= List of Asteraceae of South Africa =

List of flowering plants in the family Asteraceae recorded from South Africa

Asteraceae or Compositae is a family of flowering plants (anthophytes) in the order Asterales. Asteraceae (commonly referred to as the aster, daisy, composite, or sunflower family), is a very large and widespread family, which includes over 32,000 currently accepted species, in over 1,900 genera (list) in 13 subfamilies. In terms of numbers of species, the Asteraceae are rivaled only by the Orchidaceae. Nearly all Asteraceae bear their flowers in dense heads (capitula or pseudanthia) surrounded by involucral bracts. When viewed from a distance, each capitulum may appear to be a single flower. Enlarged outer (peripheral) flowers in the capitula may resemble petals, and the involucral bracts may look like a calyx. The name Asteraceae comes from the type genus Aster, from the Ancient Greek ἀστήρ, meaning star, and refers to the star-like form of the inflorescence. The alternative name Compositae is still valid under the International Code of Nomenclature for algae, fungi, and plants. It refers to the "composite" nature of the capitula, which consist of a few or many individual flowers.

Most members of Asteraceae are annual or perennial herbs, but a significant number are also shrubs, vines, or trees. The family has a cosmopolitan distribution, with species ranging from subpolar to tropical regions, colonizing a wide variety of habitats. The largest proportion of the species occur in the arid and semiarid regions of subtropical and lower temperate latitudes.

23,420 species of vascular plant have been recorded in South Africa, making it the sixth most species-rich country in the world and the most species-rich country on the African continent. Of these, 153 species are considered to be threatened. Nine biomes have been described in South Africa: Fynbos, Succulent Karoo, desert, Nama Karoo, grassland, savanna, Albany thickets, the Indian Ocean coastal belt, and forests.

The 2018 South African National Biodiversity Institute's National Biodiversity Assessment plant checklist lists 35,130 taxa in the phyla Anthocerotophyta (hornworts (6)), Anthophyta (flowering plants (33534)), Bryophyta (mosses (685)), Cycadophyta (cycads (42)), Lycopodiophyta (Lycophytes(45)), Marchantiophyta (liverworts (376)), Pinophyta (conifers (33)), and Pteridophyta (cryptogams (408)).

329 genera are represented in the literature. Listed taxa include species, subspecies, varieties, and forms as recorded, some of which have subsequently been allocated to other taxa as synonyms, in which cases the accepted taxon is appended to the listing. Multiple entries under alternative names reflect taxonomic revision over time.

== Acanthospermum ==
Genus Acanthospermum:

- Acanthospermum australe (Loefl.) Kuntze, not indigenous
- Acanthospermum glabratum (DC.) Wild, not indigenous
- Acanthospermum hispidum DC. not indigenous

== Acanthotheca ==
Genus Acanthotheca:

- Acanthotheca pinnatisecta DC. accepted as Dimorphotheca pinnata (Thunb.) Harv.

== Achillea ==
Genus Achillea:

- Achillea millefolium L. not indigenous

== Achyrocline ==
Genus Achyrocline:

- Achyrocline stenoptera (DC.) Hilliard & B.L.Burtt, accepted as Helichrysum stenopterum DC. indigenous

== Acmella ==
Genus Acmella:

- Acmella caulirhiza Delile, not indigenous, invasive
- Acmella decumbens (Sm.) R.K.Jansen, not indigenous, invasive

== Adenachaena ==
Genus Adenachaena:

- Adenachaena leptophylla DC. accepted as Phymaspermum leptophyllum (DC.) Benth. & Hook. ex B.D.Jacks. indigenous
- Adenachaena parvifolia DC. accepted as Phymaspermum parvifolium (DC.) Benth. & Hook. ex B.D.Jacks. endemic
- Adenachaena pubescens DC. accepted as Phymaspermum parvifolium (DC.) Benth. & Hook. ex B.D.Jacks. indigenous

== Adenanthellum ==
Genus Adenanthellum:

- Adenanthellum osmitoides (Harv.) B.Nord. indigenous

== Adenoglossa ==
Genus Adenoglossa:

- Adenoglossa decurrens (Hutch.) B.Nord. endemic

== Adenostemma ==
Genus Adenostemma:

- Adenostemma caffrum DC. indigenous
- Adenostemma viscosum J.R.Forst. & G.Forst. indigenous

== Afroaster ==
Genus Afroaster:

- Afroaster bowiei (Harv.) J.C.Manning & Goldblatt, endemic
- Afroaster comptonii (Lippert) J.C.Manning & Goldblatt, indigenous
- Afroaster confertifolius (Hilliard & B.L.Burtt) J.C.Manning & Goldblatt, endemic
- Afroaster erucifolius (Thell.) J.C.Manning & Goldblatt, indigenous
- Afroaster laevigatus (Sond.) J.C.Manning & Goldblatt, endemic
- Afroaster lydenburgensis (Lippert) J.C.Manning & Goldblatt, indigenous
- Afroaster nubimontis (Lippert) J.C.Manning & Goldblatt, endemic
- Afroaster peglerae (Bolus) J.C.Manning & Goldblatt, endemic
- Afroaster perfoliatus (Oliv.) J.C.Manning & Goldblatt, indigenous
- Afroaster pleiocephalus (Harv.) J.C.Manning & Goldblatt, endemic
- Afroaster serrulatus (Harv.) J.C.Manning & Goldblatt, indigenous
- Afroaster zuluensis (Lippert) J.C.Manning & Goldblatt, endemic

== Ageratina ==
Genus Ageratina:

- Ageratina adenophora (Spreng.) R.M.King & H.Rob. not indigenous, invasive
- Ageratina altissima (L.) R.M.King & H.Rob. not indigenous
- Ageratina riparia (Regel) R.M.King & H.Rob. not indigenous, invasive

== Ageratum ==
Genus Ageratum:

- Ageratum conyzoides L. not indigenous, invasive
- Ageratum houstonianum Mill. not indigenous, invasive

== Alatoseta ==
Genus Alatoseta:

- Alatoseta tenuis Compton, endemic

== Alciope ==
Genus Alciope:

- Alciope lanata (Thunb.) DC. accepted as Capelio tomentosa (Burm.f.) B.Nord.
- Alciope tabularis (Thunb.) DC. accepted as Capelio tabularis (Thunb.) B.Nord.

== Ambrosia ==
Genus Ambrosia:

- Ambrosia artemisiifolia L. not indigenous
- Ambrosia psilostachya DC. not indigenous
- Ambrosia tenuifolia Spreng. not indigenous

== Amellus ==
Genus Amellus:

- Amellus alternifolius Roth, indigenous
  - Amellus alternifolius Roth subsp. alternifolius, endemic
  - Amellus alternifolius Roth subsp. angustissimus (DC.) Rommel, endemic
- Amellus asteroides (L.) Druce, indigenous
  - Amellus asteroides (L.) Druce subsp. asteroides, endemic
  - Amellus asteroides (L.) Druce subsp. mollis Rommel, endemic
- Amellus capensis (Walp.) Hutch. endemic
- Amellus coilopodius DC. endemic
- Amellus epaleaceus O.Hoffm. indigenous
- Amellus flosculosus DC. indigenous
- Amellus microglossus DC. endemic
- Amellus nanus DC. indigenous
- Amellus strigosus (Thunb.) Less. indigenous
  - Amellus strigosus (Thunb.) Less. subsp. pseudoscabridus Rommel, endemic
  - Amellus strigosus (Thunb.) Less. subsp. scabridus (DC.) Rommel, endemic
  - Amellus strigosus (Thunb.) Less. subsp. strigosus, endemic
- Amellus tenuifolius Burm. endemic
- Amellus tridactylus DC. indigenous
  - Amellus tridactylus DC. subsp. arenarius (S.Moore) Rommel, indigenous
  - Amellus tridactylus DC. subsp. olivaceus Rommel, endemic
  - Amellus tridactylus DC. subsp. tridactylus, endemic

== Amphiglossa ==
Genus Amphiglossa:

- Amphiglossa callunoides DC. endemic
- Amphiglossa celans Koekemoer, endemic
- Amphiglossa corrudifolia DC. endemic
- Amphiglossa foliosa J.C.Manning & Helme, endemic
- Amphiglossa grisea Koekemoer, endemic
- Amphiglossa kolbei Bolus, accepted as Disparago kolbei (Bolus) Hutch. indigenous
- Amphiglossa nitidula DC. accepted as Amphiglossa tomentosa (Thunb.) Harv.
- Amphiglossa perotrichoides DC. endemic
- Amphiglossa rudolphii Koekemoer, endemic
- Amphiglossa susannae Koekemoer, endemic
- Amphiglossa tecta (Brusse) Koekemoer, endemic
- Amphiglossa tomentosa (Thunb.) Harv. indigenous
- Amphiglossa triflora DC. indigenous

== Anaglypha ==
Genus Anaglypha:

- Anaglypha acicularis Benth. accepted as Osteospermum scabrum Thunb. indigenous

== Anaxeton ==
Genus Anaxeton:

- Anaxeton angustifolium Lundgren, endemic
- Anaxeton arborescens (L.) Less. endemic
- Anaxeton asperum (Thunb.) DC. indigenous
  - Anaxeton asperum (Thunb.) DC. subsp. asperum, endemic
  - Anaxeton asperum (Thunb.) DC. subsp. pauciflorum Lundgren, endemic
- Anaxeton brevipes Lundgren, endemic
- Anaxeton ellipticum Lundgren, endemic
- Anaxeton hirsutum (Thunb.) Less. endemic
- Anaxeton laeve (Harv.) Lundgren, endemic
- Anaxeton lundgrenii B.Nord. endemic
- Anaxeton nycthemerum Less. endemic
- Anaxeton virgatum DC. endemic

== Anderbergia ==
Genus Anderbergia:

- Anderbergia elsiae B.Nord. endemic
- Anderbergia epaleata (Hilliard & B.L.Burtt) B.Nord. endemic
- Anderbergia fallax B.Nord. endemic
- Anderbergia rooibergensis B.Nord. endemic
- Anderbergia ustulata B.Nord. endemic
- Anderbergia vlokii (Hilliard) B.Nord. endemic

== Anisochaeta ==
Genus Anisochaeta:

- Anisochaeta mikanioides DC. endemic

== Anisopappus ==
Genus Anisopappus:

- Anisopappus junodii Hutch. endemic
- Anisopappus latifolius (S.Moore) B.L.Burtt, endemic
- Anisopappus smutsii Hutch. indigenous

== Anisothrix ==
Genus Anisothrix:

- Anisothrix integra (Compton) Anderb. accepted as Pentatrichia integra (Compton) Klaassen & N.G.Bergh, endemic
- Anisothrix kuntzei O.Hoffm. accepted as Pentatrichia kuntzei (O.Hoffm.) Klaassen & N.G.Bergh, endemic

== Anthemis ==
Genus Anthemis:

- Anthemis arvensis L. not indigenous
- Anthemis cotula L. not indigenous

== Antithrixia ==
Genus Antithrixia:

- Antithrixia flavicoma DC. endemic

== Aphelexis ==
Genus Aphelexis:

- Aphelexis ericoides (Lam.) Sweet, accepted as Dolichothrix ericoides (Lam.) Hilliard & B.L.Burtt, indigenous

== Arctotheca ==
Genus Arctotheca:

- Arctotheca calendula (L.) Levyns, indigenous
- Arctotheca forbesiana (DC.) K.Lewin, endemic
- Arctotheca marginata Beyers, endemic
- Arctotheca populifolia (P.J.Bergius) Norl. indigenous
- Arctotheca prostrata (Salisb.) Britten, endemic

== Arctotis ==
Genus Arctotis:

- Arctotis acaulis L. endemic
- Arctotis acuminata K.Lewin, endemic
- Arctotis adpressa DC. endemic
- Arctotis aenea Jacq. endemic
- Arctotis angustifolia L. endemic
- Arctotis arctotoides (L.f.) O.Hoffm. indigenous
- Arctotis argentea Thunb. endemic
- Arctotis aspera L. indigenous
  - Arctotis aspera L. var. aspera, endemic
  - Arctotis aspera L. var. scabra P.J.Bergius, endemic
- Arctotis auriculata Jacq. indigenous
- Arctotis bellidiastrum (S.Moore) K.Lewin, endemic
- Arctotis bellidifolia P.J.Bergius, endemic
- Arctotis bolusii (S.Moore) K.Lewin, endemic
- Arctotis campanulata DC. indigenous
  - Arctotis campanulata DC. var. campanulata, endemic
- Arctotis candida Thunb. endemic
- Arctotis caudata K.Lewin, endemic
- Arctotis crispata Hutch. accepted as Arctotis revoluta Jacq. endemic
- Arctotis cuneata DC. endemic
- Arctotis cuprea Jacq. accepted as Arctotis revoluta Jacq. endemic
- Arctotis debensis R.J.Mckenzie, endemic
- Arctotis decurrens Jacq. endemic
- Arctotis diffusa Thunb. endemic
- Arctotis discolor (Less.) Beauverd, endemic
- Arctotis dregei Turcz. endemic
- Arctotis elongata Thunb. endemic
- Arctotis erosa (Harv.) Beauverd, accepted as Arctotis subacaulis (DC.) Beauverd, endemic
- Arctotis fastuosa Jacq. indigenous
- Arctotis flaccida Jacq. endemic
- Arctotis fosteri N.E.Br. accepted as Arctotis acaulis L. endemic
- Arctotis gowerae E.Phillips, accepted as Arctotis flaccida Jacq. endemic
- Arctotis graminea K.Lewin, endemic
- Arctotis gumbletonii Hook.f. endemic
- Arctotis hirsuta (Harv.) Beauverd, endemic
- Arctotis hispidula (Less.) Beauverd, endemic
- Arctotis incisa Thunb. endemic
- Arctotis laevis Thunb. accepted as Arctotis revoluta Jacq. endemic
- Arctotis lanceolata Harv. endemic
- Arctotis leiocarpa Harv. indigenous
- Arctotis leptorhiza DC. accepted as Arctotis breviscapa Thunb. endemic
- Arctotis linearis Thunb. endemic
- Arctotis macrosperma (DC.) Beauverd, accepted as Arctotis semipapposa (DC.) Beauverd, endemic
- Arctotis merxmuelleri Friedrich, accepted as Arctotis decurrens Jacq. endemic
- Arctotis microcephala (DC.) Beauverd, indigenous
- Arctotis oocephala DC. accepted as Haplocarpha oocephala (DC.) Beyers
- Arctotis perfoliata (Less.) Beauverd, endemic
- Arctotis petiolata Thunb. endemic
- Arctotis pinnatifida Thunb. endemic
- Arctotis pusilla DC. accepted as Arctotis flaccida Jacq. endemic
- Arctotis revoluta Jacq. endemic
- Arctotis rotundifolia K.Lewin, endemic
- Arctotis schlechteri K.Lewin, endemic
- Arctotis scullyi Dummer, accepted as Arctotis decurrens Jacq. endemic
- Arctotis semipapposa (DC.) Beauverd, endemic
- Arctotis sessilifolia K.Lewin, endemic
- Arctotis setosa K.Lewin, endemic
- Arctotis stephensae Hutch. accepted as Arctotis bellidifolia P.J.Bergius
- Arctotis stoechadifolia P.J.Bergius, endemic
- Arctotis subacaulis (DC.) Beauverd, indigenous
- Arctotis suffruticosa K.Lewin, endemic
- Arctotis sulcocarpa K.Lewin, endemic
- Arctotis tricolor Jacq. endemic
- Arctotis undulata Jacq. endemic
- Arctotis venidioides DC. accepted as Arctotis flaccida Jacq. endemic
- Arctotis venusta Norl. indigenous
- Arctotis virgata Jacq. endemic

== Argyrocome ==
Genus Argyrocome:

- Argyrocome ericoides (Lam.) Lam. accepted as Dolichothrix ericoides (Lam.) Hilliard & B.L.Burtt, indigenous

== Arnica ==
Genus Arnica:

- Arnica caffra L. accepted as Gerbera crocea (L.) Kuntze, indigenous
- Arnica coronopifolia L. accepted as Gerbera linnaei Cass. indigenous
- Arnica crenata Thunb. accepted as Mairia crenata (Thunb.) Nees, indigenous
- Arnica crocea L. accepted as Gerbera crocea (L.) Kuntze, endemic
- Arnica gerbera L. accepted as Gerbera linnaei Cass. indigenous
- Arnica pyrolaefolia (Lam.) Pers. accepted as Gerbera crocea (L.) Kuntze, indigenous
  - Arnica pyrolaefolia (Lam.) Pers. var. crocea (L.) Pers. accepted as Gerbera crocea (L.) Kuntze, endemic
- Arnica serrata Thunb. accepted as Gerbera serrata (Thunb.) Druce, endemic
- Arnica sinuata Thunb. accepted as Gerbera sinuata (Thunb.) Spreng., endemic

== Arrowsmithia ==
Genus Arrowsmithia:

- Arrowsmithia styphelioides DC. endemic

== Artemisia ==
Genus Artemisia:

- Artemisia afra Jacq. ex Willd. indigenous
  - Artemisia afra Jacq. ex Willd. var. afra, indigenous
- Artemisia maderaspatana L. accepted as Grangea maderaspatana (L.) Poir. indigenous
- Artemisia vulgaris L. not indigenous

== Artemisiopsis ==
Genus Artemisiopsis:

- Artemisiopsis villosa (O.Hoffm.) Schweick. indigenous

== Ascaricida ==
Genus Ascaricida:

- Ascaricida adoensis (Sch.Bip. ex Walp.) Steetz, accepted as Baccharoides adoensis (Sch.Bip. ex Walp.) H.Rob. indigenous
- Ascaricida mossambiquensis Steetz, accepted as Baccharoides adoensis (Sch.Bip. ex Walp.) H.Rob. indigenous
- Ascaricida richardi Steetz, accepted as Baccharoides adoensis (Sch.Bip. ex Walp.) H.Rob.

== Aspilia ==
Genus Aspilia:

- Aspilia mossambicensis (Oliv.) Wild, indigenous
- Aspilia natalensis (Sond.) Wild, indigenous
- Aspilia pluriseta Schweinf. indigenous
  - Aspilia pluriseta Schweinf. subsp. pluriseta, indigenous

== Aster ==
Genus Aster:

- Aster ananthocladus Hilliard & B.L.Burtt, endemic
- Aster bakerianus Burtt Davy ex C.A.Sm. accepted as Afroaster hispidus (Thunb.) J.C.Manning & Goldblatt, indigenous
- Aster bowiei Harv. accepted as Afroaster bowiei (Harv.) J.C.Manning & Goldblatt, endemic
- Aster comptonii W.Lippert, accepted as Afroaster comptonii (Lippert) J.C.Manning & Goldblatt, indigenous
- Aster confertifolius Hilliard & B.L.Burtt, accepted as Afroaster confertifolius (Hilliard & B.L.Burtt) J.C.Manning & Goldblatt, endemic
- Aster erucifolius (Thell.) W.Lippert, accepted as Afroaster erucifolius (Thell.) J.C.Manning & Goldblatt, indigenous
- Aster harveyanus Kuntze, accepted as Afroaster serrulatus (Harv.) J.C.Manning & Goldblatt, indigenous
- Aster laevigatus (Sond.) Kuntze, accepted as Afroaster laevigatus (Sond.) J.C.Manning & Goldblatt, endemic
- Aster lydenburgensis W.Lippert, accepted as Afroaster lydenburgensis (Lippert) J.C.Manning & Goldblatt, endemic
- Aster nubimontis W.Lippert, accepted as Afroaster nubimontis (Lippert) J.C.Manning & Goldblatt, endemic
- Aster peglerae Bolus, accepted as Afroaster peglerae (Bolus) J.C.Manning & Goldblatt, endemic
- Aster perfoliatus Oliv. accepted as Afroaster perfoliatus (Oliv.) J.C.Manning & Goldblatt, indigenous
- Aster pleiocephalus (Harv.) Hutch. accepted as Afroaster pleiocephalus (Harv.) J.C.Manning & Goldblatt, endemic
- Aster pseudobakeranus W.Lippert, accepted as Afroaster pseudobakerianus (Lippert) J.C.Manning & Goldblatt
- Aster squamatus (Spreng.) Hieron. accepted as Symphyotrichum squamatum (Spreng.) G.L.Nesom, not indigenous
- Aster zuluensis W.Lippert, accepted as Afroaster zuluensis (Lippert) J.C.Manning & Goldblatt, endemic

== Athanasia ==
Genus Athanasia:

- Athanasia acerosa (DC.) D.Dietr. accepted as Phymaspermum acerosum (DC.) Kallersjo, indigenous
- Athanasia adenantha (Harv.) Kallersjo, endemic
- Athanasia alba Kallersjo, endemic
- Athanasia argentea R.Powell & Magee, endemic
- Athanasia bremeri Kallersjo, endemic
- Athanasia calophylla Kallersjo, endemic
- Athanasia capitata (L.) L. endemic
- Athanasia cochlearifolia Kallersjo, endemic
- Athanasia crenata (L.) L. endemic
- Athanasia crithmifolia (L.) L. indigenous
  - Athanasia crithmifolia (L.) L. subsp. crithmifolia, endemic
  - Athanasia crithmifolia (L.) L. subsp. palmatifida (DC.) Kallersjo, endemic
- Athanasia cuneifolia Lam. endemic
- Athanasia dentata (L.) L., endemic
- Athanasia elsiae Kallersjo, endemic
- Athanasia filiformis L.f. endemic
- Athanasia flexuosa Thunb. [1], endemic
- Athanasia grandiceps Hilliard & B.L.Burtt, endemic
- Athanasia hirsuta Thunb. endemic
- Athanasia humilis Kallersjo, endemic
- Athanasia imbricata Harv. endemic
- Athanasia inopinata (Hutch.) Kallersjo, endemic
- Athanasia juncea (DC.) D.Dietr. endemic
- Athanasia leptocephala Kallersjo, endemic
- Athanasia linifolia Burm., endemic
- Athanasia microcephala (DC.) D.Dietr. endemic
- Athanasia microphylla DC. endemic
- Athanasia minuta (L.f.) Kallersjo, indigenous
  - Athanasia minuta (L.f.) Kallersjo subsp. inermis (E.Phillips) Kallersjo, endemic
  - Athanasia minuta (L.f.) Kallersjo subsp. minuta, indigenous
- Athanasia natalensis Schltr. accepted as Phymaspermum acerosum (DC.) Kallersjo, indigenous
- Athanasia oocephala (DC.) Kallersjo, endemic
- Athanasia pachycephala DC. indigenous
  - Athanasia pachycephala DC. subsp. eriopoda (DC.) Kallersjo, endemic
  - Athanasia pachycephala DC. subsp. pachycephala, endemic
- Athanasia parviflora L. accepted as Hymenolepis crithmifolia (L.) Greuter, M.V.Agab. & Wagenitz, indigenous
- Athanasia pectinata L.f. endemic
- Athanasia pinnata L.f. endemic
- Athanasia pinnatifida (Oliv.) Hilliard, accepted as Phymaspermum pinnatifidum (Oliv.) Kallersjo, indigenous
- Athanasia pubescens (L.) L. endemic
- Athanasia quinquedentata Thunb. indigenous
  - Athanasia quinquedentata Thunb. subsp. quinquedentata, endemic
  - Athanasia quinquedentata Thunb. subsp. rigens Kallersjo, endemic
- Athanasia rugulosa E.Mey. ex DC. endemic
- Athanasia scabra Thunb. endemic
- Athanasia sertulifera DC. endemic
- Athanasia spathulata (DC.) D.Dietr. endemic
- Athanasia tomentosa Thunb. endemic
- Athanasia trifurcata (L.) L. endemic
- Athanasia vestita (Thunb.) Druce, endemic
- Athanasia villosa Hilliard, accepted as Phymaspermum acerosum (DC.) Kallersjo, indigenous
- Athanasia virgata Jacq. endemic
- Athanasia viridis Kallersjo, endemic
- Athanasia woodii (Thell.) Hilliard, accepted as Phymaspermum woodii (Thell.) Kallersjo, indigenous

== Athrixia ==
Genus Athrixia:

- Athrixia angustissima DC. indigenous
- Athrixia arachnoidea J.M.Wood & M.S.Evans ex J.M.Wood, endemic
- Athrixia capensis Ker Gawl. endemic
- Athrixia crinita (L.) Druce, endemic
- Athrixia elata Sond. indigenous
- Athrixia fontana MacOwan, indigenous
- Athrixia gerrardii Harv. endemic
- Athrixia heterophylla (Thunb.) Less. indigenous
  - Athrixia heterophylla (Thunb.) Less. subsp. heterophylla, endemic
  - Athrixia heterophylla (Thunb.) Less. subsp. sessilifolia (DC.) Kroner, endemic
- Athrixia phylicoides DC. indigenous

== Atractylis ==
Genus Atractylis:

- Atractylis ciliaris L. accepted as Cullumia reticulata (L.) Greuter, M.V.Agab. & Wagenitz, indigenous

== Atrichantha ==
Genus Atrichantha:

- Atrichantha gemmifera (Bolus) Hilliard & B.L.Burtt, endemic

== Baccharis ==
Genus Baccharis:

- Baccharis aegyptiaca (L.) Desf. accepted as Conyza aegyptiaca (L.) Aiton, indigenous
- Baccharis ilicifolia Lam. accepted as Brachylaena ilicifolia (Lam.) E.Phillips & Schweick. indigenous
- Baccharis ovalis Pers. accepted as Pluchea ovalis (Pers.) DC.
- Baccharis pingraea DC. not indigenous
- Baccharis ulmifolia Burm.f. accepted as Conyza ulmifolia (Burm.f.) Kuntze, indigenous

== Baccharoides ==
Genus Baccharoides:

- Baccharoides adoensis (Sch.Bip. ex Walp.) H.Rob. indigenous
- Baccharoides adoensis (Sch.Bip. ex Walp.) H.Rob. var. kotschyana (Sch.Bip. ex Walp.) Isawumi, El-Gha, accepted as Baccharoides adoensis (Sch.Bip. ex Walp.) H.Rob. indigenous
- Baccharoides adoensis (Sch.Bip. ex Walp.) H.Rob. var. mossambiquensis (Steetz) Isawumi, El-Ghazaly &, accepted as Baccharoides adoensis (Sch.Bip. ex Walp.) H.Rob. indigenous

== Berkheya ==
Genus Berkheya:

- Berkheya acanthopoda (DC.) Roessler, endemic
- Berkheya angusta Schltr. endemic
- Berkheya angustifolia (Houtt.) Merr. indigenous
- Berkheya annectens Harv. indigenous
- Berkheya armata (Vahl) Druce, endemic
- Berkheya barbata (L.f.) Hutch. endemic
- Berkheya bergiana Soderb. endemic
- Berkheya bipinnatifida (Harv.) Roessler, indigenous
  - Berkheya bipinnatifida (Harv.) Roessler subsp. bipinnatifida, endemic
  - Berkheya bipinnatifida (Harv.) Roessler subsp. echinopsoides (Baker) Roessler, indigenous
- Berkheya buphthalmoides (DC.) Schltr. indigenous
- Berkheya caffra MacOwan, endemic
- Berkheya canescens DC. indigenous
- Berkheya cardopatifolia (DC.) Roessler, endemic
- Berkheya carduoides (Less.) Hutch. endemic
- Berkheya carlinifolia (DC.) Roessler, indigenous
  - Berkheya carlinifolia (DC.) Roessler subsp. carlinifolia, endemic
  - Berkheya carlinifolia (DC.) Roessler subsp. promontorii Roessler, endemic
- Berkheya carlinoides (Vahl) Willd. endemic
- Berkheya carlinopsis Welw. ex O.Hoffm. indigenous
  - Berkheya carlinopsis Welw. ex O.Hoffm. subsp. magalismontana (Bolus) Roessler, endemic
- Berkheya chamaepeuce (S.Moore) Roessler, indigenous
- Berkheya chrysanthemoides J.C.Manning & Goldblatt, indigenous
- Berkheya ciliaris (L.) Willd. accepted as Cullumia reticulata (L.) Greuter, M.V.Agab. & Wagenitz, indigenous
- Berkheya cirsiifolia (DC.) Roessler, indigenous
- Berkheya coddii Roessler, indigenous
- Berkheya coriacea Harv. endemic
- Berkheya cruciata (Houtt.) Willd. indigenous
  - Berkheya cruciata (Houtt.) Willd. subsp. cruciata, endemic
  - Berkheya cruciata (Houtt.) Willd. subsp. subintegra Roessler, endemic
- Berkheya cuneata (Thunb.) Willd. endemic
- Berkheya debilis MacOwan, endemic
- Berkheya decurrens (Thunb.) Willd. endemic
- Berkheya densifolia Bohnen ex Roessler, endemic
- Berkheya discolor (DC.) O.Hoffm. & Muschl. indigenous
- Berkheya draco Roessler, endemic
- Berkheya dregei Harv. endemic
- Berkheya dumicola N.G.Bergh & Helme, indigenous
- Berkheya echinacea (Harv.) O.Hoffm. ex Burtt Davy, indigenous
- Berkheya echinacea (Harv.) O.Hoffm. ex Burtt Davy subsp. echinacea, indigenous
- Berkheya eriobasis (DC.) Roessler, endemic
- Berkheya erysithales (DC.) Roessler, indigenous
- Berkheya ferox O.Hoffm. indigenous
  - Berkheya ferox O.Hoffm. var. pseudodidelta Roessler, indigenous
  - Berkheya ferox O.Hoffm. var. tomentosa Roessler, indigenous
- Berkheya francisci Bolus, endemic
- Berkheya fruticosa (L.) Ehrh. endemic
- Berkheya glabrata (Thunb.) Fourc. endemic
- Berkheya griquana Hilliard & B.L.Burtt, endemic
- Berkheya herbacea (L.f.) Druce, endemic
- Berkheya heterophylla (Thunb.) O.Hoffm. indigenous
  - Berkheya heterophylla (Thunb.) O.Hoffm. var. heterophylla, endemic
  - Berkheya heterophylla (Thunb.) O.Hoffm. var. radiata (DC.) Roessler, endemic
- Berkheya insignis (Harv.) Thell. indigenous
- Berkheya jardineana J.C.Manning & Goldblatt, indigenous
- Berkheya latifolia J.M.Wood & M.S.Evans, indigenous
- Berkheya leucaugeta Hilliard, endemic
- Berkheya mackenii (Harv.) Roessler, endemic
- Berkheya macrocephala J.M.Wood, indigenous
- Berkheya maritima J.M.Wood & M.S.Evans, endemic
- Berkheya montana J.M.Wood & M.S.Evans, indigenous
- Berkheya multijuga (DC.) Roessler, indigenous
- Berkheya nivea N.E.Br. endemic
- Berkheya onobromoides (DC.) O.Hoffm. & Muschl. indigenous
  - Berkheya onobromoides (DC.) O.Hoffm. & Muschl. var. carlinoides (Thunb.) Roessler, endemic
  - Berkheya onobromoides (DC.) O.Hoffm. & Muschl. var. onobromoides, endemic
- Berkheya onopordifolia (DC.) O.Hoffm. ex Burtt Davy, indigenous
  - Berkheya onopordifolia (DC.) O.Hoffm. ex Burtt Davy var. glabra Bohnen ex Roessler, indigenous
  - Berkheya onopordifolia (DC.) O.Hoffm. ex Burtt Davy var. onopordifolia, indigenous
- Berkheya pannosa Hilliard, endemic
- Berkheya pauciflora Roessler, endemic
- Berkheya pinnatifida (Thunb.) Thell. indigenous
  - Berkheya pinnatifida (Thunb.) Thell. subsp. ingrata (Bolus) Roessler, endemic
  - Berkheya pinnatifida (Thunb.) Thell. subsp. pinnatifida, endemic
  - Berkheya pinnatifida (Thunb.) Thell. subsp. stobaeoides (Harv.) Roessler, indigenous
- Berkheya purpurea (DC.) Mast. indigenous
- Berkheya radula (Harv.) De Wild. indigenous
- Berkheya radyeri Roessler, endemic
- Berkheya rhapontica (DC.) Hutch. & Burtt Davy, indigenous
  - Berkheya rhapontica (DC.) Hutch. & Burtt Davy subsp. aristosa (DC.) Roessler var. aristosa, indigenous
  - Berkheya rhapontica (DC.) Hutch. & Burtt Davy subsp. aristosa (DC.) Roessler var. exalata, indigenous
  - Berkheya rhapontica (DC.) Hutch. & Burtt Davy subsp. platyptera (Harv.) Roessler, indigenous
  - Berkheya rhapontica (DC.) Hutch. & Burtt Davy subsp. rhapontica, indigenous
- Berkheya rigida (Thunb.) Ewart, Jean White & B.Rees, endemic
- Berkheya robusta Bohnen ex Roessler, indigenous
- Berkheya rosulata Roessler, indigenous
- Berkheya seminivea Harv. & Sond. endemic
- Berkheya setifera DC. indigenous
- Berkheya speciosa (DC.) O.Hoffm. indigenous
  - Berkheya speciosa (DC.) O.Hoffm. subsp. lanceolata Roessler, indigenous
  - Berkheya speciosa (DC.) O.Hoffm. subsp. ovata Roessler, endemic
  - Berkheya speciosa (DC.) O.Hoffm. subsp. speciosa, indigenous
- Berkheya sphaerocephala (DC.) Roessler, endemic
- Berkheya spinosa (L.f.) Druce, endemic
- Berkheya spinosissima (Thunb.) Willd. indigenous
  - Berkheya spinosissima (Thunb.) Willd. subsp. namaensis Roessler var. argentifolia, indigenous
  - Berkheya spinosissima (Thunb.) Willd. subsp. namaensis Roessler var. namaensis, indigenous
  - Berkheya spinosissima (Thunb.) Willd. subsp. spinosissima, indigenous
- Berkheya subulata Harv. indigenous
  - Berkheya subulata Harv. var. subulata, endemic
  - Berkheya subulata Harv. var. wilmsiana Roessler, endemic
- Berkheya tysonii Hutch. endemic
- Berkheya umbellata DC. endemic
- Berkheya viscosa (DC.) Hutch. endemic
- Berkheya zeyheri Oliv. & Hiern, indigenous
  - Berkheya zeyheri Oliv. & Hiern subsp. rehmannii (Thell.) Roessler var. rehmannii, indigenous
  - Berkheya zeyheri Oliv. & Hiern subsp. rehmannii (Thell.) Roessler var. rogersiana, indigenous
  - Berkheya zeyheri Oliv. & Hiern subsp. zeyheri, indigenous

== Bertilia ==
Genus Bertilia:

- Bertilia hantamensis (J.C.Manning & Goldblatt) Cron, endemic

== Bidens ==
Genus Bidens:

- Bidens bipinnata L. not indigenous
- Bidens biternata (Lour.) Merr. & Sherff, not indigenous
- Bidens formosa (Bonato) Sch.Bip. accepted as Cosmos bipinnatus Cav.
- Bidens kirkii (Oliv. & Hiern) Sherff, indigenous
- Bidens pilosa L. not indigenous
- Bidens schimperi Sch.Bip. ex Walp. indigenous
- Bidens sulphurea (Cav.) Sch.Bip. accepted as Cosmos sulphureus Cav.

== Blainvillea ==
Genus Blainvillea:

- Blainvillea gayana Cass. accepted as Blainvillea acmella (L.) Philipson, indigenous

== Blumea ==
Genus Blumea:

- Blumea cafra (DC.) O.Hoffm. accepted as Doellia cafra (DC.) Anderb.
- Blumea dregeanoides Sch.Bip. ex A.Rich. indigenous
- Blumea mollis (D.Don) Merr. accepted as Blumea dregeanoides Sch.Bip. ex A.Rich.

== Bolandia ==
Genus Bolandia:

- Bolandia argillacea (Cron) Cron, indigenous
- Bolandia elongata (L.f.) J.C.Manning & Cron, indigenous
- Bolandia glabrifolia (DC.) J.C.Manning & Cron, indigenous
- Bolandia pedunculosa (DC.) Cron, indigenous
- Bolandia pinnatifida (Thunb.) J.C.Manning & Cron, indigenous

== Bothriocline ==
Genus Bothriocline:

- Bothriocline laxa N.E.Br. indigenous

== Brachylaena ==
Genus Brachylaena:

- Brachylaena discolor DC. indigenous
- Brachylaena elliptica (Thunb.) DC. endemic
- Brachylaena glabra (L.f.) Druce, endemic
- Brachylaena huillensis O.Hoffm. indigenous
- Brachylaena ilicifolia (Lam.) E.Phillips & Schweick. indigenous
- Brachylaena neriifolia (L.) R.Br. endemic
- Brachylaena rotundata S.Moore, indigenous
- Brachylaena transvaalensis E.Phillips & Schweick. indigenous
- Brachylaena uniflora Harv. endemic

== Brachymeris ==
Genus Brachymeris:

- Brachymeris athanasioides (S.Moore) Hutch. accepted as Phymaspermum athanasioides (S.Moore) Kallersjo, indigenous
- Brachymeris bolusii Hutch. accepted as Phymaspermum athanasioides (S.Moore) Kallersjo, indigenous
- Brachymeris erubescens Hutch. accepted as Phymaspermum erubescens (Hutch.) Kallersjo, indigenous
- Brachymeris montana Hutch. accepted as Phymaspermum athanasioides (S.Moore) Kallersjo, indigenous
- Brachymeris peglerae Hutch. accepted as Phymaspermum peglerae (Hutch.) Kallersjo, indigenous
- Brachymeris scoparia DC. accepted as Phymaspermum scoparium (DC.) Kallersjo, indigenous

== Brachyrhynchos ==
Genus Brachyrhynchos:

- Brachyrhynchos albicaulis DC. accepted as Bolandia pinnatifida (Thunb.) J.C.Manning & Cron, indigenous
  - Brachyrhynchos diversifolius DC. var. acutilobus DC. accepted as Bolandia pinnatifida (Thunb.) J.C.Manning & Cron, indigenous
  - Brachyrhynchos diversifolius DC. var. cuneatus E.Mey. ex DC. accepted as Bolandia pinnatifida (Thunb.) J.C.Manning & Cron, indigenous
  - Brachyrhynchos diversifolius DC. var. obtusilobus DC. accepted as Bolandia glabrifolia (DC.) J.C.Manning & Cron, indigenous
- Brachyrhynchos elongatus (L.f.) Less. accepted as Bolandia elongata (L.f.) J.C.Manning & Cron, indigenous
- Brachyrhynchos trachycarpus DC. accepted as Bolandia pinnatifida (Thunb.) J.C.Manning & Cron, indigenous
- Brachyrhynchos tuberosus DC. accepted as Senecio incertus DC. indigenous

== Bryomorphe ==
Genus Bryomorphe:

- Bryomorphe aretioides (Turcz.) Druce, endemic
- Bryomorphe lycopodioides (Sch.Bip. ex Walp.) Levyns, accepted as Dolichothrix ericoides (Lam.) Hilliard & B.L.Burtt, indigenous
- Bryomorphe zeyheri Harv. accepted as Bryomorphe aretioides (Turcz.) Druce, indigenous

== Cacalia ==
Genus Cacalia:

- Cacalia aristata (DC.) Kuntze, accepted as Hilliardiella aristata (DC.) H.Rob. indigenous
- Cacalia capensis (Houtt.) Kuntze, accepted as Hilliardiella capensis (Houtt.) H.Rob. Skvarla & V.A.Funk, indigenous
- Cacalia corymbosa (L.f.) Kuntze, accepted as Gymnanthemum corymbosum (L.f.) H.Rob. indigenous
- Cacalia cylindrica Lam. accepted as Crassothonna cylindrica (Lam.) B.Nord. indigenous
- Cacalia elaeagnoides (DC.) Kuntze, accepted as Hilliardiella elaeagnoides (DC.) Swelank. & J.C.Manning, indigenous
- Cacalia gerrardii (Harv.) Kuntze, accepted as Parapolydora gerrardii (Harv.) H.Rob. Skvarla & V.A.Funk, indigenous
- Cacalia mespilifolia (Less.) Kuntze, accepted as Gymnanthemum capensis (A.Spreng.) J.C.Manning & Swelank. indigenous
- Cacalia nudicaulis (DC.) Kuntze, accepted as Hilliardiella nudicaulis (DC.) H.Rob. endemic

== Cadiscus ==
Genus Cadiscus:

- Cadiscus aquaticus E.Mey. ex DC. accepted as Senecio cadiscus B.Nord. & Pelser, endemic

== Calendula ==
Genus Calendula:

- Calendula amplexicaulis Thunb. accepted as Osteospermum connatum DC. indigenous
- Calendula arvensis L. not indigenous
- Calendula graminifolia L. accepted as Dimorphotheca nudicaulis (L.) DC. var. graminifolia (DC.) Harv. indigenous
- Calendula monstrosa Burm.f. accepted as Osteospermum monstrosum (Burm.f.) J.C.Manning & Goldblatt, indigenous
- Calendula oppositifolia Aiton, accepted as Osteospermum oppositifolium (Aiton) Norl. indigenous
- Calendula tomentosa L.f. accepted as Osteospermum tomentosum (L.f.) Norl. endemic
- Calendula tragus Aiton, accepted as Dimorphotheca tragus (Aiton) B.Nord. endemic

== Callilepis ==
Genus Callilepis:

- Callilepis caerulea (Hutch.) Leins, indigenous
- Callilepis lancifolia Burtt Davy, endemic
- Callilepis laureola DC. indigenous
- Callilepis leptophylla Harv. indigenous
- Callilepis normae P.P.J.Herman & Koekemoer, indigenous
- Callilepis salicifolia Oliv. indigenous

== Calostephane ==
Genus Calostephane:

- Calostephane divaricata Benth. indigenous

== Calotesta ==
Genus Calotesta:

- Calotesta alba P.O.Karis, endemic

== Campuloclinium ==
Genus Campuloclinium:

- Campuloclinium macrocephalum (Less.) DC. not indigenous, invasive

== Candidea ==
Genus Candidea:

- Candidea stenostegia Stapf, accepted as Baccharoides adoensis (Sch.Bip. ex Walp.) H.Rob.

== Capelio ==
Genus Capelio:

- Capelio caledonica B.Nord. endemic
- Capelio tabularis (Thunb.) B.Nord. endemic
- Capelio tomentosa (Burm.f.) B.Nord. endemic

== Caputia ==
Genus Caputia:

- Caputia oribiensis (Van Jaarsv.) J.C.Manning, indigenous

== Carduus ==
Genus Carduus:

- Carduus macrocephalus Desf. not indigenous
- Carduus nutans L. not indigenous, invasive
- Carduus tenuiflorus Curtis, not indigenous

== Carthamus ==
Genus Carthamus:

- Carthamus lanatus L. not indigenous
- Carthamus reticulatus (L.) Vaill. accepted as Cullumia reticulata (L.) Greuter, M.V.Agab. & Wagenitz, indigenous

== Castalis ==
Genus Castalis:

- Castalis nudicaulis (L.) Norl. accepted as Dimorphotheca nudicaulis (L.) DC. indigenous
  - Castalis nudicaulis (L.) Norl. var. graminifolia (L.) Norl. accepted as Dimorphotheca nudicaulis (L.) DC. var. graminifolia (DC.) Harv. indigenous
- Castalis spectabilis (Schltr.) Norl. accepted as Dimorphotheca spectabilis Schltr.
- Castalis tragus (Aiton) Norl. accepted as Dimorphotheca tragus (Aiton) B.Nord.
  - Castalis tragus (Aiton) Norl. var. pinnatifida Norl. accepted as Dimorphotheca tragus (Aiton) B.Nord.

== Cenia ==
Genus Cenia:

- Cenia duckittiae L.Bolus, accepted as Cotula duckittiae (L.Bolus) K.Bremer & Humphries
- Cenia expansa Compton, accepted as Cotula duckittiae (L.Bolus) K.Bremer & Humphries
- Cenia microglossa DC. accepted as Cotula microglossa (DC.) O.Hoffm. & Kuntze ex Kuntze
- Cenia pectinata DC. accepted as Cotula discolor (DC.) J.C.Manning & Mucina
- Cenia sericea (L.f.) DC. accepted as Cotula sericea L.f.
- Cenia turbinata (L.) Pers. accepted as Cotula turbinata L.

== Centaurea ==
Genus Centaurea:

- Centaurea calcitrapa L. not indigenous
- Centaurea cyanus L. not indigenous
- Centaurea melitensis L. not indigenous
- Centaurea repens L. accepted as Rhaponticum repens (L.) Hildago, not indigenous
- Centaurea solstitialis L. not indigenous

== Centipeda ==
Genus Centipeda:

- Centipeda capensis Less. accepted as Dichrocephala integrifolia (L.f.) Kuntze subsp. integrifolia

== Centrapalus ==
Genus Centrapalus:

- Centrapalus africanus (Sond.) H.Rob. accepted as Vernonella africana Sond. indigenous

== Chondrilla ==
Genus Chondrilla:

- Chondrilla juncea L. not indigenous, invasive

== Chromolaena ==
Genus Chromolaena:

- Chromolaena odorata (L.) R.M.King & H.Rob. not indigenous, invasive

== Chrysanthellum ==
Genus Chrysanthellum:

- Chrysanthellum indicum DC. not indigenous

== Chrysanthemoides ==
Genus Chrysanthemoides:

- Chrysanthemoides incana (Burm.f.) Norl. accepted as Osteospermum incanum Burm.f. subsp. incanum, indigenous
- Chrysanthemoides monilifera (L.) Norl. accepted as Osteospermum moniliferum L.
- Chrysanthemoides monilifera (L.) Norl. subsp. canescens (DC.) Norl. accepted as Osteospermum moniliferum L. subsp. canescens (DC.) J.C.Manning & Goldblatt, indigenous
- Chrysanthemoides monilifera (L.) Norl. subsp. pisifera (L.) Norl. accepted as Osteospermum moniliferum L. subsp. pisiferum (L.) J.C.Manning & Goldblatt, endemic
- Chrysanthemoides monilifera (L.) Norl. subsp. rotundata (DC.) Norl. accepted as Osteospermum moniliferum L. subsp. rotundatum (DC.) J.C.Manning & Goldblatt, indigenous
- Chrysanthemoides monilifera (L.) Norl. subsp. septentrionalis Norl. accepted as Osteospermum moniliferum L. subsp. septentrionale (Norl.) J.C.Manning & Goldblatt, indigenous
- Chrysanthemoides monilifera (L.) Norl. subsp. subcanescens (DC.) Norl. accepted as Osteospermum incanum Burm.f. subsp. subcanescens (DC.) J.C.Manning & Goldblatt, endemic
- Chrysanthemoides pisiformis Medik. accepted as Osteospermum moniliferum L. subsp. pisiferum (L.) J.C.Manning & Goldblatt, endemic

== Chrysanthemum ==
Genus Chrysanthemum:

- Chrysanthemum coronarium L. accepted as Glebionis coronaria (L.) Cass. ex Spach, not indigenous
- Chrysanthemum leucanthemum L. accepted as Leucanthemum vulgare Lam. not indigenous
- Chrysanthemum segetum L. not indigenous

== Chrysocoma ==
Genus Chrysocoma:

- Chrysocoma acicularis Ehr.Bayer, endemic
- Chrysocoma candelabrum Ehr.Bayer, endemic
- Chrysocoma cernua L. endemic
- Chrysocoma ciliata L. indigenous
- Chrysocoma coma-aurea L. endemic
- Chrysocoma esterhuyseniae Ehr.Bayer, endemic
- Chrysocoma flava Ehr.Bayer, endemic
- Chrysocoma hantamensis J.C.Manning & Goldblatt, endemic
- Chrysocoma longifolia DC. endemic
- Chrysocoma microphylla Thunb. indigenous
- Chrysocoma mozambicensis Ehr.Bayer, indigenous
- Chrysocoma oblongifolia DC. endemic
- Chrysocoma obtusata (Thunb.) Ehr.Bayer, indigenous
- Chrysocoma puberula Merxm. indigenous
- Chrysocoma rigidula (DC.) Ehr.Bayer, endemic
- Chrysocoma schlechteri Ehr.Bayer, endemic
- Chrysocoma sparsifolia Hutch. endemic
- Chrysocoma strigosa Ehr.Bayer, endemic
- Chrysocoma tomentosa L. endemic
- Chrysocoma tridentata DC. endemic
- Chrysocoma undulata Thunb. accepted as Nidorella undulata (Thunb.) Sond. ex Harv. indigenous
- Chrysocoma valida Ehr.Bayer, endemic
- Cichorium intybus L. accepted as Cichorium intybus L. subsp. intybus, not indigenous, invasive
  - Cichorium intybus L. subsp. intybus, not indigenous, invasive

== Cineraria ==
Genus Cineraria:

- Cineraria albicans N.E.Br. indigenous
- Cineraria albomontana Hilliard, accepted as Bolandia pedunculosa (DC.) Cron, indigenous
- Cineraria alchemilloides DC. indigenous
  - Cineraria alchemilloides DC. subsp. alchemilloides, indigenous
- Cineraria angulosa Lam. endemic
- Cineraria arctotidea DC. accepted as Cineraria mollis E.Mey. ex DC. endemic
- Cineraria argillacea Cron, accepted as Bolandia argillacea (Cron) Cron
- Cineraria aspera Thunb. indigenous
- Cineraria atriplicifolia DC. endemic
- Cineraria austrotransvaalensis Cron, endemic
- Cineraria britteniae Hutch. & R.A.Dyer, accepted as Cineraria erodioides DC. var. erodioides, endemic
- Cineraria burkei Burtt Davy & Hutch. accepted as Cineraria aspera Thunb. endemic
- Cineraria cacalioides L.f. accepted as Crassothonna cacalioides (L.f.) B.Nord. endemic
- Cineraria canescens J.C.Wendl. ex Link, indigenous
  - Cineraria canescens J.C.Wendl. ex Link var. canescens, indigenous
  - Cineraria canescens J.C.Wendl. ex Link var. flabellifolia Harv. indigenous
- Cineraria cyanomontana Cron, endemic
- Cineraria decipiens Harv. indigenous
- Cineraria deltoidea Sond. endemic
- Cineraria dieterlenii E.Phillips, accepted as Cineraria erodioides DC. var. erodioides, indigenous
- Cineraria dregeana DC. accepted as Senecio gariepiensis Cron, endemic
- Cineraria dryogeton Cron, endemic
- Cineraria erodioides DC. indigenous
  - Cineraria erodioides DC. var. erodioides, indigenous
  - Cineraria erodioides DC. var. tomentosa Cron, indigenous
- Cineraria erosa (Thunb.) Harv. endemic
- Cineraria exilis DC. endemic
- Cineraria geifolia (L.) L. indigenous
- Cineraria geraniifolia DC. endemic
- Cineraria glandulosa Cron, endemic
- Cineraria grandibracteata Hilliard, endemic
- Cineraria hamiltoni S.Moore, accepted as Cineraria aspera Thunb.
- Cineraria hederifolia Cron, accepted as Senecio hederiformis Cron, endemic
- Cineraria humifusa L'Her. accepted as Cineraria angulosa Lam. endemic
- Cineraria lobata L'Her. endemic
  - Cineraria lobata L'Her. subsp. lasiocaulis Cron, indigenous
  - Cineraria lobata L'Her. subsp. lobata, indigenous
  - Cineraria lobata L'Her. subsp. platyptera Cron, indigenous
  - Cineraria lobata L'Her. subsp. soutpansbergensis Cron, indigenous
- Cineraria longipes S.Moore, endemic
- Cineraria lyrata DC. accepted as Cineraria lyratiformis Cron
- Cineraria lyratiformis Cron, indigenous
- Cineraria microglossa DC. accepted as Mesogramma apiifolium DC. endemic
- Cineraria mitellifolia L'Her. accepted as Senecio cordifolius L.f. endemic
- Cineraria mollis E.Mey. ex DC. indigenous
- Cineraria monticola Hutch. accepted as Cineraria deltoidea Sond. endemic
- Cineraria othonnites L. accepted as Crassothonna capensis (L.H.Bailey) B.Nord. indigenous
- Cineraria othonnoides Harv. endemic
- Cineraria parvifolia Burtt Davy, endemic
- Cineraria pedunculosa DC. accepted as Bolandia pedunculosa (DC.) Cron, endemic
- Cineraria pinnata O.Hoffm. ex Schinz, endemic
- Cineraria platycarpa DC. endemic
- Cineraria polycephala DC. accepted as Cineraria erodioides DC. var. erodioides, endemic
- Cineraria purpurata L. accepted as Mairia purpurata (L.) Goldblatt & J.C.Manning, indigenous
- Cineraria saxifraga DC. endemic
- Cineraria tomentosa (DC.) Less. accepted as Oresbia heterocarpa Cron & B.Nord. endemic
- Cineraria vagans Hilliard, endemic
- Cineraria vallis-pacis Dinter ex Merxm. indigenous

== Cirsium ==
Genus Cirsium:

- Cirsium arvense (L.) Scop. not indigenous
- Cirsium vulgare (Savi) Ten. not indigenous, invasive

== Cnicus ==
Genus Cnicus:

- Cnicus benedictus L. not indigenous

== Comborhiza ==
Genus Comborhiza:

- Comborhiza longipes (K.Bremer) Anderb. & K.Bremer, endemic
- Comborhiza virgata (N.E.Br.) Anderb. & K.Bremer, endemic

== Conyza ==
Genus Conyza:

- Conyza aegyptiaca (L.) Aiton, indigenous
- Conyza albida Willd. ex Spreng. accepted as Conyza sumatrensis (Retz.) E.Walker var. sumatrensis, not indigenous
- Conyza ambigua DC. accepted as Conyza bonariensis (L.) Cronquist
- Conyza arabidifolia J.Remy, accepted as Conyza chilensis Spreng.
- Conyza attenuata DC. indigenous
- Conyza bonariensis (L.) Cronquist, not indigenous
  - Conyza bonariensis (L.) Cronquist forma subleiotheca Cuatrec. accepted as Conyza sumatrensis (Retz.) E.Walker var. sumatrensis
  - Conyza bonariensis (L.) Cronquist var. microcephala (Cabrera) Cabrera, accepted as Conyza sumatrensis (Retz.) E.Walker var. sumatrensis
- Conyza canadensis (L.) Cronquist, not indigenous
- Conyza canescens L.f. accepted as Hilliardiella capensis (Houtt.) H.Rob. Skvarla & V.A.Funk, indigenous
- Conyza catharinensis Cabrera, accepted as Conyza chilensis Spreng.
- Conyza chilensis Spreng. not indigenous
- Conyza cinerea L. accepted as Cyanthillium cinereum (L.) H.Rob. not indigenous
- Conyza crispa (Pourr.) Rupr. accepted as Conyza bonariensis (L.) Cronquist
- Conyza floribunda Kunth var. subleiotheca (Cuatrec.) J.B.Marshall, accepted as Conyza sumatrensis (Retz.) E.Walker var. sumatrensis
- Conyza gouanii (L.) Willd. indigenous
- Conyza groegeri V.M.Badillo, accepted as Conyza sumatrensis (Retz.) E.Walker var. sumatrensis
- Conyza hispida Kunth, accepted as Conyza bonariensis (L.) Cronquist
- Conyza hochstetteri Sch.Bip. ex A.Rich. accepted as Conyza gouanii (L.) Willd. indigenous
- Conyza incisa Aiton, accepted as Conyza ulmifolia (Burm.f.) Kuntze, indigenous
- Conyza ivifolia (L.) Less. accepted as Conyza scabrida DC. indigenous
- Conyza linearis DC. accepted as Conyza bonariensis (L.) Cronquist
- Conyza linifolia (Willd.) Tackh. accepted as Conyza bonariensis (L.) Cronquist
- Conyza obscura DC. indigenous
- Conyza persicifolia (Benth.) Oliv. & Hiern, accepted as Conyza attenuata DC. indigenous
- Conyza pinifolia Lam. accepted as Hilliardiella capensis (Houtt.) H.Rob. Skvarla & V.A.Funk, indigenous
- Conyza pinnata (L.f.) Kuntze, indigenous
- Conyza pinnatifida (Thunb.) Less. endemic
- Conyza pinnatilobata DC. accepted as Conyza pinnata (L.f.) Kuntze, indigenous
- Conyza podocephala DC. indigenous
- Conyza scabrida DC. indigenous
- Conyza serratifolia Baker, accepted as Conyza attenuata DC. indigenous
- Conyza spiculosa (Hook. & Arn.) Zardini, accepted as Conyza bonariensis (L.) Cronquist
- Conyza squamata Spreng. accepted as Symphyotrichum squamatum (Spreng.) G.L.Nesom, not indigenous
- Conyza sumatrensis (Retz.) E.Walker, not indigenous
  - Conyza sumatrensis (Retz.) E.Walker var. sumatrensis, not indigenous
- Conyza transvaalensis Bremek. accepted as Conyza aegyptiaca (L.) Aiton, indigenous
- Conyza ulmifolia (Burm.f.) Kuntze, indigenous
- Conyzella canadensis (L.) Rupr. accepted as Conyza canadensis (L.) Cronquist
- Conyzella linifolia (Willd.) Green, accepted as Conyza bonariensis (L.) Cronquist
- Coreopsis lanceolata L. not indigenous, invasive
- Coreopsis tinctoria Nutt. not indigenous

== Corymbium ==
Genus Corymbium:

- Corymbium africanum L. indigenous
  - Corymbium africanum L. subsp. africanum, endemic
  - Corymbium africanum L. subsp. scabridum (P.J.Bergius) Weitz var. fourcadei, endemic
  - Corymbium africanum L. subsp. scabridum (P.J.Bergius) Weitz var. gramineum, endemic
  - Corymbium africanum L. subsp. scabridum (P.J.Bergius) Weitz var. scabridum, endemic
- Corymbium congestum E.Mey. ex DC. endemic
- Corymbium cymosum E.Mey. ex DC. endemic
- Corymbium elsiae Weitz, endemic
- Corymbium enerve Markotter, endemic
- Corymbium glabrum L. indigenous
  - Corymbium glabrum L. var. glabrum, endemic
  - Corymbium glabrum L. var. rogersii (Markotter) Weitz, endemic
- Corymbium laxum Compton, indigenous
  - Corymbium laxum Compton subsp. bolusii Weitz, endemic
  - Corymbium laxum Compton subsp. laxum, endemic
- Corymbium theileri Markotter, endemic
- Corymbium villosum L.f. endemic

== Cosmos ==
Genus Cosmos:

- Cosmos bipinnatus Cav. not indigenous
- Cosmos sulphureus Cav. not indigenous

== Cotula ==
Genus Cotula:

- Cotula andreae (E.Phillips) K.Bremer & Humphries, endemic
- Cotula anthemoides L. indigenous
- Cotula australis (Spreng.) Hook.f. indigenous
- Cotula barbata DC. endemic
- Cotula bipinnata Thunb. endemic
- Cotula bracteolata E.Mey. ex DC. endemic
- Cotula burchellii (DC.) Hutch. accepted as Foveolina burchellii (DC.) Magee, endemic
- Cotula ceniifolia DC. endemic
- Cotula coronopifolia L. indigenous
- Cotula dielsii Muschl. endemic
- Cotula discolor (DC.) J.C.Manning & Mucina, indigenous
- Cotula duckittiae (L.Bolus) K.Bremer & Humphries, endemic
- Cotula eckloniana (DC.) Levyns, endemic
- Cotula filifolia Thunb. endemic
- Cotula heterocarpa DC. endemic
- Cotula hispida (DC.) Harv. indigenous
- Cotula latifolia Pers. accepted as Dichrocephala integrifolia (L.f.) Kuntze subsp. integrifolia
- Cotula laxa DC. endemic
- Cotula leptalea DC. endemic
- Cotula lineariloba (DC.) Hilliard, indigenous
- Cotula loganii Hutch. endemic
- Cotula macroglossa Bolus ex Schltr. endemic
- Cotula maderaspatana (L.) Willd. accepted as Grangea maderaspatana (L.) Poir. indigenous
- Cotula mariae K.Bremer & Humphries, accepted as Cotula discolor (DC.) J.C.Manning & Mucina, endemic
- Cotula melaleuca Bolus, endemic
- Cotula membranifolia Hilliard, endemic
- Cotula microglossa (DC.) O.Hoffm. & Kuntze ex Kuntze, endemic
- Cotula montana Compton, endemic
- Cotula myriophylloides Harv. endemic
- Cotula nigellifolia (DC.) K.Bremer & Humphries, indigenous
  - Cotula nigellifolia (DC.) K.Bremer & Humphries var. nigellifolia, endemic
  - Cotula nigellifolia (DC.) K.Bremer & Humphries var. tenuior (DC.) P.P.J.Herman, endemic
- Cotula nudicaulis Thunb. endemic
- Cotula paludosa Hilliard, indigenous
- Cotula paradoxa Schinz, endemic
- Cotula pedicellata Compton, endemic
- Cotula pedunculata (Schltr.) E.Phillips, endemic
- Cotula pterocarpa DC. endemic
- Cotula pusilla Thunb. endemic
- Cotula radicalis (Killick & Claassen) Hilliard & B.L.Burtt, indigenous
- Cotula sericea L.f. endemic
- Cotula sericea Thunb. accepted as Cotula lineariloba (DC.) Hilliard
- Cotula socialis Hilliard, indigenous
- Cotula sororia DC. endemic
- Cotula tenella E.Mey. ex DC. indigenous
- Cotula thunbergii Harv. endemic
- Cotula turbinata L. endemic
- Cotula villosa DC. endemic
- Cotula vulgaris Levyns, endemic
- Cotula zeyheri Fenzl, endemic

== Crassocephalum ==
Genus Crassocephalum:

- Crassocephalum crepidioides (Benth.) S.Moore, indigenous
- Crassocephalum rubens (Juss. ex Jacq.) S.Moore, indigenous
  - Crassocephalum rubens (Juss. ex Jacq.) S.Moore var. rubens, indigenous
  - Crassocephalum rubens (Juss. ex Jacq.) S.Moore var. sarcobasis (DC.) C.Jeffrey & Beentje, indigenous
- Crassocephalum sarcobasis (DC.) S.Moore, accepted as Crassocephalum rubens (Juss. ex Jacq.) S.Moore var. sarcobasis (DC.) C.Jeffrey & Beentje, indigenous
- Crassocephalum x picridifolium (DC.) S.Moore, indigenous

== Crassothonna ==
Genus Crassothonna:

- Crassothonna alba (Compton) B.Nord. endemic
- Crassothonna cacalioides (L.f.) B.Nord. endemic
- Crassothonna capensis (L.H.Bailey) B.Nord. endemic
- Crassothonna clavifolia (Marloth) B.Nord. indigenous, near endemic
- Crassothonna cylindrica (Lam.) B.Nord. indigenous
- Crassothonna discoidea (Oilv. in Hook.) B.Nord. endemic
- Crassothonna floribunda (Schltr.) B.Nord. endemic
- Crassothonna opima (Merxm.) B.Nord. indigenous, near endemic
- Crassothonna patula (Schltr.) B.Nord. endemic
- Crassothonna protecta (Dinter) B.Nord. indigenous
- Crassothonna rechingeri (B.Nord.) B.Nord. endemic
- Crassothonna sedifolia (DC.) B.Nord. indigenous
- Crassothonna sparsiflora (S.Moore) B.Nord. accepted as Crassothonna alba (Compton) B.Nord. indigenous, near endemic

== Crepis ==
Genus Crepis:

- Crepis capillaris (L.) Wallr. not indigenous
- Crepis hypochaeridea (DC.) Thell. not indigenous, invasive

== Cullumia ==
Genus Callumia:

- Cullumia aculeata (Houtt.) Roessler, indigenous
  - Cullumia aculeata (Houtt.) Roessler var. aculeata, endemic
  - Cullumia aculeata (Houtt.) Roessler var. sublanata (DC.) Roessler, endemic
- Cullumia bisulca (Thunb.) Less. endemic
- Cullumia carlinoides DC. endemic
- Cullumia ciliaris (L.) R.Br. accepted as Cullumia reticulata (L.) Greuter, M.V.Agab. & Wagenitz, endemic
  - Cullumia ciliaris (L.) R.Br. subsp. angustifolia (Hutch.) Roessler, accepted as Cullumia reticulata (L.) Greuter, M.V.Agab. & Wagenitz, endemic
  - Cullumia ciliaris (L.) R.Br. var. angustifolia Hutch. accepted as Cullumia reticulata (L.) Greuter, M.V.Agab. & Wagenitz, indigenous
- Cullumia cirsioides DC. endemic
- Cullumia decurrens Less. endemic
- Cullumia floccosa E.Mey. ex DC. endemic
- Cullumia micracantha DC. endemic
- Cullumia patula (Thunb.) Less. indigenous
  - Cullumia patula (Thunb.) Less. subsp. patula, endemic
  - Cullumia patula (Thunb.) Less. subsp. uncinata Roessler, endemic
- Cullumia pectinata (Thunb.) Less. endemic
- Cullumia reticulata (L.) Greuter, M.V.Agab. & Wagenitz, endemic
- Cullumia rigida DC. endemic
- Cullumia selago Roessler, endemic
- Cullumia setosa (L.) R.Br. indigenous
  - Cullumia setosa (L.) R.Br. var. adnata (DC.) Harv. endemic
  - Cullumia setosa (L.) R.Br. var. araneosa Roessler, endemic
  - Cullumia setosa (L.) R.Br. var. microcephala Roessler, endemic
  - Cullumia setosa (L.) R.Br. var. setosa, endemic
- Cullumia squarrosa (L.) R.Br. endemic
- Cullumia sulcata (Thunb.) Less. indigenous
  - Cullumia sulcata (Thunb.) Less. var. intercedens Roessler, endemic
  - Cullumia sulcata (Thunb.) Less. var. sulcata, endemic

== Curio ==
Genus Curio:

- Curio archeri (Compton) P.V.Heath, accepted as Curio arcuarii (Compton) P.V.Heath
- Curio citriformis (G.D.Rowley) P.V.Heath, endemic
- Curio crassulifolius (DC.) P.V.Heath, endemic
- Curio hallianus (G.D.Rowley) P.V.Heath, endemic
- Curio repens (L.) P.V.Heath, endemic
- Curio talinoides (DC.) P.V.Heath, endemic
  - Curio talinoides (DC.) P.V.Heath var. aizoides (DC.) P.V.Heath, endemic

== Cuspidia ==
Genus Cuspidia:

- Cuspidia cernua (L.f.) B.L.Burtt, indigenous
  - Cuspidia cernua (L.f.) B.L.Burtt subsp. annua (Less.) Roessler, endemic
  - Cuspidia cernua (L.f.) B.L.Burtt subsp. cernua, endemic

== Cyanthillium ==
Genus Cyanthillium:

- Cyanthillium cinereum (L.) H.Rob. not indigenous
- Cyanthillium vernonioides (Muschl.) H.Rob. indigenous
- Cyanthillium wollastonii (S.Moore) H.Rob. Skvarla & V.A.Funk, indigenous

== Cymbopappus ==
Genus Cymbopappus:

- Cymbopappus adenosolen (Harv.) B.Nord. endemic
- Cymbopappus hilliardiae B.Nord. endemic
- Cymbopappus piliferus (Thell.) B.Nord. endemic

== Cypselodontia ==
Genus Cypselodontia:

- Cypselodontia eckloniana DC. accepted as Dicoma picta (Thunb.) Druce

== Decaneurum ==
Genus Decaneurum:

- Decaneurum amygdalinum (Delile) DC. accepted as Gymnanthemum amygdalinum (Delile) Sch.Bip. ex Walp. indigenous

== Delairea ==
Genus Delairea:

- Delairea odorata Lem. indigenous

== Denekia ==
Genus Denekia:

- Denekia capensis Thunb. indigenous

== Dicerothamnus ==
Genus Dicerothamnus:

- Dicerothamnus adpressus (Harv.) Koek., endemic
- Dicerothamnus rhinocerotis (L.f.) Koek., endemic

== Dichrocephala ==
Genus Dichrocephala:

- Dichrocephala auriculata (Thunb.) Druce, accepted as Dichrocephala integrifolia (L.f.) Kuntze subsp. integrifolia
- Dichrocephala capensis (Less.) DC. accepted as Dichrocephala integrifolia (L.f.) Kuntze subsp. integrifolia
- Dichrocephala integrifolia (L.f.) Kuntze, indigenous
- Dichrocephala integrifolia (L.f.) Kuntze subsp. integrifolia, indigenous

== Dicoma ==
Genus Dicoma:

- Dicoma anomala Sond. indigenous
- Dicoma anomala Sond. subsp. anomala, indigenous
- Dicoma anomala Sond. subsp. gerrardii (Harv. ex F.C.Wilson) S.Ortiz & Rodr.Oubina, indigenous
- Dicoma arenaria Bremek. indigenous
- Dicoma capensis Less. indigenous
- Dicoma fruticosa Compton, endemic
- Dicoma galpinii F.C.Wilson, indigenous
- Dicoma gerrardii Harv. ex F.C.Wilson, accepted as Dicoma anomala Sond. subsp. gerrardii (Harv. ex F.C.Wilson) S.Ortiz & Rodr.Oubina
- Dicoma kurumanii S.Ortiz & Netnou, endemic
- Dicoma macrocephala DC. indigenous
- Dicoma membranacea S.Moore, accepted as Macledium sessiliflorum (Harv.) S.Ortiz subsp. sessiliflorum var. membranaceum
- Dicoma montana Schweick. endemic
- Dicoma picta (Thunb.) Druce, endemic
- Dicoma pretoriensis C.A.Sm. accepted as Macledium pretoriense (C.A.Sm.) S.Ortiz
- Dicoma prostrata Schweick. endemic
- Dicoma relhanioides Less. accepted as Macledium relhanioides (Less.) S.Ortiz
- Dicoma schinzii O.Hoffm. indigenous
- Dicoma speciosa DC. accepted as Macledium speciosum (DC.) S.Ortiz
- Dicoma spinosa (L.) Druce, accepted as Macledium spinosum (L.) S.Ortiz
- Dicoma swazilandica S.Ortiz, Rodr.Oubina & Pulgar, indigenous
- Dicoma tomentosa Cass. indigenous
- Dicoma zeyheri Sond. accepted as Macledium zeyheri (Sond.) S.Ortiz, indigenous
- Dicoma zeyheri Sond. subsp. argyrophylla (Oliv.) G.V.Pope, accepted as Macledium zeyheri (Sond.) S.Ortiz subsp. argyrophyllum (Oliv.) S.Ortiz

== Didelta ==
Genus Didelta:

- Didelta carnosa (L.f.) Aiton, indigenous
- Didelta carnosa (L.f.) Aiton var. carnosa, indigenous
- Didelta carnosa (L.f.) Aiton var. tomentosa (Less.) Roessler, indigenous
- Didelta spinosa (L.f.) Aiton, indigenous

== Dimorphanthes ==
Genus Dimorphanthes:

- Dimorphanthes aegyptiaca (L.) Cass. accepted as Conyza aegyptiaca (L.) Aiton, indigenous

== Dimorphotheca ==
Genus Dimorphotheca:

- Dimorphotheca acutifolia Hutch. endemic
- Dimorphotheca barberae Harv. endemic
- Dimorphotheca caulescens Harv. indigenous
- Dimorphotheca chrysanthemifolia (Vent.) DC. endemic
- Dimorphotheca cuneata (Thunb.) Less. indigenous
- Dimorphotheca dregei DC. indigenous
- Dimorphotheca dregei DC. var. dregei, endemic
- Dimorphotheca dregei DC. var. reticulata (Norl.) B.Nord. endemic
- Dimorphotheca ecklonis DC. [1], endemic
- Dimorphotheca fruticosa (L.) Less. endemic
- Dimorphotheca graminifolia (L.) DC. accepted as Dimorphotheca nudicaulis (L.) DC. var. graminifolia (DC.) Harv. indigenous
- Dimorphotheca jucunda E.Phillips, indigenous
- Dimorphotheca montana Norl. endemic
- Dimorphotheca nudicaulis (L.) DC. indigenous
- Dimorphotheca nudicaulis (L.) DC. var. graminifolia (DC.) Harv. endemic
- Dimorphotheca nudicaulis (L.) DC. var. nudicaulis, endemic
- Dimorphotheca pinnata (Thunb.) Harv. indigenous
- Dimorphotheca pinnata (Thunb.) Harv. var. breve (Norl.) J.C.Manning, indigenous
- Dimorphotheca pinnata (Thunb.) Harv. var. pinnata, indigenous
- Dimorphotheca pluvialis (L.) Moench, indigenous
- Dimorphotheca polyptera DC. indigenous
- Dimorphotheca sinuata DC. indigenous
- Dimorphotheca spectabilis Schltr. endemic
- Dimorphotheca tragus (Aiton) B.Nord. [1], endemic
- Dimorphotheca venusta (Norl.) Norl. indigenous
- Dimorphotheca venusta (Norl.) Norl. var. amoena (Norl.) Norl. endemic
- Dimorphotheca venusta (Norl.) Norl. var. venusta, endemic
- Dimorphotheca walliana (Norl.) B.Nord. endemic
- Dimorphotheca zeyheri Sond. indigenous

== Disparago ==
Genus Disparago:

- Disparago anomala Schltr. ex Levyns, endemic
- Disparago barbata Koekemoer, endemic
- Disparago ericoides (P.J.Bergius) Gaertn. endemic
- Disparago gomphrenoides Sch.Bip. accepted as Elytropappus gnaphaloides (L.) Levyns
- Disparago gongylodes Koekemoer, endemic
- Disparago kolbei (Bolus) Hutch.
- Disparago kraussii Sch.Bip. endemic
- Disparago laxifolia DC. endemic
- Disparago pilosa Koekemoer, endemic
- Disparago tortilis (DC.) Sch.Bip. endemic

== Distephanus ==
Genus Distephanus:

- Distephanus angulifolius (DC.) H.Rob. & B.Kahn, indigenous
- Distephanus anisochaetoides (Sond.) H.Rob. & B.Kahn, indigenous
- Distephanus divaricatus (Steetz) H.Rob. & B.Kahn, indigenous
- Distephanus inhacensis (G.V.Pope) Boon & Glen, indigenous

== Dittrichia ==
Genus Dittrichia:

- Dittrichia graveolens (L.) Greuter, not indigenous

== Doellia ==
Genus Doellia:

- Doellia cafra (DC.) Anderb. indigenous

== Dolichothrix ==
Genus Dolichothrix:

- Dolichothrix ericoides (Lam.) Hilliard & B.L.Burtt, endemic

== Doria ==
Genus Doria:

- Doria undulata Thunb. accepted as Bolandia pinnatifida (Thunb.) J.C.Manning & Cron, indigenous

== Doronicum ==
Genus Doronicum:

- Doronicum asplenifolium Lam. accepted as Gerbera linnaei Cass. indigenous
- Doronicum pyrolaefolium Lam. accepted as Gerbera crocea (L.) Kuntze, indigenous
- Doronicum spinulosum Lam. accepted as Gerbera crocea (L.) Kuntze, indigenous

== Dymondia ==
Genus Dymondia:

- Dymondia margaretae Compton, endemic

== Eclipta ==
Genus Eclipta:

- Eclipta prostrata (L.) L. not indigenous

== Edmondia ==
Genus Edmondia:

- Edmondia fasciculata (Andrews) Hilliard, endemic
- Edmondia pinifolia (Lam.) Hilliard, endemic
- Edmondia sesamoides (L.) Hilliard, endemic

== Elephantopus ==
Genus Elephantopus:

- Elephantopus mollis Kunth, not indigenous, invasive

== Elytropappus ==
Genus Elytropappus:

- Elytropappus adpressus Harv. accepted as Dicerothamnus adpressus (Harv.) Koekemoer, ined.
- Elytropappus ambiguus DC. accepted as Elytropappus gnaphaloides (L.) Levyns, indigenous
- Elytropappus canescens DC. accepted as Elytropappus gnaphaloides (L.) Levyns
- Elytropappus cyathiformis DC. accepted as Elytropappus hispidus (L.f.) Druce
- Elytropappus glandulosus Less. endemic
  - Elytropappus glandulosus Less. var. ambiguus (DC.) Harv. accepted as Elytropappus gnaphaloides (L.) Levyns
  - Elytropappus glandulosus Less. var. longifolius DC. accepted as Stoebe muricata Spreng. ex Sch.Bip.
  - Elytropappus glandulosus Less. var. microphyllus DC. accepted as Elytropappus glandulosus Less. indigenous
  - Elytropappus glandulosus Less. var. microphyllus DC. accepted as Stoebe scabra L.f.
  - Elytropappus glandulosus Less. var. pallens DC. accepted as Stoebe muricata Spreng. ex Sch.Bip.
- Elytropappus gnaphaloides (L.) Levyns, endemic
- Elytropappus hispidus (L.f.) Druce, endemic
- Elytropappus longifolius (DC.) Levyns, accepted as Stoebe muricata Spreng. ex Sch.Bip. indigenous
- Elytropappus muricella Steud. ex Sch.Bip. accepted as Stoebe scabra L.f.
- Elytropappus scaber (L.f.) Druce, accepted as Stoebe scabra L.f. indigenous
- Elytropappus scaber Kuntze, accepted as Elytropappus gnaphaloides (L.) Levyns

== Emilia ==
Genus Emilia:

- Emilia ambifaria (S.Moore) C.Jeffrey, accepted as Emilia schinzii (O.Hoffm.) Cron, indigenous
- Emilia hantamensis J.C.Manning & Goldblatt, accepted as Bertilia hantamensis (J.C.Manning & Goldblatt) Cron, endemic
- Emilia limosa (O.Hoffm.) C.Jeffrey, indigenous
- Emilia schinzii (O.Hoffm.) Cron, indigenous
- Emilia transvaalensis (Bolus) C.Jeffrey, indigenous

== Enydra ==
Genus Enydra:

- Enydra fluctuans Lour. indigenous

== Erigeron ==
Genus Erigeron:

- Erigeron aegyptiacus L. accepted as Conyza aegyptiaca (L.) Aiton, indigenous
- Erigeron albidus (Willd. ex Spreng.) A.Gray, accepted as Conyza sumatrensis (Retz.) E.Walker var. sumatrensis, not indigenous
- Erigeron ambiguus (DC.) Sch.Bip. accepted as Conyza bonariensis (L.) Cronquist
- Erigeron bonariensis L. accepted as Conyza bonariensis (L.) Cronquist, not indigenous, invasive
- Erigeron bonariensis L. var. microcephalus Cabrera, accepted as Conyza sumatrensis (Retz.) E.Walker var. sumatrensis, not indigenous, invasive
- Erigeron canadensis L. accepted as Conyza canadensis (L.) Cronquist, not indigenous, invasive
- Erigeron capense Houtt. accepted as Hilliardiella capensis (Houtt.) H.Rob. Skvarla & V.A.Funk, indigenous
- Erigeron chilensis (Spreng.) D.Don ex G.Don, accepted as Conyza chilensis Spreng.
- Erigeron crispus Pourr. accepted as Conyza bonariensis (L.) Cronquist, not indigenous, invasive
- Erigeron gouanii L. accepted as Conyza gouanii (L.) Willd. indigenous
- Erigeron hochstetteri (Sch.Bip. ex A.Rich.) Sch.Bip. accepted as Conyza gouanii (L.) Willd. indigenous
- Erigeron incisum Thunb. accepted as Conyza ulmifolia (Burm.f.) Kuntze, indigenous
- Erigeron karvinskianus DC. not indigenous
- Erigeron kraussii Sch.Bip. accepted as Nidorella auriculata DC. indigenous
- Erigeron linifolius Willd. accepted as Conyza bonariensis (L.) Cronquist, not indigenous, invasive
- Erigeron persicifolius Benth. accepted as Conyza attenuata DC. indigenous
- Erigeron pinnatifidum Thunb. accepted as Conyza pinnatifida (Thunb.) Less. endemic
- Erigeron pinnatus L.f. accepted as Conyza pinnata (L.f.) Kuntze, indigenous
- Erigeron spiculosus Hook. & Arn. accepted as Conyza bonariensis (L.) Cronquist, not indigenous, invasive
- Erigeron sprengelii Sch.Bip. accepted as Nidorella auriculata DC. indigenous
- Erigeron sumatrensis Retz. accepted as Conyza sumatrensis (Retz.) E.Walker var. sumatrensis, not indigenous

== Eriocephalus ==
Genus Eriocephalus:

- Eriocephalus africanus L. indigenous
  - Eriocephalus africanus L. var. africanus, endemic
  - Eriocephalus africanus L. var. paniculatus (Cass.) M.A.N.Mull. P.P.J.Herman & Kolberg, endemic
- Eriocephalus ambiguus (DC.) M.A.N.Mull. indigenous
- Eriocephalus aromaticus C.A.Sm. endemic
- Eriocephalus aspalathoides DC. accepted as Eriocephalus decussatus Burch.
- Eriocephalus brevifolius (DC.) M.A.N.Mull. endemic
- Eriocephalus capitellatus DC. endemic
- Eriocephalus decussatus Burch. endemic
- Eriocephalus ericoides (L.f.) Druce, indigenous
  - Eriocephalus ericoides (L.f.) Druce subsp. ericoides, indigenous
  - Eriocephalus ericoides (L.f.) Druce subsp. griquensis M.A.N.Mull. endemic
- Eriocephalus eximius DC. indigenous
- Eriocephalus glandulosus M.A.N.Mull. endemic
- Eriocephalus grandiflorus M.A.N.Mull. endemic
- Eriocephalus hirsutus Burtt Davy, accepted as Eriocephalus luederitzianus O.Hoffm.
- Eriocephalus karooicus M.A.N.Mull. endemic
- Eriocephalus longifolius M.A.N.Mull. endemic
- Eriocephalus luederitzianus O.Hoffm. indigenous
- Eriocephalus macroglossus B.Nord. endemic
- Eriocephalus merxmuelleri M.A.N.Mull. indigenous
- Eriocephalus microcephalus DC. endemic
- Eriocephalus microphyllus DC. indigenous
  - Eriocephalus microphyllus DC. var. carnosus M.A.N.Mull. endemic
  - Eriocephalus microphyllus DC. var. microphyllus, endemic
  - Eriocephalus microphyllus DC. var. pubescens (DC.) M.A.N.Mull. endemic
- Eriocephalus namaquensis M.A.N.Mull. indigenous
- Eriocephalus pauperrimus Merxm. & Eberle, indigenous
- Eriocephalus pedicellaris DC. endemic
- Eriocephalus pteronioides DC. accepted as Eriocephalus pedicellaris DC.
- Eriocephalus pubescens DC. accepted as Eriocephalus microphyllus DC. var. pubescens (DC.) M.A.N.Mull.
- Eriocephalus punctulatus DC. indigenous
- Eriocephalus purpureus Burch. endemic
- Eriocephalus racemosus L. indigenous
  - Eriocephalus racemosus L. var. affinis (DC.) Harv. endemic
  - Eriocephalus racemosus L. var. racemosus, endemic
- Eriocephalus scariosissimus S.Moore, accepted as Eriocephalus scariosus DC.
- Eriocephalus scariosus DC. indigenous
- Eriocephalus septulifer DC. accepted as Eriocephalus africanus L. var. africanus
- Eriocephalus sericeus Gaudich. ex DC. accepted as Eriocephalus africanus L. var. paniculatus (Cass.) M.A.N.Mull. P.P.J.Herman & Kolberg
- Eriocephalus spinescens Burch. endemic
- Eriocephalus tenuifolius DC. indigenous
- Eriocephalus tenuipes C.A.Sm. endemic
- Eriocephalus xerophilus Schltr. accepted as Eriocephalus purpureus Burch.

== Erlangia ==
Genus Erlangia:

- Erlangea misera (Oliv. & Hiern) S.Moore, indigenous
- Erlangea vernonioides Muschl. accepted as Cyanthillium vernonioides (Muschl.) H.Rob. indigenous

== Eschenbachia ==
Genus Eschenbachia:

- Eschenbachia aegyptiaca (L.) Brouillet, accepted as Conyza aegyptiaca (L.) Aiton, indigenous
- Eschenbachia persicifolia (Benth.) Exell, accepted as Conyza attenuata DC. indigenous

== Ethulia ==
Genus Ethulia:

- Ethulia auriculata Thunb. accepted as Dichrocephala integrifolia (L.f.) Kuntze subsp. integrifolia
- Ethulia conyzoides L.f. not indigenous
  - Ethulia conyzoides L.f. subsp. conyzoides, not indigenous
  - Ethulia conyzoides L.f. subsp. kraussii (Walp.) M.G.Gilbert & C.Jeffrey, not indigenous
- Ethulia integrifolia (L.f.) D.Don, accepted as Dichrocephala integrifolia (L.f.) Kuntze subsp. integrifolia, indigenous

== Eumorphia ==
Genus Eumorphia:

- Eumorphia corymbosa E.Phillips, endemic
- Eumorphia davyi Bolus, endemic
- Eumorphia dregeana DC. endemic
- Eumorphia prostrata Bolus, indigenous
- Eumorphia sericea J.M.Wood & M.S.Evans, indigenous
  - Eumorphia sericea J.M.Wood & M.S.Evans subsp. robustior Hilliard & B.L.Burtt, endemic
  - Eumorphia sericea J.M.Wood & M.S.Evans subsp. sericea, indigenous

== Eupatorium ==
Genus Eupatorium:

- Eupatorium capense A.Spreng. accepted as Gymnanthemum capensis (A.Spreng.) J.C.Manning & Swelank. indigenous
- Eupatorium coloratum Willd. accepted as Gymnanthemum coloratum (Willd.) H.Rob. & B.Kahn, indigenous
- Eupatorium sordidum Less. accepted as Bartlettina sordida (Less.) R.M.King & H.Rob. not indigenous

== Euryops ==
Genus Euryops:

- Euryops abrotanifolius (L.) DC. endemic
- Euryops acraeus M.D.Hend. indigenous
- Euryops algoensis DC. endemic
- Euryops annae E.Phillips, indigenous
- Euryops annuus Compton, endemic
- Euryops anthemoides B.Nord. indigenous
  - Euryops anthemoides B.Nord. subsp. anthemoides, endemic
  - Euryops anthemoides B.Nord. subsp. astrotrichus B.Nord. endemic
- Euryops asparagoides (Licht. ex Less.) DC. indigenous
- Euryops bolusii B.Nord. endemic
- Euryops brachypodus (DC.) B.Nord. endemic
- Euryops brevilobus Compton, endemic
- Euryops brevipapposus M.D.Hend. indigenous
- Euryops brevipes B.Nord. endemic
- Euryops calvescens DC. endemic
- Euryops candollei Harv. indigenous
- Euryops chrysanthemoides (DC.) B.Nord. endemic
- Euryops ciliatus B.Nord. endemic
- Euryops cuneatus B.Nord. endemic
- Euryops decipiens Schltr. endemic
- Euryops decumbens B.Nord. indigenous
- Euryops dentatus B.Nord. endemic
- Euryops discoideus Burtt Davy, endemic
- Euryops dregeanus Sch.Bip. indigenous
- Euryops dyeri Hutch. endemic
- Euryops empetrifolius DC. indigenous
- Euryops erectus (Compton) B.Nord. endemic
- Euryops ericifolius (Bel.) B.Nord. endemic
- Euryops ericoides (L.f.) B.Nord. endemic
- Euryops euryopoides (DC.) B.Nord. endemic
- Euryops evansii Schltr. indigenous
  - Euryops evansii Schltr. subsp. evansii, indigenous
  - Euryops evansii Schltr. subsp. parvus B.Nord. indigenous
- Euryops exsudans B.Nord. & V.R.Clark, endemic
- Euryops floribundus N.E.Br. endemic
- Euryops galpinii Bolus, endemic
- Euryops gilfillanii Bolus, endemic
- Euryops glutinosus B.Nord. endemic
- Euryops gracilipes B.Nord. endemic
- Euryops hebecarpus (DC.) B.Nord. endemic
- Euryops hypnoides B.Nord. endemic
- Euryops imbricatus (Thunb.) DC. endemic
- Euryops indecorus B.Nord. endemic
- Euryops integrifolius B.Nord. endemic
- Euryops lasiocladus (DC.) B.Nord. endemic
- Euryops lateriflorus (L.f.) DC. indigenous
- Euryops latifolius B.Nord. endemic
- Euryops laxus (Harv.) Burtt Davy, indigenous
- Euryops leiocarpus (DC.) B.Nord. endemic
- Euryops linearis Harv. endemic
- Euryops linifolius (L.) DC. endemic
- Euryops longipes DC. indigenous
  - Euryops longipes DC. var. lasiocarpus B.Nord. endemic
  - Euryops longipes DC. var. longipes, endemic
- Euryops marlothii B.Nord. endemic
- Euryops microphyllus (Compton) B.Nord. endemic
- Euryops mirus B.Nord. endemic
- Euryops montanus Schltr. indigenous
- Euryops muirii C.A.Sm. endemic
- Euryops multifidus (Thunb.) DC. endemic
- Euryops munitus (L.f.) B.Nord. endemic
- Euryops namaquensis Schltr. endemic
- Euryops namibensis (Merxm.) B.Nord. indigenous
- Euryops nodosus B.Nord. endemic
  - Euryops oligoglossus DC. subsp. oligoglossus, indigenous
  - Euryops oligoglossus DC. subsp. racemosus (DC.) B.Nord. endemic
- Euryops othonnoides (DC.) B.Nord. endemic
- Euryops pectinatus (L.) Cass. indigenous
- Euryops pectinatus (L.) Cass. subsp. lobulatus B.Nord. endemic
- Euryops pectinatus (L.) Cass. subsp. pectinatus, endemic
- Euryops pedunculatus N.E.Br. indigenous
- Euryops petraeus B.Nord. endemic
- Euryops pinnatipartitus (DC.) B.Nord. endemic
- Euryops pleiodontus B.Nord. endemic
- Euryops polytrichoides (Harv.) B.Nord. endemic
- Euryops proteoides B.Nord. & V.R.Clark, endemic
- Euryops rehmannii Compton, endemic
- Euryops rosulatus B.Nord. endemic
- Euryops rupestris Schltr. indigenous
  - Euryops rupestris Schltr. var. dasycarpus B.Nord. endemic
  - Euryops rupestris Schltr. var. rupestris, endemic
- Euryops serra DC. endemic
- Euryops sparsiflorus S.Moore, accepted as Crassothonna alba (Compton) B.Nord.
- Euryops spathaceus DC. endemic
- Euryops speciosissimus DC. endemic
- Euryops subcarnosus DC. indigenous
  - Euryops subcarnosus DC. subsp. foetidus B.Nord. indigenous
  - Euryops subcarnosus DC. subsp. minor B.Nord. endemic
  - Euryops subcarnosus DC. subsp. subcarnosus, endemic
  - Euryops subcarnosus DC. subsp. vulgaris B.Nord. indigenous
- Euryops sulcatus (Thunb.) Harv. endemic
- Euryops tagetoides (DC.) B.Nord. endemic
- Euryops tenuilobus (DC.) B.Nord. endemic
- Euryops tenuissimus (L.) DC. indigenous
  - Euryops tenuissimus (L.) DC. subsp. tenuissimus, indigenous
  - Euryops tenuissimus (L.) DC. subsp. trifurcatus (L.f.) B.Nord. endemic
- Euryops thunbergii B.Nord. endemic
- Euryops transvaalensis Klatt, indigenous
  - Euryops transvaalensis Klatt subsp. setilobus (N.E.Br.) B.Nord. indigenous
  - Euryops transvaalensis Klatt subsp. transvaalensis, indigenous
- Euryops trifidus (L.f.) DC. endemic
- Euryops trilobus Harv. endemic
- Euryops tysonii E.Phillips, indigenous
- Euryops ursinoides B.Nord. endemic
- Euryops virgatus B.Nord. endemic
- Euryops virgineus (L.f.) DC. endemic
- Euryops wageneri Compton, endemic
- Euryops zeyheri B.Nord. endemic

== Facelis ==
Genus Facelis:

- Facelis retusa (Lam.) Sch.Bip. not indigenous

== Felicia ==
Genus Felicia:

- Felicia aculeata Grau, endemic
- Felicia aethiopica (Burm.f.) Bolus & Wolley-Dod ex Adamson & T.M.Salter, indigenous
  - Felicia aethiopica (Burm.f.) Bolus & Wolley-Dod ex Adamson & T.M.Salter subsp. aethiopica, endemic
  - Felicia aethiopica (Burm.f.) Bolus & Wolley-Dod ex Adamson & T.M.Salter subsp. ecklonis (Less.) Grau, endemic
- Felicia amelloides (L.) Voss, endemic
- Felicia amoena (Sch.Bip.) Levyns, indigenous
- Felicia amoena (Sch.Bip.) Levyns subsp. amoena, endemic
  - Felicia amoena (Sch.Bip.) Levyns subsp. latifolia Grau, endemic
  - Felicia amoena (Sch.Bip.) Levyns subsp. stricta (DC.) Grau, endemic
- Felicia annectens (Harv.) Grau, endemic
- Felicia australis (Alston) E.Phillips, endemic
- Felicia bechuanica Mattf. indigenous
- Felicia bellidioides Schltr. indigenous
  - Felicia bellidioides Schltr. subsp. bellidioides, endemic
  - Felicia bellidioides Schltr. subsp. foliata Grau, endemic
- Felicia bergeriana (Spreng.) O.Hoffm. endemic
- Felicia brevifolia (DC.) Grau, indigenous
- Felicia burkei (Harv.) L.Bolus, indigenous
- Felicia caespitosa Grau, indigenous
- Felicia cana DC. endemic
- Felicia canaliculata Grau, endemic
- Felicia clavipilosa Grau, indigenous
  - Felicia clavipilosa Grau subsp. clavipilosa, indigenous
  - Felicia clavipilosa Grau subsp. transvaalensis Grau, indigenous
- Felicia comptonii Grau, endemic
- Felicia cymbalariae (Aiton) Bolus & Wolley-Dod ex Adamson & T.M.Salter, indigenous
  - Felicia cymbalariae (Aiton) Bolus & Wolley-Dod ex Adamson & T.M.Salter subsp. cymbalariae, endemic
  - Felicia cymbalariae (Aiton) Bolus & Wolley-Dod ex Adamson & T.M.Salter subsp. ionops (Harv.) Grau, endemic
- Felicia cymbalarioides (DC.) Grau, endemic
- Felicia denticulata Grau, endemic
- Felicia deserti Schltr. ex Grau, endemic
- Felicia diffusa (DC.) Grau, indigenous
  - Felicia diffusa (DC.) Grau subsp. diffusa, endemic
  - Felicia diffusa (DC.) Grau subsp. khamiesbergensis Grau, endemic
- Felicia douglasii J.C.Manning & Magee, endemic
- Felicia drakensbergensis J.M.Wood & M.S.Evans, indigenous
- Felicia dregei DC. endemic
- Felicia dubia Cass. endemic
- Felicia ebracteata Grau, endemic
- Felicia echinata (Thunb.) Nees, endemic
- Felicia elongata (Thunb.) O.Hoffm. endemic
- Felicia erigeroides DC. endemic
- Felicia esterhuyseniae Grau, endemic
- Felicia fascicularis DC. indigenous
- Felicia ferulacea Compton, endemic
- Felicia filifolia (Vent.) Burtt Davy, indigenous
  - Felicia filifolia (Vent.) Burtt Davy subsp. bodkinii (Compton) Grau, endemic
  - Felicia filifolia (Vent.) Burtt Davy subsp. filifolia, indigenous
  - Felicia filifolia (Vent.) Burtt Davy subsp. schaeferi (Dinter) Grau, indigenous
  - Felicia filifolia (Vent.) Burtt Davy subsp. schlechteri (Compton) Grau, endemic
- Felicia flanaganii Bolus, endemic
- Felicia fruticosa (L.) G.Nicholson, indigenous
  - Felicia fruticosa (L.) G.Nicholson subsp. brevipedunculata (Hutch.) Grau, endemic
  - Felicia fruticosa (L.) G.Nicholson subsp. fruticosa, endemic
- Felicia heterophylla (Cass.) Grau, endemic
- Felicia hirsuta DC. indigenous
- Felicia hirta (Thunb.) Grau, endemic
- Felicia hispida (DC.) Grau, endemic
- Felicia hyssopifolia (P.J.Bergius) Nees, indigenous
  - Felicia hyssopifolia (P.J.Bergius) Nees subsp. glabra (DC.) Grau, endemic
  - Felicia hyssopifolia (P.J.Bergius) Nees subsp. hyssopifolia, endemic
  - Felicia hyssopifolia (P.J.Bergius) Nees subsp. polyphylla (Harv.) Grau, indigenous
- Felicia josephinae J.C.Manning & Goldblatt, endemic
- Felicia joubertinae Grau, indigenous
  - Felicia joubertinae Grau subsp. glabrescens Grau, endemic
  - Felicia joubertinae Grau subsp. joubertinae, endemic
- Felicia lasiocarpa DC. endemic
- Felicia linearis N.E.Br. indigenous
- Felicia linifolia (Harv.) Grau, endemic
- Felicia macrorrhiza (Thunb.) DC. endemic
- Felicia martinsiana S.Ortiz, endemic
- Felicia merxmuelleri Grau, endemic
- Felicia microcephala Grau, endemic
- Felicia microsperma DC. indigenous
- Felicia minima (Hutch.) Grau, endemic
- Felicia mossamedensis (Hiern) MendonÃ§a, indigenous
- Felicia muricata (Thunb.) Nees, indigenous
  - Felicia muricata (Thunb.) Nees subsp. cinerascens Grau, indigenous
  - Felicia muricata (Thunb.) Nees subsp. muricata, indigenous
  - Felicia muricata (Thunb.) Nees subsp. strictifolia Grau, endemic
- Felicia namaquana (Harv.) Merxm. indigenous
- Felicia nigrescens Grau, endemic
- Felicia nordenstamii Grau, endemic
- Felicia odorata Compton, endemic
- Felicia oleosa Grau, endemic
- Felicia ovata (Thunb.) Compton, endemic
- Felicia petiolata (Harv.) N.E.Br. indigenous
- Felicia puberula Grau, endemic
- Felicia quinquenervia (Klatt) Grau, indigenous
- Felicia rogersii S.Moore, endemic
- Felicia rosulata Yeo, indigenous
- Felicia scabrida (DC.) Range, endemic
- Felicia serrata (Thunb.) Grau, endemic
- Felicia stenophylla Grau, endemic
- Felicia tenella (L.) Nees, indigenous
  - Felicia tenella (L.) Nees subsp. cotuloides (DC.) Grau, endemic
  - Felicia tenella (L.) Nees subsp. longifolia (DC.) Grau, endemic
  - Felicia tenella (L.) Nees subsp. pusilla (Harv.) Grau, endemic
  - Felicia tenella (L.) Nees subsp. tenella, endemic
- Felicia tenera (DC.) Grau, endemic
- Felicia tsitsikamae Grau, endemic
- Felicia uliginosa (J.M.Wood & M.S.Evans) Grau, indigenous
- Felicia venusta S.Moore, endemic
- Felicia westae (Fourc.) Grau, endemic
- Felicia whitehillensis Compton, endemic
- Felicia wrightii Hilliard & B.L.Burtt, endemic
- Felicia zeyheri (Less.) Nees, indigenous
  - Felicia zeyheri (Less.) Nees subsp. linifolia (Harv.) Grau, endemic
  - Felicia zeyheri (Less.) Nees subsp. zeyheri, endemic

== Flaveria ==
Genus Flaveria:

- Flaveria bidentis (L.) Kuntze, not indigenous, invasive

== Foveolina ==
Genus Foveolina:

- Foveolina albida (DC.) Kallersjo, accepted as Foveolina dichotoma (DC.) Kallersjo
- Foveolina albidiformis (Thell.) Kallersjo, accepted as Foveolina burchellii (DC.) Magee, endemic
- Foveolina burchellii (DC.) Magee, indigenous
- Foveolina dichotoma (DC.) Kallersjo, indigenous
- Foveolina tenella (DC.) Kallersjo, endemic

== Gaillardia ==
Genus Gaillardia:

- Gaillardia aristata Pursh, not indigenous
- Gaillardia pulchella Foug. not indigenous

== Galeomma ==
Genus Galeomma:

- Galeomma oculus-cati (L.f.) Rauschert, endemic
- Galeomma stenolepis (S.Moore) Hilliard, indigenous

== Galinsoga ==
Genus Galinsoga:

- Galinsoga ciliata (Raf.) S.F.Blake, accepted as Galinsoga quadriradiata Ruiz & Pav. not indigenous
- Galinsoga parviflora Cav. not indigenous
- Galinsoga quadriradiata Ruiz & Pav. not indigenous, invasive

== Gamochaeta ==
Genus Gamochaeta:

- Gamochaeta calviceps (Fernald) Cabrera, not indigenous
- Gamochaeta coarctata (Willd.) Kerguelen, not indigenous
- Gamochaeta pensylvanica (Willd.) Cabrera, not indigenous
- Gamochaeta spicata (Lam.) Cabrera, accepted as Gamochaeta coarctata (Willd.) Kerguelen, not indigenous
- Gamochaeta spiciformis (Sch.Bip.) Cabrera, not indigenous
- Gamochaeta subfalcata (Cabrera) Cabrera, not indigenous

== Garuleum ==
Genus Garuleum:

- Garuleum album S.Moore, endemic
- Garuleum bipinnatum (Thunb.) Less., endemic
- Garuleum latifolium Harv. endemic
- Garuleum pinnatifidum (Thunb.) DC. endemic
- Garuleum schinzii O.Hoffm. indigenous
- Garuleum schinzii O.Hoffm. subsp. schinzii, indigenous
- Garuleum sonchifolium (DC.) Norl. endemic
- Garuleum tanacetifolium (MacOwan) Norl. endemic
- Garuleum woodii Schinz, indigenous

== Gazania ==
Genus Gazania:

- Gazania caespitosa Bolus, endemic
- Gazania ciliaris DC. endemic
- Gazania heterochaeta DC. indigenous
- Gazania jurineifolia DC. indigenous
  - Gazania jurineifolia DC. subsp. jurineifolia, endemic
  - Gazania jurineifolia DC. subsp. scabra (DC.) Roessler, indigenous
- Gazania krebsiana Less. indigenous
  - Gazania krebsiana Less. subsp. arctotoides (Less.) Roessler, indigenous
  - Gazania krebsiana Less. subsp. krebsiana, indigenous
  - Gazania krebsiana Less. subsp. serrulata (DC.) Roessler, indigenous
- Gazania lanata Magee & Boatwr. indigenous
- Gazania leiopoda (DC.) Roessler, endemic
- Gazania lichtensteinii Less. indigenous
- Gazania linearis (Thunb.) Druce, indigenous
  - Gazania linearis (Thunb.) Druce var. linearis, indigenous
  - Gazania linearis (Thunb.) Druce var. ovalis (Harv.) Roessler, endemic
- Gazania maritima Levyns, endemic
- Gazania othonnites (Thunb.) Less. endemic
- Gazania pectinata (Thunb.) Spreng. endemic
- Gazania rigens (L.) Gaertn. indigenous
  - Gazania rigens (L.) Gaertn. var. leucolaena (DC.) Roessler, endemic
  - Gazania rigens (L.) Gaertn. var. rigens, endemic
  - Gazania rigens (L.) Gaertn. var. uniflora (L.f.) Roessler, indigenous
- Gazania rigida (Burm.f.) Roessler, indigenous
- Gazania schenckii O.Hoffm. indigenous
- Gazania serrata DC. endemic
- Gazania splendidissima Mucina, Magee & Boatwr. indigenous
- Gazania tenuifolia Less. indigenous

== Geigeria ==
Genus Geigeria:

- Geigeria acaulis (Sch.Bip.) Benth. & Hook.f. ex Oliv. & Hiern, indigenous
- Geigeria aspera Harv. indigenous
  - Geigeria aspera Harv. var. aspera, indigenous
  - Geigeria aspera Harv. var. rivularis (J.M.Wood & M.S.Evans) Merxm. endemic
- Geigeria brevifolia (DC.) Harv. indigenous
- Geigeria burkei Harv. indigenous
  - Geigeria burkei Harv. subsp. burkei var. burkei, indigenous
  - Geigeria burkei Harv. subsp. burkei var. elata, indigenous
  - Geigeria burkei Harv. subsp. burkei var. hirtella, endemic
  - Geigeria burkei Harv. subsp. burkei var. intermedia, endemic
  - Geigeria burkei Harv. subsp. burkei var. zeyheri, indigenous
  - Geigeria burkei Harv. subsp. diffusa (Harv.) Merxm. indigenous
  - Geigeria burkei Harv. subsp. fruticulosa Merxm. indigenous
  - Geigeria burkei Harv. subsp. valida Merxm. endemic
- Geigeria elongata Alston, endemic
- Geigeria filifolia Mattf. indigenous
- Geigeria obtusifolia L.Bolus, indigenous
- Geigeria ornativa O.Hoffm. indigenous
- Geigeria ornativa O.Hoffm. subsp. ornativa, indigenous
- Geigeria pectidea (DC.) Harv. indigenous
- Geigeria vigintisquamea O.Hoffm. indigenous

== Gerbera ==
Genus Gerbera:

- Gerbera ambigua (Cass.) Sch.Bip. indigenous
- Gerbera asplenifolia (Lam.) Spreng. accepted as Gerbera linnaei Cass. indigenous
  - Gerbera asplenifolia (Lam.) Spreng. var. buxbaumii DC. accepted as Gerbera linnaei Cass. indigenous
  - Gerbera asplenifolia (Lam.) Spreng. var. linearis Harv. accepted as Gerbera serrata (Thunb.) Druce, indigenous
- Gerbera aurantiaca Sch.Bip. endemic
- Gerbera burmanni Cass. accepted as Gerbera crocea (L.) Kuntze, indigenous
  - Gerbera burmanni Cass. var. sinuata (Thunb.) Harv. accepted as Gerbera sinuata (Thunb.) Spreng. endemic
- Gerbera cordata (Thunb.) Less. endemic
- Gerbera coronopifolia (L.) Cass. accepted as Gerbera linnaei Cass. indigenous
- Gerbera crenata (Thunb.) Ker Gawl. accepted as Mairia crenata (Thunb.) Nees, indigenous
- Gerbera crocea (L.) Kuntze, endemic
- Gerbera ferruginea DC. accepted as Gerbera serrata (Thunb.) Druce, indigenous
  - Gerbera ferruginea DC. var. linearis (Harv.) Dummer, accepted as Gerbera serrata (Thunb.) Druce, indigenous
- Gerbera galpinii Klatt, indigenous
- Gerbera gerbera (L.) Kuntze, accepted as Gerbera linnaei Cass. indigenous
- Gerbera grandis J.C.Manning & Simka, endemic
- Gerbera hirsuta Spreng. ex DC. accepted as Gerbera tomentosa DC. indigenous
- Gerbera integralis Sond. ex Harv. accepted as Gerbera crocea (L.) Kuntze, indigenous
- Gerbera jamesonii Bolus ex Adlam, indigenous
- Gerbera lagascae Cass. accepted as Gerbera linnaei Cass. indigenous
- Gerbera lanata (Harv.) Dummer, accepted as Gerbera tomentosa DC. indigenous
- Gerbera leucothrix Harv. accepted as Gerbera tomentosa DC. indigenous
- Gerbera linnaei Cass. endemic
- Gerbera macrocephala Less. accepted as Gerbera crocea (L.) Kuntze, indigenous
- Gerbera microcephala Less. accepted as Gerbera tomentosa DC. indigenous
- Gerbera natalensis Sch.Bip. indigenous
- Gerbera ovata J.C.Manning & Simka, endemic
- Gerbera parva N.E.Br. endemic
- Gerbera piloselloides (L.) Cass. indigenous
- Gerbera serrata (Thunb.) Druce, endemic
- Gerbera sinuata (Thunb.) Spreng. endemic
  - Gerbera sinuata (Thunb.) Spreng. var. undulata Sch.Bip. accepted as Gerbera viridifolia (DC.) Sch.Bip. indigenous
- Gerbera sinuata Less. accepted as Gerbera serrata (Thunb.) Druce, indigenous
- Gerbera sylvicola I.M.Johnson, N.R.Crouch & T.J.Edwards, endemic
- Gerbera tomentosa DC. endemic
  - Gerbera tomentosa DC. var. elliptica DC. accepted as Gerbera ovata J.C.Manning & Simka, indigenous
  - Gerbera tomentosa DC. var. lanata Harv. accepted as Gerbera tomentosa DC. indigenous
  - Gerbera tomentosa DC. var. polyglossa DC. accepted as Gerbera tomentosa DC. indigenous
- ( Gerbera tomentosa DC. var. ustulata DC. accepted as Gerbera tomentosa DC. indigenous
- Gerbera viridifolia (DC.) Sch.Bip. indigenous
  - Gerbera viridifolia (DC.) Sch.Bip. subsp. natalensis (Sch.Bip.) H.V.Hansen, accepted as Gerbera natalensis Sch.Bip.
- Gerbera wrightii Harv. endemic

== Gibbaria ==
Genus Gibbaria:

- Gibbaria glabra (N.E.Br.) B.Nord. accepted as Osteospermum glabrum N.E.Br. endemic
- Gibbaria ilicifolia (L.) Norl. accepted as Osteospermum ilicifolium L. endemic
- Gibbaria scabra (Thunb.) Norl. accepted as Osteospermum scabrum Thunb. endemic

== Glebionis ==
Genus Glebionis:

- Glebionis coronaria (L.) Cass. ex Spach, not indigenous

== Gnaphalium ==
Genus Gnaphalium:

- Gnaphalium argyrocoma Sch.Bip. accepted as Dolichothrix ericoides (Lam.) Hilliard & B.L.Burtt, indigenous
- Gnaphalium austroafricanum Hilliard, indigenous
- Gnaphalium capense Hilliard, endemic
- Gnaphalium coarctatum Willd. accepted as Gamochaeta coarctata (Willd.) Kerguelen, not indigenous
- Gnaphalium confine Harv. indigenous
- Gnaphalium declinatum L.f. endemic
- Gnaphalium englerianum (O.Hoffm.) Hilliard & B.L.Burtt, endemic
- Gnaphalium filagopsis Hilliard & B.L.Burtt, indigenous
- Gnaphalium gnaphalodes (DC.) Hilliard & B.L.Burtt, endemic
- Gnaphalium griquense Hilliard & B.L.Burtt, indigenous
- Gnaphalium limicola Hilliard, indigenous
- Gnaphalium nelsonii Burtt Davy, endemic
- Gnaphalium pauciflorum DC. endemic
- Gnaphalium polycaulon Pers. not indigenous
- Gnaphalium simii (Bolus) Hilliard & B.L.Burtt, endemic
- Gnaphalium subfalcatum Cabrera, accepted as Gamochaeta subfalcata (Cabrera) Cabrera, not indigenous
- Gnaphalium vestitum Thunb. endemic

== Gongrothamnus ==
Genus Gongrothamnus:

- Gongrothamnus aurantiacus O.Hoffm. accepted as Distephanus divaricatus (Steetz) H.Rob. & B.Kahn, indigenous
- Gongrothamnus divaricatus Steetz, accepted as Distephanus divaricatus (Steetz) H.Rob. & B.Kahn, indigenous

== Gongyloglossa ==
Genus Gongyloglossa:

- Gongyloglossa tortilis (DC.) Koekemoer, ined. accepted as Disparago tortilis (DC.) Sch.Bip. endemic

== Gorteria ==
Genus Gorteria:

- Gorteria alienata (Thunb.) Stangb. & Anderb. endemic
- Gorteria ciliaris L. accepted as Cullumia reticulata (L.) Greuter, M.V.Agab. & Wagenitz, indigenous
- Gorteria corymbosa DC. indigenous
- Gorteria diffusa Thunb. indigenous
  - Gorteria diffusa Thunb. subsp. calendulacea (DC.) Roessler, accepted as Gorteria diffusa Thunb. subsp. diffusa, endemic
  - Gorteria diffusa Thunb. subsp. diffusa, indigenous
- Gorteria personata L. indigenous
  - Gorteria personata L. subsp. gracilis Roessler, accepted as Gorteria piloselloides (Cass.) Stangb. & Anderb. endemic
  - Gorteria personata L. subsp. personata, endemic
- Gorteria piloselloides (Cass.) Stangb. & Anderb. endemic
- Gorteria warmbadica Stangb. & Anderb. indigenous

== Grangea ==
Genus Grangea:

- Grangea adansonii Cass. accepted as Grangea maderaspatana (L.) Poir. indigenous
- Grangea maderaspatana (L.) Poir. indigenous

== Guizotia ==
Genus Guizotia:

- Guizotia abyssinica (L.f.) Cass. not indigenous

== Gymnanthemum ==
Genus Gymnanthemum:

- Gymnanthemum amygdalinum (Delile) Sch.Bip. ex Walp. indigenous
- Gymnanthemum capensis (A.Spreng.) J.C.Manning & Swelank. indigenous
- Gymnanthemum coloratum (Willd.) H.Rob. & B.Kahn, indigenous
- Gymnanthemum corymbosum (L.f.) H.Rob. indigenous
- Gymnanthemum crataegifolium (Hutch.) H.Rob. indigenous
- Gymnanthemum koekemoerae H.Rob. & V.A.Funk, endemic
- Gymnanthemum mespilifolium (Less.) H.Rob. accepted as Gymnanthemum capensis (A.Spreng.) J.C.Manning & Swelank. indigenous
- Gymnanthemum myrianthum (Hook.f.) H.Rob. indigenous
- Gymnanthemum theophrastifolium (Schweinf. ex Oliv. & Hiern) H.Rob. indigenous
- Gymnanthemum triflorum (Bremek.) H.Rob. endemic

== Gymnodiscus ==
Genus Gymnodiscus:

- Gymnodiscus capillaris (L.f.) DC. endemic
- Gymnodiscus linearifolia DC. endemic

== Gymnopentzia ==
Genus Gymnopentzia:

- Gymnopentzia bifurcata Benth. indigenous

== Gymnostephium ==
Genus Gymnostephium:

- Gymnostephium angustifolium Harv. accepted as Zyrphelis ciliaris (DC.) Zinnecker subsp. angustifolia (Harv.) Zinnecker, endemic
- Gymnostephium ciliare (DC.) Harv. accepted as Zyrphelis ciliaris (DC.) Zinnecker subsp. ciliaris, endemic
- Gymnostephium corymbosum (Turcz.) Harv. accepted as Zyrphelis nervosa Zinnecker, endemic
- Gymnostephium fruticosum DC. accepted as Zyrphelis fruticosa (DC.) Zinnecker, endemic
- Gymnostephium gracile Less. accepted as Zyrphelis gracilis (Less.) Zinnecker, endemic
- Gymnostephium hirsutum Less. accepted as Zyrphelis ciliaris (DC.) Zinnecker subsp. hirsuta (Less.) Zinnecker, endemic
- Gymnostephium leve Bolus, accepted as Zyrphelis levis (Bolus) Zinnecker, endemic
- Gymnostephium papposum G.L.Nesom, accepted as Zyrphelis corymbosa (Harv.) Kuntze, endemic

== Haplocarpha ==
Genus Haplocarpha:

- Haplocarpha lanata (Thunb.) Less. endemic
- Haplocarpha lyrata Harv. endemic
- Haplocarpha nervosa (Thunb.) Beauverd, indigenous
- Haplocarpha oocephala (DC.) Beyers, endemic
- Haplocarpha parvifolia (Schltr.) Beauverd, endemic
- Haplocarpha scaposa Harv. indigenous

== Hedypnois ==
Genus Hedypnois:

- Hedypnois cretica (L.) Dum.Cours. accepted as Hedypnois rhagadioloides (L.) F.W.Schmidt, not indigenous
- Hedypnois rhagadioloides (L.) F.W.Schmidt, not indigenous, invasive

== Helianthus ==
Genus Helianthus:

- Helianthus annuus L. not indigenous, invasive
- Helianthus argophyllus Torr. & A.Gray, not indigenous
- Helianthus debilis Nutt. subsp. cucumerifolius (Torr. & A.Gray) Heiser, not indigenous

== Helichrysopsis ==
Genus Helichrysopsis:

- Helichrysopsis septentrionalis (Vatke) Hilliard, indigenous

== Helichrysum ==
Genus Helichrysum:

- Helichrysum acrophilum Bolus, endemic
- Helichrysum acutatum DC. indigenous
- Helichrysum adenocarpum DC. indigenous
  - Helichrysum adenocarpum DC. subsp. adenocarpum, indigenous
  - Helichrysum adenocarpum DC. subsp. ammophilum Hilliard, indigenous
- Helichrysum albanense Hilliard, endemic
- Helichrysum albertense Hilliard, endemic
- Helichrysum albilanatum Hilliard, endemic
- Helichrysum albirosulatum Killick, indigenous
- Helichrysum albo-brunneum S.Moore, indigenous
- Helichrysum album N.E.Br. endemic
- Helichrysum allioides Less. endemic
- Helichrysum alsinoides DC. indigenous
- Helichrysum alticolum Bolus, endemic
- Helichrysum altigenum Schltr. & Moeser, endemic
- Helichrysum ammitophilum Hilliard, indigenous
- Helichrysum amplectens Hilliard, endemic
- Helichrysum anomalum Less. indigenous
- Helichrysum appendiculatum (L.f.) Less. indigenous
- Helichrysum archeri Compton, endemic
- Helichrysum arenicola M.D.Hend. indigenous
- Helichrysum aretioides Turcz. accepted as Bryomorphe aretioides (Turcz.) Druce, indigenous
- Helichrysum argentissimum J.M.Wood, indigenous
- Helichrysum argyrolepis MacOwan, indigenous
- Helichrysum argyrophyllum DC. endemic
- Helichrysum argyrosphaerum DC. indigenous
- Helichrysum asperum (Thunb.) Hilliard & B.L.Burtt, indigenous
  - Helichrysum asperum (Thunb.) Hilliard & B.L.Burtt var. albidulum (DC.) Hilliard, indigenous
  - Helichrysum asperum (Thunb.) Hilliard & B.L.Burtt var. appressifolium (Moeser) Hilliard, endemic
  - Helichrysum asperum (Thunb.) Hilliard & B.L.Burtt var. asperum, endemic
  - Helichrysum asperum (Thunb.) Hilliard & B.L.Burtt var. comosum (Sch.Bip.) Hilliard, endemic
  - Helichrysum asperum (Thunb.) Hilliard & B.L.Burtt var. glabrum Hilliard, endemic
- Helichrysum athrixiifolium (Kuntze) Moeser, indigenous
- Helichrysum aureofolium Hilliard, endemic
- Helichrysum aureolum Hilliard, indigenous
- Helichrysum aureonitens Sch.Bip. indigenous
- Helichrysum aureum (Houtt.) Merr. indigenous
  - Helichrysum aureum (Houtt.) Merr. var. argenteum Hilliard, endemic
  - Helichrysum aureum (Houtt.) Merr. var. aureum, endemic
  - Helichrysum aureum (Houtt.) Merr. var. candidum Hilliard, indigenous
  - Helichrysum aureum (Houtt.) Merr. var. monocephalum (DC.) Hilliard, indigenous
  - Helichrysum aureum (Houtt.) Merr. var. scopulosum (M.D.Hend.) Hilliard, endemic
  - Helichrysum aureum (Houtt.) Merr. var. serotinum Hilliard, indigenous
- Helichrysum auriceps Hilliard, endemic
- Helichrysum bachmannii Klatt, endemic
- Helichrysum basalticum Hilliard, indigenous
- Helichrysum bellidiastrum Moeser, indigenous
- Helichrysum bellum Hilliard, indigenous
- Helichrysum caespititium (DC.) Harv. indigenous
- Helichrysum callicomum Harv. indigenous
- Helichrysum calocephalum Klatt, indigenous
- Helichrysum candolleanum H.Buek, indigenous
- Helichrysum capense Hilliard, endemic
- Helichrysum catipes (DC.) Harv. endemic
- Helichrysum cephaloideum DC. indigenous
- Helichrysum cerastioides DC. indigenous
  - Helichrysum cerastioides DC. var. cerastioides, indigenous
- Helichrysum chionosphaerum DC. indigenous
- Helichrysum chrysargyrum Moeser, indigenous
- Helichrysum citricephalum Hilliard & B.L.Burtt, endemic
- Helichrysum cochleariforme DC. endemic
- Helichrysum confertifolium Klatt, endemic
- Helichrysum confertum N.E.Br. indigenous
- Helichrysum cooperi Harv. indigenous
- Helichrysum coriaceum Harv. accepted as Helichrysum nudifolium (L.) Less. var. nudifolium
- Helichrysum crispum (L.) D.Don, endemic
- Helichrysum cylindriflorum (L.) Hilliard & B.L.Burtt, endemic
- Helichrysum cymosum (L.) D.Don, indigenous
  - Helichrysum cymosum (L.) D.Don subsp. calvum Hilliard, indigenous
  - Helichrysum cymosum (L.) D.Don subsp. cymosum, endemic
- Helichrysum dasyanthum (Willd.) Sweet, endemic
- Helichrysum dasycephalum O.Hoffm. indigenous
- Helichrysum dasymallum Hilliard, indigenous
- Helichrysum decorum DC. indigenous
- Helichrysum difficile Hilliard, indigenous
- Helichrysum diffusum DC. endemic
- Helichrysum drakensbergense Killick, endemic
- Helichrysum dregeanum Sond. & Harv. indigenous
- Helichrysum dunense Hilliard, endemic
- Helichrysum ecklonis Sond. indigenous
- Helichrysum edwardsii Wild, indigenous
- Helichrysum elegantissimum DC. indigenous
- Helichrysum epapposum Bolus, indigenous
- Helichrysum ephelos Hilliard, endemic
- Helichrysum ericoides (Lam.) Pers. accepted as Dolichothrix ericoides (Lam.) Hilliard & B.L.Burtt, indigenous
- Helichrysum evansii Hilliard, indigenous
- Helichrysum excisum (Thunb.) Less. endemic
- Helichrysum felinum Less. endemic
- Helichrysum flanaganii Bolus, indigenous
- Helichrysum foetidum (L.) Moench, indigenous
  - Helichrysum foetidum (L.) Moench var. foetidum, endemic
- Helichrysum fourcadei Hilliard, endemic
- Helichrysum fruticans (L.) D.Don, endemic
- Helichrysum fulvum N.E.Br. endemic
- Helichrysum galpinii N.E.Br. indigenous
- Helichrysum gariepinum DC. indigenous
- Helichrysum gerberifolium Sch.Bip. ex A.Rich. accepted as Helichrysum nudifolium (L.) Less. var. nudifolium
- Helichrysum glaciale Hilliard, indigenous
- Helichrysum glomeratum Klatt, indigenous
- Helichrysum grandibracteatum M.D.Hend. indigenous
- Helichrysum grandiflorum (L.) D.Don, endemic
- Helichrysum griseolanatum Hilliard, indigenous
- Helichrysum griseum Sond. endemic
- Helichrysum gymnocomum DC. indigenous
- Helichrysum hamulosum E.Mey. ex DC. endemic
- Helichrysum harveyanum Wild, indigenous
- Helichrysum haygarthii Bolus, endemic
- Helichrysum hebelepis DC. endemic
- Helichrysum helianthemifolium (L.) D.Don, endemic
- Helichrysum herbaceum (Andrews) Sweet, indigenous
- Helichrysum herniarioides DC. indigenous
- Helichrysum heterolasium Hilliard, indigenous
- Helichrysum homilochrysum S.Moore, indigenous
- Helichrysum hyphocephalum Hilliard, endemic
- Helichrysum hypoleucum Harv. endemic
- Helichrysum incarnatum DC. endemic
- Helichrysum indicum (L.) Grierson, endemic
- Helichrysum infaustum J.M.Wood & M.S.Evans, indigenous
- Helichrysum ingomense Hilliard, endemic
- Helichrysum inornatum Hilliard & B.L.Burtt, endemic
- Helichrysum interjacens Hilliard, indigenous
- Helichrysum interzonale Compton, endemic
- Helichrysum intricatum DC. endemic
- Helichrysum isolepis Bolus, endemic
- Helichrysum jubilatum Hilliard, endemic
- Helichrysum junodii Moeser, endemic
- Helichrysum kraussii Sch.Bip. indigenous
- Helichrysum krebsianum Less. endemic
- Helichrysum krookii Moeser, indigenous
- Helichrysum lambertianum DC. endemic
- Helichrysum lancifolium (Thunb.) Thunb. endemic
- Helichrysum leontonyx DC. indigenous
- Helichrysum lepidissimum S.Moore, indigenous
- Helichrysum leptorhizum DC. endemic
- Helichrysum lesliei Hilliard, endemic
- Helichrysum lineare DC. indigenous
- Helichrysum lineatum Bolus, indigenous
- Helichrysum lingulatum Hilliard, indigenous
- Helichrysum litorale Bolus, endemic
- Helichrysum longifolium DC. indigenous
- Helichrysum longinquum Hilliard, endemic
- Helichrysum lucilioides Less. indigenous
- Helichrysum marginatum DC. indigenous
- Helichrysum mariepscopicum Hilliard, endemic
- Helichrysum marifolium DC. endemic
- Helichrysum marmarolepis S.Moore, endemic
- Helichrysum melanacme DC. indigenous
- Helichrysum miconiifolium DC. indigenous
- Helichrysum micropoides DC. indigenous
- Helichrysum milfordiae Killick, indigenous
- Helichrysum milleri Hilliard, indigenous
- Helichrysum mimetes S.Moore, indigenous
- Helichrysum mixtum (Kuntze) Moeser, indigenous
  - Helichrysum mixtum (Kuntze) Moeser var. grandiceps Hilliard, indigenous
  - Helichrysum mixtum (Kuntze) Moeser var. mixtum, indigenous
- Helichrysum moeserianum Thell. endemic
- Helichrysum molestum Hilliard, indigenous
- Helichrysum mollifolium Hilliard, endemic
- Helichrysum montanum DC. indigenous
- Helichrysum monticola Hilliard, indigenous
- Helichrysum montis-cati Hilliard, endemic
- Helichrysum mundtii Harv. indigenous
- Helichrysum mutabile Hilliard, indigenous
- Helichrysum nanum Klatt, indigenous
- Helichrysum natalitium DC. endemic
- Helichrysum nimbicola Hilliard, indigenous
- Helichrysum niveum (L.) Less. endemic
- Helichrysum nudifolium (L.) Less. indigenous
  - Helichrysum nudifolium (L.) Less. var. nudifolium, indigenous
  - Helichrysum nudifolium (L.) Less. var. oxyphyllum (DC.) Beentje, indigenous
  - Helichrysum nudifolium (L.) Less. var. pilosellum (L.f.) Beentje, indigenous
- Helichrysum obductum Bolus, endemic
- Helichrysum obtusum (S.Moore) Moeser, indigenous
- Helichrysum odoratissimum (L.) Sweet, indigenous
  - Helichrysum odoratissimum (L.) Sweet var. lanatum Sond. accepted as Helichrysum odoratissimum (L.) Sweet
  - Helichrysum odoratissimum (L.) Sweet var. odoratissimum, indigenous
- Helichrysum oligopappum Bolus, endemic
- Helichrysum opacum Klatt, indigenous
- Helichrysum oreophilum Klatt, indigenous
- Helichrysum outeniquense Hilliard, endemic
- Helichrysum oxybelium DC. indigenous
- Helichrysum oxyphyllum DC. accepted as Helichrysum nudifolium (L.) Less. var. oxyphyllum (DC.) Beentje
- Helichrysum pagophilum M.D.Hend. indigenous
- Helichrysum paleatum Hilliard, indigenous
- Helichrysum pallidum DC. indigenous
- Helichrysum palustre Hilliard, indigenous
- Helichrysum panduratum O.Hoffm. indigenous
  - Helichrysum panduratum O.Hoffm. var. panduratum, endemic
  - Helichrysum panduratum O.Hoffm. var. transvaalense Moeser, indigenous
- Helichrysum pandurifolium Schrank, endemic
- Helichrysum pannosum DC. endemic
- Helichrysum paronychioides DC. indigenous
- Helichrysum patulum (L.) D.Don, endemic
- Helichrysum pedunculatum Hilliard & B.L.Burtt, indigenous
- Helichrysum pentzioides Less. endemic
- Helichrysum petiolare Hilliard & B.L.Burtt, endemic
- Helichrysum petraeum Hilliard, indigenous
- Helichrysum pilosellum (L.f.) Less. accepted as Helichrysum nudifolium (L.) Less. var. pilosellum (L.f.) Beentje
- Helichrysum platypterum DC. indigenous
- Helichrysum plebeium DC. endemic
- Helichrysum polycladum Klatt, indigenous
- Helichrysum populifolium DC. endemic
- Helichrysum praecinctum Klatt, endemic
- Helichrysum praecurrens Hilliard, indigenous
- Helichrysum psilolepis Harv. indigenous
- Helichrysum pulchellum DC. endemic
- Helichrysum pumilio (O.Hoffm.) Hilliard & B.L.Burtt, indigenous
  - Helichrysum pumilio (O.Hoffm.) Hilliard & B.L.Burtt subsp. fleckii (S.Moore) Hilliard, indigenous
  - Helichrysum pumilio (O.Hoffm.) Hilliard & B.L.Burtt subsp. pumilio, endemic
- Helichrysum qathlambanum Hilliard, indigenous
- Helichrysum reflexum N.E.Br. indigenous
- Helichrysum refractum Hilliard, endemic
- Helichrysum retortoides N.E.Br. indigenous
- Helichrysum retortum (L.) Willd. endemic
- Helichrysum revolutum (Thunb.) Less. indigenous
- Helichrysum rosum (P.J.Bergius) Less. indigenous
  - Helichrysum rosum (P.J.Bergius) Less. var. arcuatum Hilliard, endemic
  - Helichrysum rosum (P.J.Bergius) Less. var. rosum, endemic
- Helichrysum rotundatum Harv. endemic
- Helichrysum rotundifolium (Thunb.) Less. endemic
- Helichrysum ruderale Hilliard & B.L.Burtt, endemic
- Helichrysum rudolfii Hilliard, endemic
- Helichrysum rugulosum Less. indigenous
- Helichrysum rutilans (L.) D.Don, endemic
- Helichrysum saxicola Hilliard, endemic
- Helichrysum scabrum (Thunb.) Less. endemic
- Helichrysum scitulum Hilliard & B.L.Burtt, endemic
- Helichrysum sessile DC. endemic
- Helichrysum sessilioides Hilliard, indigenous
- Helichrysum setosum Harv. indigenous
- Helichrysum silvaticum Hilliard, indigenous
- Helichrysum simillimum DC. endemic
- Helichrysum simulans Harv. & Sond. endemic
- Helichrysum solitarium Hilliard, endemic
- Helichrysum sphaeroideum Moeser, endemic
- Helichrysum spiciforme DC. indigenous
- Helichrysum spiralepis Hilliard & B.L.Burtt, indigenous
- Helichrysum splendidum (Thunb.) Less. indigenous
- Helichrysum spodiophyllum Hilliard & B.L.Burtt, indigenous
- Helichrysum stellatum (L.) Less. endemic
- Helichrysum stenopterum DC. indigenous
- Helichrysum stoloniferum (L.f.) Willd. endemic
- Helichrysum subfalcatum Hilliard, indigenous
- Helichrysum subglomeratum Less. indigenous
- Helichrysum subluteum Burtt Davy, indigenous
- Helichrysum summo-montanum I.Verd. endemic
- Helichrysum sutherlandii Harv. indigenous
- Helichrysum swynnertonii S.Moore, indigenous
- Helichrysum tenax M.D.Hend. indigenous
  - Helichrysum tenax M.D.Hend. var. pallidum Hilliard & B.L.Burtt, endemic
  - Helichrysum tenax M.D.Hend. var. tenax, indigenous
- Helichrysum tenuiculum DC. endemic
- Helichrysum tenuifolium Killick, endemic
- Helichrysum teretifolium (L.) D.Don, endemic
- Helichrysum thapsus (Kuntze) Moeser, indigenous
- Helichrysum tinctum (Thunb.) Hilliard & B.L.Burtt, endemic
- Helichrysum tomentosulum (Klatt) Merxm. indigenous
- Helichrysum tomentosulum (Klatt) Merxm. subsp. aromaticum (Dinter) Merxm. indigenous
- Helichrysum tongense Hilliard, indigenous
- Helichrysum transmontanum Hilliard, indigenous
- Helichrysum tricostatum (Thunb.) Less. endemic
- Helichrysum trilineatum DC. indigenous
  - Helichrysum trilineatum DC. var. brevifolium Harv. accepted as Helichrysum trilineatum DC.
  - Helichrysum trilineatum DC. var. tomentosum Harv. accepted as Helichrysum trilineatum DC.
- Helichrysum truncatum Burtt Davy, indigenous
- Helichrysum tysonii Hilliard, endemic
- Helichrysum umbraculigerum Less. indigenous
- Helichrysum uninervium Burtt Davy, endemic
- Helichrysum vernum Hilliard, indigenous
- Helichrysum versicolor O.Hoffm. & Muschl. endemic
- Helichrysum wilmsii Moeser, indigenous
- Helichrysum witbergense Bolus, indigenous
- Helichrysum woodii N.E.Br. endemic
- Helichrysum xerochrysum DC. endemic
- Helichrysum zeyheri Less. indigenous
- Helichrysum zwartbergense Bolus, endemic

== Helminthotheca ==
Genus Helminthotheca:

- Helminthotheca echioides (L.) Holub, not indigenous, invasive

== Hertia ==
Genus Hertia:

- Hertia alata (Thunb.) Kuntze, endemic
- Hertia ciliata (Harv.) Kuntze, indigenous
- Hertia cluytiifolia (DC.) Kuntze, endemic
- Hertia kraussii (Sch.Bip.) Fourc. endemic
- Hertia pallens (DC.) Kuntze, indigenous

== Heterolepis ==
Genus Heterolepis:

- Heterolepis aliena (L.f.) Druce, endemic
- Heterolepis anomala J.C.Manning & Goldblatt, indigenous
- Heterolepis mitis (Burm.) DC. endemic
- Heterolepis peduncularis DC. endemic

== Heteromma ==
Genus Heteromma:

- Heteromma decurrens (DC.) O.Hoffm. indigenous
- Heteromma krookii (O.Hoffm. & Muschl.) Hilliard & B.L.Burtt, endemic
- Heteromma simplicifolium J.M.Wood & M.S.Evans, endemic

== Heterorhachis ==
Genus Heterorhachis:

- Heterorhachis aculeata (Burm.f.) Roessler, endemic
- Heterorhachis hystrix J.C.Manning & P.O.Karis, indigenous

== Hilliardia ==
Genus Hilliardia:

- Hilliardia zuurbergensis (Oliv.) B.Nord. endemic

== Hilliardiella ==
Genus Hilliardiella:

- Hilliardiella aristata (DC.) H.Rob. indigenous
- Hilliardiella capensis (Houtt.) H.Rob. Skvarla & V.A.Funk, indigenous
- Hilliardiella elaeagnoides (DC.) Swelank. & J.C.Manning, indigenous
- Hilliardiella flanaganii (E.Phillips) H.Rob. Skvarla & V.A.Funk, endemic
- Hilliardiella hirsuta (DC.) H.Rob. indigenous
- Hilliardiella nudicaulis (DC.) H.Rob. endemic
- Hilliardiella oligocephala (DC.) H.Rob. accepted as Hilliardiella elaeagnoides (DC.) Swelank. & J.C.Manning, indigenous
- Hilliardiella pinifolia (Lam.) H.Rob. accepted as Hilliardiella capensis (Houtt.) H.Rob. Skvarla & V.A.Funk, indigenous
- Hilliardiella pseudonatalensis (Wild) H.Rob. Skvarla & V.A.Funk, accepted as Hilliardiella aristata (DC.) H.Rob. indigenous
- Hilliardiella sutherlandii (Harv.) H.Rob. indigenous

== Hippia ==
Genus Hippia:

- Hippia bolusae Hutch. endemic
- Hippia frutescens (L.) L. endemic
- Hippia hirsuta DC. endemic
- Hippia hutchinsonii Merxm. endemic
- Hippia integrifolia L.f. accepted as Dichrocephala integrifolia (L.f.) Kuntze subsp. integrifolia, indigenous
- Hippia integrifolia Less. accepted as Hippia simplicior Magee & B.Busch, endemic
- Hippia montana Compton, endemic
- Hippia pilosa (P.J.Bergius) Druce, endemic
- Hippia simplicior Magee & B.Busch, indigenous
- Hippia trilobata Hutch. endemic

== Hirpicium ==
Genus Hirpicium:

- Hirpicium alienatum (Thunb.) Druce, accepted as Gorteria alienata (Thunb.) Stangb. & Anderb. indigenous
- Hirpicium armerioides (DC.) Roessler, indigenous
- Hirpicium bechuanense (S.Moore) Roessler, indigenous
- Hirpicium echinus Less. indigenous
- Hirpicium gazanioides (Harv.) Roessler, indigenous
- Hirpicium integrifolium (Thunb.) Less. endemic
- Hirpicium linearifolium (Bolus) Roessler, indigenous

== Hoplophyllum ==
Genus Hoplophyllum:

- Hoplophyllum ferox Sond. endemic
- Hoplophyllum spinosum DC. endemic

== Hydroidea ==
Genus Hydroidea:

- Hydroidea elsiae (Hilliard) P.O.Karis, endemic

== Hymenolepis ==
Genus Hymenolepis:

- Hymenolepis calva Magoswana & Magee, endemic
- Hymenolepis crithmifolia (L.) Greuter, M.V.Agab. & Wagenitz, endemic
- Hymenolepis cynopus K.Bremer & Kallersjo, endemic
- Hymenolepis dentata (DC.) Kallersjo, endemic
- Hymenolepis glabra Magoswana & Magee, endemic
- Hymenolepis gnidioides (S.Moore) Kallersjo, endemic
- Hymenolepis incisa DC. endemic
- Hymenolepis indivisa (Harv.) Kallersjo, endemic
- Hymenolepis parviflora (L.) DC. accepted as Hymenolepis crithmifolia (L.) Greuter, M.V.Agab. & Wagenitz, endemic
- Hymenolepis speciosa (Hutch.) Kallersjo, endemic

== Hyoseris ==
Genus Hyoseris:

- Hyoseris rhagadioloides L. accepted as Hedypnois rhagadioloides (L.) F.W.Schmidt, not indigenous

== Hypericophyllum ==
Genus Hypericophyllum:

- Hypericophyllum elatum (O.Hoffm.) N.E.Br. indigenous

== Hypochaeris ==
Genus Hypochaeris:

- Hypochaeris brasiliensis (Less.) Griseb. not indigenous
- Hypochaeris glabra L. not indigenous
- Hypochaeris microcephala (Sch.Bip.) Cabrera var. albiflora (Kuntze) Cabrera, not indigenous
- Hypochaeris radicata L. not indigenous

== Ifloga ==
Genus Ifloga:

- Ifloga ambigua Thell. accepted as Ifloga thellungiana Hilliard & B.L.Burtt, indigenous
- Ifloga anomala Hilliard, endemic
- Ifloga glomerata (Harv.) Schltr. indigenous
- Ifloga molluginoides (DC.) Hilliard, indigenous
- Ifloga repens (L.) Hilliard & B.L.Burtt, endemic
- Ifloga thellungiana Hilliard & B.L.Burtt, endemic
- Ifloga verticillata (L.f.) Fenzl, endemic

== Inezia ==
Genus Inezia:

- Inezia integrifolia (Klatt) E.Phillips, indigenous
- Inezia speciosa Brusse, endemic

== Inula ==
Genus Inula:

- Inula foetida L. accepted as Nidorella foetida (L.) DC. indigenous
- Inula glomerata Oliv. & Hiern, indigenous
- Inula graveolens (L.) Desf. accepted as Dittrichia graveolens (L.) Greuter
- Inula paniculata (Klatt) Burtt Davy, indigenous

== Inulanthera ==
Genus Inulanthera:

- Inulanthera calva (Hutch.) Kallersjo, indigenous
- Inulanthera coronopifolia (Harv.) Kallersjo, endemic
- Inulanthera dregeana (DC.) Kallersjo, endemic
- Inulanthera leucoclada (DC.) Kallersjo, endemic
- Inulanthera montana (J.M.Wood) Kallersjo, endemic
- Inulanthera thodei (Bolus) Kallersjo, indigenous
- Inulanthera tridens (Oliv.) Kallersjo, endemic

== Inuloides ==
Genus Inuloides:

- Inuloides tomentosa (L.f.) B.Nord. accepted as Osteospermum tomentosum (L.f.) Norl. endemic

== Iocaste ==
Genus Iocaste:

- Iocaste acicularis (E.Mey. ex DC.) Harv. accepted as Phymaspermum aciculare (E.Mey. ex Harv.) Benth. & Hook. ex B.D.Jacks. indigenous

== Keringa ==
Genus Keringa:

- Keringa amygdalina (Delile) Raf. accepted as Gymnanthemum amygdalinum (Delile) Sch.Bip. ex Walp. indigenous

== Kleinia ==
Genus Kleinia:

- Kleinia cephalophora Compton, indigenous
- Kleinia fulgens Hook.f. indigenous
- Kleinia galpinii Hook.f. indigenous
- Kleinia longiflora DC. indigenous
- Kleinia stapeliiformis (E.Phillips) Stapf, endemic
- Kleinia venteri Van Jaarsv. endemic

== Klenzea ==
Genus Klenzea:

- Klenzea lycopodioides Sch.Bip. accepted as Dolichothrix ericoides (Lam.) Hilliard & B.L.Burtt, indigenous

== Lachnospermum ==
Genus Lachnospermum:

- Lachnospermum fasciculatum (Thunb.) Baill. endemic
- Lachnospermum imbricatum (P.J.Bergius) Hilliard, endemic
- Lachnospermum umbellatum (L.f.) Pillans, endemic

== Lactuca ==
Genus Lactuca:

- Lactuca capensis Thunb. accepted as Lactuca inermis Forssk.
- Lactuca dregeana DC. endemic
- Lactuca indica L. not indigenous
- Lactuca inermis Forssk. indigenous
- Lactuca serriola L. not indigenous
- Lactuca tysonii (E.Phillips) C.Jeffrey, endemic

== Laevicarpa ==
Genus Laevicarpa:

- Laevicarpa kolbei (Bolus) Koekemoer, ined. accepted as Disparago kolbei (Bolus) Hutch. endemic

== Laggera ==
Genus Laggera:

- Laggera crispata (Vahl) Hepper & J.R.I.Wood, indigenous
- Laggera decurrens (Vahl) Hepper & J.R.I.Wood, indigenous

== Lamprocephalus ==
Genus Lamprocephalus:

- Lamprocephalus montanus B.Nord. endemic

== Langebergia ==
Genus Langebergia:

- Langebergia canescens (DC.) Anderb. endemic

== Lapsana ==
Genus Lapsana:

- Lapsana communis L. not indigenous, invasive

== Lasiopogon ==
Genus Lasiopogon:

- Lasiopogon brachypterus O.Hoffm. ex Zahlbr. endemic
- Lasiopogon debilis (Thunb.) Hilliard, endemic
- Lasiopogon glomerulatus (Harv.) Hilliard, indigenous
- Lasiopogon micropoides DC. indigenous
- Lasiopogon minutus (B.Nord.) Hilliard & B.L.Burtt, endemic
- Lasiopogon muscoides (Desf.) DC. indigenous
- Lasiopogon ponticulus Hilliard, indigenous

== Lasiopus ==
Genus Lasiopus:

- Lasiopus viridifolius DC. var. hisutus DC. accepted as Gerbera viridifolia (DC.) Sch.Bip. indigenous

== Lasiospermum ==
Genus Lasiospermum:

- Lasiospermum bipinnatum (Thunb.) Druce, indigenous
- Lasiospermum brachyglossum DC. indigenous
- Lasiospermum erectum (Lam.) Druce, accepted as Lasiospermum pedunculare Lag.
- Lasiospermum eriospermum (Pers.) G.Don, accepted as Lasiospermum pedunculare Lag.
- Lasiospermum pedunculare Lag. endemic
- Lasiospermum poterioides Hutch. endemic

== Launaea ==
Genus Launaea:

- Launaea intybacea (Jacq.) Beauverd, indigenous
- Launaea nana (Baker) Chiov. indigenous
- Launaea rarifolia (Oliv. & Hiern) Boulos, indigenous
- Launaea rarifolia (Oliv. & Hiern) Boulos var. rarifolia, indigenous
- Launaea sarmentosa (Willd.) Sch.Bip. ex Kuntze, indigenous

== Lepidostephium ==
Genus Lepidostephium:

- Lepidostephium asteroides (Bolus & Schltr.) Kroner, endemic
- Lepidostephium denticulatum Oliv. endemic

== Leptilon ==
Genus Leptilon:

- Leptilon bonariensis (L.) Small, accepted as Conyza bonariensis (L.) Cronquist
- Leptilon linifolium (Willd.) Small, accepted as Conyza bonariensis (L.) Cronquist

== Leucanthemum ==
Genus Leucanthemum:

- Leucanthemum vulgare Lam. not indigenous

== Leucoptera ==
Genus Leucoptera:

- Leucoptera nodosa (Thunb.) B.Nord. endemic
- Leucoptera oppositifolia B.Nord. endemic
- Leucoptera subcarnosa B.Nord. endemic

== Leysera ==
Genus Leysera:

- Leysera gnaphalodes (L.) L. indigenous
- Leysera tenella DC. indigenous

== Lidbeckia ==
Genus Lidbeckia:

- Lidbeckia lobata Thunb. accepted as Lidbeckia quinqueloba (L.f.) Cass.
- Lidbeckia pectinata P.J.Bergius, endemic
- Lidbeckia pinnata J.C.Manning & Helme, indigenous
- Lidbeckia quinqueloba (L.f.) Cass. endemic

== Linzia ==
Genus Linzia:

- Linzia gerberiformis (Oliv. & Hiern) H.Rob. indigenous
- Linzia gerberiformis (Oliv. & Hiern) H.Rob. subsp. macrocyanus (O.Hoffm.) Isawumi, accepted as Linzia gerberiformis (Oliv. & Hiern) H.Rob. indigenous
- Linzia glabra Steetz, indigenous

== Lipotriche ==
Genus Lipotriche:

- Lipotriche scandens (Schumach. & Thonn.) Orchard subsp. dregei (DC.) Orchard, indigenous
- Lipotriche marlothiana (O.Hoffm.) D.J.N.Hind, indigenous

== Litogyne ==
Genus Litogyne:

- Litogyne gariepina (DC.) Anderb. indigenous

== Lopholaena ==
Genus Lopholaena:

- Lopholaena cneorifolia (DC.) S.Moore, indigenous
- Lopholaena coriifolia (Sond.) E.Phillips & C.A.Sm. indigenous
- Lopholaena disticha (N.E.Br.) S.Moore, indigenous
- Lopholaena dregeana DC. endemic
- Lopholaena festiva Brusse, endemic
- Lopholaena longipes (Harv.) Thell. endemic
- Lopholaena platyphylla Benth. indigenous
- Lopholaena segmentata (Oliv.) S.Moore, indigenous

== Macledium ==
Genus Macledium:

- Macledium latifolium (DC.) S.Ortiz, endemic
- Macledium pretoriense (C.A.Sm.) S.Ortiz, endemic
- Macledium relhanioides (Less.) S.Ortiz, endemic
- Macledium speciosum (DC.) S.Ortiz, endemic
- Macledium spinosum (L.) S.Ortiz, endemic
- Macledium zeyheri (Sond.) S.Ortiz, indigenous
- Macledium zeyheri (Sond.) S.Ortiz subsp. argyrophyllum (Oliv.) S.Ortiz, endemic
- Macledium zeyheri (Sond.) S.Ortiz subsp. thyrsiflorum (Klatt) Netnou, endemic
- Macledium zeyheri (Sond.) S.Ortiz subsp. zeyheri, indigenous

== Macowania ==
Genus Macowania:

- Macowania conferta (Benth.) E.Phillips, endemic
- Macowania corymbosa M.D.Hend. endemic
- Macowania deflexa Hilliard & B.L.Burtt, endemic
- Macowania glandulosa N.E.Br. endemic
- Macowania hamata Hilliard & Burtt, endemic
- Macowania pinifolia (N.E.Br.) Kroner, indigenous
- Macowania pulvinaris N.E.Br. indigenous
- Macowania revoluta Oliv. endemic
- Macowania sororis Compton, indigenous
- Macowania tenuifolia M.D.Hend. endemic

== Mairia ==
Genus Mairia:

- Mairia burchellii DC. endemic
- Mairia coriacea Bolus, endemic
- Mairia corymbosa Harv. accepted as Zyrphelis corymbosa (Harv.) Kuntze
- Mairia crenata (Thunb.) Nees, endemic
- Mairia decumbens Schltr. accepted as Zyrphelis decumbens (Schltr.) G.L.Nesom
- Mairia ecklonis (DC.) Sond. accepted as Zyrphelis ecklonis (DC.) Kuntze subsp. ecklonis
- Mairia foliosa Harv. accepted as Zyrphelis foliosa (Harv.) Kuntze
- Mairia hirsuta DC. accepted as Mairia purpurata (L.) Goldblatt & J.C.Manning, endemic
- Mairia lasiocarpa DC. accepted as Zyrphelis lasiocarpa (DC.) Kuntze
- Mairia microcephala (Less.) DC. accepted as Zyrphelis microcephala (Less.) Nees subsp. microcephala
- Mairia montana Schltr. accepted as Zyrphelis montana (Schltr.) G.L.Nesom
- Mairia perezioides (Less.) Nees, accepted as Zyrphelis pilosella (Thunb.) Kuntze
- Mairia petiolata Zinnecker, indigenous
- Mairia purpurata (L.) Goldblatt & J.C.Manning, endemic
- Mairia robusta (Zinnecker) J.C.Manning & Goldblatt, indigenous
- Mairia taxifolia (L.) DC. accepted as Zyrphelis taxifolia (L.) Nees

== Mantisalca ==
Genus Mantisalca:

- Mantisalca salmantica (L.) Briq. & Cavill. not indigenous

== Marasmodes ==
Genus Marasmodes:

- Marasmodes beyersiana S.Ortiz, endemic
- Marasmodes defoliata S.Ortiz, endemic
- Marasmodes dummeri Bolus ex Hutch. endemic
- Marasmodes fasciculata S.Ortiz, endemic
- Marasmodes macrocephala S.Ortiz, endemic
- Marasmodes oligocephala DC. endemic
- Marasmodes oubinae S.Ortiz, endemic
- Marasmodes polycephala DC. endemic
- Marasmodes reflexa S.Ortiz, endemic
- Marasmodes schlechteri Magee & J.C.Manning, indigenous
- Marasmodes spinosa S.Ortiz, endemic
- Marasmodes trifida S.Ortiz, endemic
- Marasmodes undulata Compton, endemic

== Marsea ==
Genus Marsea:

- Marsea bonariensis (L.) V.M.Badillo, accepted as Conyza bonariensis (L.) Cronquist
- Marsea canadensis (L.) V.M.Badillo, accepted as Conyza canadensis (L.) Cronquist
- Marsea chilensis (Spreng.) V.M.Badillo, accepted as Conyza chilensis Spreng.

== Matricaria ==
Genus Matricaria:

- Matricaria andreae E.Phillips, accepted as Cotula andreae (E.Phillips) K.Bremer & Humphries
- Matricaria nigellifolia DC. var. nigellifolia, accepted as Cotula nigellifolia (DC.) K.Bremer & Humphries var. nigellifolia
- Matricaria nigellifolia DC. var. tenuior DC. accepted as Cotula nigellifolia (DC.) K.Bremer & Humphries var. tenuior (DC.) P.P.J.Herman

== Mesogramma ==
Genus Mesogramma:

- Mesogramma apiifolium DC. indigenous

== Metalasia ==
Genus Metalasia:

- Metalasia acuta P.O.Karis, endemic
- Metalasia adunca Less. endemic
- Metalasia agathosmoides Pillans, endemic
- Metalasia albescens P.O.Karis, endemic
- Metalasia alfredii Pillans, endemic
- Metalasia aurea D.Don, endemic
- Metalasia bodkinii L.Bolus, endemic
- Metalasia brevifolia (Lam.) Levyns, endemic
- Metalasia calcicola P.O.Karis, endemic
- Metalasia capitata (Lam.) Less. endemic
- Metalasia cephalotes (Thunb.) Less. endemic
- Metalasia compacta Zeyh. ex Sch.Bip. endemic
- Metalasia confusa Pillans, endemic
- Metalasia cymbifolia Harv. endemic
- Metalasia densa (Lam.) P.O.Karis, indigenous
- Metalasia distans (Schrank) DC. endemic
- Metalasia divergens (Thunb.) D.Don, indigenous
- Metalasia divergens (Thunb.) D.Don subsp. divergens, endemic
- Metalasia divergens (Thunb.) D.Don subsp. fusca P.O.Karis, endemic
- Metalasia dregeana DC. endemic
- Metalasia eburnea Bengtson & P.O.Karis, endemic
- Metalasia erectifolia Pillans, endemic
- Metalasia erubescens DC. endemic
- Metalasia fastigiata (Thunb.) D.Don, endemic
- Metalasia formosa Bengtson & P.O.Karis, endemic
- Metalasia galpinii L.Bolus, endemic
- Metalasia helmei P.O.Karis, endemic
- Metalasia humilis P.O.Karis, endemic
- Metalasia inversa P.O.Karis, endemic
- Metalasia juniperoides Pillans, endemic
- Metalasia lichtensteinii Less. endemic
- Metalasia luteola P.O.Karis, endemic
- Metalasia massonii S.Moore, endemic
- Metalasia montana P.O.Karis, endemic
- Metalasia muraltiifolia DC. endemic
- Metalasia muricata (L.) D.Don, endemic
- Metalasia namaquana P.O.Karis & Helme, indigenous
- Metalasia octoflora DC. endemic
- Metalasia oligocephala P.O.Karis, endemic
- Metalasia pallida Bolus, endemic
- Metalasia phillipsii L.Bolus, indigenous
- Metalasia phillipsii L.Bolus subsp. incurva (Pillans) P.O.Karis, endemic
- Metalasia phillipsii L.Bolus subsp. phillipsii, endemic
- Metalasia plicata P.O.Karis, endemic
- Metalasia pulchella (Cass.) P.O.Karis, endemic
- Metalasia pulcherrima Less. [2], indigenous
- Metalasia pulcherrima Less. forma pallescens (Harv.) P.O.Karis, endemic
- Metalasia pulcherrima Less. forma pulcherrima, endemic
- Metalasia pungens D.Don, endemic
- Metalasia quinqueflora DC. endemic
- Metalasia rhoderoides T.M.Salter, endemic
- Metalasia riparia T.M.Salter, endemic
- Metalasia rogersii S.Moore, endemic
- Metalasia seriphiifolia DC. endemic
- Metalasia serrata P.O.Karis, endemic
- Metalasia serrulata P.O.Karis, endemic
- Metalasia strictifolia Bolus, endemic
- Metalasia tenuifolia DC. endemic
- Metalasia tenuis P.O.Karis, endemic
- Metalasia tricolor Pillans, endemic
- Metalasia tristis Bengtson & P.O.Karis, endemic
- Metalasia trivialis P.O.Karis, endemic
- Metalasia umbelliformis P.O.Karis, endemic

== Microglossa ==
Genus Microglossa:

- Microglossa caffrorum (Less.) Grau, endemic
- Microglossa mespilifolia (Less.) B.L.Rob. endemic

== Mikania ==
Genus Mikania:

- Mikania capensis DC. indigenous
- Mikania natalensis DC. indigenous

== Mikaniopsis ==
Genus Mikaniopsis:

- Mikaniopsis cissampelina (DC.) C.Jeffrey, indigenous

== Minurothamnus ==
Genus Minurothamnus:

- Minurothamnus phagnaloides DC. accepted as Heterolepis aliena (L.f.) Druce

== Monoculus ==
Genus Monoculus:

- Monoculus hyoseroides (DC.) B.Nord. accepted as Osteospermum hyoseroides (DC.) Norl. endemic
- Monoculus monstrosus (Burm.f.) B.Nord. accepted as Osteospermum monstrosum (Burm.f.) J.C.Manning & Goldblatt, indigenous

== Montanoa ==
Genus Montanoa:

- Montanoa bipinnatifida (Kunth) K.Koch, not indigenous
- Montanoa hibiscifolia Benth. not indigenous, invasive

== Monticapra ==
Genus Monticapra:

- Monticapra barbata (Koekemoer) Koekemoer, ined. accepted as Disparago barbata Koekemoer, endemic
- Monticapra gongylodes (Koekemoer) Koekemoer, ined. accepted as Disparago gongylodes Koekemoer, endemic
- Monticapra pilosa (Koekemoer) Koekemoer, ined. accepted as Disparago pilosa Koekemoer, endemic

== Morysia ==
Genus Morysia:

- Morysia acerosa DC. accepted as Phymaspermum acerosum (DC.) Kallersjo, indigenous

== Myrovernix ==
Genus Myrovernix:

- Myrovernix glandulosus Koekemoer, ined. accepted as Elytropappus glandulosus Less. endemic
- Myrovernix gnaphaloides Koekemoer, ined. accepted as Elytropappus gnaphaloides (L.) Levyns, endemic
- Myrovernix intricata (Levyns) Koekemoer, ined. accepted as Stoebe intricata Levyns, endemic
- Myrovernix muricata (Spreng. ex Sch.Bip.) Koekemoer, ined. accepted as Stoebe muricata Spreng. ex Sch.Bip. endemic
- Myrovernix scaber (L.f.) Koekemoer, ined. accepted as Stoebe scabra L.f. endemic

== Myxopappus ==
Genus Myxopappus:

- Myxopappus acutilobus (DC.) Kallersjo, indigenous

== Namibithamnus ==
Genus Namibithamnus:

- Namibithamnus obionifolius (O.Hoffm.) H.Rob. Skvarla & V.A.Funk, indigenous

== Nephrotheca ==
Genus Nephrotheca:

- Nephrotheca ilicifolia (L.) B.Nord. & Kallersjo, accepted as Osteospermum ilicifolium L. endemic

== Nestlera ==
Genus Nestlera:

- Nestlera biennis (Jacq.) Spreng. endemic

== Nicolasia ==
Genus Nicolasia:

- Nicolasia nitens (O.Hoffm.) Eyles, indigenous
  - Nicolasia nitens (O.Hoffm.) Eyles var.nitens, indigenous
- Nicolasia stenoptera (O.Hoffm.) Merxm. indigenous
  - Nicolasia stenoptera (O.Hoffm.) Merxm. subsp.stenoptera, indigenous

== Nidorella ==
Genus Nidorella:

- Nidorella aegyptiaca (L.) J.C.Manning & Goldblatt, accepted as Conyza aegyptiaca (L.) Aiton, indigenous
- Nidorella agria Hilliard, indigenous
- Nidorella amplexicaulis DC. accepted as Nidorella undulata (Thunb.) Sond. ex Harv. indigenous
- Nidorella angustifolia O.Hoffm. accepted as Nidorella anomala Steetz, indigenous
- Nidorella anomala Steetz, indigenous
- Nidorella attenuata (DC.) J.C.Manning & Goldblatt, accepted as Conyza attenuata DC. indigenous
- Nidorella auriculata DC. indigenous
  - Nidorella auriculata DC. subsp.polycephala (DC.) Wild, accepted as Nidorella auriculata DC. indigenous
- Nidorella densifolia O.Hoffm. accepted as Nidorella resedifolia DC. subsp.resedifolia, indigenous
- Nidorella depauperata Harv. accepted as Nidorella anomala Steetz, indigenous
- Nidorella diversifolia Spreng. ex Steetz, accepted as Nidorella auriculata DC. indigenous
- Nidorella foetida (L.) DC. endemic
- Nidorella hirta DC. accepted as Nidorella resedifolia DC. subsp.resedifolia, indigenous
- Nidorella hottentotica DC. indigenous
  - Nidorella hottentotica DC. var.lanata Harv. accepted as Nidorella hottentotica DC. indigenous
- Nidorella hyssopifolia DC. accepted as Nidorella foetida (L.) DC. indigenous
  - Nidorella hyssopifolia DC. var.glabrata DC. accepted as Nidorella foetida (L.) DC. indigenous
- Nidorella ivifolia (L.) J.C.Manning & Goldblatt, accepted as Conyza scabrida DC. indigenous
- Nidorella kraussii (Sch.Bip. ex Walp.) Harv. accepted as Nidorella auriculata DC. indigenous
- Nidorella krookii O.Hoffm. accepted as Nidorella resedifolia DC. subsp.resedifolia, indigenous
- Nidorella linifolia DC. endemic
- Nidorella longifolia DC. accepted as Nidorella undulata (Thunb.) Sond. ex Harv. indigenous
- Nidorella membranifolia Steetz, accepted as Nidorella microcephala Steetz, indigenous
- Nidorella microcephala Steetz, indigenous
- Nidorella obovata DC. accepted as Nidorella auriculata DC. indigenous
- Nidorella obscura (DC.) J.C.Manning & Goldblatt, accepted as Conyza obscura DC. indigenous
- Nidorella pinnata (L.f.) J.C.Manning & Goldblatt, accepted as Conyza pinnata (L.f.) Kuntze, indigenous
- Nidorella pinnatifida (Thunb.) J.C.Manning & Goldblatt, accepted as Conyza pinnatifida (Thunb.) Less. endemic
- Nidorella pinnatilobata DC. accepted as Nidorella resedifolia DC. subsp.resedifolia, indigenous
- Nidorella podocephala (DC.) J.C.Manning & Goldblatt, accepted as Conyza podocephala DC. indigenous
- Nidorella polycephala DC. accepted as Nidorella auriculata DC. indigenous
- Nidorella punctulata DC. accepted as Psiadia punctulata (DC.) Vatke, indigenous
- Nidorella rapunculoides DC. accepted as Nidorella resedifolia DC. subsp.resedifolia, indigenous
- Nidorella resedifolia DC. indigenous
  - Nidorella resedifolia DC. subsp.microcephala (Steetz) Wild, accepted as Nidorella microcephala Steetz, indigenous
  - Nidorella resedifolia DC. subsp.resedifolia, indigenous
  - Nidorella resedifolia DC. var.subvillosa Merxm. accepted as Nidorella resedifolia DC. subsp.resedifolia, indigenous
- Nidorella senecionea DC. accepted as Nidorella auriculata DC. indigenous
  - Nidorella senecionea DC. var.albanensis DC. accepted as Nidorella auriculata DC. indigenous
- Nidorella solidaginea DC. accepted as Nidorella resedifolia DC. subsp.resedifolia, indigenous
- Nidorella sprengelii (Sch.Bip. ex Walp.) Harv. accepted as Nidorella auriculata DC. indigenous
- Nidorella tongensis Hilliard, endemic
- Nidorella ulmifolia (Burm.f.) J.C.Manning & Goldblatt, accepted as Conyza ulmifolia (Burm.f.) Kuntze, indigenous
- Nidorella undulata (Thunb.) Sond. ex Harv. indigenous

== Nolletia ==
Genus Nolletia:

- Nolletia annetjieae P.P.J.Herman, indigenous
- Nolletia arenosa O.Hoffm. accepted as Nolletia chrysocomoides (Desf.) Cass. ex Less. indigenous
- Nolletia ciliaris (DC.) Steetz, indigenous
- Nolletia ericoides Merxm. accepted as Nolletia ciliaris (DC.) Steetz
- Nolletia gariepina (DC.) Mattf. indigenous
- Nolletia jeanettae P.P.J.Herman, endemic
- Nolletia rarifolia (Turcz.) Steetz, endemic
- Nolletia ruderalis Hilliard, indigenous
- Nolletia vanhoepeniae P.P.J.Herman, indigenous

== Norlindhia ==
Genus Norlindhia:

- Norlindhia amplectens (Harv.) B.Nord. accepted as Osteospermum amplectens (Harv.) Norl. present
- Norlindhia breviradiata (Norl.) B.Nord. accepted as Osteospermum breviradiatum Norl. indigenous

== Oedera ==
Genus Oedera:

- Oedera capensis (L.) Druce, endemic
- Oedera conferta (Hutch.) Anderb. & K.Bremer, endemic
- Oedera epaleacea Beyers, endemic
- Oedera foveolata (K.Bremer) Anderb. & K.Bremer, endemic
- Oedera genistifolia (L.) Anderb. & K.Bremer, endemic
- Oedera hirta Thunb. endemic
- Oedera imbricata Lam. endemic
- Oedera intermedia DC. accepted as Oedera imbricata Lam. present
- Oedera laevis DC. endemic
- Oedera muirii C.A.Sm. accepted as Oedera laevis DC. present
- Oedera multipunctata (DC.) Anderb. & K.Bremer, endemic
- Oedera nordenstamii (K.Bremer) Anderb. & K.Bremer, endemic
- Oedera resinifera (K.Bremer) Anderb. & K.Bremer, endemic
- Oedera sedifolia (DC.) Anderb. & K.Bremer, endemic
- Oedera silicicola (K.Bremer) Anderb. & K.Bremer, endemic
- Oedera squarrosa (L.) Anderb. & K.Bremer, endemic
- Oedera steyniae (L.Bolus) Anderb. & K.Bremer, endemic
- Oedera uniflora (L.f.) Anderb. & K.Bremer, endemic
- Oedera viscosa (L'Her.) Anderb. & K.Bremer, endemic

== Oldenburgia ==
Genus Oldenburgia:

- Oldenburgia grandis (Thunb.) Baill. endemic
- Oldenburgia intermedia Bond, endemic
- Oldenburgia papionum DC. endemic
- Oldenburgia paradoxa Less. endemic

== Oligocarpus ==
Genus Oligocarpus:

- Oligocarpus acanthospermus (DC.) Bolus, accepted as Osteospermum acanthospermum (DC.) Norl. indigenous
- Oligocarpus calendulaceus (L.f.) Less. accepted APNI but Plants of the World Online gives Osteospermum calendulaceum L.f. as the accepted name - endemic.

== Oligoglossa ==
Genus Oligoglossa:

- Oligoglossa acicularis E.Mey. ex DC. accepted as Phymaspermum aciculare (E.Mey. ex Harv.) Benth. & Hook. ex B.D.Jacks. indigenous

== Oligothrix ==
Genus Oligothrix:

- Oligothrix gracilis DC. endemic

== Oncosiphon ==
Genus Oncosiphon:

- Oncosiphon africanus (P.J.Bergius) Kallersjo, endemic
- Oncosiphon glabratus (Thunb.) Kallersjo, accepted as Oncosiphon africanus (P.J.Bergius) Kallersjo, present
- Oncosiphon grandiflorus (Thunb.) Kallersjo, indigenous
- Oncosiphon intermedius (Hutch.) Kallersjo, endemic
- Oncosiphon piluliferus (L.f.) Kallersjo, indigenous
- Oncosiphon sabulosus (Wolley-Dod) Kallersjo, endemic
- Oncosiphon schlechteri (Bolus) Kallersjo, endemic
- Oncosiphon suffruticosus (L.) Kallersjo, indigenous

== Oocephala ==
Genus Oocephala:

- Oocephala centaureoides (Klatt) H.Rob. & Skvarla, indigenous
- Oocephala staehelinoides (Harv.) H.Rob. & Skvarla, endemic

== Orbivestus ==
Genus Orbivestus:

- Orbivestus cinerascens (Sch.Bip.) H.Rob. indigenous
- Orbivestus obionifolius (O.Hoffm.) J.C.Manning, accepted as Namibithamnus obionifolius (O.Hoffm.) H.Rob. Skvarla & V.A.Funk

== Oreoleysera ==
Genus Oreoleysera:

- Oreoleysera montana (Bolus) K.Bremer, endemic

== Oresbia ==
Genus Oresbia:

- Oresbia heterocarpa Cron & B.Nord. endemic

== Osmitopsis ==
Genus Osmitopsis:

- Osmitopsis afra (L.) K.Bremer, endemic
- Osmitopsis asteriscoides (P.J.Bergius) Less. endemic
- Osmitopsis dentata (Thunb.) K.Bremer, endemic
- Osmitopsis glabra K.Bremer, endemic
- Osmitopsis nana Schltr. endemic
- Osmitopsis osmitoides (Less.) K.Bremer, endemic
- Osmitopsis parvifolia (DC.) Hofmeyr, endemic
- Osmitopsis pinnatifida (DC.) K.Bremer, indigenous
- Osmitopsis pinnatifida (DC.) K.Bremer subsp.angustifolia (DC.) K.Bremer, endemic
- Osmitopsis pinnatifida (DC.) K.Bremer subsp.pinnatifida, endemic
- Osmitopsis pinnatifida (DC.) K.Bremer subsp.serrata K.Bremer, endemic
- Osmitopsis tenuis K.Bremer, endemic

== Osteospermum ==
Genus Osteospermum:

- Osteospermum acanthospermum (DC.) Norl. endemic
- Osteospermum aciphyllum DC. endemic
- Osteospermum acutifolium (Hutch.) Norl. accepted as Dimorphotheca acutifolia Hutch. present
- Osteospermum amplectens (Harv.) Norl. endemic
- Osteospermum armatum Norl. indigenous
- Osteospermum asperulum (DC.) Norl. endemic
- Osteospermum attenuatum Hilliard & B.L.Burtt, endemic
- Osteospermum auriculatum (S.Moore) Norl. endemic
- Osteospermum australe B.Nord. endemic
- Osteospermum barberae (Harv.) Norl. accepted as Dimorphotheca barberae Harv. present
- Osteospermum bidens Thunb. endemic
- Osteospermum bolusii (Compton) Norl. endemic
- Osteospermum breviradiatum Norl. indigenous
- Osteospermum burttianum B.Nord. endemic
- Osteospermum calcicola (J.C.Manning & Snijman) J.C.Manning & Goldblatt, endemic
- Osteospermum calendulaceum L.f. endemic
- Osteospermum caulescens Harv. accepted as Dimorphotheca caulescens Harv. present
- Osteospermum ciliatum P.J.Bergius, endemic
- Osteospermum clandestinum (Less.) Norl. accepted as Osteospermum monstrosum (Burm.f.) J.C.Manning & Goldblatt, indigenous
- Osteospermum connatum DC. endemic
- Osteospermum corymbosum L. endemic
- Osteospermum crassifolium (O.Hoffm.) Norl. indigenous
- Osteospermum dentatum Burm.f. endemic
- Osteospermum dregei (DC.) Norl. var.dregei, accepted as Dimorphotheca dregei DC. var.dregei, present
- Osteospermum dregei (DC.) Norl. var.reticulatum Norl. accepted as Dimorphotheca dregei DC. var.reticulata (Norl.) B.Nord. endemic
- Osteospermum ecklonis (DC.) Norl. accepted as Dimorphotheca ecklonis DC. present
- Osteospermum elsieae Norl. endemic
- Osteospermum fruticosum (L.) Norl. accepted as Dimorphotheca fruticosa (L.) Less. present
- Osteospermum glabrum N.E.Br. endemic
- Osteospermum grandidentatum DC. indigenous
- Osteospermum grandiflorum DC. endemic
- Osteospermum hafstroemii Norl. endemic
- Osteospermum herbaceum L.f. endemic
- Osteospermum hirsutum Thunb. endemic
- Osteospermum hispidum Harv. indigenous
- Osteospermum hispidum Harv. var.hispidum, endemic
- Osteospermum hispidum Harv. var.viride Norl. endemic
- Osteospermum hyoseroides (DC.) Norl. endemic
- Osteospermum ilicifolium L. endemic
- Osteospermum imbricatum L. indigenous
- Osteospermum imbricatum L. subsp.imbricatum, endemic
- Osteospermum imbricatum L. subsp.nervatum (DC.) Norl. var.helichrysoides, endemic
- Osteospermum imbricatum L. subsp.nervatum (DC.) Norl. var.nervatum, endemic
- Osteospermum incanum Burm.f. subsp.incanum, indigenous
- Osteospermum incanum Burm.f. subsp.subcanescens (DC.) J.C.Manning & Goldblatt, endemic
- Osteospermum jucundum (E.Phillips) Norl. accepted as Dimorphotheca jucunda E.Phillips, present
- Osteospermum junceum P.J.Bergius, endemic
- Osteospermum karrooicum (Bolus) Norl. indigenous
- Osteospermum lanceolatum DC. endemic
- Osteospermum leptolobum (Harv.) Norl. endemic
- Osteospermum microcarpum (Harv.) Norl. indigenous
- Osteospermum microcarpum (Harv.) Norl. subsp.microcarpum, indigenous
- Osteospermum microphyllum DC. indigenous
- Osteospermum moniliferum L. indigenous
- Osteospermum moniliferum L. subsp.canescens (DC.) J.C.Manning & Goldblatt, indigenous
- Osteospermum moniliferum L. subsp.moniliferum, indigenous
- Osteospermum moniliferum L. subsp.pisiferum (L.) J.C.Manning & Goldblatt, endemic
- Osteospermum moniliferum L. subsp.rotundatum (DC.) J.C.Manning & Goldblatt, indigenous
- Osteospermum moniliferum L. subsp.septentrionale (Norl.) J.C.Manning & Goldblatt, indigenous
- Osteospermum moniliferum L. var.pisiferum (L.) Harv. accepted as Osteospermum moniliferum L. subsp.pisiferum (L.) J.C.Manning & Goldblatt, endemic
- Osteospermum moniliferum L. var.rotundatum (DC.) Harv. accepted as Osteospermum moniliferum L. subsp.rotundatum (DC.) J.C.Manning & Goldblatt, indigenous
- Osteospermum monstrosum (Burm.f.) J.C.Manning & Goldblatt, indigenous
- Osteospermum muricatum E.Mey. ex DC. indigenous
- Osteospermum muricatum E.Mey. ex DC. subsp.muricatum, indigenous
- Osteospermum nordenstamii J.C.Manning & Goldblatt, endemic
- Osteospermum norlindhianum J.C.Manning & Goldblatt, endemic
- Osteospermum oppositifolium (Aiton) Norl. indigenous
- Osteospermum pinnatilobatum Norl. endemic
- Osteospermum pinnatum (Thunb.) Norl. accepted as Dimorphotheca pinnata (Thunb.) Harv. indigenous
- Osteospermum pinnatum (Thunb.) Norl. var.breve Norl. accepted as Dimorphotheca pinnata (Thunb.) Harv. var.breve (Norl.) J.C.Manning, indigenous
- Osteospermum pisiferum L. accepted as Osteospermum moniliferum L. subsp.pisiferum (L.) J.C.Manning & Goldblatt, endemic
- Osteospermum pisiferum L. var.canescens DC. accepted as Osteospermum moniliferum L. subsp.canescens (DC.) J.C.Manning & Goldblatt, indigenous
- Osteospermum polycephalum (DC.) Norl. indigenous
- Osteospermum polygaloides L. indigenous
- Osteospermum polygaloides L. var.latifolium Norl. endemic
- Osteospermum polygaloides L. var.polygaloides, endemic
- Osteospermum potbergense A.R.Wood & B.Nord. endemic
- Osteospermum pterigoideum Klatt, endemic
- Osteospermum pulchrum Norl. accepted as Dimorphotheca acutifolia Hutch. present
- Osteospermum pyrifolium Norl. endemic
- Osteospermum rigidum Aiton, indigenous
- Osteospermum rigidum Aiton var.elegans (Bolus) Norl. endemic
- Osteospermum rigidum Aiton var.rigidum, endemic
- Osteospermum rosulatum Norl. endemic
- Osteospermum rotundatum DC. accepted as Osteospermum moniliferum L. subsp.rotundatum (DC.) J.C.Manning & Goldblatt, indigenous
- Osteospermum rotundifolium (DC.) Norl. endemic
- Osteospermum scabrum Thunb. endemic
- Osteospermum scariosum DC. var.integrifolium (Harv.) Norl. endemic
  - Osteospermum scariosum DC. var.scariosum, indigenous
- Osteospermum sinuatum (DC.) Norl. indigenous
  - Osteospermum sinuatum (DC.) Norl. var.lineare (Harv.) Norl. endemic
  - Osteospermum sinuatum (DC.) Norl. var.sinuatum, indigenous
- Osteospermum spathulatum (DC.) Norl. endemic
- Osteospermum spinescens Thunb. indigenous
- Osteospermum spinigerum (Norl.) Norl. endemic
- Osteospermum spinosum L. indigenous
- Osteospermum spinosum L. var.runcinatum P.J.Bergius, endemic
- Osteospermum spinosum L. var.spinosum, endemic
- Osteospermum striatum Burtt Davy, endemic
- Osteospermum subcanescens DC. accepted as Osteospermum incanum Burm.f. subsp.subcanescens (DC.) J.C.Manning & Goldblatt, endemic
- Osteospermum subulatum DC. endemic
- Osteospermum thodei Markotter, indigenous
- Osteospermum thymelaeoides DC. accepted as Phymaspermum thymelaeoides (DC.) Magee & Ruiters, indigenous
- Osteospermum tomentosum (L.f.) Norl. endemic
- Osteospermum triquetrum L.f. endemic
- Osteospermum wallianum Norl. accepted as Dimorphotheca walliana (Norl.) B.Nord. endemic

== Othonna ==
Genus Othonna:

- Othonna abrotanifolia (Harv.) Druce, accepted as Othonna daucifolia J.C.Manning & Goldblatt, endemic
- Othonna alba Compton, accepted as Crassothonna alba (Compton) B.Nord. endemic
- Othonna amplexifolia DC. accepted as Othonna perfoliata (L.f.) Jacq. indigenous
- Othonna arborescens L. endemic
- Othonna arbuscula (Thunb.) Sch.Bip. endemic
- Othonna armiana Van Jaarsv. endemic
- Othonna auriculifolia Licht. ex Less. endemic
- Othonna bulbosa L. endemic
- Othonna burttii B.Nord. indigenous
- Othonna cacalioides L.f. endemic
- Othonna cakilifolia DC. endemic
- Othonna capensis L.H.Bailey, accepted as Crassothonna capensis (L.H.Bailey) B.Nord. endemic
- Othonna carnosa Less. accepted as Crassothonna cacalioides (L.f.) B.Nord. indigenous
- Othonna carnosa Less. var.discoidea Oliv. accepted as Crassothonna discoidea (Oilv. in Hook.) B.Nord. endemic
- Othonna chromochaeta (DC.) Sch.Bip. endemic
- Othonna ciliata L.f. endemic
- Othonna clavifolia Marloth, accepted as Crassothonna clavifolia (Marloth) B.Nord. indigenous
- Othonna coronopifolia L. endemic
- Othonna crassicaulis Compton, accepted as Crassothonna protecta (Dinter) B.Nord. indigenous
- Othonna crassifolia Harv. accepted as Crassothonna capensis (L.H.Bailey) B.Nord. indigenous
- Othonna cremnophila B.Nord. & Van Jaarsv. endemic
- Othonna cuneata DC. endemic
- Othonna cyclophylla Merxm. indigenous
- Othonna cylindrica (Lam.) DC. accepted as Crassothonna cylindrica (Lam.) B.Nord. indigenous
- Othonna daucifolia J.C.Manning & Goldblatt, endemic
- Othonna dentata L. endemic
- Othonna digitata L. endemic
- Othonna divaricata Hutch. endemic
- Othonna diversifolia (DC.) Sch.Bip. endemic
- Othonna eriocarpa (DC.) Sch.Bip. endemic
- Othonna euphorbioides Hutch. endemic
- Othonna filicaulis Jacq. accepted as Othonna perfoliata (L.f.) Jacq. present
- Othonna floribunda Schltr. accepted as Crassothonna floribunda (Schltr.) B.Nord. endemic
- Othonna frutescens L. endemic
- Othonna furcata (Lindl.) Druce, indigenous
- Othonna graveolens O.Hoffm. indigenous
- Othonna gymnodiscus (DC.) Sch.Bip. endemic
- Othonna hallii B.Nord. endemic
- Othonna hederifolia B.Nord. endemic
- Othonna herrei Pillans, endemic
- Othonna heterophylla L.f. endemic
- Othonna humilis Schltr. endemic
- Othonna incisa Harv. accepted as Othonna rosea Harv. endemic
- Othonna intermedia Compton, endemic
- Othonna lasiocarpa (DC.) Sch.Bip. indigenous
- Othonna lepidocaulis Schltr. endemic
- Othonna leptodactyla Harv. endemic
- Othonna lineariifolia (DC.) Sch.Bip. endemic
- Othonna lingua (Less.) Sch.Bip. accepted as Othonna bulbosa L. endemic
- Othonna lobata Schltr. endemic
- Othonna lyrata DC. endemic
- Othonna macrophylla DC. endemic
- Othonna macrosperma DC. endemic
- Othonna membranifolia DC. endemic
- Othonna mucronata Harv. endemic
- Othonna multicaulis Harv. endemic
- Othonna natalensis Sch.Bip. indigenous
- Othonna obtusiloba Harv. endemic
- Othonna oleracea Compton, endemic
- Othonna opima Merxm. accepted as Crassothonna opima (Merxm.) B.Nord. indigenous
- Othonna osteospermoides DC. endemic
- Othonna othonnites (L.) Druce, accepted as Crassothonna capensis (L.H.Bailey) B.Nord.
- Othonna ovalifolia Hutch. endemic
- Othonna pachypoda Hutch. endemic
- Othonna papaveroides Hutch. endemic
- Othonna parviflora P.J.Bergius, endemic
- Othonna patula Schltr. accepted as Crassothonna patula (Schltr.) B.Nord. endemic
- Othonna pavelkae Lavranos, endemic
- Othonna pavonia E.Mey. endemic
- Othonna perfoliata (L.f.) Jacq. indigenous
- Othonna petiolaris DC. endemic
- Othonna pinnata L.f. endemic
- Othonna pinnatilobata Sch.Bip. accepted as Othonna retrofracta Jacq. present
- Othonna pluridentata DC. endemic
- Othonna primulina DC. endemic
- Othonna protecta Dinter, accepted as Crassothonna protecta (Dinter) B.Nord. indigenous
- Othonna pteronioides Harv. endemic
- Othonna purpurascens Harv. endemic
- Othonna pygmaea Compton, endemic
- Othonna quercifolia DC. endemic
- Othonna quinquedentata Thunb. endemic
- Othonna quinqueradiata DC. endemic
- Othonna ramulosa DC. endemic
- Othonna rechingeri B.Nord. accepted as Crassothonna rechingeri (B.Nord.) B.Nord. endemic
- Othonna reticulata DC. endemic
- Othonna retrofracta Jacq. indigenous
- Othonna retrorsa DC. endemic
- Othonna retrorsa DC. var.spektakelensis (Compton) G.D.Rowley, accepted as Othonna retrorsa DC. endemic
- Othonna rhamnoides Sch.Bip. indigenous
- Othonna rosea Harv. endemic
- Othonna rotundifolia DC. endemic
- Othonna rufibarbis Harv. endemic
- Othonna sedifolia DC. accepted as Crassothonna sedifolia (DC.) B.Nord. indigenous
- Othonna sonchifolia DC. endemic
- Othonna sparsiflora (S.Moore) B.Nord. accepted as Crassothonna alba (Compton) B.Nord.
- Othonna spektakelensis Compton, accepted as Othonna retrorsa DC. present
- Othonna spinescens DC. endemic
- Othonna stenophylla Levyns, endemic
- Othonna taraxacoides (DC.) Sch.Bip. endemic
- Othonna tephrosioides Sond. endemic
- Othonna trinervia DC. endemic
- Othonna triplinervia DC. endemic
- Othonna umbelliformis DC. endemic
- Othonna undulosa (DC.) J.C.Manning & Goldblatt, indigenous
- Othonna viminea E.Mey. endemic
- Othonna zeyheri Sond. ex Harv. accepted as Othonna retrorsa DC. endemic

== Oxylaena ==
Genus Oxylaena:

- Oxylaena acicularis (Benth.) Anderb. accepted as Osteospermum scabrum Thunb. endemic

== Parapolydora ==
Genus Parapolydora:

- Parapolydora fastigiata (Oliv. & Hiern) H.Rob. indigenous
- Parapolydora gerrardii (Harv.) H.Rob. Skvarla & V.A.Funk, endemic

== Parthenium ==
Genus Parthenium:

- Parthenium hysterophorus L. not indigenous, invasive

== Pechuel-loeschea ==
Genus Pechuel-loeschea:

- Pechuel-loeschea leubnitziae (Kuntze) O.Hoffm. indigenous

== Pegolettia ==
Genus Pegolettia:

- Pegolettia baccaridifolia Less. endemic
- Pegolettia gariepina Anderb. indigenous
- Pegolettia lanceolata Harv. indigenous
- Pegolettia oxyodonta DC. indigenous
- Pegolettia retrofracta (Thunb.) Kies, indigenous
- Pegolettia senegalensis Cass. indigenous
- Pegolettia tenella DC. accepted as Pseudopegolettia tenella (DC.) H.Rob. Skvarla & V.A.Funk, indigenous
- Pegolettia tenuifolia Bolus, endemic

== Pentanema ==
Genus Pentanema:

- Pentanema indicum (L.) Y.Ling, not indigenous

== Pentatrichia ==
Genus Pentatrichia:

- Pentatrichia alata S.Moore, indigenous
- Pentatrichia avasmontana Merxm. accepted as Pentatrichia rehmii (Merxm.) Merxm. subsp.avasmontana (Merxm.) Klaassen & Kwembeya
- Pentatrichia integra (Compton) Klaassen & N.G.Bergh, endemic
- Pentatrichia kuntzei (O.Hoffm.) Klaassen & N.G.Bergh, endemic
- Pentatrichia petrosa Klatt, indigenous

== Pentzia ==
Genus Pentzia:

- Pentzia argentea Hutch. indigenous
- Pentzia athanasioides S.Moore, accepted as Phymaspermum athanasioides (S.Moore) Kallersjo, indigenous
- Pentzia bolusii Hutch. accepted as Pentzia incana (Thunb.) Kuntze, endemic
- Pentzia calcarea Kies, indigenous
- Pentzia cooperi Harv. indigenous
- Pentzia dentata (L.) Kuntze, endemic
- Pentzia elegans DC. endemic
- Pentzia globosa Less. indigenous
- Pentzia incana (Thunb.) Kuntze, indigenous
- Pentzia lanata Hutch. indigenous
- Pentzia monocephala S.Moore, indigenous
- Pentzia nana Burch. endemic
- Pentzia oppositifolia Magee, indigenous
- Pentzia peduncularis B.Nord. endemic
- Pentzia pinnatifida Oliv. accepted as Phymaspermum pinnatifidum (Oliv.) Kallersjo, indigenous
- Pentzia pinnatifida Oliv. var.chenoleoides Hutch. accepted as Phymaspermum acerosum (DC.) Kallersjo, indigenous
- Pentzia pinnatisecta Hutch. indigenous
- Pentzia punctata Harv. ex Hutch. indigenous
- Pentzia quinquefida (Thunb.) Less. endemic
- Pentzia sphaerocephala DC. indigenous
- Pentzia spinescens Less. indigenous
- Pentzia stellata (P.P.J.Herman) Magee, endemic
- Pentzia stenocephala Thell. accepted as Phymaspermum acerosum (DC.) Kallersjo, indigenous
- Pentzia tortuosa (DC.) Fenzl ex Harv. indigenous
- Pentzia trifida Schltr. ex Magee & J.C.Manning, indigenous
- Pentzia tysonii Thell. accepted as Phymaspermum woodii (Thell.) Kallersjo, indigenous
- Pentzia viridis Kies, endemic
- Pentzia woodii Thell. accepted as Phymaspermum woodii (Thell.) Kallersjo, indigenous

== Perdicium ==
Genus Perdicium:

- Perdicium capense L. endemic
- Perdicium leiocarpum DC. endemic

== Petalacte ==
Genus Petalacte:

- Petalacte coronata (L.) D.Don, endemic
- Petalacte epaleata Hilliard & B.L.Burtt, accepted as Anderbergia epaleata (Hilliard & B.L.Burtt) B.Nord. present
- Petalacte vlokii Hilliard, accepted as Anderbergia vlokii (Hilliard) B.Nord. present

== Peyrousea ==
Genus Peyrousea:

- Peyrousea umbellata (L.f.) Fourc. accepted as Schistostephium umbellatum (L.f.) K.Bremer & Humphries, present

== Phaenocoma ==
Genus Phaenocoma:

- Phaenocoma prolifera (L.) D.Don, endemic

== Phaneroglossa ==
Genus Phaneroglossa:

- Phaneroglossa bolusii (Oliv.) B.Nord. endemic

== Philyrophyllum ==
Genus Philyrophyllum:

- Philyrophyllum schinzii O.Hoffm. indigenous

== Phymaspermum ==
Genus Phymaspermum:

- Phymaspermum acerosum (DC.) Kallersjo, indigenous
- Phymaspermum aciculare (E.Mey. ex Harv.) Benth. & Hook. ex B.D.Jacks. indigenous
- Phymaspermum aphyllum Magee & Ruiters, endemic
- Phymaspermum appressum Bolus, endemic
- Phymaspermum argenteum Brusse, endemic
- Phymaspermum athanasioides (S.Moore) Kallersjo, indigenous
- Phymaspermum bolusii (Hutch.) Kallersjo, accepted as Phymaspermum athanasioides (S.Moore) Kallersjo, indigenous
- Phymaspermum comptonii Magee & Ruiters, indigenous
- Phymaspermum equisetoides Thell. accepted as Phymaspermum erubescens (Hutch.) Kallersjo, indigenous
- Phymaspermum erubescens (Hutch.) Kallersjo, endemic
- Phymaspermum junceum Less. accepted as Phymaspermum leptophyllum (DC.) Benth. & Hook. ex B.D.Jacks. indigenous
- Phymaspermum leptophyllum (DC.) Benth. & Hook. ex B.D.Jacks. endemic
- Phymaspermum montanum (Hutch.) Kallersjo, accepted as Phymaspermum athanasioides (S.Moore) Kallersjo, endemic
- Phymaspermum oppositifolium Magee & Ruiters, endemic
- Phymaspermum parvifolium (DC.) Benth. & Hook. ex B.D.Jacks. endemic
- Phymaspermum peglerae (Hutch.) Kallersjo, endemic
- Phymaspermum pinnatifidum (Oliv.) Kallersjo, endemic
- Phymaspermum pubescens (DC.) Kuntze, accepted as Phymaspermum parvifolium (DC.) Benth. & Hook. ex B.D.Jacks. endemic
- Phymaspermum schroeteri Compton, accepted as Phymaspermum thymelaeoides (DC.) Magee & Ruiters, endemic
- Phymaspermum scoparium (DC.) Kallersjo, endemic
- Phymaspermum thymelaeoides (DC.) Magee & Ruiters, endemic
- Phymaspermum trifidum Magee & Ruiters, endemic
- Phymaspermum villosum (Hilliard) Kallersjo, accepted as Phymaspermum acerosum (DC.) Kallersjo, endemic
- Phymaspermum woodii (Thell.) Kallersjo, indigenous

== Picris ==
Genus Picris:

- Picris echioides L. accepted as Helminthotheca echioides (L.) Holub, not indigenous
- Picris hieracioides L. not indigenous

== Planea ==
Genus Planea:

- Planea schlechteri (L.Bolus) P.O.Karis, endemic

== Platycarpha ==
Genus Platycarpha:

- Platycarpha carlinoides Oliv. & Hiern, accepted as Platycarphella carlinoides (Oliv. & Hiern) V.A.Funk & H.Rob. indigenous
- Platycarpha glomerata (Thunb.) Less. endemic
- Platycarpha parvifolia S.Moore, accepted as Platycarphella parvifolia (S.Moore) V.A.Funk & H.Rob. endemic

== Platycarphella ==
Genus Platycarphella:

- Platycarphella carlinoides (Oliv. & Hiern) V.A.Funk & H.Rob. indigenous
- Platycarphella parvifolia (S.Moore) V.A.Funk & H.Rob. endemic

== Plecostachys ==
Genus Plecostachys:

- Plecostachys polifolia (Thunb.) Hilliard & B.L.Burtt, indigenous
- Plecostachys serpyllifolia (P.J.Bergius) Hilliard & B.L.Burtt, endemic

== Plectreca ==
Genus Plectreca:

- Plectreca corymbosa (Thunb.) Raf. accepted as Gymnanthemum corymbosum (L.f.) H.Rob. indigenous

== Pluchea ==
Genus Pluchea:

- Pluchea bojeri (DC.) Humbert, indigenous
- Pluchea integrifolia Mattf. accepted as Pluchea bojeri (DC.) Humbert
- Pluchea scabrida DC. accepted as Conyza scabrida DC. indigenous

== Poecilolepis ==
Genus Poecilolepis:

- Poecilolepis ficoidea (DC.) Grau, endemic
- Poecilolepis maritima (Bolus) Grau, endemic

== Polyarrhena ==
Genus Polyarrhena:

- Polyarrhena imbricata (DC.) Grau, endemic
- Polyarrhena prostrata Grau, indigenous
- Polyarrhena prostrata Grau subsp.dentata Grau, endemic
- Polyarrhena prostrata Grau subsp.prostrata, endemic
- Polyarrhena reflexa (L.) Cass. indigenous
- Polyarrhena reflexa (L.) Cass. subsp.brachyphylla (Sond. ex Harv.) Grau, endemic
- Polyarrhena reflexa (L.) Cass. subsp.reflexa, endemic
- Polyarrhena stricta Grau, endemic

== Polydora ==
Genus Polydora:

- Polydora angustifolia (Steetz) H.Rob. indigenous
- Polydora poskeana (Vatke & Hildebr.) H.Rob. indigenous
- Polydora steetziana (Oliv. & Hiern) H.Rob. indigenous

== Printzia ==
Genus Printzia:

- Printzia aromatica (L.) Less. endemic
- Printzia auriculata Harv. indigenous
- Printzia huttoni Harv. endemic
- Printzia nutans (Bolus) Leins, indigenous
- Printzia polifolia (L.) Hutch. endemic
- Printzia pyrifolia Less. indigenous

== Pseudoconyza ==
Genus Pseudoconyza:

- Pseudoconyza viscosa (Mill.) D'Arcy, indigenous

== Pseudognaphalium ==
Genus Pseudognaphalium:

- Pseudognaphalium luteoalbum (L.) Hilliard & B.L.Burtt, not indigenous
- Pseudognaphalium oligandrum (DC.) Hilliard & B.L.Burtt, indigenous
- Pseudognaphalium undulatum (L.) Hilliard & B.L.Burtt, indigenous

== Pseudopegolettia ==
Genus Pseudopegolettia:

- Pseudopegolettia tenella (DC.) H.Rob. Skvarla & V.A.Funk, indigenous
- Pseudopegolettia thodei (E.Phillips) H.Rob. Skvarla & V.A.Funk, endemic

== Psiadia ==
Genus Psiadia:

- Psiadia punctulata (DC.) Vatke, indigenous

== Pteronia ==
Genus Pteronia:

- Pteronia acuminata DC. indigenous
- Pteronia acuta Muschl. indigenous
- Pteronia adenocarpa Harv. endemic
- Pteronia ambrariifolia Schltr. endemic
- Pteronia anisata B.Nord. endemic
- Pteronia arcuata Dinter, accepted as Pteronia glauca Thunb.
- Pteronia aspalatha DC. endemic
- Pteronia beckeoides DC. endemic
- Pteronia bolusii E.Phillips, endemic
- Pteronia callosa DC. endemic
- Pteronia camphorata (L.) L. indigenous
- Pteronia camphorata (L.) L. var.armata Harv. endemic
- Pteronia camphorata (L.) L. var.camphorata, endemic
- Pteronia camphorata (L.) L. var.laevigata Harv. endemic
- Pteronia camphorata (L.) L. var.longifolia Harv. endemic
- Pteronia candollei Harv. accepted as Pteronia glauca Thunb. indigenous
- Pteronia centauroides DC. endemic
- Pteronia ciliata Thunb. indigenous
- Pteronia cinerea L.f. endemic
- Pteronia cylindracea DC. indigenous
- Pteronia diosmifolia Brusse, endemic
- Pteronia divaricata (P.J.Bergius) Less. indigenous
- Pteronia elata B.Nord. endemic
- Pteronia elongata Thunb. endemic
- Pteronia empetrifolia DC. endemic
- Pteronia erythrochaeta DC. endemic
- Pteronia fasciculata L.f. endemic
- Pteronia fastigiata Thunb. endemic
- Pteronia flexicaulis L.f. endemic
- Pteronia foleyi Hutch. & E.Phillips, endemic
- Pteronia glabrata DC. accepted as Pteronia glauca Thunb. indigenous
- Pteronia glabrata L.f. indigenous
- Pteronia glauca Thunb. indigenous
- Pteronia glauca Thunb. subsp.arcuata (Dinter) Merxm. accepted as Pteronia glauca Thunb.
- Pteronia glaucescens DC. endemic
- Pteronia glomerata L.f. endemic
- Pteronia gymnocline DC. endemic
- Pteronia heterocarpa DC. endemic
- Pteronia hirsuta L.f. endemic
- Pteronia hutchinsoniana Compton, endemic
- Pteronia incana (Burm.) DC. endemic
- Pteronia inflexa Thunb. ex L.f. indigenous
- Pteronia intermedia Hutch. & E.Phillips, endemic
- Pteronia kingesii Merxm. accepted as Pteronia polygalifolia O.Hoffm. present
- Pteronia latisquama DC. accepted as Pteronia glauca Thunb. indigenous
- Pteronia leptospermoides DC. endemic
- Pteronia leucoclada Turcz. indigenous
- Pteronia leucoloma DC. endemic
- Pteronia lucilioides DC. indigenous
- Pteronia membranacea L.f. endemic
- Pteronia mooreiana Hutch. endemic
- Pteronia mucronata DC. indigenous
- Pteronia oblanceolata E.Phillips, endemic
- Pteronia onobromoides DC. indigenous
- Pteronia oppositifolia L. endemic
- Pteronia ovalifolia DC. endemic
- Pteronia pallens L.f. endemic
- Pteronia paniculata Thunb. indigenous
- Pteronia pillansii Hutch. endemic
- Pteronia punctata E.Phillips, endemic
- Pteronia quinqueflora DC. endemic
- Pteronia scabra Harv. endemic
- Pteronia scariosa L.f. indigenous
- Pteronia sordida N.E.Br. indigenous
- Pteronia staehelinoides DC. endemic
- Pteronia stricta Aiton, indigenous
- Pteronia stricta Aiton var.longifolia E.Phillips, endemic
- Pteronia stricta Aiton var.stricta, endemic
- Pteronia succulenta Thunb. endemic
- Pteronia tenuifolia DC. endemic
- Pteronia teretifolia (Thunb.) Fourc. endemic
- Pteronia thymifolia Muschl. & Dinter, accepted as Pteronia glauca Thunb.
- Pteronia tricephala DC. endemic
- Pteronia uncinata DC. endemic
- Pteronia undulata DC. endemic
- Pteronia unguiculata S.Moore, indigenous
- Pteronia utilis Hutch. endemic
- Pteronia villosa L.f. endemic
- Pteronia viscosa Thunb. indigenous

== Pterothrix ==
Genus Pterothrix:

- Pterothrix flaccida Schltr. ex Hutch. & E.Phillips, accepted as Amphiglossa tomentosa (Thunb.) Harv. present
- Pterothrix perotrichoides (DC.) Harv. accepted as Amphiglossa perotrichoides DC. present
- Pterothrix spinescens DC. accepted as Amphiglossa triflora DC. present
- Pterothrix tecta Brusse, accepted as Amphiglossa tecta (Brusse) Koekemoer, present
- Pterothrix thuja Merxm. accepted as Amphiglossa thuja (Merxm.) Koekemoer

== Pulicaria ==
Genus Pulicaria:

- Pulicaria scabra (Thunb.) Druce, indigenous

== Relhania ==
Genus Relhania:

- Relhania acerosa (DC.) K.Bremer, indigenous
- Relhania calycina (L.f.) L'Her. indigenous
  - Relhania calycina (L.f.) L'Her. subsp. apiculata (DC.) K.Bremer, endemic
  - Relhania calycina (L.f.) L'Her. subsp. calycina, endemic
  - Relhania calycina (L.f.) L'Her. subsp. lanceolata K.Bremer, endemic
- Relhania corymbosa (Bolus) K.Bremer, endemic
- Relhania decussata L'Her. endemic
- Relhania fruticosa (L.) K.Bremer, endemic
- Relhania garnotii (Less.) K.Bremer, endemic
- Relhania pungens L'Her. indigenous
  - Relhania pungens L'Her. subsp. angustifolia (DC.) K.Bremer, endemic
  - Relhania pungens L'Her. subsp. pungens, endemic
  - Relhania pungens L'Her. subsp. trinervis (Thunb.) K.Bremer, endemic
- Relhania relhanioides (Schltr.) K.Bremer, endemic
- Relhania rotundifolia Less. endemic
- Relhania spathulifolia K.Bremer, endemic
- Relhania speciosa (DC.) Harv. endemic
- Relhania tricephala (DC.) K.Bremer, endemic

== Rennera ==
Genus Rennera:

- Rennera stellata P.P.J.Herman, accepted as Pentzia stellata (P.P.J.Herman) Magee, endemic

== Rhynchopsidium ==
Genus Rhynchopsidium:

- Rhynchopsidium pumilum (L.f.) DC. endemic
- Rhynchopsidium sessiliflorum (L.f.) DC. endemic

== Roldana ==
Genus Roldana:

- Roldana petasitis (Sims) H.Rob. & Brettell, not indigenous, cultivated

== Roodebergia ==
Genus Roodebergia:

- Roodebergia kitamurana B.Nord. endemic

== Rosenia ==
Genus Rosenia:

- Rosenia glandulosa Thunb. endemic
- Rosenia humilis (Less.) K.Bremer, indigenous
- Rosenia oppositifolia (DC.) K.Bremer, endemic
- Rosenia spinescens DC. endemic

== Schistostephium ==
Genus Schistostephium:

- Schistostephium artemisiifolium Baker, accepted as Schistostephium crataegifolium (DC.) Fenzl ex Harv.
- Schistostephium crataegifolium (DC.) Fenzl ex Harv. indigenous
- Schistostephium flabelliforme Less. endemic
- Schistostephium griseum (Harv.) Hutch. indigenous
- Schistostephium heptalobum (DC.) Hutch. accepted as Schistostephium crataegifolium (DC.) Fenzl ex Harv.
- Schistostephium heptalobum (DC.) Oliv. & Hiern, accepted as Schistostephium crataegifolium (DC.) Fenzl ex Harv. present
- Schistostephium hippiifolium (DC.) Hutch. endemic
- Schistostephium rotundifolium (DC.) Fenzl ex Harv. indigenous
- Schistostephium scandens Hutch. accepted as Schistostephium crataegifolium (DC.) Fenzl ex Harv. endemic
- Schistostephium umbellatum (L.f.) K.Bremer & Humphries, endemic

== Schkuhria ==
Genus Schkuhria:

- Schkuhria pinnata (Lam.) Kuntze ex Thell. not indigenous

== Senecio ==
Genus Senecio:

- Senecio abbreviatus S.Moore, endemic
- Senecio abruptus Thunb. endemic
- Senecio acaulis (L.) Sch.Bip. accepted as Curio acaulis (L.) P.V.Heath var. acaulis, present
- Senecio achilleifolius DC. indigenous
- Senecio acutifolius DC. endemic
- Senecio addoensis Compton, accepted as Caputia scaposa (DC.) B.Nord. & Pelser var. addoensis (Compton) B.Nord. & Pelser, present
- Senecio adnatus DC. indigenous
- Senecio affinis DC. indigenous
- Senecio agapetes C.Jeffrey, endemic
- Senecio aizoides (DC.) Sch.Bip. accepted as Curio talinoides (DC.) P.V.Heath var. aizoides (DC.) P.V.Heath, present
- Senecio albanensis DC. indigenous
  - Senecio albanensis DC. var. albanensis, indigenous
  - Senecio albanensis DC. var. doroniciflorus (DC.) Harv. indigenous
- Senecio albanopsis Hilliard, endemic
- Senecio albifolius DC. endemic
- Senecio albopunctatus Bolus, endemic
- Senecio alliariifolius O.Hoffm. accepted as Dauresia alliariifolia (O.Hoffm.) B.Nord. & Pelser
- Senecio aloides DC. indigenous
- Senecio amabilis DC. accepted as Senecio agapetes C.Jeffrey, present
- Senecio anapetes C.Jeffrey, indigenous
- Senecio angulatus L.f. endemic
- Senecio angustifolius (Thunb.) Willd. indigenous
- Senecio anomalochrous Hilliard, endemic
- Senecio anthemifolius Harv. endemic
- Senecio apiifolius (DC.) Benth. & Hook.f. ex O.Hoffm. accepted as Mesogramma apiifolium DC. indigenous
- Senecio aquifoliaceus DC. endemic
- Senecio arabidifolius O.Hoffm. indigenous
- Senecio arenarius Thunb. indigenous
- Senecio arniciflorus DC. endemic
- Senecio articulatus (L.) Sch.Bip. endemic
- Senecio asperulus DC. indigenous
- Senecio austromontanus Hilliard, indigenous
- Senecio barbatus DC. indigenous
- Senecio barbertonicus Klatt, indigenous
- Senecio basalticus Hilliard, indigenous
- Senecio baurii Oliv. endemic
- Senecio bellis Harv. endemic
- Senecio bipinnatus (Thunb.) Less. endemic
- Senecio brachypodus DC. indigenous
- Senecio brevidentatus M.D.Hend. endemic
- Senecio brevilorus Hilliard, endemic
- Senecio breviscapus (DC.) Sch.Bip. accepted as Curio cicatricosus (Sch.Bip.) P.V.Heath, present
- Senecio bryoniifolius Harv. indigenous
- Senecio bulbinifolius DC. indigenous
- Senecio bupleuroides DC. indigenous
- Senecio burchellii DC. endemic
- Senecio byrnensis Hilliard, endemic
- Senecio cadiscus B.Nord. & Pelser, endemic
- Senecio cakilefolius DC. accepted as Senecio arenarius Thunb. indigenous
- Senecio caloneotes Hilliard, indigenous
- Senecio canalipes DC. endemic
- Senecio cardaminifolius DC. endemic
- Senecio carnosus Thunb. endemic
- Senecio carroensis DC. endemic
- Senecio cathcartensis O.Hoffm. indigenous
- Senecio caudatus DC. indigenous
- Senecio chrysocoma Meerb. endemic
- Senecio cicatricosus Sch.Bip. accepted as Curio cicatricosus (Sch.Bip.) P.V.Heath, present
- Senecio cinerascens Aiton, indigenous
- Senecio citriceps Hilliard & B.L.Burtt, endemic
- Senecio citriformis G.D.Rowley, accepted as Curio citriformis (G.D.Rowley) P.V.Heath, present
- Senecio coleophyllus Turcz. endemic
- Senecio comptonii J.C.Manning & Goldblatt, indigenous
- Senecio conrathii N.E.Br. indigenous
- Senecio consanguineus DC. indigenous
- Senecio cordifolius L.f. endemic
- Senecio cornu-cervi MacOwan, endemic
- Senecio coronatus (Thunb.) Harv. indigenous
- Senecio corymbiferus DC. accepted as Senecio sarcoides C.Jeffrey, present
- Senecio cotyledonis DC. indigenous
- Senecio crassiusculus DC. endemic
- Senecio crassulifolius (DC.) Sch.Bip. accepted as Curio crassulifolius (DC.) P.V.Heath, present
- Senecio crenatus Thunb. endemic
- Senecio crenulatus DC. endemic
- Senecio crispus Thunb. endemic
- Senecio cristimontanus Hilliard, endemic
- Senecio cryptolanatus Killick, indigenous
- Senecio cymbalariifolius (Thunb.) Less. accepted as Senecio hastifolius (L.f.) Less. present
- Senecio debilis Harv. accepted as Senecio infirmus C.Jeffrey, present
- Senecio decurrens DC. indigenous
- Senecio deltoideus Less. indigenous
- Senecio diffusus Thunb. endemic
- Senecio digitalifolius DC. indigenous
- Senecio diodon DC. endemic
- Senecio discodregeanus Hilliard & B.L.Burtt, indigenous
- Senecio dissidens Fourc. endemic
- Senecio dissimulans Hilliard, indigenous
- Senecio diversifolius (DC.) Harv. accepted as Bolandia pinnatifida (Thunb.) J.C.Manning & Cron, present
  - Senecio diversifolius (DC.) Harv. var. integrifolius Harv. accepted as Bolandia elongata (L.f.) J.C.Manning & Cron, indigenous
- Senecio dracunculoides DC. accepted as Senecio burchellii DC. present
- Senecio dregeanus DC. endemic
- Senecio dumosus Fourc. endemic
- Senecio eenii (S.Moore) Merxm. indigenous
- Senecio elegans L. endemic
- Senecio eminens Compton, indigenous
- Senecio eriobasis DC. accepted as Senecio erosus L.f. endemic
- Senecio erosus L.f. endemic
- Senecio erubescens Aiton, indigenous
  - Senecio erubescens Aiton var. crepidifolius DC. indigenous
  - Senecio erubescens Aiton var. dichotomus DC. indigenous
  - Senecio erubescens Aiton var. erubescens, endemic
  - Senecio erubescens Aiton var. incisus DC. endemic
- Senecio erysimoides DC. endemic
- Senecio esterhuyseniae J.C.Manning & Goldblatt, indigenous
- Senecio euryopoides DC. endemic
- Senecio evelynae Muschl. endemic
- Senecio expansus Harv. accepted as Senecio anapetes C.Jeffrey, present
- Senecio exuberans R.A.Dyer, endemic
- Senecio ficoides (L.) Sch.Bip. accepted as Curio ficoides (L.) P.V.Heath, endemic
- Senecio filifolius Harv. accepted as Senecio mitophyllus C.Jeffrey, present
- Senecio flanaganii E.Phillips, endemic
- Senecio flavus (Decne.) Sch.Bip. indigenous
- Senecio foeniculoides Harv. endemic
- Senecio gariepiensis Cron, indigenous
- Senecio gerrardii Harv. indigenous
- Senecio giessii Merxm. indigenous
- Senecio glaberrimus DC. indigenous
- Senecio glabrifolius DC. accepted as Bolandia glabrifolia (DC.) J.C.Manning & Cron, present
- Senecio glanduloso-lanosus Thell. endemic
- Senecio glanduloso-pilosus Volkens & Muschl. endemic
- Senecio glastifolius L.f. endemic
- Senecio glutinarius DC. endemic
- Senecio glutinosus Thunb. indigenous
- Senecio gramineus Harv. indigenous
- Senecio grandiflorus P.J.Bergius, endemic
- Senecio gregatus Hilliard, indigenous
- Senecio halimifolius L. endemic
- Senecio hallianus G.D.Rowley, accepted as Curio hallianus (G.D.Rowley) P.V.Heath, endemic
- Senecio harveianus MacOwan, indigenous
- Senecio hastatus L. indigenous
- Senecio hastifolius (L.f.) Less. endemic
- Senecio haworthii (Sweet) Sch.Bip. accepted as Caputia tomentosa (Hutch.) B.Nord. & Pelser, endemic
- Senecio haygarthii Hilliard, indigenous
- Senecio hederiformis Cron, endemic
- Senecio heliopsis Hilliard & B.L.Burtt, indigenous
- Senecio helminthioides (Sch.Bip.) Hilliard, indigenous
- Senecio herreanus Dinter, accepted as Curio herreanus (Dinter) P.V.Heath
- Senecio hieracioides DC. indigenous
- Senecio hirsutilobus Hilliard, endemic
- Senecio hirtellus DC. endemic
- Senecio hirtifolius DC. endemic
- Senecio hochstetteri Sch.Bip. ex A.Rich. endemic
- Senecio hollandii Compton, endemic
- Senecio holubii Hutch. & Burtt Davy, endemic
- Senecio humidanus C.Jeffrey, indigenous
- Senecio hygrophilus R.A.Dyer & C.A.Sm. accepted as Senecio humidanus C.Jeffrey, present
- Senecio hypochoerideus DC. indigenous
- Senecio ilicifolius L. endemic
- Senecio inaequidens DC. indigenous
- Senecio incertus DC. endemic
- Senecio incisus Thunb. endemic
- Senecio incomptus DC. endemic
- Senecio infirmus C.Jeffrey, endemic
- Senecio ingeliensis Hilliard, indigenous
- Senecio inornatus DC. indigenous
- Senecio intricatus S.Moore, endemic
- Senecio isatideus DC. indigenous
- Senecio isatidioides E.Phillips & C.A.Sm. indigenous
- Senecio junceus (DC.) Harv. indigenous
- Senecio juniperinus L.f. indigenous
  - Senecio juniperinus L.f. var. epitrachys (DC.) Harv. endemic
  - Senecio juniperinus L.f. var. juniperinus, endemic
- Senecio junodii Hutch. & Burtt Davy, endemic
- Senecio kalingenwae Hilliard & B.L.Burtt, endemic
- Senecio laevigatus Thunb. indigenous
  - Senecio laevigatus Thunb. var. integrifolius Harv. endemic
  - Senecio laevigatus Thunb. var. laevigatus, endemic
- Senecio lanceus Aiton, endemic
- Senecio laticipes Bruyns, endemic
- Senecio latifolius DC. indigenous
- Senecio latissimifolius S.Moore, endemic
- Senecio laxus DC. endemic
- Senecio leptophyllus DC. endemic
- Senecio lessingii Harv. endemic
- Senecio leucoglossus Sond. endemic
- Senecio lineatus (L.f.) DC. endemic
- Senecio linifolius L. indigenous
- Senecio litorosus Fourc. endemic
- Senecio littoreus Thunb. indigenous
  - Senecio littoreus Thunb. var. hispidulus Harv. endemic
  - Senecio littoreus Thunb. var. littoreus, endemic
- Senecio lobelioid DC. accepted as Senecio flavus (Decne.) Sch.Bip. endemic
- Senecio lycopodioides Schltr. endemic
- Senecio lydenburgensis Hutch. & Burtt Davy, indigenous
- Senecio lygodes Hiern, accepted as Senecio inornatus DC. present
- Senecio lyratus L.f. accepted as Senecio variifolius DC. indigenous
- Senecio macowanii Hilliard, endemic
- Senecio macrocephalus DC. indigenous
- Senecio macroglossoides Hilliard, endemic
- Senecio macroglossus DC. indigenous
- Senecio macrospermus DC. indigenous
- Senecio madagascariensis Poir. indigenous
- Senecio marginalis Hilliard, endemic
- Senecio maritimus L. endemic
- Senecio matricariifolius DC. endemic
- Senecio mauricei Hilliard & B.L.Burtt, endemic
- Senecio maydae Merxm. accepted as Senecio albopunctatus Bolus, present
- Senecio mbuluzensis Compton, indigenous
- Senecio medley-woodii Hutch. accepted as Caputia medley-woodii (Hutch.) B.Nord. & Pelser, indigenous
- Senecio microglossus DC. indigenous
- Senecio microspermus DC. endemic
- Senecio mimetes Hutch. & R.A.Dyer, endemic
- Senecio mitophyllus C.Jeffrey, endemic
- Senecio monticola DC. indigenous
- Senecio mooreanus Hutch. & Burtt Davy, endemic
- Senecio mucronatus (Thunb.) Willd. endemic
- Senecio muirii L.Bolus, endemic
- Senecio multibracteatus Harv. endemic
- Senecio multicaulis DC. endemic
- Senecio muricatus Thunb. endemic
- Senecio napifolius MacOwan, endemic
- Senecio natalicola Hilliard, endemic
- Senecio neoviscidulus Soldano, indigenous
- Senecio ngoyanus Hilliard, indigenous
- Senecio niveus (Thunb.) Willd. indigenous
- Senecio odontopterus DC. endemic
- Senecio oederiifolius DC. endemic
- Senecio oliganthus DC. accepted as Senecio pauciflosculosus C.Jeffrey, present
- Senecio othonniflorus DC. indigenous
- Senecio ovoideus (Compton) H.Jacobsen, endemic
- Senecio oxyodontus DC. endemic
- Senecio oxyriifolius DC. indigenous
  - Senecio oxyriifolius DC. subsp. oxyriifolius, indigenous
- Senecio paarlensis DC. endemic
- Senecio paludaffinis Hilliard, indigenous
- Senecio panduratus (Thunb.) Less. accepted as Senecio erosus L.f. endemic
- Senecio panduriformis Hilliard, indigenous
- Senecio paniculatus P.J.Bergius, indigenous
- Senecio parascitus Hilliard, indigenous
- Senecio parentalis Hilliard & B.L.Burtt, endemic
- Senecio parvifolius DC. accepted as Senecio carroensis DC. endemic
- Senecio paucicalyculatus Klatt, accepted as Senecio parentalis Hilliard & B.L.Burtt, indigenous
- Senecio pauciflosculosus C.Jeffrey, endemic
- Senecio pearsonii Hutch. accepted as Senecio asperulus DC. endemic
- Senecio pellucidus DC. endemic
- Senecio penninervius DC. endemic
- Senecio pentactinus Klatt, indigenous
- Senecio persicifolius L. endemic
- Senecio petiolaris DC. accepted as Bolandia pinnatifida (Thunb.) J.C.Manning & Cron, endemic
- Senecio pillansii Levyns, endemic
- Senecio pinguifolius (DC.) Sch.Bip. indigenous
- Senecio pinifolius (L.) Lam. endemic
- Senecio pinnatifidus (P.J.Bergius) Less. endemic
- Senecio pinnulatus Thunb. endemic
- Senecio piptocoma O.Hoffm. indigenous
- Senecio pleistocephalus S.Moore, indigenous
- Senecio polelensis Hilliard, endemic
- Senecio polyanthemoides Sch.Bip. indigenous
- Senecio polyodon DC. indigenous
  - Senecio polyodon DC. var. polyodon, indigenous
  - Senecio polyodon DC. var. subglaber (Kuntze) Hilliard & B.L.Burtt, indigenous
- Senecio pondoensis Van Jaarsv. & A.E.van Wyk, accepted as Curio pondoensis (Van Jaarsv. & A.E.van Wyk) J.C.Manning, indigenous
- Senecio poseideonis Hilliard & B.L.Burtt, endemic
- Senecio praeteritus Killick, endemic
- Senecio prostratus Klatt, endemic
- Senecio pseudolongifolius Sch.Bip. ex J.Calvo, indigenous
- Senecio pterophorus DC. indigenous
- Senecio puberulus DC. endemic
- Senecio pubigerus L. endemic
- Senecio purpureus L. endemic
- Senecio pyramidatus DC. accepted as Caputia pyramidata (DC.) B.Nord. & Pelser, endemic
- Senecio qathlambanus Hilliard, indigenous
- Senecio quinquelobus (Thunb.) DC. endemic
- Senecio quinquenervius Sond. endemic
- Senecio radicans (L.) Sch.Bip. accepted as Curio radicans (L.) P.V.Heath, indigenous
- Senecio rehmannii Bolus, endemic
- Senecio repandus Thunb. endemic
- Senecio reptans Turcz. endemic
- Senecio retortus (DC.) Benth. endemic
- Senecio retrorsus DC. indigenous
- Senecio rhomboideus Harv. indigenous
- Senecio rhyncholaenus DC. indigenous
- Senecio rigidus L. endemic
- Senecio robertiifolius DC. endemic
- Senecio rosmarinifolius L.f. endemic
- Senecio rowleyanus H.Jacobsen, accepted as Curio roeleanus (H.Jacobsen) P.V.Heath, present
- Senecio ruwenzoriensis S.Moore, indigenous
- Senecio sandersonii Harv. endemic
- Senecio saniensis Hilliard & B.L.Burtt, indigenous
- Senecio sarcoides C.Jeffrey, indigenous
- Senecio scapiflorus (L'Her.) C.A.Sm. accepted as Bolandia elongata (L.f.) J.C.Manning & Cron, endemic
- Senecio scaposus DC. accepted as Caputia scaposa (DC.) B.Nord. & Pelser, indigenous
  - Senecio scaposus DC. var. addoensis (Compton) G.D.Rowley, accepted as Caputia scaposa (DC.) B.Nord. & Pelser var. addoensis (Compton) B.Nord. & Pelser, indigenous
  - Senecio scaposus DC. var. scaposus, endemic
- Senecio scitus Hutch. & Burtt Davy, indigenous
- Senecio scoparius Harv. indigenous
- Senecio seminiveus J.M.Wood & M.S.Evans, indigenous
- Senecio serpens G.D.Rowley, accepted as Curio repens (L.) P.V.Heath, endemic
- Senecio serratuloides DC. indigenous
- Senecio serrulatus DC. indigenous
- Senecio serrurioides Turcz. endemic
- Senecio sisymbriifolius DC. indigenous
- Senecio skirrhodon DC. indigenous
- Senecio sociorum Bolus, endemic
- Senecio sophioides DC. endemic
- Senecio speciosissimus J.C.Manning & Goldblatt, endemic
- Senecio speciosus Willd. indigenous
- Senecio spiraeifolius Thunb. endemic
- Senecio striatifolius DC. indigenous
- Senecio subcanescens (DC.) Compton, accepted as Senecio rigidus L. endemic
- Senecio subcoriaceus Schltr. indigenous
- Senecio submontanus Hilliard & B.L.Burtt, endemic
- Senecio subrubriflorus O.Hoffm. indigenous
- Senecio subsinuatus DC. endemic
- Senecio succulentus DC. accepted as Senecio sarcoides C.Jeffrey
- Senecio sulcicalyx Baker, accepted as Curio sulcicalyx (Baker) P.V.Heath
- Senecio surculosus MacOwan, endemic
  - Senecio talinoides (DC.) Sch.Bip. subsp. aizoides (DC.) G.D.Rowley, accepted as Curio talinoides (DC.) P.V.Heath var. aizoides (DC.) P.V.Heath, endemic
- Senecio tamoides DC. indigenous
- Senecio tanacetopsis Hilliard, indigenous
- Senecio telmateius Hilliard, indigenous
- Senecio tenellus DC. endemic
- Senecio thamathuensis Hilliard, endemic
- Senecio thunbergii Harv. endemic
- Senecio tortuosus DC. endemic
- Senecio toxotis C.Jeffrey, accepted as Curio arcuarii (Compton) P.V.Heath, endemic
- Senecio trachylaenus Harv. endemic
- Senecio trachyphyllus Schltr. endemic
- Senecio trifurcatus Klatt, accepted as Senecio triodontiphyllus C.Jeffrey, present
- Senecio triodontiphyllus C.Jeffrey, endemic
- Senecio triplinervius DC. endemic
- Senecio triqueter DC. endemic
- Senecio tropaeolifolius MacOwan, indigenous
- Senecio tuberosus (DC.) Harv. accepted as Senecio incertus DC. indigenous
- Senecio tugelensis J.M.Wood & M.S.Evans, indigenous
- Senecio tysonii MacOwan, endemic
- Senecio ulopterus Thell. endemic
- Senecio umbellatus L. endemic
- Senecio umbricola Cron & B.Nord. indigenous
- Senecio umgeniensis Thell. endemic
- Senecio urophyllus Conrath, endemic
- Senecio variabilis Sch.Bip. endemic
- Senecio variifolius DC. endemic
- Senecio venosus Harv. indigenous
- Senecio verbascifolius Burm.f. endemic
- Senecio vernonioides Sch.Bip. accepted as Senecio erubescens Aiton var. erubescens, indigenous
- Senecio vestitus (Thunb.) P.J.Bergius, endemic
- Senecio villifructus Hilliard, endemic
- Senecio viminalis Bremek. indigenous
- Senecio viscidulus Compton, accepted as Senecio neoviscidulus Soldano, indigenous
- Senecio vitalis N.E.Br. accepted as Senecio talinoides (DC.) Sch.Bip. subsp. cylindricus (A.Berger) G.D.Rowley, endemic
- Senecio vulgaris L. not indigenous, invasive
- Senecio waterbergensis S.Moore, endemic
- Senecio windhoekensis Merxm. indigenous
- Senecio wittebergensis Compton, endemic

== Seneciodes ==
Genus Seneciodes:

- Seneciodes cinereum (L.) Kuntze, accepted as Cyanthillium cinereum (L.) H.Rob. not indigenous

== Seriphium ==
Genus Seriphium:

- Seriphium cinereum L. indigenous
- Seriphium gnaphaloides L. accepted as Elytropappus gnaphaloides (L.) Levyns, indigenous
- Seriphium incanum (Thunb.) Pers. endemic
- Seriphium plumosum L. indigenous
- Seriphium saxatilis (Levyns) Koekemoer, endemic
- Seriphium spirale (Less.) Koekemoer, endemic

== Sigesbeckia ==
Genus Sigesbeckia:

- Sigesbeckia orientalis L. not indigenous

== Silybum ==
Genus Silybum:

- Silybum marianum (L.) Gaertn. not indigenous

== Solanecio ==
Genus Solanecio:

- Solanecio angulatus (Vahl) C.Jeffrey, indigenous

== Solidago ==
Genus Solidago:

- Solidago canadensis L. not indigenous, cultivated

== Soliva ==
Genus Soliva:

- Soliva pterosperma (Juss.) Less. accepted as Soliva sessilis Ruiz & Pav. not indigenous
- Soliva sessilis Ruiz & Pav. not indigenous

== Sonchus ==
Genus Sonchus:

- Sonchus asper (L.) Hill subsp. asper, not indigenous, invasive
- Sonchus asper (L.) Hill subsp. glaucescens (Jord.) Ball, not indigenous
- Sonchus dregeanus DC. indigenous
- Sonchus friesii Boulos, indigenous
  - Sonchus friesii Boulos var. friesii, indigenous
- Sonchus integrifolius Harv. indigenous
  - Sonchus integrifolius Harv. var. integrifolius, indigenous
  - Sonchus integrifolius Harv. var. schlechteri R.E.Fr. indigenous
- Sonchus jacottetianus Thell. indigenous
- Sonchus maritimus L. not indigenous
- Sonchus nanus Sond. ex Harv. indigenous
- Sonchus oleraceus L. not indigenous, invasive
- Sonchus tenerrimus L. indigenous
- Sonchus wilmsii R.E.Fr. indigenous

== Sphaeranthus ==
Genus Sphaeranthus:

- Sphaeranthus humilis O.Hoffm. accepted as Sphaeranthus flexuosus O.Hoffm.
- Sphaeranthus incisus Robyns, accepted as Sphaeranthus peduncularis DC. subsp. peduncularis, present
- Sphaeranthus peduncularis DC. indigenous
  - Sphaeranthus peduncularis DC. subsp. peduncularis, indigenous

== Sphagneticola ==
Genus Sphagneticola:

- Sphagneticola trilobata (L.) Pruski, not indigenous, invasive

== Spilanthes ==
Genus Spilanthes:

- Spilanthes decumbens (Sm.) A.H.Moore, accepted as Acmella decumbens (Sm.) R.K.Jansen, not indigenous
- Spilanthes mauritiana (Pers.) DC. accepted as Acmella caulirhiza Delile, present

== Staehelina ==
Genus Staehelina:

- Staehelina corymbosa L.f. accepted as Gymnanthemum corymbosum (L.f.) H.Rob. indigenous

== Steirodiscus ==
Genus Steirodiscus:

- Steirodiscus capillaceus (Thunb.) Less. endemic
- Steirodiscus gamolepis Bolus ex Schltr. endemic
- Steirodiscus linearilobus DC. endemic
- Steirodiscus schlechteri Bolus ex Schltr. endemic
- Steirodiscus speciosus (Pillans) B.Nord. endemic
- Steirodiscus tagetes (L.) Schltr. endemic

== Stengelia ==
Genus Stengelia:

- Stengelia adoensis Sch.Bip. ex Hochst. accepted as Baccharoides adoensis (Sch.Bip. ex Walp.) H.Rob. indigenous

== Stilpnogyne ==
Genus Stilpnogyne:

- Stilpnogyne bellidioides DC. endemic

== Stoebe ==
Genus Stoebe:

- Stoebe aethiopica L. endemic
- Stoebe alopecuroides (Lam.) Less. endemic
- Stoebe bruniades (Rchb.) Levyns, accepted as Stoebe capitata P.J.Bergius, present
- Stoebe burchellii Levyns, accepted as Seriphium plumosum L. present
- Stoebe capitata P.J.Bergius, endemic
- Stoebe cinerea (L.) Thunb. accepted as Seriphium cinereum L. present
- Stoebe copholepis Sch.Bip. accepted as Stoebe phyllostachya (DC.) Sch.Bip. present
- Stoebe cyathuloides Schltr. endemic
- Stoebe ensorii Compton, accepted as Stoebe phyllostachya (DC.) Sch.Bip. present
- Stoebe fusca (L.) Thunb. endemic
- Stoebe gomphrenoides (Lam.) P.J.Bergius, endemic
- Stoebe humilis Levyns, accepted as Stoebe cyathuloides Schltr. present
- Stoebe incana Thunb. accepted as Seriphium incanum (Thunb.) Pers. present
- Stoebe intricata Levyns, endemic
- Stoebe leucocephala DC. endemic
- Stoebe microphylla DC. endemic
- Stoebe montana Schltr. ex Levyns, endemic
- Stoebe muirii Levyns, endemic
- Stoebe muricata Spreng. ex Sch.Bip. endemic
- Stoebe nervigera (DC.) Sch.Bip. endemic
- Stoebe nivea Thunb. accepted as Dolichothrix ericoides (Lam.) Hilliard & B.L.Burtt, indigenous
- Stoebe phyllostachya (DC.) Sch.Bip. endemic
- Stoebe plumosa (L.) Thunb. accepted as Seriphium plumosum L. present
- Stoebe prostrata L. endemic
- Stoebe rosea Wolley-Dod, endemic
- Stoebe rugulosa Harv. endemic
- Stoebe salteri Levyns, accepted as Stoebe schultzii Levyns, present
- Stoebe saxatilis Levyns, accepted as Seriphium saxatilis (Levyns) Koekemoer, present
- Stoebe scabra L.f. endemic
- Stoebe schultzii Levyns, endemic
- Stoebe sphaerocephala Schltr. accepted as Stoebe cyathuloides Schltr. present
- Stoebe spiralis Less. accepted as Seriphium spirale (Less.) Koekemoer, present
- Stoebe vulgaris Levyns, accepted as Seriphium plumosum L. present

== Stomatanthes ==
Genus Stomatanthes:

- Stomatanthes africanus (Oliv. & Hiern) R.M.King & H.Rob. indigenous

== Symphyotrichum ==
Genus Symphyotrichum:

- Symphyotrichum squamatum (Spreng.) G.L.Nesom, not indigenous
  - Symphyotrichum subulatum (Michx.) G.L.Nesom var. squamatum (Spreng.) S.D.Sundb. accepted as Symphyotrichum squamatum (Spreng.) G.L.Nesom, not indigenous

== Syncarpha ==
Genus Syncarpha:

- Syncarpha affinis (B.Nord.) B.Nord. endemic
- Syncarpha argentea (Thunb.) B.Nord. endemic
- Syncarpha argyropsis (DC.) B.Nord. endemic
- Syncarpha aurea B.Nord. endemic
- Syncarpha canescens (L.) B.Nord. indigenous
  - Syncarpha canescens (L.) B.Nord. subsp. canescens, endemic
  - Syncarpha canescens (L.) B.Nord. subsp. leucolepis (DC.) B.Nord. endemic
  - Syncarpha canescens (L.) B.Nord. subsp. tricolor (DC.) B.Nord. endemic
- Syncarpha chlorochrysum (DC.) B.Nord. endemic
- Syncarpha dregeana (DC.) B.Nord. endemic
- Syncarpha dykei (Bolus) B.Nord. endemic
- Syncarpha eximia (L.) B.Nord. endemic
- Syncarpha ferruginea (Lam.) B.Nord. endemic
- Syncarpha flava (Compton) B.Nord. endemic
- Syncarpha gnaphaloides (L.) DC. endemic
- Syncarpha lepidopodium (Bolus) B.Nord. endemic
- Syncarpha loganiana (Compton) B.Nord. endemic
- Syncarpha marlothii (Schltr.) B.Nord. endemic
- Syncarpha milleflora (L.f.) B.Nord. endemic
- Syncarpha montana (B.Nord.) B.Nord. endemic
- Syncarpha mucronata (P.J.Bergius) B.Nord. endemic
- Syncarpha paniculata (L.) B.Nord. endemic
- Syncarpha recurvata (L.f.) B.Nord. endemic
- Syncarpha sordescens (DC.) B.Nord. endemic
- Syncarpha speciosissima (L.) B.Nord. indigenous
  - Syncarpha speciosissima (L.) B.Nord. subsp. angustifolia (DC.) B.Nord. endemic
  - Syncarpha speciosissima (L.) B.Nord. subsp. speciosissima, endemic
- Syncarpha staehelina (L.) B.Nord. endemic
- Syncarpha striata (Thunb.) B.Nord. endemic
- Syncarpha variegata (P.J.Bergius) B.Nord. endemic
- Syncarpha vestita (L.) B.Nord. endemic
- Syncarpha virgata (P.J.Bergius) B.Nord. endemic
- Syncarpha zeyheri (Sond.) B.Nord. endemic

== Tagetes ==
Genus Tagetes:

- Tagetes erecta L. not indigenous
- Tagetes minuta L. not indigenous, invasive

== Tanacetum ==
Genus Tanacetum:

- Tanacetum cinerariifolium (Trevir.) Sch.Bip. not indigenous
- Tanacetum crithmifolium L. accepted as Hymenolepis crithmifolia (L.) Greuter, M.V.Agab. & Wagenitz, indigenous

== Taraxacum ==
Genus Taraxacum:

- Taraxacum bessarabicum (Hornem.) Hand.-Mazz. not indigenous
- Taraxacum brachyglossum (Dahlst.) Dahlst. not indigenous
- Taraxacum breviscapum A.J.Richards, not indigenous
- Taraxacum brunneum Soest, not indigenous
- Taraxacum cophocentrum Dahlst. not indigenous
- Taraxacum dilatatum H.Lindb. not indigenous
- Taraxacum disseminatum G.E.Haglund, not indigenous
- Taraxacum duplidens H.Lindb. not indigenous
- Taraxacum ekmanii Dahlst. not indigenous
- Taraxacum hamatiforme Dahlst. not indigenous
- Taraxacum marklundii Palmgr. not indigenous
- Taraxacum officinale Weber, not indigenous
- Taraxacum parvilobum Dahlst. not indigenous
- Taraxacum privum Dahlst. not indigenous
- Taraxacum serotinum (Waldst. & Kit.) Poir. not indigenous

== Tarchonanthus ==
Genus Tarchonanthus:

- Tarchonanthus camphoratus L. indigenous
- Tarchonanthus littoralis P.P.J.Herman, endemic
- Tarchonanthus minor Less. indigenous
- Tarchonanthus obovatus DC. endemic
- Tarchonanthus parvicapitulatus P.P.J.Herman, indigenous
- Tarchonanthus trilobus DC. indigenous
  - Tarchonanthus trilobus DC. var. galpinii (Hutch. & E.Phillips) Paiva, indigenous
  - Tarchonanthus trilobus DC. var. trilobus, endemic

== Tenrhynea ==
Genus Tenrhynea:

- Tenrhynea phylicifolia (DC.) Hilliard & B.L.Burtt, indigenous

== Thaminophyllum ==
Genus Thaminophyllum:

- Thaminophyllum latifolium Bond, endemic
- Thaminophyllum multiflorum Harv. endemic
- Thaminophyllum mundii Harv. endemic

== Tithonia ==
Genus Tithonia:

- Tithonia diversifolia (Hemsl.) A.Gray, not indigenous, invasive
- Tithonia rotundifolia (Mill.) S.F.Blake, not indigenous, invasive
- Tithonia tubaeformis (Jacq.) Cass. not indigenous

== Tolpis ==
Genus Tolpis:

- Tolpis capensis (L.) Sch.Bip. indigenous

== Tragopogon ==
Genus Tragopogon:

- Tragopogon dubius Scop. not indigenous
- Tragopogon hybridus L. not indigenous
- Tragopogon porrifolius L. not indigenous

== Trichogyne ==
Genus Trichogyne:

- Trichogyne ambigua (L.) Druce, accepted as Ifloga ambigua (L.) Druce, endemic
- Trichogyne candida (Hilliard) Anderb. accepted as Ifloga candida Hilliard, endemic
- Trichogyne decumbens (Thunb.) Less. accepted as Ifloga decumbens (Thunb.) Schltr. indigenous
- Trichogyne lerouxiae Beyers, accepted as Ifloga lerouxiae (Beyers) N.G.Bergh, endemic
- Trichogyne paronychioides DC. accepted as Ifloga paronychioides (DC.) Fenzl, present
- Trichogyne pilulifera (Schltr.) Anderb. accepted as Ifloga pilulifera Schltr. endemic
- Trichogyne polycnemoides (Fenzl) Anderb. accepted as Ifloga polycnemoides Fenzl, endemic
- Trichogyne repens (L.) Anderb. accepted as Ifloga repens (L.) Hilliard & B.L.Burtt, endemic
- Trichogyne verticillata (L.f.) Less. accepted as Ifloga verticillata (L.f.) Fenzl, endemic

== Tridax ==
Genus Tridax:

- Tridax procumbens L. not indigenous

== Tripteris ==
Genus Tripteris:

- Tripteris aghillana DC. accepted as Osteospermum scariosum DC. indigenous
  - Tripteris aghillana DC. var. aghillana, accepted as Osteospermum scariosum DC. var. scariosum, indigenous
  - Tripteris aghillana DC. var. integrifolia Harv. accepted as Osteospermum scariosum DC. var. integrifolium (Harv.) Norl. endemic
- Tripteris amplectens Harv. accepted as Osteospermum amplectens (Harv.) Norl. endemic
- Tripteris amplexicaulis (Thunb.) Less. accepted as Osteospermum connatum DC. endemic
- Tripteris auriculata S.Moore, accepted as Osteospermum auriculatum (S.Moore) Norl. endemic
- Tripteris breviradiata (Norl.) B.Nord. accepted as Osteospermum breviradiatum Norl. indigenous
- Tripteris calcicola J.C.Manning & Goldblatt, accepted as Osteospermum calcicola (J.C.Manning & Snijman) J.C.Manning & Goldblatt, endemic
- Tripteris clandestina Less. accepted as Osteospermum monstrosum (Burm.f.) J.C.Manning & Goldblatt, indigenous
- Tripteris crassifolia O.Hoffm. accepted as Osteospermum crassifolium (O.Hoffm.) Norl. indigenous
- Tripteris dentata (Burm.f.) Harv. accepted as Osteospermum dentatum Burm.f. endemic
- Tripteris glabra (N.E.Br.) C.A.Sm. accepted as Osteospermum glabrum N.E.Br. endemic
- Tripteris hyoseroides DC. accepted as Osteospermum hyoseroides (DC.) Norl. endemic
- Tripteris linearis Harv. accepted as Osteospermum sinuatum (DC.) Norl. var. lineare (Harv.) Norl. endemic
- Tripteris microcarpa Harv. accepted as Osteospermum microcarpum (Harv.) Norl. indigenous
- Tripteris oppositifolia (Aiton) B.Nord. accepted as Osteospermum oppositifolium (Aiton) Norl. indigenous
- Tripteris pinnatilobata (Norl.) B.Nord. accepted as Osteospermum pinnatilobatum Norl. endemic
- Tripteris polycephala DC. accepted as Osteospermum polycephalum (DC.) Norl. indigenous
- Tripteris rosulata (Norl.) B.Nord. accepted as Osteospermum rosulatum Norl. endemic
- Tripteris sinuata DC. accepted as Osteospermum sinuatum (DC.) Norl. indigenous
  - Tripteris sinuata DC. var. linearis (Harv.) B.Nord. accepted as Osteospermum sinuatum (DC.) Norl. var. lineare (Harv.) Norl. endemic
- Tripteris spathulata DC. accepted as Osteospermum spathulatum (DC.) Norl. endemic
- Tripteris spinigera Norl. accepted as Osteospermum spinigerum (Norl.) Norl. endemic
- Tripteris tomentosa (L.f.) Less. accepted as Osteospermum tomentosum (L.f.) Norl. endemic

== Troglophyton ==
Genus Troglophyton:

- Troglophyton acocksianum Hilliard, endemic
- Troglophyton capillaceum (Thunb.) Hilliard & B.L.Burtt, indigenous
  - Troglophyton capillaceum (Thunb.) Hilliard & B.L.Burtt subsp. capillaceum, indigenous
  - Troglophyton capillaceum (Thunb.) Hilliard & B.L.Burtt subsp. diffusum (DC.) Hilliard, indigenous
- Troglophyton elsiae Hilliard, endemic
- Troglophyton leptomerum Hilliard, endemic
- Troglophyton parvulum (Harv.) Hilliard & B.L.Burtt, indigenous
- Troglophyton tenellum Hilliard, endemic

== Urospermum ==
Genus Urospermum:

- Urospermum picroides (L.) Scop. ex F.W.Schmidt, not indigenous

== Ursinia ==
Genus Ursinia:

- Ursinia abrotanifolia (R.Br.) Spreng. endemic
- Ursinia alpina N.E.Br. endemic
- Ursinia anethoides (DC.) N.E.Br. endemic
- Ursinia anthemoides (L.) Poir. indigenous
  - Ursinia anthemoides (L.) Poir. subsp. anthemoides, endemic
  - Ursinia anthemoides (L.) Poir. subsp. versicolor (DC.) Prassler, indigenous
- Ursinia arida Magee & Mucina, endemic
- Ursinia brachyloba (Kunze) N.E.Br. endemic
- Ursinia cakilefolia DC. endemic
- Ursinia caledonica (E.Phillips) Prassler, endemic
- Ursinia calenduliflora (DC.) N.E.Br. endemic
- Ursinia chrysanthemoides (Less.) Harv. endemic
- Ursinia coronopifolia (Less.) N.E.Br. endemic
- Ursinia dentata (L.) Poir. endemic
- Ursinia discolor (Less.) N.E.Br. endemic
- Ursinia dregeana (DC.) N.E.Br. endemic
- Ursinia eckloniana (Sond.) N.E.Br. endemic
- Ursinia filipes (E.Mey. ex DC.) N.E.Br. endemic
- Ursinia frutescens Dinter, indigenous
- Ursinia glandulosa Magee & Boatwr. endemic
- Ursinia heterodonta (DC.) N.E.Br. endemic
- Ursinia hispida (DC.) N.E.Br. endemic
- Ursinia kamiesbergensis Magee & Mucina, endemic
- Ursinia laciniata Magee & Mucina, endemic
- Ursinia macropoda (DC.) N.E.Br. endemic
- Ursinia merxmuelleri Prassler, endemic
- Ursinia montana DC. indigenous
  - Ursinia montana DC. subsp. apiculata (DC.) Prassler, endemic
  - Ursinia montana DC. subsp. montana, indigenous
- Ursinia nana DC. indigenous
  - Ursinia nana DC. subsp. leptophylla Prassler, indigenous
  - Ursinia nana DC. subsp. nana, indigenous
- Ursinia nudicaulis (Thunb.) N.E.Br. endemic
- Ursinia oreogena Schltr. ex Prassler, endemic
- Ursinia paleacea (L.) Moench, endemic
- Ursinia pilifera (P.J.Bergius) Poir. endemic
- Ursinia pinnata (Thunb.) Prassler, endemic
- Ursinia punctata (Thunb.) N.E.Br. endemic
- Ursinia pygmaea DC. endemic
- Ursinia quinquepartita (DC.) N.E.Br. endemic
- Ursinia rigidula (DC.) N.E.Br. endemic
- Ursinia saxatilis N.E.Br. indigenous
- Ursinia scariosa (Aiton) Poir. indigenous
  - Ursinia scariosa (Aiton) Poir. subsp. scariosa, endemic
  - Ursinia scariosa (Aiton) Poir. subsp. subhirsuta (DC.) Prassler, endemic
- Ursinia sericea (Thunb.) N.E.Br. endemic
- Ursinia serrata (L.f.) Poir. endemic
- Ursinia speciosa DC. indigenous
- Ursinia subflosculosa (DC.) Prassler, endemic
- Ursinia tenuifolia (L.) Poir. indigenous
  - Ursinia tenuifolia (L.) Poir. subsp. ciliaris (DC.) Prassler, endemic
  - Ursinia tenuifolia (L.) Poir. subsp. tenuifolia, endemic
- Ursinia tenuiloba DC. indigenous
- Ursinia trifida (Thunb.) N.E.Br. indigenous
  - Ursinia trifida (Thunb.) N.E.Br. forma calva Prassler, endemic
  - Ursinia trifida (Thunb.) N.E.Br. forma trifida, endemic

== Vellereophyton ==
Genus Vellereophyton:

- Vellereophyton dealbatum (Thunb.) Hilliard & B.L.Burtt, indigenous
- Vellereophyton felinum Hilliard, endemic
- Vellereophyton gracillimum Hilliard, endemic
- Vellereophyton lasianthum (Schltr. & Moeser) Hilliard, endemic
- Vellereophyton niveum Hilliard, endemic
- Vellereophyton pulvinatum Hilliard, endemic
- Vellereophyton vellereum (R.A.Dyer) Hilliard, endemic

== Verbesina ==
Genus Verbesina:

- Verbesina encelioides (Cav.) Benth. & Hook.f. ex A.Gray subsp. encelioides, not indigenous
  - Verbesina encelioides (Cav.) Benth. & Hook.f. ex A.Gray subsp. exauriculata (B.L.Rob. & Greenm.), not indigenous
  - Verbesina encelioides (Cav.) Benth. & Hook.f. ex A.Gray var. exauriculata B.L.Rob. & Greenm. accepted as Verbesina encelioides (Cav.) Benth. & Hook.f. ex A.Gray subsp. exauriculata (B.L.Rob. & Greenm.), not indigenous

== Vernonella ==
Genus Vernonella:

- Vernonella africana Sond. endemic

== Vernonia ==
Genus Vernonia:

- Vernonia acuminatissima S.Moore, accepted as Vernoniastrum acuminatissimum (S.Moore) H.Rob. Skvarla & V.A.Funk, indigenous
- Vernonia adoensis Sch.Bip. ex Walp. accepted as Baccharoides adoensis (Sch.Bip. ex Walp.) H.Rob. indigenous
  - Vernonia adoensis Sch.Bip. ex Walp. var. kotschyana (Sch.Bip. ex Walp.) G.V.Pope, accepted as Baccharoides adoensis (Sch.Bip. ex Walp.) H.Rob. indigenous
  - Vernonia adoensis Sch.Bip. ex Walp. var. mossambiquensis (Steetz) G.V.Pope, accepted as Baccharoides adoensis (Sch.Bip. ex Walp.) H.Rob. indigenous
- Vernonia africana (Sond.) Druce, accepted as Vernonella africana Sond. endemic
- Vernonia amygdalina Delile, accepted as Gymnanthemum amygdalinum (Delile) Sch.Bip. ex Walp. indigenous
- Vernonia angulifolia DC. accepted as Distephanus angulifolius (DC.) H.Rob. & B.Kahn, indigenous
- Vernonia anisochaetoides Sond. accepted as Distephanus anisochaetoides (Sond.) H.Rob. & B.Kahn, indigenous
- Vernonia aristata (DC.) Sch.Bip. accepted as Hilliardiella aristata (DC.) H.Rob. indigenous
- Vernonia aurantiaca (O.Hoffm.) N.E.Br. accepted as Distephanus divaricatus (Steetz) H.Rob. & B.Kahn, indigenous
- Vernonia bainesii Oliv. & Hiern sens.lat. accepted as Polydora bainesii (Oliv. & Hiern) H.Rob. indigenous
- Vernonia bequaertii De Wild. accepted as Baccharoides adoensis (Sch.Bip. ex Walp.) H.Rob.
- Vernonia capensis (Houtt.) Druce, accepted as Hilliardiella capensis (Houtt.) H.Rob. Skvarla & V.A.Funk, indigenous
- Vernonia centaureoides Klatt, accepted as Oocephala centaureoides (Klatt) H.Rob. & Skvarla, indigenous
- Vernonia cinerascens Sch.Bip. accepted as Orbivestus cinerascens (Sch.Bip.) H.Rob. indigenous
- Vernonia cinerea (L.) Less. accepted as Cyanthillium cinereum (L.) H.Rob. not indigenous
- Vernonia collina Schltr. accepted as Pseudopegolettia thodei (E.Phillips) H.Rob. Skvarla & V.A.Funk, indigenous
- Vernonia colorata (Willd.) Drake, accepted as Gymnanthemum coloratum (Willd.) H.Rob. & B.Kahn, indigenous
- Vernonia corymbosa (L.f.) Less. accepted as Gymnanthemum corymbosum (L.f.) H.Rob. indigenous
  - Vernonia corymbosa (L.f.) Less. var. mespiloides DC. accepted as Gymnanthemum corymbosum (L.f.) H.Rob. indigenous
  - Vernonia corymbosa (L.f.) Less. var. pleiantha O.Hoffm. accepted as Gymnanthemum corymbosum (L.f.) H.Rob. indigenous
- Vernonia crataegifolia Hutch. accepted as Gymnanthemum crataegifolium (Hutch.) H.Rob. indigenous
- Vernonia dregeana Sch.Bip. accepted as Hilliardiella nudicaulis (DC.) H.Rob. endemic
- Vernonia erinacea Wild, accepted as Polydora angustifolia (Steetz) H.Rob. indigenous
- Vernonia fastigiata Oliv. & Hiern, accepted as Parapolydora fastigiata (Oliv. & Hiern) H.Rob. indigenous
- Vernonia flanaganii (E.Phillips) Hilliard, accepted as Hilliardiella flanaganii (E.Phillips) H.Rob. Skvarla & V.A.Funk, endemic
- Vernonia fulviseta S.Moore, accepted as Baccharoides adoensis (Sch.Bip. ex Walp.) H.Rob.
- Vernonia galpinii Klatt, accepted as Pseudopegolettia tenella (DC.) H.Rob. Skvarla & V.A.Funk, indigenous
- Vernonia gerberiformis Oliv. & Hiern subsp. macrocyanus (O.Hoffm.) C.Jeffrey, accepted as Linzia gerberiformis (Oliv. & Hiern) H.Rob. indigenous
  - Vernonia gerberiformis Oliv. & Hiern var. hockii (De Wild. & Muschl.) G.V.Pope, accepted as Linzia gerberiformis (Oliv. & Hiern) H.Rob. indigenous
- Vernonia gerrardii Harv. accepted as Parapolydora gerrardii (Harv.) H.Rob. Skvarla & V.A.Funk, endemic
- Vernonia glabra (Steetz) Vatke, accepted as Linzia glabra Steetz, indigenous
  - Vernonia glabra (Steetz) Vatke var. laxa (Steetz) Brenan, accepted as Linzia glabra Steetz, indigenous
- Vernonia grantii Oliv. accepted as Baccharoides adoensis (Sch.Bip. ex Walp.) H.Rob.
- Vernonia hirsuta (DC.) Sch.Bip. ex Walp. accepted as Hilliardiella hirsuta (DC.) H.Rob. indigenous
  - Vernonia hirsuta (DC.) Sch.Bip. ex Walp. var. flanaganii E.Phillips, accepted as Hilliardiella flanaganii (E.Phillips) H.Rob. Skvarla & V.A.Funk, indigenous
  - Vernonia hirsuta (DC.) Sch.Bip. ex Walp. var. obtusifolia Harv. accepted as Hilliardiella hirsuta (DC.) H.Rob. indigenous
- Vernonia hockii De Wild. & Muschl. accepted as Linzia gerberiformis (Oliv. & Hiern) H.Rob. indigenous
- Vernonia inhacensis G.V.Pope, accepted as Distephanus inhacensis (G.V.Pope) Boon & Glen, indigenous
- Vernonia integra S.Moore, accepted as Baccharoides adoensis (Sch.Bip. ex Walp.) H.Rob.
- Vernonia kotschyana Sch.Bip. ex Walp. accepted as Baccharoides adoensis (Sch.Bip. ex Walp.) H.Rob. indigenous
- Vernonia kraussii Sch.Bip. ex Walp. accepted as Hilliardiella elaeagnoides (DC.) Swelank. & J.C.Manning, indigenous
  - Vernonia kraussii Sch.Bip. ex Walp. var. oligocephala (DC.) H.Rob. accepted as Hilliardiella elaeagnoides (DC.) Swelank. & J.C.Manning, indigenous
- Vernonia latisquama Mattf. accepted as Baccharoides adoensis (Sch.Bip. ex Walp.) H.Rob.
- Vernonia leptolepis Baker, accepted as Baccharoides adoensis (Sch.Bip. ex Walp.) H.Rob.
- Vernonia macrocephala A.Rich. accepted as Baccharoides adoensis (Sch.Bip. ex Walp.) H.Rob.
- Vernonia macrocyanus O.Hoffm. accepted as Linzia gerberiformis (Oliv. & Hiern) H.Rob. indigenous
- Vernonia meiostephana C.Jeffrey, accepted as Cyanthillium vernonioides (Muschl.) H.Rob. indigenous
- Vernonia melleri Oliv. & Hiern sens.lat. accepted as Linzia melleri (Oliv. & Hiern) H.Rob. sens.lat.
- Vernonia mespilifolia Less. accepted as Gymnanthemum capensis (A.Spreng.) J.C.Manning & Swelank. indigenous
  - Vernonia mespilifolia Less. var. subcanescens DC. accepted as Gymnanthemum crataegifolium (Hutch.) H.Rob. indigenous
- Vernonia misera Oliv. & Hiern, accepted as Erlangea misera (Oliv. & Hiern) S.Moore, indigenous
- Vernonia monocephala Harv. accepted as Pseudopegolettia tenella (DC.) H.Rob. Skvarla & V.A.Funk, indigenous
- Vernonia mossambiquensis (Steetz) Oliv. & Hiern, accepted as Baccharoides adoensis (Sch.Bip. ex Walp.) H.Rob. indigenous
- Vernonia myriantha Hook.f. accepted as Gymnanthemum myrianthum (Hook.f.) H.Rob. indigenous
- Vernonia natalensis Sch.Bip. ex Walp. accepted as Hilliardiella aristata (DC.) H.Rob. indigenous
- Vernonia neocorymbosa Hilliard, accepted as Gymnanthemum corymbosum (L.f.) H.Rob. indigenous
- Vernonia nestor S.Moore, accepted as Vernoniastrum nestor (S.Moore) H.Rob. indigenous
- Vernonia obionifolia O.Hoffm. accepted as Namibithamnus obionifolius (O.Hoffm.) H.Rob. Skvarla & V.A.Funk, indigenous
- Vernonia oligocephala (DC.) Sch.Bip. ex Walp. accepted as Hilliardiella elaeagnoides (DC.) Swelank. & J.C.Manning, indigenous
- Vernonia pinifolia (Lam.) Less. accepted as Hilliardiella capensis (Houtt.) H.Rob. Skvarla & V.A.Funk, indigenous
  - Vernonia pinifolia (Lam.) Less. var. glabrata Harv. accepted as Hilliardiella capensis (Houtt.) H.Rob. Skvarla & V.A.Funk, indigenous
- Vernonia polymorpha Vatke var. accedens Vatke, accepted as Baccharoides adoensis (Sch.Bip. ex Walp.) H.Rob.
  - Vernonia polymorpha Vatke var. adoensis (Sch.Bip. ex Walp.) Vatke, accepted as Baccharoides adoensis (Sch.Bip. ex Walp.) H.Rob. indigenous
  - Vernonia polymorpha Vatke var. ambigua Vatke, accepted as Baccharoides adoensis (Sch.Bip. ex Walp.) H.Rob.
- Vernonia poskeana Vatke & Hildebr. subsp. botswanica G.V.Pope, accepted as Polydora poskeana (Vatke & Hildebr.) H.Rob. indigenous
- Vernonia pseudocorymbosa Thell. accepted as Gymnanthemum crataegifolium (Hutch.) H.Rob. indigenous
- Vernonia pseudonatalensis Wild, accepted as Hilliardiella aristata (DC.) H.Rob. indigenous
- Vernonia rhodanthoidea Muschl. accepted as Polydora angustifolia (Steetz) H.Rob. indigenous
- Vernonia rogersii S.Moore, accepted as Vernoniastrum acuminatissimum (S.Moore) H.Rob. Skvarla & V.A.Funk, indigenous
- Vernonia schlechteri O.Hoffm. accepted as Oocephala centaureoides (Klatt) H.Rob. & Skvarla, indigenous
- Vernonia shirensis Oliv. & Hiern, accepted as Baccharoides adoensis (Sch.Bip. ex Walp.) H.Rob.
- Vernonia staehelinoides Harv. accepted as Oocephala staehelinoides (Harv.) H.Rob. & Skvarla, endemic
- Vernonia steetziana Oliv. & Hiern, accepted as Polydora steetziana (Oliv. & Hiern) H.Rob. indigenous
- Vernonia stenostegia (Stapf) Hutch. & Dalziel, accepted as Baccharoides adoensis (Sch.Bip. ex Walp.) H.Rob.
- Vernonia stipulacea Klatt, accepted as Gymnanthemum myrianthum (Hook.f.) H.Rob. indigenous
- Vernonia sutherlandii Harv. accepted as Hilliardiella sutherlandii (Harv.) H.Rob. indigenous
- Vernonia theophrastifolia Schweinf. ex Oliv. & Hiern, accepted as Gymnanthemum theophrastifolium (Schweinf. ex Oliv. & Hiern) H.Rob. indigenous
- Vernonia thodei E.Phillips, accepted as Pseudopegolettia thodei (E.Phillips) H.Rob. Skvarla & V.A.Funk, endemic
- Vernonia tigna Klatt, accepted as Gymnanthemum corymbosum (L.f.) H.Rob. indigenous
- Vernonia tigrensis Oliv. & Hiern, accepted as Baccharoides adoensis (Sch.Bip. ex Walp.) H.Rob.
- Vernonia transvaalensis Hutch. accepted as Cyanthillium wollastonii (S.Moore) H.Rob. Skvarla & V.A.Funk, indigenous
- Vernonia triflora Bremek. accepted as Gymnanthemum triflorum (Bremek.) H.Rob. endemic
- Vernonia umbratica Oberm. accepted as Cyanthillium wollastonii (S.Moore) H.Rob. Skvarla & V.A.Funk, indigenous
- Vernonia vernonella Harv. accepted as Vernonella africana Sond. indigenous
- Vernonia whyteana Britten, accepted as Baccharoides adoensis (Sch.Bip. ex Walp.) H.Rob.
- Vernonia wollastonii S.Moore, accepted as Cyanthillium wollastonii (S.Moore) H.Rob. Skvarla & V.A.Funk, indigenous
- Vernonia woodii O.Hoffm. accepted as Baccharoides adoensis (Sch.Bip. ex Walp.) H.Rob.

== Vernoniastrum ==
Genus Vernoniastrum:

- Vernoniastrum acuminatissimum (S.Moore) H.Rob. Skvarla & V.A.Funk, indigenous
- Vernoniastrum nestor (S.Moore) H.Rob. indigenous

== Vicoa ==
Genus Vicoa:

- Vicoa auriculata Cass. was accepted as Pentanema indicum (L.) Y.Ling, not indigenous

== Waitzia ==
Genus Waitzia:

- Waitzia refracta (Jacq.) Heynh. accepted as Freesia refracta (Jacq.) Klatt
- Waitzia xanthospila (DC.) Heynh. accepted as Freesia caryophyllacea (Burm.f.) N.E.Br.

== Webbia ==
Genus Webbia:

- Webbia aristata DC. accepted as Hilliardiella aristata (DC.) H.Rob. indigenous
- Webbia elaeagnoides DC. accepted as Hilliardiella elaeagnoides (DC.) Swelank. & J.C.Manning, indigenous
- Webbia hirsuta DC. accepted as Hilliardiella hirsuta (DC.) H.Rob. indigenous
- Webbia kraussii Sch.Bip. accepted as Conyza obscura DC. indigenous
- Webbia nudicaulis DC. accepted as Hilliardiella nudicaulis (DC.) H.Rob. endemic
- Webbia oligocephala DC. accepted as Hilliardiella elaeagnoides (DC.) Swelank. & J.C.Manning, indigenous
- Webbia pinifolia (Lam.) DC. accepted as Hilliardiella capensis (Houtt.) H.Rob. Skvarla & V.A.Funk, indigenous

== Wedelia ==
Genus Wedelia:

- Wedelia glauca (Ortega) Hoffm. ex Hicken, not indigenous

== Wollastonia ==
Genus Wollastonia:

- Wollastonia biflora (L.) DC., indigenous

== Xanthium ==
Genus Xanthium:

- Xanthium spinosum L. not indigenous, invasive
- Xanthium strumarium L. not indigenous, invasive

== Xenismia ==
Genus Xenismia:

- Xenismia acanthosperma DC. accepted as Osteospermum acanthospermum (DC.) Norl. indigenous

== Xeranthemum ==
Genus Xeranthemum:

- Xeranthemum ericoides Lam. accepted as Dolichothrix ericoides (Lam.) Hilliard & B.L.Burtt, indigenous

== Youngia ==
Genus Youngia:

- Youngia japonica (L.) DC. not indigenous

== Zinnia ==
Genus Zinnia:

- Zinnia peruviana (L.) L. not indigenous

== Zoutpansbergia ==
Genus Zoutpansbergia:

- Zoutpansbergia caerulea Hutch. endemic

== Zyrphelis ==
Genus Zyrphelis:

- Zyrphelis burchellii (DC.) Kuntze, accepted as Mairia burchellii DC. endemic
- Zyrphelis capensis Zinnecker, indigenous
- Zyrphelis decumbens (Schltr.) G.L.Nesom, endemic
- Zyrphelis ecklonis (DC.) Kuntze, indigenous
  - Zyrphelis ecklonis (DC.) Kuntze subsp. ecklonis, endemic
- Zyrphelis foliosa (Harv.) Kuntze, endemic
- Zyrphelis glabra Zinnecker, indigenous
- Zyrphelis glandulosa Zinnecker, indigenous
- Zyrphelis grauii Zinnecker, indigenous
- Zyrphelis hirsuta (DC.) Kuntze, accepted as Mairia purpurata (L.) Goldblatt & J.C.Manning, indigenous
- Zyrphelis lasiocarpa (DC.) Kuntze, endemic
- Zyrphelis macrocarpa Zinnecker, indigenous
- Zyrphelis microcephala (Less.) Nees, indigenous
  - Zyrphelis microcephala (Less.) Nees subsp. microcephala, endemic
- Zyrphelis montana (Schltr.) G.L.Nesom, endemic
- Zyrphelis nervosa Zinnecker, indigenous
- Zyrphelis perezioides (Less.) G.L.Nesom, accepted as Zyrphelis pilosella (Thunb.) Kuntze, endemic
- Zyrphelis spathulata Zinnecker, indigenous
- Zyrphelis taxifolia (L.) Nees, endemic
