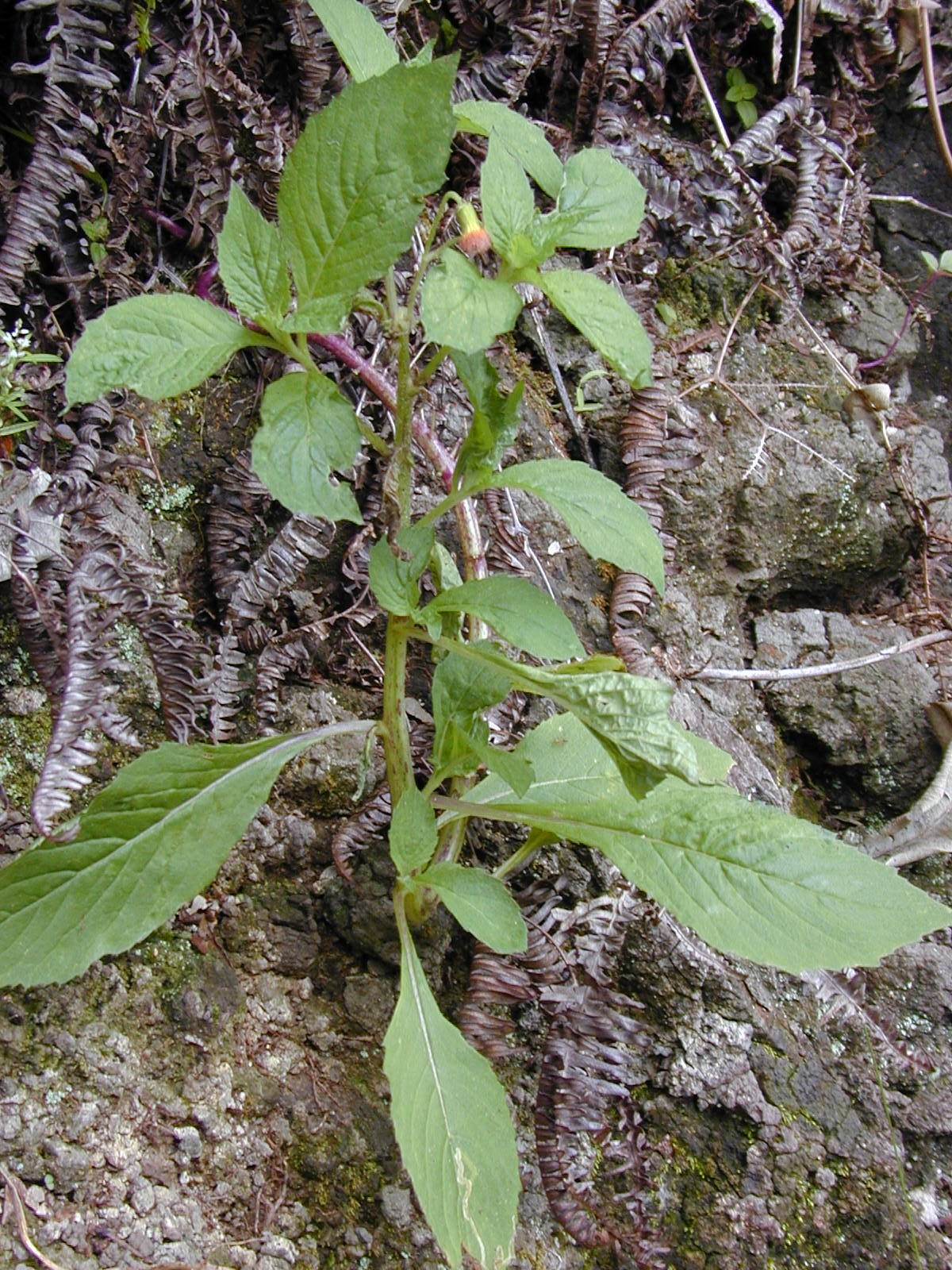
- Crassocephalum crepidioides

Scientific classification
- Kingdom: Plantae
- Clade: Tracheophytes
- Clade: Angiosperms
- Clade: Eudicots
- Clade: Asterids
- Order: Asterales
- Family: Asteraceae
- Subfamily: Asteroideae
- Tribe: Senecioneae
- Genus: Crassocephalum; Moench

Species
- See text

Synonyms
- Cremocephalum Cass.

= Crassocephalum =

Genus of flowering plants

Crassocephalum is a genus the common names of whose members include ragleaf, thickhead, and bologi. Several species are raised as leaf vegetables and used for medicine, especially in West Africa. Similar to Senecio, but differing in never having ray florets. A calyculus of short bracts (c.1/4 to 1/5 of the length of the inner phyllaries) is present. The genus is typically thistle-like in appearance, but all parts are soft and not spiny.

== Species ==
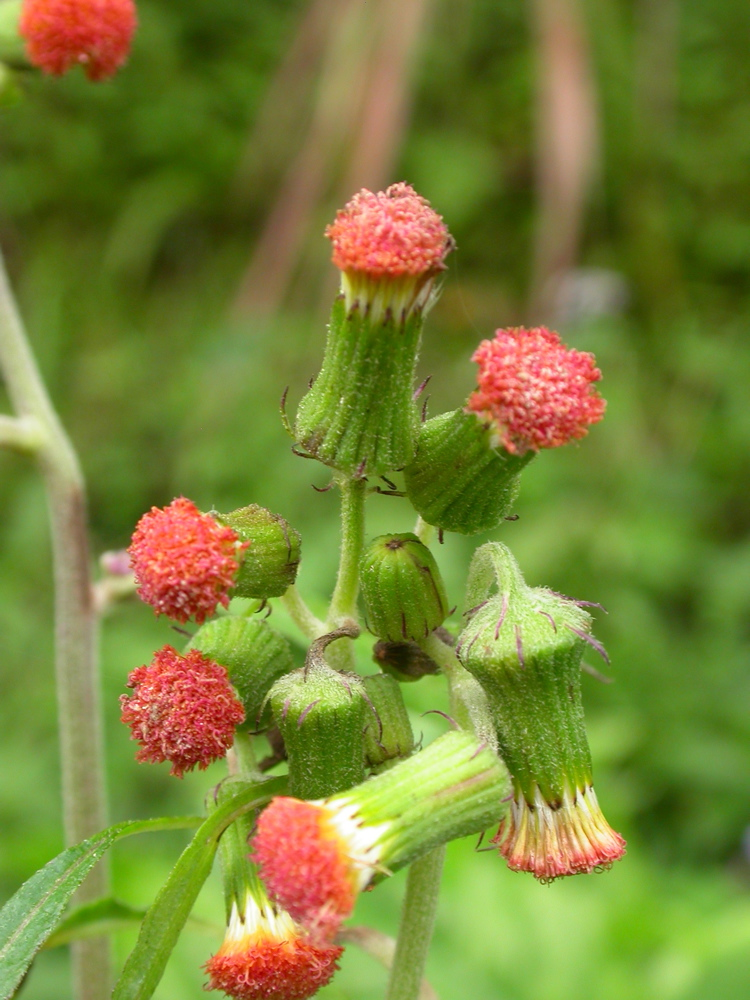
C. crepidioides

Species include:

- Crassocephalum afromontanum R.E. Fr., Acta Horti Berg. 9: 144, 1928
- Crassocephalum aurantiacum (Blume) Kuntze, Revis. Gen. Pl. 1: 331, 1891
- Crassocephalum auriformis S. Moore, J. Linn. Soc., Bot. 37: 171, 1904
- Crassocephalum baoulense (Hutch. & Dalziel) Milne-Redh., Kew Bull. 5: 377, 1951
- Crassocephalum bauchiense (Hutch.) Milne-Redh., Kew Bull. 5: 376, 1951
- Crassocephalum behmianum (Muschl.) S. Moore, J. Bot. 50: 212, 1912
- Crassocephalum biafrae (Oliv. & Hiern) S. Moore, J. Bot. 50: 211, 1912
- Crassocephalum bojeri (DC.) Robyns, Fl. Spermat. Parc Natl. Albert 2: 544, 1947
- Crassocephalum bougheyanum C.D. Adams, J. W. African Sci. Assoc. 3: 111, 1957
- Crassocephalum bumbense S. Moore, J. Linn. Soc., Bot. 47: 279, 1925
- Crassocephalum butaguensis (Muschl.) S. Moore, J. Bot. 50: 211, 1912
- Crassocephalum cernuum (L. f.) Moench, Suppl. Pl. 370, 1781
- Crassocephalum coeruleum (O. Hoffm.) R.E. Fr., Wiss. Erg. Schwed. Rhod.-Kongo Exp. 342, 1916
- Crassocephalum crepidioides (Benth.) S. Moore, J. Bot. 50(595): 211–212, 1912
- Crassocephalum diversifolium Hiern, Cat. Afr. Pl. 1(3): 594, 1898
- Crassocephalum ducis-aprutii (Chiov.) S. Moore, J. Bot. 50: 212, 1912
- Crassocephalum effusum (Mattf.) C. Jeffrey, Kew Bull. 41(4): 907, 1986
- Crassocephalum flavum Decne., Ann. Sci. Nat., Bot., sér. 2, 2: 265, 1834
- Crassocephalum gossweileri S. Moore, J. Bot. 56: 226, 1918
- Crassocephalum gracile (Hook. f.) Milne-Redh. ex Guinea, Anales Jard. Bot. Madrid 1: 307, 1951
- Crassocephalum guineense C.D. Adams, J. W. African Sci. Assoc. 8: 129, 1964
- Crassocephalum heteromorphum (Hutch. & Burtt.) C. Jeffrey, Kew Bull. 41(4): 908, 1986
- Crassocephalum lemuricum (Humbert) Humbert, Fl. Madagasc. 189(3): 832, 1963
- Crassocephalum libericum S. Moore, J. Bot. 54: 282, 1916
- Crassocephalum longirameum S. Moore, J. Bot. 58: 46, 1920
- Crassocephalum luteum (Humbert) Humbert, Fl. Madagasc. 189(3): 836, 1963
- Crassocephalum macropappus (Sch. Bip. ex A. Rich.) S. Moore, J. Bot. 1912(1): 212, 1912
- Crassocephalum manampanihense (Humbert) Humbert, Fl. Madagasc. 189(3): 835, 1963
- Crassocephalum mannii (Hook. f.) Milne-Redh., Kew Bull. 5: 377, 1951
- Crassocephalum miniatum (Welw.) Hiern, Cat. Afr. Pl. 1: 595, 1898
- Crassocephalum montuosum (S. Moore) Milne-Redh., Kew Bull. 5: 376, 1951
- Crassocephalum multicorymbosum (Klatt) S. Moore, J. Bot. 50: 211, 1912
- Crassocephalum notonioides S. Moore, J. Bot. 40: 341, 1902
- Crassocephalum paludum C. Jeffrey, Kew Bull. 41(4): 906, 1986
- Crassocephalum picridifolium (DC.) S. Moore, J. Bot. 50: 212, 1912
- Crassocephalum radiatum S. Moore, J. Bot. 56: 227, 1918
- Crassocephalum rubens (B. Juss. ex Jacq.) S. Moore, J. Bot. 50: 212, 1912
- Crassocephalum ruwenzoriensis S. Moore, J. Linn. Soc., Bot. 35: 352, 1902
- Crassocephalum sarcobasis (DC.) S. Moore, J. Bot. 50: 211, 1912
- Crassocephalum scandens (O. Hoffm.) Hiern, Cat. Afr. Pl. 595, 1898
- Crassocephalum sonchifolium (Baker) Humbert, Fl. Madagasc. 189(3): 834, 1963
- Crassocephalum sonchifolium (L.) Less., Linnaea 6(2): 252, 1831
- Crassocephalum splendens C. Jeffrey, Kew Bull. 41: 905, 1986
- Crassocephalum subscandens (Hochst. ex A. Rich.) S. Moore, J. Bot. 50: 211, 1912
- Crassocephalum togoense C.D. Adams, J. W. African Sci. Assoc. 1: 27, 1954
- Crassocephalum uvens (Hiern) S. Moore, J. Bot. 50: 212, 1912
- Crassocephalum valerianifolium (Link ex Spreng.) Less., Linnaea 5(1): 163, 1830
- Crassocephalum vitellinum (Benth.) S. Moore, J. Bot. 50: 212, 1912
