= Bologi =

Bologi may refer to any of several leaf vegetables eaten in West Africa:

- Basella alba, also called broad bologi
- Talinum fruticosum, also called Lagos bologi
- Crassocephalum biafrae, also called Sierra Leone bologi
- Crassocephalum crepidioides, also called Ebolo
- Crassocephalum rubens, also called Yoruban bologi
