= Velvet (disambiguation) =

Velvet is a particular kind of woven tufted fabric.

Velvet may also refer to:

== Arts, entertainment, and media ==
=== Fictional characters ===
- Velvet, one of the five main characters of Odin Sphere
- Velvet Crowe, one of the main protagonists of Tales of Berseria
- Velvet Hoofstrong, one of the main characters in the video game Them's Fightin' Herds

=== Literature ===
- Velvet (magazine), a pornographic magazine
- Velvet (novel), a 2016 novel by Palestinian author Huzama Habayeb
- Velvet, a comic book series by Ed Brubaker and Steve Epting

=== Music ===
==== Groups and labels ====
- The Velvet Underground, a former American rock band formed in 1964 in New York City
- The Velvets (1959–1962), a doo-wop group
- Velvet Revolver (2002–2008), an American hard rock supergroup

==== Albums ====
- Velvet (Wink album), 1990 album by Japanese band Wink
- Velvet (EP), a 1992 cassette EP by the Toadies
- Velvet (Stoney LaRue album), 2011 album by Stoney LaRue
- Velvet (Adam Lambert album), 2020 album by Adam Lambert
- The Velvet, a 2016 EP by Red Velvet

==== Songs ====
- "Velvet" (Savoy song), a song by Savoy from the 1996 album, Mary Is Coming
- "Velvet", a song by Miss Kittin from the 2002 album On the Road
- "Velvet", a song by Fergie from the 2006 album The Dutchess
- "Velvet" (The Big Pink song), a song by The Big Pink from the 2009 album A Brief History of Love
- "Velvet" (Chris Jamison song), a 2014 song by Chris Jamison

=== Television ===
- Velvet (TV channel), a women-targeted general entertainment channel
- Velvet (TV series), a Spanish TV series
- Velvet Colección, a spin-off of the previous
- Velvet: El nuevo imperio, an American television series based on the Spanish TV series

=== Other uses in arts, entertainment, and media ===
- National Velvet (film), a 1944 American film
- Velvet (film), a 1984 American TV film
- Velvet (musical), an Australian musical partly based on New York's Studio 54
- Velvet (Sirius XM), a contemporary pop music channel on the Sirius XM subscription service
- Velvet Film, a Germany-based film production company founded by Haitian filmmaker Raoul Peck in 1986
- Velvet painting, a type of painting distinguished by the use of velvet (usually black velvet) as the support, in place of canvas, paper, or similar materials
- Velvet (publisher), British publishing imprint

== Biology ==
- Velvet (fish disease), a common disease of tropical aquarium fish
- Velvet (plant), several plants in the genus Verbascum, especially V. thapsus
- Velvet antler, a developmental stage in a deer's antlers

== Other uses ==
- Velvet (bus company) based in Eastleigh, near Southampton, in England
- Velvet (dog), a dog who saved three mountain climbers on Mount Hood, Oregon
- Velvet (music venue), an alternative music club in Rimini, Italy
- Velvet (singer) (born 1975), Swedish singer
- Velvet, Washington, a community in the United States
- Velvet assembler, a set of algorithms for genomic sequence assembly
- Velvet Divorce, the dissolution of Czechoslovakia in 1993
- Velvet Revolution, the nonviolent overthrow of the communist government in Czechoslovakia in 1989
- Velvet Ice Cream Company, an ice cream company in Ohio

== See also ==
- Velveeta, a brand name for a cheese analogue
- Velveting, a Chinese cooking technique
