= Velvet Sky (disambiguation) =

Velvet Sky may refer to:

- Velvet Sky (born Jamie Szantyr), an American professional wrestler
- Velvet Sky (airline), a South African airline
- Velvet Sky, a song by Los Lonely Boys on Los Lonely Boys

== See also ==
- Velvet (disambiguation)
