= WWN =

WWN may refer to:

- Wales West and North Television
- World Wide Name, a Fibre Channel, Serial ATA, and Serial Attached SCSI term
- World Without Nazism
- World Wrestling Network
- Weekly World News, a tabloid newspaper
- W. W. Norton, a book publishing company
- WWNLive
- Waterford Whispers News, an Irish satirical online news website
- World War N, also known as World War 0
