= Velvet Sky (airline) =

South African airline

IATA	ICAO	Call sign
VZ	VEL	VELVET
- Founded: 2009
- Commenced operations: 22 March 2011
- Ceased operations: 27 February 2012
- Operating bases: King Shaka International Airport
- Hubs: King Shaka International Airport
- Fleet size: 4 (in 2012)
- Destinations: 5 (in 2012)
- Parent company: Excalibur Aerospace
- Headquarters: Durban, Kwa-Zulu Natal, South Africa
- Key people: Stephen Nthite (Chairman); Dhevan Pillay (CEO); Paul Green (Director Flight Operations); Captain Neil Brough (Chief Training Captain)
- Website: www.flyvelvetsky.com (defunct)

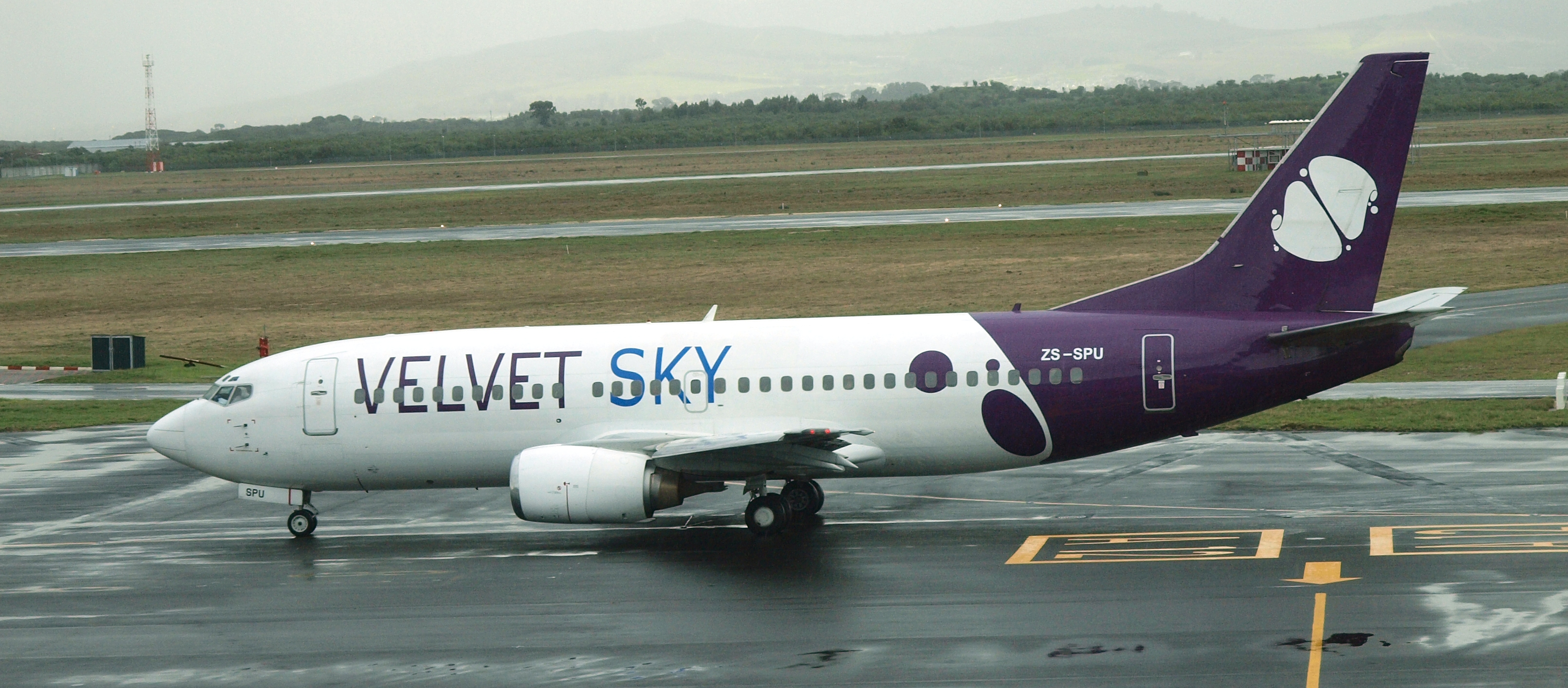
Boeing 737-300 of Velvet Sky

Velvet Sky was a low cost airline based at the King Shaka International Airport near Durban, South Africa. The airline launched in March 2011. It ceased operations in February 2012 and was liquidated in May 2012.

== History ==
Velvet Sky Aviation was established in 2009 as a subsidiary of Macdonald Holdings. Flight operations began on 22 March 2011. It was the only airline based in Durban and claimed to be the first Broad-Based Black Economic Empowerment compliant airline in South Africa.

On 25 March 2011 technical problems with the airline's only aircraft caused a seven-hour delay at Johannesburg. A replacement aircraft had to be chartered and a new aircrew had to be brought in as the Boeing 737, built in 1988, was grounded for repairs. The original crew could not continue the flight as they would have exceeded their duty hours limit. Customers also complained about poor service relating to problems with the airline's website and telephone service.

=== Sale of airline ===
On 1 July 2011 McDonald Holdings announced that it had reached an agreement with Excalibur Aerospace to sell all its shares in the airline. The chairman of Excalibur Aerospace, Stephen Nthite, became the chairman of the airline as a consequence. Confirming the purchase of the airline, Excalibur Aerospace announced that they would retain Dhevan Pillay as CEO and Gary Webb as COO. In addition, the new owners announced plans to increase the fleet of aircraft in operation from August 2011.

=== Route expansion ===
The airline had plans to extend their routes into other countries in Southern Africa when their fleet enlarged.

In November 2011 the airline added a route between Durban and Cape Town direct as well as via Port Elizabeth, when two more 737s were added to their fleet.

Services between Johannesburg and Polokwane International Airport began in September 2011, but were abruptly ended in January 2012 when the airport operator became involved in controversy over corruption.

=== Cancellation of flights and liquidation ===
On 20 January 2012 the airline had its aviation fuel supplies embargoed due to outstanding bills. Temporary measures were put in place to secure fuel, but by late February the supplier, BP Southern Africa, had applied to the Pietermaritzburg, KwaZulu-Natal high court for a liquidation order against the airline. The application was heard on Friday 24 February 2012. The liquidation was not granted immediately and the airline was given time to respond to 5 March 2012. Simultaneously its Air Maintenance Organization (AMO), SAA Technical, withdrew their services, allegedly for unpaid maintenance bills. The ground handling service provider, Menzies Aviation, had also been engaged in payment disputes with the airline for some time.

On 22 February 2012 hundreds of passengers were left stranded at Cape Town International Airport, Velvet Sky Airlines confirmed that its flights were delayed because of a dispute with a service provider.

On Thursday 23 February 2012 the airline was forced to cancel most of its flights due to a lack of an AMO as well as fuel delivery problems. Normal operations resumed after midday on Friday 24 February 2012 but were cancelled again on Monday 27 February after further service provider disputes.

The airline management issued a statement to the media shortly after midday on 27 February 2012 in which it cited the various disputes overpayments to suppliers, the negative publicity generated by the flight cancellations and the need to re-structure the management with a concurrent attempt at re-capitalising the balance sheet as reasons for the suspension of all flight operations to 5 March 2012.

On 7 March the airline and its creditors reached an agreement to postpone the liquidation application indefinitely. One of the creditors applied to launch an application for a business rescue plan. The court gave Umzamo Transport Services (which is owed about R4 million) until 10 April to file supplementary papers to support its rescue plan application.

On 7 May 2012 the airline was placed under provisional liquidation. The liquidation was finalised on 21 June 2012.

== Destinations ==
Velvet Sky served the following destinations:

South Africa

- Cape Town – Cape Town International Airport
- Durban – King Shaka International Airport Hub
- Johannesburg – OR Tambo International Airport
- Port Elizabeth – Port Elizabeth Airport
- Polokwane – Polokwane International Airport

== Fleet ==
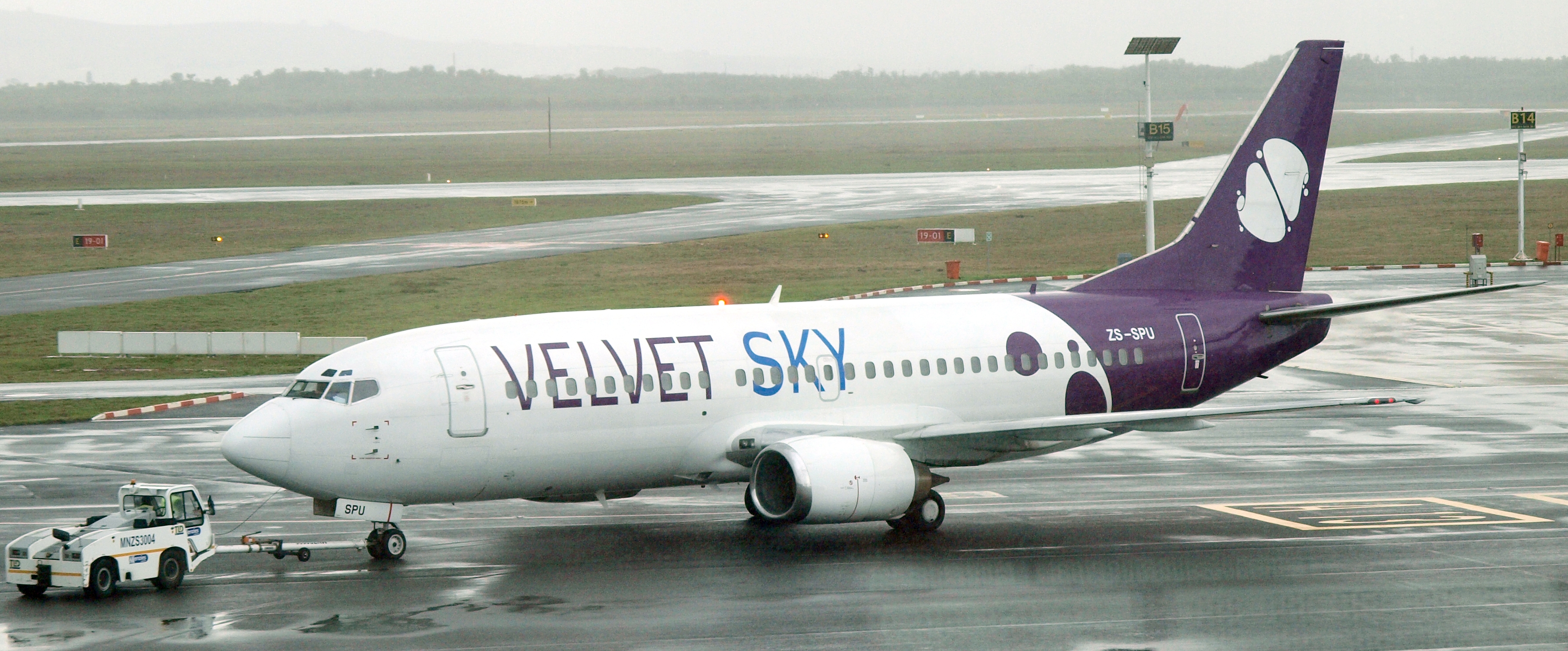
Boeing 737-300 ZS-SPU at Cape Town International Airport

The fleet consisted of three Boeing 737-300s leased from Aergo Capital The aircraft were configured with 148 passenger seats in a single class cabin and a Douglas DC-9 leased from Global Aviation.

Velvet Sky Fleet
Aircraft	Total	Orders	Passengers
Boeing 737-300	3	0	148
McDonnell Douglas DC-9	1	0	110
Total	4	0	
