= Crassocephalum bauchiense =

Conservation status
- Vulnerable (IUCN 3.1)

Scientific classification
- Kingdom: Plantae
- Clade: Tracheophytes
- Clade: Angiosperms
- Clade: Eudicots
- Clade: Asterids
- Order: Asterales
- Family: Asteraceae
- Genus: Crassocephalum
- Species: C. bauchiense

Binomial name
- Crassocephalum bauchiense (Hutch.) Milne-Redh.

Synonyms
- Gynura bauchiensis Hutch.; Gynura caerulea Hutch. & Dalziel

Species of flowering plant

Crassocephalum bauchiense is a species of flowering plant in the family Asteraceae. It is found in Cameroon, Equatorial Guinea, Nigeria, possibly Democratic Republic of the Congo, and possibly Uganda. Its natural habitat is moist savanna. It is threatened by habitat loss.
