= Denis O'Brien =

Irish billionaire businessman (born 1958)

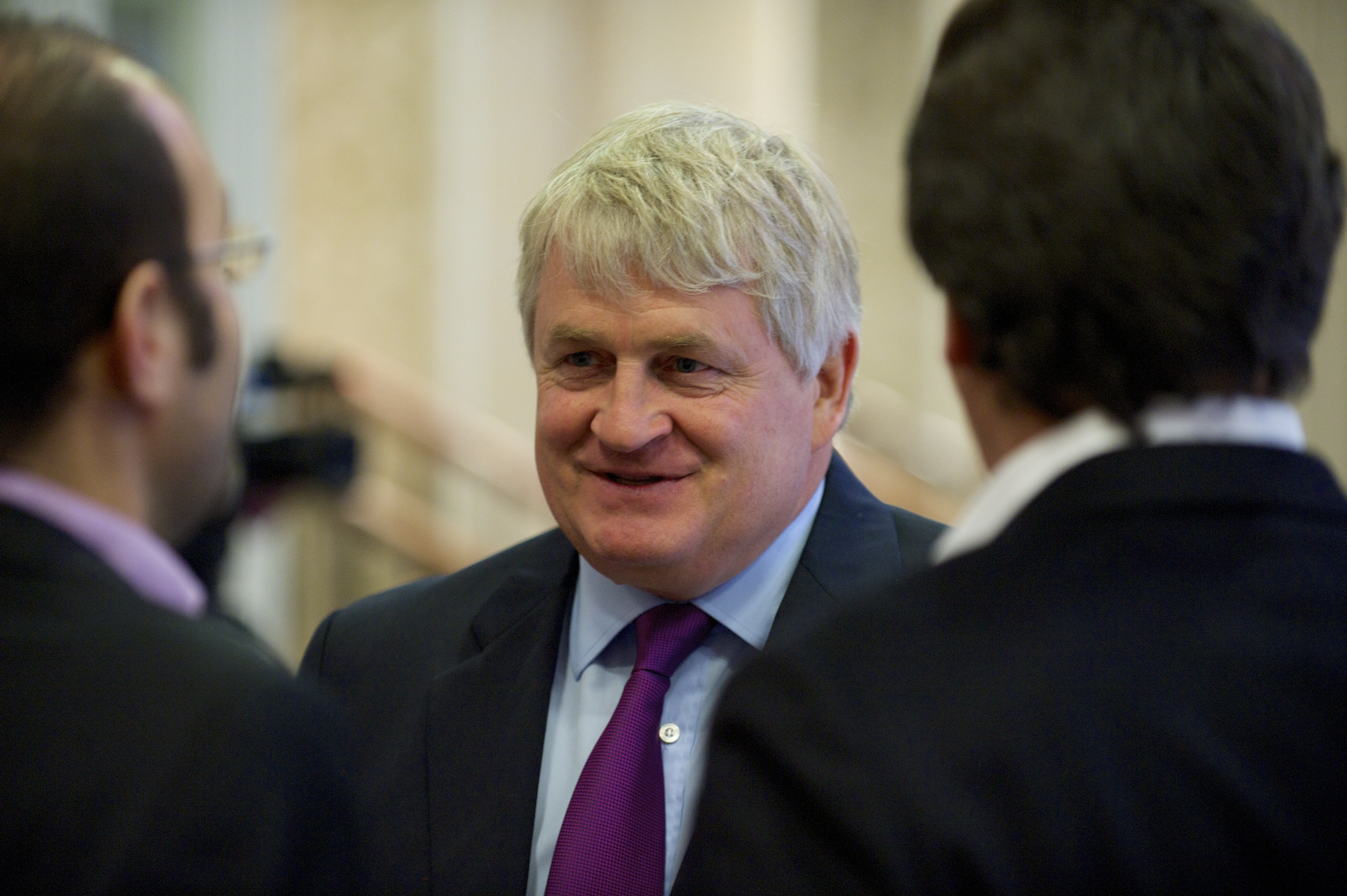
- O'Brien in 2014
- Born: 19 April 1958 (age 68); Cork, Ireland
- Education: The High School, Dublin
- Alma mater: University College Dublin; Boston College
- Occupation: Businessman
- Known for: Chairman and Founder of Digicel Group
- Title: Executive Chairman Digicel
- Spouse: Catherine Walsh (m. 1997)
- Children: 4

Denis O'Brien (born 19 April 1958) is an Irish billionaire businessman, and the founder and owner of Digicel. He was listed among the World's Top 200 Billionaires in 2015 and was Ireland's richest native-born citizen for several years. His business interests have also extended to aircraft leasing (Aergo Capital), utilities support (Actavo), petroleum (Topaz Energy), football (a minority shareholder of Celtic F.C.), and healthcare (Beacon Hospital). As former chairman of the Esat Digifone consortium, O'Brien was questioned by the Moriarty Tribunal, which investigated the awarding of a mobile phone licence to Esat, among other things.

In 2021, O'Brien sold his stake in Communicorp and the Pacific operations of Digicel. O'Brien engages in various philanthropic activities, including being on the board of Concern Worldwide, founding the Iris O'Brien Foundation and establishing a fellowship at Boston College. In 2019, O'Brien earned the Award for Outstanding Achievement from the Irish-US Council.

== Early life ==
O'Brien was born on 19 April 1958 in Cork city. He has one brother and two sisters, and grew up in the Ballsbridge area of Dublin. His father created a medical supply company and later a horse nutrition business. As a child, Denis accompanied his father on business trips, where he learned how to close sales. He attended The High School in Rathgar, where he was once suspended for three months after driving "donuts" in his mother's car on school grounds destroying a large area of grass, until the school asked him back to participate in a rugby championship. Later in life O'Brien paid 3 million euro for a new all weather rugby pitch to be installed, as a gesture of goodwill. His first job was as a hotel bellhop at age 14, and he started working on building cleaning jobs at 15.

In 1977, O'Brien received a BA in politics, history and logic at University College Dublin. While attending UCD, he received a scholarship to attend Boston College, where he completed an MBA.

== Career ==
=== Early stages ===
Upon his return to Dublin, O'Brien was employed at a small investment bank, Trinity Bank, but he left that job to become a personal assistant to Tony Ryan, owner of an aircraft leasing company.

=== Communications and media ===
O'Brien has spent most of his career in the communications technology and mass media industries. He has also been a part owner of energy, aerospace, and industrial service companies.

==== Communicorp ====
O'Brien was until early 2021 the owner of Communicorp, a media holding company operating across Europe. He started the company in Ireland in 1989, where it has owned independent radio stations like Newstalk and Today FM. The company expanded to markets in Eastern European countries, later selling some of its stations to local operators. In 2014, Communicorp expanded to the United Kingdom, acquiring eight radio stations across the country; in 2017, Communicorp moved its UK radio stations to a new independent company, Communicorp UK, of which O'Brien owns 98% of the shares. In February 2021, O'Brien sold Communicorp to Bauer Media Audio for approximately €100 million.

==== Esat Telecom and Esat Digifone ====
In 1991, O'Brien formed a telecommunications consortium called Esat Telecom to compete with the state-owned Telecom Eireann. In partnership with Telenor, Norway's state telecom operator, Esat formed Esat Digifone, which made a successful bid for Ireland's second GSM mobile licence. Circumstances around the awarding of the licence to Esat Digifone became the subject of the Moriarty Tribunal.

On 7 November 1997, Esat Telecom Group plc held an initial public offering and was listed on the Irish Stock Exchange, London Stock Exchange, and NASDAQ. In 2000, Telenor made a bid for control of the company, but O'Brien sold it to BT, reportedly making €250 million from the sale.

==== Aergo Capital ====
In 1999, O'Brien co-founded aircraft leasing company Aergo Capital, in which he owned an 80% stake. From its inception until 2014, Aergo traded more than 150 aircraft with a gross value of over €791 million (approximately $1 billion). In October 2014, O'Brien and his partner, Fred Browne, sold the company to CarVal, a US investment firm; Browne remained with the new company as CEO.

==== Independent News & Media ====
In the late 2000s, O'Brien began purchasing shares of Independent News & Media (INM), ultimately spending an estimated €500 million to amass a 29.9% stake in the company. O'Brien clashed with the company's board, especially former owner Tony O'Reilly, who stepped down from his position as CEO in 2009 and sold most of his INM shares in 2014. In April 2019, O'Brien and Dermont Desmond, INM's second largest shareholder at the time, sold their shares to the Belgian media group Mediahuis; O'Brien reportedly received €43.5m as part of the deal.

Although he never owned a majority stake in INM, O'Brien was at times accused of exerting significant influence at the company. In 2014, allegations arose that Stephen Rae, a group editor at INM, ordered amendments to a column by Sunday Independent editor Anne Harris that contained references to O'Brien. In 2015, Paul Meagher, a solicitor for O'Brien, reportedly called INM solicitor Simon McAleese in 2012 to block a story related to environment minister Phil Hogan.

In March 2018, the Office of the Director of Corporate Enforcement (ODCE) in Ireland applied to the High Court of Ireland to appoint inspectors to Independent News and Media to investigate an alleged data breach. According to an affidavit filed by the ODCE, invoices for the data interrogation were discharged by Blaydon Limited.

In June 2019, Independent News & Media was sold to the Belgian group Mediahuis and de-listed from the Euronext Dublin exchange, thus ending O'Brien's involvement in the group. It was reported that he lost in excess of €450m in total on his INM investment.

==== Digicel ====
In 2001, O'Brien founded Digicel, a telecom company that operates in the Caribbean, Central America, and Asia Pacific. Using the cash from his sale of Esat Telecom, O'Brien used Digicel to build a wireless network in Jamaica. That same year, Digicel expanded into the South Pacific. As of 2022, Digicel operates in 25 countries.

Along with Digicel, O'Brien created the Digicel Foundation, which has worked with local organizations to develop community services, build schools and health centers, and support recovery efforts. After the 2010 Haiti earthquake, O'Brien pledged €3.5 million to assist recovery efforts. In 2012, President Michel Martelly of Haiti awarded O'Brien with the National Order of Honour and Merit for his investments, contributions and promotion of the country, and in 2015, O'Brien received honorary membership of the Order of Jamaica for his service to the country's telecommunications industry.

In May 2020, Digicel filed for bankruptcy court reorganization and successfully sought a debt restructuring agreement. A debt exchange was approved by the company's bondholders and took place in June 2020. As part of the exchange, O'Brien agreed to contribute $50 million of assets to Digicel, including $25 million in cash and the company's Jamaican headquarters.

In October 2021, Digicel announced the sale of its Pacific operations to Telstra Corp, an Australian telecommunications company. Valued at US$1.85 billion, the sale was completed in July 2022, with Telstra agreeing to pay Digicel US$1.6 billion before adjustments and deductions. Telstra purchased all six Digicel Pacific markets, including Fiji, Nauru, Papua New Guinea, Samoa, Tonga, and Vanuatu.

==== Actavo ====
In 2012, O'Brien purchased Siteserv, a utilities support company, from IBRC for €45m; in 2015, the company was renamed Actavo. Actavo was bought and controlled through O'Brien's firm Millington on the Isle of Man.

In 2016, Actavo expanded into the United States through the purchase of Atlantic Engineering Services, a structural engineering firm. Actavo was also involved in the installation of fibre networks for Digicel in the Caribbean.

==== Topaz Energy ====
In December 2013, O'Brien purchased €300 million in debt owed by Topaz Energy to the Irish Bank Resolution Corporation. In December 2014, Topaz's parent company, Kendrick Investments, announced it would buy all of Esso's Irish operations.

In December 2015, Alimentation Couche-Tard, a Canadian convenience store company, announced that it planned to buy Topaz. The sale was completed in February 2016; Topaz had more than 2,000 employees and close to 35% of the consumer market in Ireland at the time of the sale.

==== Davos and bank directorships ====
O'Brien has attended the World Economic Forum's annual winter meeting in Davos, Switzerland, alongside other billionaires like Bill Gates and George Soros.

In 2000, O'Brien became a director of the Bank of Ireland, and in September 2005, he was named a deputy governor of the bank. In September 2006, he resigned as both deputy governor and as a member of the bank's court (board). O'Brien reportedly resigned due to increased demands related to his international business interests.

==== Football ====
O'Brien considered purchasing Doncaster Rovers in the early 2000's, having owned the club's ground Belle Vue since 1998.

Between 2008 and 2016, O'Brien gave the Football Association of Ireland (FAI) as much as €12 million to help pay the salaries of senior officials within the organisation, including Giovanni Trapattoni. In 2018, O'Brien was named Honorary Life President of the FAI.

In 2006, O'Brien purchased a 2.82% stake in Glasgow-based Celtic F.C. from a former manager of the club, Martin O'Neill. As of June 2018, O'Brien reportedly had increased his ownership to 13%.

==== Other business interests ====
In 1998, O'Brien purchased Planal SA, the holding company for the Quinta do Lago golf resort in Algarve, Portugal.

== Moriarty Tribunal ==
In 1997, the Moriarty Tribunal was established to look into allegations against two Irish politicians, Charles Haughey and Michael Lowry. After 14 years, the Tribunal's final report found, among other things, that Lowry, Ireland's then energy and communications minister, assisted O'Brien in his bid to secure a mobile phone contract for Esat Digifone. The tribunal found that this happened after Fine Gael received a $50,000 donation from O'Brien via a circuitous route, although the tribunal also acknowledged that the money was not intended as a payment. However, because the Tribunal was not a court of law, its findings were legally "sterile".

In 2018, Michael Lowry won an appeal over the Moriarty Tribunal's legal costs. The appeal judges awarded Lowry 80% of his costs for the legal battle. That same year, the High Court ruled that the State was not entitled to indemnity and contribution from O'Brien's telecommunications company regarding any loss that might arise from the granting of the country's second mobile phone licence in 1996. In 2021, the High Court upheld the 2018 ruling after the State attempted to appeal it. Three judges unanimously dismissed the appeal and stated that O'Brien's telecommunications company was entitled to the legal costs of the appeal.

Sam Smyth, a radio show host that aired on one of O'Brien's networks, claimed he was fired as a result of his reporting on the Moriarty Tribunal. Today FM responded to the claim, stating that "the decision was made to address a decline in listenership and was part of an initiative to improve programming quality." The Today FM board supported the decision, which was one of several programming changes made by Willy O'Reilly.

== Relationship with the media ==
In 2012, O'Brien threatened to sue journalist and broadcaster Vincent Browne over statements in Browne's articles that O'Brien claimed were defamatory.

In February 2013, O'Brien sued the Irish Daily Mail for defamation over his numerous appearances in RTÉ News reports on the relief effort after the Haiti earthquake. The court awarded O'Brien €150,000. The case was the first time a journalist had attempted to use the honest opinion defence before a jury at the High Court since the Defamation Act 2009 became law.

In August 2015, the editor-in-chief of the satirical website Waterford Whispers News, Colm Williamson received a cease and desist order from O'Brien's solicitor to remove a satirical article about O'Brien. Lawyers for O'Brien also demanded that a reprint of the story be removed from Broadsheet.ie. Waterford Whispers News subsequently removed the article.

In 2019, O'Brien began an action for defamation against the Sunday Business Post over articles published in the newspaper in March 2015. The articles, which centred around a confidential PricewaterhouseCoopers (PwC) report given to the government in November 2008 on the exposure of Ireland's banks in 2008, identified O'Brien as being among the 22 biggest borrowers from Irish banks in 2008. O'Brien claimed the articles defamed him and injured his reputation and also alleged malicious publication. The jury found in the defendant's favour and Justice Barton dismissed the case with an order for costs against O'Brien.

== Irish Bank Resolution Corporation (IBRC) debt ==
Through the acquisitions of Siteserv and Topaz Energy, O'Brien at one time held hundreds of millions of Euros in debt from the state-owned IBRC. In February 2013, the IBRC went into liquidation, and shortly thereafter, O'Brien asked for an extension to repay an outstanding €320m in loans. O'Brien claimed that he had previously received verbal confirmation for a loan extension from former IBRC CEO Mike Aynsley, but Aynsley's position was terminated when the bank went into liquidation.

The matter became public in May 2015, when TD Catherine Murphy attempted to raise it in the Dáil Éireann. According to Murphy, O'Brien allegedly wrote to the IBRC's special liquidator, Kieran Wallace, seeking the repayment terms he had verbally secured from Aynsley; both Aynsley and O'Brien denied the claims.

On 16 June 2015, O'Brien sued the Houses of the Oireachtas Commission, the Government of Ireland and the Attorney General over remarks made by Murphy and Sinn Féin TD Pearse Doherty about his banking affairs in the Dáil Éireann. O'Brien alleged that the remarks were a breach of parliamentary privilege that violated his constitutional rights and his rights under the European Convention on Human Rights. The Oireachtas Committee on Procedures and Privileges previously rejected O'Brien's request to sanction Murphy over her allegations about his financial arrangements, which he claimed had breached parliamentary privilege.

=== RTÉ injunction ===
In 2015, O'Brien and Kieran Wallace, the special liquidator who oversaw the liquidation of IBRC, successfully applied for an injunction in Ireland's High Court preventing RTÉ from airing a report about his receipt of a low interest rate on loans from the IBRC. Justice Donald Binchy, the High Court judge who granted the injunction, said that the public did not have the right to see confidential banking information of IBRC customers, and that RTÉ had failed to prove that the terms of the loan were handled improperly by the IBRC.

After the judgment, several media outlets reported that Catherine Murphy had spoken, but did not provide any quotes or clips from her speech. The Independent, owned by Independent News & Media, of which O'Brien then held a significant interest, reported, "Mr. O'Brien successfully stopped RTÉ from broadcasting" details about O'Brien's finances that Murphy had raised in the Daíl. Several Irish media outlets ignored the injunction by publishing Murphy's comments or referring to their publication on the Oireachtas website.

In mid-June 2015, Justice Binchy ruled that most of RTÉ's report on Denis O'Brien's financial relationship with the IBRC could be published. On 17 June 2015, RTÉ published what it called "a curtailed version" of the story, claiming that two paragraphs of the original story could not be printed because they were still covered by the High Court's injunction. The article was accompanied by a timeline of events between February and June 2013.

O'Brien defended the injunction in an Irish Times op-ed piece, stating that he had been shocked that somebody took confidential files from a bank, altered them, and then leaked them to the press. He claimed to have been vilified by enemies, competitors, politicians, and others for trying to defend his privacy.

=== IBRC Commission of investigation ===
On 10 June 2015, a Commission of investigation was established to inquire into IBRC transactions that lost €10 million or more between 21 January 2009 and 7 February 2013. The commission was initially chaired by retired High Court Judge Daniel O'Keeffe, but in July 2015, Judge Brian Cregan replaced Judge O'Keeffe as the commission's chair and sole member. The terms of the commission were updated in 2016 to focus first on IBRC's sale of Siteserv to O'Brien in 2012, based on claims by TD Catherine Murphy in the Daíl Éireann; Murphy was asked to appear before the commission in February 2019, several months after criticising the amount of time it had taken the commission to complete its inquiry, but as of May 2019, she had not made herself available for testimony. In November 2019, Murphy announced that she would not appear before the commission because she was concerned that she would be required to reveal the source of her information.

In September 2022, the commission released its final report on its investigation into the sale of Siteserv. The report stated that while the sale was "carried out in good faith," it was "based on misleading and incomplete information." However, the report went on to say that there was no evidence that O'Brien received favourable interest rates from the bank, as alleged by Catherine Murphy. It also stated that O'Brien was not at fault for going on a trip with Robert Dix, and there was no evidence to support the claim that O'Brien had an unduly close or unethical relationship with senior IBRC executives.

== Recognition ==
O'Brien received an honorary Doctor of Law degree from his alma mater, UCD, in 2006.

In 2019, the Irish-US Council awarded O'Brien the 2019 Award for Outstanding Achievement for his work building bonds between Ireland and the United States.

== Personal life ==
In August 1997, O'Brien married Catherine Walsh, who helped Communicorp expand into the Czech Republic and who earlier was the head of marketing for Independent Radio Sales. The couple have four children. One of his three sisters is the artist Abigail O'Brien, President of Irish arts body, the Royal Hibernian Academy, for 2018–2023. O'Brien is a resident of Malta for tax purposes.

=== Sponsorships and causes ===
In June 2000, O'Brien set up the Iris O'Brien Foundation, named after his mother, through which he coordinates many of his philanthropic efforts, and has supported multiple charities and campaign groups, including the human rights group Front Line Defenders. Front Line Defenders was co-founded by O'Brien in 2001, to help protect human rights defenders globally, and O'Brien remains its chairman as of 2021.

O'Brien supported the 2003 Special Olympics World Summer Games, for which he was the chairman of the Games Organising Committee and later the Chairman of the Council of Patrons. In 2004, O'Brien helped to establish the Digicel Foundation, which has funded thousands of projects in the Caribbean and Pacific.

As of 2012, O'Brien was a member of the United States board of Concern Worldwide, a humanitarian aid organisation. O'Brien has worked with the Clinton Global Initiative (CGI). After the 2010 Haiti earthquake, O'Brien worked with CGI's Haiti Action Network and the Digicel Haiti Foundation to help rebuild the Iron Market in Port-au-Prince. In 2010, O'Brien was named a goodwill ambassador for the city of Port-au-Prince, Haiti, by Mayor Jean Yves Jason, who cited O'Brien's help with disaster recovery efforts after the earthquake. In 2012, O'Brien received a Clinton Global Citizen Award from former U.S. President Bill Clinton, in large part due to his disaster relief efforts in Haiti. He also contributed to building 50 primary and secondary schools in the 18 months following the earthquake. In September 2016, then Republican presidential candidate Donald Trump sent a campaign email criticising Hillary Clinton's relationship with O'Brien, about which O'Brien declined to comment.

In 2015, O'Brien established a fully-funded fellowship for Irish students to receive an MBA degree from Boston College. O'Brien has also been a member of the Trilateral Commission.

O'Brien donated €2,500 to the campaign of independent candidate Mary Davis for the 2011 Irish presidential election.

=== Wealth and residences ===
As of February 2020, Forbes estimated O'Brien's wealth to be approximately $3.2 billion.

Sometime after his purchase of Quinta do Lago in 1998, but before Esat Telecom's sale to BT in 2000, O'Brien sold his home in Dublin and established a primary residence in Portugal. Media reports suggested that the move was spurred by a then-existing exemption to capital gains tax in the Irish-Portuguese tax treaty, which reportedly would have saved O'Brien about €63 million in taxes. However, in 2013, the High Court officially ruled that O'Brien's home was Quinta de Lago, Almancil, Portugal, and not Ireland, in the 2000/2001 tax year.

While considering the flotation of Digicel on the New York Stock Exchange, a March 2006 filing to the Companies Registration Office (CRO) listed O'Brien's residential address as Sliema, Malta.
