= Waterford Whispers News =

Irish satire news website

- Website type: Political satire; Social satire
- Available in: English
- Owner: Whispers Media Ltd.
- Creator: Colm Williamson
- Editors: Colm Williamson; Gerry McBride; Karl Moylan
- Website: waterfordwhispersnews.com
- Commercial: Yes (free content, paid advertising)
- Registration: Optional, but registration is required for posting to WWN articles
- Launched: June 2009; 17 years ago
- Current status: Online

Waterford Whispers News (WWN) is an Irish satirical news website run by Colm Williamson and based in Tramore, County Waterford, Ireland. The site has been called Ireland's answer to U.S. satirical media company, The Onion, and has been the source of several satirical articles that gained international notability, including: North Korea Lands First Ever Man On The Sun, Confirms Central News Agency, and "Jesus Not Coming Back By The Looks Of It" Admits Vatican.

== History ==
The website originated from a Facebook page set up in June 2009 by Tipperary-native Colm Williamson, who became unemployed after moving from Dublin to Tramore in Waterford just before the Irish economic downturn. Williamson chose the name as a reference to the game Chinese whispers.

In 2014, the Irish Times called Waterford Whispers News "Ireland's answer to The Onion".

Since 2014, Waterford Whispers News has published selections of their best stories, plus new material, in an annual year book.

In a 2014 interview with the Irish Independent, Williamson noted how strict Irish libel laws are compared to those in the United States.

In 2015, when discussing the Denis O'Brien article, Williamson noted that unlike physical newspapers, purely online sites have the ability to take down a story when issued with a "cease and desist" notice from a law firm.

In October 2018, Williamson said WWN had three writers (including Williamson), the original IT developer McCabe, and was still based in Tramore.

Since October 2018, WWN has branched out from a solely online format into a tour of live performances in Ireland.

For New Year's Eve 2020, WWN produced a 23-second comedy sketch for RTÉ, in which it portrayed God as a rapist who impregnated a Middle Eastern immigrant. The sketch earned more than 1,000 complaints and condemnation from Ireland's Catholic primate, Eamon Martin. RTÉ apologised for the content. The channel stated that the sketch violated its own broadcast guidelines on causing undue offence to religious groups.

== Notable articles ==
Williamson described their "big breakthrough" as their January 2014 article: North Korea Lands First Ever Man On The Sun, Confirms Central News Agency. The "scoop" was picked up by Canadian blogs, American talk shows, and Indian and Chinese television. In 2018, Williamson said the story continued to be one of WWN's most viewed articles.

Williamson has said in interviews that his favorite notable WWN article was in April 2014: "Jesus Not Coming Back By The Looks Of It" Admits Vatican. The article, citing a fictional cardinal, Cardinal Giorgio Salvadore, was repeated by other U.S. sources, including religious groups, such that it caught the attention of Snopes, who rated it false in 2016. TruthOrFiction.com also covered it in 2017.

In May 2015, the site gained further international notoriety with the headline: Dozens Injured In Stampede After Second Checkout In Lidl Opens, which was mistaken by German magazine, Focus, as genuine. Focus magazine ran the story as "Customers trigger mass panic in Lidl outlet", however they retracted the article stating: "An earlier version lacked the info that it was satire".

In August 2015, WWN received a cease and desist letter to take down a satirical article written about Irish businessman, Denis O'Brien, titled: Denis O'Brien Receives 20-year Jail Sentance for Mobile Phone License Bribe in Parallel Universe. Williamson tweeted an image of the letter that was sent to him from Meagher Solicitors, and which was addressed to the website's publishers Whispers Media Ltd. Williamson described the affair as an example of the Streisand Effect, and that "The whole thing went crazy. It was all over the news".

In May 2018, WWN listed an article titled: Palestine Granted Permission To Compete In Eurovision 2019, which went sufficiently viral to attract a false rating from leading fact-checking site, Snopes, as well as other fact-checking sites. While Snopes recognise that WWN is a satirical news website and not a deliberate fake news website, they have intervened to tag other WWN articles as false where they have gained sufficient virial notability, including (as well as the previous articles above): Did Trump Appoint Bill Cosby as Secretary for Women’s Rights? (2016), NASA Admits It Is in Contact with Alien Species and Just Forgot to Mention It (2016), Rock Legend Animal Is Not Dead (2016), and Was J.K. Rowling Hired to Rewrite the Bible? (2014).

== Site traffic ==
In May 2014, WWN announced that it had appointed an Irish media agency to manage its advertising business, having previously relied on Google's AdSense program for revenue. At the time of the appointment, the Irish Times reported WWN had 800,000 sessions per month. In May 2016, the Irish Times reported that WWN had 1.25 million sessions per month, and over 14 million per year.

In November 2018, in an interview with Sunday Business Post, Williamson said that Facebook's new anti-fake news measures had halved WWN traffic and would cause the site to lose money in 2019.

As of April 2019, WWN had a global Alexa rank of 120,236 and an Irish Alexa rank of 661. The site averaged circa 600,000 sessions per month during 2019, and over 6 million sessions for 2018. The United States was responsible for over 35% of traffic, the United Kingdom for 17% of traffic and Ireland for 16% of traffic.

== Bibliography ==
- Colm Williamson (October 2018). Waterford Whispers News 2018. Gill Books. ISBN 978-0717181469.
- Colm Williamson (November 2017). Waterford Whispers News Newsageddon. Gill Books. ISBN 978-0717179503.
- Colm Williamson (October 2016). Waterford Whispers Breaking News. Blackstaff Press. ISBN 978-0856409882.
- Colm Williamson (October 2015). Waterford Whispers News: Takes Over the World. Blackstaff Press. ISBN 978-0856409547.
- Colm Williamson (November 2014). Waterford Whispers News. Blackstaff Press. ISBN 978-0856409332.

== See also ==
- The Onion
- The Phoenix (magazine)
- List of satirical news websites
