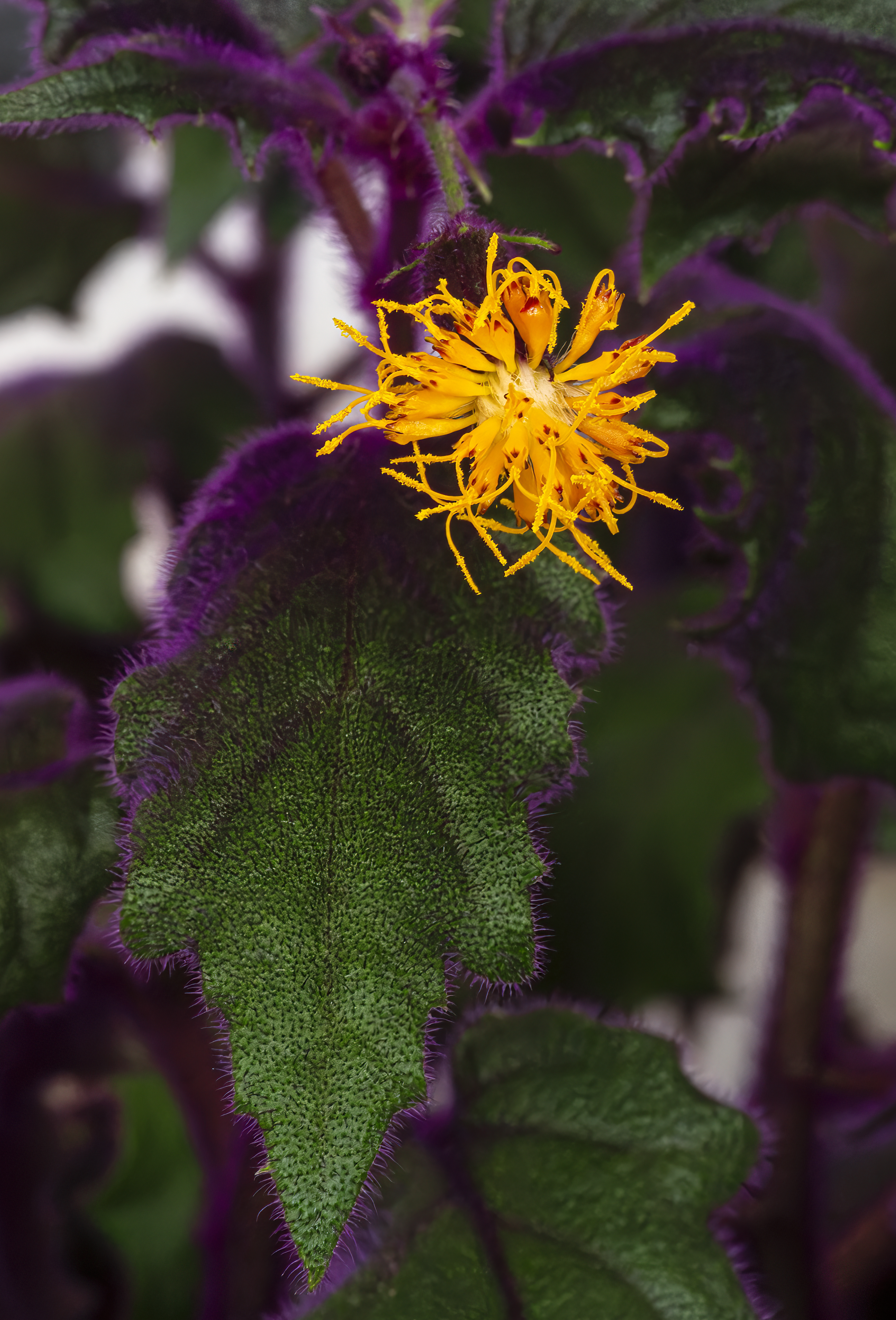
- Gynura aurantiaca

Scientific classification
- Kingdom: Plantae
- Clade: Tracheophytes
- Clade: Angiosperms
- Clade: Eudicots
- Clade: Asterids
- Order: Asterales
- Family: Asteraceae
- Subfamily: Asteroideae
- Tribe: Senecioneae
- Genus: Gynura; Cass.

Synonyms
- Gynaecura Hassk.

= Gynura =

Genus of Asian daisies

Gynura is a genus of flowering plants in the daisy family Asteraceae native to Asia. The best known species is Gynura aurantiaca, often grown as a house plant. This plant is commonly known as purple passion because of the velvety purple leaves.

Species

- Gynura abbreviata F.G.Davies
- Gynura albicaulis W.W.Sm.
- Gynura amplexicaulis Oliv. & Hiern
- Gynura aurantiaca (Blume) Sch.Bip. ex DC.
- Gynura barbareifolia Gagnep.
- Gynura batorensis F.G.Davies
- Gynura bicolor (Roxb. ex Willd.) DC. (Okinawa spinach; nutritious cooked vegetable. Known as KinJiSo in Japan. Known as Hong FengCai (紅鳳菜) in Taiwan.)
- Gynura brassii F.G.Davies
- Gynura calciphila Kerr
- Gynura campanulata C.Jeffrey
- Gynura carnosula Zoll. & Mor.
- Gynura cernua (Cass.) Benth.
- Gynura colaniae Merr.
- Gynura colorata F.G.Davies
- Gynura cusimbua (D.Don) S.Moore
- Gynura divaricata (L.) DC.
- Gynura drymophila (F.Muell.) F.G.Davies
- Gynura elberti J.Kost.
- Gynura elliptica Y.Yabe & Hayata ex Hayata
- Gynura emeiensis Z.Y.Zhu
- Gynura formosana Kitam.
- Gynura fulva F.G.Davies
- Gynura grandifolia F.G.Davies
- Gynura haematophylla DC.
- Gynura hispida Thwaites
- Gynura hmopaengensis H.Koyama
- Gynura japonica (Thunb.) Juel
- Gynura lycopersicifolia DC.
- Gynura malaccensis Belcher
- Gynura mauritiana
- Gynura micheliana J.-G.Adam
- Gynura nepalensis DC. (cholesterol spinach; supposedly cholesterol-lowering)
- Gynura nitida DC.
- Gynura panershenia Z.Y.Zhu
- Gynura procumbens (Lour.) Merr.
- Gynura proschii Briq.
- Gynura pseudochina (L.) DC.
- Gynura rubiginosa Elmer
- Gynura sarmentosa "Aureo-variegata", "Pink Ice"
- Gynura scandens O.Hoffm.
- Gynura sechellensis (Baker) Hemsl.
- Gynura steenisii F.G.Davies
- Gynura sundaiaca F.G.Davies
- Gynura taiwanensis S.S.Ying
- Gynura travancorica W.W.Sm.
- Gynura valeriana Oliv.
- Gynura vidaliana Elmer
- Gynura zeylanica Trim.
