= Rich Buhler =

American radio talk show host, author, and pastor (1946–2012)

- Born: July 17, 1946; Cottonwood, Arizona, U.S.
- Died: May 7, 2012 (aged 65); Anaheim, California, U.S.
- Education: Biola University
- Occupations: Talk show host, Entrepreneur
- Known for: Talk from the Heart
- Spouse(s): Linda Bates, Dianne Buhler
- Website: http://www.richbuhler.com/

Rich Buhler (July 17, 1946 – May 7, 2012) was an American evangelical Christian radio talk show host, writer, and pastor. He held honorary doctorates from Biola University and Trinity College of Graduate Studies. He is best known for his radio show, Talk from the Heart. He created www.truthorfiction.com. He died May 7, 2012, of causes relating to pancreatic cancer.

== Career ==
=== Journalism and radio ===
Buhler worked for the on-campus radio station while attending Biola University. After graduating at age 17, he got his first job, as an office assistant at KFWB in Los Angeles. He worked his way up to the position of journalist and eventually news editor.

=== Ministry ===
Buhler was pastor of a Foursquare Christian church for nine years.

=== Talk show host ===
In 1981, he left the full-time ministry to start a radio show called Talk From the Heart on KBRT. He pitched the show to station owner Don Crawford and, when no other suitable host could be found, became the host himself. The show was syndicated all over the US and some of Canada.

Buhler wrote several books during this time and was an in-demand speaker at conferences, retreats, churches, and organizations.

He retired from full-time radio in 1996 but returned briefly in 2008.

=== Entrepreneur ===
Buhler was the founder and president of Branches Communications, an LA company that produced radio, TV, and film media for many years.

He also founded www.TruthOrFiction.com in 1999.

He also published "The eRumor Report", a regular email update.

== Talk From the Heart ==
In 1980, Buhler was asked to put together a nationally syndicated talk show. The show is considered to have been "pioneering" in Christian talk radio.

== Death ==
On May 7, 2012, Rich Buhler died from pancreatic cancer.

== Books ==
- Love, No Strings Attached (1987, Thomas Nelson ISBN 0840776012)
- Pain and Pretending (1988, Thomas Nelson, ISBN 0840776276)
- New Choices, New Boundaries (1991, Thomas Nelson ISBN 0840774834)
- Be Good to Yourself (1994, Thomas Nelson ISBN 0840767870)
- Shame (Unpublished)
- The Stranger Who Belonged (Unpublished)
