= Velvet plant =

Velvet plant is a common name for several plants and may refer to:

- Gynura aurantiaca, native to southeast Asia
- Verbascum
