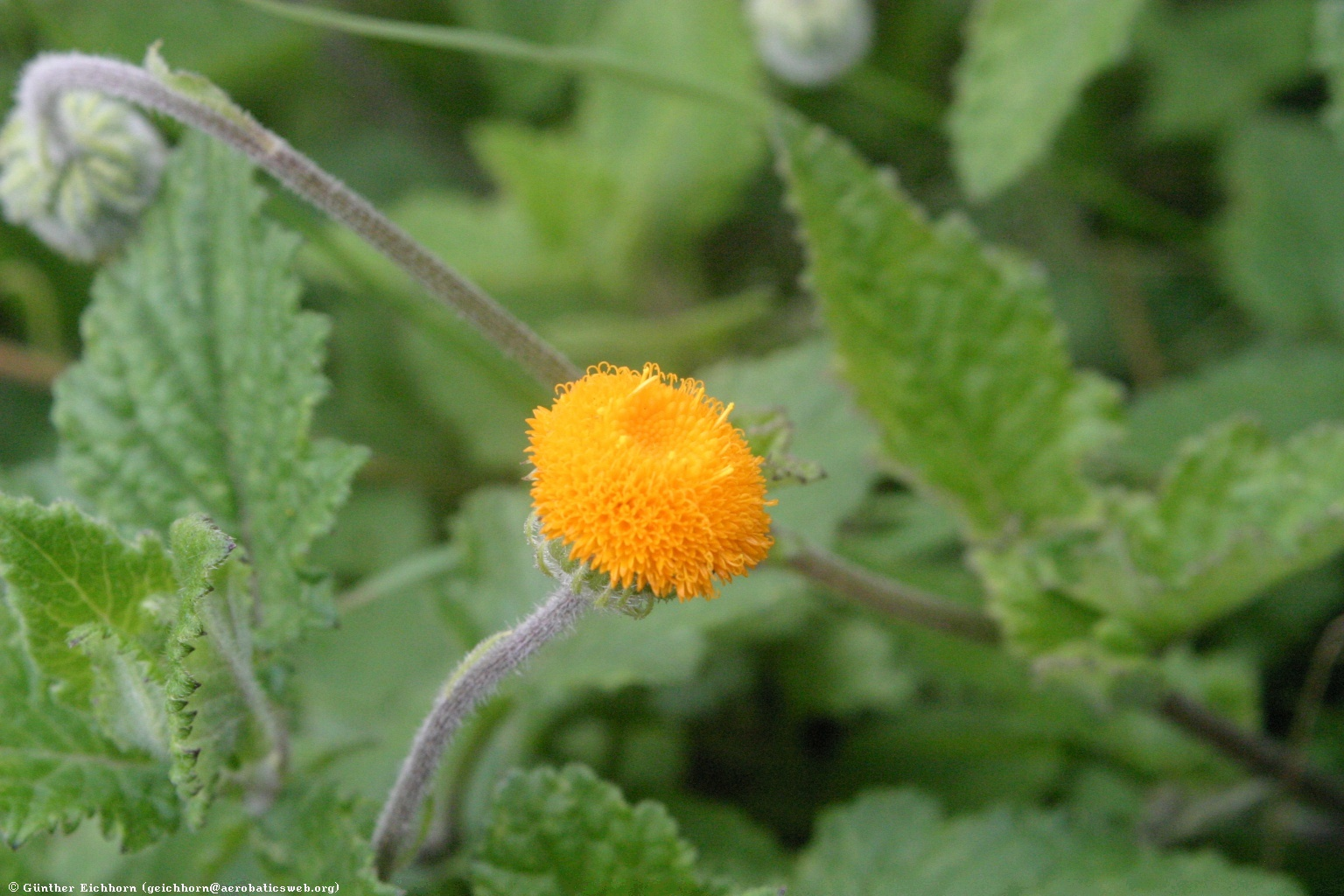
- Crassocephalum vitellinum in Nyungwe National Park in Rwanda

Scientific classification
- Kingdom: Plantae
- Clade: Tracheophytes
- Clade: Angiosperms
- Clade: Eudicots
- Clade: Asterids
- Order: Asterales
- Family: Asteraceae
- Genus: Crassocephalum
- Species: C. vitellinum

Binomial name
- Crassocephalum vitellinum (Benth.) S.Moore

= Crassocephalum vitellinum =

Species of flowering plant

Crassocephalum vitellinum is a flowering herb from Africa.

== Distribution ==
Bioko, Burundi, Cameroon, Kenya, Rwanda, Uganda, Tanzania, Zambia, Zaire.
