= Crassocephalum bougheyanum =

Conservation status
- Near Threatened (IUCN 2.3)

Scientific classification
- Kingdom: Plantae
- Clade: Tracheophytes
- Clade: Angiosperms
- Clade: Eudicots
- Clade: Asterids
- Order: Asterales
- Family: Asteraceae
- Genus: Crassocephalum
- Species: C. bougheyanum

Binomial name
- Crassocephalum bougheyanum C.D.Adams

Species of flowering plant

Crassocephalum bougheyanum is a species of flowering plant in the family Asteraceae. It is found in Cameroon and Equatorial Guinea. Its natural habitat is subtropical or tropical dry forests. It is threatened by habitat loss.
