= Solanecio =

Scientific classification
- Kingdom: Plantae
- Clade: Tracheophytes
- Clade: Angiosperms
- Clade: Eudicots
- Clade: Asterids
- Order: Asterales
- Family: Asteraceae
- Tribe: Senecioneae
- Genus: Solanecio (Sch.Bip.) Walp.

Synonyms
- Senecio subgen. Solanecio Sch.Bip.

Genus of plants

Solanecio is a genus of African plants in the groundsel tribe within the sunflower family.

The name "Solanecio" is a combination of the names "Solanum" and "Senecio," referring to the purported resemblance the species have to both of these established genera. Resemblance to Solanum is, of course, superficial.

Species

- Solanecio angulatus
- Solanecio biafrae
- Solanecio buchwaldii
- Solanecio cydoniifolius
- Solanecio epidendricus
- Solanecio gigas
- Solanecio goetzei
- Solanecio gymnocarpus
- Solanecio gynuroides
- Solanecio harennensis
- Solanecio kanzibiensis
- Solanecio lainzii
- Solanecio mannii
- Solanecio mirabilis
- Solanecio nandensis
- Solanecio tuberosus
