= Abigail O'Brien =

Irish multimedia artist

Abigail O'Brien DFA (hon. caus.), PRHA
- Born: 1957 (age 68–69); Dublin, Ireland
- Education: National College of Art and Design
- Known for: Photography, sculpture, video, handmade objects, 3D printing, inflatables, sound
- Notable work: With Bread, The Last Supper, Fortitude, Temperance, Prudence, Justice, The Rag Tree Series, Airfix Days, Peter The Painter, Look Who's Coming To Dinner, Love Tokens, The Silk Route Series, Bella
- Style: Contemporary
- Elected: Royal Hibernian Academy

24th Royal Hibernian Academy President
- Incumbent
- Assumed office October 2018
- Preceded by: Mick O'Dea PPRHA
- Board member of: National Gallery of Ireland

Abigail O'Brien, PRHA, (born 1957 in Dublin, Ireland) is a contemporary Irish artist and the first female president of the Royal Hibernian Academy since its establishment in 1823. O'Brien's work explores themes such as ritual, rites of passage, and the domestic realm. O'Brien is best known for her multi-media installations featuring photography, video, sculpture, 3D printing, sound, inflatables, embroidery and handmade objects.

O'Brien has received numerous awards and exhibited her work internationally. Her work is in private and public collections including The Irish Museum of Modern Art (IMMA)(, Dublin, The Caldic Collection, Rotterdam, The Museum of Modern Art, Vienna, The Kuntsmuseum Den Haag, The Netherlands, and The Kriegel Foundation New York. O’Brien lives and works in Ireland.

== Early life and education ==
Born 1957 in Dublin, Ireland, one of four children, O'Brien began her career as an artist as a mature student receiving her education in Ireland's National College of Art and Design. Awarded Student of the Year, O'Brien achieved a BA in Fine Art in 1995 and was later awarded with an MA in Fine Art Painting from The National College of Art and Design, Dublin in 1998.

== Career ==
O'Brien's work, "The Last Supper", from her series on the seven Catholic sacraments, was bought by the Irish Museum of Modern Art for its permanent collection in 1996, just a year after her graduation.

Through much of her work, O'Brien observes perceived gender roles, ritual domesticity and the role of women in society. O'Brien is known for collections of work including With Bread (2013) which examines the role of bread in daily lives and The Seven Sacraments (1996–2004) is a series of works reflecting on the Catholic Sacraments. The Cardinal Virtues - Fortitude (2005), Temperance (2009), Prudence (2017) and Justice (2021) see O'Brien explore the Cardinal Virtues through a contemporary lens. Other noted collections include The Silk Road Series (2015–2016), The Rag Tree Series, Bella (2006–2007), Peter the Painter (2016), Love Tokens (2020), Airfix Days (2012), Salt Fields.

O'Brien's noted individual works include Natural Wax (1995–2017), Bonsai, With Love Cologne, India, Four under Three, Guess Who’s Coming to Dinner, Sic Juro (2011). Collaborations include How to Butterfly a Leg of Lamb (video installation) and Black Sole Bonne Femme, with artist Mary A Kelly, in 1999 and 2002 respectively.

O'Brien has also participated in multiple group exhibitions internationally including in Germany, Austria, Belgium, US, Mexico, Poland, China and the UK.

=== Recognition and the RHA ===
O'Brien has won several awards for her work, including the Arts Council (Ireland) awards in 1996, 1997, 1998, 2014 and 2014, The Solomon Sculpture Prize 2008, Culture Ireland Exhibition Bursary in 2005 /2008, and the Cultural Relations Committee of Ireland Award 2003.

O'Brien was first elected a Full Member of the Royal Hibernian Academy (RHA) in 2010, and elected as secretary of the academy from 2012 until 2017, the first time a female artist had held this position. She secured another "first" when elected as President of the academy for the 2018–2023 term which was extended to 2025. O'Brien held the position of President of the RHA for 7 years. The current President of the RHA is Sinéad Ní Mhaonaigh. As RHA President, O’Brien is also an ex-officio Member of the Board of the National Gallery of Ireland and an honorary member of the Royal Academy of Scotland

In 2019, O'Brien received an honorary Doctorate of Fine Arts from the National University of Ireland as well as the Woman of the Year Award for the Arts area from the Irish Tatler magazine. in recognition of her work in the arts in Ireland.

== Personal life ==
O'Brien is a sister of businessman Denis O'Brien. She lives and works in County Dublin, Ireland, and is married to Hugh Bradley.

== Solo exhibitions ==
- 2021 Justice - Never Enough - Highlanes Gallery Drogheda, Ireland 4 September - 16 October
- 2017 Prudence And The Game Of Golf- RHA Ashford Gallery 17 November – 20 December
- 2013–2015 With Bread, – The Highlanes Gallery, The Dock, Carrick-On-Shannon, Limerick City Gallery, 2015.
- 2012 Airfix Days, – The Peppercanister Gallery, Dublin, October 19 – November 10
- 2009–2011 Temperance – 2009, January 2011 – April 25, 2011, RHA Foyer, Galerie Bugdahn Und Kaimer, Düsseldorf, Letterkenny Municipal Arts Centre, County Donegal, Ireland.
- 2007- 2008 Bella – 2008, Galerie Bugdahn Und Kaimer, Düsseldorf. Rubicon Gallery, Dublin.
- 2005 Fortitude – The John David Mooney Foundation, Chicago.
- 2003 The Seven Sacraments, 1995 – 2004, Haus der Kunst, Munich, Germany.The Kunstverein, Lingen, Germany. The R.H.A., Gallagher Gallery, Dublin, Centre Culture Irlandais, Paris. Gallerie Bugdahn Und Kaimer, Düsseldorf.
- 2001 The Rag Tree Series, Rubicon Gallery, Dublin.Galerie Bugdahn Und Kaimer, Düsseldorf.
- 2000 From The Ophelia Room – Extreme Unction, Galerie Bugdahn Und Kaimer, Düsseldorf.
- 2000 From Baptism, The Sculpture Court, Edinburgh College of Art, Edinburgh.
- 1999 Kitchen Pieces – Confession And Communion, Galerie Stadtpark, Krems, Austria.
- 1998 Kitchen Pieces – Confession and Communion, Galerie Bugdahn Und Kaimer, Düsseldorf.
- 1996 Baptism, Old Museum, Belfast. Häagen Dazs/ Temple Bar Gallery Solo award, Dublin.
- 1996 Man Eating Cream Bun Installation, Habitat, Dublin.
