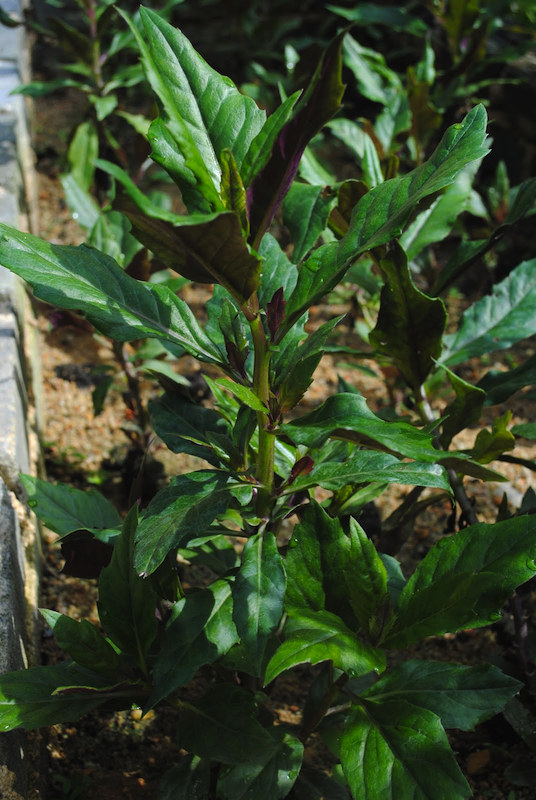
- Hongfeng cai plant

Scientific classification
- Kingdom: Plantae
- Clade: Tracheophytes
- Clade: Angiosperms
- Clade: Eudicots
- Clade: Asterids
- Order: Asterales
- Family: Asteraceae
- Genus: Gynura
- Species: G. bicolor

Binomial name
- Gynura bicolor (Roxb. ex Willd.) DC. 1838

Synonyms
- Cacalia bicolor Roxb. ex Willd.; Gynura angulosa Hance; Senecio bicolor Sch.Bip.; Senecio moluccanus Roxb.

= Gynura bicolor =

Species of flowering plant

Gynura bicolor, also called hongfeng cai (紅鳳菜) in Chinese, suizenjina (水前寺菜) in Japanese, Okinawan spinach or edible gynura, is a member of the chrysanthemum family (Asteraceae). It is native to China, Thailand, and Myanmar but grown in many other places as a vegetable and as a medicinal herb.

There are two kinds: one that is green on both sides, and another with leaves that are green on the top and purple underneath. Both kinds are considered medicinal vegetables. Gynura bicolor is a perennial and therefore found for sale throughout the year, however, winter and spring are the best times to use the plant.

== History ==
G. bicolor has been used as a food and folk medicine for millennia. It was brought into cultivation at the Calcutta Botanic Garden from the Moluccas of eastern Indonesia in 1798.

It was introduced to Japan in the 18th century. In 2010, Gynura bicolor had a shipment volume of 63 tons in Japan.

== Uses ==
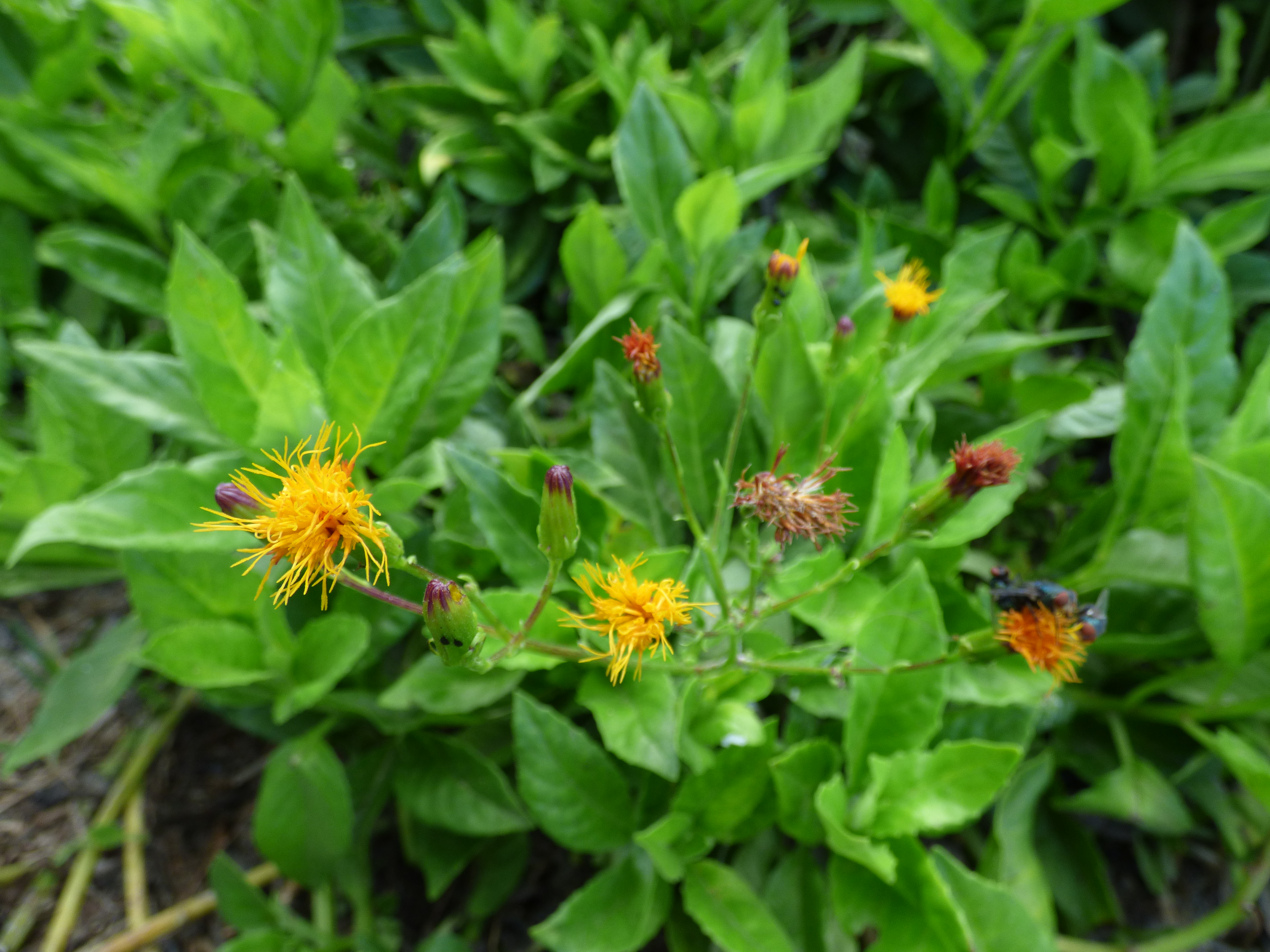
Flowers

Gynura bicolor contains high levels of vitamin C, crude protein, iron, carotenoids, calcium, essential amino acids, and is a rich source of anthocyanins.

According to Chinese food grouping, Gynura bicolor is a 'cool' food, so the leaves are stir-fried with sesame oil and ginger (both 'hotter' foods) to achieve balance. The stems and roots of the plant can also be made into tea. Choose leaves with few bruises and without black stains. In Japan, Gynura bicolor is eaten as local vegetable in Ishikawa, Kumamoto, and Okinawa, blanched lightly and served with ponzu, as an ingredient of miso soup, or tempura.

The roots of the plant have been used for consumption in aviation for their richness in Vitamin K. It has an application to address bone decay in astronauts, increasing the absorption of calcium. It can also help female astronauts during menstruation.

== Propagation ==
Taking cuttings is very easy.

== Toxicity ==
Pyrrolizidine alkaloids, toxic to the human liver, have been discovered in Gynura bicolor tested from five regions in China. No significant genotoxic effects were found. Samples collected from one region, Jiangsu, displayed weak cytotoxicity at the concentration of 100mg/ml, indicating that some caution should be had.

Another study found that the plant generally has a negligible level of toxicity when administered orally and has been labeled safe in experimental rats. The plant was not cytotoxic to the normal cell line and "confirmed the safety of the G. bicolor for consumption." The study also found that the plant had a chemoprevention potential.

Controlled consumption of the plant has been advised to prevent any potential harmful effects from the generally low presence of pyrrolizidine alkaloids.
