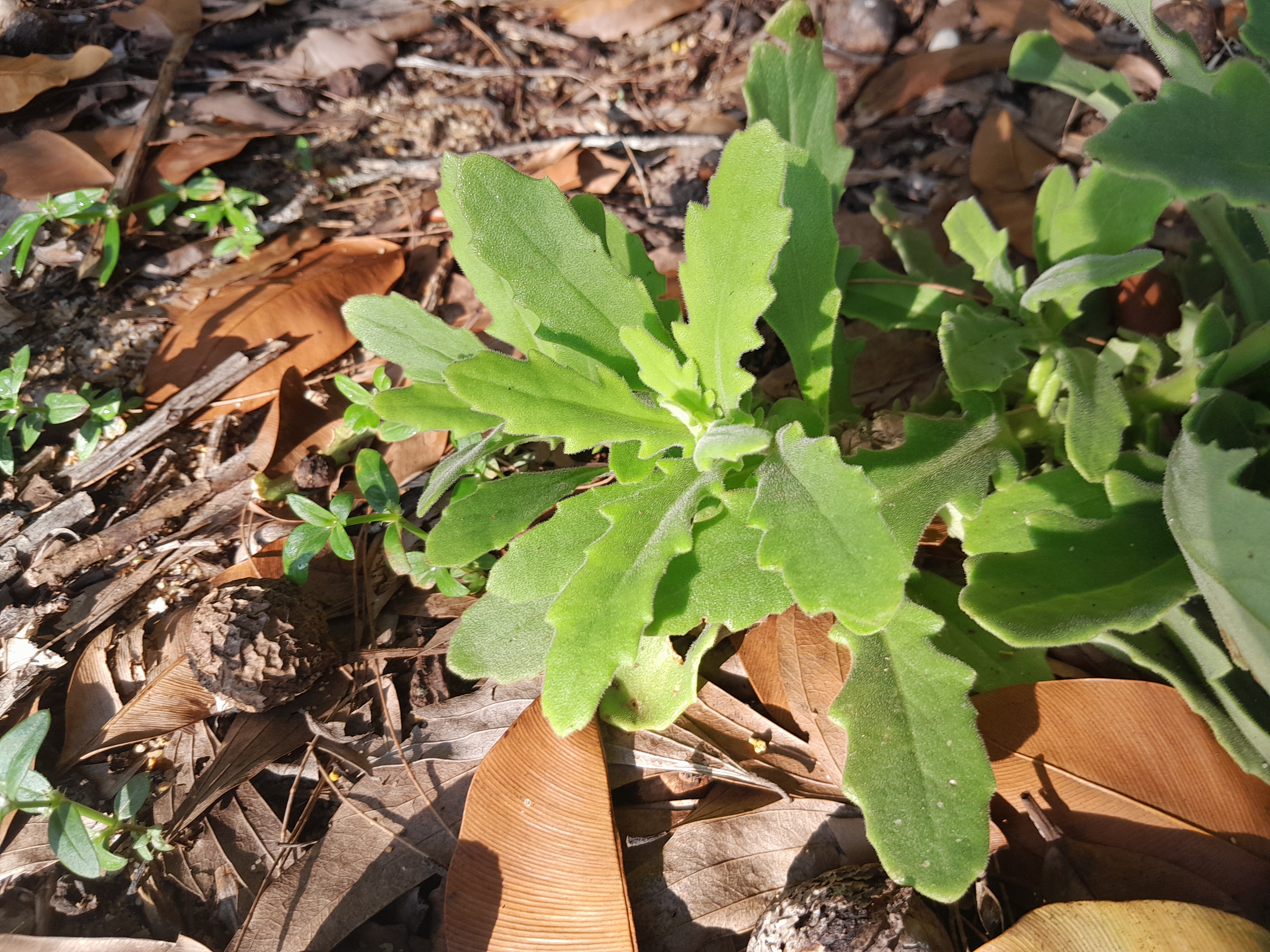

Conservation status
- Least Concern (NCA)

Scientific classification
- Kingdom: Plantae
- Clade: Tracheophytes
- Clade: Angiosperms
- Clade: Eudicots
- Clade: Asterids
- Order: Asterales
- Family: Asteraceae
- Genus: Gynura
- Species: G. drymophila

Binomial name
- Gynura drymophila (F.Muell.) F.G.Davies

Synonyms
- Senecio drymophilus F.Muell.

= Gynura drymophila =

Species of flowering plant

Gynura drymophila is a plant in the family Asteraceae native to eastern New South Wales and Queensland, Australia. It is a herb up to 60 cm (24 in) tall which inhabits a variety of forest types.

== Taxonomy ==
This species was first described by Ferdinand von Mueller in 1858 as Senecio drymophilus, and it was published in the journal Transactions of the Philosophical Institute of Victoria. It was later transferred to the genus Gynura by Frances G. Davies in 1980.

=== Infraspecies ===
Two varieties are recognised by Plants of the World Online as of December 2024:

- G. drymophila var. drymophila
- G. drymophila var. glabrifolia

== Conservation ==
This species is listed as least concern under the Queensland Government's Nature Conservation Act. As of 7 December 2024, it has not been assessed by the International Union for Conservation of Nature (IUCN).
