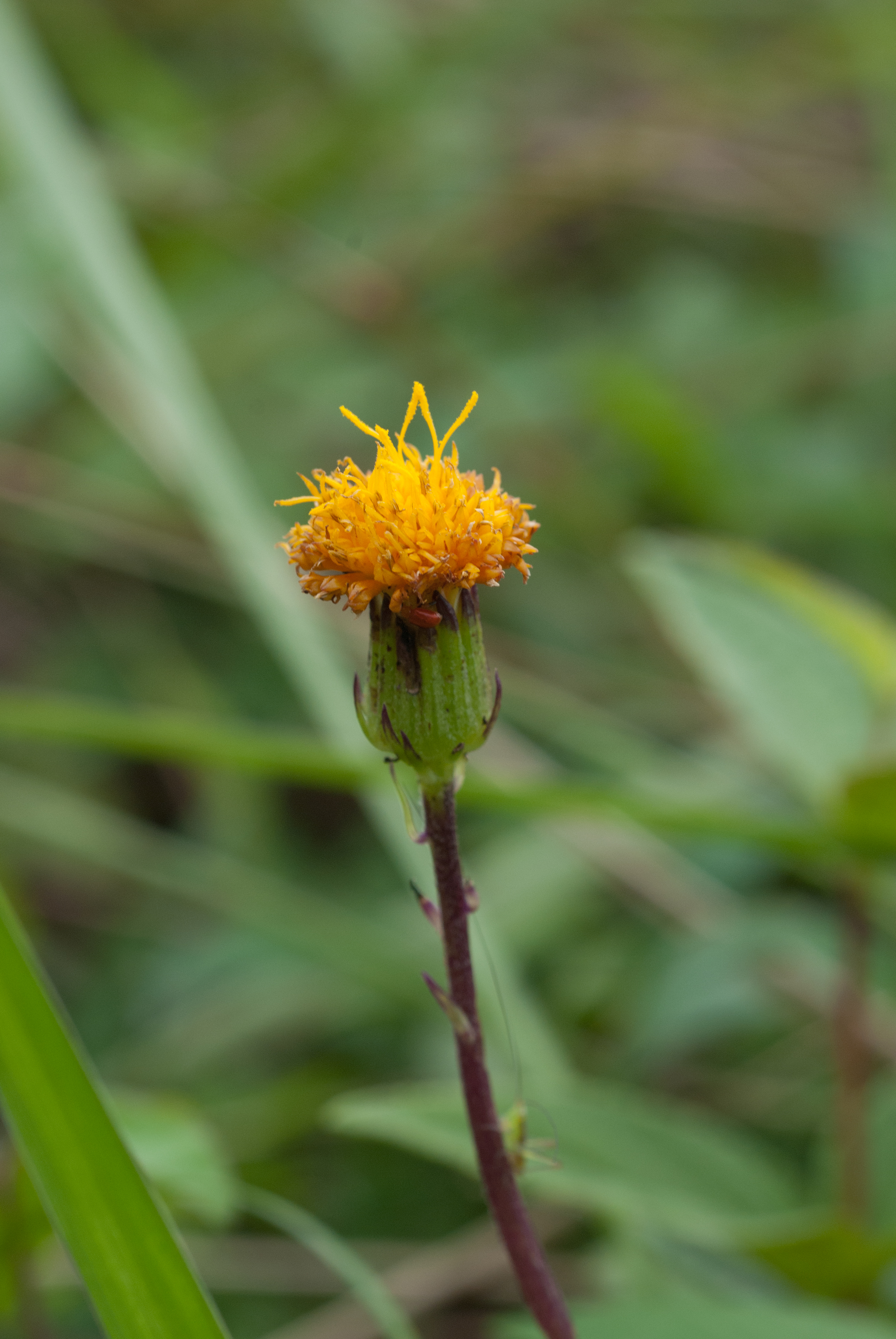
- Inflorescence
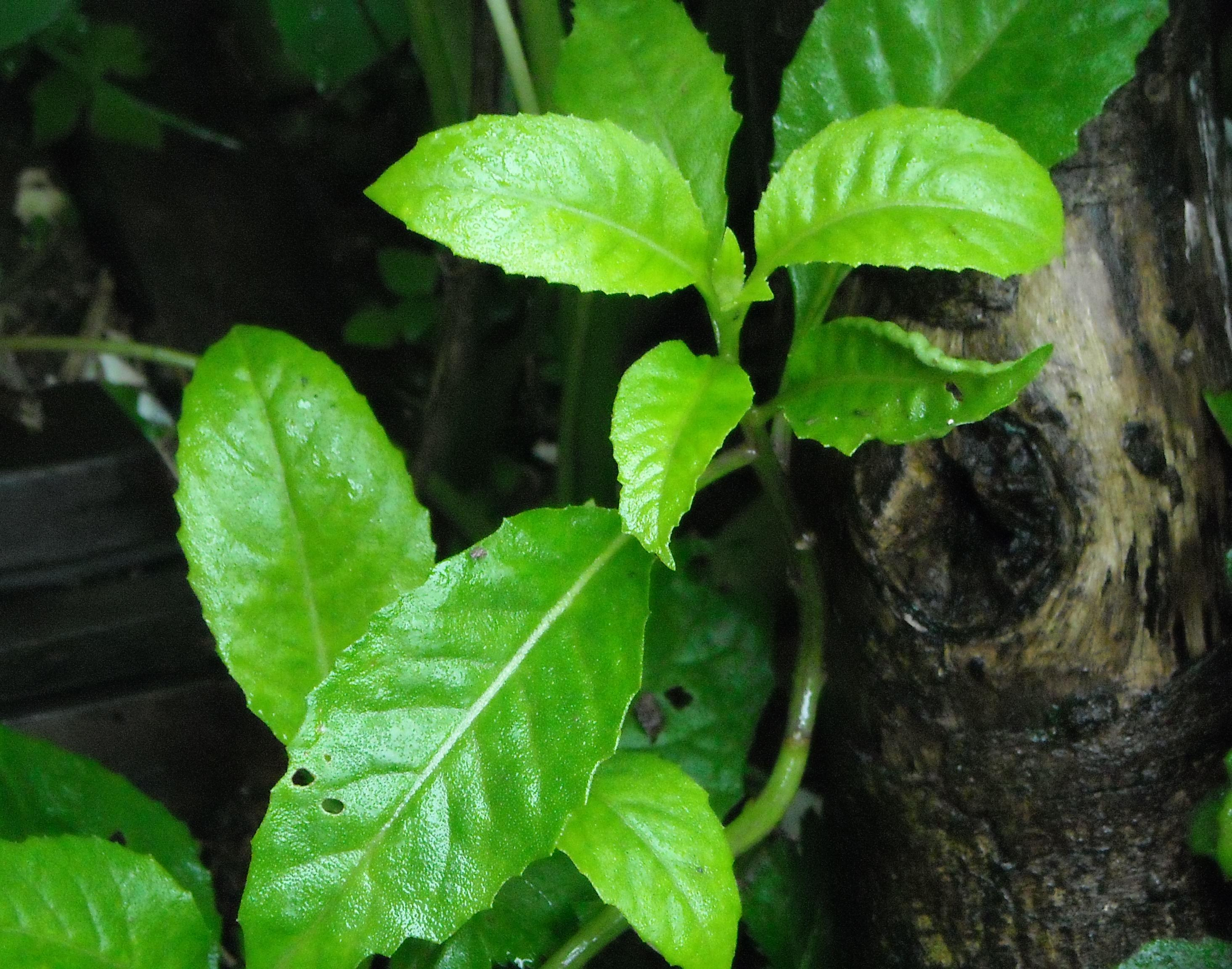
- Leaves

Scientific classification
- Kingdom: Plantae
- Clade: Tracheophytes
- Clade: Angiosperms
- Clade: Eudicots
- Clade: Asterids
- Order: Asterales
- Family: Asteraceae
- Genus: Gynura
- Species: G. formosana

Binomial name
- Gynura formosana Kitam.

Synonyms
- Gynura divaricata subsp. formosana (Kitam.) F.G.Davies

= Gynura formosana =

Species of plant

Gynura formosana is a species of flowering plant in the family Asteraceae, native to Taiwan. A perennial reaching 50 cm (20 in), it is found from the shoreline up to 500 m (1,600 ft), typically in sandy soils. It is a preferred nectar source for the chestnut tiger (Parantica sita).
