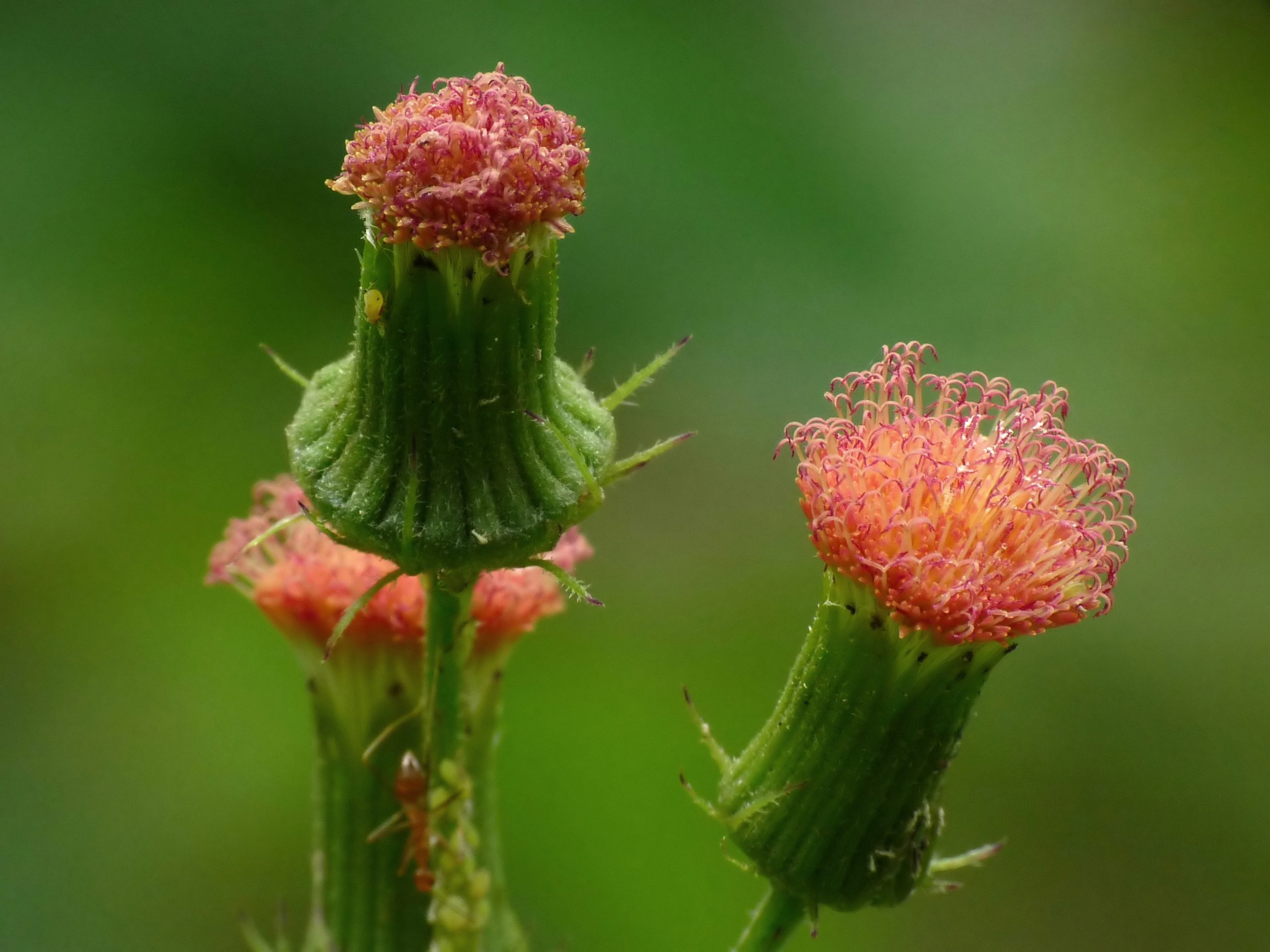

Scientific classification
- Kingdom: Plantae
- Clade: Tracheophytes
- Clade: Angiosperms
- Clade: Eudicots
- Clade: Asterids
- Order: Asterales
- Family: Asteraceae
- Genus: Crassocephalum
- Species: C. crepidioides

Binomial name
- Crassocephalum crepidioides (Benth.) S.Moore 1912

Synonyms
- Gynura crepidioides Benth. 1849; Crassocephalum diversifolium Hiern; Gynura diversifolia Sch.Bip. ex Asch.; Gynura microcephala Vatke; Gynura polycephala Benth.; Senecio crepidioides Asch.; Senecio diversifolius A.Rich. 1848 not Dumort. 1827

= Crassocephalum crepidioides =

Species of flowering plant

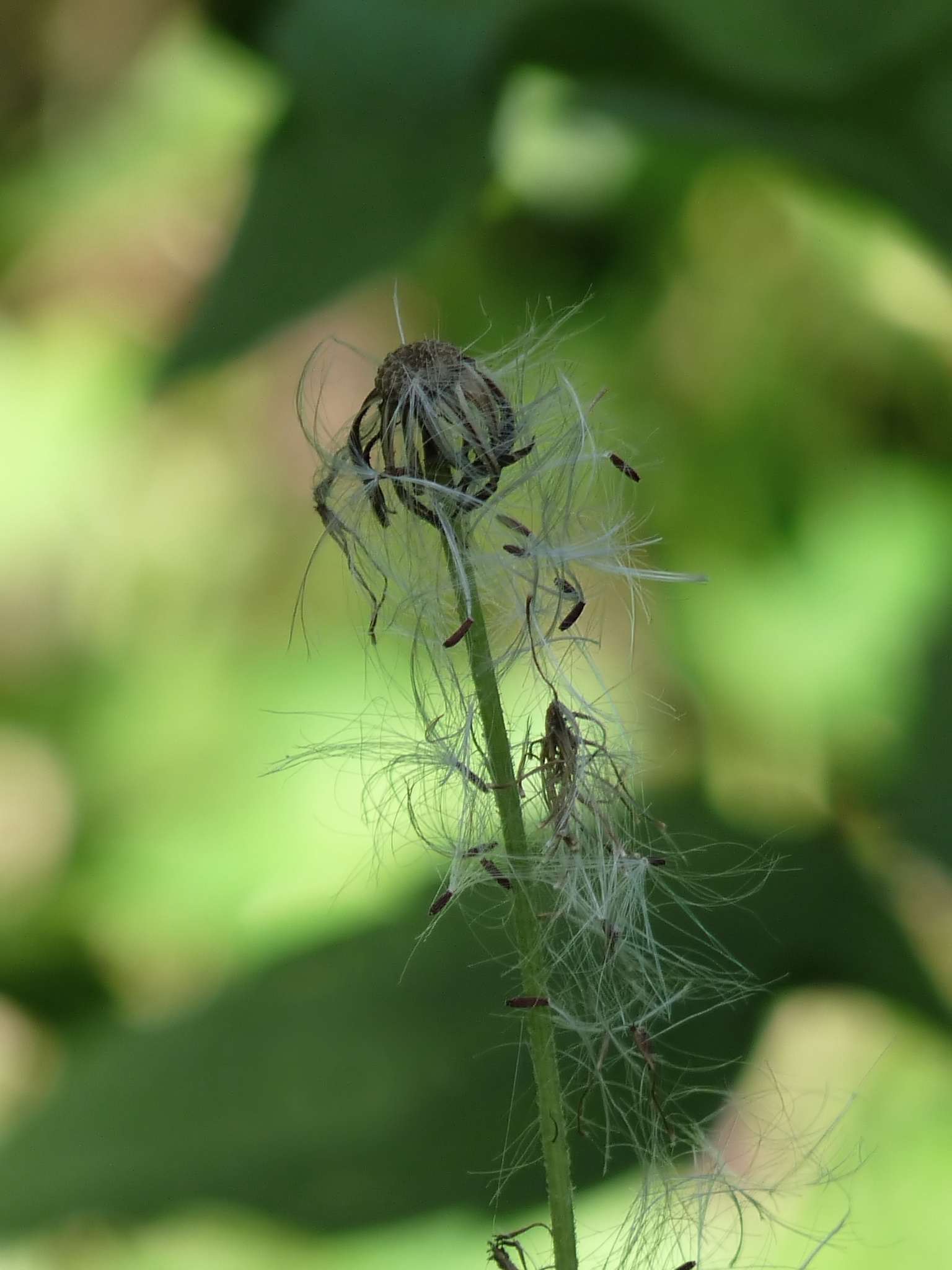
Crassocephalum crepidioides seeds

Crassocephalum crepidioides, also called ebolo, thickhead, redflower ragleaf, or fireweed, is an erect annual slightly succulent herb growing up to 180 cm tall. Its use is widespread in many tropical and subtropical regions, but is especially prominent in tropical Africa. Its fleshy, mucilaginous leaves and stems are eaten as a vegetable, and many parts of the plant have medical uses. However, the safety of internal use needs further research due to the presence of plant toxins.

== Ecology ==
The species is invasive in New Caledonia.

== Toxicity ==
Crassocephalum crepidioides contains the hepatotoxic and tumorigenic pyrrolizidine alkaloid, jacobine. However, in another study, it is shown that the antitumor activity and macrophage nitric oxide produce action.
