= TruthOrFiction.com =

Fact-checking website

- Available in: English
- Creator: Rich Buhler
- Website: www.truthorfiction.com
- Commercial: No
- Launched: 1999

TruthOrFiction.com (also TruthOrFiction.org) is a fact-checking website about urban legends, Internet rumors, and other questionable stories or photographs.

TruthOrFiction.com was founded by Rich Buhler, a journalist, speaker, and author who was also known as the "Father of Modern Christian Talk Radio" at KBRT.

The topics are researched by TruthOrFiction's staff, and rated "Truth" (if true), or "Fiction" (if untrue). When the accuracy is not known with certainty, the stories are rated "Unproven," "Disputed," "Reported to be Truth" or "Reported to be Fiction." Partially true stories are rated "Truth & Fiction," "Truth But Inaccurate Details," or similar.

== Main site ==
TruthOrFiction has been referenced by news media and other online websites such as the Florida Times Union which said that:

TruthorFiction.com was founded in 1999 by the late Rich Buhler... who researched and wrote about urban legends for more than 30 years, according to various media reports. Its staff researches the rumors; original sources are usually listed or linked, so it is a good site to corroborate facts.

== See also ==
- Fact checker
- FactCheck.org
- MythBusters
- PolitiFact
- Snopes.com
- The Straight Dope
