= Velvet (music venue) =

Italian music club

- Interactive map of Velvet
- Address: Via Santa Aquilina, 21; Rimini; Italy
- Coordinates: 44.004996°N 12.537210°E
- Owner: Thomas Balsamini
- Event: Alternative rock

Construction
- Opened: 1989
- Closed: 2016

Website
- http://velvet.it/

The Velvet Club was an alternative music club in Rimini, Italy. The club has hosted many notable bands since its opening in 1989, at that time it was known as Velvet Perestrojka. It was founded by Thomas Balsamini and was the continuation of the Slego which closed in 2000 after 21 years of existence.

== Some past concerts ==
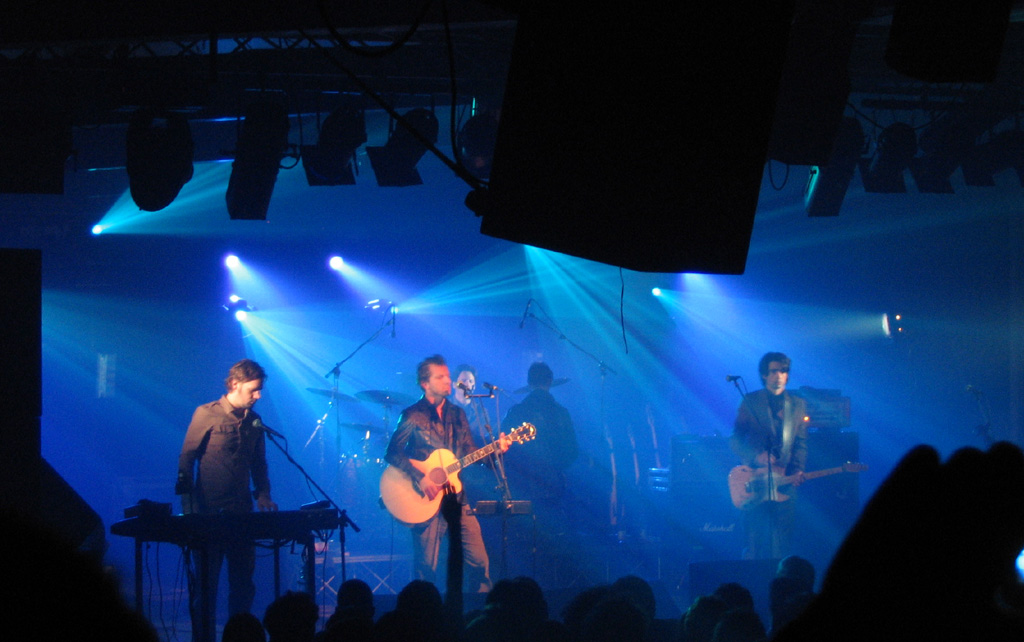
dEUS live in 2006.

- The Alan Parsons Project
- Asian Dub Foundation
- Bad Religion
- Bandabardò
- Baustelle
- Belle and Sebastian
- Black Rebel Motorcycle Club
- Bloc Party
- Cornelius
- Ice Cube
- The Cult
- dEUS
- The Dandy Warhols
- Donatella Rettore
- Dream Theater
- The Dresden Dolls
- Dropkick Murphys
- Editors
- Flaming Lips
- Giardini di Mirò
- The Hives
- Interpol
- Jamiroquai
- Jethro Tull
- Joe Satriani
- Julie's Haircut
- Kaiser Chiefs
- Keane
- Lacuna Coil
- Massimo Volume
- Melvins
- Mogwai
- Motorpsycho
- Muse
- Napalm Death
- Nirvana
- Paul Weller
- Ramones
- DJ Shadow
- Shellac
- Skiantos
- Stereolab
- Stranglers
- Subsonica
- Sud Sound System
- Supergrass
- Tito & Tarantula
- Tricky
- Verdena
- Uzeda
- Wire
- Yo La Tengo
- Youssou N'Dour
- ZU

== Bibliography ==
- Elisa Genghini, 101 cose da fare in Romagna, Roma, Newton Compton, 2009. ISBN 978-88-541-1504-0
- Arturo Compagnoni, Italia '80. Il Rock indipendente italiano negli anni Ottanta
