= Velvet, Washington =

Unincorporated community in Washington, United States

- Unincorporated community
- Location within Washington (state)
- Coordinates: 48°59′10″N 117°49′37″W
- Country: United States
- State: Washington
- County: Stevens
- Elevation: 2,120 ft (650 m)
- Time zone: UTC-8 (Pacific (PST))
  - Summer (DST): UTC-7 (PDT)
- ZIP code: 99157
- Area code: 509
- GNIS feature ID: 1531162

Velvet is an unincorporated community in Stevens County, in the U.S. state of Washington. It is located on Washington State Route 25 just south of the Canadian border.

== History ==
A post office called Velvet was established in 1912 and closed in 1920. The community took its name from nearby Velvet Mine.
