= Aergo Capital =

Aircraft leasing company

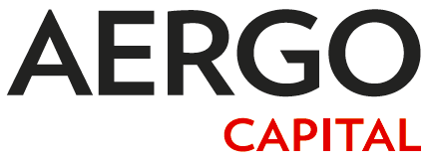
Aergo Capital logo

Aergo Capital Limited is an Irish aircraft leasing and trading company which was founded in 1999. Originally formed by Denis O'Brien and Fred Browne, in October 2014 Aergo Capital partnered with CarVal Investors and is now under the ownership of funds managed by Carval Investors.

By late 2014, Aergo had reportedly "traded more than 150 aircraft" with over 50 airlines. As of 2017, these airlines included Ethiopian Airlines, South African Airways, Jet Airways in India and Lion Air in Indonesia. As of November 2016, Aergo had a fleet of 30 aircraft. In November 2022, an article in the Irish Independent suggested that the company had acquired Seraph Aviation, bringing its fleet "to more than 300 aircraft". The company's website lists aircraft including ATR 72s, Boeing 737s, Airbus A320s and Airbus A330s.

The company, which is headquartered in Dublin, was reportedly involved in a legal action with Air Italy in late 2008.
