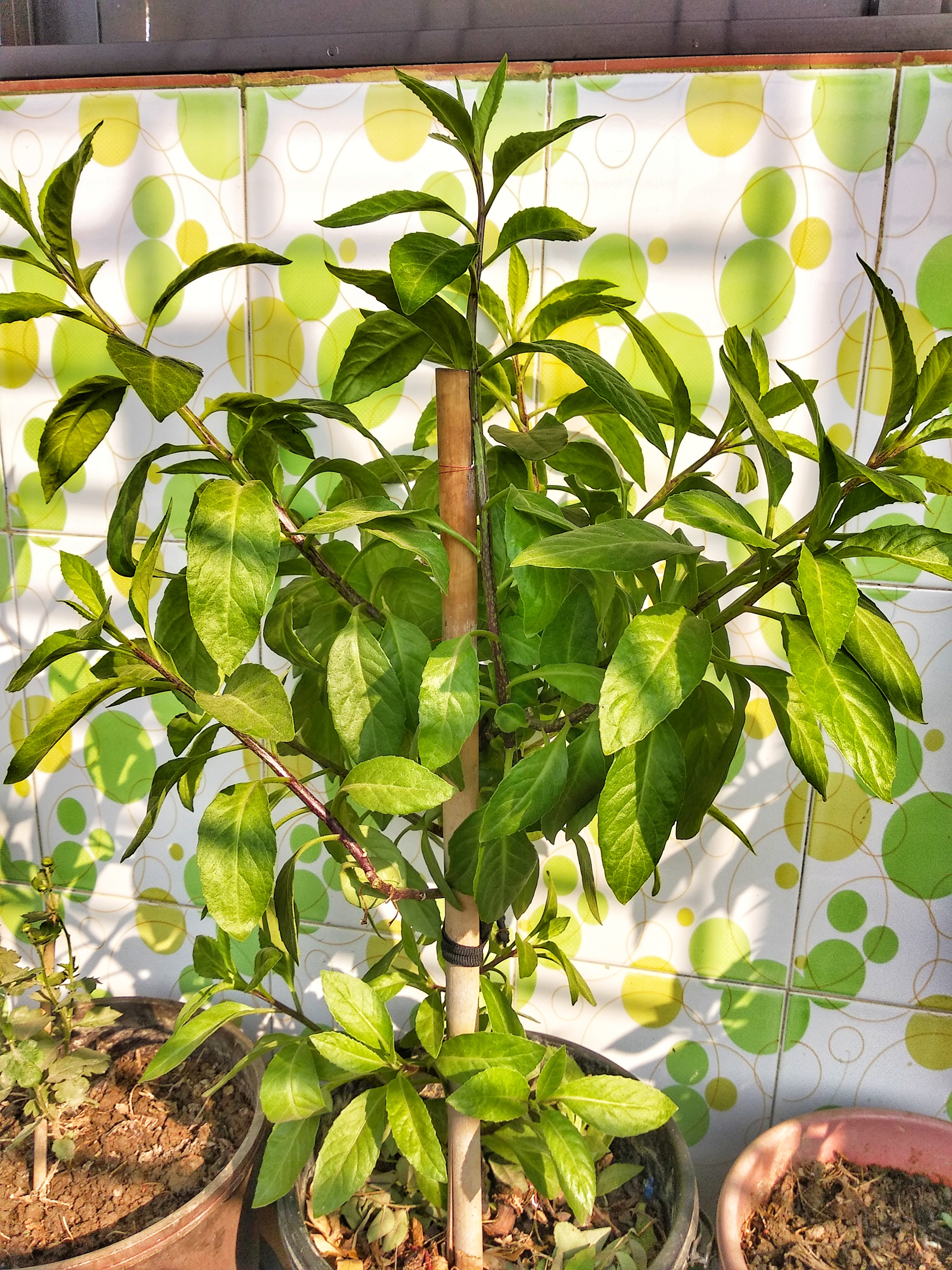

Scientific classification
- Kingdom: Plantae
- Clade: Tracheophytes
- Clade: Angiosperms
- Clade: Eudicots
- Clade: Asterids
- Order: Asterales
- Family: Asteraceae
- Genus: Gynura
- Species: G. procumbens

Binomial name
- Gynura procumbens (Lour.) Merr. 1923

Synonyms
- List: Cacalia procumbens Lour.; Cacalia cylindriflora Wall.; Cacalia finlaysoniana Wall.; Cacalia reclinata Wall.; Cacalia sarmentosa Blume; Cacalia sarracenia Blanco; Crassocephalum latifolium S.Moore; Crassocephalum pubigerum Kuntze; Gynura affinis Turcz.; Gynura agusanensis Elmer; Gynura buntingii S.Moore; Gynura cavaleriei H.Lév.; Gynura clementis Merr.; Gynura emeiensis Z.Y.Zhu; Gynura finlaysoniana DC.; Gynura latifolia Elmer; Gynura lobbiana Turcz.; Gynura piperi Merr.; Gynura pubigera Bold.; Gynura sarmentosa (Blume) DC.; Gynura scabra Turcz.; Senecio cacaliaster Blanco; Senecio finlaysonianus Sch.Bip.; Senecio mindoroensis Elmer; Senecio sarmentosus (Blume) Sch.Bip.

= Gynura procumbens =

Species of flowering plant

Gynura procumbens is a species of flowering plant in the family Asteraceae. It is sometimes referred to by the common names sabuñgai, sambung nyawa, longevity spinach, or longevity greens. It is an edible vine that is native to Bangladesh, Benin, Borneo, Cambodia, the Central African Republic, China, the Democratic Republic of Congo, Gabon, Guinea, Indonesia, Ivory Coast, Java, Liberia, Malaysia, New Guinea, Nigeria, the Philippines, Thailand, and Vietnam.

Its leaves are ovate-elliptic or lanceolate, 3.5 to 8 centimetres (1 1/3 to 3 1/6 in) long, and 0.8 to 3.5 centimetres (1/3 to 1 1/3 in) wide. Flowering heads are panicled, narrow, yellow, and 1 to 1.5 centimetres (1/3 to 2/3 in) long. The plant grows wild but is also cultivated as a vegetable or medicinal plant. Its young leaves are used for cooking, such as with meat and prawns in a soup.
