= Solanecio mannii =

Scientific classification
- Kingdom: Plantae
- Clade: Tracheophytes
- Clade: Angiosperms
- Clade: Eudicots
- Clade: Asterids
- Order: Asterales
- Family: Asteraceae
- Genus: Solanecio
- Species: S. mannii

Binomial name
- Solanecio mannii (Hook.f.) C.Jeffrey

Species of flowering plant

Solanecio mannii, also called Gynura mannii, of the daisy family (Asteraceae) is a tree native to seasonally dry tropical areas of Africa from Ethiopia to Mozambique. It grows up to 26 ft (7.9 m) in height. It has very large leaves, up to 30 in (760 mm) in length, and of oblanceolate form. The flowers are yellow daisies in a terminal inflorescence. The stems are mostly purple.
