= Crassocephalum biafrae =

Scientific classification
- Kingdom: Plantae
- Clade: Tracheophytes
- Clade: Angiosperms
- Clade: Eudicots
- Clade: Asterids
- Order: Asterales
- Family: Asteraceae
- Genus: Crassocephalum
- Species: C. biafrae

Binomial name
- Crassocephalum biafrae S.Moore

Species of flowering plant

Crassocephalum biafrae, also called Sierra Leone bologi or worow, is a shade tolerant perennial vine grown especially in Sierra Leone, often on trellises. Its spinach-like leaves are often eaten steamed.
