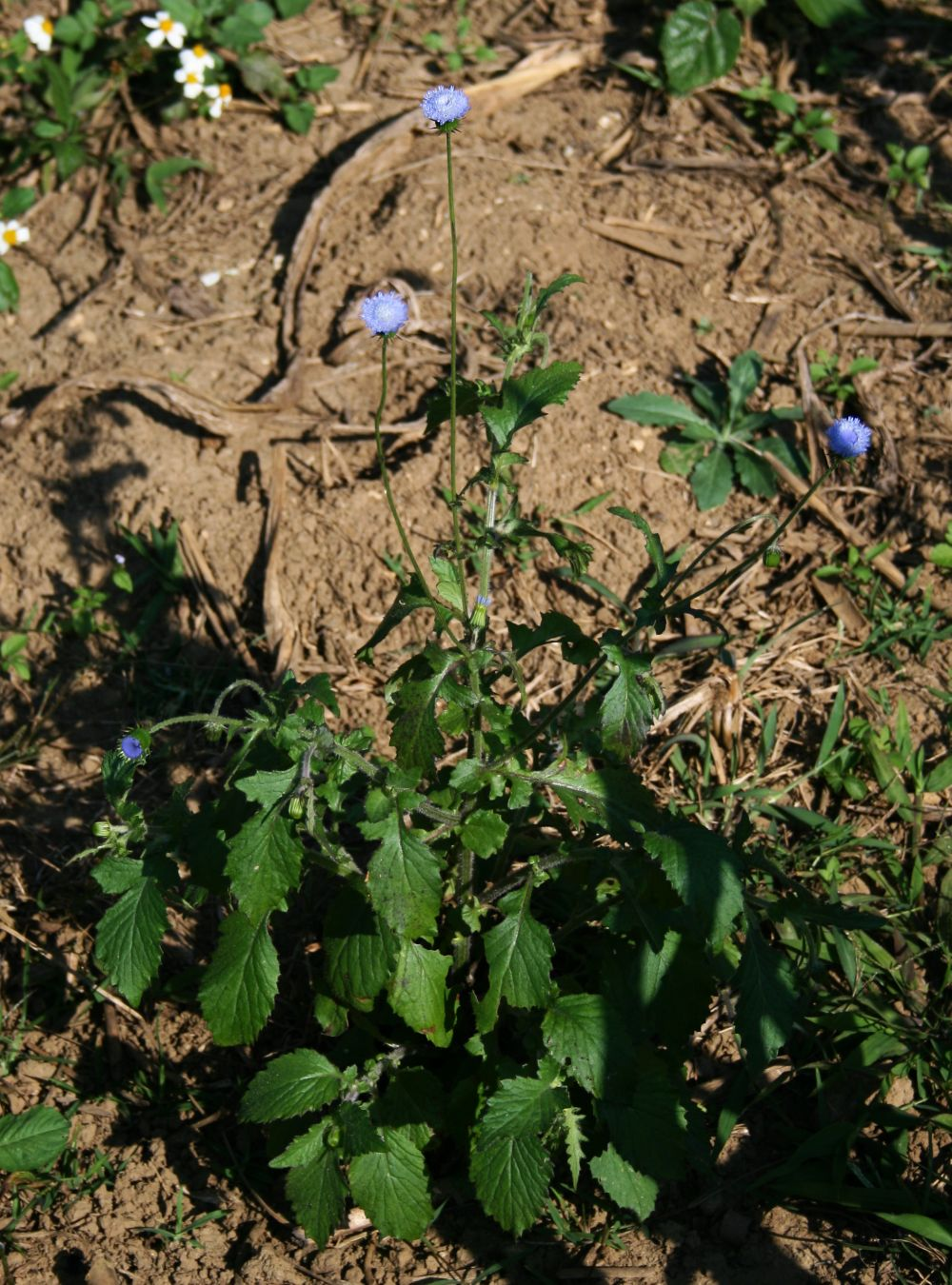

Scientific classification
- Kingdom: Plantae
- Clade: Tracheophytes
- Clade: Angiosperms
- Clade: Eudicots
- Clade: Asterids
- Order: Asterales
- Family: Asteraceae
- Genus: Crassocephalum
- Species: C. rubens

Binomial name
- Crassocephalum rubens (Juss. ex Jacq.) S.Moore

= Crassocephalum rubens =

Species of flowering plant

Crassocephalum rubens, also called Yoruba bologi, is an erect annual herb growing up to 80 cm tall. It is grown and consumed especially in Southwestern Nigeria, but also as far away as Yemen, South Africa, and islands of the Indian Ocean. Its mucilaginous leaves are used as a dry or fresh vegetable in a variety of dishes, and as medicine for several different ailments.
