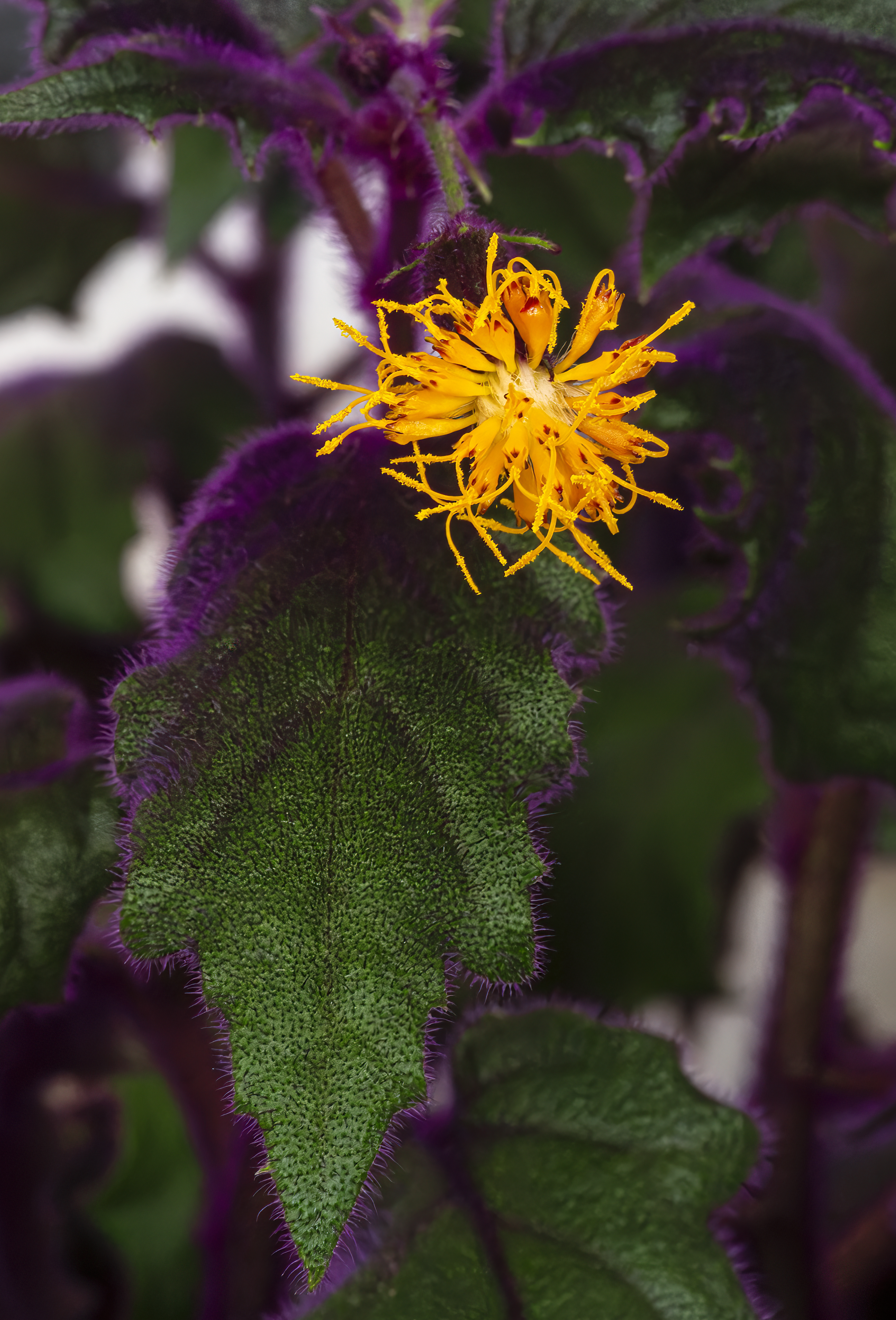
- Flowering Gynura aurantiaca specimen in cultivation
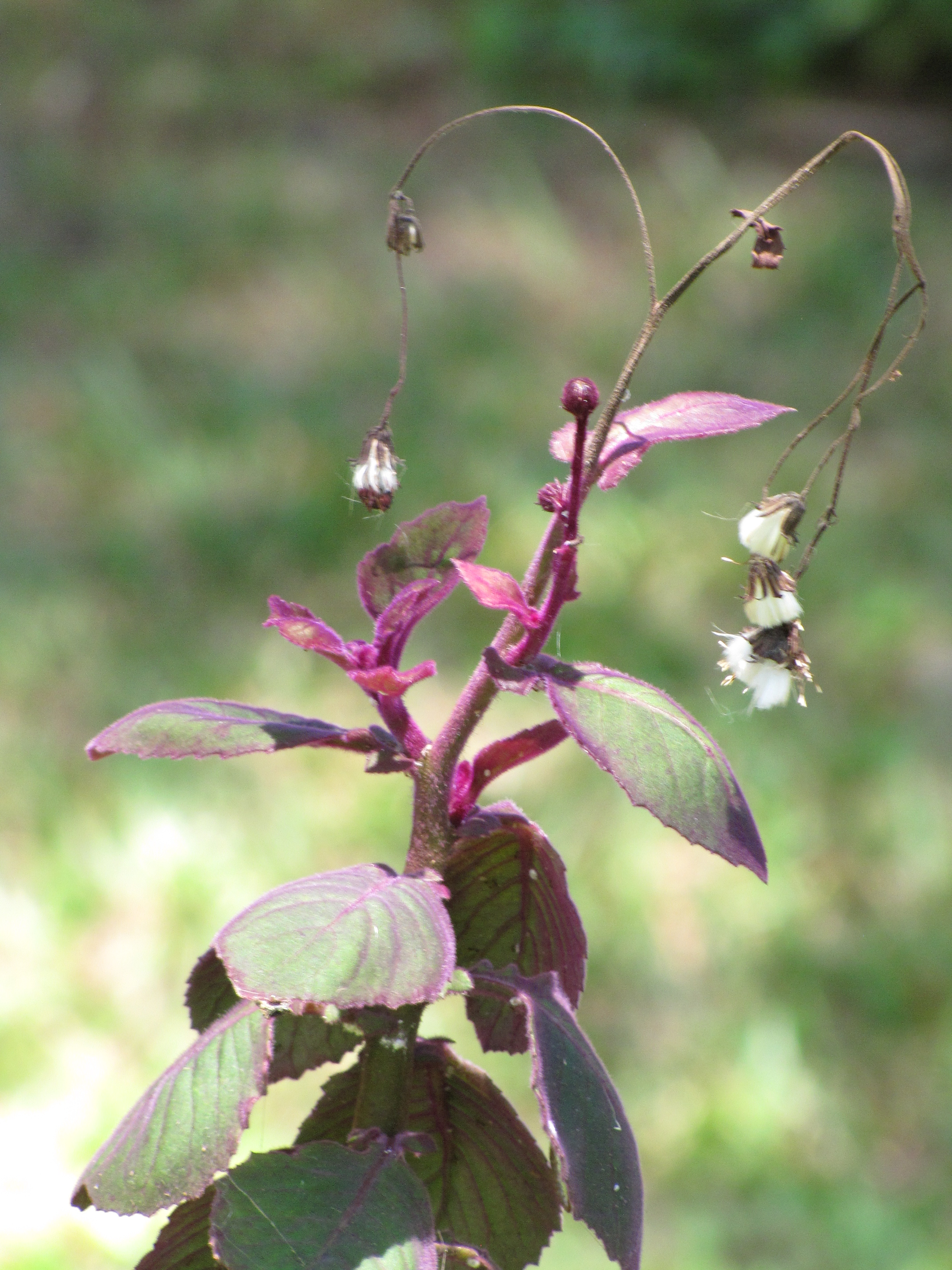
- Gynura aurantiaca specimen with several infructescences

Scientific classification
- Kingdom: Plantae
- Clade: Embryophytes
- Clade: Tracheophytes
- Clade: Spermatophytes
- Clade: Angiosperms
- Clade: Eudicots
- Clade: Asterids
- Order: Asterales
- Family: Asteraceae
- Genus: Gynura
- Species: G. aurantiaca

Binomial name
- Gynura aurantiaca (Blume) DC. 1838, not Benth. 1849

Synonyms
- Synonymy: Cacalia aurantiaca Blume 1826; Crassocephalum aurantiacum (Blume) Kuntze; Crassocephalum teysmannianum Kuntze; Gynura ajakensis Hochr.; Gynura densiflora Miq.; Gynura dichotoma Turcz.; Gynura lyrata Sch.Bip.; Gynura mollis Sch.Bip.; Gynura sumatrana Miq.; Senecio zollingerianus Sch.Bip.

= Gynura aurantiaca =

Species of flowering plant

Gynura aurantiaca, called purple passion or velvet plant, is a species of flowering plant in the daisy family Asteraceae. It is native to Southeast Asia but grown in many other places as a house plant. In warm regions, it is frequently grown outdoors on patios and in gardens rather than inside buildings, and hence it has escaped into the wild in Africa, Australia, South America, Mesoamerica, Florida, and a few other places.

== Description ==
Gynura aurantiaca is an evergreen perennial growing to 30 cm (12 in) tall, the stems sometimes growing straight up but other times reclining against other objects, when stems can reach 2 m (6.6 ft). As a house plant, the long trailing vines are appropriate for a hanging pot or similar arrangement. Leaves, stems, and bracts are dark green, covered with soft purple hairs that impart a velvety feeling to the plant. One plant can produce 1-5 flower heads, each on its own flower stalk. The flowers have a rather strong odour. Each head contains several yellow, orange, or red disc flowers but no ray flowers.

== Etymology ==
The Latin specific epithet aurantiaca means "orange", referring to the usual colour of the blooms.

== Horticulture ==
In cultivation in the UK this plant has gained the Royal Horticultural Society's Award of Garden Merit.
