= Everlasting =

Everlasting may refer to:

- Everlasting life, the concept of physical or spiritual immortality

== Plants ==
Everlastings (or everlasting daisies, or paper daisies), species in a group of genera in the family Asteraceae, including;

- Antennaria (North America and other northern hemisphere areas)
- Chrysocephalum (Australia)
- Coronidium (Australia)
- Edmondia (South Africa)
- Gamochaeta (North and South America)
- Helichrysum (Africa, Madagascar, Australasia and Eurasia)
- Ozothamnus (Australia)
- Phaenocoma (South Africa)
- Rhodanthe (Australia)
- Syncarpha (South Africa)
- Xeranthemum (Southern Europe)
- Xerochrysum (Australia)

Plants in the genus Limonium (family Plumbaginaceae), in particular Limonium perezii, are referred to as everlastings in South Africa.

== Music ==
=== Albums ===
- Everlasting (Every Little Thing album), 1997
- Everlasting, a 2006 instrumental work by Robin Guthrie
- Everlasting (Natalie Cole album), 1987, or the title song
- Everlasting (Martina McBride album), 2014
- Everlasting (EP), a 1994 EP by Refused

=== Songs ===
- "The Everlasting" (song), a 1998 single by Manic Street Preachers
- "Everlasting" (BoA song), a 2006 single by BoA
- "Everlasting", a 1984 song by Survivor from the album Vital Signs
- "Everlasting", a 2003 song by The Haunted from the album One Kill Wonder
- "Everlasting", a 2007 song by Galneryus from the album One for All – All for One
- "Everlasting", a 2012 song by Matt Brouwer from the album Till the Sunrise

=== Others ===
- Everlasting, the official fan club of the South Korean pop girl group Brown Eyed Girls
- The Everlasting (role-playing game), a role-playing game
- The Everlasting (novel), a 2025 novel
- Everlasting, the fictional TV series that is the subject of Unreal (TV series)
- Everlasting (film), a 2016 suspense film by Anthony Stabley
- Everlasting (food), a Filipino pork meatloaf

== See also ==
- Everlast (disambiguation)
