= No Future =

No Future may refer to:

- "No Future", demo version title, and final version chorus chant from Sex Pistols' "God Save the Queen"
- No Future (novel), a Doctor Who novel, referencing the Sex Pistols song
- No Future (album), a 2020 album by Eden
- No-Future, a music label, website and online community managed by Cristian Vogel
- "No Future", song by B.o.B.
- "No Future: Queer Theory and the Death Drive", a non-fiction book by Lee Edelman
- No Future (film), a 2021 film starring Catherine Keener
- "No Future" (Casualty), a 1986 television episode

== See also ==
- "No Future for You", a story arc in the Buffy the Vampire Slayer comic books
- No Future in the Past (disambiguation), several songs
