= Omartian =

Omartian is an Armenian surname. Notable people with the surname include:

- Michael Omartian (born 1945), American musician
- Paige Omartian (born 1990), American singer-songwriter
- Stormie Omartian (born 1942), American writer, wife of Michael
