= Wake Up =

Wake Up or wake up is to awake. It may also refer to:

== Music ==
=== Albums ===
- Wake Up (Anthony Neely album) or the title song, 2012
- Wake Up! (The Boo Radleys album), 1995
- Wake Up (BTS album) or the title song, 2014
- Wake Up! (Hazel English album) or the title song, 2020
- Wake Up (Jessica Andersson album) or the title song, 2009
- Wake Up! (John Legend and the Roots album), 2010
- Wake Up (Paige Armstrong album) or the title song, 2009
- Wake Up! (Pope Francis album), 2015
- Wake Up (Shalamar album) or the title song, 1990
- Wake Up (Swoope album), 2012
- Wake Up (The Vamps album) or the title song (see below), 2015
- Wake Up (Youngblood Hawke album), 2013
- Wake Up, by Roy Ayers, 1992

=== EPs ===
- Wake Up (Sway EP), 2013
- Wake Up, by Danyew, 2009
- Wake Up, by the Headlines, 2011
- Wake Up, by Karyn Williams, 2011
- Wake Up, by Open Space, 2007
- Wake Up, by Posthuman, 2018
- Wake Up, by Tikkle Me, 2010
- The Wake Up, by Trinidad James, 2015

=== Songs ===
- "Wake Up" (Arcade Fire song), 2005
- "Wake Up" (Brand Nubian song), 1990
- "Wake Up" (ClariS song), 2012
- "Wake Up" (Eliot song), 2019
- "Wake Up" (Eskimo Joe song), 2001
- "Wake Up" (Fetty Wap song), 2016
- "Wake Up" (Hilary Duff song), 2005
- "Wake Up" (Imagine Dragons song), 2024
- "Wake Up" (The Living End song), 2006
- "Wake Up" (Rage Against the Machine song), 1992
- "Wake Up!" (Ski Mask the Slump God & Juice WRLD song), 2024
- "Wake Up" (SkyLar Blatt song), 2024
- "Wake Up" (Suicide Silence song), 2009
- "Wake Up" (Three Days Grace song), 2003
- "Wake Up!" (Tokyo Ska Paradise Orchestra song), 2014
- "Wake Up" (Travis Scott song), 2019
- "Wake Up" (The Vamps song), 2015
- "Wake Up" (XTC song), 1984
- "Wake Up!" (Zivert song), 2022
- "Wake Up (Make a Move)", by Lostprophets, 2004
- "Wake Up (Next to You)", by Graham Parker, 1982
- "Wake Up", by Aaradhna from Treble & Reverb, 2012
- "Wake Up", by Alanis Morissette from Jagged Little Pill, 1995
- "Wake Up!!!", by Aldo Nova from Nova's Dream, 1997
- "Wake Up", by Alicia Keys from The Diary of Alicia Keys, 2003
- "Wake Up", by American Hi-Fi from Blood & Lemonade, 2014
- "Wake Up", by Aphrodite's Child from It's Five O'Clock, 1970
- "Wake Up", by Ateez from The World EP.2: Outlaw, 2023
- "Wake Up", by Avant from The Letter, 2010
- "Wake Up", by Awolnation from Megalithic Symphony, 2011
- "Wake Up", by Backxwash from Only Dust Remains, 2025
- "Wake Up", by Black Veil Brides from Vale, 2018
- "Wake Up", by Breed 77 from Insects, 2009
- "Wake Up", by the Browning from OMNI, 2024
- "Wake Up" (The Chambers Brothers song), from Love, Peace and Happiness, 1969
- "Wake Up", by the Charlatans from Wonderland, 2001
- "Wake Up", by Chicane from The Best of Chicane: 1996–2008, 2008
- "Wake Up!", by Close Your Eyes from We Will Overcome, 2010
- "Wake Up", by CNBLUE from Code Name Blue, 2012
- "Wake Up", by Coheed and Cambria from Good Apollo, I'm Burning Star IV, Volume One: From Fear Through the Eyes of Madness, 2005
- "Wake Up", by Craig David from Commitment, 2025
- "Wake Up", by Damageplan from New Found Power, 2004
- "Wake Up", by D1ce, 2019
- "Wake Up!", by the Doors, a poem from the song "Celebration of the Lizard", 1970
- "Wake Up", by Dope from Felons and Revolutionaries, 1999
- "Wake Up", by Dr. Dog from Easy Beat, 2005
- "Wake Up", by Earshot from Letting Go, 2002
- "Wake Up", by EDEN from End Credits, 2015
- "Wake Up", by Emigrate from Emigrate, 2007
- "Wake Up", by Enuff Z'Nuff from 10, 2000
- "Wake Up", by Fergie from The Dutchess, 2006
- "Wake Up", by Framing Hanley from A Promise to Burn, 2010
- "Wake Up", by From Ashes to New from The Future, 2018
- "Wake Up", by Funkadelic from America Eats Its Young, 1972
- "Wake Up", by Girls' Generation from Hoot, 2010
- "Wake Up", by Gob from Muertos Vivos, 2007
- "Wake Up", by Hanson from the film soundtrack The Princess Diaries, 2001
- "Wake Up", by Hooverphonic from No More Sweet Music, 2005
- "Wake Up!" by James Marriott, 2021
- "Wake Up", by Kayzo and RIOT, 2017
- "Wake Up", by KJ-52 from The Yearbook, 2007
- "Wake Up", by Korn from Issues, 1999
- "Wake Up", by Lil Xan from Total Xanarchy, 2018
- "Wake Up", by Love and Rockets from Love and Rockets, 1989
- "Wake Up", by Mad Season from Above, 1995
- "Wake Up", by Merle Haggard from The Way I Am, 1980
- "Wake Up", by Metro Station from Savior, 2015
- "Wake Up", by Missy Elliott from This Is Not a Test!, 2003
- "Wake Up", by Mr. Big from Actual Size, 2001
- "Wake Up", by the Neville Brothers from Yellow Moon, 1989
- "Wake Up", by NF from Mansion, 2015
- "Wake Up", by Now United, 2020
- "Wake Up", by Of Mice & Men from Another Miracle, 2025
- "Wake Up", by Oingo Boingo from Good for Your Soul, 1983
- "Wake Up", by Pennywise from the compilation Punk-O-Rama III, 1998
- "Wake Up", by Pepper, 2010
- "Wake Up", by Petit Biscuit, 2018
- "Wake Up", by Pure Essence, 1976
- "Wake Up", by Ringo Starr from Stop and Smell the Roses, 1981
- "Wake Up", by Robots in Disguise, 2010
- "Wake Up", by Run–D.M.C. from Run–D.M.C., 1984
- "Wake Up", by Saga from Sagacity, 2014
- "Wake Up", by Sarah Slean from Day One, 2004
- "Wake Up", by Shakthisree Gopalan, 2019
- "Wake Up", by Sibel Redžep, 2011
- "Wake Up", by Skegss, 2020
- "Wake Up", by Slapshock from Project 11-41, 2002
- "Wake Up", by Sliimy from Paint Your Face, 2009
- "Wake Up", by SOiL from Whole, 2013
- "Wake Up", by Story of the Year from The Black Swan, 2008
- "Wake Up", by Teddy Thompson from Teddy Thompson, 2000
- "Wake Up", by Thrice from To Be Everywhere Is to Be Nowhere, 2016
- "Wake Up", by Tim Armstrong from A Poet's Life, 2007
- "Wake Up", by Two Door Cinema Club from Beacon, 2012
- "Wake Up", by the Verve Pipe from A Family Album, 2009
- "Wake Up", by the Walkmen from Everyone Who Pretended to Like Me Is Gone, 2002
- "Wake Up", by Wolves at the Gate from VxV, 2014
- "Wake Up", by Woody Guthrie from Nursery Days, 1951
- "Wake Up", by Yoko Ono from It's Alright (I See Rainbows), 1982
- "Wake Up", by Z-Ro from King of da Ghetto, 2001
- "Wake Up (Set Your Sights)", by Uriah Heep from ...Very 'Eavy ...Very 'Umble, 1970
- "Wake Up (The Sleeping Giant)", by Twisted Sister from Love Is for Suckers, 1987

=== Other uses in music ===
- Wake Up, a musical by Rainhard Fendrich and Harold Faltermeyer

== Television ==
=== Series ===
- Wake Up (Albanian TV program), a weekday morning TV and radio program
- Wake Up (Australian TV program), a 2013–2014 breakfast show
- Wake Up (TV series), a 2015 Taiwanese medical drama series

=== Episodes ===
- "Wake Up" (Adventure Time), 2014
- "Wake Up" (Agents of S.H.I.E.L.D.), 2017
- "Wake Up" (Supergirl), 2017
- "Wake-Up" (Teletubbies), 1997

== See also ==
- Wake-up robot problem, a situation where a robot must localize itself without prior knowledge
- Wake (disambiguation)
- "Wake It Up", a 2008 song by E-40
- Wake Me Up (disambiguation)
- Wake Up Call (disambiguation)
- Waking Up (disambiguation)
- Woke, a term referring to a perceived awareness of issues concerning social justice
