= The Everlasting =

The Everlasting may refer to:

- "The Everlasting" (song), a 1998 song by Manic Street Preachers
- The Everlasting (album), an album by Loudness
- The Everlasting (role-playing game), a role-playing game created by Steve Brown
- The Everlasting (novel), a 2025 American romantic fantasy novel by Alix E. Harrow
