= I Shall Believe =

I Shall Believe may refer to:

- "I Shall Believe", a song by Matt Brouwer from Unlearning
- "I Shall Believe", a song by Sheryl Crow from Tuesday Night Music Club
- "I Shall Believe", an episode of the series One Tree Hill
