= Someone Else's Arms =

Someone Else's Arms may refer to:

- Someone Else's Arms, a 1970 Barbara Acklin album and its title track released as a single
- "Someone Else's Arms", a song by Mae on the 2005 album The Everglow
- "Someone Else's Arms", a song by Matt Brouwer from the 2012 album Till the Sunrise
