= Waking Up =

Waking Up may refer to:

- Waking up, emerging from sleep

== Music ==
=== Albums ===
- Waking Up (Bethany Dillon album), and the title song, 2007
- Waking Up (OneRepublic album), and the title song, 2009
- Waking Up (Topper Headon album), 1986

=== Songs ===
- "Waking Up" (Elastica song), 1995
- Waking Up (Freya Ridings and MJ Cole song), 2018
- "Waking Up", by 10 Years from The Autumn Effect, 2005
- "Waking Up", by Bethany Dillon from Waking Up, 2007
- "Waking Up", by Bitter:Sweet from Drama, 2008
- "Waking Up", by Eels from Earth to Dora, 2020
- "Waking Up", by Funeral for a Friend from Casually Dressed & Deep in Conversation, 2003
- "Waking Up", by M83 from Oblivion: Original Motion Picture Soundtrack, 2013
- "Waking Up", by Matt Brouwer from Writing to Remember, 2014
- "Waking Up", by OneRepublic from Waking Up, 2009
- "Waking Up", by Starset from Divisions, 2019
- "Waking Up", by We the Kingdom from Holy Water, 2020

== Other uses ==
- Waking Up: A Guide to Spirituality Without Religion, a book by Sam Harris, 2014
  - Waking Up, his meditation app, 2018
  - Waking Up, his podcast started in 2013, renamed "Making Sense" in 2019 to differentiate it from his meditation app

== See also ==
- Waking up early, a productivity method
- Wake Up (disambiguation)
