= Writing to Remember =

Studio album by Matt Brouwer
- Released: November 25, 2014
- Recorded: Nashville, TN, Hollywood, CA, Houston, TX, Three Hills, AB
- Genre: CCM, alternative CCM
- Label: Black Shoe Records
- Producer: Michael Omartian, Ian Christian Nickus, Eldon Winter, Matt Brouwer

Matt Brouwer chronology
| Till The Sunrise (2012) | Writing to Remember (2014) |

Alternative cover
- Cover art for Matt Brouwer's 2015 single, "Waking Up" from the album "Writing to Remember".

Professional ratings
Review scores
| Source | Rating |
|---|---|
| Crosswalk | 5/5 stars |
| Alpha&Omega | 5/5 stars |
| MusicScribe | 4.5/5 stars |

Writing to Remember is the first compilation album by Canadian Singer/Songwriter Matt Brouwer. The album was released on November 25, 2014 and features a collection of the 14 best loved songs from Brouwer's previous 4 studio albums. All the songs have been remastered and some re-mixed as well. The album includes one brand new single which appears as the first track on the project called, "Waking Up". Brouwer and Co. opted to include original college recordings of his songs, "Breathe" and "Lead" instead of the more polished versions that appear on his debut album, Imagerical. The exclusive single, "Waking Up, from the album was nominated for song of the year by the GMA Canada Covenant awards.

== Track listing ==
| # | Title | Length | Composer |
|---|---|---|---|
| 1. | "Waking Up" | 3:58 | Matt Brouwer |
| 2. | "Tonight" | 4:16 | Matt Brouwer |
| 3. | "Sometimes" | 4:47 | Matt Brouwer |
| 4. | "Water" | 4:46 | Sean Hall, Matt Brouwer, Jill Paquette |
| 5. | "Ocean" | 4:00 | Matt Brouwer |
| 6. | "Writing to Remember" | 4:09 | Matt Brouwer |
| 7. | "Thornside" | 3:25 | Matt Brouwer, Jeff Somers |
| 8. | "I Shall Believe" | 4:49 | Sheryl Crow, Bill Bottrell |
| 9. | "The Other Side" with Amy Grant and Vince Gill | 3:52 | Matt Brouwer |
| 10. | "Love Can Find A Way" with JJ Heller | 3:58 | Matt Brouwer, David Heller, JJ Heller |
| 11. | "Sanity" | 4:38 | Matt Brouwer |
| 12. | "Come Back Around" | 2:48 | Matt Brouwer, Jeffery Armstreet, Ian Nickus |
| 13. | "Rivers of Mercy" | 5:19 | Matt Brouwer, Tim Milner |
| 14. | "Breathe" | 3:59 | Matt Brouwer, Jill Paquette |
| 15. | "Lead" | 2:55 | Matt Brouwer |
