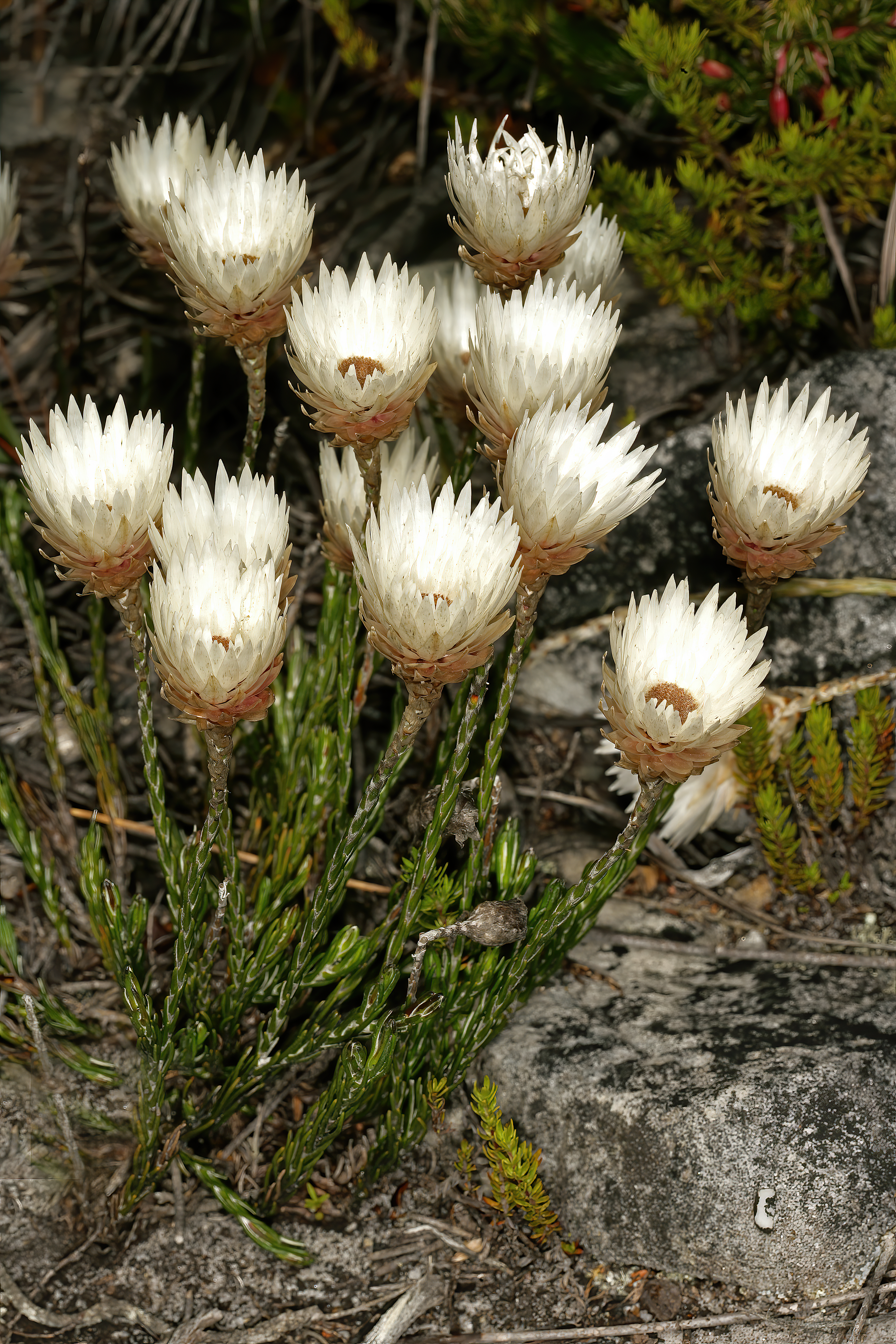

Scientific classification
- Kingdom: Plantae
- Clade: Tracheophytes
- Clade: Angiosperms
- Clade: Eudicots
- Clade: Asterids
- Order: Asterales
- Family: Asteraceae
- Genus: Edmondia
- Species: E. pinifolia

Binomial name
- Edmondia pinifolia (Lam.) Hilliard, (1981)

Synonyms
- Aphelexis humilis D.Don; Aphelexis humilis var. macrantha Paxton; Aphelexis macrantha var. rosea Hereman; Argyrocome staehelina Schrank; Helichrysum humile Less.; Helichrysum longebracteatum Schrank; Helichrysum pinifolium Schrank; Helichrysum spectabile G.Lodd. ex J.Forbes; Helichrysum squamosum Thunb.; Helipterum humile DC.; Helipterum longibracteatum Steud.; Xeranthemum humile Andrews; Xeranthemum pinifolium Lam.

= Edmondia pinifolia =

Species of flowering plant

Edmondia pinifolia is a shrub that grows only 30 cm tall. The species is endemic to the Northern Cape and Western Cape where it is found from the Cederberg to the Cape Peninsula as well as the Kogelberg. The plant flowers from September to December. The species is part of the fynbos.
