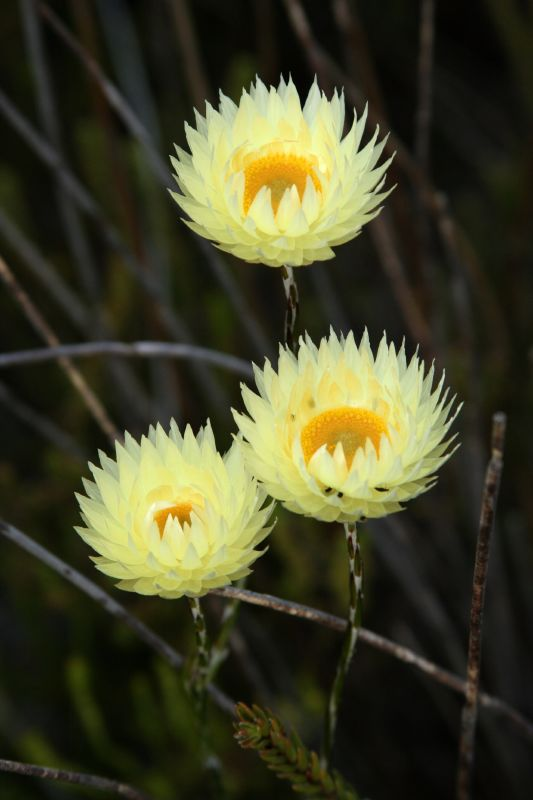

Scientific classification
- Kingdom: Plantae
- Clade: Tracheophytes
- Clade: Angiosperms
- Clade: Eudicots
- Clade: Asterids
- Order: Asterales
- Family: Asteraceae
- Genus: Edmondia
- Species: E. sesamoides

Binomial name
- Edmondia sesamoides (L.) Hilliard, (1981)

Synonyms
- Aphelexis filiformis D.Don; Aphelexis heterophylla G.Don; Aphelexis sesamoides D.Don; Argyrocome sesamodes Kuntze; Edmondia bicolor Cass.; Edmondia bracteata Cass.; Edmondia splendens Cass.; Gnaphalium sesamodes Kuntze; Helichrysum filiforme Less.; Helichrysum heterophyllum Steud.; Helichrysum pseudofasciculatum Schrank; Helichrysum sesamoides Willd.; Helipterum filiforme DC.; Helipterum heterophyllum DC.; Helipterum sesamoides DC.; Xeranthemum heterophyllum Lam.; Xeranthemum sesamoides L.

= Edmondia sesamoides =

Species of flowering plant

Edmondia sesamoides is a shrub that grows only 30 cm tall. The species is endemic to the Northern Cape and Western Cape where it is found in fynbos on sandstone slopes. The plant flowers from August to December.
