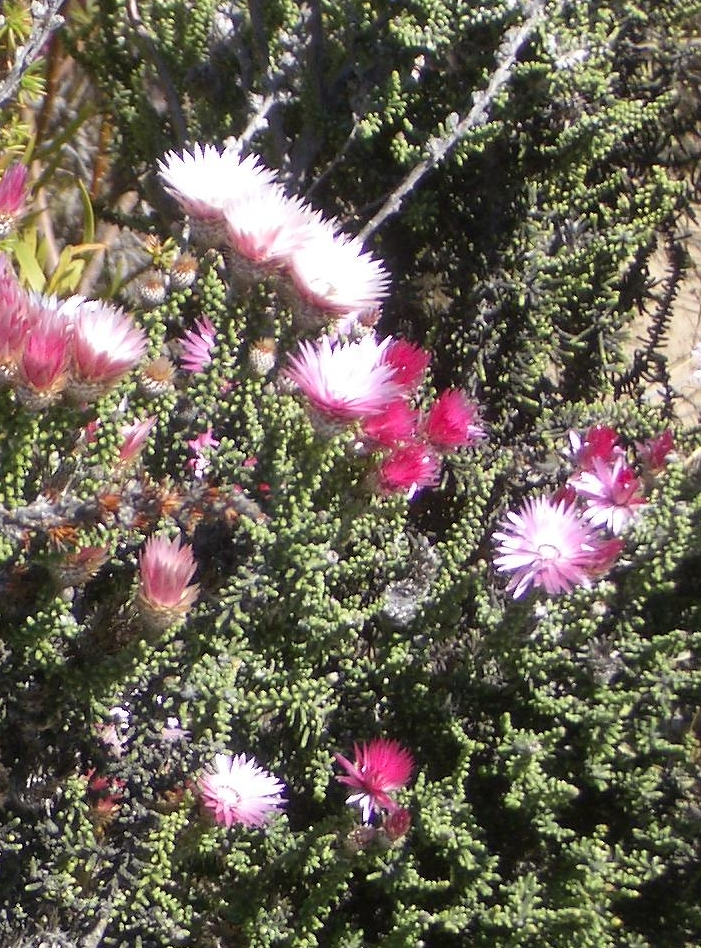
- Phaenocoma prolifera in flower

Scientific classification
- Kingdom: Plantae
- Clade: Embryophytes
- Clade: Tracheophytes
- Clade: Angiosperms
- Clade: Eudicots
- Clade: Asterids
- Order: Asterales
- Family: Asteraceae
- Subfamily: Asteroideae
- Tribe: Gnaphalieae
- Genus: Phaenocoma; D.Don
- Species: P. prolifera

Binomial name
- Phaenocoma prolifera (L.) D.Don

Synonyms
- Xeranthemum proliferum L.

= Phaenocoma =

Genus of flowering plants

Phaenocoma is a genus of South African plants in the tribe Gnaphalieae within the family Asteraceae. The name is derived from the Greek roots φαίνω (to shine) and κόμη (hair), which refer to dry and shiny involucral bracts.

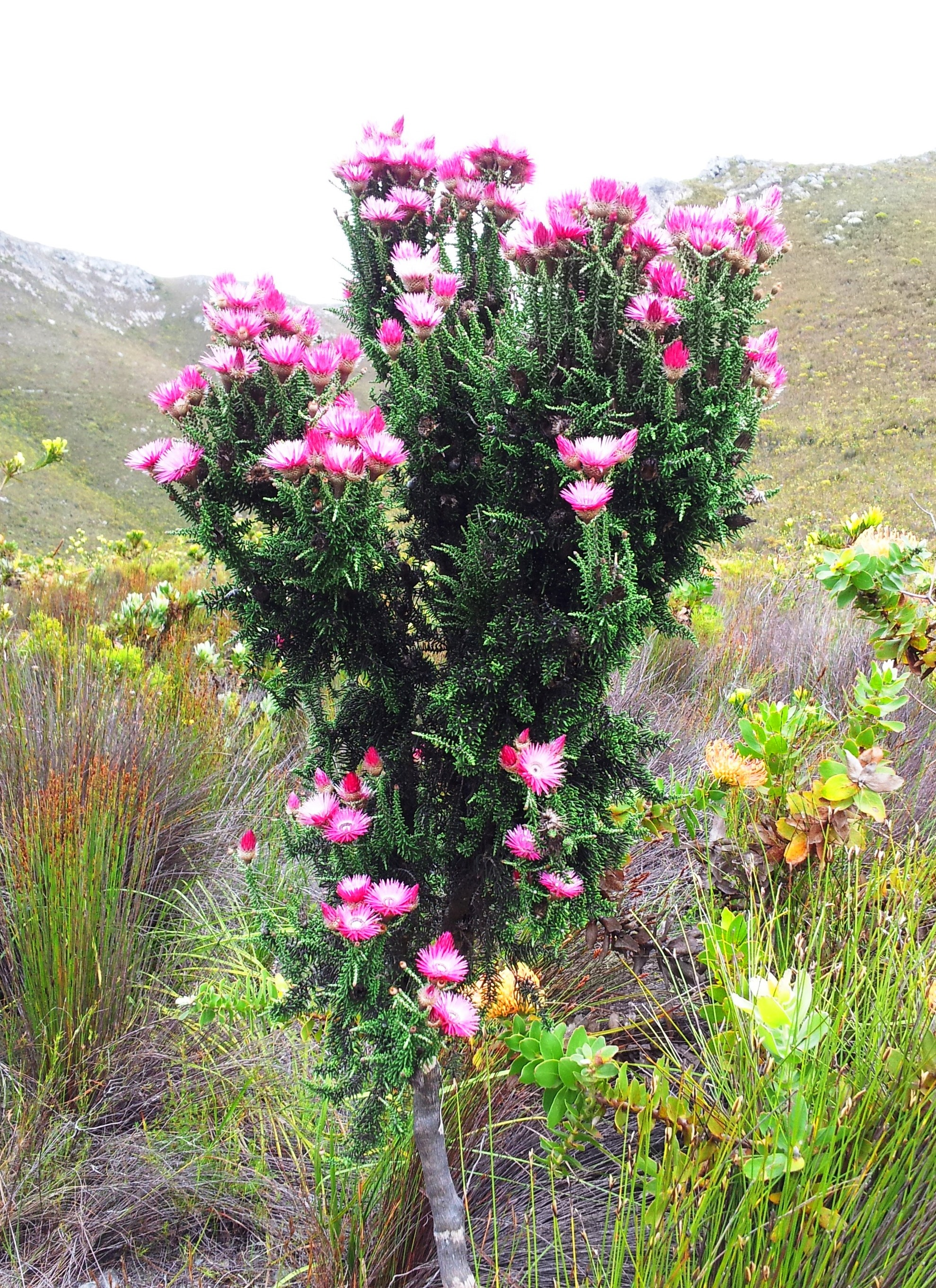
Cape Strawflower in bloom

== Species ==
There is only one known species, Phaenocoma prolifera (Cape strawflower). The strawflower is native to cool, well-drained, sandy, mineral soils - often on slopes. It occurs in full sun, in mountain and valley Fynbos shrublands, throughout the southern parts of the Western Cape, South Africa.

== Description ==
It grows to over a meter in height, and tapers at the top, often forming a Christmas-tree shape. The leaves are tiny, rounded, and densely cover the stems.

The purple and pink flowers mostly appear in Spring, on the tips of the upper branches, though they remain for most of the year. What look like petals are actually the bracts. They are rigid, papery and dry and do not wilt. When cut as ornamentals, the flowers also last for years, provided that they are kept dry. For this reason, it is one of several species which are given the nickname "Everlasting". (The other plants commonly given this name include species of Syncarpha, Helichrysum and Edmondia) The flowers remain on the bushes and become gradually more pale through the summer.

== Taxonomy ==
The genus, and its sole surviving species, is an archaic and outlying relict plant.
