= Eden (Irish musician) =

Irish musician

EDEN
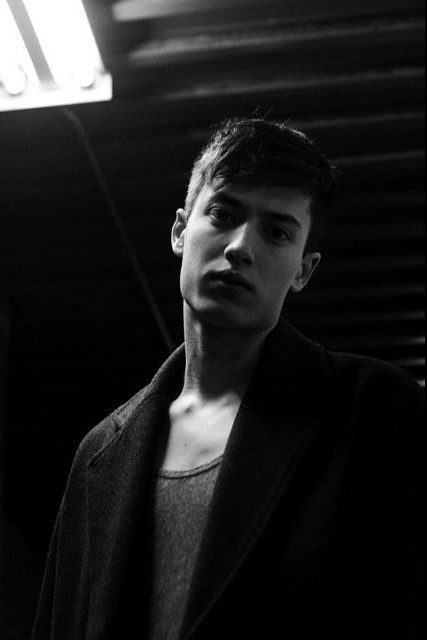
- EDEN in April 2016

Background information
- Also known as: The Eden Project; The Spab Project
- Born: Jonathon Ng; 23 December 1995 (age 30); Dublin, Ireland
- Genres: Alternative rock; R&B; dream pop; indietronica; indie pop; electronic
- Occupations: Musician; singer; songwriter; record producer
- Instruments: Vocals; piano; guitar; drums; violin
- Years active: 2012–present
- Labels: Astralwerks; MCMXCV
- Website: iameden.eu

Jonathon Ng (born 23 December 1995), known professionally as Eden (stylised as EDEN), is an Irish musician, singer, songwriter, record producer, and occasional model. He formerly operated as The Spab Project and later The Eden Project, an alias discontinued in 2015. Ng's work as The Eden Project typically featured more conventional styles of electronic dance music, such as dubstep and drum and bass, while EDEN saw himself venturing into an indie pop style.

Ng released six EPs and over 70 songs and remixes as The Eden Project. As EDEN, he launched his own record label, MCMXCV, on which his debut EP End Credits was released. His second EP, I Think You Think Too Much of Me, was released in August 2016, debuting at No. 43 on the Irish Albums Chart as his first charting music. EDEN's debut studio album Vertigo was released on 19 January 2018 and was supported by a world tour. In February 2020, Ng released his sophomore studio album called No Future, which was followed by another world tour. No Future made it to the top 150 of the all-genres album charts and the top 10 of the alternative album charts one day after release. On 9 September 2022, Ng released his third studio album ICYMI. Afterwards, his fourth studio album Dark was released around 3 years later on 22 August 2025.

== Life and career ==
=== Early life ===
Jonathon was born on 23 December 1995 to an Irish mother and a Hong Kong father in Dublin, Ireland. From the age of seven, he was trained in classical violin. He later taught himself the piano, guitar, and drums. He attended and graduated from Blackrock College, Dublin.

=== 2013–2015; The Eden Project ===
Ng began independently releasing tracks as The Eden Project in 2013, achieving popularity through promotion networks. In 2014, he released the album Kairos, in which the tracks "Statues" and "Chasing Ghosts" experimented with a more subdued alternative style of music. He also was a vocalist in "Iris" (performed by Exit Friendzone) and made the track "Lost." Both tracks, along with "Chasing Ghosts", were released on NoCopyrightSounds. In October 2014, he released the Entrance EP, whose indie track "Circles" contrasted his familiar electronic style. His most popular tracks were deviations from his usual sound. On 10 December 2014, he was featured on the track "Scribble" by New York-based producer Puppet, which was released through Monstercat.

In 2015, Ng further embraced his indie style with the Bipolar Paradise EP, whose track "Fumes" has amassed over 17 million views on YouTube as of 28 March 2023. He later announced that he was discontinuing The Eden Project and released Final Call, his last EP under the alias. It contained two covers, one being "Blank Space" by Taylor Swift and the other "Crazy In Love" by Beyonce. "Times Like These" is officially the last song released under his former alias.

=== 2015–2016; Change to EDEN, End Credits, ITYTTMOM and Futurebound Tour ===
Ng changed his alias to EDEN following the release of Final Call and began recording new work in spring 2015. The End Credits EP was released for free download worldwide on 8 August 2015 through UK-based label Seeking Blue Records, as well as Ng's own imprint MCMXCV. The EP consists of indie pop and alternative electronica tracks with a strong emphasis on vocals. Two singles, "Nocturne" and "Gravity," were released in June and July, respectively. As a whole, the EP has amassed over 14 million plays on the streaming platform SoundCloud.

On 22 March 2016, Ng embarked on his End Credits Tour, with concerts in Dublin, London, Toronto, New York City, Los Angeles, and San Francisco. Elliot Crabb was the main producer for the tracks and joined the End Credits Tour. The tickets were sold out within the week, and an additional venue was set up in New York City due to demand. The tour concluded on 8 April.

Shortly after his End Credits tour, Ng announced that his new EP, I Think You Think Too Much of Me, would be released on 19 August 2016. On 10 June 2016, the first single, "Sex," was released, featuring a greater focus on vocals and instrumentation. A month later, Billboard premiered the next single, "Drugs," a day before its official release on 15 July 2016. The EP features "Fumes," formerly released under The Eden Project, featuring Gnash, in addition to re-releases of two other The Eden Project songs, remastered versions of "XO" and "Circles." After release, the EP charted on the Irish Albums Chart, becoming Ng's first charting music.

On 7 September 2016, Ng released a second music video for "Drugs," a 360-degree video experience in virtual reality. The video amassed 1.5 million Facebook views in one week.

Ng promoted I Think You Think Too Much of Me through the Futurebound Tour, which began on 7 September 2016 in Vancouver, British Columbia, Canada. The tour included 33 performances in North America and Europe and concluded on 26 November with a final show in Paris, France.

=== 2017–2019; Vertigo and Vertigo World Tour ===
Ng embarked on a festival tour in the summer of 2017. He also selected a few fans to film their experiences at each show and post them to his Snapchat account. On 2 September, Ng performed his final show of the festival season at Electric Picnic. During his set, he premiered the official version of "Start//End," a song that had previously been leaked on his SoundCloud account in January.

On 28 September "Start//End" was released on all major music platforms as the first single from the upcoming album Vertigo. The single was accompanied by a music video, which has surpassed 1 million views after trending on YouTube. The video was shot in various places in Europe, North America, and Japan.

On 8 November 2017 Ng hinted toward the release of a new single on social media. On 8 and 9 November, Ng's website displayed coordinates where people scavenged to find posters hidden in various locations across the world. "Gold" was officially released 10 November 2017 alongside the announcement of the Vertigo World Tour, which spanned from March to May 2018. Ng's third single for the album, "Crash," was released on 8 December 2017 on Spotify and iTunes.

Vertigo was released on 19 January 2018. Ng began the Vertigo World Tour in March 2018. The tour ran for eight months, concluding on 27 November. The tour contained 67 shows: 50 in North America, 12 in Europe, and 5 in Oceania. He was joined by various opening acts, including VÉRITÉ, Kacy Hill, and Sasha Sloan.

On 29 June 2018 Ng released an EP called About Time from the collection of songs which were played during the Vertigo World Tour during the break between parts two and three of the tour. Ng released a single, "909," on 24 April 2019.

=== 2019–2022; No Future and No Future World Tour ===
Two singles from the album No Future, "Untitled" and "Projector," were released during October 2019. In December 2019 "Love, Death, Distraction" and in January 2020 "Isohel" were further released. No Future was officially released on 14 February 2020.

A 2020 world tour was planned in support of the album's release, starting with a hometown show at the Olympia Theatre, Dublin. However, following this show and two subsequent shows at the Roundhouse, London and the Manchester Albert Hall, the No Future world tour was postponed indefinitely due to the COVID-19 pandemic. The tour was later cancelled completely on 12 May 2020.

=== 2022–2024; ICYMI and ICYMI World Tour ===
On 3 June 2022 Ng released a song called "Modern Warfare" from his new album ICYMI, an acronym for In Case You Missed It, that contains parts of his unreleased songs that were sometimes performed during the End Credits anniversary tour. The album is about accepting the highs and lows of life and pushing the boundaries of music. On 8 July 2022, Ng released the second song from the new album called "Balling," where Ng sings about the loss of friends and contemplates the idea of not being there for the people you love. On 12 August 2022, Eden released the third ICYMI song called "Sci-Fi." All 3 singles would be accompanied by a music video that provided visual interpretations for each song.

The album, which was accompanied by a world tour, was announced on 10 August 2022 with an official release date on 9 September 2022. Throughout the tour, Ng played a few songs from the album accompanied by his other popular songs and new remixes of his songs.

=== 2024–present; Dark, Dark Tour, and DDAARRKK ===
On 2 July 2024, Ng released a single for his fourth studio album Dark, titled "Zzz". Releases came monthly afterwards with "5ever" on 2 August 2024, "Pocket (Montreal)" on 30 August 2024, and "Friday Night Song" on 27 September 2024, later to be removed from the final album tracklist and replaced by "Gggiiiiirrrrlllll". "Friday Night Song" was praised by Nicole Otero of Euphoria Magazine stating ""Friday Night Song" perfectly describes the feeling of a Friday night at a club filled with strobe lights and loudspeakers that blur all the noise from the outside world."

On 16 June 2025, Ng released a statement on Instagram that in August 2024, he had parted ways with his management team during the rollout of his fourth album. After beginning work with a new management team and label, he was subsequently dropped which put the plans of releasing the album on an indefinite hiatus. However, Ng and his team were able to buy the rights to the singles "Zzz", "Pocket (Montreal)", and "5ever" and allowing the album to begin work once more.

The tour for Dark was announced and an album playback event previewing the songs for it was hosted at a parking lot in London on the same day, which was three days prior to its release later on 22 August 2025. Most songs on the album had official visualizers, with "Pocket (Montreal)", "5ever", "Gggiiiiirrrrlllll", "Ghost In The Shell" and "Still" having their own music videos.

On 27 October 2025, Ng announced 'DDAARRKK', an extended version of 'Dark' with five additional songs. In the same post, Ng would elaborate on the creative process behind the original album, thanking those involved in the production of the album as well as expressing optimism about the future. 'I am so thankful that this album got to live. And I am so thankful to feel like there is a future for me in all of this again. Excited for whats to come, after everything. I'll take my luck when it comes. And I'll keep it moving when it doesn't.', Ng said about the album.

== Personal life and artistry ==
Ng originally became interested in music around the age of 4 to 6 when he initially heard the song "Sandstorm" by Darude on CD. He initially started by creating electronic tracks, and a few years later he started singing over these tracks.

Ng first became popular in major cities around the world before becoming known in his hometown. Since 2017, Ng has played a song known as "Joyrider" by Burnt Out, before the start of every concert in order to further connect him to his hometown.

Ng had an alias known as "The Spab Project". Under this alias he would release different sounds that had no real purpose or meaning. He never released his dedicated music under this alias, only short clips of music he was experimenting with or found funny on SoundCloud.

Growing up, Ng was ashamed of his Asian heritage. In the COVID-19 pandemic, however, Ng came to embrace his Asian heritage during the 2021 Stop Asian Hate. This new self-love and the willingness to experiment and blend different styles would come to inspire different tracks for his new album ICYMI.

Despite his success, he continues to operate on his own, producing, writing, and recording his music completely independently.

Due to the influence the online world of music has had on Ng, he considers himself to be a "product of the internet."

Ng's experience with classical music through orchestra and the violin helped his growth as a musician.

He is a supporter of Liverpool F.C.

== Additional works ==
Prior to the release of End Credits, Ng provided uncredited vocals for Mendum's song "Elysium", as well as credited vocals for Crywolf's song "Stomach It". The vocals from "Woah", a track in The Eden Project's Final Call EP, were sampled in the track "I'll Be Your Reason" by Illenium. Following the release of End Credits, Ng provided uncredited vocals on the track "No More" by Pierce Fulton, which was released on 9 November 2015 through Armada Music. Ng also provided vocals for Illenium's "Leaving" in 2017. In 2018, Ng provided uncredited vocals for Jeremy Zucker's "Thinking 2 Much".

Ng also performed the song Amnesia, presumably during his last year in secondary school. He later stated, during a livestream, that the song would never have a studio version.

In November 2015, Ng released a cover of Michael Jackson's "Billie Jean" for free download. It amassed over 1 million plays on most streaming platforms.

== Discography ==
=== Studio albums ===
Title	Details	Peak chart positions						
Title	Details	IRE	BEL	CAN	NED	NZ	UK	US
Vertigo	Released: 19 January 2018; Label: MCMXCV, Astralwerks, Universal; Format: Streaming, CD, CS, digital download, vinyl	31	96	76	79	2	93	34
No Future	Released: 14 February 2020; Label: MCMXCV, Astralwerks, Universal; Format: Streaming, digital download, vinyl, CD, CS	—	—	26	—	—	—	26
ICYMI	Released: 9 September 2022; Label: MCMXCV; Format: Streaming, digital download, vinyl	—	—	—	—	—	—	—
Dark	Released: 22 August 2025; Label: MCMXCV; Format: Streaming, digital download, vinyl	—	—	—	—	—	—	—

=== Extended plays ===
Title	Details	Peak chart positions				
Title	Details	IRE	AUS	NZ	UK	US
End Credits	Released: 8 August 2015; Labels: MCMXCV, Seeking Blue; Formats: Streaming, digital download, vinyl	—	—	—	—	—
I Think You Think Too Much of Me	Released: 19 August 2016; Labels: MCMXCV, Astralwerks; Formats: Streaming, CS, digital download, vinyl	43	44	3	153	104
About Time	Released: 29 June 2018; Labels: MCMXCV, Astralwerks; Formats: Streaming, digital download	—	—	—	—	—
All You Need Is Love	Released: 27 July 2018; Labels: MCMXCV, Astralwerks; Formats: Streaming, digital download	—	—	—	—	—
(2019)(2022)	Released: 19 April 2024; Labels: MCMXCV, TH3RD BRAIN; Formats: Streaming, digital download	—	—	—	—	—
Friday Night Song	Released: 27 September 2024; Labels: MCMXCV, TH3RD BRAIN; Formats: Streaming, digital download	—	—	—	—	—
Gggiiiiirrrrlllll	Released: 27 June 2025; Labels: MCMXCV; Formats: Streaming, digital download	—	—	—	—	—
Ghost In The Shell	Released: 25 July 2025; Labels: MCMXCV; Formats: Streaming, digital download	—	—	—	—	—
Still	Released: 21 August 2025; Labels: MCMXCV; Formats: Streaming, digital download	—	—	—	—	—
"—" denotes a recording that did not chart or was not released in that territory.

=== As main artist ===
Title	Year	Certification	Album
"Chasing Ghosts"	2014		
"Lost"	2014		
"Nocturne"	2015		End Credits
"Gravity"	2015		End Credits
"End Credits" (featuring Leah Kelly)	2015		End Credits
"Billie Jean"	2016		Non-album single
"Sex"	2016	BPI: Gold; RIAA: Gold	I Think You Think Too Much of Me
"Drugs"	2016		I Think You Think Too Much of Me
"Circles"	2016		I Think You Think Too Much of Me
"Start//End"	2017		Vertigo
"Gold"	2017		Vertigo
"Crash"	2017		Vertigo
"About Time"	2018		Non-album singles
"All You Need Is Love"	2018		Non-album singles
"909"	2019		Non-album singles
"Untitled"	2019		No Future
"Projector"	2019		No Future
"Love, Death, Distraction"	2020		No Future
"Isohel"	2020		No Future
"Peaked"	2020		New World Tapes
"Modern Warfare"	2022		ICYMI
"Balling"	2022		ICYMI
"Sci-Fi"	2022		ICYMI
"Cant"	2024		Non-album singles
"The Love U Need"	2024		Non-album singles
"Zzz"	2024		Dark
"5ever"	2024		Dark
"Pocket (Montreal)"	2024		Dark
"Friday Night Song"	2024		Non-album single
"Gggiiiiirrrrlllll"	2025		Dark
"Ghost In The Shell"	2025		Dark
"Still"	2025		Dark
"—" denotes releases that did not chart or were not released in that territory.

== Tours ==
- End Credits Tour (2016)
- Futurebound Tour (2016)
- Vertigo World Tour (2018)
- No Future Tour (2020) (cancelled due to COVID-19 pandemic)
- End Credits Anniversary Tour (2021)
- ICYMI Tour (2023)
- Dark Tour (2025)
