= Wake Up Call =

Wake Up Call may refer to:

- Wake-up call, a telephone service provided by lodging establishments

== Television ==
- Wake Up Call (2002 TV program), an American business news program
- Wake Up Call (2014 TV series), an American reality series hosted by Dwayne "The Rock" Johnson
- "Wake Up Call" (The 4400 episode), a 2005 episode
- "Wake Up Call" (Doctors), a 2004 episode
- "Wake Up Call" (Once Upon a Time), a 2017 episode
- "The Wake Up Call" (The West Wing), a 2005 episode

== Music ==
=== Albums ===
- Wake-Up Call (album), a 1993 album by Petra
- Wake Up Call (John Mayall album), 1993
- Wake Up Call (Theory of a Deadman album), 2017, or the title song
- Wake Up Call, a 2019 mixtape by Yeat

=== Songs ===
- "Wake Up Call" (Maroon 5 song), 2007
- "Wake Up Call" (Phil Collins song), 2003
- "Wake Up Call" (Nothing But Thieves song), 2015
- "Wake Up Call" (KSI song), 2020 song by KSI featuring Trippie Redd
- "Wake Up Call", a song by Hayden Panettiere
- "Wake-Up Call", a song by AFI from Very Proud of Ya
- "Wake Up Call", a song by the Prodigy from Always Outnumbered, Never Outgunned
- "Wake Up Call", a song by Relient K from their self-titled debut album

== See also ==
- Wake Up (disambiguation)
