= Vertigo (Eden album) =

2018 album

Studio album by Eden
- Released: 19 January 2018
- Genres: alternative rock; indie pop; electronic; indietronica; alternative pop; glitch pop; alternative R&B; bedroom pop; experimental pop; art pop; electropop
- Length: 52:08
- Labels: MCMXCV; Astralwerks
- Producer: Eden

Eden chronology
I Think You Think Too Much of Me (2016)	Vertigo (2018)	No Future (2020)

Singles from vertigo
- 1. "Start//End" Released: 28 September 2017; 2. "Gold" Released: 10 November 2017; 3. "Crash" Released: 8 December 2017

Vertigo (stylized in all lowercase) is the first studio album by the Irish musician Eden, released on 19 January 2018 by his own label MCMXCV and distributed by Astralwerks. It was produced, mixed and recorded in New York, Los Angeles and Dublin. The album was supported by a world tour.

== Background and recording ==
The entirety of Vertigo was written, recorded, produced, mixed and mastered by Eden, with very little outside help.

In the third edition of his yearly video series, 365x, Eden said, "This album has been for me since I first started thinking about working on it, years ago. It has been a catalyst of change in so many ways for me, and it's taught me so much more about myself than I ever thought it would. I made vertigo by myself, for myself, but it's finished now. So maybe it could be for you." About his thought process when choosing the title, he said, "That’s a really weird one because when I first started thinking about the album it was always called vertigo. It just felt right at the time. I didn’t really sit down and brainstorm it. I guess the album has a lot of disorientation in it, not sonically but as in the lyric content and personally. As I said before, it just felt right and that’s what I wanted the album to be… something that just felt right." About releasing the album, he said, "It's more like I'm uncovering something that's already there. Like how an archaeologist doesn't create a fossil–they're just finding it and uncovering it, and maybe rearranging it if it's broken. Releasing this body of work is terrifying and exciting and overwhelming for me. A lot of it is so personal. This album is not a coming of age story, but it caused one."

== Promotion ==
A scavenger hunt took place on 7 and 8 November 2017 in 13 cities across the world. At each location, posters contained a secret Spotify link to the single "Gold" two days before its release. A track titled "Vertigo_crowd_22.10.16" was also released on the ghost Spotify account. It largely consists of a soundbite from the final show of Eden's 2016 Futurebound Tour in Fort Lauderdale, Florida, in which he instructs the audience to call out certain words. These words would be used in songs "Take Care" and "Love; Not Wrong (Brave)".

Eden held four pre-album screenings in the week of the album's release, in Dublin, London, New York City and Los Angeles. Free tickets were provided by e-mail to fans who pre-ordered the digital album through his online store.

== Videos ==
The album's first single, "Start//End", was released on 28 September 2017, accompanied by a music video containing views from cities such as Dublin, London, Paris, Hong Kong, Seoul, Los Angeles, New York City and Tokyo.

The second single, "Gold", was released on 10 November 2017. Its music video contains shots of a family living in the countryside. The video for "Crash", released 8 December 2017, depicts the former husband of that family reminiscing about his past.

On the album's release day, the tenth track on the album, "Float", received a music video. In the video, "otherworldly happenings" illustrate the way that seemingly small moments in relationships often have massive impacts.

== Tour ==
EDEN announced the Vertigo World Tour on 10 November 2017. The tour visited cities across North America and Europe between March and May 2018. It was later extended to include a third, fourth and fifth leg.

== Track listing ==
All songs written and produced by Eden/Jonathon Ng.

No.	Title	Length
1.	"Wrong"	1:04
2.	"Take Care"	3:15
3.	"Start//End"	5:34
4.	"Wings"	2:57
5.	"Icarus"	6:45
6.	"Lost//Found"	3:23
7.	"Crash"	3:52
8.	"Gold"	3:16
9.	"Forever//Over"	5:42
10.	"Float"	3:18
11.	"Wonder"	4:23
12.	"Love; Not Wrong (Brave)"	3:37
13.	"Falling in Reverse"	4:59
Total length:		52:08

Notes

- Track titles are stylised in all lowercase letters.

Personnel

- Jonathon Ng – guitar, lyrics, drums, vocals, piano, sound design, production, mixing, mastering, engineering, programming, string arrangement.

Sample credits

- "icarus" samples Eden's own video "365x: 21".
- "falling in reverse" samples Kuzco's dialogue from the 2000 Disney animated film The Emperor's New Groove.

== Charts ==
Chart (2018)	Peak position
Belgian Albums (Ultratop Flanders)	96
Canadian Albums (Billboard)	76
Dutch Albums (Album Top 100)	79
Irish Albums (IRMA)	31
New Zealand Heatseeker Albums (RMNZ)	2
UK Albums (Official Charts)	93
US Billboard 200	34
