= Matt Brouwer =

Canadian singer and songwriter

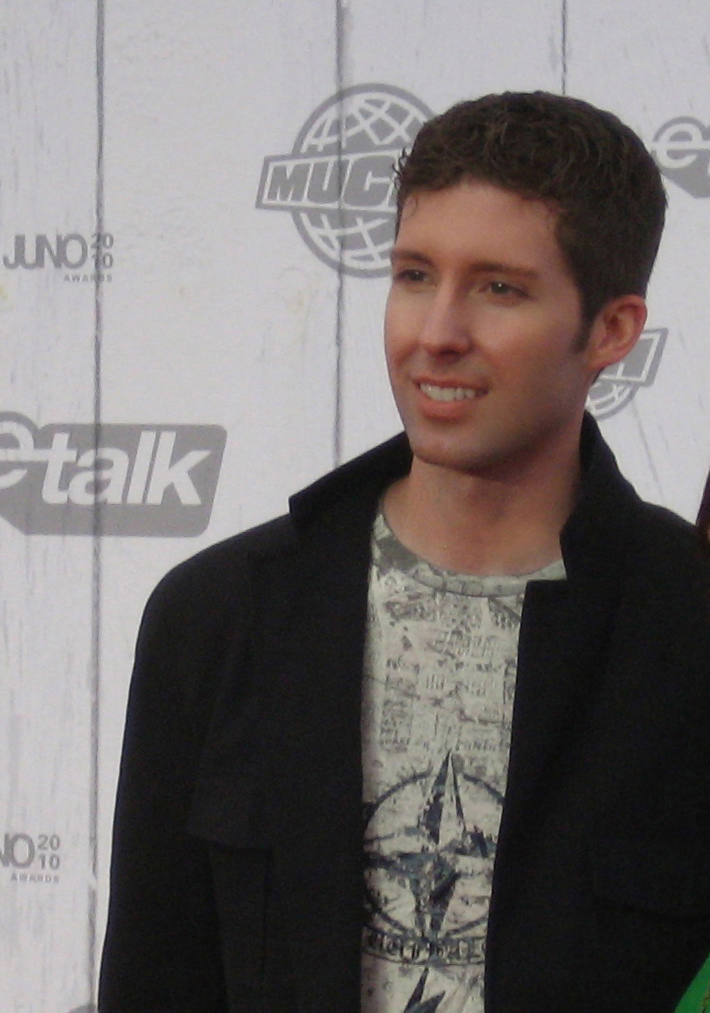
- Matt Brouwer at the 2010 Juno Awards in St. John's, Newfoundland

Background information
- Born: February 28, 1976 (age 49); Truro, Nova Scotia, Canada
- Origin: Nashville, Tennessee, U.S.
- Genres: CCM, pop
- Occupation(s): Singer, songwriter
- Instrument(s): Vocals, guitar, piano
- Years active: 2001–present
- Labels: Reunion, Black Shoe
- Website: mattbrouwer.com

Matt Brouwer (born February 28, 1976) is a Canadian singer and songwriter. While in college, he and fellow students founded the band Monday Night Worship (MNW). Because of the spiritual content of his lyrics he was 'discovered' by a Nashville record company in 2000, and in 2001 recorded his solo debut CD Imagerical. The album was released on May 29, 2001, on Reunion Records. He then formed his own label called Black Shoe Records and released albums titled Unlearning in 2005, Where's Our Revolution (Universal) in 2009, and Till The Sunrise in 2012. Brouwer's music is known for its Contemporary Christian message as he shares his life's story of tragedy (the death of his father) and hope (his spiritual pilgrimage) with his listeners.

== Early years ==
Matthew Paul Brouwer was born in Truro, Nova Scotia, Canada. His dad ran a dairy farm and his mother worked as a teacher. When Brouwer was three years old his father was killed in a car accident. Brouwer is one of 7 siblings.

While attending college, Brouwer co-founded a group known as Monday Night Worship (MNW). "It started with a conversation a group of us (students) had about our hunger to not only know about God, but to begin a journey of actually knowing Him," said Brouwer. MNW released two independent CDs featuring songs written and sung by Brouwer, many of which were also featured on his solo debut CD, Imagerical. Brouwer and other members of the college group eventually parted ways or were signed to Provident Label Group as separate acts.

== Musical career ==
Matt Brouwer's first single, "Water", was a hit on CCM radio's CHR chart, reaching No. 2 on R&R in 2001. The follow-up singles, "A New Song", and "Sanity", were top 20 and top 10 hits respectively as well. Brouwer hit the airwaves again with a cover of Sheryl Crow's "I Shall Believe", which graced Billboard's Christian chart in 2005. The hit "Sometimes" from Where's Our Revolution did even better, charting in the top 20 on Billboard in 2010. An acoustic cover version of the Goo Goo Dolls song, "Better Days", also charted for Brouwer on the Billboard chart in 2011. Brouwer's CD Imagerical was nominated for Best Gospel Album at the 2002 Canadian JUNO Awards. He won a JUNO Award in 2010 for the album Where's Our Revolution; it was named best Contemporary Christian/Gospel Album of the year. He has been nominated for 15 GMA Canada Covenant Awards, winning three. His songs have been featured in the Canadian produced hit teen television drama Degrassi.

== Personal life ==
Matt Brouwer married Hannah Dawn Ficker on August 29, 2010, in Houston, Texas. The couple met during a trip Brouwer took to Guatemala, where Hannah's family serves in medical missions. The couple has 3 children.

== Discography ==
=== Albums ===
- Imagerical (Reunion Records, 2001, review) OCLC: 47203906.
- Unlearning (Black Shoe Records, 2005, review) OCLC: 137341514.
- The B-Sides Recording, Vol. 1 (Black Shoe Records, 2006)
- Where's Our Revolution (Black Shoe Records, 2009, review) OCLC: 316822224.
- A Merry Little Christmas (Matt Brouwer) (Black Shoe Records, 2010, review OCLC: 881658967.
- Till The Sunrise (Black Shoe Records, 2012, review) OCLC: 828529155.
- Writing to Remember (Black Shoe Records, 2014, review)
- Best Days Ahead (Matt Brouwer Productions, 2024)
- Souvenirs: LIVE (2003-2012) (Matt Brouwer Productions, 2025)

=== Notable appearances ===
- Vocals on Jill Paquette's debut album Jill Paquette (Reunion, 2003)
- "Better Days" appeared on the TV show Jericho, Episode 1 (Pilot)

=== Songs on compilations ===
- Rock on Worship, "Water" (Madacy, 2002)
- Sea to Sea: I See The Cross, "Home" (CMC, 2005)
- Sea to Sea: The Voice of Creation, "Your Name" (CMC, 2007)
- GMA Canada presents 30th Anniversary Collection, "Water" (CMC, 2008)
- Sea to Sea: Christmas, "A Holly Jolly Christmas" (Lakeside, 2009)

== Awards and recognition ==
GMA Canada Covenant Awards

- 2009 Folk/Roots Song of the Year: The Other Side (with Amy Grant and Vince Gill)
- 2009 GMA Canada/Blessings Christian Marketplace Fan's Choice Award
- 2012 Inspirational Song of the Year: "Ocean"

East Coast Music Awards

- 2010 nominee, Gospel Recording of the Year: Where's Our Revolution
- 2013 nominee, Gospel Recording of the Year: Till The Sunrise

Juno Awards

- 2002 nominee, Contemporary Christian/Gospel Album of the Year: Imagerical
- 2010, Contemporary Christian/Gospel Album of the Year: Where's Our Revolution

Shai Awards (formerly the Vibe Awards)

- 2002 Male Vocalist of the Year
- 2002 Worship Album of the Year: Imagerical
