= Where's Our Revolution =

Studio album by Matt Brouwer
- Released: August 25, 2009
- Recorded: Nashville, TN
- Genre: CCM, alternative CCM
- Label: Black Shoe Records; Universal (distributor)
- Producer: Michael Omartian

Matt Brouwer chronology
Unlearning (2005)	Where's Our Revolution (2009)	A Merry Little Christmas (2010)

Alternative cover
- Unreleased cover art for Matt Brouwer's Where's Our Revolution - Promotional Copy

Professional ratings
Review scores
Source	Rating
Christian Music Planet	4.5/5 stars
Worship Leader Magazine	4.5/5 stars
Christianity Today	4/5 stars

Where's Our Revolution is the third studio album by Canadian singer-songwriter Matt Brouwer. It was released on August 25, 2009 through Universal Music Distribution. The album is Brouwer's most successful release to date and was well received with critics calling it, "...a gorgeous piece of work" and commending Brouwer's songwriting and vocal performance. The hit "Sometimes" reached the top 20 on the Billboard Hot Christian Songs chart and 3 other singles received considerable airplay on Christian radio stations in Canada and the US. The album won a Juno Award in 2010 as it was named best Contemporary Christian/Gospel Album of the year, and was also nominated for seven GMA Canada Covenant Awards, winning the Covenant Award for best song and fan favorite artist of the year. The album was nominated for Gospel Recording of the Year by the East Coast Music Awards and Contemporary Christian/Gospel Album and Song of the Year by the Independent Music Awards.

== Track listing ==
#	Title	Length	Composer
1.	"Come Back Around"	2:48	Matt Brouwer, Jeffrey Armstreet, Ian Nickus
2.	"Beautiful Now"	4:13	Matt Brouwer, Jeffrey Armstreet
3.	"Where's Our Revolution"	4:11	Matt Brouwer
4.	"Running To Begin"	4:33	Matt Brouwer, Ian Nickus, Jayson Belt
5.	"Writing To Remember (The North Horizon)"	4:09	Matt Brouwer
6.	"All I Really Want"	3.23	Matt Brouwer, Ian Nickus
7.	"Sometimes"	4:47	Matt Brouwer
8.	"Please Say"	3:21	Matt Brouwer, Michael Omartian
9.	"The Other Side" with Amy Grant and Vince Gill	3:53	Matt Brouwer
10.	"All The Way"	3:29	Matt Brouwer
11.	"A Love That Saves Me"	3:44	Matt Brouwer
12.	"Good Night's Sleep"	4:11	Matt Brouwer

== Charts ==
2010	"Sometimes" - U.S. Billboard Hot Christian Songs	#19

== Awards ==
2010	Juno Award - Contemporary Christian/Gospel album of the year

2009	Covenant Award - Folk/Roots song of the year	"The Other Side"
