= A Merry Little Christmas (Matt Brouwer album) =

Studio album by Matt Brouwer
- Released: December 7, 2010
- Studio: Malibu, California, Houston, Texas
- Genre: CCM, alternative CCM
- Label: Black Shoe
- Producer: Matt Brouwer, Josh Smith

Matt Brouwer chronology
Where's Our Revolution (2009)	A Merry Little Christmas (2010)	Till the Sunrise (2012)

Alternative cover
- Limited edition promotional cover art and Christmas card

Professional ratings
Review scores
Source	Rating
Crosswalk	4.5 stars

A Merry Little Christmas is the first Christmas release by Canadian singer-songwriter Matt Brouwer. The seven song collection was released on December 7, 2010, through Universal Music Distribution. The album includes "Angels Sing", an original composition written by Brouwer, as well as a cover of the Goo Goo Dolls hit "Better Days" that charted for Brouwer on the Billboard Christian chart in January 2011. Brouwer's version of the song was added to regular, non-seasonal CCM playlists on Air1 and KLOVE Christian stations throughout the following year.

== Track listing ==
#	Title	Length	Composer
1.	"Christmastime is Here"	4:20	Vince Guaraldi, Lee Mendelson
2.	"Let it Snow"	2:09	Sammy Cahn, Julie Styne
3.	"Better Days"	3:30	John Rzeznik
4.	"O Come O Come Emmanuel"	3:28	Traditional
5.	"Angels Sing"	4:40	Matt Brouwer
6.	"Holly Jolly Christmas"	2:57	John Marks
7.	"Have Yourself a Merry Little Christmas"	3:10	H. Martin, R. Blane, J. Fricke

== Charts ==
2011	"Better Days" - U.S. Billboard Hot Christian Songs	#39
