= I Think You Think Too Much of Me =

i think you think too much of me

EP by EDEN
- Released: 19 August 2016
- Recorded: Dublin
- Genre: Alternative, Indietronica, Indie pop
- Label: MCMXCV; Astralwerks
- Producer: EDEN

EDEN chronology
End Credits (2015)	i think you think too much of me (2016)	vertigo (2018)

Singles from i think you think too much of me
- 1. "Sex" Released: 10 June 2016; 2. "Drugs" Released: 15 July 2016

I Think You Think Too Much of Me (stylized in all lowercase) is the second EP by Irish musician EDEN, released on 19 August 2016 through his own label MCMXCV and distributed by Astralwerks. The EP was recorded and produced in Dublin and contains seven tracks spanning approximately 27 minutes. i think you think too much of me is the first of Ng's works to be released on physical media, with two 12-inch vinyl formats, clear red and clear being made available on his own store, a clear blue version being produced for general sale, and on Compact Cassette.

The EP debuted at No. 43 on the Irish Albums Chart, becoming Ng's first charting album. The EP also charted in Australia, the United Kingdom, and the United States.

== Background ==
The EP was announced after the conclusion of Ng's End Credits tour and release of his cover single "Hey Ya". As with his previous songs, the entirety of the EP was written and produced by himself. During production, he created three different versions of "Drugs" and two versions of "Rock + Roll". By contrast, "And" was written in "a day or two" and became one of the fastest songs he produced. The songs drew on a combination of past experiences.

The singles "Sex" and "Drugs" were released on 10 June and 14 July 2016 respectively, with the former garnering praise from the singer Lorde who described "Sex" as "messy and emotional and twitchy and kind of in love and definitely as freaked out as that situation feels." Billboard live streamed "Drugs" on Facebook and released the single exclusively on their platform a day earlier than the worldwide release.

The songs "Fumes", "Circles" and "XO" are updated versions of songs released under his old alias The Eden Project. The remastered version of "Fumes" features a collaboration with American musician Gnash. EDEN has stated that the EP "is more of a realization than a journey", while also noting that "the songs are all intertwined, but in different ways."

== Promotion ==
In July 2016, there were reports of mysterious packages containing a virtual reality head set being sent to EDEN fans. It was later revealed that the headsets were included in the VIP packages for the Futurebound tour. On 7 September 2016, a 360-degree music video for "Drugs" was released.

I Think You Think Too Much of Me was supported by the Futurebound Tour, which featured 33 performances in North America and Europe.

== Music videos ==
Three music videos were released for this album. The video for "Sex" was uploaded onto YouTube on 14 June 2016. The video takes place in Tokyo, Japan and Sydney, Australia. The music video for "Drugs" was filmed in Los Angeles and was released through YouTube on 18 August 2016. A second music video was released as a 360 degree virtual reality experience on 7 September 2016. The music video for "Rock + Roll" was filmed primarily at the Wild Atlantic Way and in South County Dublin, Ireland and was released on 4 October 2016.

== Artwork ==
The album cover depicts the album name written continuously in a square shape with the EDEN logo spanned across the text on a grey background. The covers of the singles are of his first concert scenes in different lighting environments.

== Track listing ==
All songs were composed by Jonathon Ng.

No.	Title	Length
1.	"Sex"	3:38
2.	"Drugs"	5:38
3.	"And"	2:13
4.	"Rock + Roll"	4:56
5.	"Fumes" (featuring Gnash)	3:34
6.	"XO"	2:39
7.	"Circles"	4:34
Total length:		27:12

Notes

- Tracks 1 to 4 are stylized in lowercase.

== Personnel ==
- Jonathon Ng – guitar, vocals, piano, sound design, production, mixing, engineering, string arrangement
- Chris Finney - additional dialogue (track 4)
- Kate Fleetwood - additional dialogue (track 4)
- Garrett Nash - vocals (track 5)
- Hal Ritson - additional engineering and programming

== Charts ==
Chart (2016)	Peak position
Australian Albums (ARIA)	44
Irish Albums (IRMA)	43
New Zealand Heatseekers Albums (RMNZ)	3
UK Albums (Official Charts)	153
US Billboard 200	104
