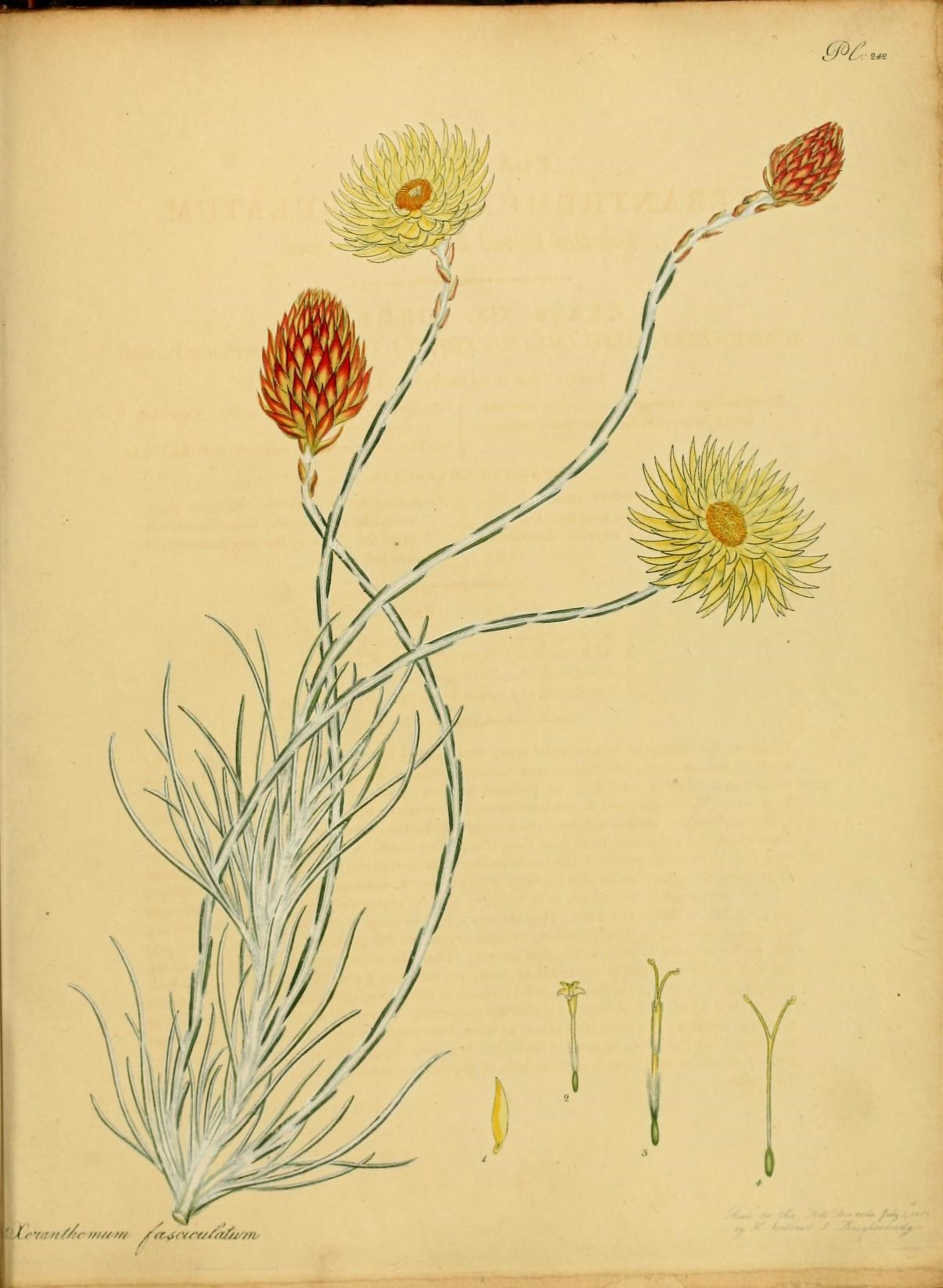

Scientific classification
- Kingdom: Plantae
- Clade: Tracheophytes
- Clade: Angiosperms
- Clade: Eudicots
- Clade: Asterids
- Order: Asterales
- Family: Asteraceae
- Genus: Edmondia
- Species: E. fasciculata

Binomial name
- Edmondia fasciculata (Andrews) Hilliard, (1983)

Synonyms
- Aphelexis fasciculata D.Don; Helichrysum fasciculatum Willd.; Helipterum fasciculatum DC.; Xeranthemum fasciculatum Andrews

= Edmondia fasciculata =

Species of flowering plant

Edmondia fasciculata is a shrub that only grows to 30 cm tall. The species is endemic to the Northern Cape and Western Cape where it is found from Kamiesberge, the Cederberg to the Riviersonderend Mountains. The plant flowers from September to January. The species is part of the fynbos.
