= Vertigo World Tour =

2018 concert tour by Eden

- World tour by Eden
- Associated album: Vertigo
- Start date: March 1, 2018
- End date: November 27, 2018
- Legs: 3
- No. of shows: 50 in North America; 12 in Europe; 5 in Oceania; 67 Total
- Website: iameden.eu/tour

Eden concert chronology
- Futurebound Tour (2016); Vertigo World Tour (2018); No Future Tour (2020)

The Vertigo World Tour was Irish recording artist Eden's third concert tour, supporting his debut studio album Vertigo. The tour began March 2018 in North America and ended in Europe in November 2018.

== Background ==
To accompany the release of "Gold," Eden released the dates for the tour on November 10, 2017.

== Set list ==
This set list is representative of the Santa Ana show on March 9, 2018. It does not necessarily represent all dates throughout the tour.

1. "wrong"
2. "take care"
3. "start//end"
4. "wings"
5. "icarus"
6. "lost//found"
7. "crash"
8. "about time"
9. "gold"
10. "nowhere else"
11. "forever//over"
12. "Fumes"
13. "float"
14. "stutter"
15. "End Credits"
16. "wonder"
17. "rock + roll"
18. "love; not wrong (brave)
19. "falling in reverse"

== Shows ==
List of concerts showing date, city, country, venue, and opening act
Date	City	Country	Venue	Opening act	Attendance	Revenue
Leg 1 - North America
March 1, 2018	Houston	United States	White Oak Music Hall	VÉRITÉ	—N/a	—N/a
March 2, 2018	Austin	United States	Scoot Inn	VÉRITÉ	975 / 975	$19,525
March 3, 2018	Dallas	United States	Trees Dallas	VÉRITÉ	—N/a	—N/a
March 6, 2018	Phoenix	United States	The Crescent Ballroom	VÉRITÉ	—N/a	—N/a
March 7, 2018	San Diego	United States	House of Blues	VÉRITÉ	—N/a	—N/a
March 9, 2018	Santa Ana	United States	The Observatory	VÉRITÉ	—N/a	—N/a
March 10, 2018	Los Angeles	United States	The Fonda Theatre	VÉRITÉ	—N/a	—N/a
March 13, 2018	San Francisco	United States	Regency Center	VÉRITÉ	—N/a	—N/a
March 15, 2018	Portland	United States	The Hawthrone Theatre	VÉRITÉ	—N/a	—N/a
March 16, 2018	Seattle	United States	The Showbox	VÉRITÉ	—N/a	—N/a
March 19, 2018	Salt Lake City	United States	Grand @ The Complex	VÉRITÉ	—N/a	—N/a
March 20, 2018	Denver	United States	Gothic Theatre	VÉRITÉ	—N/a	—N/a
March 22, 2018	Minneapolis	United States	The Cedar Cultural Center	VÉRITÉ	—N/a	—N/a
March 23, 2018	Milwaukee	United States	The Rave/Eagles Club	VÉRITÉ	—N/a	—N/a
March 24, 2018	Chicago	United States	House of Blues	VÉRITÉ	—N/a	—N/a
March 26, 2018	Detroit	United States	Saint Andrew's Hall, Detroit	VÉRITÉ	—N/a	—N/a
March 28, 2018	Toronto	Canada	Danforth Music Hall	VÉRITÉ	—N/a	—N/a
March 29, 2018	Montreal	Canada	Corona Theatre	VÉRITÉ	847 / 847	$18,425
April 2, 2018	Boston	United States	House of Blues	VÉRITÉ	—N/a	—N/a
April 4, 2018	New York City	United States	Irving Plaza	VÉRITÉ	—N/a	—N/a
April 5, 2018	New York City	United States	Irving Plaza	VÉRITÉ	—N/a	—N/a
April 6, 2018	Philadelphia	United States	Union Transfer	VÉRITÉ	—N/a	—N/a
April 7, 2018	Washington, D.C.	United States	9:30 Club	VÉRITÉ	1,200 / 1,200	$24,000
April 10, 2018	Pittsburgh	United States	Stage AE	VÉRITÉ	400 / 400	$7,200
April 11, 2018	Columbus	United States	Newport Music Hall	VÉRITÉ	1,406 / 1,406	$25,324
April 12, 2018	Nashville	United States	Mercy Lounge	VÉRITÉ	—N/a	—N/a
April 14, 2018	Atlanta	United States	Variety Playhouse	VÉRITÉ	—N/a	—N/a
Leg 2 - Europe
April 24, 2018	Dublin	Ireland	Olympia Theatre	Crooked Colours	—N/a	—N/a
April 25, 2018	Glasgow	Scotland	Oran Mor	Crooked Colours	—N/a	—N/a
April 27, 2018	Manchester	England	The Ritz	Crooked Colours	—N/a	—N/a
April 28, 2018	Birmingham	England	Digbeth Institute	Crooked Colours	—N/a	—N/a
April 30, 2018	London	England	O2 Forum	Crooked Colours	—N/a	—N/a
May 2, 2018	Antwerp	Belgium	Trix Hall	Crooked Colours	—N/a	—N/a
May 3, 2018	Amsterdam	Netherlands	Melkweg	Crooked Colours	—N/a	—N/a
May 4, 2018	Paris	France	Le Trabendo	Crooked Colours	—N/a	—N/a
May 6, 2018	Hamburg	Germany	Große Freiheit 36	Crooked Colours	—N/a	—N/a
May 7, 2018	Berlin	Germany	Festsaal Kreuzberg	Crooked Colours	—N/a	—N/a
May 9, 2018	Copenhagen	Denmark	Pumpehuset	Crooked Colours	—N/a	—N/a
May 10, 2018	Stockholm	Sweden	Debaser Strand	Crooked Colours	—N/a	—N/a
Leg 3 - Oceania
June 20, 2018	Auckland	New Zealand	The Power Station	Nakita	—N/a	—N/a
June 22, 2018	Brisbane	Australia	256 Wickham	ALTA	—N/a	—N/a
June 23, 2018	Sydney	Australia	Metro Theater	ALTA	—N/a	—N/a
June 24, 2018	Melbourne	Australia	170 Russel	ALTA	—N/a	—N/a
June 26, 2018	Perth	Australia	Capitol	Priscilla	—N/a	—N/a
Leg 4 - North America
October 2, 2018	Vancouver	Canada	Vogue Theatre	Harlequin Gold	—N/a	—N/a
October 3, 2018	Portland	United States	Crystal Ballroom	Kacy Hill	—N/a	—N/a
October 5, 2018	Chico	United States	Senator Theatre	Kacy Hill	—N/a	—N/a
October 6, 2018	Sacramento	United States	Ace of Spades	Kacy Hill	—N/a	—N/a
October 9, 2018	Santa Cruz	United States	The Catalyst	Kacy Hill	—N/a	—N/a
October 10, 2018	Los Angeles	United States	The Theatre of Ace Hotel	Kacy Hill	—N/a	—N/a
October 12, 2018	Phoenix	United States	The Van Buren	Kacy Hill	—N/a	—N/a
October 13, 2018	Albuquerque	United States	Sunshine Theater	Kacy Hill	—N/a	—N/a
October 15, 2018	Denver	United States	Ogden Theatre	Kacy Hill	—N/a	—N/a
October 18, 2018	Kansas City	United States	The Truman	Kacy Hill	—N/a	—N/a
October 19, 2018	St. Louis	United States	The Ready Room	Kacy Hill	—N/a	—N/a
October 20, 2018	Chicago	United States	Riviera Theatre	Kacy Hill	—N/a	—N/a
October 23, 2018	Indianapolis	United States	Deluxe at Old National Centre	Sasha Sloan	—N/a	—N/a
October 24, 2018	Nashville	United States	Marathon Music Works	Sasha Sloan	—N/a	—N/a
October 26, 2018	Fort Lauderdale	United States	Culture Room	Sasha Sloan	—N/a	—N/a
October 27, 2018	Orlando	United States	The Plaza Live	Sasha Sloan	—N/a	—N/a
October 30, 2018	Charleston	United States	Music Farm	Sasha Sloan	—N/a	—N/a
October 31, 2018	Charlotte	United States	The Fillmore	Sasha Sloan	—N/a	—N/a
November 2, 2018	Pittsburgh	United States	Stage AE	Sasha Sloan	—N/a	—N/a
November 3, 2018	Baltimore	United States	Rams Head Live!	Sasha Sloan	—N/a	—N/a
November 4, 2018	New Haven	United States	Toad's Place	Sasha Sloan	—N/a	—N/a
November 6, 2018	Providence	United States	Fete Music Hall	Sasha Sloan	—N/a	—N/a
November 9, 2018	Brooklyn	United States	Brooklyn Steel	Sasha Sloan	—N/a	—N/a
Leg 5 - Europe
November 18, 2018	Frankfurt	Germany	Batschkapp	Au/Ra	—N/a	—N/a
November 20, 2018	Cologne	Germany	Live Music Hall	Au/Ra	—N/a	—N/a
November 21, 2018	Paris	France	YOYO	Au/Ra	—N/a	—N/a
November 22, 2018	Utrecht	Netherlands	TivoliVredenburg	Au/Ra	—N/a	—N/a
November 24, 2018	Leeds	England	University of Leeds Refectory	Au/Ra	—N/a	—N/a
November 25, 2018	London	England	O2 Brixton Academy	Au/Ra	—N/a	—N/a
November 27, 2018	Dublin	Ireland	Olympia Theatre	Au/Ra	—N/a	—N/a
