= Everlast (disambiguation) =

Everlast may refer to:

- Everlast (brand), a manufacturer of boxing equipment
- Everlast Gyms, a fitness centre chain in the United Kingdom
- Everlast (musician) (born 1969), an American hip hop MC and singer

== See also ==
- Everlasting (disambiguation)
