= Wake Up (Paige Armstrong album) =

Studio album by Paige Armstrong
- Released: October 6, 2009
- Recorded: 2009
- Genre: Christian rock, hard rock
- Length: 36:58
- Label: Whiplash
- Producer: Chris Omartian, Brian Hitt

Professional ratings
Review scores
Source	Rating
Jesus Freak Hideout	3.5/5 stars
Christian Music Review	(8.9/10)

Wake Up is the debut album by the American Christian rock artist Paige Armstrong. The album, produced by Chris Omartian and Brian Hitt, was released on October 6, 2009 under Whiplash Records (though Armstrong is part of the iShine family) and marks the beginning of Armstrong's professional career after her struggle with cancer. Unlike other iShine artists, Armstrong's album Wake Up boasts a hard rock sound, with guitar solos, profound bass, and occasional vocals, as opposed to the normal pop sound performed by other iShine artists.

== Track listing ==
All tracks are written by Paige Armstrong.

No.	Title	Writer(s)	Length
1.	"Episode"	Paige Armstrong, Chris Omartian, Chelsea Perry	3:57
2.	"Apathy"	Paige Armstrong, Brian Hitt	2:51
3.	"Come Alive"	Paige Armstrong, Matthew Ludwikowski, Diane Sheets	3:31
4.	"I Say"	Paige Armstrong, Chris Omartian	3:55
5.	"Wake Up"	Paige Armstrong, Tiffany Arbuckle Lee, Matt Bronleewe	2:53
6.	"Thoroughly Complete"	Paige Armstrong	2:51
7.	"Lights Burn Out"	Paige Armstrong, Brian Hitt	3:27
8.	"I Dare You"	Paige Armstrong, Brian Hitt	3:05
9.	"The Story Song"	Paige Armstrong, Tiffany Arbuckle Lee, Luke Sheets	2:53
10.	"Airbrushed Magazines"	Paige Armstrong, Matthew Ludwikowski, Chris Omartian	3:05
11.	"Unbreak Me"	Paige Armstrong, Matthew Ludwikowski, Brian Hitt	4:31

== Music videos ==
- "Wake Up" feat. Our Heart's Hero
