= End Credits (EP) =

EP by Eden
- Released: 8 August 2015
- Recorded: Dublin
- Genre: Pop; indie pop; indietronica
- Length: 25:50
- Label: MCMXCV; Seeking Blue Records
- Producer: Jonathon Ng

Eden chronology
End Credits (2015)	I Think You Think Too Much of Me (2016)

Singles from End Credits
- 1. "Nocturne" Released: 26 June 2015; 2. "Gravity" Released: 15 July 2015; 3. "End Credits" Released: 31 July 2015

End Credits is the debut EP by Irish electronic musician Eden. It was released worldwide on 8 August 2015 through both his own label MCMXCV, as well as UK based label Seeking Blue Records. The album was produced and recorded in Dublin during spring 2015 and contains seven tracks spanning approximately 26-minutes. The tracks of the EP have accumulated more than 14 million plays in total on SoundCloud.

== Background and recording ==
Production of End Credits began in Dublin after Jonathon changed his alias from The Eden Project to Eden. It was written and recorded between April and July 2015. Irish vocalist Leah Kelly is featured on the title track.

== Artwork ==
Each track on End Credits features individual cover art that uses photography by JSaulsky Photo. The artwork follows a camera-film format throughout and depicts railroad tracks near American neighborhoods.

== Track listing ==
All songs were composed by Jonathon Ng.

No.	Title	Length
1.	"02:09"	4:11
2.	"End Credits" (featuring Leah Kelly)	4:00
3.	"Gravity"	3:50
4.	"Nocturne"	3:17
5.	"Interlude"	2:44
6.	"Wake Up"	4:39
7.	"catch me if you can" (Bonus Track)	3:09
Total length:		25:50

== Personnel ==
- Jonathon Ng – guitar, drums, vocals, piano, sound design, production, mixing, engineering, programming, string arrangement
- Leah Kelly – vocals (track 2)
