= Unlearning =

Studio album by Matt Brouwer
- Released: April 5, 2005
- Recorded: Los Angeles, CA
- Genre: CCM, alternative CCM
- Label: Black Shoe Records
- Producer: Ian Christian Nickus

Matt Brouwer chronology
Imagerical (2001)	Unlearning (2005)	Where's Our Revolution (2009)

Unlearning is the second studio album by Canadian Singer/Songwriter Matt Brouwer. It was released independently in February 2005 on Brouwer's website and in digital distribution and later in stores through various distribution avenues. It's been hailed by critics as Brouwer's most honest and intimate recording to date. The album was well received by Brouwer's audience and the single "I Shall Believe" charted in the top 30 on Billboard's Christian songs chart in 2006.

== Track listing ==
#	Title	Length	Composer
1.	"A Simple Plan"	3:47	Matt Brouwer, Joe Degelia
2.	"Here I Am Again"	4:42	Matt Brouwer, David M. Edwards
3.	"Surrender"	4:40	Matt Brouwer
4.	"Unlearning"	4:55	Matt Brouwer
5.	"Home"	5:10	Matt Brouwer
6.	"Unfamiliar"	3:54	Matt Brouwer
7.	"If You Stay"	5:56	Matt Brouwer
8.	"I Shall Believe"	4:48	Sheryl Crow, Bill Bottrell
9.	"You Are"	4:36	Matt Brouwer, Donna Stuart
10.	"Why Can't We Be Honest"	5:22	Matt Brouwer
11.	"With Me And You"	3:21	Matt Brouwer
12.	"Redemption Hymn"	4:33	Matt Brouwer

== Charts ==
2006	"I Shall Believe" - U.S. Billboard Hot Christian Songs	#21
