= Stormie Omartian =

American Christian writer (born 1942)

- Born: Virginia J. Sherk; September 16, 1942 (age 83); Scottsbluff, Nebraska, U.S.
- Occupations: Author, actress, singer
- Spouse: Michael Omartian (m. 1973)
- Children: 2
- Writing career
- Genre: Christian literature
- Website: www.stormieomartian.com

Stormie Omartian (/oʊˈmɑːrtiən/; born September 16, 1942) is an American Christian author. She is married to Michael Omartian, with whom she recorded five musical albums before she launched her writing career.

== Early career ==
Omartian aspired to be a singer and actress at a young age. While still in college at UCLA, she started work as a singer, dancer, and actress, appearing in several professional theatrical productions in California and later on The Dean Martin Show, The Smothers Brothers Comedy Hour, The Mac Davis Show, and The Glen Campbell Goodtime Hour, along with many other roles. She worked as a backup singer for Glen Campbell, Neil Diamond, Ray Charles, The Imperials, and other well-known artists. She also sang with the Norman Luboff Choir and toured with The Sandpipers. The duo Stormie & Sunny released a pop single in 1967 titled "All The Warm Is Gone", but it did not make the charts.

== Recordings ==
Omartian and her husband have written hundreds of songs, including the Christian musical Child of the Promise. They have released several singles and albums containing familiar worship songs plus original music arranged and produced by Michael Omartian, and multiple audiobooks including The Prayer that Changes Everything.

== Books ==
Stormie Omartian has sold more than 28 million copies of her series of Christian-oriented books worldwide. She has written over 50 books.

In May 2002, The Power of a Praying Wife broke a 21-year-old industry record by claiming the top spot on the Christian Booksellers Association bestsellers list for 27 consecutive months, selling over eight million copies. The Power of a Praying Husband has sold over 1,500,000 copies. The Power of a Praying Parent has sold over two million copies, and The Power of a Praying Woman has sold over 1,600,000 copies.

== Omartian.net ==
In July 2014, Omartian announced that she and her daughter-in-law Paige Omartian would be launching a new online community called Omartian.net (now defunct). This online community gave its members an opportunity to receive exclusive, members-only content from Stormie and Paige.

== Personal life ==
Born in 1942 in Nebraska to Herbert Richard and Virginia Faith (Campbell) Sherk, Omartian was raised on a small farm in eastern Wyoming before moving with her family to Compton, California at age eight. She has a sister, Susan, 12 years younger.

In the early 1960s she had a romantic relationship with comedian Steve Martin when they were both aspiring theater performers at Knotts Berry Farm. He credited her with introducing him to philosophy and other topics that "reconfigured his thinking".

After a 1971 marriage to Michael Piano of the Sandpipers, she married Michael Omartian in 1973. They are the parents of two children, Christopher (b. 1976, wife Paige Omartian) and Amanda (b. 1981), plus a "spiritually adopted" ward, John Kendrick (b. 1979). The family has resided in the Nashville area since 1993.
