= Paige Omartian =

American singer-songwriter

- Born: Paige Armstrong; June 9, 1990 (age 36); Florida
- Origin: Nashville, Tennessee, U.S.
- Genres: Christian rock, hard rock
- Occupations: Singer-songwriter, tv host, speaker, and author
- Instruments: Guitar, vocals
- Years active: 2004–present
- Label: Whiplash
- Website: www.paigeomartian.com

Paige Omartian (née Armstrong, born June 9, 1990) is an American Christian rock singer-songwriter, speaker, and author. She is signed to Whiplash Records and has released one album, titled Wake Up, under that label. Armstrong is known for her feature on a Bath & Body Works holiday compilation album sponsored by the Make-A-Wish Foundation. Armstrong hosted iShine KNECT, a Christian tween show on TBN during its first two seasons.

== Early life ==
Omartian was born Paige Armstrong on June 9, 1990, in Florida to Gary and Donna Armstrong. She grew up in Doylestown, Pennsylvania.

=== Cancer ===
In the spring of 2001, Armstrong began experiencing pains in her legs. It was assumed by doctors that this was a result of growth, but she was later diagnosed with Ewing's sarcoma, a cancerous bone tumor, on her right leg. The tumor kept her hospitalized and she experienced many regular cancer symptoms, such as hair loss, trouble walking, and acid reflux disease, as she was unable to eat many foods.

During her treatment with chemotherapy, she began writing songs about the way she felt. She drew the attention of the Make-A-Wish Foundation, and they arranged for her to record a Bath & Body Works holiday CD in Nashville, Tennessee, with artists such as Stevie Wonder and Martina McBride. Armstrong was featured on national news programs such as Today and Extra. At the time of her appearance on The Today Show in 2005, Armstrong was in remission.

== Music career ==
Armstrong became a recording artist and host of the Christian tween and teen show iShine KNECT on Trinity Broadcasting Network in 2008.

Her debut album, Wake Up, was released on October 6, 2009 by Whiplash Records and promoted by iShine Records. The lyrical themes center around apathy and her hatred of it, as shown in the title track and the song "Apathy".

Unlike most iShine artists who prefer a pop sound, Omartian performs rock, with many of her songs featuring fast-paced guitar solos, loud bass performance, and occasionally harsh vocals. She refers to her musical style as "spunk rock".

== Personal life ==
On November 11, 2011, Armstrong married her record producer, Chris Omartian, in Nashville, Tennessee. He is the son of Grammy Award-winning producer Michael Omartian and best-selling author Stormie Omartian.

== Book ==
In August 2012, she released her first book with Harvest House Publishers, titled Wake Up, Generation.

== Filmography ==
Year	Title	Role	Notes
2009–11	iShine KNECT	Host / herself	TV series

== Discography ==
Released	Title	Label(s)
October 6, 2009	Wake Up	Whiplash Records

=== Video ===
- 2009: Sermonettes from Paige
