= No Future (album) =

Studio album by Eden
- Released: 14 February 2020
- Genres: alternative pop; alternative R&B; experimental pop
- Length: 54:00
- Labels: MCMXCV; Astralwerks
- Producer: Eden

Eden chronology
Vertigo (2018)	No Future (2020)	ICYMI (2022)

Singles from No Future
- 1. "Untitled" Released: 8 October 2019; 2. "Projector" Released: 25 October 2019; 3. "Love, Death, Distraction" Released: 6 December 2019; 4. "Isohel" Released: 10 January 2020

No Future (stylised in all lowercase) is the second studio album by Irish musician Eden, released on 14 February 2020 through the label MCMXCV and distributed by Astralwerks. The album features 19 tracks including the four singles "Untitled", "Projector", "Love, Death, Distraction" and "Isohel", which were released leading up to the album. The album is followed by the No Future Tour, which was supposed to visit North America and Europe but got cancelled due to the COVID-19 pandemic.

== Background and recording ==
Jonathon Ng hinted about a return to the electronic music genre through songs like 909 and stutter which was found in some of the singles in No Future. During the release of untitled Ng nodded its linked to climate change by stating that, “Whether we’re talking about a relationship or the state of the world, the most catastrophic thing doesn’t mean it’s all over. Things might shift, but it doesn’t have to be the last page of anyone’s book.”.

The second track "Love, Death, Distraction", according to Ng, is a response to the over-usage of social media by people instead of looking at their surroundings and immersing themselves in it while the track "Isohel" is about reminiscing about the past but not dwelling much into it.

== Videos ==
Ng produced four music videos for the tracks "Projector", "Good Morning", "Love, Death, Distraction" and "Isohel". The latter music video was shot and produced in Morocco with its arid desert plains as the backgrounds for both the music video whereas for "Good Morning" and "Love, Death, Distraction" they were shot in Morocco, and in projector it was shot in a studio due to its theme. The videos were all directed by Zhang + Knight—with the exception of "Good Morning", which was directed by Joey Brodnax—due to his previous works on the video "909" and "Float".

== Track listing ==
All tracks are written by Jonathan Ng.

No Future track listing
No.	Title	Length
1.	"Good Morning"	3:29
2.	"In"	0:31
3.	"Hertz"	3:18
4.	"Static"	0:48
5.	"Projector"	3:42
6.	"Love, Death, Distraction"	4:17
7.	"How To Sleep"	2:37
8.	"Calm Down"	2:35
9.	"Just Saying"	4:06
10.	"Fomo"	3:09
11.	"So Far So Good"	3:25
12.	"Isohel"	4:30
13.	"????"	2:59
14.	"Tides"	1:43
15.	"Rushing"	5:07
16.	"$treams"	3:20
17.	"2020"	3:31
18.	"Out"	0:42
19.	"Untitled"	3:36
Total length:		57:35

Notes

- Track titles are stylised in all lowercase letters.

== Personnel ==
- Eden – vocals, instrumentation,programming, production, mixing, mastering, engineering, art direction, design
- Tony Bisogno – production
- Joe Mortimer – art direction, design
- Drew Escriva – photography

== Charts ==
Sales chart performance for No Future
Chart (2020)	Peak position
Canadian Albums (Billboard)	26
US Billboard 200	26

== See also ==
- List of 2020 albums
