= No Future in the Past =

No Future in the Past may refer to:

- "No Future in the Past" (Vince Gill song), from the album I Still Believe in You
- "No Future in the Past" (Alan Parsons song), from the album The Time Machine
- "No Future in the Past" (Nâdiya song), from the album Électron Libre
