= Imagerical =

Studio album by Matt Brouwer
- Released: May 29, 2001
- Recorded: Alberta, Canada
- Genre: CCM, alternative CCM
- Label: Reunion
- Producer: Eldon Winter, Steve Rendall

Matt Brouwer chronology
Imagerical (2001)	Unlearning (2005)

Professional ratings
Review scores
Source	Rating
Christianity Today	4.5/5 stars

Imagerical is the debut album by Canadian singer and songwriter Matt Brouwer. It was released on Reunion Records on May 29, 2001, and received universal acclaim from the gospel music industry. Christianity Today hailed Brouwer as one of the Best New Artists of 2001 along with Katy Perry (known then as Katy Hudson). The album produced 2 top 10 Christian hits on CHR radio and sold well in the US and Canada. In 2002 the album was nominated for a Canadian JUNO Award for Best Gospel Album.

== Track listing ==
#	Title	Length	Composer
1.	"New Beginning"	4:28	Matt Brouwer, Jill Paquette, Eldon Winter
2.	"Imagerical"	4:44	Tim Yee, Matt Brouwer, Jill Paquette
3.	"Water"	4:54	Sean Hall, Matt Brouwer, Jill Paquette
4.	"Come And Be"	4:39	Matt Brouwer
5.	"Sanity"	4:41	Matt Brouwer
6.	"Breathe"	4:33	Matt Brouwer, Jill Paquette
7.	"Rivers Of Mercy"	5:23	Matt Brouwer, Tim Milner
8.	"A New Song"	3:23	Matt Brouwer
9.	"Lead"	3:54	Matt Brouwer
10.	"Consecrate"	4:04	Matt Brouwer
11.	"I Wanna See You"	4:11	Matt Brouwer
