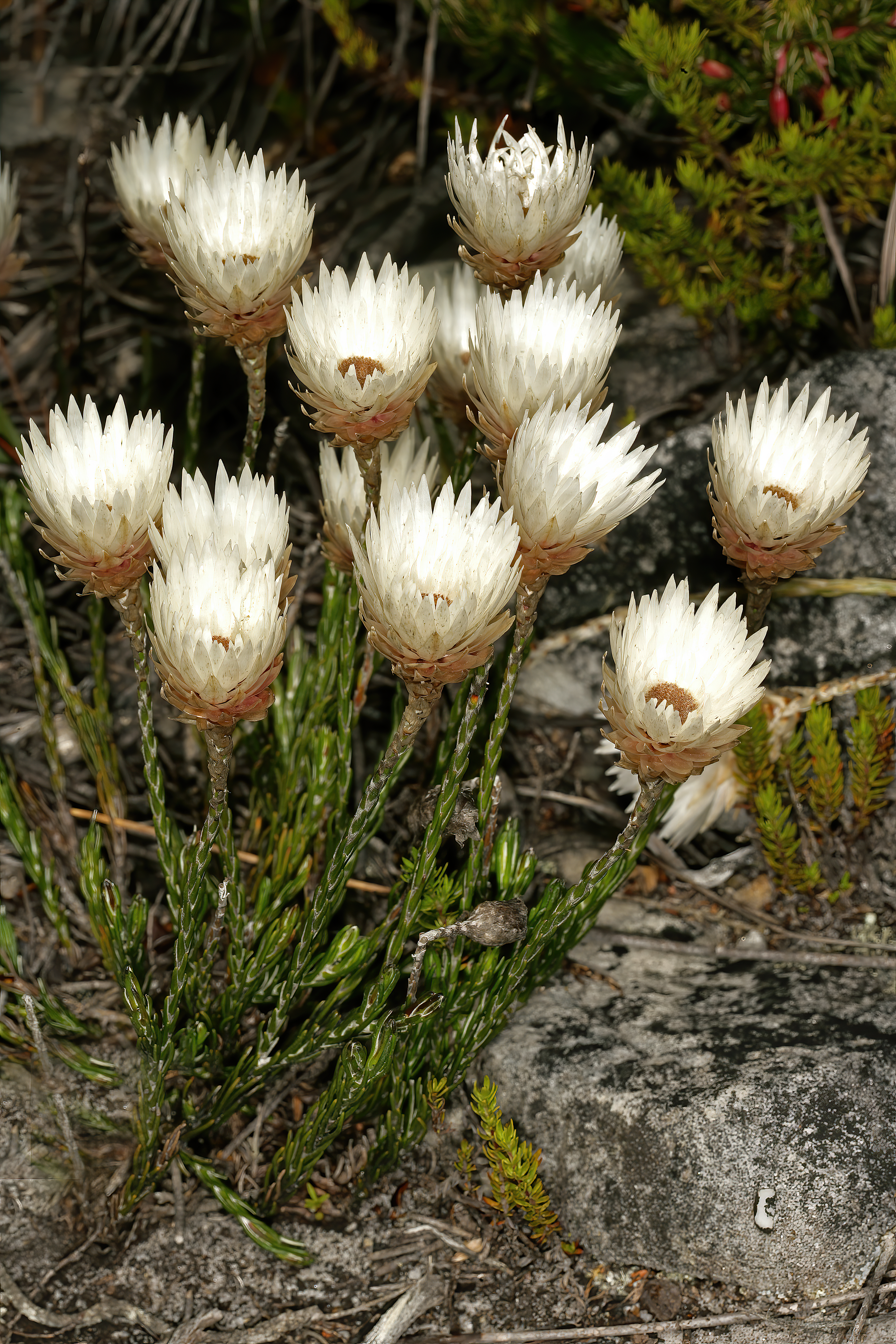
- Edmondia pinifolia

Scientific classification
- Kingdom: Plantae
- Clade: Tracheophytes
- Clade: Angiosperms
- Clade: Eudicots
- Clade: Asterids
- Order: Asterales
- Family: Asteraceae
- Subfamily: Asteroideae
- Tribe: Gnaphalieae
- Genus: Edmondia; Cass. 1818 not Cogn. 1881 (Cucurbitaceae)

= Edmondia (plant) =

Genus of flowering plants

Edmondia is a genus of plants in the family Asteraceae, endemic to the Fynbos shrublands in the Cape Province area of South Africa.

Species

- Edmondia fasciculata (Andrews) Hilliard
- Edmondia pinifolia (Lam.) Hilliard
- Edmondia sesamoides (L.) Hilliard
