= The Everlasting (role-playing game) =

Tabletop fantasy role-playing game

The Book of the Unliving
- Designers: Steve Brown
- Publishers: Visionary Entertainment Studios Inc
- Publication: 1997; 29 years ago
- Genres: Fantasy
- ISBN: 978-1887358064

The Everlasting is a role-playing game created by Steve Brown of Visionary Entertainment Studios Inc in the 1990s. It has six published books – The Book of the Unliving (1997), The Book of the Light (1998), The Book of the Spirit (1998), The Book of the Fantastical (2004), The Codex of Immortals (2004), and The Magician's Companion (2004).

== Premise ==
The Everlasting is based on several immortal races who struggle with an unknown force. Since Hiroshima and thereafter Tchernobyl, many seals are broken and "something" is coming.

These immortal races span a wide range of mythological beings from societies around the world. Steve Brown had done extensive research on these various types of mythological beings and incorporated different ideas and concepts from the different societies that these mythologies originate from. As an example, he included many different types of vampires from varying cultures around the world. Among the varying creatures and beings that players can take on the roles of in this RPG are the following:

- Angels
- Daevas
- Dead Souls
- Djinn
- Dragons
- Dwarves
- Elves
- Faeries
- Gargoyles
- Ghuls
- Manitou
- Orcs
- Osirians
- Possessed
- Questers
- Reanimates
- Revenants
- Vampires
- Wer

This game also heavily stresses the development of each player's own personal mythology, and encourages developing a meaningful and interesting story (to a degree beyond what is seen in most paper and dice RPGs). This goes as far as referring to the characters being played by the players as "Protagonists" and any creatures or other beings and humans that they must struggle against as "Antagonists" similar to what is commonly seen in literature.

== Publication history ==
The Everlasting is published by Visionary Entertainment Studios and written by Steve Brown. The system has four core books: The Book of the Unliving (1997), The Book of the Light (1998), The Book of the Spirit (1998), and The Book of the Fantastical (2004). There are also two supplement books available for the game: The Codex of Immortals (2004) and The Magician's Companion (2004).

=== Book of the Light ===
The Everlasting
Book of the Light
- Publishers: Visionary Entertainment Studios Inc
- Publication: 1998; 28 years ago
- Genres: Fantasy
- ISBN: 978-1887385015

Book of the Light is a 1998 role-playing game supplement for the series. It is a sourcebook presenting creatures from opposing sides of the immortal struggle in the setting.

== Reception ==
Lisa Padol of The Unspeakable Oath criticized the release structure of the role-playing game as "The Everlasting is being packaged as four games, each of which take place in the same world, but each of which can be played separately" – this not only results in "the reader" repurchasing "the same material over and over again", since the basic system is included in each book, but also the reader needs "to buy four books to get information on all of the races", "buy one book on generic supernatural information and another on magic". Padol thought it was "great" that The Everlasting offers multiple systems of play with "dice or cards", noting that she doubts "any game has yet offered as many as The Everlasting". However, she also highlighted that the presentation of these systems "is confusing, particularly for the new gamer", and did not understand why the author's preferred tarot deck system was presented "so late in each book". Padol commented that "the system rapidly gets far too complicated for my tastes" and highlighted that the first two volumes "are chock full of hideously pretentious, evangelistic, and occasionally downright creepy prose". She disagreed with reviews that preferred The Everlasting over White Wolf's World of Darkness game system, opining that "the painful fact is that The Everlasting could have been White Wolf done right" but "it takes a lot of digging to find" the "excellent ideas for a really kick-ass game" that are included in the first two books of the series.

The reviewer of the Book of the Light from the online second volume of Pyramid stated that "Now, this feels like a good roleplaying book. The bright, glossy color cover features an evocative bit of artwork that nevertheless isn't inappropriate for, say, a coffee table. The book has a nice heft to it, and is liberally sprinkled with illustrations. In fact, the artwork drew me towards this. With a wonderful mix of styles, ranging from European woodcuts to incredibly twisted modern horror pen and ink, it's a pretty book."

J Michael Tisdel, in a review of The Book of the Fantastical for the gaming magazine Fictional Reality, commented that The Everlasting "is non-traditional in that it is more of a story-telling system than a classic RPG", noting that it utilizes the "group storyteller approach" so "there may be a single storyteller who crafts the basic plot, conflict, and antagonists, or this may be a group effort". Tisdel opined that The Everlasting "is an excellent choice" for someone "looking for a less combat-oriented RPG system, more of a storytelling system" and that the four volumes "describe a interesting and unique campaign world. However, if your play style is more combat oriented, then this book will have little appeal to you".

== Reviews ==
- The Unspeakable Oath #16/17 (2001)
