= Till the Sunrise =

Till The Sunrise

Studio album by Matt Brouwer
- Released: February 28, 2012
- Recorded: Nashville, TN
- Genres: CCM, alternative CCM
- Label: Black Shoe Records
- Producer: Michael Omartian

Matt Brouwer chronology
A Merry Little Christmas (2010)	Till The Sunrise (2012)	Writing to Remember (2014)

Professional ratings
Review scores
Source	Rating
Crosswalk	5/5 stars
Alpha&Omega	5/5 stars
MusicScribe	4.5/5 stars

Till The Sunrise is the fourth studio album by Canadian Singer/Songwriter Matt Brouwer. The album was released on February 28, 2012. It was well received with many positive and glowing reviews. The album was nominated for 4 GMA Canada Covenant Awards including Pop/Contemporary Album of the Year in 2012 and song of the year nods (2012–2014). Till the Sunrise was also nominated in 2013 for Gospel Recording of the Year by the East Coast Music Awards, Contemporary Christian/Gospel Album of the Year by the Independent Music Awards and Inspirational Album of the year by Music Nova Scotia Awards. The song Ocean from the album won a GMA Canada Covenant Award for Inspirational Song of the Year.

== Track listing ==
#	Title	Length	Composer
1.	"Till The Sunrise"	4:10	Matt Brouwer
2.	"Tonight"	4:16	Matt Brouwer
3.	"Thornside"	3:22	Matt Brouwer, Jeff Somers
4.	"Ocean"	4:00	Matt Brouwer
5.	"Everlasting"	3:50	Matt Brouwer
6.	"One For Another"	3.51	Matt Brouwer, Jill Paquette DeZwaan
7.	"One In A Million"	2:57	Matt Brouwer, Jill Paquette DeZwaan
8.	"Someone Else's Arms"	3:28	Matt Brouwer, Jeff Somers
9.	"Wish You Were Here"	4:45	Matt Brouwer
10.	"Love Can Find A Way" with JJ Heller	4:01	Matt Brouwer, David Heller, JJ Heller
11.	"Outside Inside"	4:12	Matt Brouwer, Jeffrey Armstreet

== Awards ==
2012	Covenant Award - Inspirational song of the year	"Ocean"
