= Conchaspis capensis =

Scientific classification
- Kingdom: Animalia
- Phylum: Arthropoda
- Class: Insecta
- Order: Hemiptera
- Suborder: Sternorrhyncha
- Family: Conchaspididae
- Genus: Conchaspis
- Species: C. capensis

Binomial name
- Conchaspis capensis (Linnaeus, 1763)

Synonyms
- Coccus capensis Linnaeus, 1763; Conchaspis phylicae Mamet, 1954

Species of true bug

Conchaspis capensis is a species of scale insect from South Africa found on Metalasia muricata and Phylica species. It was originally described by Carl Linnaeus in his 1763 work Centuria Insectorum.

== Description ==
A number of characteristics differentiate Conchaspis capensis from other scale insects. The animals normally have three segments to the antennae, although there may be as many as five. The multilocular pores (the pores through which scale insects secrete the waxy scale) are found on segments 3 to 5 of the abdomen and sometimes on the sixth segment as well, but not the thorax; they are often arranged in clusters of 2–3 pores. The head and thorax are expanded on either side. There is also considerable reduction in the legs, with various segments being fused together.

== Distribution ==
Conchaspis capensis is only known to occur in South Africa.

== Host plants ==
C. capensis has been found on a range of host plants, belonging to two families. In the Rhamnaceae, several species of Phylica have acted as hosts, including Phylica axillaris, Phylica capitata, Phylica nervosa and Phylica stipularis, while in the Compositae (=Asteraceae), only Metalasia muricata has been recorded as a host for C. capensis, and this may refer to Metalasia densa, which was not differentiated from Metalasia muricata in Linnaeus' time.

== Taxonomy ==
Conchaspis capensis was first described by Carl Linnaeus as Coccus capensis, based on material he had been sent from the Cape of Good Hope by the province's governor, Ryk Tulbagh. It is unclear whether Tulbagh deliberately sent the scale insects, or whether they were merely attached to a plant which Tulbagh sent to Linnaeus.

Linnaeus' description appeared in Centuria Insectorum, a thesis defended by Linnaeus' student Boas Johansson. Conchaspis phylicae, described by Mamet in 1954, is a subjective synonym. C. capensis was moved to the genus Conchaspis by Yair Ben-Dov in 1981. The species has no common name.
