= Metalasia serrulata =

Scientific classification
- Kingdom: Plantae
- Clade: Tracheophytes
- Clade: Angiosperms
- Clade: Eudicots
- Clade: Asterids
- Order: Asterales
- Family: Asteraceae
- Genus: Metalasia
- Species: M. serrulata

Binomial name
- Metalasia serrulata P.O.Karis

Species of plant

Metalasia serrulata is a semi-shrub that is part of the Asteraceae family. The species is endemic to South Africa and occurs in the Western Cape in the Groot Winterhoek and the Witzenberg. The species is part of the fynbos and occurs at altitudes of 800-850 m. The species is threatened by invasive plants.
