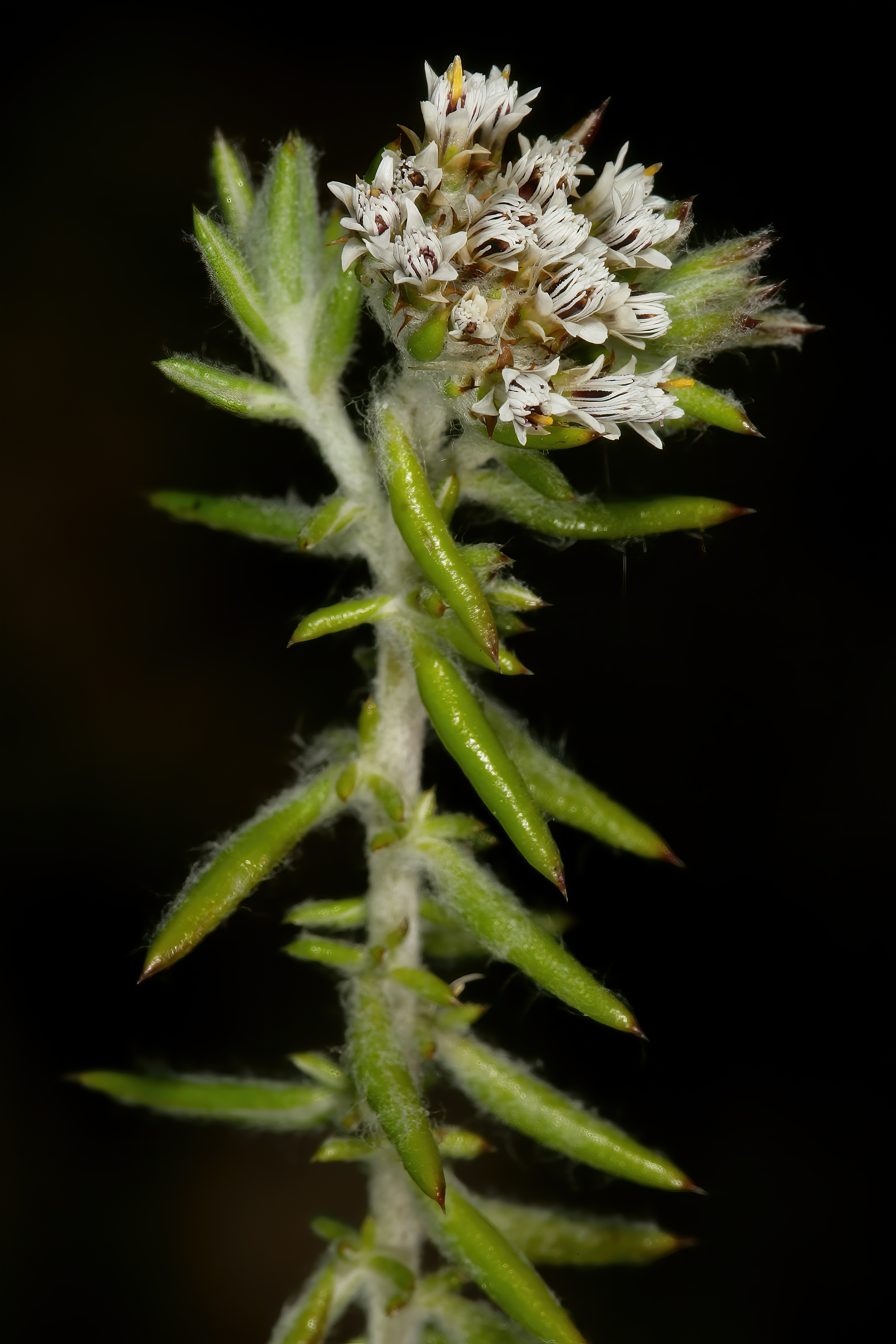

Scientific classification
- Kingdom: Plantae
- Clade: Tracheophytes
- Clade: Angiosperms
- Clade: Eudicots
- Clade: Asterids
- Order: Asterales
- Family: Asteraceae
- Genus: Metalasia
- Species: M. divergens

Binomial name
- Metalasia divergens (Thunb.) D.Don

Synonyms
- Gnaphalium divergens Thunb.; Helichrysum divergens (Thunb.) Less.

= Metalasia divergens =

Species of plant

Metalasia divergens is a flowering subshrub in the Asteraceae family. The species is endemic to the Western Cape. The plant occurs in the Cape Peninsula on the Karbonkelberg, Constantiaberg and the mountains between Kommetjie and Smitswinkelbaai. It grows on rocky slopes at altitudes of 50-1000 m and is part of the fynbos.

The species has two subspecies:

- Metalasia divergens subsp. divergens
- Metalasia divergens subsp. fusca P.O.Karis
