= Metalasia agathosmoides =

Scientific classification
- Kingdom: Plantae
- Clade: Tracheophytes
- Clade: Angiosperms
- Clade: Eudicots
- Clade: Asterids
- Order: Asterales
- Family: Asteraceae
- Genus: Metalasia
- Species: M. agathosmoides

Binomial name
- Metalasia agathosmoides Pillans

Species of plant

Metalasia agathosmoides is a semi-shrub that is part of the Asteraceae family. The species is endemic to South Africa and occurs in the Western Cape from the Nieuwoudts Pass and the Cederberg to the Bonteberg in the Worcester area. The species is part of the fynbos and grows at altitudes of 1100-1700 m.
