= Metalasia montana =

Scientific classification
- Kingdom: Plantae
- Clade: Tracheophytes
- Clade: Angiosperms
- Clade: Eudicots
- Clade: Asterids
- Order: Asterales
- Family: Asteraceae
- Genus: Metalasia
- Species: M. montana

Binomial name
- Metalasia montana P.O.Karis

Species of plant

Metalasia montana is a semi-shrub that is part of the Asteraceae family. The species is endemic to South Africa and occurs in the Western Cape on four mountain peaks in the Stettynsberge and Wemmershoekberge. It has a distribution area of 900 km^{2}. The species is part of the fynbos and is considered rare.
