= Metalasia capitata =

Scientific classification
- Kingdom: Plantae
- Clade: Tracheophytes
- Clade: Angiosperms
- Clade: Eudicots
- Clade: Asterids
- Order: Asterales
- Family: Asteraceae
- Genus: Metalasia
- Species: M. capitata

Binomial name
- Metalasia capitata (Lam.) Less.

Synonyms
- Gnaphalium capitatum Lam.; Metalasia bolusii L.Bolus

Species of plant

Metalasia capitata is a semi-shrub that is part of the Asteraceae family. The species is endemic to South Africa and occurs in the Western Cape between Piketberg and Paarl. It has a range of 5 715 km² and has already lost 30% of its habitat to urban development and crop cultivation over the past 60 years. The species is part of the fynbos.
