= Conchaspididae =

Scientific classification
- Kingdom: Animalia
- Phylum: Arthropoda
- Clade: Pancrustacea
- Class: Insecta
- Order: Hemiptera
- Suborder: Sternorrhyncha
- Superfamily: Coccoidea
- Family: Conchaspididae; Green, 1896

Genera
- Asceloconchaspis Williams, 1992; Conchaspis Cockerell, 1893; Fagisuga Lindinger, 1909; Paraconchaspis Mamet, 1959

Family of true bugs

Conchaspididae is a small family of scale insects known as false armoured scales because of their resemblance to Diaspididae (but not incorporating exuviae on their body).

== Description ==
Members of the family Conchaspididae secrete a waxy scale, in common with other scale insects, but the secreted scale does not include the exuviae.

== Ecology ==
Five of the 30 species are parasites on palms, but none are considered pests. Conchaspis cordiae infests mahogany trees and has been accidentally introduced to Florida from the Caribbean, but does not appear to cause serious damage.

== Taxonomic history ==
Carl Linnaeus described a single member of the family, now called Conchaspis capensis, in his Centuria Insectorum, but no further species were described until the 1890s. Eleven of the 29 species currently recognised were insects from Madagascar, described by Raymond Mamet. This probably reflects the sampling effort rather than a particular diversity of conchaspidid scale insects on Madagascar.

Conchaspididae was first recognised as a subfamily of the family Coccidae, but it was raised to the rank of family by Gordon Floyd Ferris in 1937.
