= Metalasia quinqueflora =

Scientific classification
- Kingdom: Plantae
- Clade: Tracheophytes
- Clade: Angiosperms
- Clade: Eudicots
- Clade: Asterids
- Order: Asterales
- Family: Asteraceae
- Genus: Metalasia
- Species: M. quinqueflora

Binomial name
- Metalasia quinqueflora DC.

Species of plant

Metalasia quinqueflora is a semi-shrub belonging to the Asteraceae family. The species is endemic to South Africa and occurs in the Western Cape, from the Hottentots Holland Mountains and Grabouw in the north to Betty's Bay and Kleinmond in the south. The plant is part of the fynbos and occurs at altitudes of 0-400 m.
