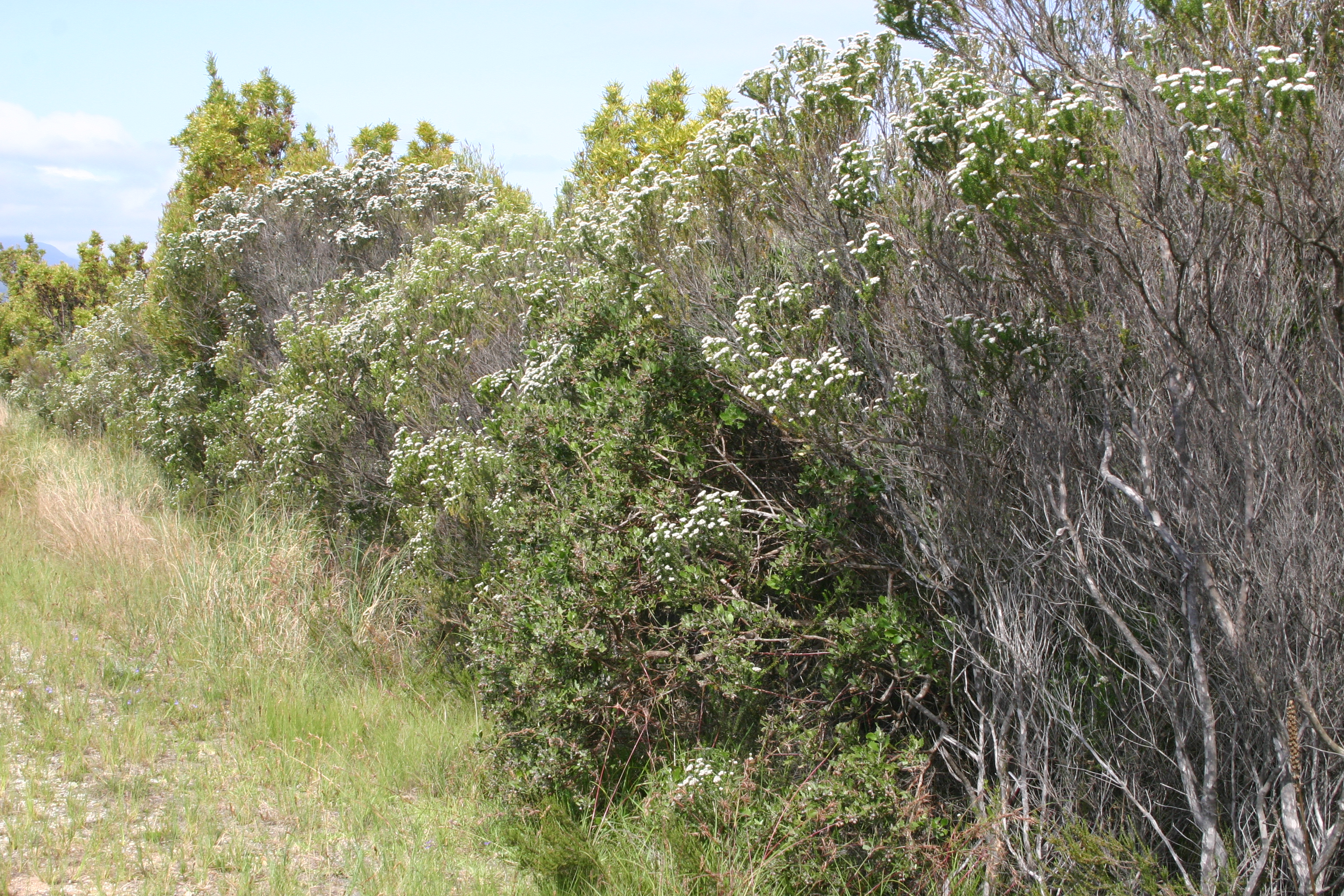
- Metalasia muricata

Scientific classification
- Kingdom: Plantae
- Clade: Tracheophytes
- Clade: Angiosperms
- Clade: Eudicots
- Clade: Asterids
- Order: Asterales
- Family: Asteraceae
- Subfamily: Asteroideae
- Tribe: Gnaphalieae
- Genus: Metalasia; R.Br.

Synonyms
- Erythropogon DC.; Endoleuca Cass.

= Metalasia =

Genus of flowering plants

Metalasia is a genus of African flowering plants in the tribe Gnaphalieae within the family Asteraceae.

Species

- Metalasia acuta
- Metalasia adunca
- Metalasia agathosmoides
- Metalasia albescens
- Metalasia alfredii
- Metalasia aurea
- Metalasia bodkinii
- Metalasia brevifolia
- Metalasia calcicola
- Metalasia capitata
- Metalasia cephalotes
- Metalasia compacta
- Metalasia confusa
- Metalasia cymbifolia
- Metalasia densa
- Metalasia distans
- Metalasia divergens
- Metalasia dregeana
- Metalasia eburnea
- Metalasia erectifolia
- Metalasia erubescens
- Metalasia fastigiata
- Metalasia formosa
- Metalasia galpinii
- Metalasia helmei
- Metalasia humilis
- Metalasia inversa
- Metalasia juniperoides
- Metalasia lichtensteinii
- Metalasia luteola
- Metalasia massonii
- Metalasia montana
- Metalasia muraltiifolia
- Metalasia muricata
- Metalasia namaquana
- Metalasia octoflora
- Metalasia oligocephala
- Metalasia pallida
- Metalasia phillipsii
- Metalasia plicata
- Metalasia pulchella
- Metalasia pulcherrima
- Metalasia pungens
- Metalasia quinqueflora
- Metalasia rhoderoides
- Metalasia riparia
- Metalasia rogersii
- Metalasia seriphiifolia
- Metalasia serrata
- Metalasia serrulata
- Metalasia strictifolia
- Metalasia tenuifolia
- Metalasia tenuis
- Metalasia tricolor
- Metalasia tristis
- Metalasia trivialis
- Metalasia umbelliformis
