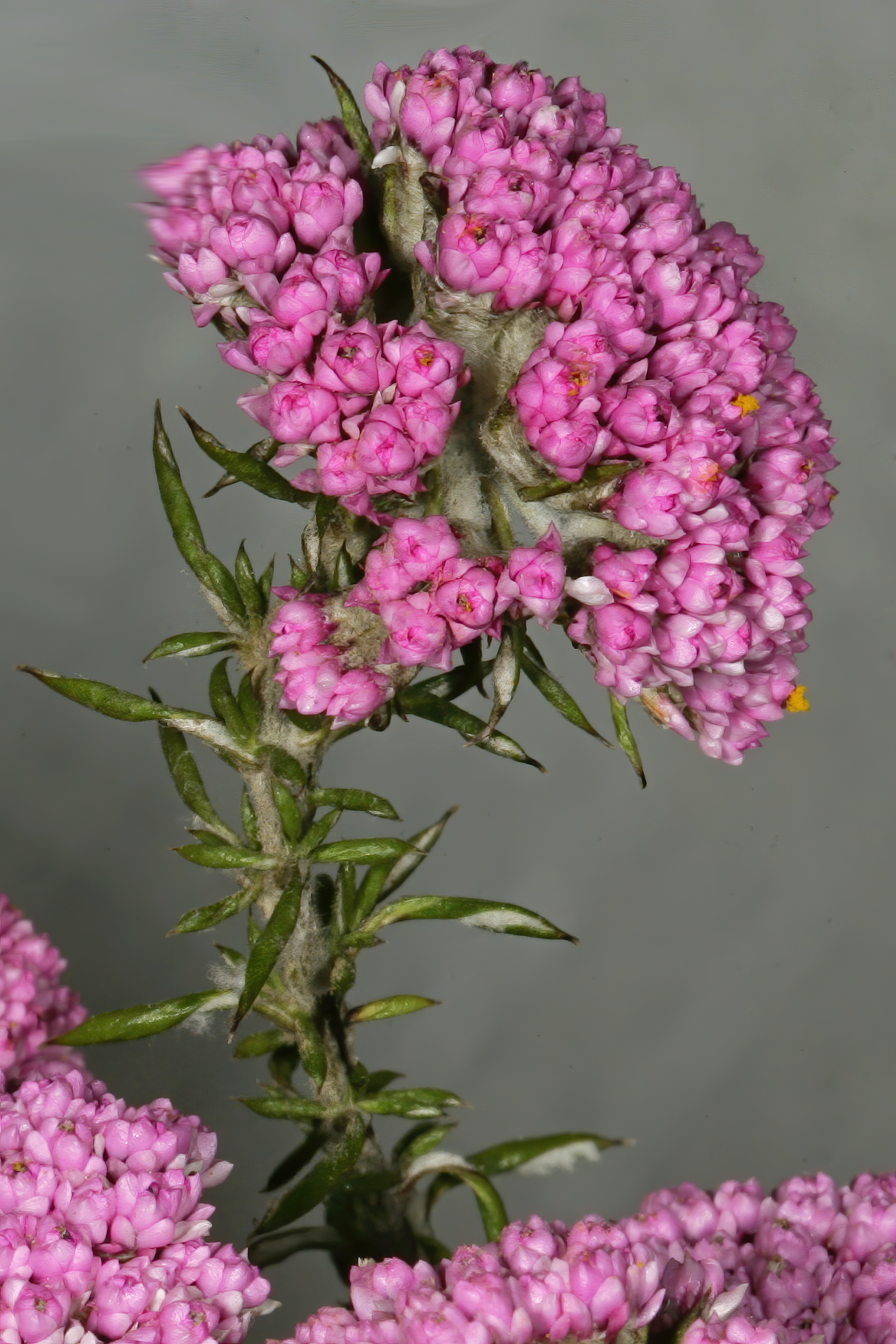

Scientific classification
- Kingdom: Plantae
- Clade: Tracheophytes
- Clade: Angiosperms
- Clade: Eudicots
- Clade: Asterids
- Order: Asterales
- Family: Asteraceae
- Genus: Metalasia
- Species: M. fastigiata

Binomial name
- Metalasia fastigiata (Thunb.) D.Don

Synonyms
- Gnaphalium fastigiatum Thunb.; Metalasia concinna Harv.; Metalasia speciosa Hutch.

= Metalasia fastigiata =

Species of plant

Metalasia fastigiata is a flowering semi-shrub that is part of the Asteraceae family. The species is endemic to the Western Cape. The plant occurs from Calvinia and Nieuwoudtville, southwards to Wellington. It is especially abundant in the Olifants River Mountains and around Piketberg.

It grows in sandy soil from 700-1100 m and is part of the fynbos.
