= Metalasia pulchella =

Scientific classification
- Kingdom: Plantae
- Clade: Tracheophytes
- Clade: Angiosperms
- Clade: Eudicots
- Clade: Asterids
- Order: Asterales
- Family: Asteraceae
- Genus: Metalasia
- Species: M. pulchella

Binomial name
- Metalasia pulchella (Cass.) P.O.Karis

Synonyms
- Endoleuca pulchella Cass.; Metalasia caespitosa

Species of flowering plant

Metalasia pulchella is a flowering shrub belonging to the Asteraceae family. The species is endemic to South Africa and occurs in the Western Cape in the Cape Peninsula and the Cape Flats. It has a range of 244 km² and there are ten to fifteen populations remaining. The remaining populations outside the protected areas are declining due to urban development, invasive plants and wildfires. The plant is part of the fynbos and grows at altitudes of 100–200 m.
