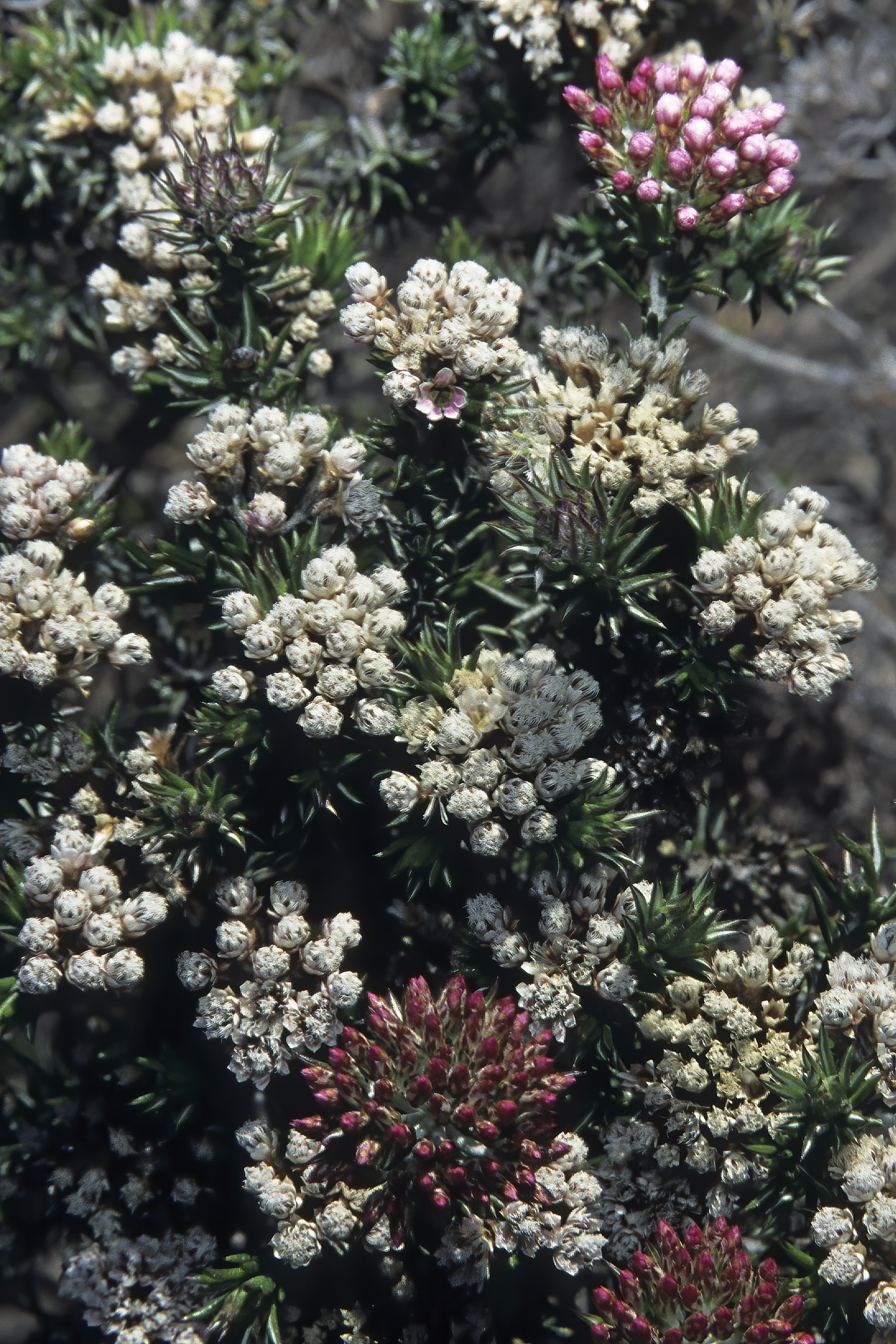

Scientific classification
- Kingdom: Plantae
- Clade: Tracheophytes
- Clade: Angiosperms
- Clade: Eudicots
- Clade: Asterids
- Order: Asterales
- Family: Asteraceae
- Genus: Metalasia
- Species: M. tricolor

Binomial name
- Metalasia tricolor Pillans

= Metalasia tricolor =

Species of plant

Metalasia tricolor is a flowering subshrub that is part of the Asteraceae family. The species is endemic to the Western Cape and occurs on the Rooiberg.

It grows on rocky slopes and is part of the fynbos.
