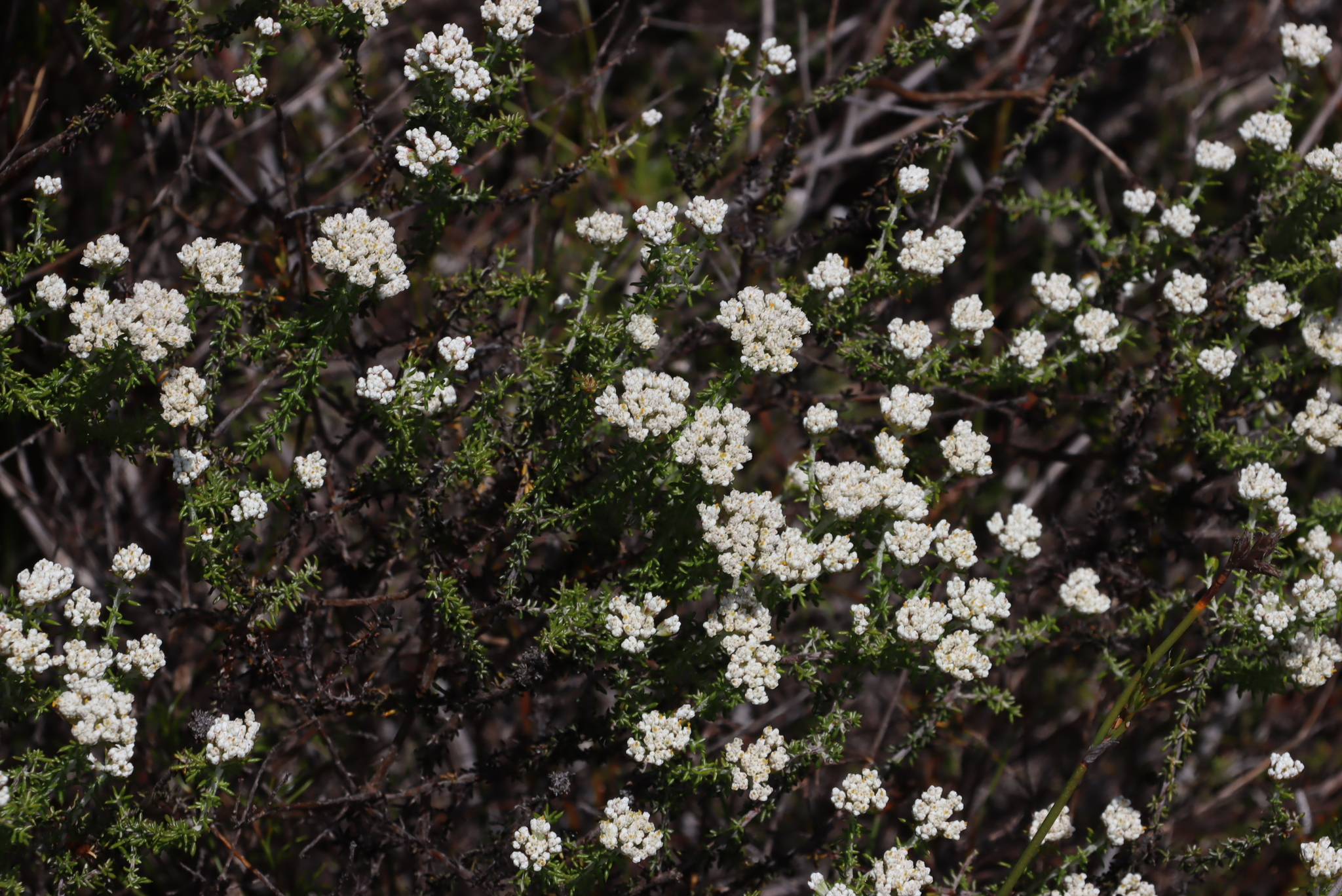

Scientific classification
- Kingdom: Plantae
- Clade: Embryophytes
- Clade: Tracheophytes
- Clade: Angiosperms
- Clade: Eudicots
- Clade: Asterids
- Order: Asterales
- Family: Asteraceae
- Genus: Metalasia
- Species: M. brevifolia

Binomial name
- Metalasia brevifolia D.Don

= Metalasia brevifolia =

Species of plant

Metalasia brevifolia is a flowering subshrub that is part of the Asteraceae family. The species is endemic to the Eastern Cape and the Western Cape. It occurs from Nieuwoudtville southwards to the Cape Peninsula and eastwards to Gqeberha. It grows from 0 - 1500 m and is part of the fynbos.
