= Metalasia cymbifolia =

Scientific classification
- Kingdom: Plantae
- Clade: Tracheophytes
- Clade: Angiosperms
- Clade: Eudicots
- Clade: Asterids
- Order: Asterales
- Family: Asteraceae
- Genus: Metalasia
- Species: M. cymbifolia

Binomial name
- Metalasia cymbifolia Harv.

Synonyms
- Metalasia decora L.Bolus

Species of plant

Metalasia cymbifolia is a flowering subshrub that is part of the Asteraceae family. The species is endemic to the Western Cape and occurs in the Kleinrivier and Babilonstoring Mountains. It grows from 200 - 1900 m and is part of the fynbos.
