= Metalasia plicata =

Scientific classification
- Kingdom: Plantae
- Clade: Tracheophytes
- Clade: Angiosperms
- Clade: Eudicots
- Clade: Asterids
- Order: Asterales
- Family: Asteraceae
- Genus: Metalasia
- Species: M. plicata

Binomial name
- Metalasia plicata P.O.Karis

Species of flowering plant

Metalasia plicata is a semi-shrub belonging to the Asteraceae family. The species is endemic to South Africa and occurs in the Western Cape from Houwhoek to Bredasdorp and Heidelberg. It has a range of 5 702 km² and there are six small, fragmented populations remaining after the species lost 87% of its habitat to crop cultivation. The remaining plants are threatened by invasive species and overgrazing. The plant is part of the fynbos and renosterveld.
