= Metalasia inversa =

Scientific classification
- Kingdom: Plantae
- Clade: Tracheophytes
- Clade: Angiosperms
- Clade: Eudicots
- Clade: Asterids
- Order: Asterales
- Family: Asteraceae
- Genus: Metalasia
- Species: M. inversa

Binomial name
- Metalasia inversa P.O.Karis

Species of plant

Metalasia inversa is a semi-shrub that is part of the Asteraceae family. The species is endemic to South Africa and occurs in the Western Cape from Stellenbosch to Bredasdorp. The species is part of the fynbos. The species grows at altitudes of 50-600 m.
