= Metalasia distans =

Scientific classification
- Kingdom: Plantae
- Clade: Tracheophytes
- Clade: Angiosperms
- Clade: Eudicots
- Clade: Asterids
- Order: Asterales
- Family: Asteraceae
- Genus: Metalasia
- Species: M. distans

Binomial name
- Metalasia distans DC.

Synonyms
- Gnaphalium distans Schrank

Species of flowering plant

Metalasia distans is a shrub that is part of the Asteraceae family. The species is endemic to South Africa and occurs in the Western Cape at Malmesbury. It once occurred from Kraaifontein to Malmesbury but only the one population in the Riverlands Nature Reserve still exists and is threatened by invasive plants. The species is part of the fynbos and occurs at altitudes of 105-108 m.
