= Metalasia acuta =

Scientific classification
- Kingdom: Plantae
- Clade: Tracheophytes
- Clade: Angiosperms
- Clade: Eudicots
- Clade: Asterids
- Order: Asterales
- Family: Asteraceae
- Genus: Metalasia
- Species: M. acuta

Binomial name
- Metalasia acuta P.O.Karis

Species of plant

Metalasia acuta is a shrub that is part of the Asteraceae family. The species is endemic to South Africa and occurs in the Western Cape, from Ceres southwards to Hangklip and eastwards to the Outeniqua Mountains. The species is part of the fynbos and occurs at altitudes of 100-1300 m.
