= Metalasia aurea =

Scientific classification
- Kingdom: Plantae
- Clade: Tracheophytes
- Clade: Angiosperms
- Clade: Eudicots
- Clade: Asterids
- Order: Asterales
- Family: Asteraceae
- Genus: Metalasia
- Species: M. aurea

Binomial name
- Metalasia aurea D.Don

Species of plant

Metalasia aurea is a flowering semi-shrub that is part of the Asteraceae family. The species is endemic to the Eastern Cape and the Western Cape. It occurs mainly in the Kouga Mountains and eastwards to Gqeberha. It also occurs in the Witteberg near Laingsburg and at Cape Infanta.

It grows on mountain slopes 0 - 1000 m and is part of the fynbos.
