= Metalasia tenuis =

Scientific classification
- Kingdom: Plantae
- Clade: Tracheophytes
- Clade: Angiosperms
- Clade: Eudicots
- Clade: Asterids
- Order: Asterales
- Family: Asteraceae
- Genus: Metalasia
- Species: M. tenuis

Binomial name
- Metalasia tenuis P.O.Karis

Species of plant

Metalasia tenuis is a semi-shrub belonging to the Asteraceae family. The species is endemic to South Africa and occurs in the Western Cape in the Riviersonderend Mountains, west of Genadendal to Riviersonderend, as well as in the Swartberg Mountains at Caledon. There are three known populations and the plant has a range of 400 km². The species is part of the fynbos and occurs at altitudes of 100-1000 m. The species is threatened by invasive plants.
