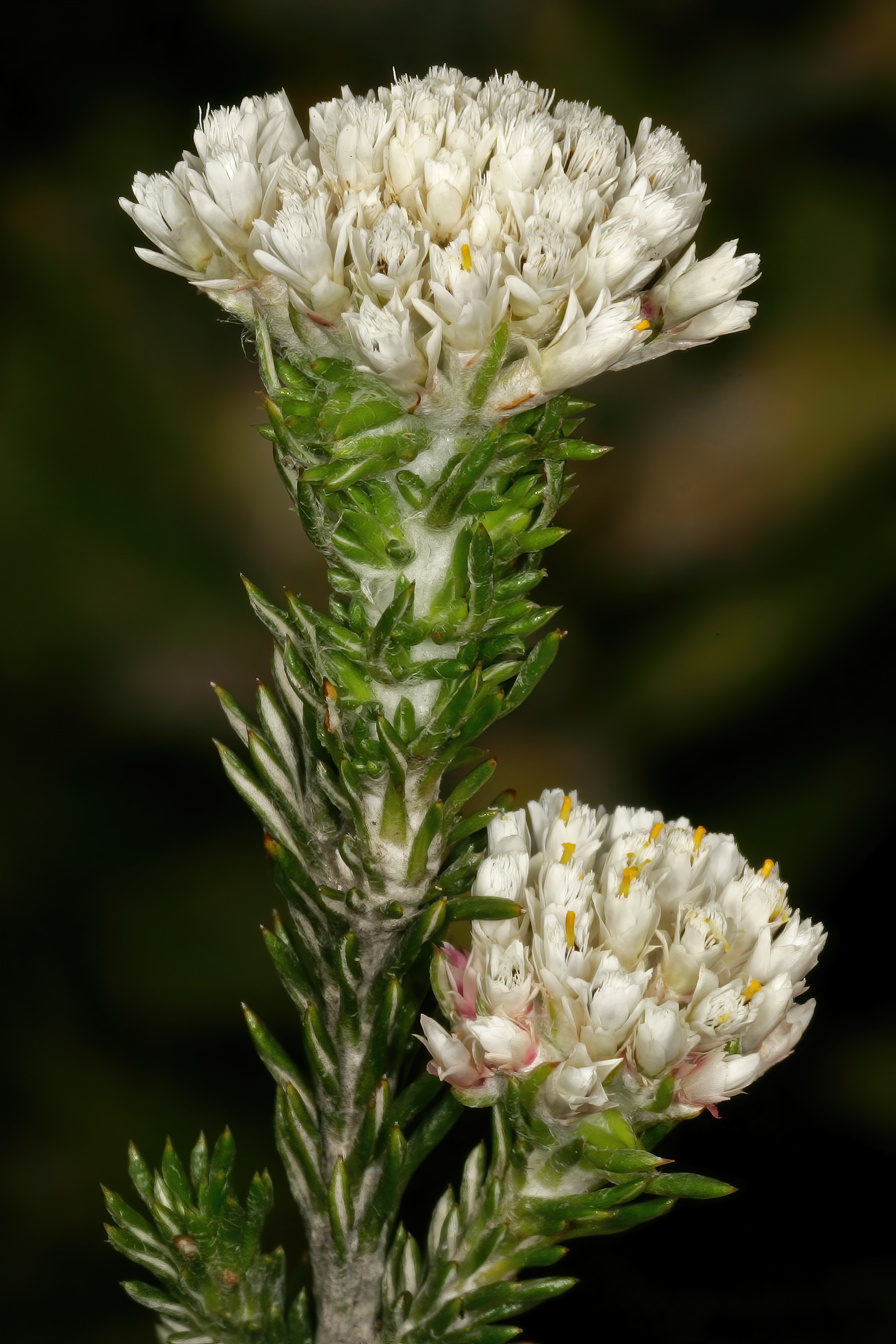

Scientific classification
- Kingdom: Plantae
- Clade: Tracheophytes
- Clade: Angiosperms
- Clade: Eudicots
- Clade: Asterids
- Order: Asterales
- Family: Asteraceae
- Genus: Metalasia
- Species: M. compacta

Binomial name
- Metalasia compacta Zeyh. ex Sch.Bip.

= Metalasia compacta =

Species of plant

Metalasia compacta is a flowering subshrub that is part of the Asteraceae family. The species is endemic to the Western Cape. The plant occurs on the Cape Peninsula from Kommetjie to Cape Point. The plant is extirpated on the Cape Flats. It grows on slopes and plains at altitudes of 0-700 m and is part of the fynbos.
