= Metalasia rogersii =

Scientific classification
- Kingdom: Plantae
- Clade: Tracheophytes
- Clade: Angiosperms
- Clade: Eudicots
- Clade: Asterids
- Order: Asterales
- Family: Asteraceae
- Genus: Metalasia
- Species: M. rogersii

Binomial name
- Metalasia rogersii S.Moore

Species of plant

Metalasia rogersii is a semi-shrub that is part of the Asteraceae family. The species is endemic to South Africa and occurs in the Western Cape from Ceres to the Gydo Pass. The plant is part of the fynbos and grows at altitudes of 1000-1500 m.
