= Metalasia calcicola =

Scientific classification
- Kingdom: Plantae
- Clade: Tracheophytes
- Clade: Angiosperms
- Clade: Eudicots
- Clade: Asterids
- Order: Asterales
- Family: Asteraceae
- Genus: Metalasia
- Species: M. calcicola

Binomial name
- Metalasia calcicola Pillans

Species of plant

Metalasia calcicola is a flowering semi-shrub that is part of the Asteraceae family. The species is endemic to the Western Cape and occurs from the Kogelberg to Kleinmond. It grows from 500 - 1300 m and is part of the fynbos.
