= Metalasia oligocephala =

Scientific classification
- Kingdom: Plantae
- Clade: Tracheophytes
- Clade: Angiosperms
- Clade: Eudicots
- Clade: Asterids
- Order: Asterales
- Family: Asteraceae
- Genus: Metalasia
- Species: M. oligocephala

Binomial name
- Metalasia oligocephala P.O.Karis

Species of plant

Metalasia oligocephala is a semi-shrub that is part of the Asteraceae family. The species is endemic to South Africa and occurs in the Western Cape in the Langeberg near Swellendam between the Protea Valley and Nooitgedacht. There is only one known population of about 1000 plants. The plant is part of the fynbos and is threatened by invasive plants.
