= Metalasia riparia =

Scientific classification
- Kingdom: Plantae
- Clade: Tracheophytes
- Clade: Angiosperms
- Clade: Eudicots
- Clade: Asterids
- Order: Asterales
- Family: Asteraceae
- Genus: Metalasia
- Species: M. riparia

Binomial name
- Metalasia riparia T.M.Salter

Species of plant

Metalasia riparia is a semi-shrub that is part of the Asteraceae family. The species is endemic to South Africa and occurs in the Western Cape from Sir Lowry's Pass, southwards to Betty's Bay and eastwards to Hermanus. The plant is part of the fynbos and occurs at altitudes of 0-300 m. Large parts of the plant's habitat are protected.
