= Metalasia tenuifolia =

Scientific classification
- Kingdom: Plantae
- Clade: Tracheophytes
- Clade: Angiosperms
- Clade: Eudicots
- Clade: Asterids
- Order: Asterales
- Family: Asteraceae
- Genus: Metalasia
- Species: M. tenuifolia

Binomial name
- Metalasia tenuifolia DC.

Species of plant

Metalasia tenuifolia is a flowering subshrub that is part of the Asteraceae family. The species is endemic to the Western Cape and occurs in the Houwhoek, Swartberg, and Riviersonderend Mountains. There are three known populations and it is threatened by invasive species. The species is part of the fynbos.
