= Metalasia lichtensteinii =

Scientific classification
- Kingdom: Plantae
- Clade: Tracheophytes
- Clade: Angiosperms
- Clade: Eudicots
- Clade: Asterids
- Order: Asterales
- Family: Asteraceae
- Genus: Metalasia
- Species: M. lichtensteinii

Binomial name
- Metalasia lichtensteinii Less.

Species of plant

Metalasia lichtensteinii is a semi-shrub belonging to the Asteraceae family. The species is endemic to South Africa and occurs in the Western Cape, from the Hottentots Holland Mountains to Kogelberg and Kleinmond. The plant has a range of 364 km² and is part of the fynbos.
