= Metalasia massonii =

Scientific classification
- Kingdom: Plantae
- Clade: Tracheophytes
- Clade: Angiosperms
- Clade: Eudicots
- Clade: Asterids
- Order: Asterales
- Family: Asteraceae
- Genus: Metalasia
- Species: M. massonii

Binomial name
- Metalasia massonii S.Moore

Synonyms
- Metalasia langebergensis T.M.Salter

Species of plant

Metalasia massonii is a semi-shrub that is part of the Asteraceae family. The species is endemic to South Africa and occurs in the Eastern Cape and the Western Cape, from the Klein Swartberg to Grahamstown. The plant is part of the fynbos and grows at altitudes of 300-1700 m.
