= Metalasia luteola =

Scientific classification
- Kingdom: Plantae
- Clade: Tracheophytes
- Clade: Angiosperms
- Clade: Eudicots
- Clade: Asterids
- Order: Asterales
- Family: Asteraceae
- Genus: Metalasia
- Species: M. luteola

Binomial name
- Metalasia luteola P.O.Karis

Species of plant

Metalasia luteola is a semi-shrub that is part of the Asteraceae family. The species is endemic to South Africa and occurs in the Western Cape on the Riversdale Coastal Plain between the Duiwenhoks and Gourits Rivers. The plant has a range of 367 km² and is part of the fynbos. There are ten known populations. The species is threatened by uncontrolled invasive plants.
