= Metalasia juniperoides =

Scientific classification
- Kingdom: Plantae
- Clade: Tracheophytes
- Clade: Angiosperms
- Clade: Eudicots
- Clade: Asterids
- Order: Asterales
- Family: Asteraceae
- Genus: Metalasia
- Species: M. juniperoides

Binomial name
- Metalasia juniperoides Pillans

Species of flowering plant

Metalasia juniperoides is a shrub belonging to the Asteraceae family. The species is endemic to South Africa and occurs in the Western Cape in the Kouebokkeveld, the upper Olifants River Valley and the Piketberg. The species has a range of 980 km² and three to five populations are known. The plant is threatened by crop cultivation and invasive plants, especially in the eastern part of its range. The species is part of the fynbos.
