= Metalasia alfredii =

Scientific classification
- Kingdom: Plantae
- Clade: Tracheophytes
- Clade: Angiosperms
- Clade: Eudicots
- Clade: Asterids
- Order: Asterales
- Family: Asteraceae
- Genus: Metalasia
- Species: M. alfredii

Binomial name
- Metalasia alfredii Pillans

Species of plant

Metalasia alfredii is a semi-shrub that is part of the Asteraceae family. The species is endemic to South Africa and occurs in the Western Cape at Pilaarkop in the Riviersonderend Mountains and the Baviaanskloof Mountains at Genadendal. The species is part of the fynbos and occurs at altitudes higher than 1500 m. The species is threatened by invasive plants.
