= Metalasia strictifolia =

Scientific classification
- Kingdom: Plantae
- Clade: Tracheophytes
- Clade: Angiosperms
- Clade: Eudicots
- Clade: Asterids
- Order: Asterales
- Family: Asteraceae
- Genus: Metalasia
- Species: M. strictifolia

Binomial name
- Metalasia strictifolia Bolus

Species of plant

Metalasia strictifolia is a semi-shrub that is part of the Asteraceae family. The species is endemic to South Africa and occurs in the Western Cape from the Swartberg to the Kouga Mountains. The plant is part of the fynbos and occurs at altitudes of 1500-2100 m. The species has no threats.
