= Metalasia tristis =

Scientific classification
- Kingdom: Plantae
- Clade: Tracheophytes
- Clade: Angiosperms
- Clade: Eudicots
- Clade: Asterids
- Order: Asterales
- Family: Asteraceae
- Genus: Metalasia
- Species: M. tristis

Binomial name
- Metalasia tristis Bengtson & P.O.Karis

Species of plant

Metalasia tristis is a shrub that is part of the Asteraceae family. The species is endemic to South Africa and occurs in the Western Cape in the Groot Winterhoek near Porterville. The species has a range of less than 40 km^{2} and is part of the fynbos. The species is considered rare.
