= Metalasia bodkinii =

Scientific classification
- Kingdom: Plantae
- Clade: Tracheophytes
- Clade: Angiosperms
- Clade: Eudicots
- Clade: Asterids
- Order: Asterales
- Family: Asteraceae
- Genus: Metalasia
- Species: M. bodkinii

Binomial name
- Metalasia bodkinii L.Bolus

Species of plant

Metalasia bodkinii is a shrub that is part of the Asteraceae family. The species is endemic to South Africa and occurs in the Western Cape in the Swartberg Mountains near Caledon. The plant is part of the fynbos and occurs at altitudes of 700-900 m. The species was first discovered in 1894 at two locations and only rediscovered in 2007. The plant is threatened by invasive plants such as pine and hakea species.
