= Metalasia phillipsii =

Scientific classification
- Kingdom: Plantae
- Clade: Tracheophytes
- Clade: Angiosperms
- Clade: Eudicots
- Clade: Asterids
- Order: Asterales
- Family: Asteraceae
- Genus: Metalasia
- Species: M. phillipsii

Binomial name
- Metalasia phillipsii L.Bolus

Species of plant

Metalasia phillipsii is a semi-shrub belonging to the Asteraceae family. The species is endemic to South Africa and occurs in the Western Cape in the eastern Hex River Mountains and on the Matroosberg. It has a range of 495 km² and four populations are known. The plant is part of the fynbos and occurs at altitudes of 1500-2200 m. The species is considered rare.

The species has two subspecies:

- Metalasia phillipsii subsp. incurva (Pillans) P.O.Karis
- Metalasia phillipsii subsp. phillipsii
