= Metalasia muraltiifolia =

Scientific classification
- Kingdom: Plantae
- Clade: Tracheophytes
- Clade: Angiosperms
- Clade: Eudicots
- Clade: Asterids
- Order: Asterales
- Family: Asteraceae
- Genus: Metalasia
- Species: M. muraltiifolia

Binomial name
- Metalasia muraltiifolia DC.

Synonyms
- Metalasia barnardii L.Bolus

Species of plant

Metalasia muraltiifolia is a flowering subshrub in the Asteraceae family. The species is endemic to the Western Cape and occurs in the Wemmershoekberge, Slanghoekberge and southern Hex River Mountains. It grows from 600 - 1850 m and is part of the fynbos.
