= Metalasia galpinii =

Scientific classification
- Kingdom: Plantae
- Clade: Tracheophytes
- Clade: Angiosperms
- Clade: Eudicots
- Clade: Asterids
- Order: Asterales
- Family: Asteraceae
- Genus: Metalasia
- Species: M. galpinii

Binomial name
- Metalasia galpinii L.Bolus

Species of flowering plant

Metalasia galpinii is a semi-shrub that is part of the Asteraceae family. The species is endemic to South Africa and occurs in the Western Cape in the Langeberg near the Garcia Pass. It has a range of 150 km² and five populations are known. The plant is part of the fynbos and occurs at altitudes of 350-750 m. The plant is threatened by invasive plants and illegal collection.
