= Metalasia eburnea =

Scientific classification
- Kingdom: Plantae
- Clade: Tracheophytes
- Clade: Angiosperms
- Clade: Eudicots
- Clade: Asterids
- Order: Asterales
- Family: Asteraceae
- Genus: Metalasia
- Species: M. eburnea

Binomial name
- Metalasia eburnea Bengtson & P.O.Karis

Species of plant

Metalasia eburnea is a semi-shrub that is part of the Asteraceae family. The species is endemic to South Africa and occurs in the Western Cape in the Klein Karoo north of the Langeberg. There are only two known populations and the species is part of the fynbos. It is threatened by crop cultivation.
