= Metalasia adunca =

Scientific classification
- Kingdom: Plantae
- Clade: Tracheophytes
- Clade: Angiosperms
- Clade: Eudicots
- Clade: Asterids
- Order: Asterales
- Family: Asteraceae
- Genus: Metalasia
- Species: M. adunca

Binomial name
- Metalasia adunca Less.

Species of flowering plant

Metalasia adunca is a shrub belonging to the Asteraceae family. The species is endemic to South Africa and occurs in the Northern Cape and Western Cape, from Hondeklip Bay to the Cape Flats. The species has a range of 17 500 km² and of the eighteen known populations, five have already been lost to suburban development and crop cultivation. The species is part of the fynbos.
