= Metalasia octoflora =

Scientific classification
- Kingdom: Plantae
- Clade: Tracheophytes
- Clade: Angiosperms
- Clade: Eudicots
- Clade: Asterids
- Order: Asterales
- Family: Asteraceae
- Genus: Metalasia
- Species: M. octoflora

Binomial name
- Metalasia octoflora DC.

Synonyms
- Metalasia xanthocephala T.M.Salter

Species of flowering plant

Metalasia octoflora, the Swartland blombos, is a flowering shrub belonging to the Asteraceae family. The species is endemic to South Africa and occurs in the Western Cape, from Malmesbury to Durbanville, Paarl and Wolseley. The plant has a range of 1 583-1 828 km² and is part of the fynbos. There were eight to ten populations that are now severely fragmented. Suburban development and crop cultivation have already taken over 90% of the species' habitat. The remaining plants are threatened by invasive plants, overgrazing and poor fire management.
