= Metalasia trivialis =

Scientific classification
- Kingdom: Plantae
- Clade: Tracheophytes
- Clade: Angiosperms
- Clade: Eudicots
- Clade: Asterids
- Order: Asterales
- Family: Asteraceae
- Genus: Metalasia
- Species: M. trivialis

Binomial name
- Metalasia trivialis P.O.Karis

Species of plant

Metalasia trivialis is a flowering subshrub in the Asteraceae family. The species is endemic to the Eastern Cape and the Western Cape. It occurs mainly between Ladismith and Grahamstown and there are also populations at Cathcart and Stutterheim.

It grows on mountain slopes and plains, rocky, clayey and sandy soils from 0 - 1500 m and is part of the fynbos.
