= Metalasia umbelliformis =

Scientific classification
- Kingdom: Plantae
- Clade: Tracheophytes
- Clade: Angiosperms
- Clade: Eudicots
- Clade: Asterids
- Order: Asterales
- Family: Asteraceae
- Genus: Metalasia
- Species: M. umbelliformis

Binomial name
- Metalasia umbelliformis D.Don

Species of flowering plant

Metalasia umbelliformis is a flowering subshrub that is part of the Asteraceae family. The species is endemic to the Western Cape and occurs from Pearly Beach to Brandfontein. Four populations are known: Brandfontein, Rietfontein, Hagelkraal and Pearly Beach. The plant has a range of 150 km^{2} and is part of the fynbos. The species is threatened by coastal development and invasive plants.
