= Metalasia humilis =

Scientific classification
- Kingdom: Plantae
- Clade: Tracheophytes
- Clade: Angiosperms
- Clade: Eudicots
- Clade: Asterids
- Order: Asterales
- Family: Asteraceae
- Genus: Metalasia
- Species: M. humilis

Binomial name
- Metalasia humilis P.O.Karis

Species of plant

Metalasia humilis is a semi-shrub that is part of the Asteraceae family. The species is endemic to South Africa and occurs in the Western Cape on the Houwhoek Mountain. Only one population is known on the peak of the mountain. The species is part of the fynbos and is considered critically rare.
