= Metalasia pungens =

Scientific classification
- Kingdom: Plantae
- Clade: Tracheophytes
- Clade: Angiosperms
- Clade: Eudicots
- Clade: Asterids
- Order: Asterales
- Family: Asteraceae
- Genus: Metalasia
- Species: M. pungens

Binomial name
- Metalasia pungens D.Don

Species of plant

Metalasia pungens is a semi-shrub that is part of the Asteraceae family. The species is endemic to South Africa and occurs in the Eastern Cape and the Western Cape from Bredasdorp to Grahamstown. The species is part of the fynbos and grows at altitudes of 0-1800 m.
