= Metalasia pulcherrima =

Scientific classification
- Kingdom: Plantae
- Clade: Tracheophytes
- Clade: Angiosperms
- Clade: Eudicots
- Clade: Asterids
- Order: Asterales
- Family: Asteraceae
- Genus: Metalasia
- Species: M. pulcherrima

Binomial name
- Metalasia pulcherrima Less.

Species of plant

Metalasia pulcherrima is a flowering subshrub that is part of the Asteraceae family. The species is endemic to the Eastern Cape and the Western Cape and occurs from the Witteberg to the Langkloof. The species is part of the fynbos.

The species has two infraspecies:

- Metalasia pulcherrima f. pallescens (Harv.) P.O.Karis
- Metalasia pulcherrima f. pulcherrima
