= Metalasia rhoderoides =

Scientific classification
- Kingdom: Plantae
- Clade: Tracheophytes
- Clade: Angiosperms
- Clade: Eudicots
- Clade: Asterids
- Order: Asterales
- Family: Asteraceae
- Genus: Metalasia
- Species: M. rhoderoides

Binomial name
- Metalasia rhoderoides T.M.Salter

Species of plant

Metalasia rhoderoides is a semi-shrub that is part of the Asteraceae family. The species is endemic to South Africa and occurs in the Western Cape in the Limietberge and Slanghoekberge. There are five known populations and the species is threatened by invasive plants. The plant has an area of occurrence of 80 km² and is part of the fynbos.
