= Metalasia albescens =

Scientific classification
- Kingdom: Plantae
- Clade: Tracheophytes
- Clade: Angiosperms
- Clade: Eudicots
- Clade: Asterids
- Order: Asterales
- Family: Asteraceae
- Genus: Metalasia
- Species: M. albescens

Binomial name
- Metalasia albescens P.O.Karis

Species of flowering plant

Metalasia albescens is a semi-shrub that is part of the Asteraceae family. The species is endemic to South Africa and occurs in the Western Cape in the southern Cederberg. The plant has a range of less than 90 km² and there are five populations known between the Kromrivier peak and the Matjiesrivier area. The species is part of the fynbos and occurs at altitudes of 700 m. The species is considered rare.
