= Metalasia namaquana =

Scientific classification
- Kingdom: Plantae
- Clade: Tracheophytes
- Clade: Angiosperms
- Clade: Eudicots
- Clade: Asterids
- Order: Asterales
- Family: Asteraceae
- Genus: Metalasia
- Species: M. namaquana

Binomial name
- Metalasia namaquana P.O.Karis & Helme

Species of plant

Metalasia namaquana is a semi-shrub that is part of the Asteraceae family. The species is endemic to South Africa and occurs in the Northern Cape on the Rooiberg and Stalberg in the Kamiesberge. The plant has a range of less than 10 km² and is part of the fynbos. It occurs at altitudes of 1200-1500 m.
