= Metalasia seriphiifolia =

Scientific classification
- Kingdom: Plantae
- Clade: Tracheophytes
- Clade: Angiosperms
- Clade: Eudicots
- Clade: Asterids
- Order: Asterales
- Family: Asteraceae
- Genus: Metalasia
- Species: M. seriphiifolia

Binomial name
- Metalasia seriphiifolia DC.

Synonyms
- Metalasia cephalotes DC.

Species of plant

Metalasia seriphiifolia is a flowering subshrub that is part of the Asteraceae family. The species is endemic to the Western Cape and occurs in the Kleinrivier Mountains. It grows from 50 - 100 m and is part of the fynbos. There are three known populations and they are threatened by invasive plants and urban development.
