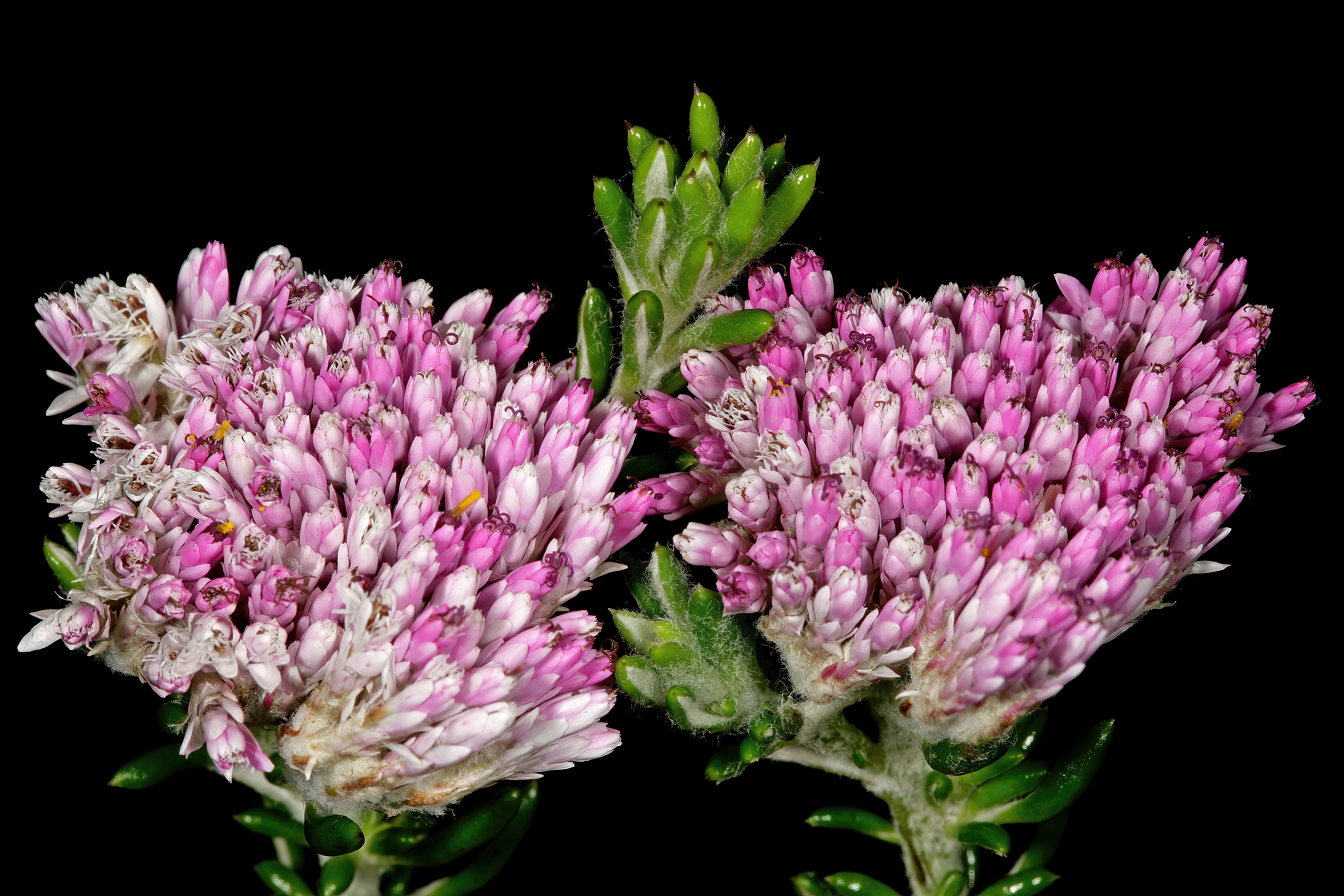

Scientific classification
- Kingdom: Plantae
- Clade: Tracheophytes
- Clade: Angiosperms
- Clade: Eudicots
- Clade: Asterids
- Order: Asterales
- Family: Asteraceae
- Genus: Metalasia
- Species: M. erubescens

Binomial name
- Metalasia erubescens DC.

Synonyms
- Metalasia nitidula Harv.

= Metalasia erubescens =

Species of plant

Metalasia erubescens is a flowering subshrub that is part of the Asteraceae family. The species is endemic to the Western Cape. The plant occurs from Elgin to Caledon, the Swartberg Mountains and Cape Agulhas. It grows from sea level to slopes of 1000 m and is part of the fynbos.
