= Metalasia dregeana =

Scientific classification
- Kingdom: Plantae
- Clade: Tracheophytes
- Clade: Angiosperms
- Clade: Eudicots
- Clade: Asterids
- Order: Asterales
- Family: Asteraceae
- Genus: Metalasia
- Species: M. dregeana

Binomial name
- Metalasia dregeana DC.

Species of plant

Metalasia dregeana is a flowering subshrub that is part of the Asteraceae family. The species is endemic to the Western Cape and occurs from the Cederberg and Piketberg southwards to Stellenbosch and Worcester. It grows from 200 - 1000 m and is part of the fynbos.
