= Metalasia helmei =

Scientific classification
- Kingdom: Plantae
- Clade: Tracheophytes
- Clade: Angiosperms
- Clade: Eudicots
- Clade: Asterids
- Order: Asterales
- Family: Asteraceae
- Genus: Metalasia
- Species: M. helmei

Binomial name
- Metalasia helmei P.O.Karis

Species of plant

Metalasia helmei is a semi-shrub that is part of the Asteraceae family. The species is endemic to South Africa and occurs in the Robertson area on the Kwadousberg. It has a range of only 12 km² and only one population is known, which is smaller than 10 000 plants. The species is part of the fynbos and is considered rare.
