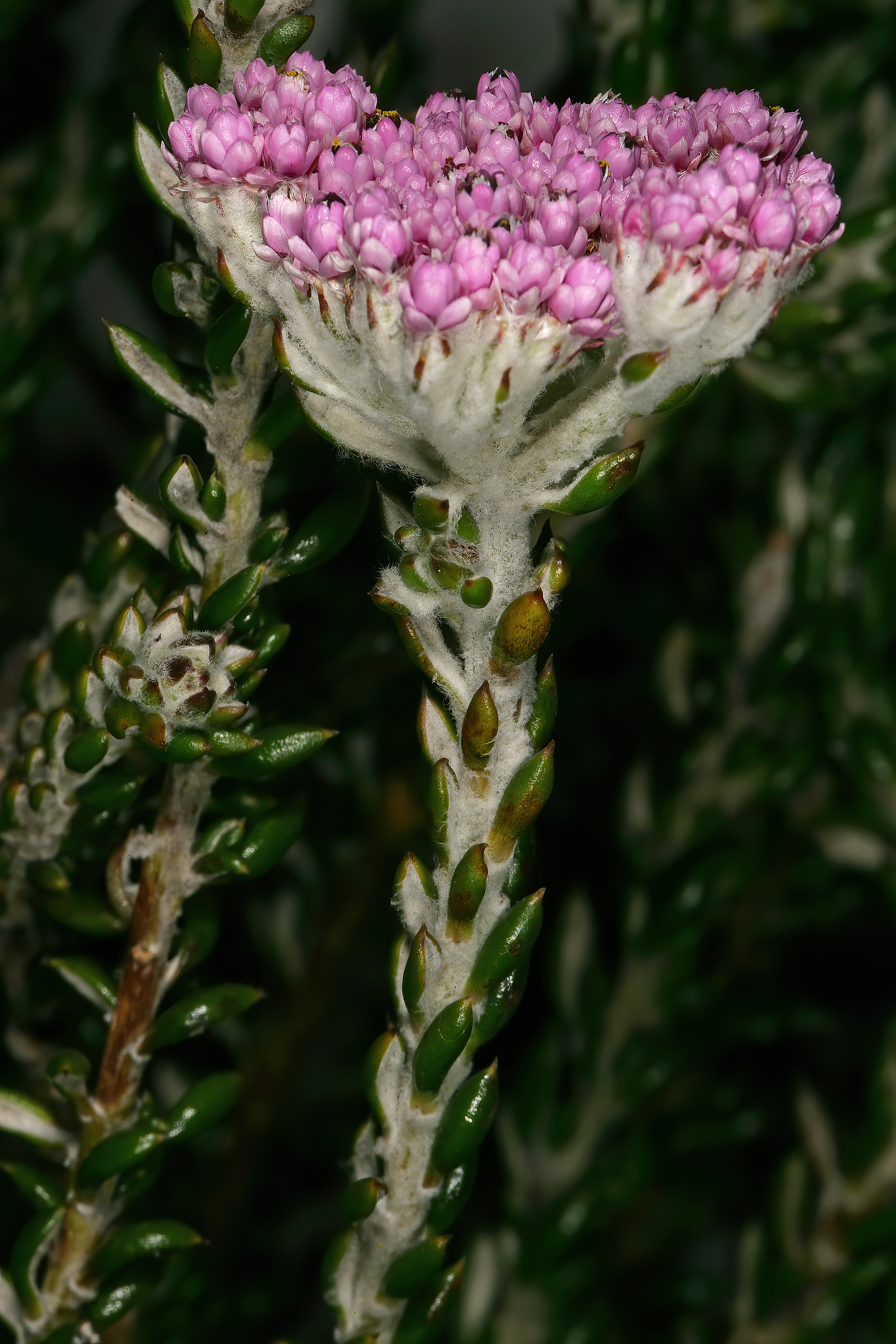

Scientific classification
- Kingdom: Plantae
- Clade: Tracheophytes
- Clade: Angiosperms
- Clade: Eudicots
- Clade: Asterids
- Order: Asterales
- Family: Asteraceae
- Genus: Metalasia
- Species: M. serrata

Binomial name
- Metalasia serrata P.O.Karis

= Metalasia serrata =

Species of plant

Metalasia serrata is a flowering subshrub that is part of the Asteraceae family. The species is endemic to the Western Cape and occurs from Stanford to Bredasdorp.

It grows on mountain slopes at 700 - 1100 m and is part of the fynbos.
