= Metalasia formosa =

Scientific classification
- Kingdom: Plantae
- Clade: Tracheophytes
- Clade: Angiosperms
- Clade: Eudicots
- Clade: Asterids
- Order: Asterales
- Family: Asteraceae
- Genus: Metalasia
- Species: M. formosa

Binomial name
- Metalasia formosa Bengtson & P.O.Karis

Species of plant

Metalasia formosa is a shrub that is part of the Asteraceae family. The species is endemic to South Africa and occurs in the Western Cape in the hills north of Touws River and in the Langeberg east of Montagu. The species has a range of 1,600 km^{2} (620 sq mi) and is part of the fynbos.
