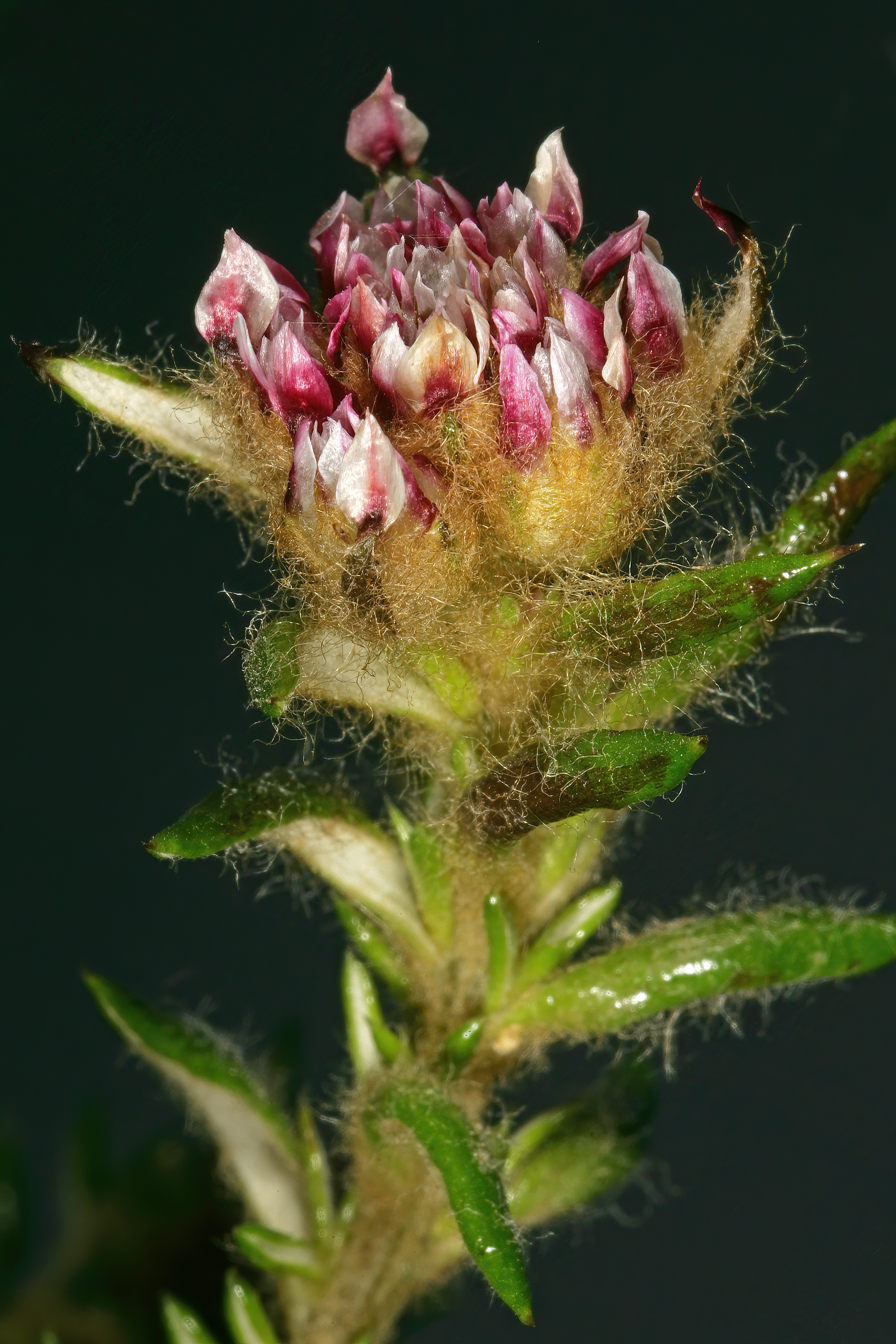

Scientific classification
- Kingdom: Plantae
- Clade: Tracheophytes
- Clade: Angiosperms
- Clade: Eudicots
- Clade: Asterids
- Order: Asterales
- Family: Asteraceae
- Genus: Metalasia
- Species: M. cephalotes

Binomial name
- Metalasia cephalotes (Thunb.) Less.

Synonyms
- Endoleuca sphaerocephala Cass.; Gnaphalium capitatum Thunb.; Gnaphalium carneum Lam.; Gnaphalium cephalotes Thunb.; Helichrysum cephalotes (Thunb.) D.Don ex G.Don; Metalasia glomerata DC.; Metalasia rosea DC.

= Metalasia cephalotes =

Species of plant

Metalasia cephalotes is a flowering subshrub that is part of the Asteraceae family. The species is endemic to the Western Cape. The plant occurs in the mountains around Paarl, Franschhoek and Stellenbosch including the Hottentots Holland Mountains. It grows on mountain slopes at altitudes of 300 - 1200 m and is part of the fynbos.
