= Metalasia pallida =

Scientific classification
- Kingdom: Plantae
- Clade: Tracheophytes
- Clade: Angiosperms
- Clade: Eudicots
- Clade: Asterids
- Order: Asterales
- Family: Asteraceae
- Genus: Metalasia
- Species: M. pallida

Binomial name
- Metalasia pallida Bolus

Species of plant

Metalasia pallida is a semi-shrub that is part of the Asteraceae family. The species is endemic to South Africa and occurs in the Western Cape from Ladismith to Graaff-Reinet and Cape St Francis. The plant is part of the fynbos and occurs at altitudes of 0-1900 m. The species has no threats.
