= Conchaspis =

Scientific classification
- Domain: Eukaryota
- Kingdom: Animalia
- Phylum: Arthropoda
- Class: Insecta
- Order: Hemiptera
- Suborder: Sternorrhyncha
- Family: Conchaspididae
- Genus: Conchaspis; Cockerell, 1893

Genus of insects

Conchaspis is a genus of true bugs belonging to the family Conchaspididae.

The species of this genus are found in Central America and Southern Africa.

Species:

- Conchaspis acaciae Hodgson, 1967
- Conchaspis angraeci Cockerell, 1893
- Conchaspis buchananiae Takagi, 1992
- Conchaspis capensis (Linnaeus, 1763)
- Conchaspis cordiae Mamet, 1954
- Conchaspis didiereae Mamet, 1956
- Conchaspis diplothemii Lepage & Giannotti, 1943
- Conchaspis ekebergiae Munting, 1964
- Conchaspis euphorbiae Brain, 1918
- Conchaspis fluminensis Hempel, 1904
- Conchaspis garciniae Takagi, 1992
- Conchaspis hainanensis Hu, 1986
- Conchaspis insolitus Mamet, 1954
- Conchaspis lata Hempel, 1937
- Conchaspis lepagei Hempel, 1937
- Conchaspis madagascariensis Mamet, 1954
- Conchaspis mameti Ben-Dov, 1974
- Conchaspis newsteadi Cockerell, 1897
- Conchaspis orchidarum Mamet, 1954
- Conchaspis pauliani Mamet, 1951
- Conchaspis socialis Green, 1896
- Conchaspis tsaratananae Mamet, 1951
- Conchaspis tsinjoarivensis Mamet, 1954
- Conchaspis vaccinii Khoo, 1978
- Conchaspis vaughani Mamet, 1954
- Conchaspis vayssierei Mamet, 1954
