= Metalasia erectifolia =

Scientific classification
- Kingdom: Plantae
- Clade: Tracheophytes
- Clade: Angiosperms
- Clade: Eudicots
- Clade: Asterids
- Order: Asterales
- Family: Asteraceae
- Genus: Metalasia
- Species: M. erectifolia

Binomial name
- Metalasia erectifolia Pillans

Species of flowering plant

Metalasia erectifolia is a shrub that is part of the Asteraceae family. The species is endemic to South Africa and occurs in the Western Cape from Cape Agulhas to Mossel Bay. The species has a range of 4 168 km² and thirteen populations are known. The species is part of the fynbos and has already lost some of its habitat to coastal development and invasive plants.
