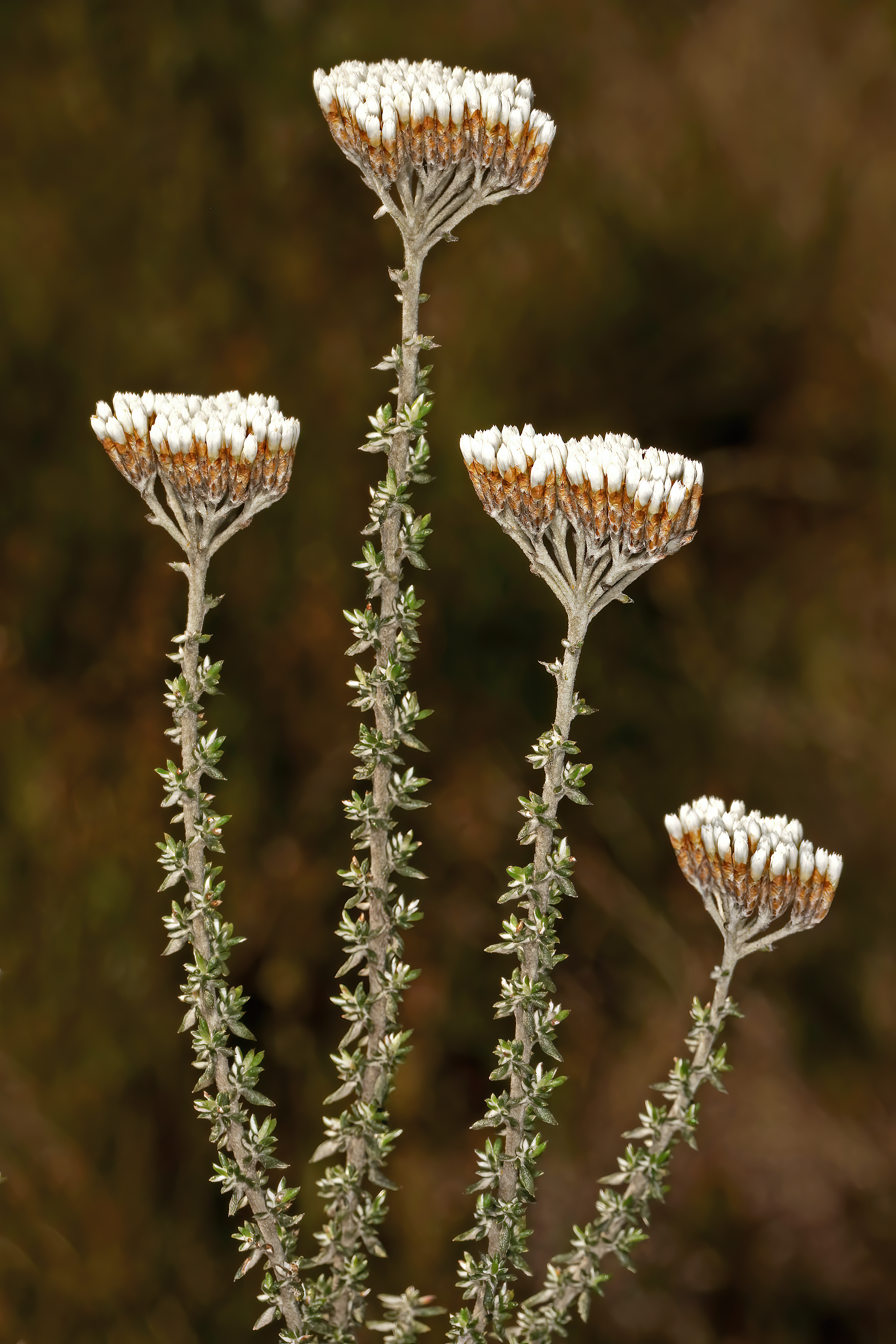
- Inflorescences
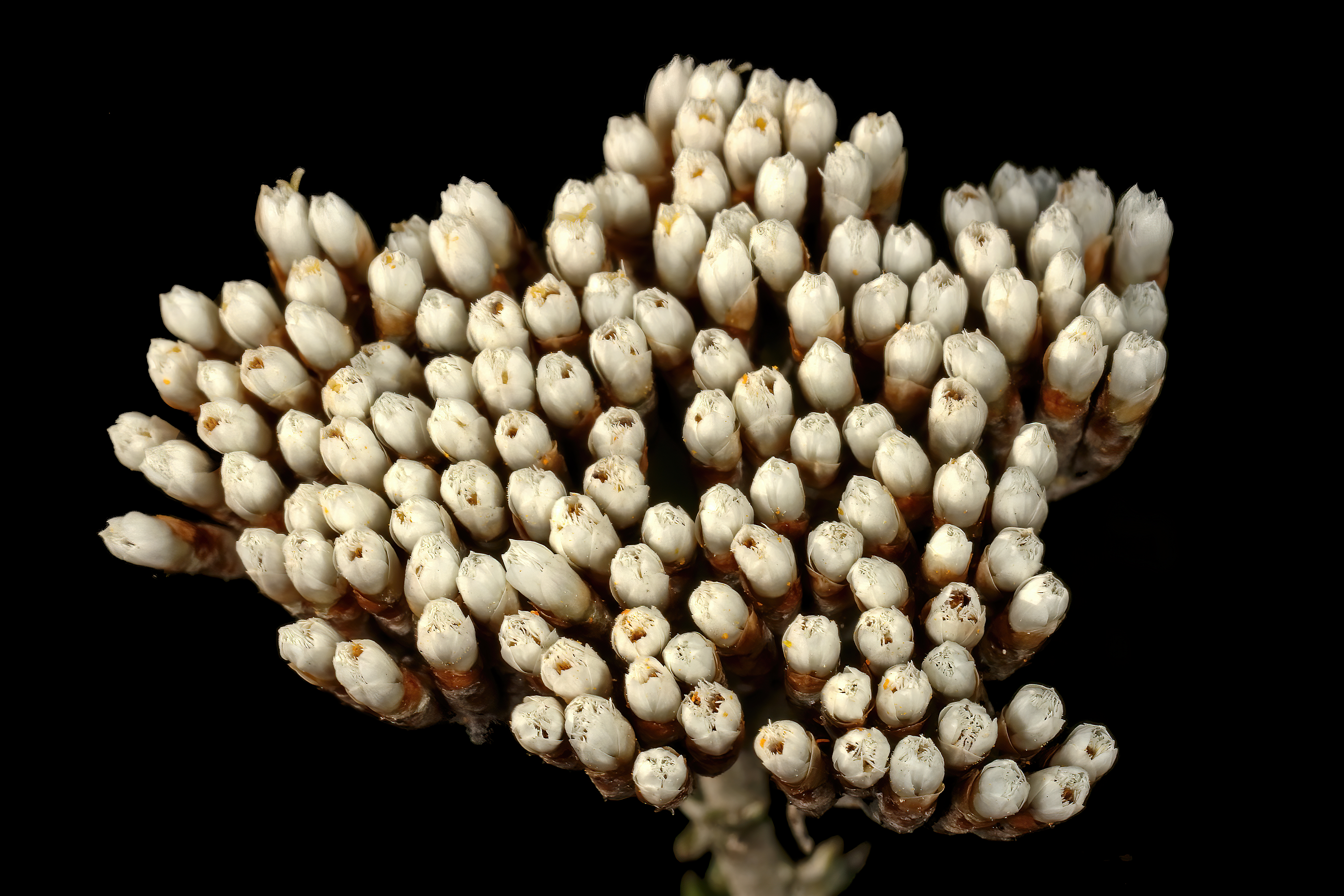
- Top view of flowers

Scientific classification
- Kingdom: Plantae
- Clade: Embryophytes
- Clade: Tracheophytes
- Clade: Spermatophytes
- Clade: Angiosperms
- Clade: Eudicots
- Clade: Asterids
- Order: Asterales
- Family: Asteraceae
- Genus: Metalasia
- Species: M. densa

Binomial name
- Metalasia densa (Lam.) P.O.Karis

Synonyms
- Gnaphalium densum Lam.; Metalasia polyanthos D.Don; Metalasia stricta Less.

= Metalasia densa =

Species of plant

Metalasia densa, the bristle bush or blombos, is a species of flowering plant in the family Asteraceae, native to South Africa and Lesotho. A perennial shrub reaching 2.5 m (8 ft), it is fire-adapted.
