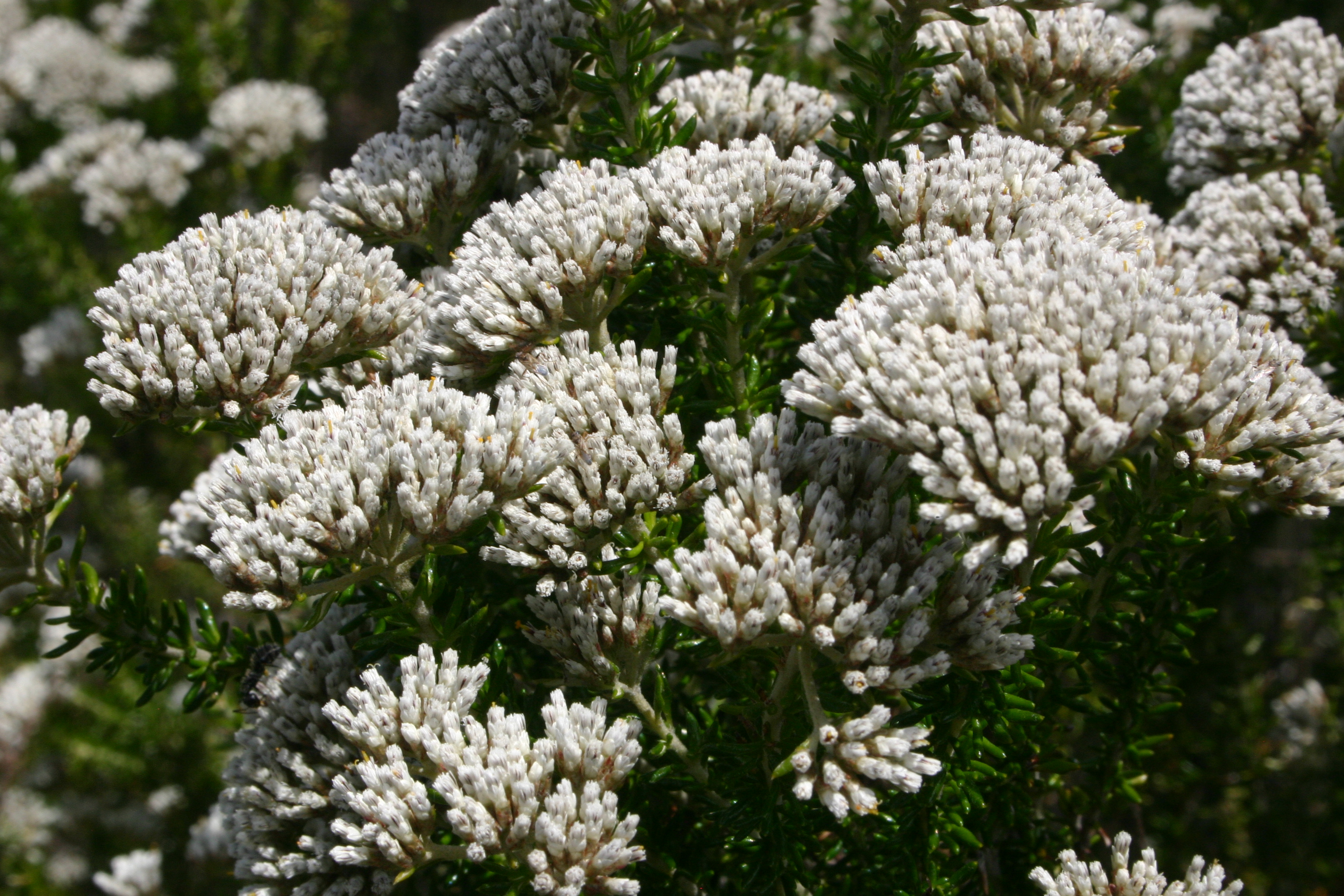

Scientific classification
- Kingdom: Plantae
- Clade: Tracheophytes
- Clade: Angiosperms
- Clade: Eudicots
- Clade: Asterids
- Order: Asterales
- Family: Asteraceae
- Genus: Metalasia
- Species: M. muricata

Binomial name
- Metalasia muricata (L.) R.Br. (1817)

Synonyms
- Gnaphalium fasciculatum Lam. (1788); Gnaphalium muricatum L. (1753); Gnaphalium polyanthos Thunb. (1800); Gnaphalium umbellatum Schrank (1821-1822 publ. 1824), nom. illeg.; Helichrysum saturejifolium Moench (1802); Metalasia cristata DC. (1838); Metalasia cymosa Cass. (1824); Metalasia ericoides Sieber ex DC.(1838); Metalasia phylicoides D.Don (1826)

= Metalasia muricata =

Species of shrub

Metalasia muricata, commonly known as white bristle bush or blombos, is a hardy virgate or twiggy shrub with honey-scented flowers usually 2–4 m tall, woody with a rounded crown. It is native to the Cape Provinces of South Africa, where it is an important component of the coastal and mountain fynbos regions. It is encountered in a number of forms in its extended distribution, some of which are tolerant of frost, wind and poor sandy soils.

A member of the Asteraceae or daisy family, Metalasia has some 54 species in South Africa, many of them found in the Western Cape. The name of the genus Metalasia is derived from 'meta' which can have many meanings, but in this case is intended as 'reverse', and 'lasios' meaning 'woolly', an allusion to the woolly reverse sides of the leaves; 'muricata' means warty with short, sharp points like the shell of the Murex. Metalasia is also found in KwaZulu-Natal, Free State, Eastern Cape and Lesotho.

The leaves of Metalasia muricata are some 6 mm long, in tufts or fascicled, closely packed about the stem, acicular or needle-like, sharp-tipped, greenish-grey and may be either glabrous or woolly. Flowers range from white to pink or purple, are bisexual, and produce fruits or cypselae which in this genus are ribbed nutlets with bristly pappi. The greyish bark is slightly striated. This is one of the first plant species to reappear after a fire, and offers shelter to less resilient plants when they emerge after being burnt. It is occasionally used with Marram grass and Chrysanthemoides monilifera to stabilise coastal dunes.

== Gallery ==
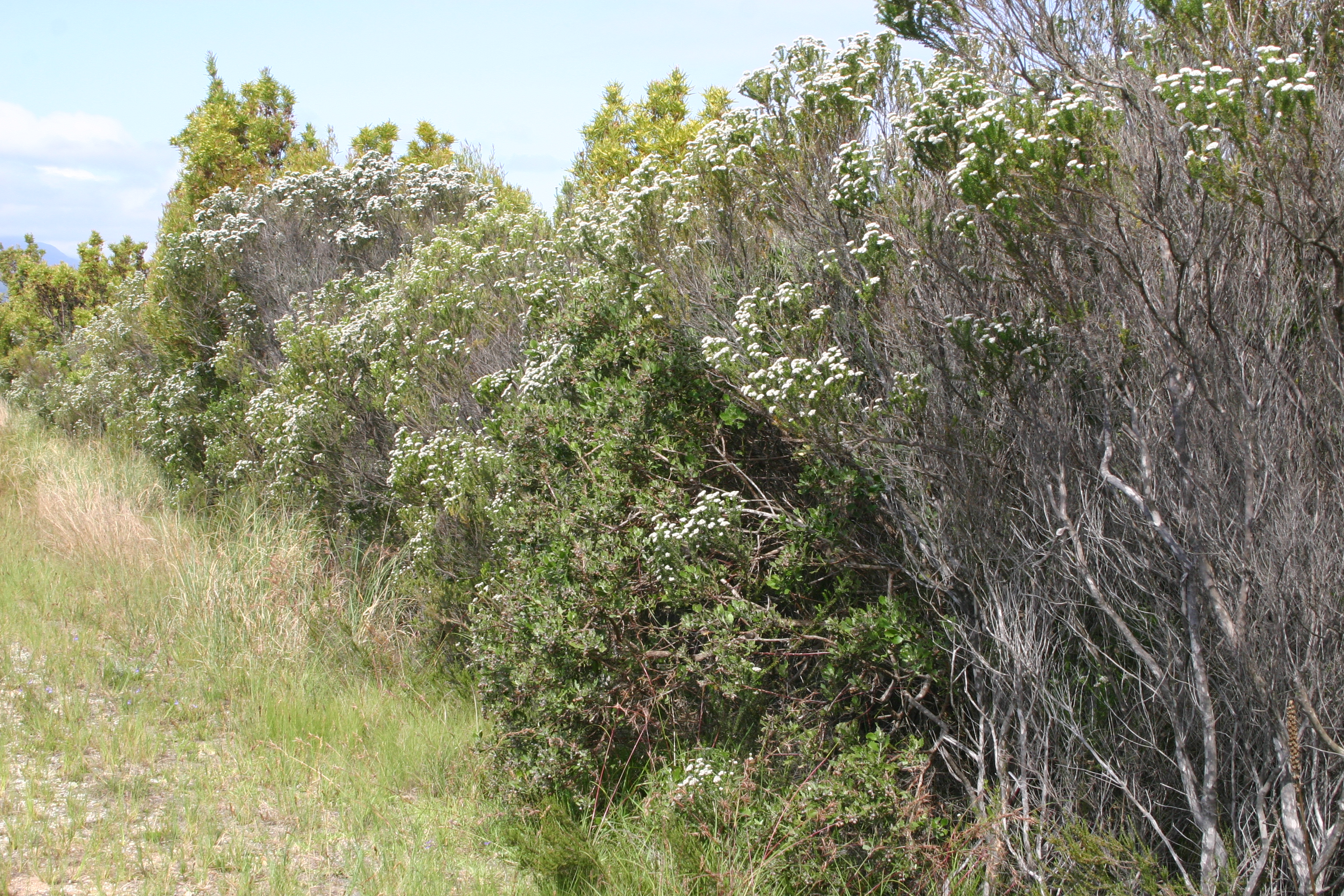

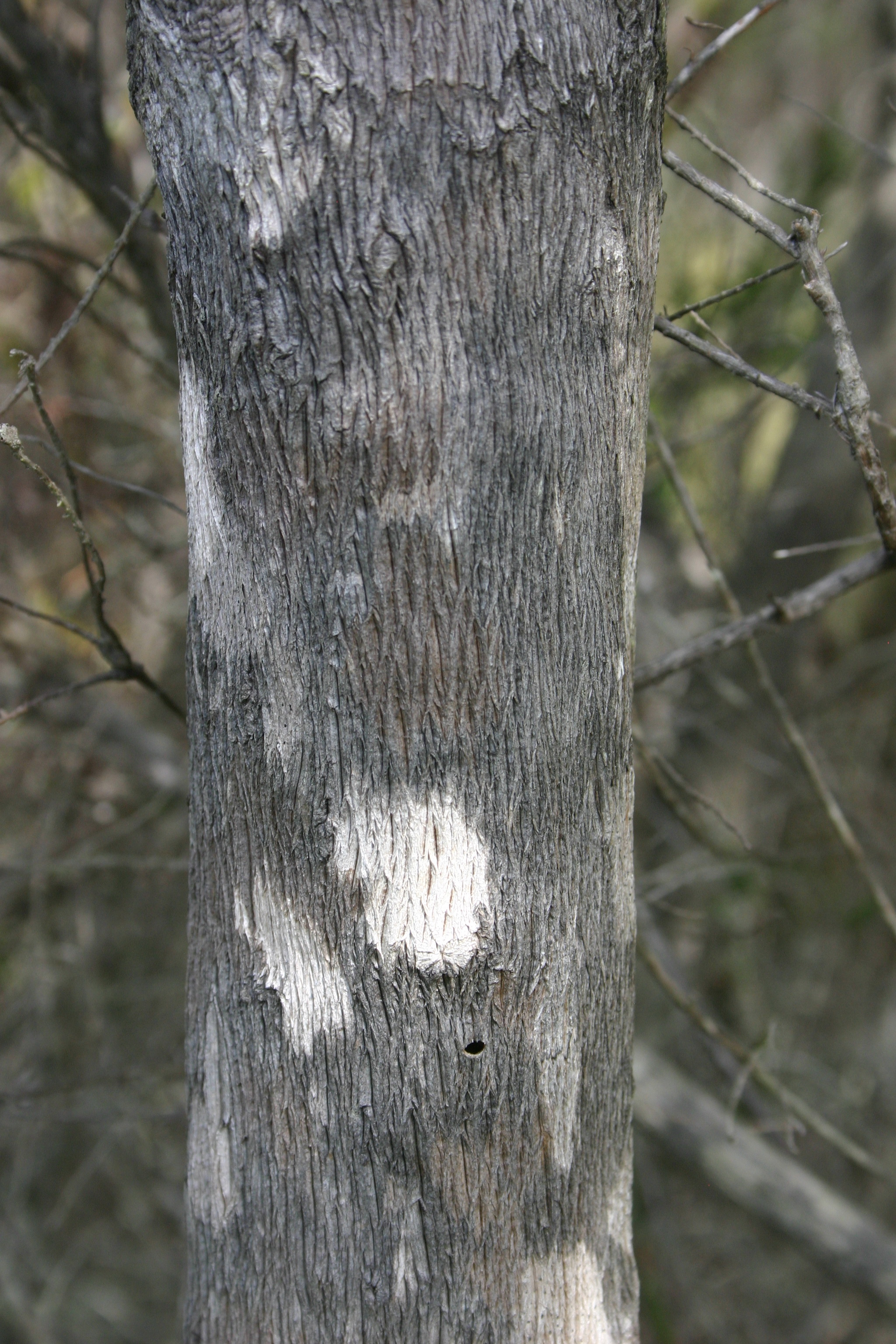
