= Bertilia (plant) =

Scientific classification
- Kingdom: Plantae
- Clade: Tracheophytes
- Clade: Angiosperms
- Clade: Eudicots
- Clade: Asterids
- Order: Asterales
- Family: Asteraceae
- Genus: Bertilia; Cron

Genus of flowering plants

Bertilia is a genus of flowering plants belonging to the family Asteraceae.

Its native range is South African Republic.

Species:

- Bertilia hantamensis (J.C.Manning & Goldblatt) Cron
