= Goldenrod (disambiguation) =

Goldenrod, various yellow flowering plants in the family Asteraceae. Usually the genus Solidago, but species in Chrysoma, Euthamia and Oreochrysum are also called goldenrods.

Goldenrod may also refer to:

- Goldenrod (color), a color defined by the W3C for use in Scalable Vector Graphics as RGB (218, 165, 32)
- Goldenrod Records, a record label
- Goldenrod (car), the name of the 1965 land speed record car
- Goldenrod (showboat), a showboat which operated on the Mississippi River
- Goldenrod, Florida, a community in the United States
- Goldenrod City, a town in the second generation of the Pokémon franchise.
- "Goldenrod", a song from the band Blondie's album, The Curse of Blondie
- Goldenrod (film), a Canadian western film
- SS Golden Rod, an American cargo ship in service 1928-35
- Golden Rod Stakes, an annual American horse race
