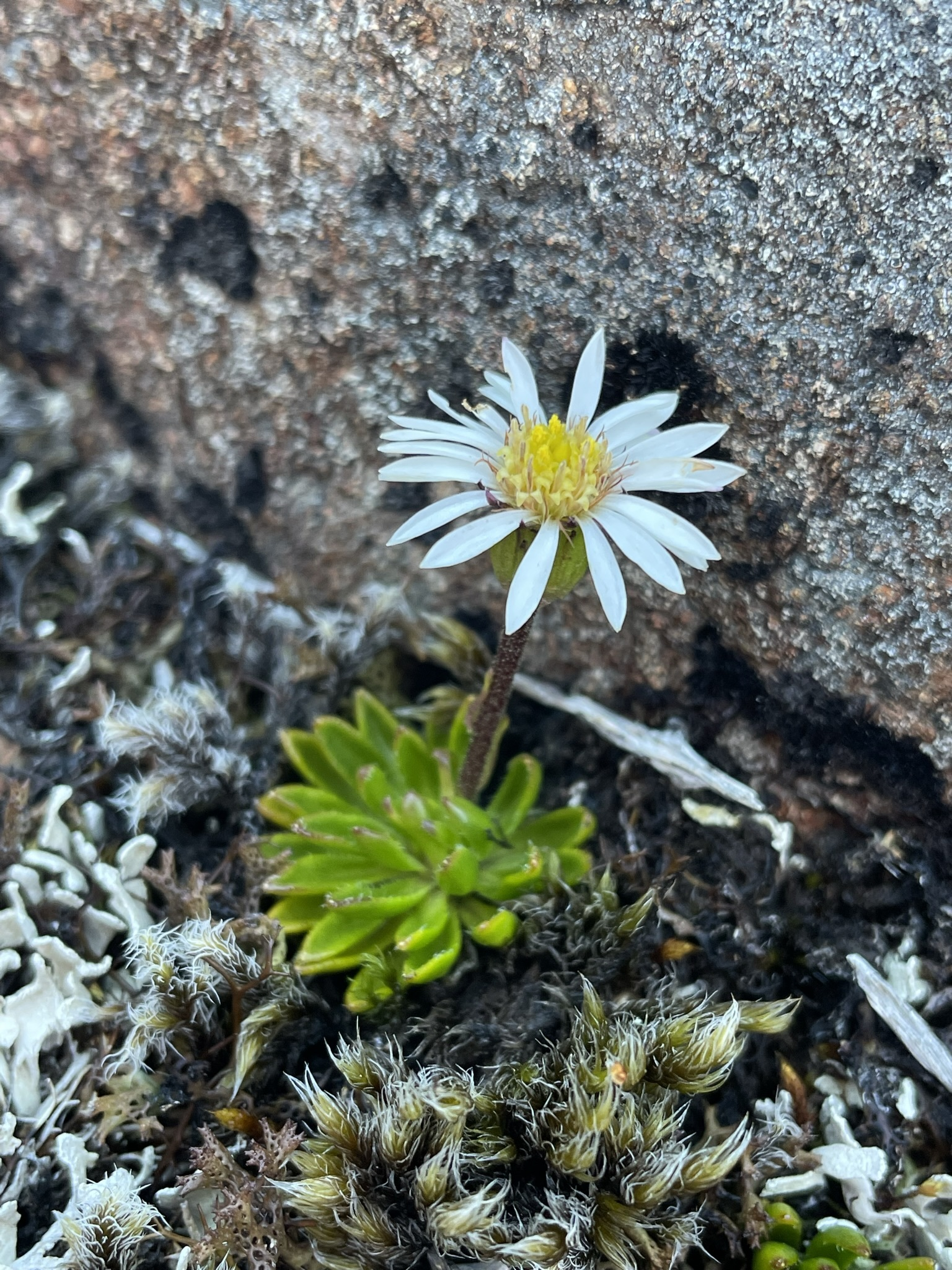
- Pappochroma stellatum

Scientific classification
- Kingdom: Plantae
- Clade: Tracheophytes
- Clade: Angiosperms
- Clade: Eudicots
- Clade: Asterids
- Order: Asterales
- Family: Asteraceae
- Subfamily: Asteroideae
- Tribe: Astereae
- Subtribe: Lagenophorinae
- Genus: Pappochroma; Raf. (1837)

Species
- 9; see text

Synonyms
- Lagenithrix G.L.Nesom (1994); Lagenopappus G.L.Nesom (1994)

= Pappochroma =

Genus of flowering plants

Pappochroma is a genus of flowering plants in the sunflower family, Asteraceae. It includes nine species native to southeastern Australia, including New South Wales, Victoria, and Tasmania.

== Species ==
Nine species are accepted.

- Pappochroma bellidioides (Hook.f.) G.L.Nesom – New South Wales, Victoria, and Tasmania
- Pappochroma gunnii (Hook.f.) G.L.Nesom – Tasmania
- Pappochroma nitidum (S.J.Forbes) G.L.Nesom – New South Wales and Victoria
- Pappochroma paludicola (S.J.Forbes) G.L.Nesom – New South Wales and Victoria
- Pappochroma pappocromum (Labill.) G.L.Nesom – Victoria and Tasmania
- Pappochroma setosum (Benth.) G.L.Nesom – New South Wales
- Pappochroma stellatum (Hook.f.) G.L.Nesom – Tasmania
- Pappochroma tasmanicum (Hook.f.) G.L.Nesom – Tasmania
- Pappochroma trigonum (S.J.Forbes & D.I.Morris) G.L.Nesom – Tasmania
