= Dichaetophora =

Dichaetophora can refer to:

- Dichaetophora (plant), a genus of the daisy family
- Dichaetophora (fly), a genus of the family Drosophilidae
