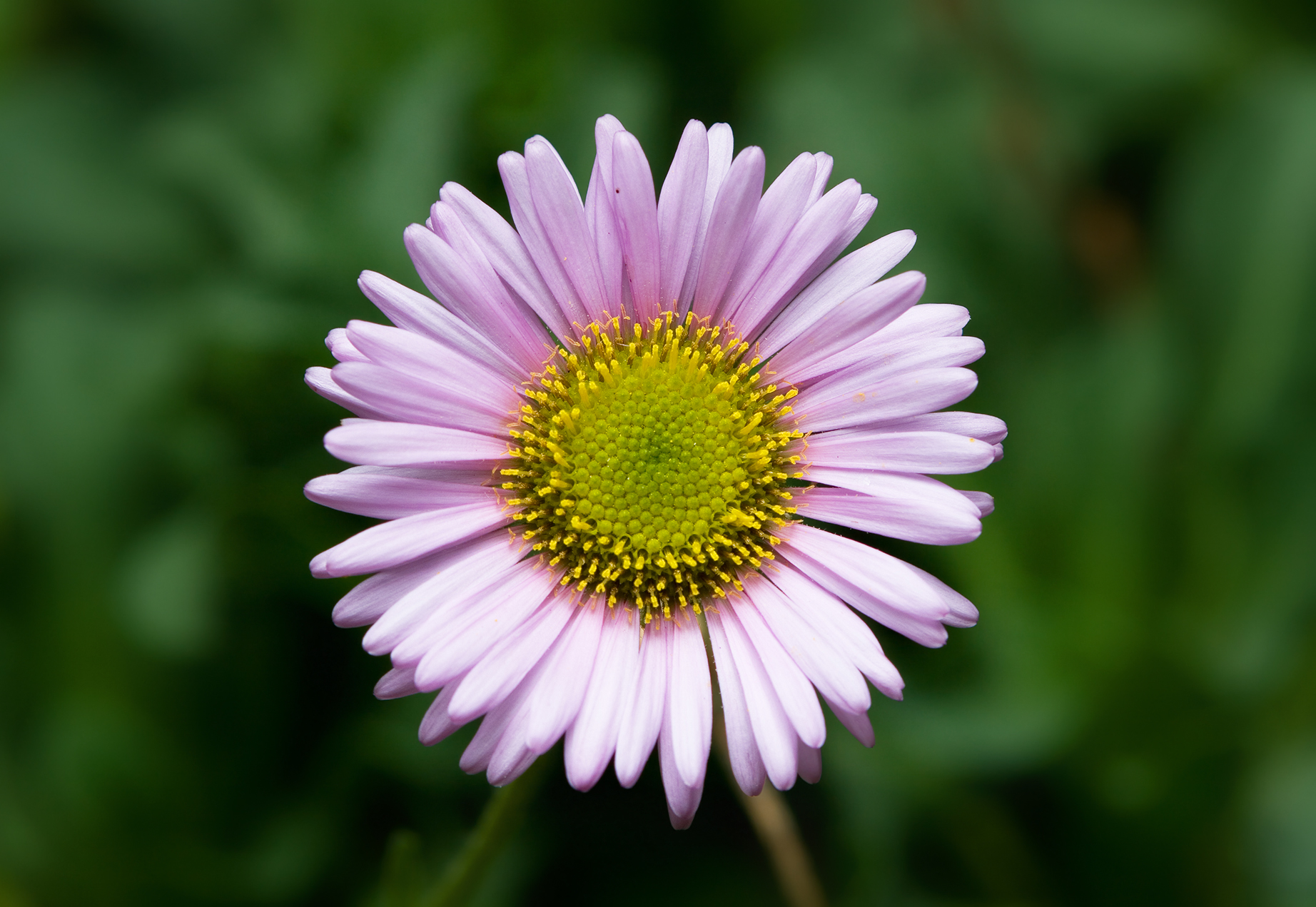
- Erigeron glaucus

Scientific classification
- Kingdom: Plantae
- Clade: Tracheophytes
- Clade: Angiosperms
- Clade: Eudicots
- Clade: Asterids
- Order: Asterales
- Family: Asteraceae
- Subfamily: Asteroideae
- Tribe: Astereae; Cass.

Genera
- See text

Synonyms
- Bellideae Cass. ex D.Don [unaccepted]

= Astereae =

Tribe of flowering plants in the aster family

Astereae is a tribe of plants in the family Asteraceae that includes annuals, biennials, perennials, subshrubs, shrubs, and trees. They are found primarily in temperate regions of the world. Plants within the tribe are present nearly worldwide divided into over 250 genera and more than 3,100 species, making it the second-largest tribe in the family behind Senecioneae.

The taxonomy of the tribe Astereae has been dramatically changed after both morphologic and molecular evidence suggested that large genera such as Aster, as well as many others, needed to be separated into several genera or shifted to better reflect the plants' relationships. A paper by R. D. Noyes and L. H. Rieseberg showed that most of the genera within the tribe in North America actually belong to a single clade, meaning they have a common ancestor. This is referred to as the North American clade. Guy L. Nesom and Harold E. Robinson have been involved in the recent work and are continuing to re-categorise the genera within the tribe worldwide.

== Subtribes ==
As of October 2024, tribe Astereae is divided into 36 accepted subtribes.

- Afroasterinae G.L.Nesom
- Asterinae (Cass.) Dumort.
- Astranthiinae G.L.Nesom
- Baccharidinae Less.
- Bellidinae Willk.
- Boltoniinae G.L.Nesom
- Brachyscominae G.L.Nesom
- Celmisiinae Saldivia
- Chaetopappinae G.L.Nesom
- Chamaegerinae G.L.Nesom
- Chiliotrichinae Bonif.
- Chrysopsidinae G.L.Nesom
- Conyzinae Horan.
- Denekiinae G.L.Nesom
- Doellingeriinae G.L.Nesom
- Egletinae G.L.Nesom
- Eschenbachiinae G.L.Nesom
- Formaniinae G.L.Nesom
- Geissolepinae G.L.Nesom
- Grangeinae Benth.
- Gutiereziinae G.L.Nesom
- Homochrominae Benth.
- Ionactinae G.L.Nesom
- Iranoasterinae G.L.Nesom
- Lagenophorinae G.L.Nesom
- Machaerantherinae G.L.Nesom
- Madagasterinae G.L.Nesom
- Mairiinae G.L.Nesom
- Nannoglottidinae G.L.Nesom
- Oclemininae G.L.Nesom
- Oritrophiinae G.L.Nesom
- Pentachaetinae G.L.Nesom
- Printziinae G.L.Nesom
- Pteroniinae G.L.Nesom
- Solidagininae O.Hoffm.
- Symphyotrichinae G.L.Nesom

== Selected genera ==
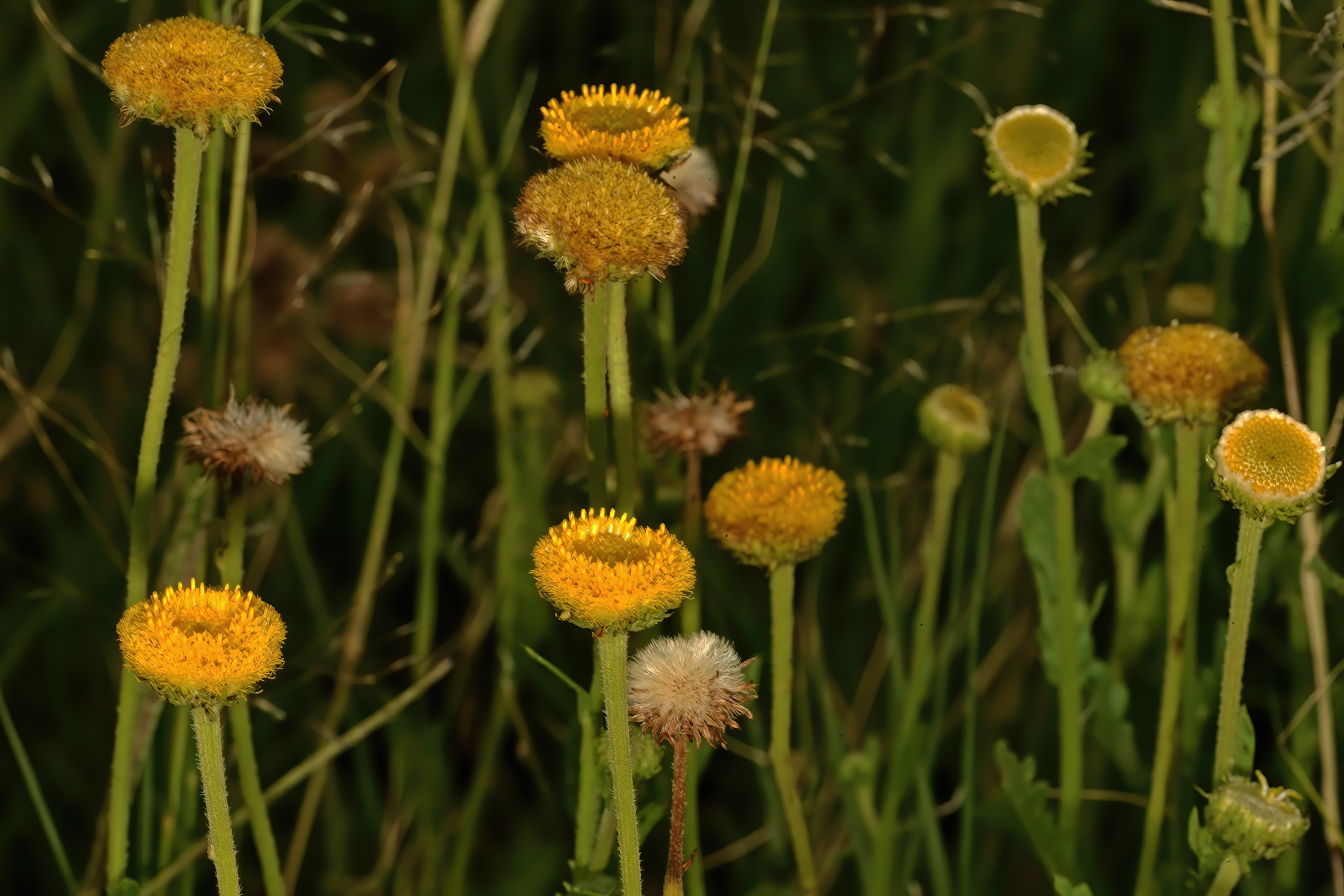
Conyza podocephala, Pretoria, Gauteng, South Africa

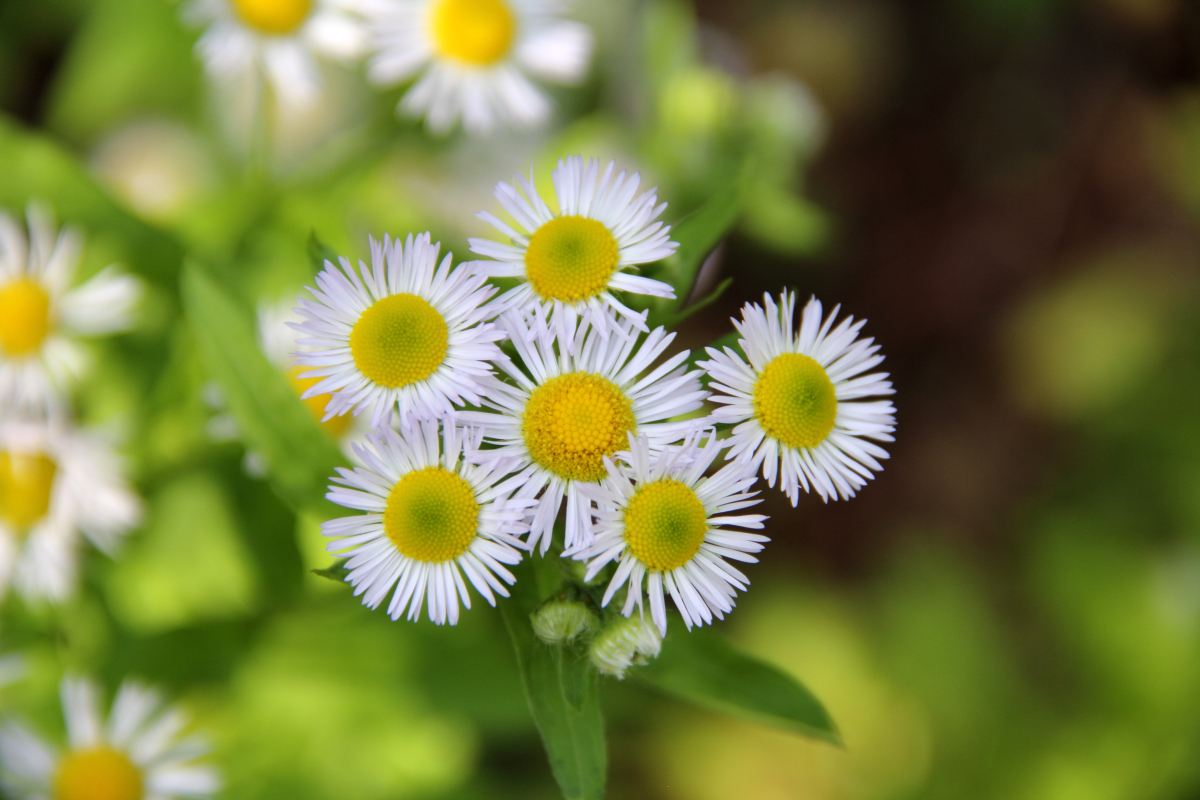
Erigeron annuus

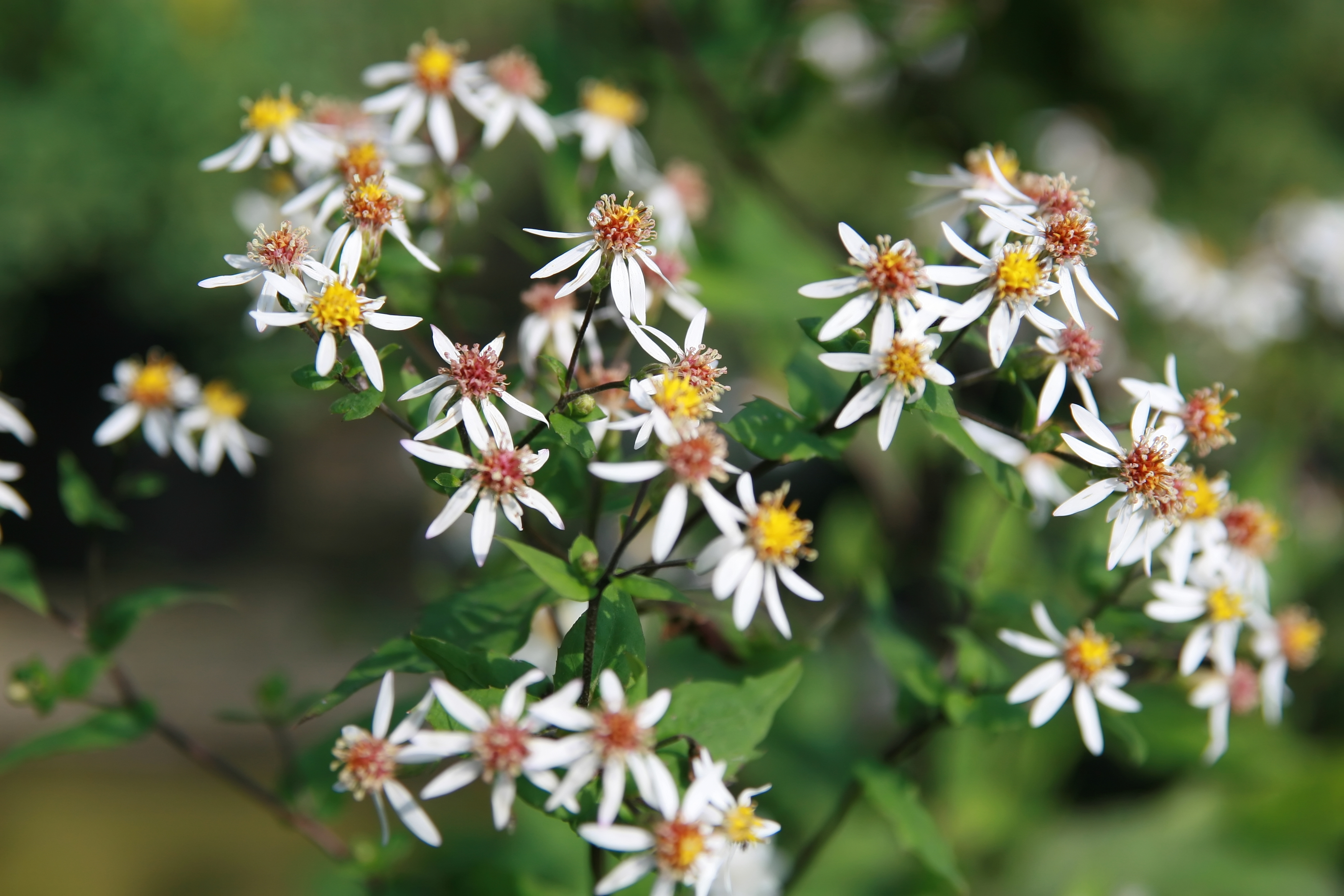
Eurybia divaricata at Behnke Nurseries, Potomac, Maryland, USA

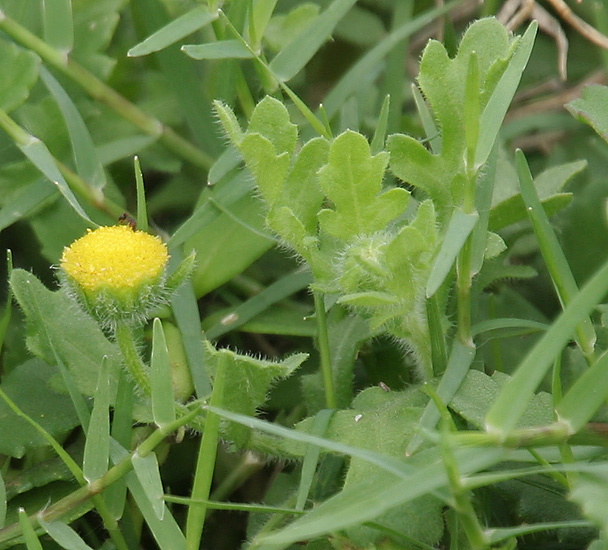
Grangea maderaspatana at Pocharam lake, Andhra Pradesh, India

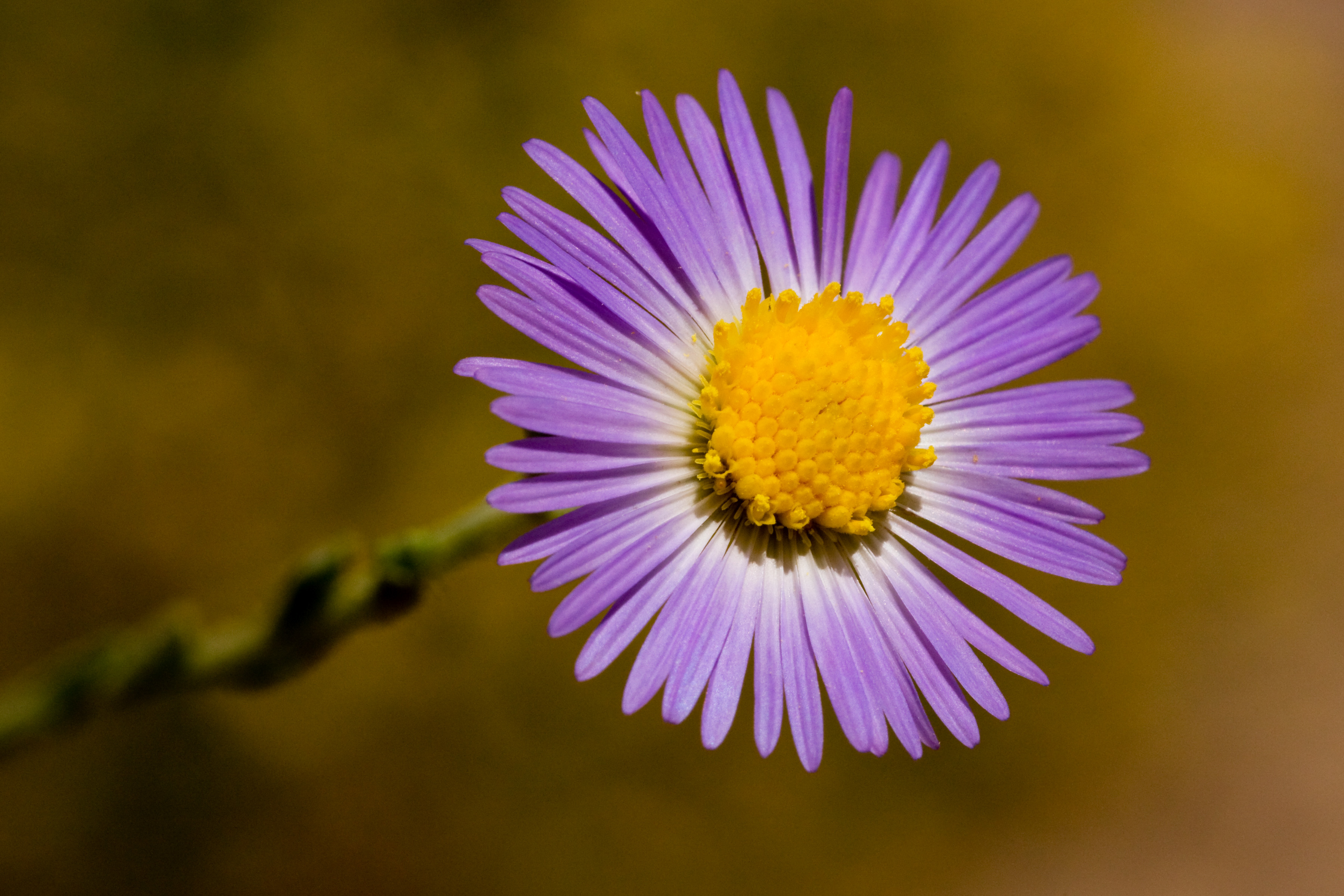
Psilactis asteroides at East Dry Lake, Otero County, New Mexico, USA

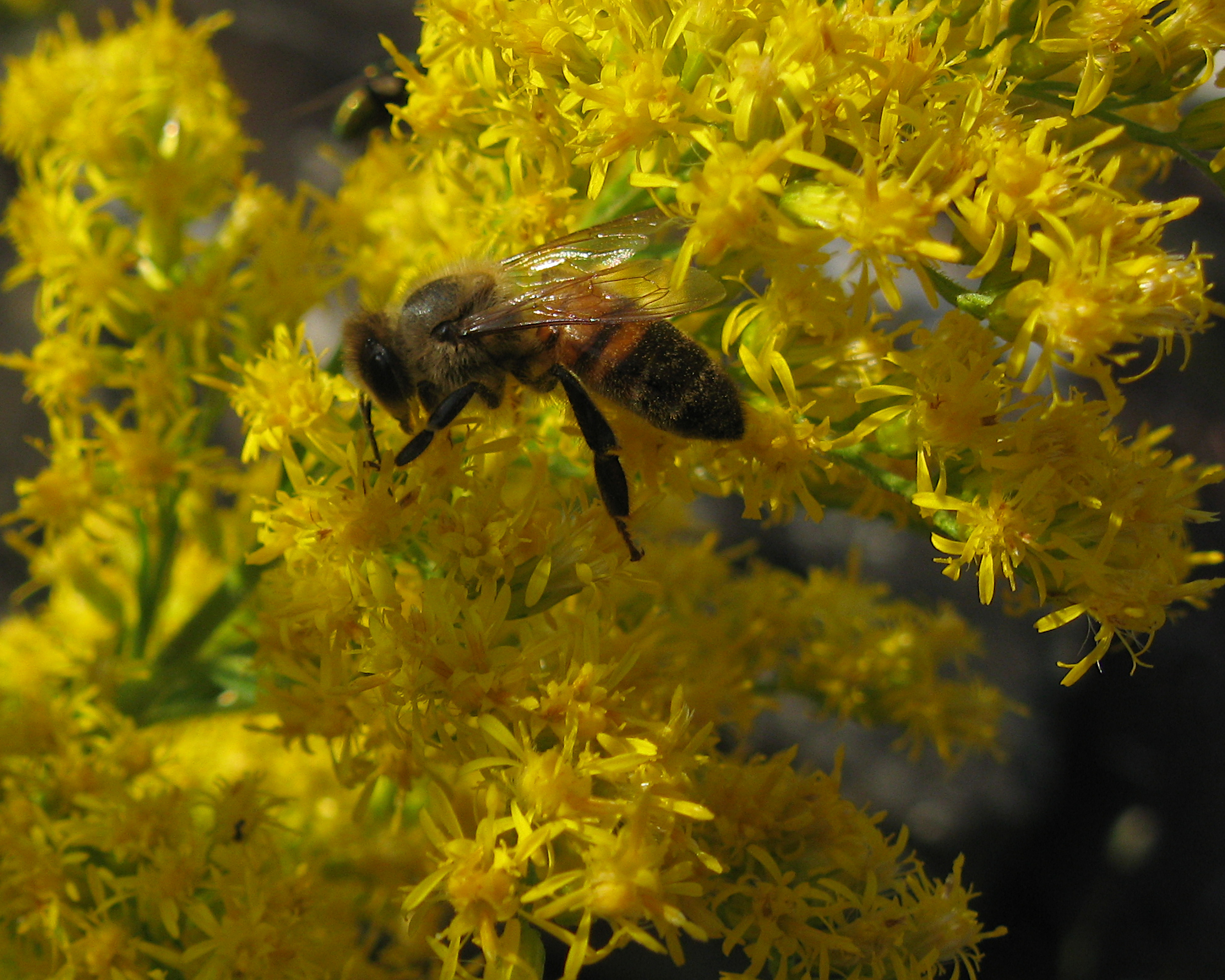
Solidago altissima with bee, Pittsburgh, Pennsylvania, USA

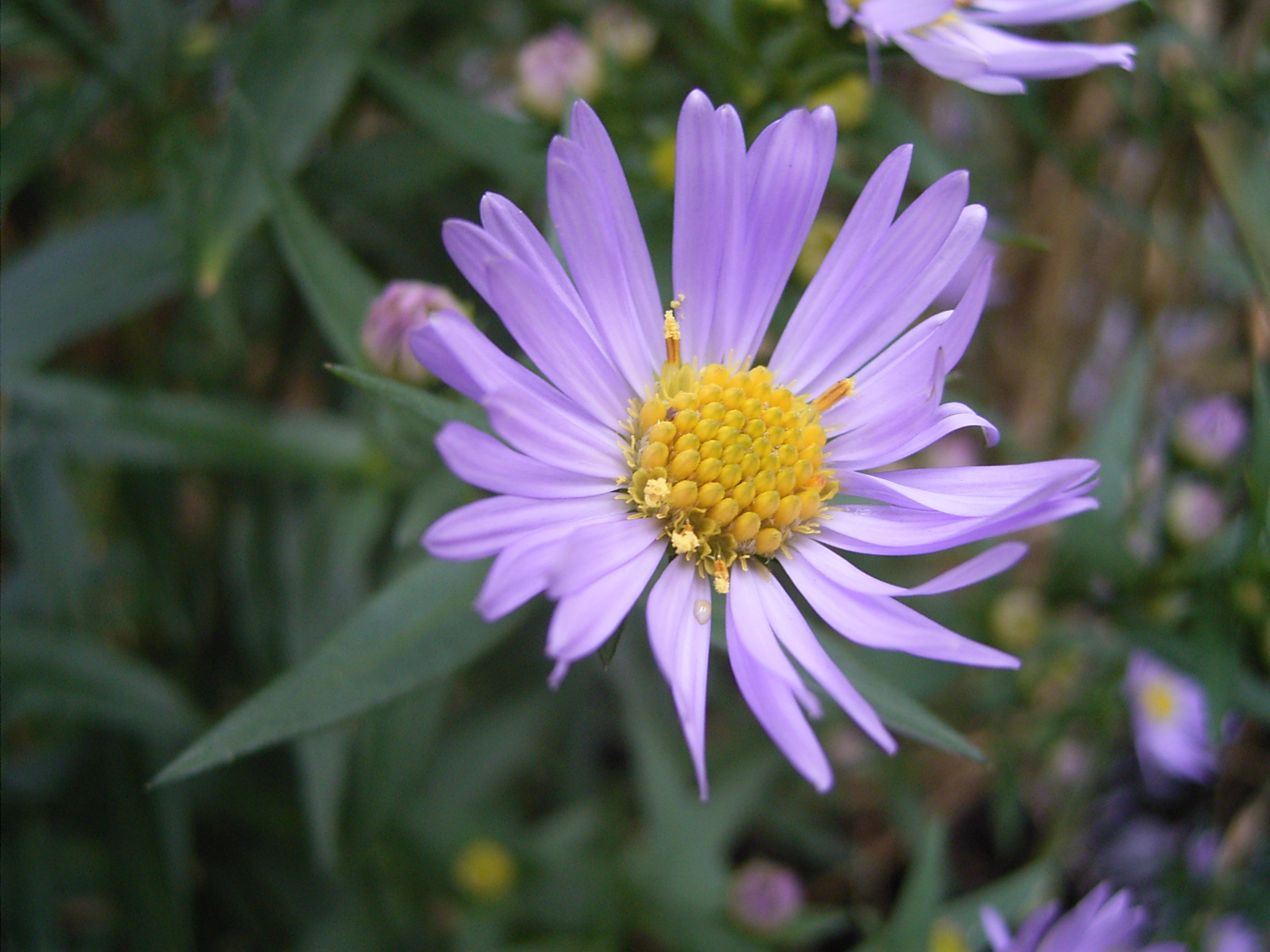
Symphyotrichum novi-belgii

- Acamptopappus (A.Gray) A.Gray
- Achnophora F. Muell.
- Almutaster Á.Löve & D.Löve
- Amellus L.
- Ampelaster G.L.Nesom
- Amphiachyris (DC.) Nutt. – broomweed
- Amphipappus Torr. & A.Gray
- Aphanostephus DC. – Lazydaisy
- Aster L.
- Astranthium Nutt. – western-daisy
- Baccharis L.
- Bellis L. – daisy
- Bellium L.
- Benitoa D.D.Keck
- Bigelowia DC. – rayless-goldenrod
- Boltonia L'Hér. – doll's-daisy
- Brachyscome Cass.
- Bradburia Torr. & A.Gray – goldenaster
- Brintonia Greene
- Callistephus Cass.
- Calotis R. Br.
- Camptacra N.T.Burb.
- Canadanthus G.L.Nesom
- Celmisia
- Centipeda Lour.
- Ceruana Forssk.
- Chaetopappa DC.
- Chiliotrichum Cass.
- Chloracantha G.L.Nesom
- Chrysocoma L.
- Chrysoma Nutt.
- Chrysopsis (Nutt.) Elliott
- Chrysothamnus Nutt. – rabbitbrush
- Columbiadoria G.L.Nesom
- Commidendrum DC.
- Conyza Less.
- Corethrogyne DC. – sandaster
- Croptilon Raf.
- Cuniculotinus Urbatsch, R.P.Roberts & Neubig – rock goldenrod
- Damnamenia Given
- Darwiniothamnus Harling
- Dichrocephala DC.
- Dichaetophora A.Gray
- Dieteria Nutt.
- Diplostephium Kunth
- Doellingeria Nees – tall flat-topped aster
- Eastwoodia Brandegee
- Egletes Cass – tropic daisy
- Ericameria Nutt. – goldenbush
- Erigeron L. – fleabane
- Eucephalus Nutt.
- Eurybia (Cass.) Cass.
- Euthamia (Nutt.) Cass.
- Felicia Cass.
- Formania W.W.Sm. & J.Small
- Galatella Cass.
- Geissolepis B.L.Rob.
- Grangea Adans.
- Grindelia Willd. – gum-plant, resin-weed
- Gundlachia A.Gray – goldenshrub
- Gutierrezia Lag.
- Gymnosperma Less. – gumhead, sticky selloa
- Haplopappus
- Hazardia Greene – bristleweed
- Herrickia Wooton & Standl.
- Heterotheca Cass.
- Hysterionica Willd.
- Ionactis Greene – ankle-aster
- Isocoma Nutt. – jimmyweed, goldenweed
- Kalimeris (Cass.) Cass.
- Kemulariella Tamamsch.
- Kippistia F. Muell. – fleshy minuria
- Lachnophyllum Bunge
- Laennecia Cass.
- Lagenophora Cass.
- Lessingia Cham.
- Lorandersonia Urbatsch et al. – rabbitbush
- Machaeranthera Nees
- Miyamayomena Kitam.
- Monoptilon Torr. & A.Gray – desertstar
- Myriactis Less.
- Nestotus Urbatsch, R.P.Roberts & Neubig – goldenweed, mock goldenweed
- Nolletia Cass.
- Oclemena Greene
- Olearia Moench
- Oligoneuron Small
- Oonopsis (Nutt.) Greene
- Oreochrysum (A.Gray) Rydb.
- Oreostemma Greene – mountaincrown
- Oritrophium (Kunth) Cuatrec.
- Pachystegia (Hook. f.) Cheeseman
- Pentachaeta Nutt. – pygmydaisy
- Peripleura (N. T. Burb.) G.L.Nesom
- Petradoria Greene – rock goldenrod
- Pleurophyllum Hook.f.
- Podocoma Cass.
- Polyarrhena Cass.
- Psiadia Jacq.
- Psilactis A.Gray
- Psychrogeton Boiss.
- Pteronia L.
- Pyrrocoma Hook. – goldenweed
- Rayjacksonia R.L.Hartm.
- Remya Hillebr. ex Benth. & Hook.f.
- Rhynchospermum Reinw.
- Rigiopappus A.Gray – wireweed
- Sericocarpus Nees – white-topped aster
- Sheareria S.Moore
- Solidago L.
- Stenotus Nutt. – goldenweed, mock goldenweed
- Symphyotrichum Nees
- Tetramolopium – Pamakani
- Thurovia Rose
- Toiyabea R.P.Roberts
- Tonestus A.Nelson – serpentweed
- Townsendia Hook.
- Tracyina S.F.Blake
- Triniteurybia Brou.
- Tripolium Nees
- Vittadinia A. Rich.
- Xanthisma DC. – sleepydaisy
- Xanthocephalum Willd.
- Xylorhiza Nutt. – woody-aster

Sources: FNA, E+M, UniProt, NHNSW, AFPD
