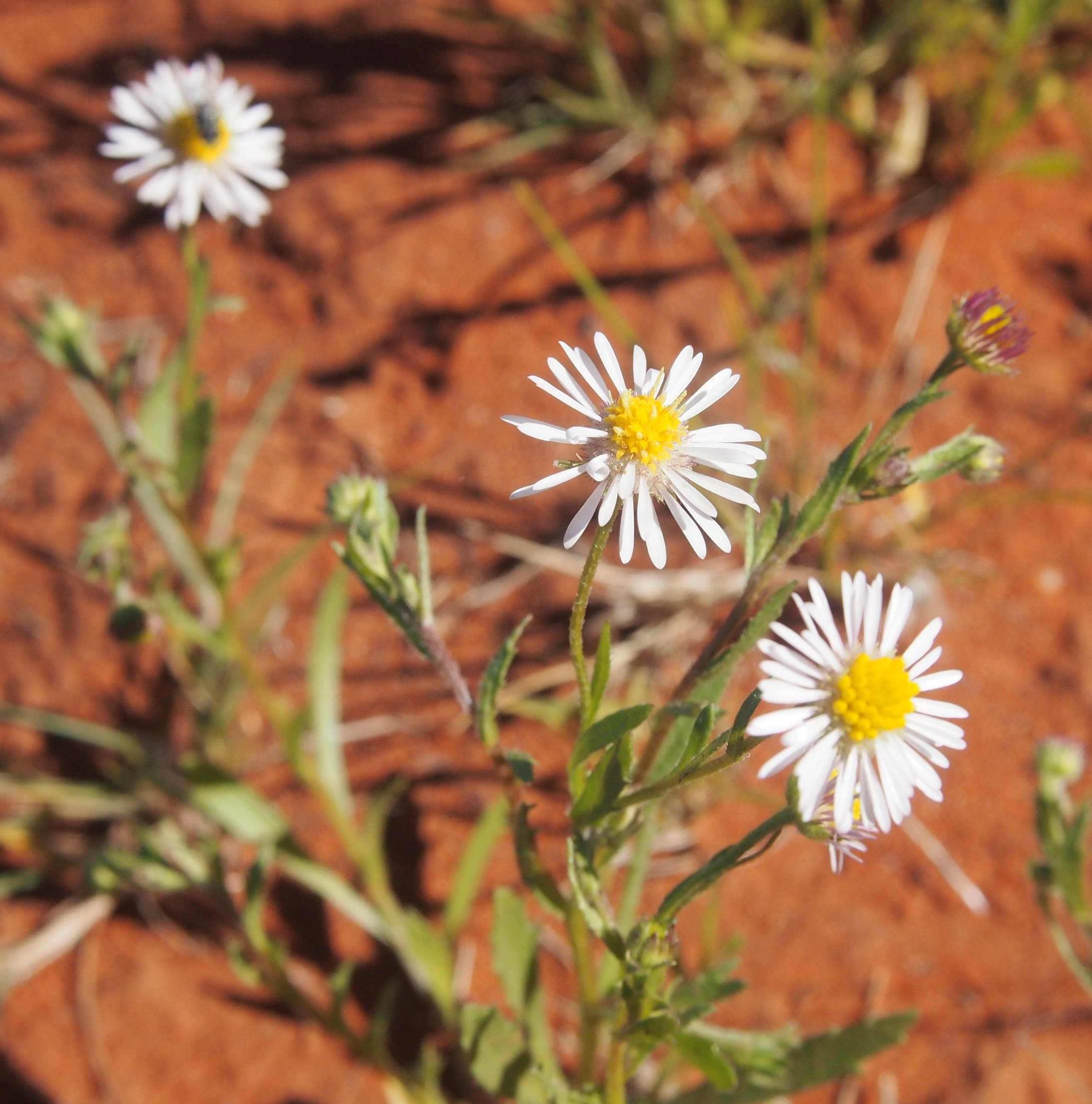
- Peripleura arida

Scientific classification
- Kingdom: Plantae
- Clade: Tracheophytes
- Clade: Angiosperms
- Clade: Eudicots
- Clade: Asterids
- Order: Asterales
- Family: Asteraceae
- Subfamily: Asteroideae
- Tribe: Astereae
- Subtribe: Brachyscominae
- Genus: Peripleura (N.T.Burb.) G.L.Nesom

= Peripleura =

Genus of flowering plants

Peripleura is a genus of flowering plants in the family Asteraceae.

== Species ==
The following species are recognised in the genus Peripleura:

- Peripleura arida (N.T.Burb.) G.L.Nesom
- Peripleura bicolor (N.T.Burb.) G.L.Nesom
- Peripleura diffusa (N.T.Burb.) G.L.Nesom
- Peripleura hispidula (F.Muell. ex A.Gray) G.L.Nesom
- Peripleura obovata (N.T.Burb.) G.L.Nesom
- Peripleura scabra (DC.) G.L.Nesom
- Peripleura sericea (N.T.Burb.) G.L.Nesom
- Peripleura spechtii (N.T.Burb.) G.L.Nesom
- Peripleura virgata (N.T.Burb.) G.L.Nesom
