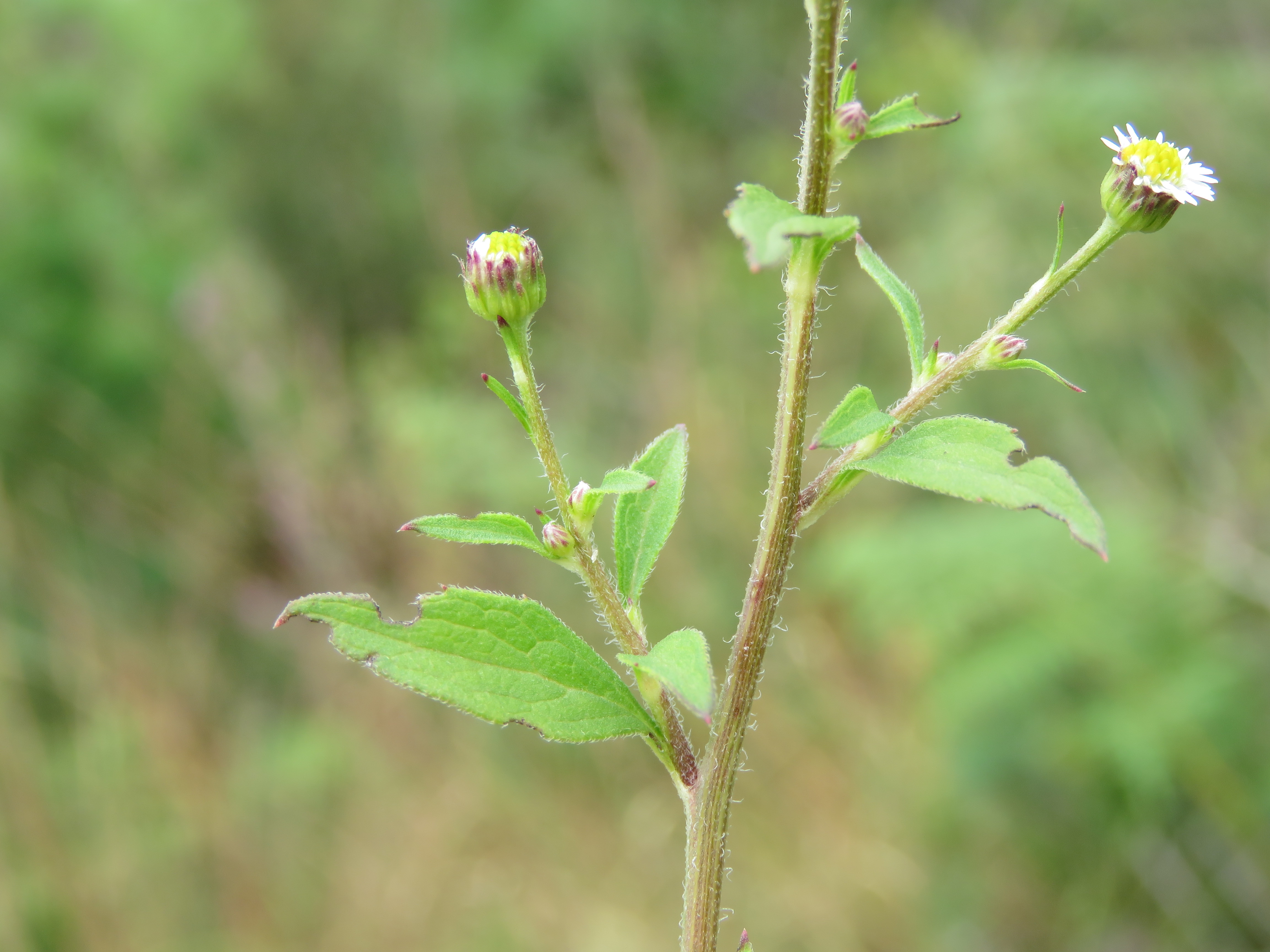
- Myriactis nepalensis in Bhutan

Scientific classification
- Kingdom: Plantae
- Clade: Tracheophytes
- Clade: Angiosperms
- Clade: Eudicots
- Clade: Asterids
- Order: Asterales
- Family: Asteraceae
- Subfamily: Asteroideae
- Tribe: Astereae
- Subtribe: Asterinae
- Genus: Myriactis; Less.

Synonyms
- Botryadenia Fisch. & C.A.Mey.

= Myriactis =

Genus of flowering plants

Myriactis is a genus of flowering plants in the tribe Astereae within the family Asteraceae.

Species

- Myriactis andina (V.M.Badillo) M.C.Velez – Costa Rica, Venezuela
- Myriactis assamensis C.E.C.Fisch. – Meghalaya, Nagaland
- Myriactis cabrerae J.Kost. – New Guinea
- Myriactis delavayi Gagnep. – Sichuan, Yunnan, Vietnam
- Myriactis humilis Merr. – Philippines, Taiwan
- Myriactis japonensis Koidz. – Kyushu
- Myriactis javanica (Blume) DC. – Himalayas, southeast Asia
- Myriactis longipedunculata Hayata – Taiwan
- Myriactis minuscula (Cuatrec.) Cuatrec. – Panama
- Myriactis nepalensis Less. – China, Indian subcontinent, southeast Asia
- Myriactis panamensis (S.F.Blake) Cuatrec. – Panama, Costa Rica
- Myriactis rupestris J.Kost. – southeast Asia
- Myriactis sakirana (Cuatrec.) Cuatrec. – Costa Rica
- Myriactis wallichii Less. – China, Indian subcontinent, southeast Asia, Iran, Azerbaijan
- Myriactis westonii (Cuatrec.) Cuatrec. – Costa Rica
- Myriactis wightii DC. – China, Tibet, India, Sri Lanka, Vietnam, Maluku
