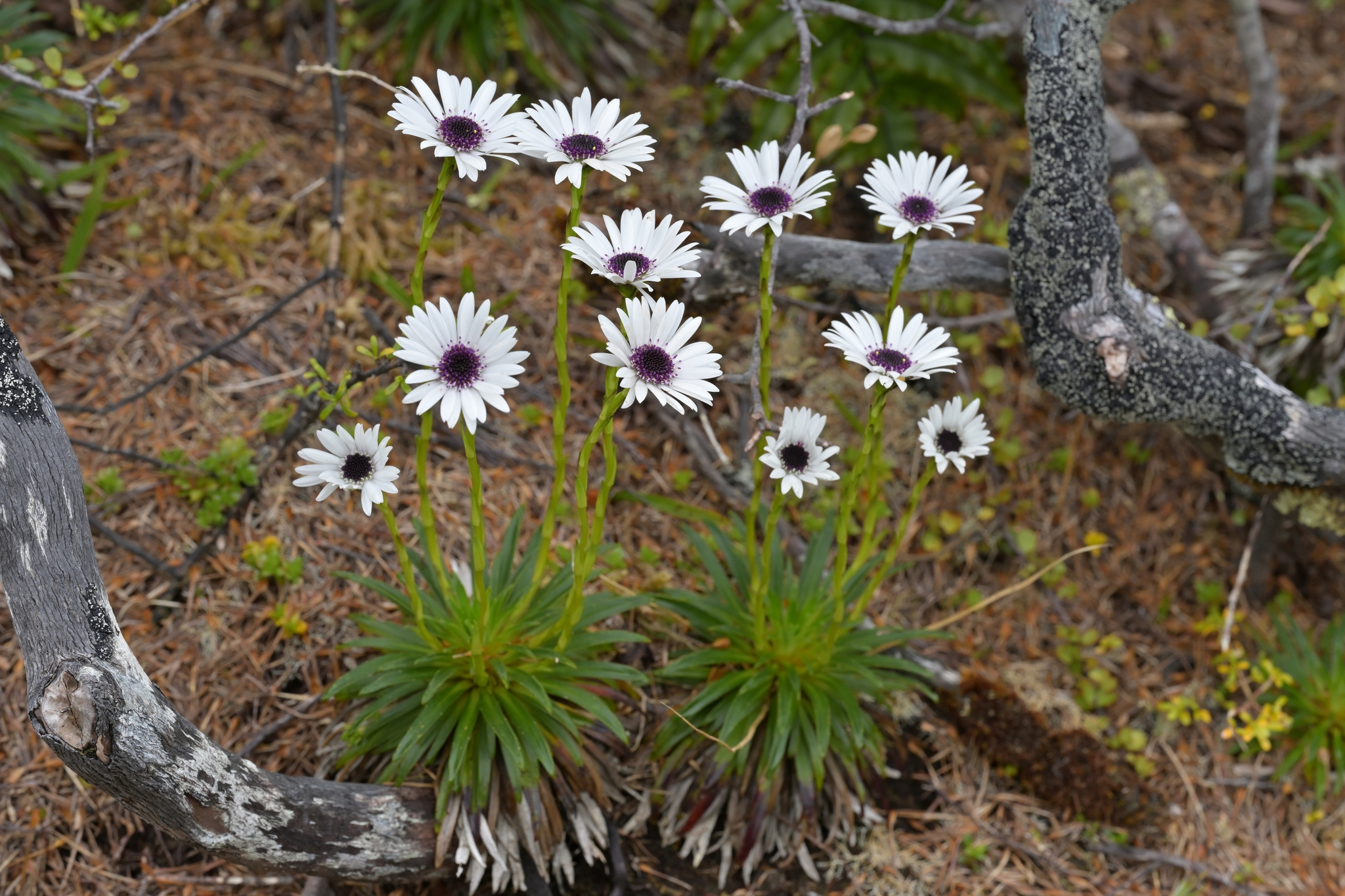
- Damnamenia vernicosa growing on Campbell Island

Conservation status
- Naturally Uncommon (NZ TCS)

Scientific classification
- Kingdom: Plantae
- Clade: Tracheophytes
- Clade: Angiosperms
- Clade: Eudicots
- Clade: Asterids
- Order: Asterales
- Family: Asteraceae
- Subfamily: Asteroideae
- Tribe: Astereae
- Subtribe: Celmisiinae
- Genus: Damnamenia; Given
- Species: D. vernicosa

Binomial name
- Damnamenia vernicosa (Hook.f.) Given

Synonyms
- Celmisia sect. Antarcticae Allan; Celmisia subg. Ionopsis Hook.f.; Celmisia vernicosa Hook.f.; Elcismia vernicosa (Hook.f.) B.L.Rob.; Celmisia vernicosa var. mollicula Allan; Aster vernicosus (Hook.f.) F.Muell.; Aster vernicifluus F.Muell.

= Damnamenia =

Black-eyed daisy

Genus of flowering plants

Damnamenia is a genus of flowering plants in the family Asteraceae.

The only known species is Damnamenia vernicosa, called the black-eyed daisy. It is endemic to New Zealand (Auckland and Campbell Islands).

== Description ==
Damnamenia vernicosa is a small, perennial, stoloniferous herb. It has glossy green leaves and white daisy flowers with dark purple centres. The plant flowers from November to January and fruits from December to March.

== Distribution and habitat ==
The plant is endemic to New Zealand's subantarctic Auckland and Campbell Islands. Its preferred habitats are upland cushion bogs and Pleurophyllum-dominated herbfields. It also grows at lower elevations in exposed and sparsely vegetated sites.

== Taxonomy and naming ==
It was first described in 1844 as Celmisia vernicosa by Joseph Hooker. In 2012, David Given separated C. vernicosa from Celmisia and from related genera on the basis of its morphology, and allocated it to the new genus, Damnamenia. Given named the genus Damnamenia for the Dactyl, Damnamenius, since Celmisia was named for Celmis, another Dactyl. The specific epithet, vernicosa, is the Latin adjective, vernicosus,-a, -um, meaning "varnished", and refers to the apparently varnished leaves.

== Conservation status ==
The species is listed as "At Risk – Naturally Uncommon" on the most recent (2018) New Zealand Threatened Classification for plants, because of its restricted range).

== Gallery ==
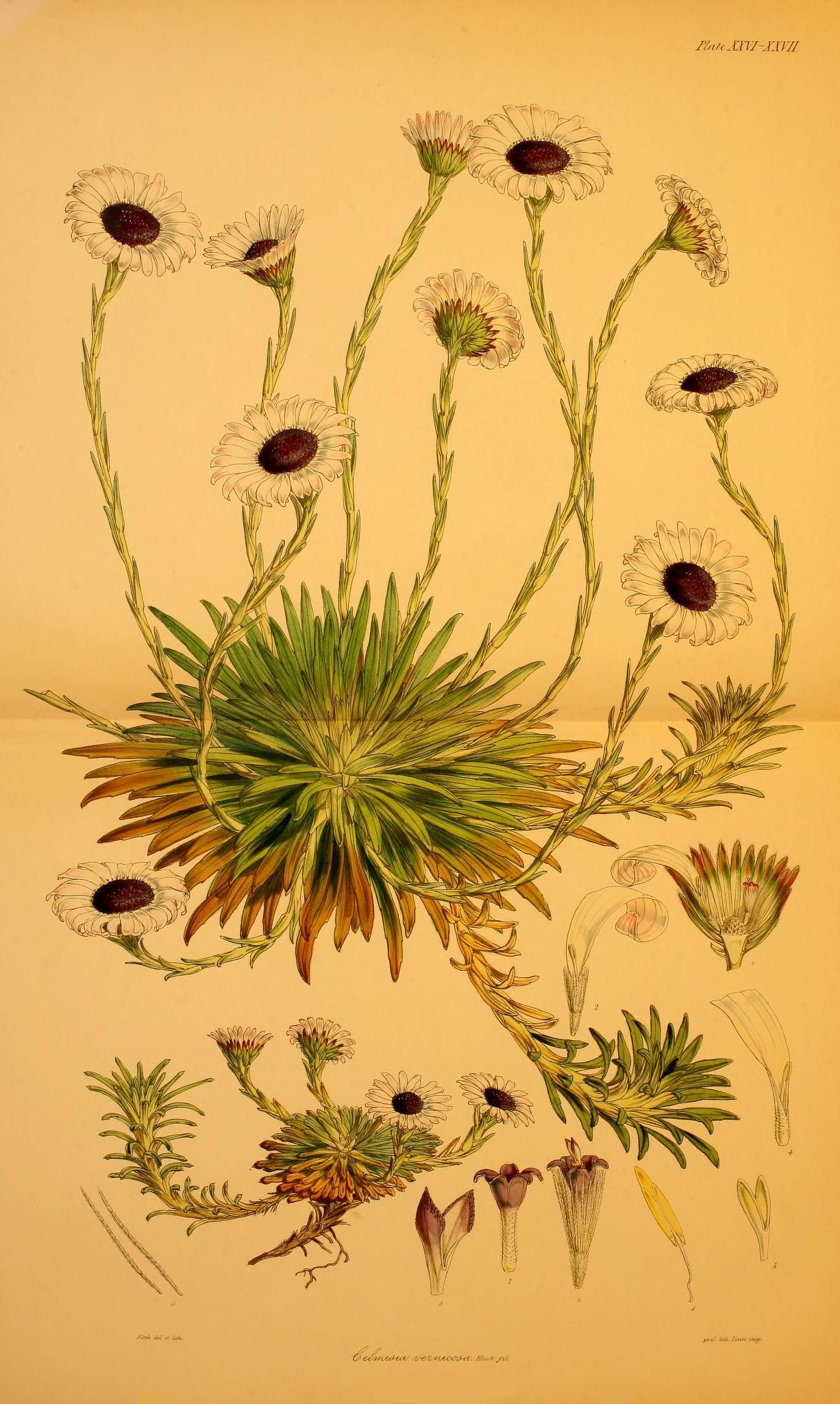
Damnamenia vernicosa as Celmisia vernicosa (Plates XXVI-XXVII Fitch)

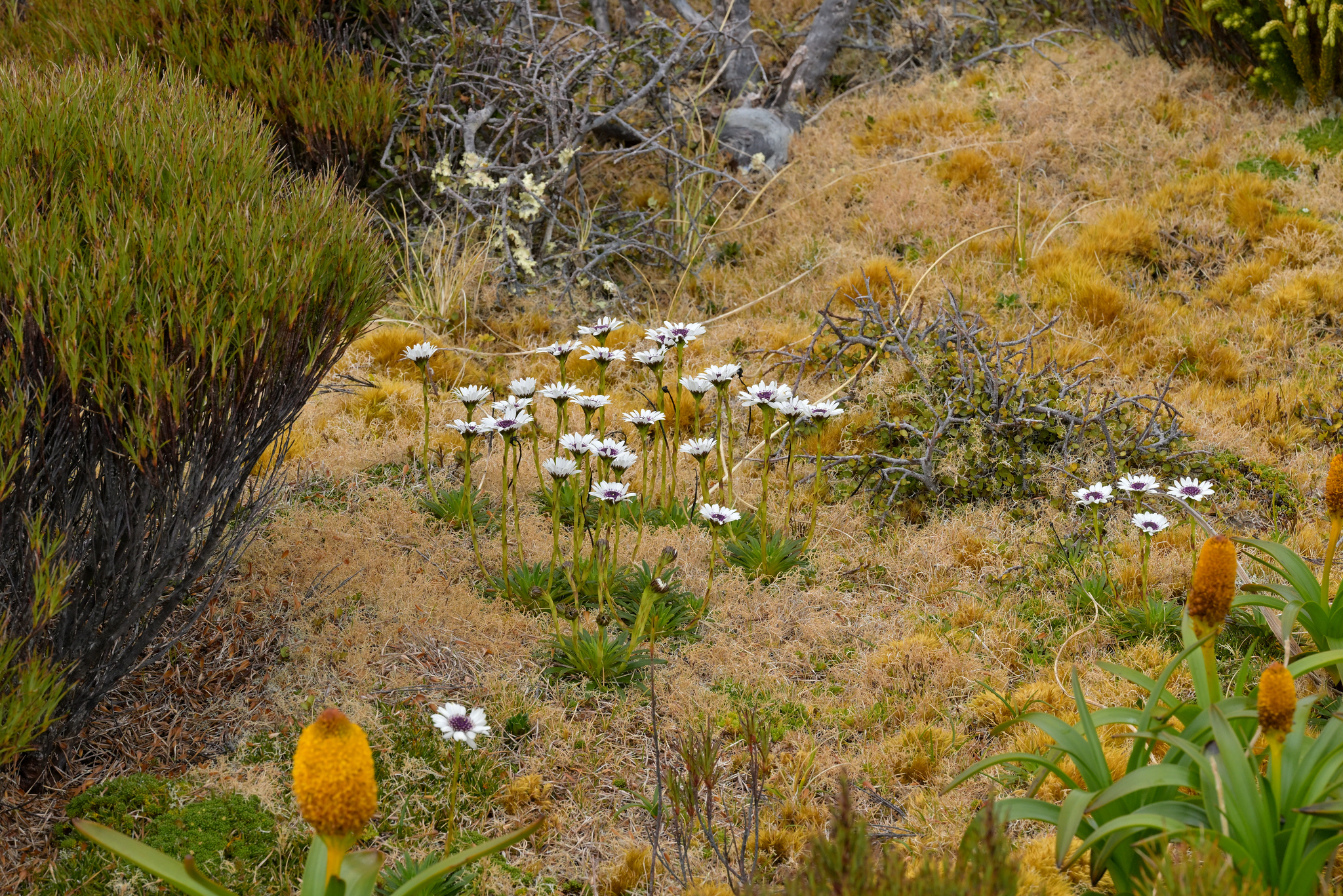
Damnamenia vernicosa growing among other flora on Campbell Island

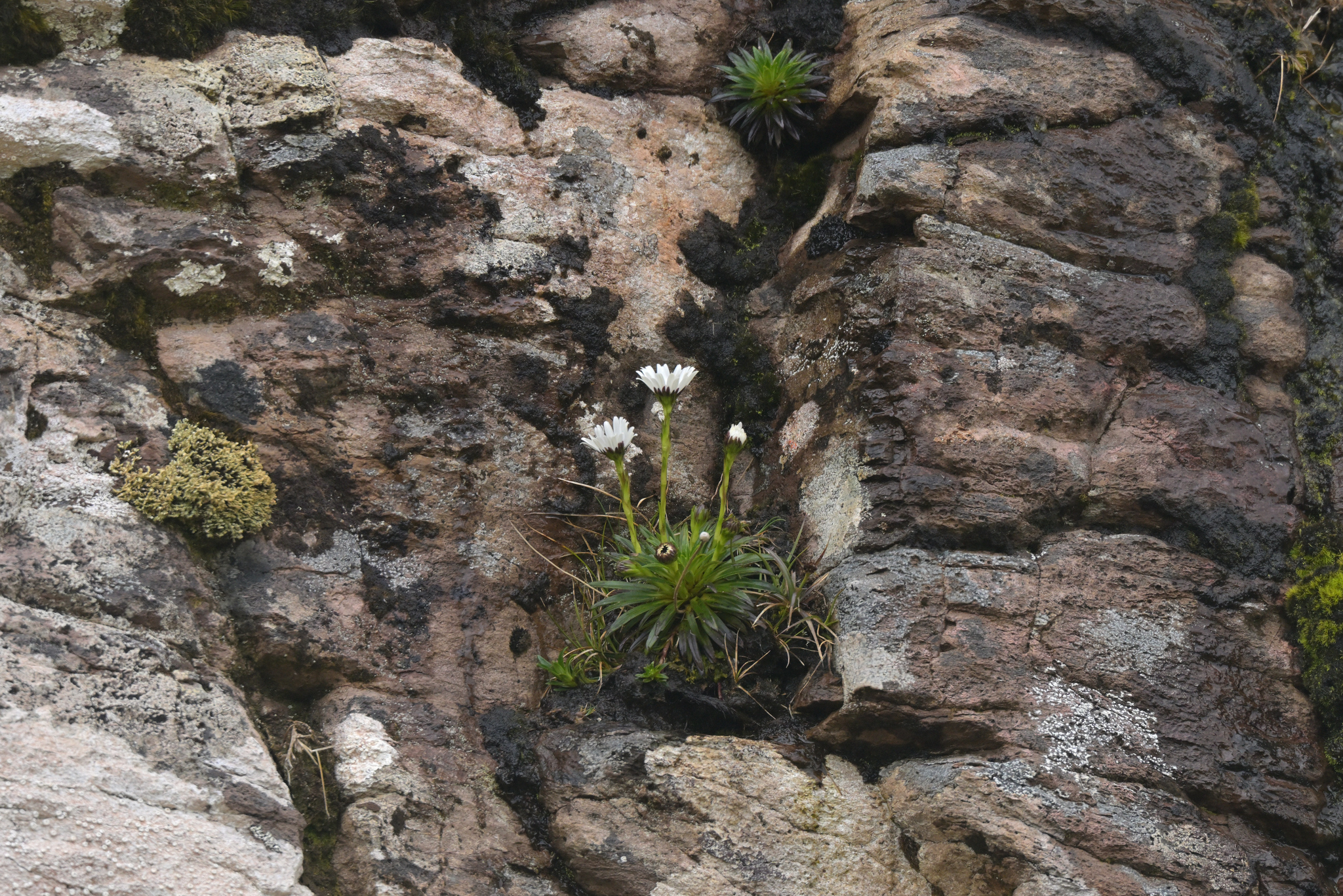
Damnamenia vernicosa growing on a cliff face on Campbell Island

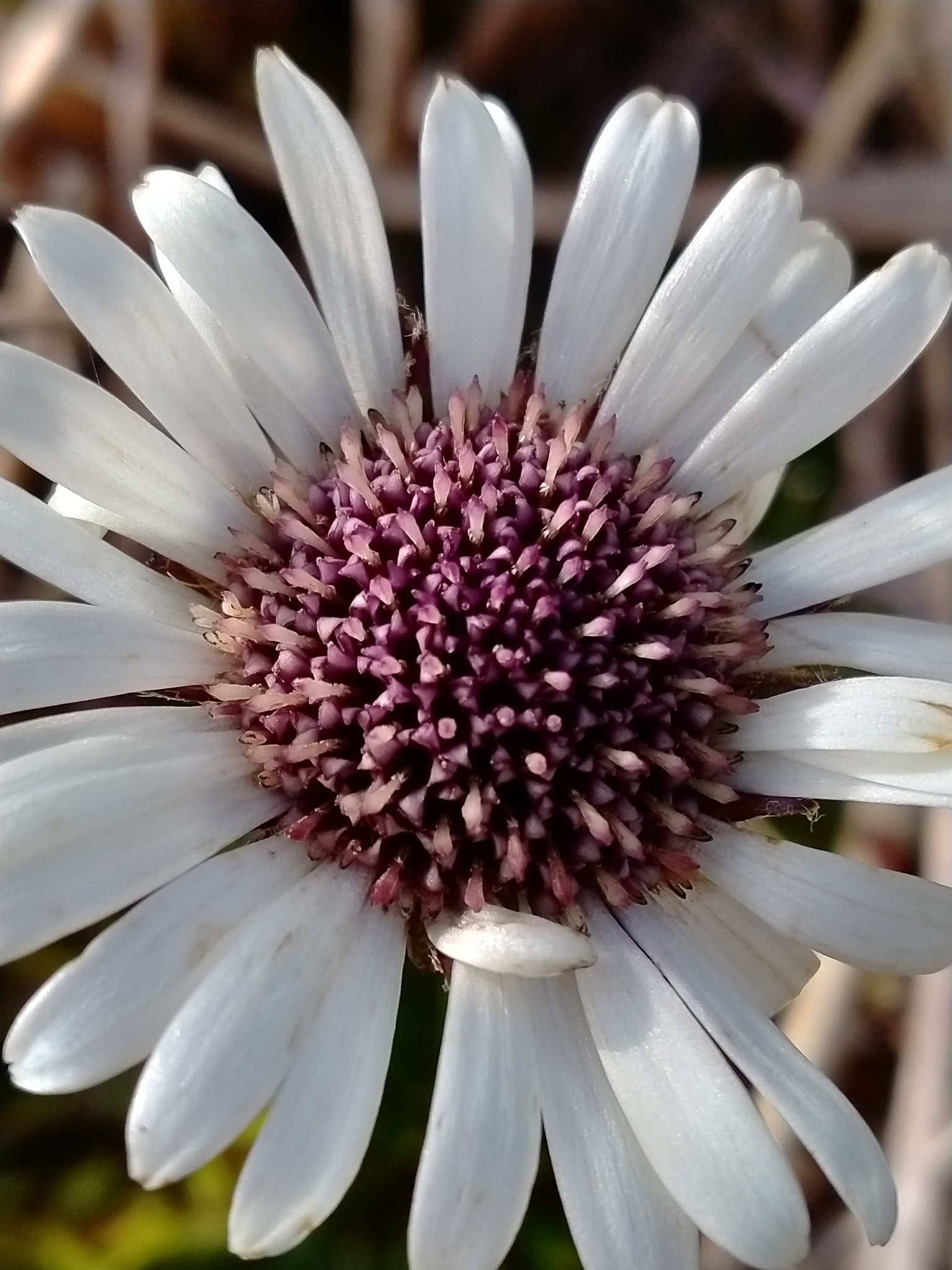
Close-up of a Damnamenia vernicosa flower
