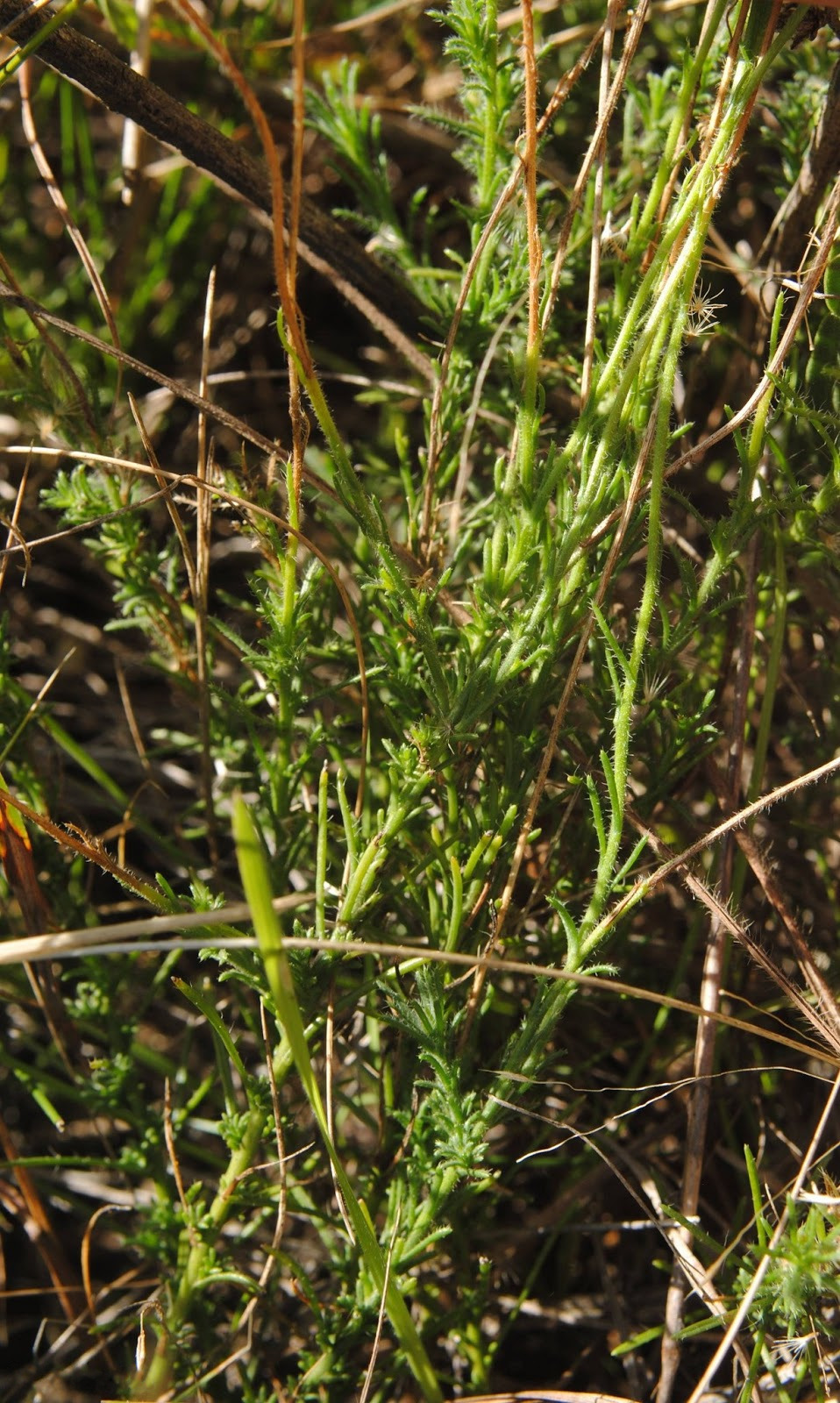
- Hysterionica filiformis

Scientific classification
- Kingdom: Plantae
- Clade: Tracheophytes
- Clade: Angiosperms
- Clade: Eudicots
- Clade: Asterids
- Order: Asterales
- Family: Asteraceae
- Subfamily: Asteroideae
- Tribe: Astereae
- Subtribe: Conyzinae
- Genus: Hysterionica; Willd.

= Hysterionica =

Genus of flowering plants

Hysterionica is a genus of flowering plants in the family Asteraceae.

Species

- Hysterionica aberrans (Cabrera) Cabrera - Tucumán
- Hysterionica bakeri Hicken - Catamarca, Jujuy, Córdoba, Salta, Tucumán, Santiago del Estero, Chaco, Bolivia
- Hysterionica cabrerae Ariza - La Rioja, San Juan, Mendoza
- Hysterionica dianthifolia (Griseb.) Cabrera - Córdoba
- Hysterionica filiformis (Spreng.) Cabrera - Rio Grande do Sul, Uruguay, Entre Ríos
- Hysterionica glaucifolia (Kuntze) Solbrig - Mendoza
- Hysterionica gracilis (Don ex Sweet) Benth. & Hook.f. - Uruguay
- Hysterionica jasionoides Willd. - Argentina (from Jujuy to Santa Cruz)
- Hysterionica montevidensis Baker - Paraguay, Uruguay, Rio Grande do Sul, Corrientes, Entre Ríos, Misiones
- Hysterionica pinifolia (Poir.) Baker - Uruguay, Rio Grande do Sul, Buenos Aires
- Hysterionica pinnatiloba Matzenb. & Sobral - Rio Grande do Sul
- Hysterionica pinnatisecta Matzenb. & Sobral - Rio Grande do Sul, Santa Catarina
- Hysterionica pulchella Cabrera - Catamarca, La Rioja, Salta, Tucumán
