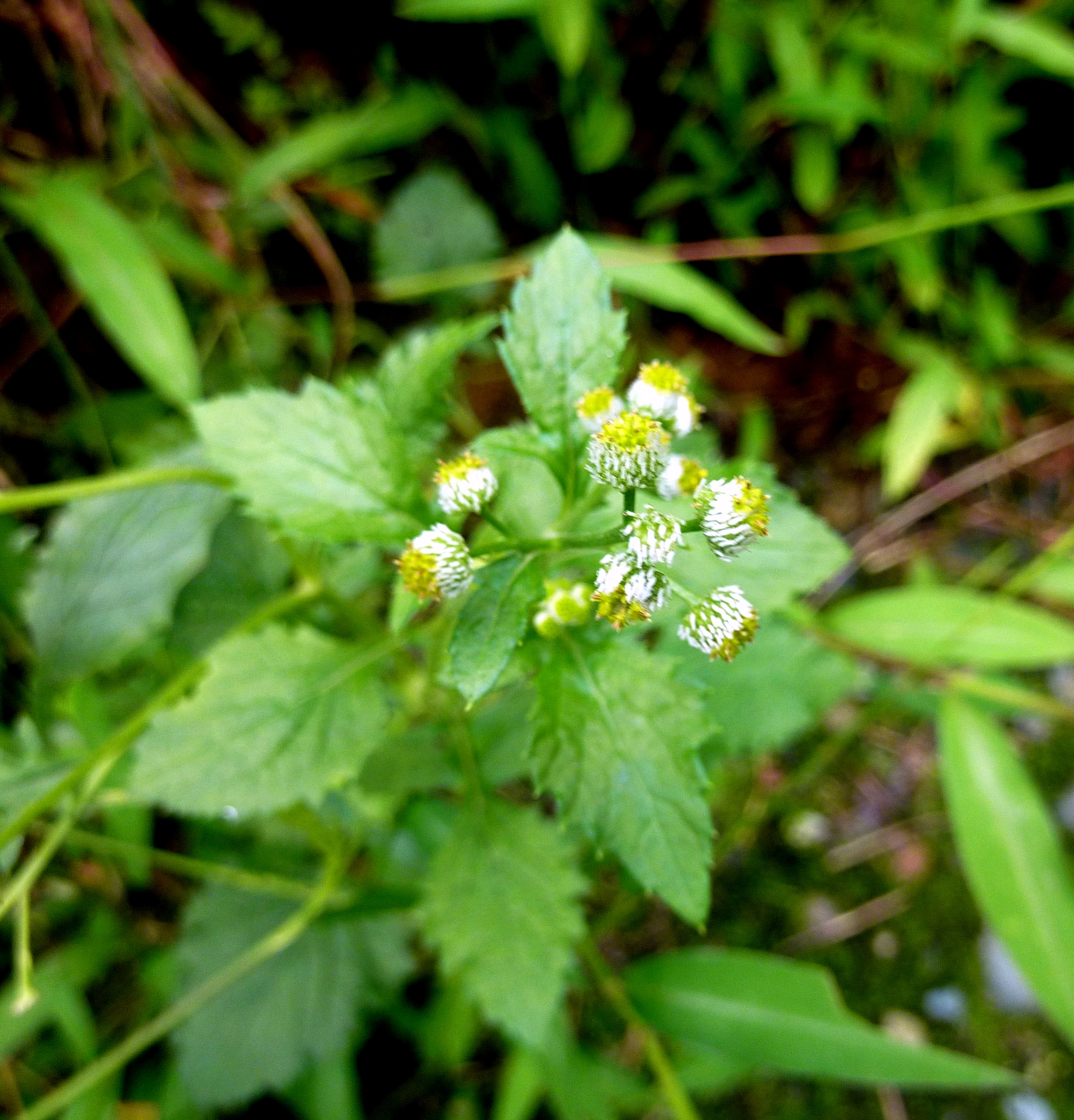
- Dichrocephala integrifolia

Scientific classification
- Kingdom: Plantae
- Clade: Embryophytes
- Clade: Tracheophytes
- Clade: Angiosperms
- Clade: Eudicots
- Clade: Asterids
- Order: Asterales
- Family: Asteraceae
- Subfamily: Asteroideae
- Tribe: Astereae
- Subtribe: Grangeinae
- Genus: Dichrocephala; L'Hér. ex DC.

= Dichrocephala =

Genus of flowering plants

Dichrocephala is a genus of flowering plants in the family Asteraceae, native to tropical Africa and southern Asia.

Species

- Dichrocephala benthamii C.B.Clarke – China, Indian Subcontinent, Indochina
- Dichrocephala chrysanthemifolia (Blume) DC. – tropical Africa, Arabian Peninsula, Indian Subcontinent, Tibet, southwestern China, Indochina, Japan, Java, Philippines
- Dichrocephala gossypina Baker – Madagascar
- Dichrocephala integrifolia (L.f.) Kuntze – tropical and southern Africa, Madagascar, Yemen, Turkey, Caucasus, Iran, China, Southeast Asia, New Guinea, Australia, some Pacific Islands including Hawaii
