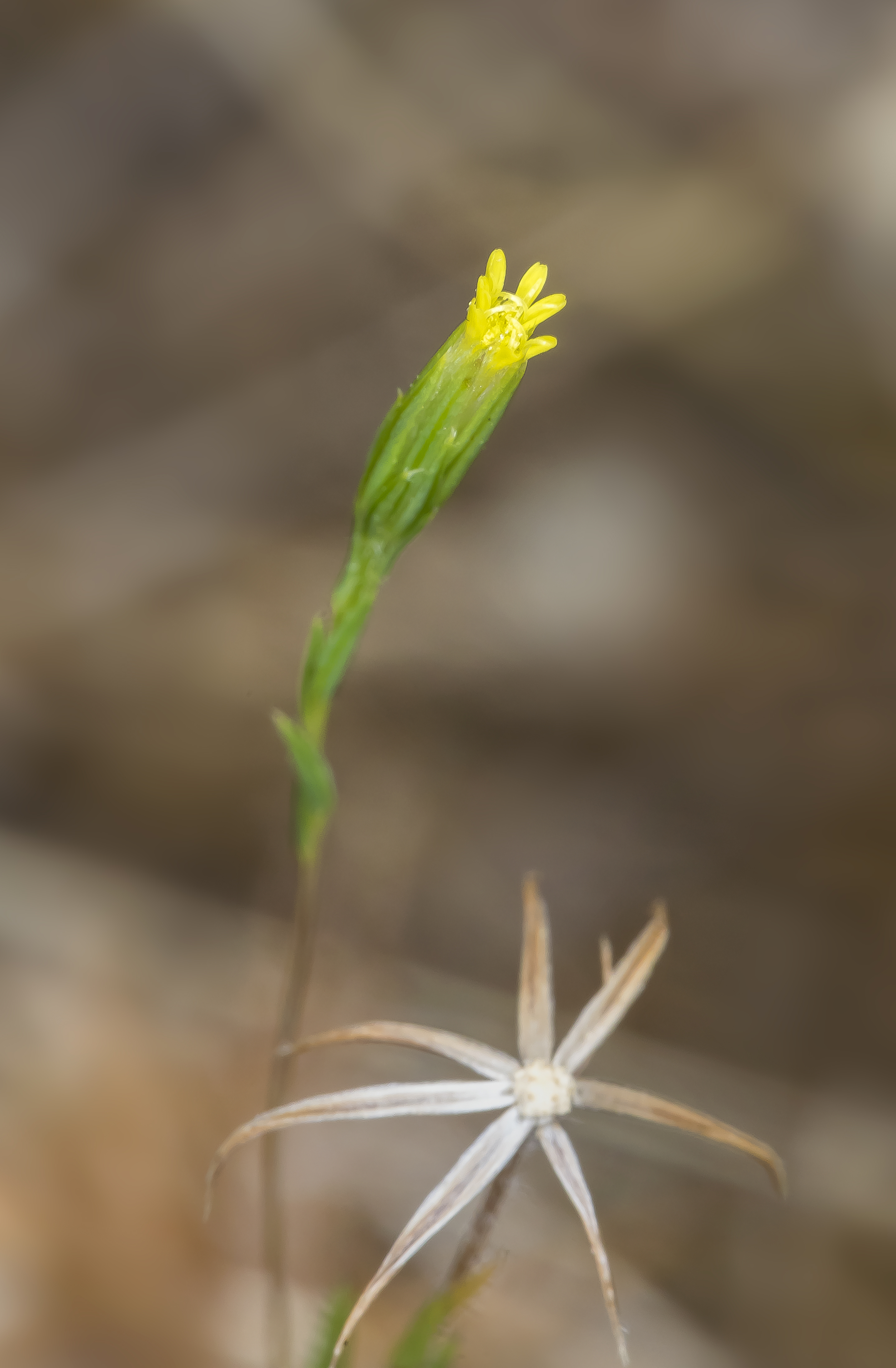

Scientific classification
- Kingdom: Plantae
- Clade: Embryophytes
- Clade: Tracheophytes
- Clade: Angiosperms
- Clade: Eudicots
- Clade: Asterids
- Order: Asterales
- Family: Asteraceae
- Subfamily: Asteroideae
- Tribe: Astereae
- Subtribe: Pentachaetinae
- Genus: Tracyina; S.F.Blake
- Species: T. rostrata

Binomial name
- Tracyina rostrata S.F.Blake

= Tracyina =

Genus of Californian plants

Tracyina is a genus of Californian plants in the tribe Astereae within the family Asteraceae. The genus is named for Calilfornia botanist Joseph Prince Tracy, 1879–1953.

== Species ==
The only known species is Tracyina rostrata, which is known by the common names Indian headdress and beaked tracyina. It is endemic to California, where it is known only from the grassy slopes of the North Coast Ranges north of the San Francisco Bay Area (Humboldt, Trinity, Mendocino, Lake, Alameda, and Sonoma Counties).
