= Nannoglottis =

Scientific classification
- Kingdom: Plantae
- Clade: Tracheophytes
- Clade: Angiosperms
- Clade: Eudicots
- Clade: Asterids
- Order: Asterales
- Family: Asteraceae
- Subfamily: Asteroideae
- Tribe: Astereae
- Subtribe: Nannoglottidinae; G.L.Nesom
- Genus: Nannoglottis; Maxim.

Type species
- Nannoglottis carpesioides Maxim.

Synonyms
- Stereosanthus Franch.; Vierhapperia Hand.-Mazz.

Genus of flowering plants

Nannoglottis is a genus of Asian flowering plants in the family Asteraceae.

Species

- Nannoglottis carpesioides Maxim. - Gansu, Shaanxi, Sichuan, Qinghai
- Nannoglottis delavayi (Franch.) Y.Ling & Y.L.Chen - Sichuan, Yunnan
- Nannoglottis gynura (C.Winkl.) Y.Ling & Y.L.Chen - Qinghai, Sichuan, Tibet, Yunnan, Nepal
- Nannoglottis hieraciphylla (Hand.-Mazz.) Y.Ling & Y.L.Chen - Yunnan
- Nannoglottis hookeri (Clarke ex Hook.f.) Kitam. - Sikkim, Nepal, Bhutan, Assam
- Nannoglottis latisquama Y.Ling & Y.L.Chen - Vietnam, Sichuan, Yunnan
- Nannoglottis macrocarpa Y.Ling & Y.L.Chen - Tibet
- Nannoglottis qinghaiensis Ling & Y.L.Chen - Qinghai
- Nannoglottis ravida (C.Winkl.) Y.L.Chen - Qinghai, Tibet
- Nannoglottis souliei (Franch.) Y.Ling & Y.L.Chen - Nepal, Tibet
- Nannoglottis yuennanensis (Hand.-Mazz.) Hand.-Mazz. - Yunnan
