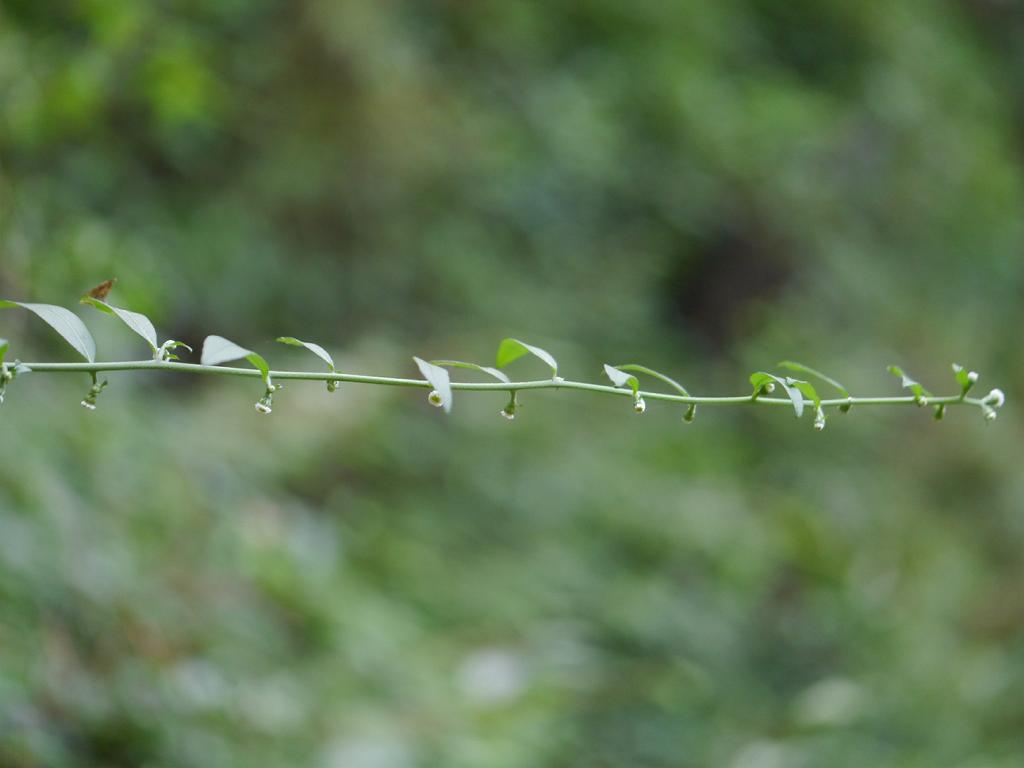

Scientific classification
- Kingdom: Plantae
- Clade: Embryophytes
- Clade: Tracheophytes
- Clade: Spermatophytes
- Clade: Angiosperms
- Clade: Eudicots
- Clade: Asterids
- Order: Asterales
- Family: Asteraceae
- Subfamily: Asteroideae
- Tribe: Astereae
- Subtribe: Asterinae
- Genus: Rhynchospermum; Reinw. 1825 not Lindl. 1846 (Apocynaceae)
- Species: R. verticillatum

Binomial name
- Rhynchospermum verticillatum Reinw.

Synonyms
- Aster verticillatus (Reinw.) Brouillet, Semple & Y.L. Chen; Leptocoma racemosa Less.; Rhynchospermum formosanum Yamam.; Rhynchospermum verticillatum var. subsessilis Oliv. ex Miq.; Zollingeria scandens Sch. Bip.; Lavenia rigida Wallich; Carpesium scandens Schult.f. ex Miq.

= Rhynchospermum =

Genus of plants

Rhynchospermum is a genus of flowering plants within the tribe Astereae within the family Asteraceae.

Species

The only accepted species is Rhynchospermum verticillatum, native to China, Japan, the Indian subcontinent, and Southeast Asia (Myanmar, Thailand, Vietnam, Malaysia, Maluku)
