= Geissolepis =

Scientific classification
- Kingdom: Plantae
- Clade: Tracheophytes
- Clade: Angiosperms
- Clade: Eudicots
- Clade: Asterids
- Order: Asterales
- Family: Asteraceae
- Subfamily: Asteroideae
- Tribe: Astereae
- Subtribe: Geissolepinae; G.L.Nesom
- Genus: Geissolepis; B.L.Rob.
- Species: G. suaedifolia

Binomial name
- Geissolepis suaedifolia B.L.Rob.

Synonyms
- Geissolepis suaedaefolia B.L.Rob., spelling variant

Genus of flowering plants

Geissolepis is a genus of flowering plants in the family Asteraceae.

Species

There is only one known species, Geissolepis suaedifolia, endemic to the State of San Luis Potosí in northeastern Mexico.
