= Sheareria =

Scientific classification
- Kingdom: Plantae
- Clade: Tracheophytes
- Clade: Angiosperms
- Clade: Eudicots
- Clade: Asterids
- Order: Asterales
- Family: Asteraceae
- Subfamily: Asteroideae
- Tribe: Astereae
- Subtribe: Asterinae
- Genus: Sheareria; S.Moore
- Species: S. nana

Binomial name
- Sheareria nana S.Moore

Synonyms
- Sheareria polii Franch.; Sheareria leshanensis Z.Y. Zhu

Genus of plants

Sheareria is a genus of Chinese plants in the tribe Astereae within the family Asteraceae.

Species

The only known species is Sheareria nana, native to China (Provinces of Anhui, Guangdong, Guizhou, Hubei, Hunan, Jiangsu, Jiangxi, Shaanxi, Sichuan, Yunnan, Zhejiang).
