= Columbiadoria =

Columbia River daisy

Scientific classification
- Kingdom: Plantae
- Clade: Tracheophytes
- Clade: Angiosperms
- Clade: Eudicots
- Clade: Asterids
- Order: Asterales
- Family: Asteraceae
- Subfamily: Asteroideae
- Tribe: Astereae
- Subtribe: Solidagininae
- Genus: Columbiadoria; G.L.Nesom
- Species: C. hallii

Binomial name
- Columbiadoria hallii (A.Gray) G.L.Nesom

Synonyms
- Haplopappus hallii A.Gray; Hesperodoria hallii (A.Gray) Greene; Pyrrocoma hallii (A.Gray) Howell; Hoorebekia hallii (A.Gray) Piper; Aster howellii Kuntze

Genus of flowering plants

Columbiadoria is a small North American genus of flowering plants in the family Asteraceae.

The only known species is Columbiadoria hallii, native to the northwestern United States (States of Washington and Oregon). The species is a subshrub up to 60 cm (2 feet) tall. One plant produces numerous yellow flower heads with both ray florets and disc florets.
