= Formania =

Scientific classification
- Kingdom: Plantae
- Clade: Tracheophytes
- Clade: Angiosperms
- Clade: Eudicots
- Clade: Asterids
- Order: Asterales
- Family: Asteraceae
- Subfamily: Asteroideae
- Tribe: Astereae
- Subtribe: Formaniinae; G.L.Nesom
- Genus: Formania; W.W.Sm. & J.Small
- Species: F. mekongensis

Binomial name
- Formania mekongensis W.W.Sm. & J.Small

Genus of flowering plants

Formania is a genus of Chinese flowering plants in the family Asteraceae.

There is only one known species, Formania mekongensis, native to Yunnan and Sichuan in southwestern China.

The genus is named for Rev. Adam Forman, Scottish pastor and provider of medical supplies during the First World War.
