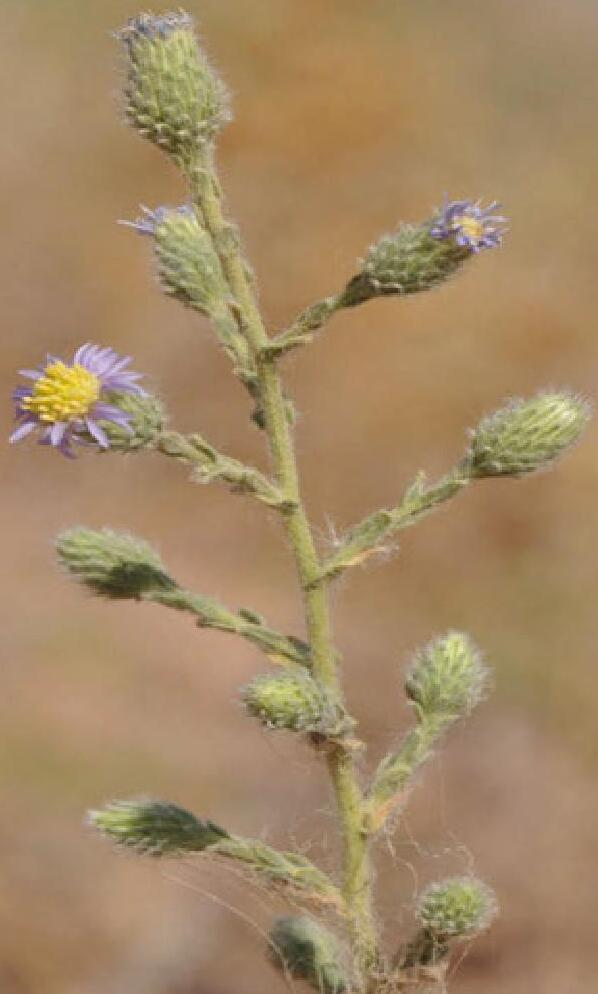
- Lachnophyllum gossypinum

Scientific classification
- Kingdom: Plantae
- Clade: Embryophytes
- Clade: Tracheophytes
- Clade: Angiosperms
- Clade: Eudicots
- Clade: Asterids
- Order: Asterales
- Family: Asteraceae
- Subfamily: Asteroideae
- Tribe: Astereae
- Subtribe: Chamaegerinae
- Genus: Lachnophyllum; Bunge

= Lachnophyllum =

Genus of flowering plants

Lachnophyllum is a genus of Asian flowering plants in the family Asteraceae.

Species

- Lachnophyllum gossypinum Bunge - Iran, Afghanistan, Turkmenistan, Uzbekistan, Kazakhstan, Kyrgyzstan, Tajikistan
- Lachnophyllum noeanum Boiss. - Turkey, Iran, Palestine
