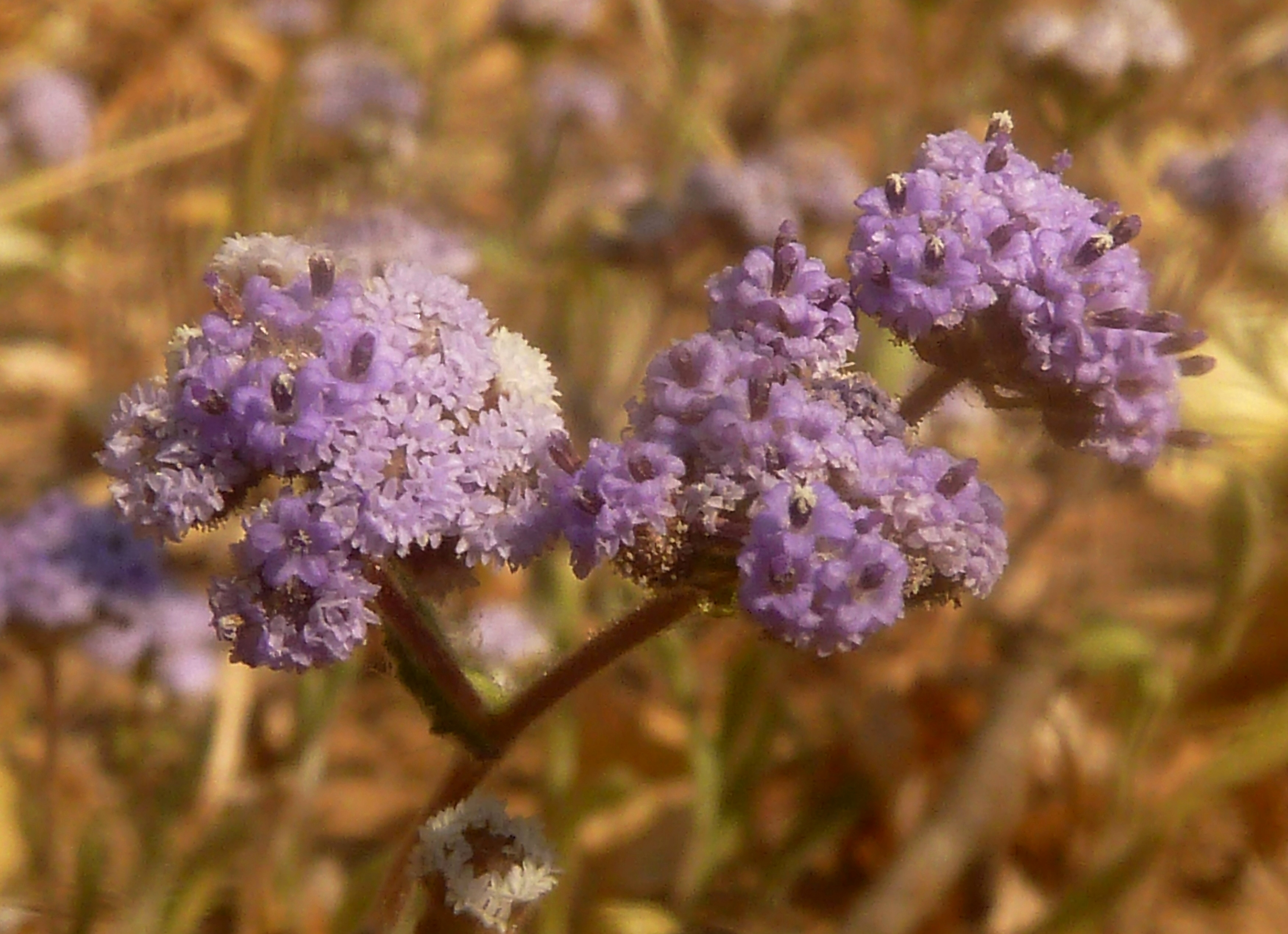

Scientific classification
- Kingdom: Plantae
- Clade: Tracheophytes
- Clade: Angiosperms
- Clade: Eudicots
- Clade: Asterids
- Order: Asterales
- Family: Asteraceae
- Subfamily: Asteroideae
- Tribe: Astereae
- Subtribe: Denekiinae; G.L.Nesom
- Genus: Denekia; Thunb. 1801
- Species: D. capensis

Binomial name
- Denekia capensis Thunb.

Synonyms
- Denekia Thunb. 1800, name published without description, with description in 1801 publication; Denekia capensis var. latifolia DC.; Denekia glabrata DC.; Amphidoxa glandulosa Klatt; Denekia capensis var. minor DC.

= Denekia =

Genus of flowering plants

Denekia is a genus of flowering plants in the family Asteraceae.

There is only one known species, Denekia capensis, native to southern and tropical Africa (South Africa, Lesotho, Eswatini, Namibia, Botswana, Zimbabwe, Mozambique, Angola, Malawi, Tanzania).
