= Brintonia =

Scientific classification
- Kingdom: Plantae
- Clade: Tracheophytes
- Clade: Angiosperms
- Clade: Eudicots
- Clade: Asterids
- Order: Asterales
- Family: Asteraceae
- Subfamily: Asteroideae
- Tribe: Astereae
- Genus: Brintonia; Greene
- Species: B. discoidea

Binomial name
- Brintonia discoidea (Elliott) Greene

Synonyms
- Solidago discoidea (Elliott) Torr. & A.Gray; Aster discoideus Elliott

Genus of flowering plants

Brintonia is a monotypic genus of flowering plants in the sunflower family, containing the single species Brintonia discoidea, named for Jeremiah Bernard Brinton. It is known commonly as the rayless mock goldenrod. It is native to the southeastern United States, where it is distributed in Alabama, Florida, Georgia, Louisiana, and Mississippi.

Brintonia discoidea is a perennial herb growing up to 1.5 meters tall from a thick rhizome. The erect, unbranched stem is lightly hairy. The alternately arranged leaves have rough-haired serrated blades up to 10 centimeters long on winged petioles. The inflorescence is a wide array of several flower heads. Each head contains up to 20 disc florets with bright green tubes and whitish or pinkish corollas and pinkish anthers. The fruit is a ribbed cypsela with a pappus of many white or purple-tipped bristles.

The plant occurs on the Gulf Coastal Plain in sandy, swampy habitat.

It is sometimes still treated as a species of Solidago, but DNA evidence and several aspects of its morphology support its separation from that genus.
