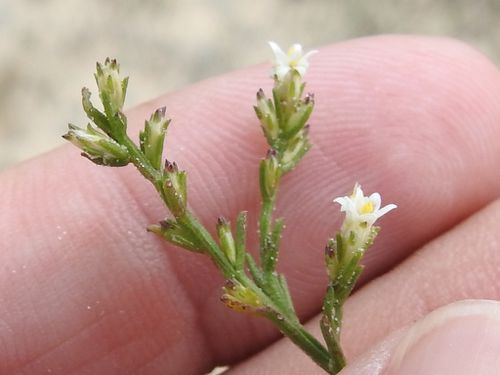

Scientific classification
- Kingdom: Plantae
- Clade: Tracheophytes
- Clade: Angiosperms
- Clade: Eudicots
- Clade: Asterids
- Order: Asterales
- Family: Asteraceae
- Subfamily: Asteroideae
- Tribe: Astereae
- Subtribe: Gutiereziinae
- Genus: Thurovia; Rose
- Species: T. triflora

Binomial name
- Thurovia triflora Rose

Synonyms
- Gutierrez triflora (Rose) M.A.Lane

= Thurovia =

Genus of plants

Thurovia is a genus of Texan plants in the tribe Astereae within the family Asteraceae.

Molecular analysis has since confirmed the uniqueness of Thurovia.

Species

The only known species is Thurovia triflora, commonly known as the threeflower snakeweed or the three-flower broomweed. It is native to the coastal plain of east-central and southeastern Texas.
