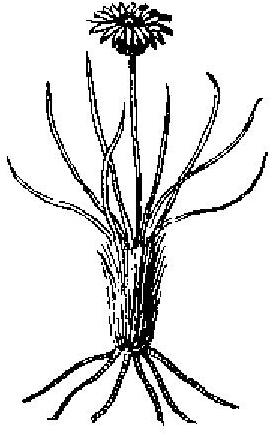

Scientific classification
- Kingdom: Plantae
- Clade: Tracheophytes
- Clade: Angiosperms
- Clade: Eudicots
- Clade: Asterids
- Order: Asterales
- Family: Asteraceae
- Subfamily: Asteroideae
- Tribe: Astereae
- Subtribe: Brachyscominae
- Genus: Achnophora; F.Muell.
- Species: A. tatei

Binomial name
- Achnophora tatei F.Muell.

= Achnophora =

Genus of flowering plants

Achnophora is a genus of flowering plants in the family Asteraceae described as a genus in 1883.

The only known species is Achnophora tatei. This is a rare endemic found only on Kangaroo Island in South Australia.

== Description ==
=== Morphology ===
==== Roots ====
The rhizome of A. tatei is described as thick, hairless and vertical with bundles of short thick rootlets attached.

==== Leaves ====
Achnophora tatei leaves are in a rosette form at the base of the plant, with a long narrow leaf shape (linear) and sheath at the base of the leaf.

==== Flowers ====
Achnophora tatei flowers take the form of a scape (single flowering stem arising from the rhizome). The flower stems are red, thread-like, almost naked and about as long as the leaves. Flowers are one-headed, have a rosette of bracts (small leaf like structures) surrounding the flower (involucre) which are close to hemispheric (i.e. half of a sphere).

The bracts of the flower are generally arranged in three rows of unequal length, with similar grades of size, and range in shape with the bract being egg-shaped with broader end at base (ovate) to the bract being egg-shaped with the narrow end at base (obovate). The bracts are 4 to 5 millimetres long and have dry and membranous margins.

The receptacle or floral axis has conspicuous oblong (having a length greater than width) scales between the flowers.

The ray-flowers are female in 1 row, with about 25 ligules which are narrow, blue and are an estimated 10 millimetres long.

Disc-flowers are tubular, with the style-branches being slender (capillary).

Anthers (pollen bearing structure which is part of the stamen) are blunt and rounded (obtuse) at the base.

== Taxonomy ==
=== Etymology ===
Achnophora tatei is commonly known as the Kangaroo Island daisy.

The genus name Achnophora is derived from the Greek word 'achne' which means chaff and 'phoros' meaning bearing. This refers to the clearly visible scales of the receptacle and pappus. Tatei is named after Ralph Tate (1840-1901), a British born botanist and geologist, who was a professor of Natural Science at the University of Adelaide.

== Distribution and habitat ==
Achnophora tatei is found along the south coast of Kangaroo Island, South Australia. The species is found in wet, swampy places.

== Conservation ==
Achnophora tatei has been classified as a vulnerable species by the South Australian Government due to a restricted distribution and the impacts of increasing salinity.
