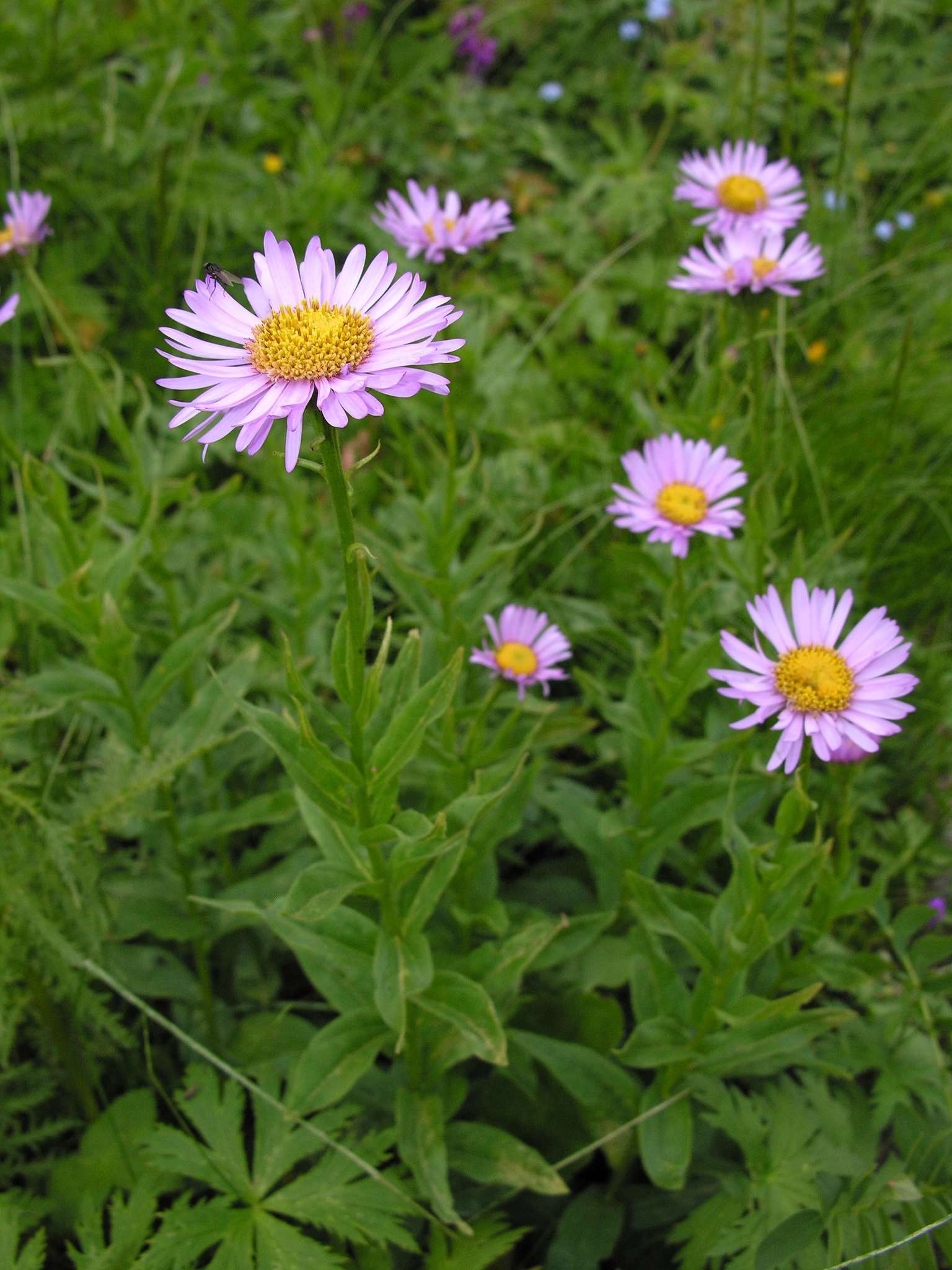
- Kemulariella caucasica in Karachay-Cherkessia, Russia

Scientific classification
- Kingdom: Plantae
- Clade: Tracheophytes
- Clade: Angiosperms
- Clade: Eudicots
- Clade: Asterids
- Order: Asterales
- Family: Asteraceae
- Subfamily: Asteroideae
- Tribe: Astereae
- Subtribe: Asterinae
- Genus: Kemulariella; Tamamsch.

= Kemulariella =

Genus of flowering plants

Kemulariella is a genus of flowering plants in the family Asteraceae.

Species

- Kemulariella abchasica (Kem.-Nath.) Tamamsch. - Republic of Georgia
- Kemulariella caucasica (Willd.) Tamansch. - Republic of Georgia, North Caucasus
- Kemulariella colchica (Albov) Tamamsch. - Republic of Georgia, Asiatic Turkey
- Kemulariella rosea (Steven) Tamamsch. - Azerbaijan, Daghestan
- Kemulariella tuganiana (Albov) Tamamsch. - Republic of Georgia
