= Ceruana =

Scientific classification
- Kingdom: Plantae
- Clade: Embryophytes
- Clade: Tracheophytes
- Clade: Angiosperms
- Clade: Eudicots
- Clade: Asterids
- Order: Asterales
- Family: Asteraceae
- Subfamily: Asteroideae
- Tribe: Astereae
- Subtribe: Grangeinae
- Genus: Ceruana; Forssk.
- Species: C. pratensis

Binomial name
- Ceruana pratensis Forssk.

Synonyms
- Ceruana fruticosa Less.; [Buphthalmum pratense Vahl; Ceruana rotundifolia Cass.; Ceruana senegalensis DC.

Species of plant

Ceruana is a genus of flowering plants in the family Asteraceae.

There is only one known species, Ceruana pratensis, native to the Sahara and Sahel regions of Africa, from Egypt to Ethiopia to Senegal.
