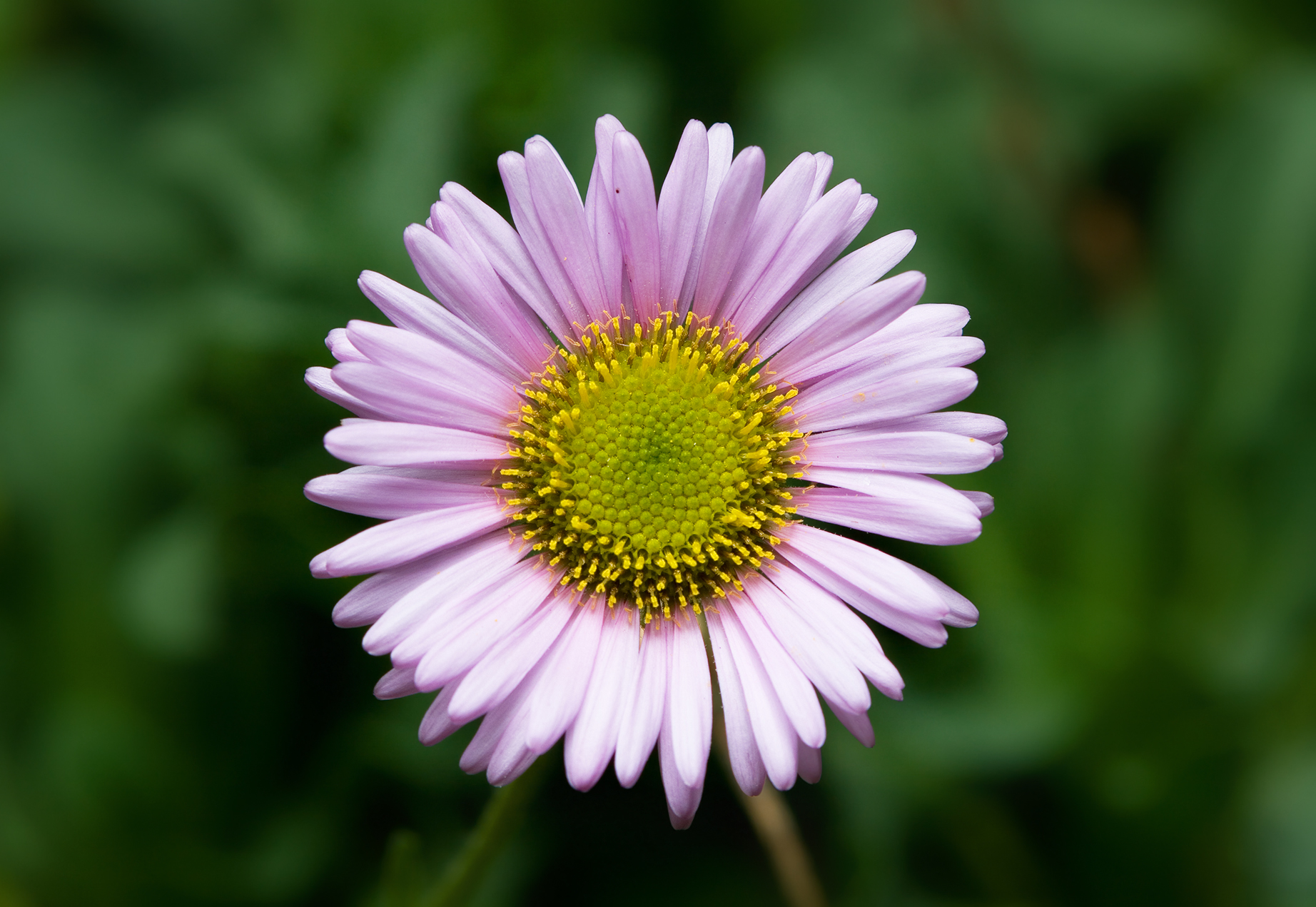

Scientific classification
- Kingdom: Plantae
- Clade: Tracheophytes
- Clade: Angiosperms
- Clade: Eudicots
- Clade: Asterids
- Order: Asterales
- Family: Asteraceae
- Genus: Erigeron
- Species: E. glaucus

Binomial name
- Erigeron glaucus Ker Gawl.

Synonyms
- Synonymy: Aster bonariensis Spreng.; Aster californicus Less.; Aster glaucus (Ker Gawl.) Pépin 1832 not Nees 1818; Erigeron hispidus Nutt.; Erigeron maritimus Nutt.; Erigeron squarrosus Lindl.; Stenactis glauca (Ker Gawl.) Nees

= Erigeron glaucus =

Species of flowering plant

Erigeron glaucus is a species of flowering plant in the family Asteraceae known by the common name seaside fleabane, beach aster, or seaside daisy. It is native to the West Coast of the United States.

== Description ==
E. glaucus is a perennial daisy reaching heights between 5 and 40 centimetres (2 and 15 1/2 inches) with branching, nodding stems which may be glandular and hairy to hairless. It grows from a stout rhizome and produces thick, firm, rounded to spoon-shaped leaves, sometimes with a few teeth along the edges, each 2–13 cm (3/4–5 in) long. From April to August, its stems bear inflorescences of 1–15 flower heads which vary in size from about 1 to 6.5 cm (1/2 to 2 1/2 in) wide. The centers contain golden yellow disc florets and the edges are fringed with about 100 ray florets which may be long or quite short, and are shades of deep blue and purple to nearly white. The fruit is seed-like with many bristles at the tip.

Unusual for its genus (but not for plants near the coast), the plant is somewhat succulent.

== Distribution and habitat ==
The wildflower is native to the coastline of Oregon and California where it grows on beaches, coastal bluffs and dunes. While typical habitats include coastal bluffs, one highly specialised plant association is found within the two Cupressus macrocarpa dominant forests in Monterey County, California.

== Ecology ==
E. glaucus occurs in several different plant associations. One of the specialized habitats is within the Monterey cypress forests of the Central California coast.

== Gallery ==
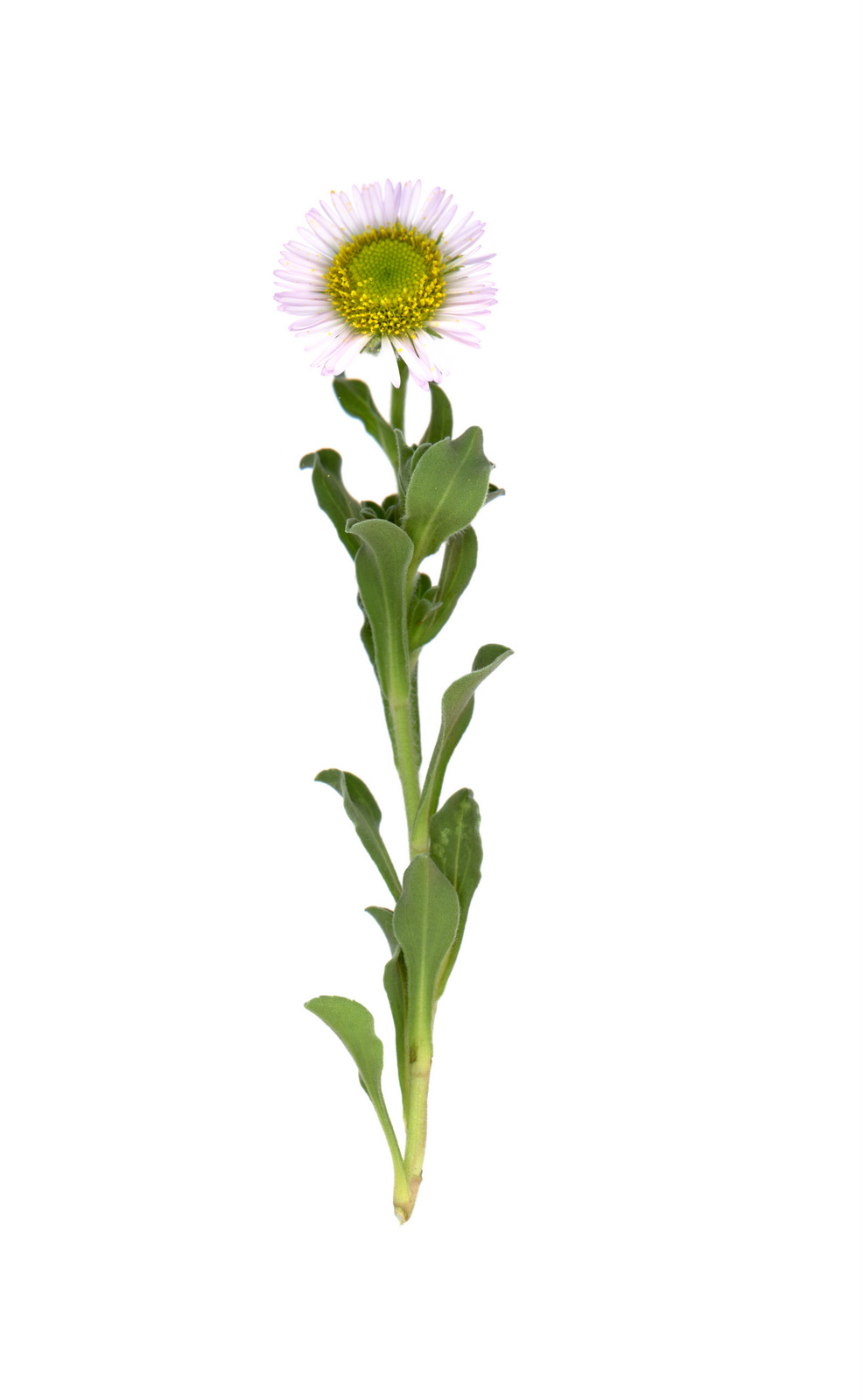
Erigeron glaucus

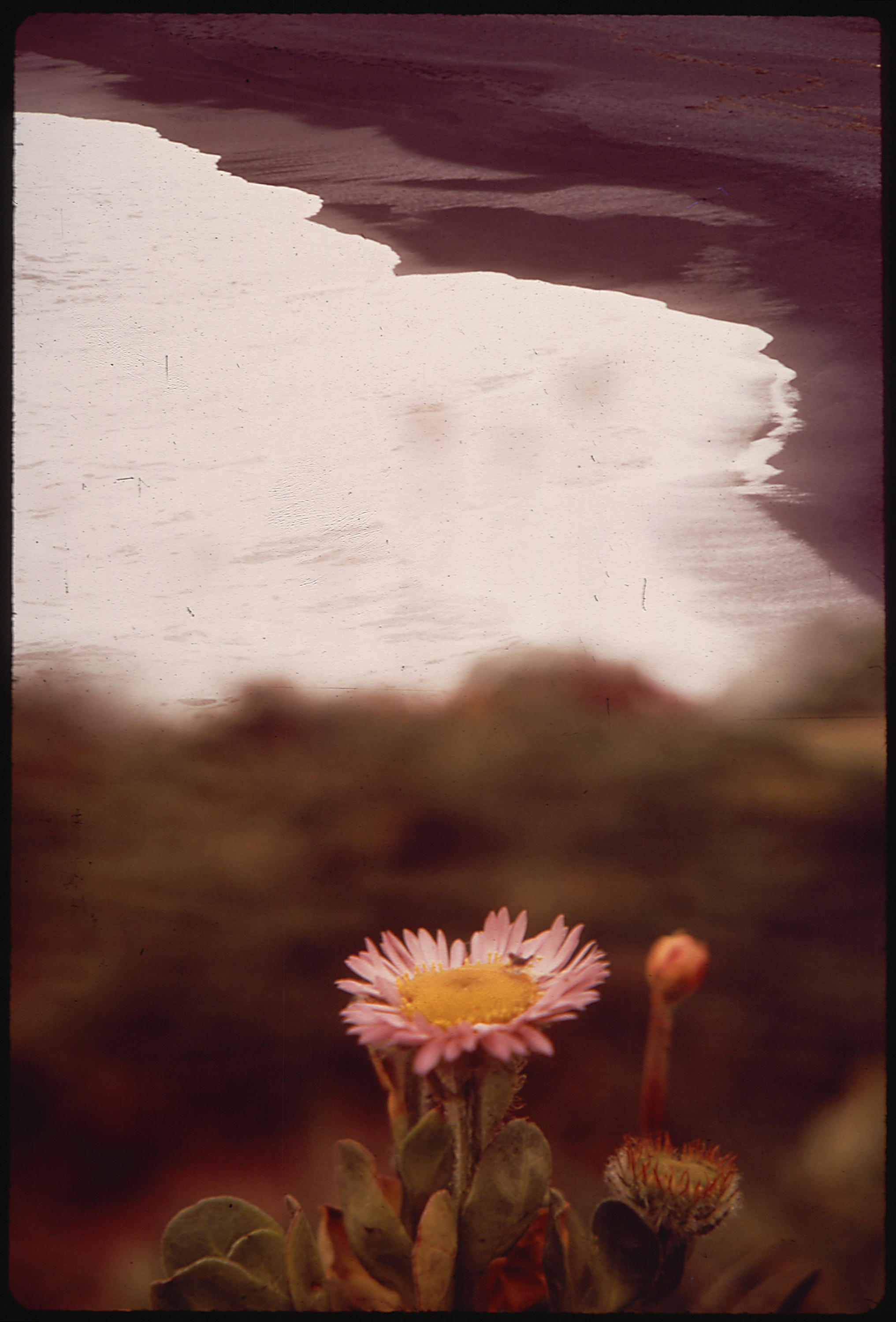
Point Arena, California

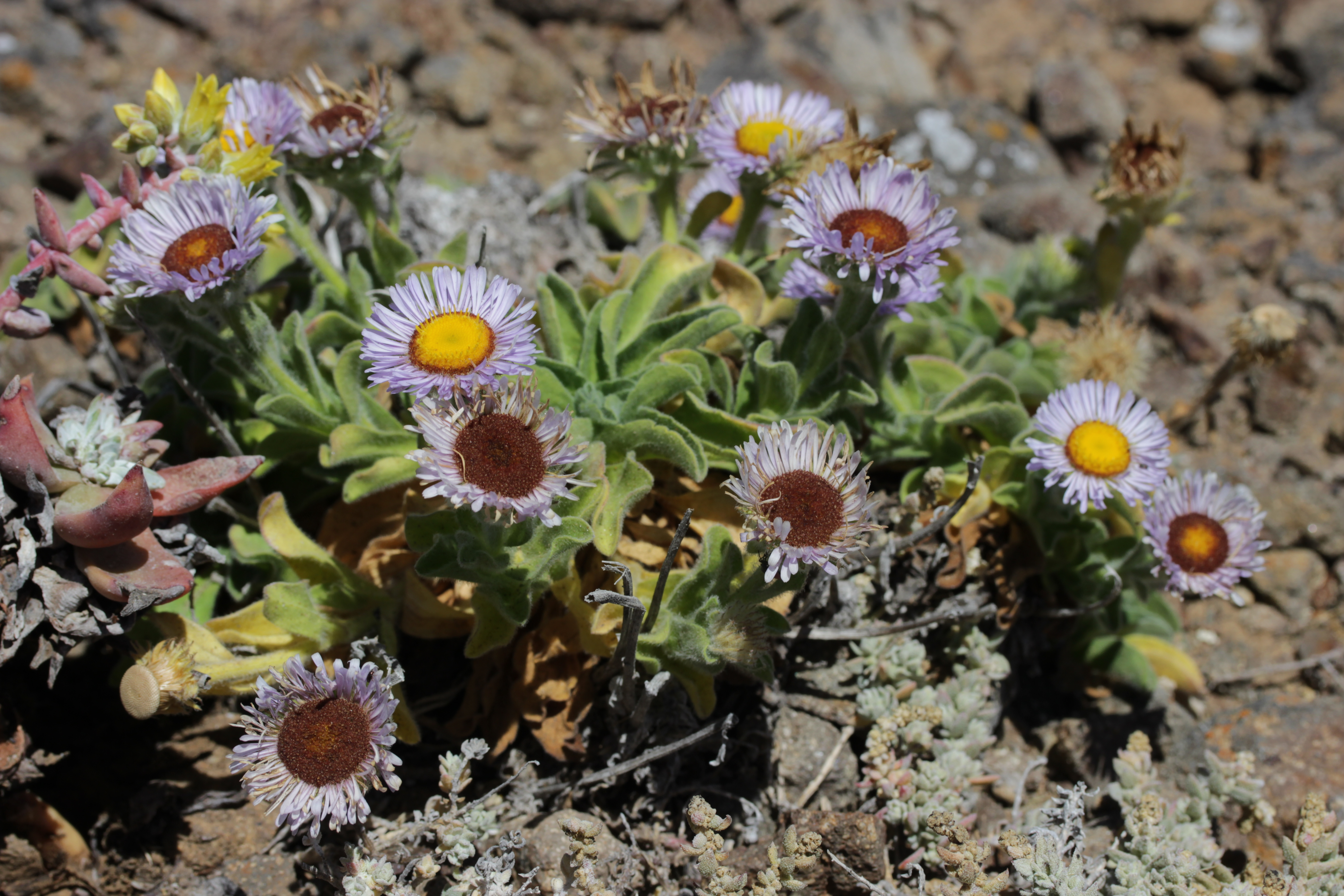
Santa Cruz Island

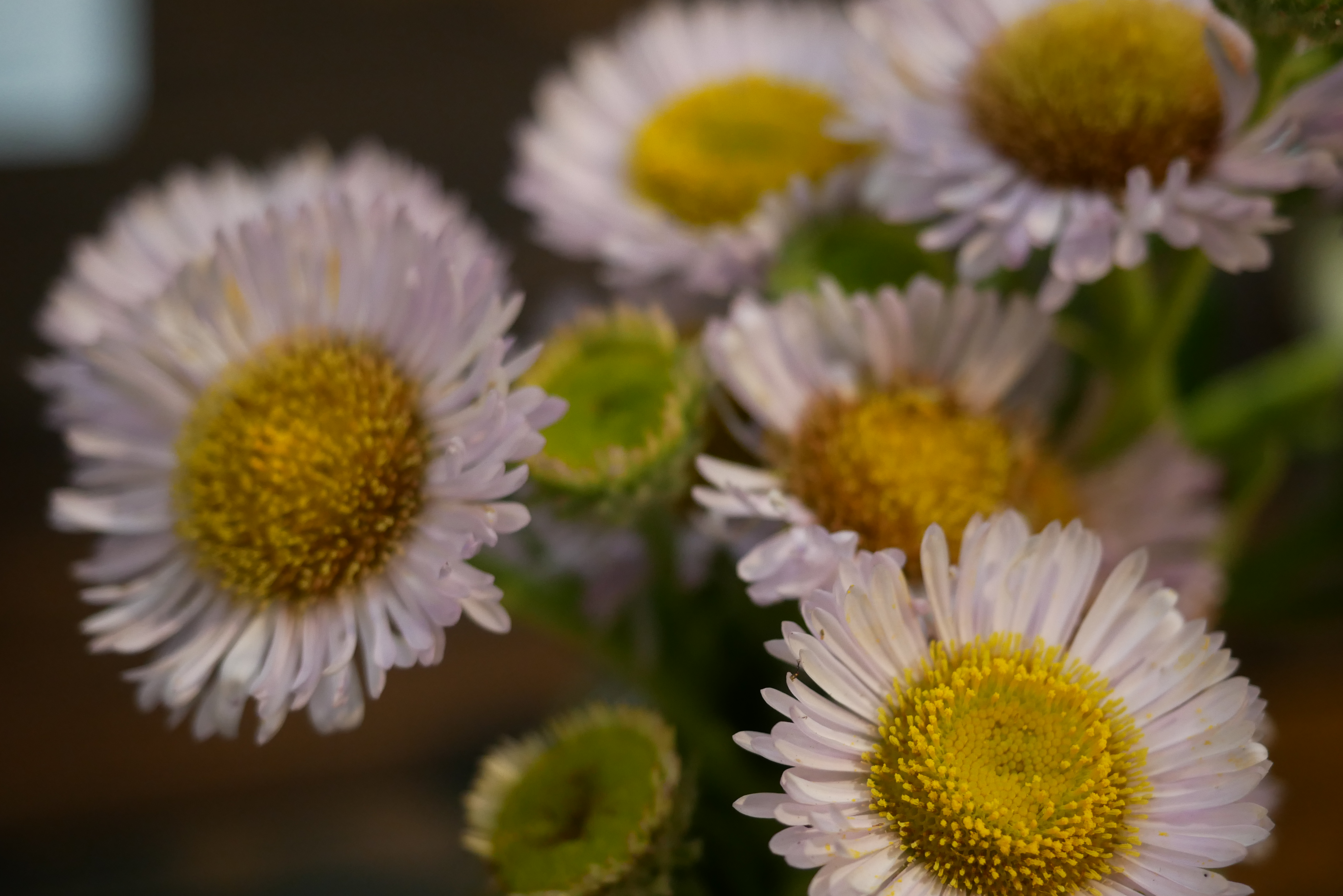
Close-up of flowers

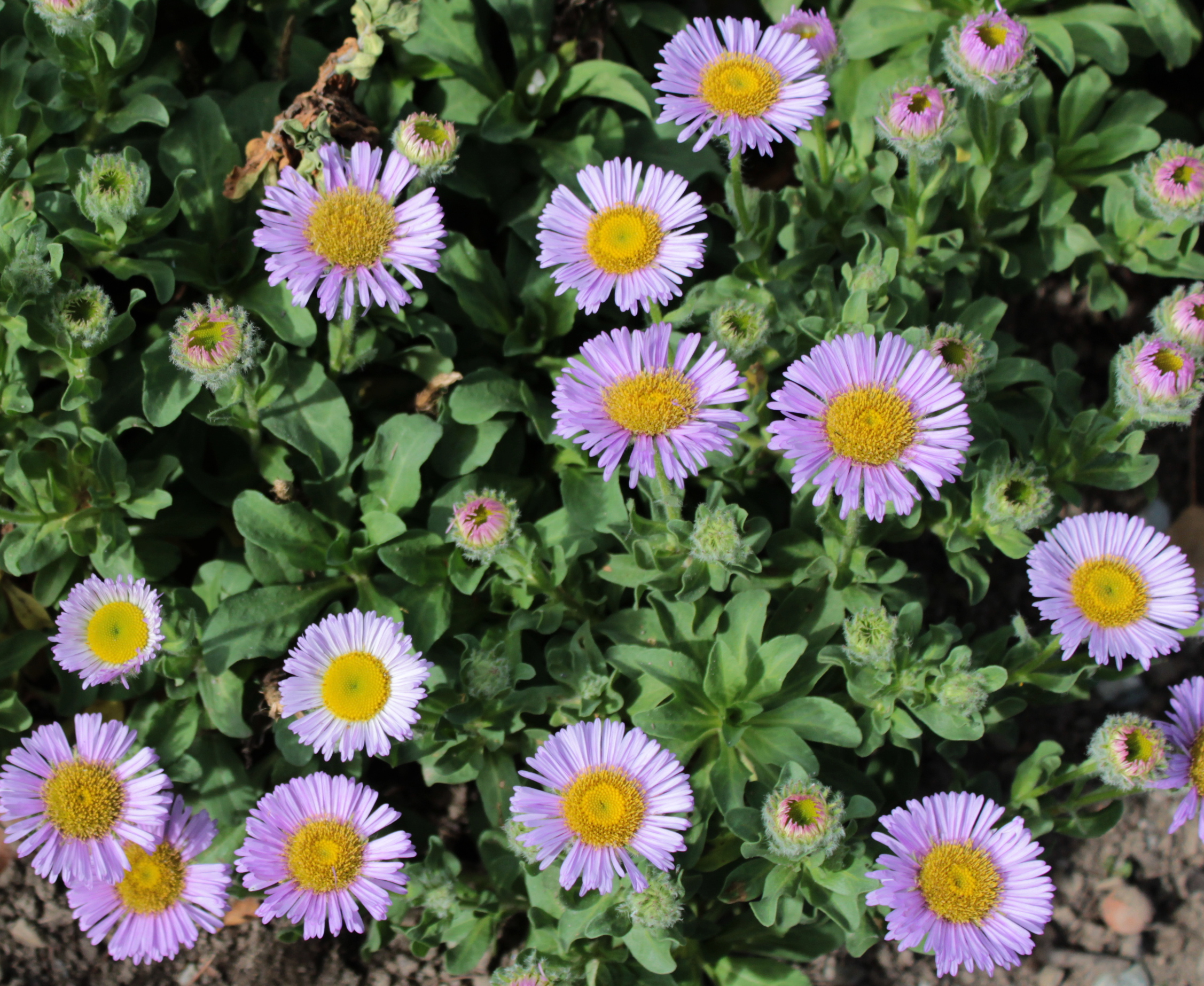
Botanical garden of Fribourg, Switzerland
