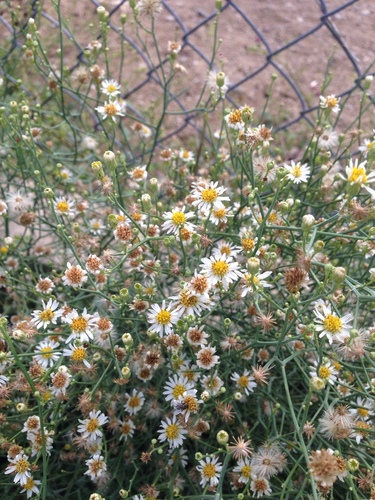

Conservation status
- Apparently Secure (NatureServe)

Scientific classification
- Kingdom: Plantae
- Clade: Tracheophytes
- Clade: Angiosperms
- Clade: Eudicots
- Clade: Asterids
- Order: Asterales
- Family: Asteraceae
- Genus: Chloracantha
- Species: C. spinosa

Binomial name
- Chloracantha spinosa (Benth.) G.L.Nesom

Synonyms
- Erigeron sect. Spinosi (Alexander) G.L.Nesom & Sundberg; Aster sect. Spinosi (Alexander) A.G.Jones; Aster spinosus Benth.; Erigeron ortegae S.F.Blake; Leucosyris spinosa (Benth.) Greene

= Chloracantha =

Chloracantha spinosa

Genus of flowering plants

Chloracantha is a monotypic genus of flowering plants in the aster family, containing the single species Chloracantha spinosa. It is distributed in the southwestern and south-central United States (CA NV AZ UT NM TX OK LA), most of Mexico, and much of Central America. Its English language common names include spiny chloracantha, spiny aster, devilweed aster, and Mexican devilweed. In Spanish it is known as espina de agua, espinaza, and espinosilla.

This species is a perennial herb or subshrub; its green stems look more herbaceous than woody, "but it behaves more like a subshrub", with its tough stems living for several years and rapidly developing vascular cambia. The stems are hairless and sometimes waxy in texture, and some of the lateral branches may be sharply angled and reduced in size, becoming thorns. The alternately arranged leaves persist for only a short time and then fall away. Large colonies of these bare stems proliferate from a robust rhizomes. The stems usually reach a maximum height around 1.5 meters, but can well exceed 2 meters at times. They bear loose arrays of many flower heads each roughly half a centimeter long and wide. The head is lined with layers of hairless phyllaries. It contains up to 33 coiling white ray florets and many yellow disc florets. The fruit is a cypsela with a pappus of many barbed bristles.

This plant is known from dry habitat and moist spots, such as streambanks and seeps. It tolerates some saline habitat types.

varieties

1. Chloracantha spinosa var. spinosa
2. Chloracantha spinosa var. jaliscensis (McVaugh) S.D. Sundb. - Jalisco, Nayarit
3. Chloracantha spinosa var. spinosissima (Brandegee) S.D.Sundb. - Baja California
4. Chloracantha spinosa var. strictospinosa S.D.Sundb. - Chiapas, Michoacán, Costa Rica, El Salvador, Guatemala, Honduras, Nicaragua, Panama
