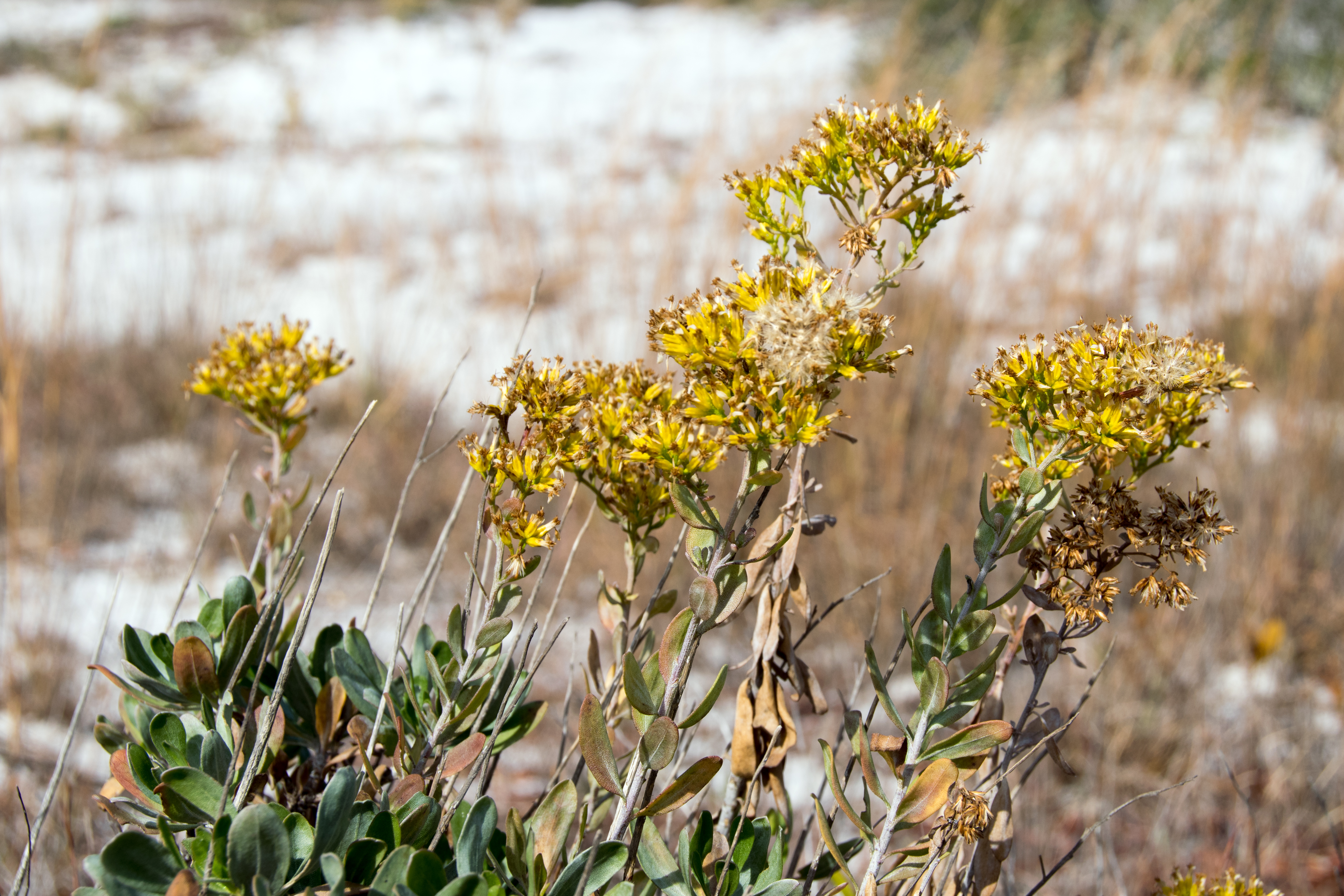
- Chrysoma pauciflosculos in Grayton Beach State Park, Florida

Scientific classification
- Kingdom: Plantae
- Clade: Tracheophytes
- Clade: Angiosperms
- Clade: Eudicots
- Clade: Asterids
- Order: Asterales
- Family: Asteraceae
- Subfamily: Asteroideae
- Tribe: Astereae
- Subtribe: Solidagininae
- Genus: Chrysoma; Nutt.
- Species: C. pauciflosculosa

Binomial name
- Chrysoma pauciflosculosa (Michx.) Greene

Synonyms
- Solidago pauciflosculosa Michx.; Aster pauciflosculosus (Michx.) Kuntze; Aplactis paniculata Raf.; Chrysoma solidaginoides Nutt.

= Chrysoma =

Genus of flowering plants

Chrysoma is a genus of flowering plants in the family Asteraceae.

== Species ==
More than 20 species names have been created in the genus, most of them now transferred to other genera (Ericameria, Solidago, Gundlachia). Only one remains, Chrysoma pauciflosculosa (common name woody goldenrod), native to the southeastern United States (Florida, Georgia, Alabama, Mississippi, South Carolina, North Carolina). Chrysoma pauciflosculosa is a branching, evergreen shrub up to 100 cm (39 in) tall, with resin but no hairs. Flower heads are yellow, in dense, flat-topped arrays of many small heads, sometimes with no ray florets but sometimes with 2 or 3 ray florets, plus 2-5 disc florets.
