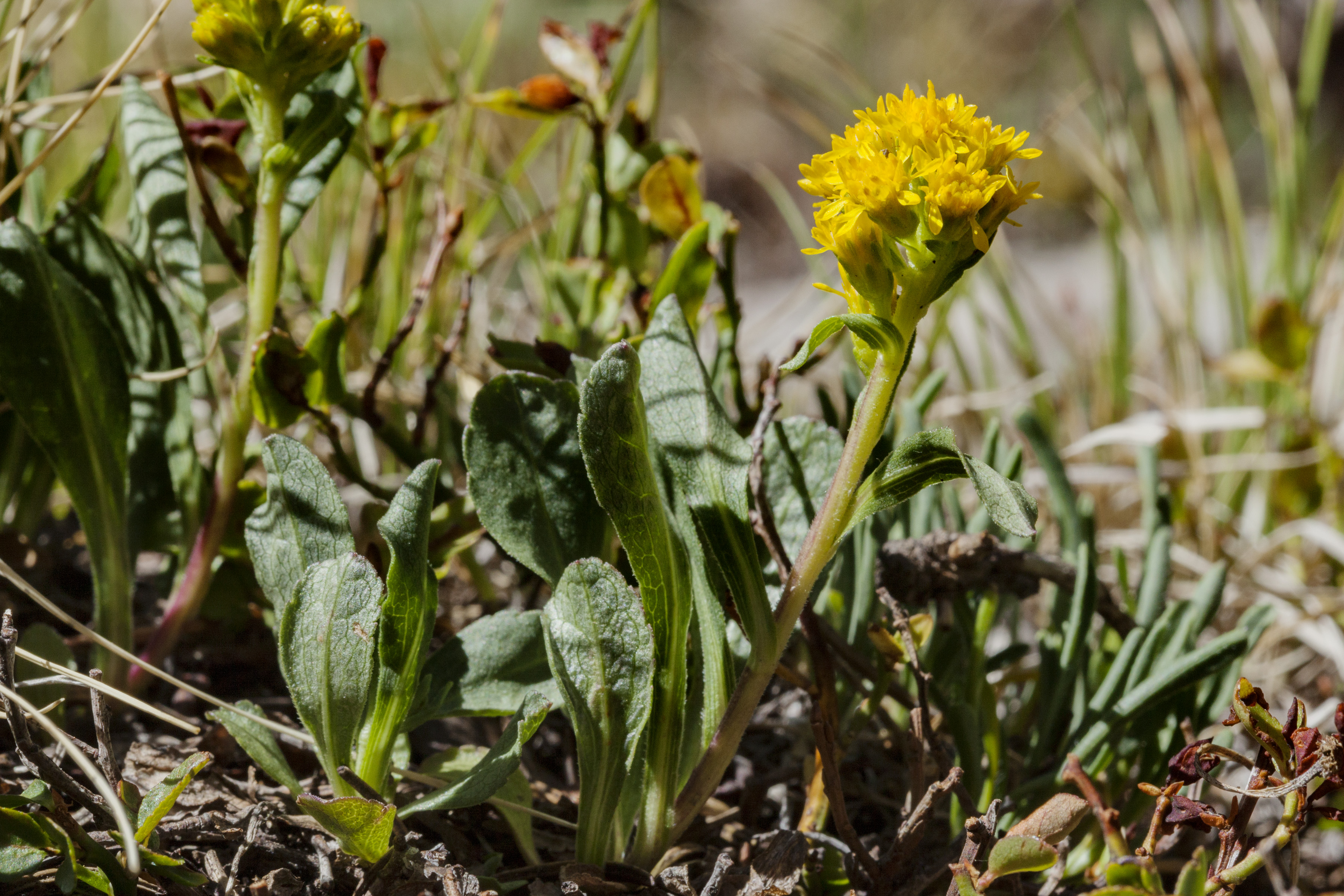
- Oreochrysum parryi in the Sangre de Cristo Mountains

Conservation status
- Apparently Secure (NatureServe)

Scientific classification
- Kingdom: Plantae
- Clade: Tracheophytes
- Clade: Angiosperms
- Clade: Eudicots
- Clade: Asterids
- Order: Asterales
- Family: Asteraceae
- Subfamily: Asteroideae
- Tribe: Astereae
- Subtribe: Solidagininae
- Genus: Oreochrysum; Rydb.
- Species: O. parryi

Binomial name
- Oreochrysum parryi (A.Gray) Rydb.

Synonyms
- Haplopappus sect. Oreochrysum (Rydb.) H.M.Hall; Solidago subg. Oreochrysum (Rydb.) Semple; Haplopappus parryi A.Gray; Solidago parryi (A.Gray) Greene; Aster minor (A.Gray) Kuntze; Solidago parryi var. minor (A.Gray) Greene; Haplopappus parryi var. minor A.Gray

= Oreochrysum =

Genus of flowering plants

Oreochrysum is a genus of flowering plants in the family Asteraceae.

Species

There is only one known species, Oreochrysum parryi, native to western North America (Chihuahua, New Mexico, Arizona, Nevada, Utah, Colorado, Wyoming, South Dakota). Parry's goldenrod is a common name for this species.
