= Dichaetophora campestris =

Scientific classification
- Kingdom: Plantae
- Clade: Tracheophytes
- Clade: Angiosperms
- Clade: Eudicots
- Clade: Asterids
- Order: Asterales
- Family: Asteraceae
- Subfamily: Asteroideae
- Tribe: Astereae
- Subtribe: Astranthiinae
- Genus: Dichaetophora; A.Gray
- Species: D. campestris

Binomial name
- Dichaetophora campestris A.Gray

Synonyms
- Boltonia campestris (A.Gray) Hemsl.

Genus of flowering plants

Dichaetophora is a genus of flowering plants in the family Asteraceae.

There is only one known species, Dichaetophora campestris, native to Chihuahua, Nuevo León, and southern Texas.
