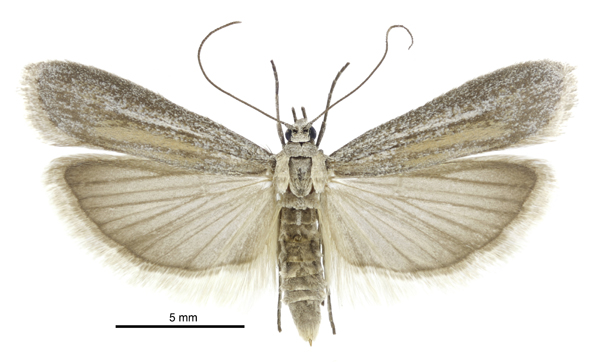
- Female

Scientific classification
- Kingdom: Animalia
- Phylum: Arthropoda
- Clade: Pancrustacea
- Class: Insecta
- Order: Lepidoptera
- Family: Pyralidae
- Genus: Homoeosoma
- Species: H. anaspila

Binomial name
- Homoeosoma anaspila Meyrick, 1901

= Homoeosoma anaspila =

Species of moth

Homoeosoma anaspila is a species of snout moth in the genus Homoeosoma. It is endemic to New Zealand. It found in the North and South Islands as well as the Kermadec Islands.

== Taxonomy ==
This species was first described by Edward Meyrick in 1901 using specimens from Waipukurau collected by Meryrick himself in March and two other specimens collected in Christchurch including one collected by R. W. Fereday. That latter specimen is the designated lectotype and is held at the Natural History Museum, London.

== Description ==
Meyrick described the species as follows:

♀ 16-21 mm. Head, palpi, and thorax fuscous, irrorated with white. Forewings very narrow, posteriorly somewhat dilated; 4 and 5 stalked; white, more or less inorated with fuscous; first line cloudy, fuscous, angulated in middle, but usually quite obsolete : cilia pale fuscous, irrorated with white. Hindwings whitish-fuscous, termen slenderly dark fuscous; cilia whitish, with a faint fuscous subbasal line.

== Distribution ==
The species is endemic to New Zealand. It has been collected in the wider Mackenzie basin, and the Canterbury region, as well as on the Kermadec Islands.

== Biology and behaviour ==
The adults of this moth are on the wing during the months of October to December and also in March.

== Habitat and host species ==
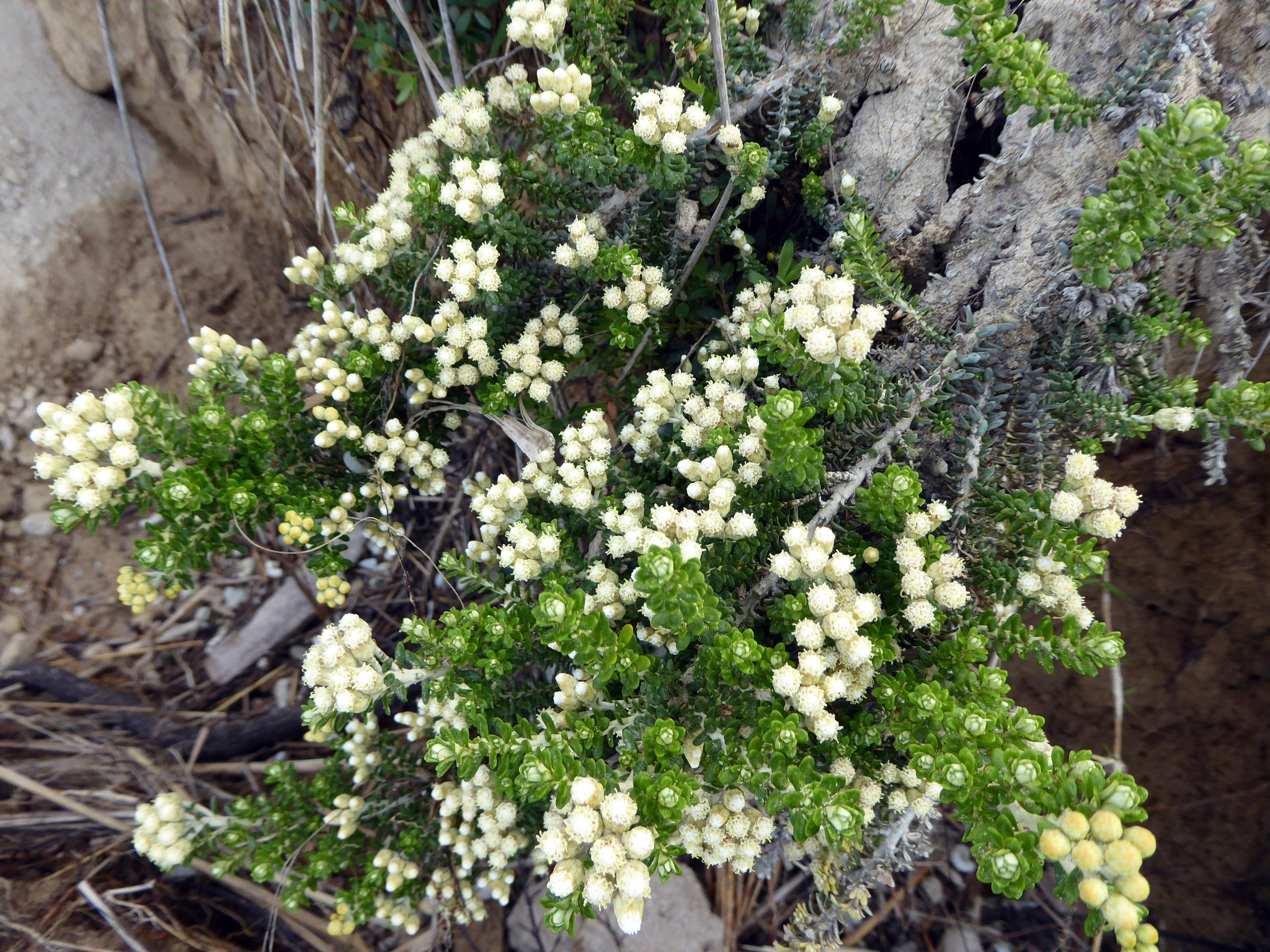
Ozothamnus leptophyllus host for H. anaspila larvae

The larvae feed on Vittandinia species including Vittadinia gracilis and Vittadinia australis as well as Helichrysum luteoalbum, Hieracium lepidulum, Jacobaea vulgaris and Ozothamnus leptophyllus.
