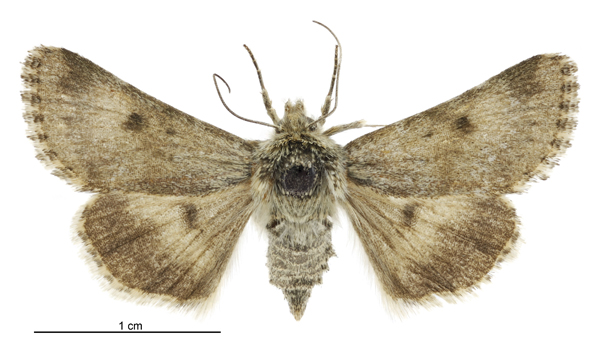
- Female
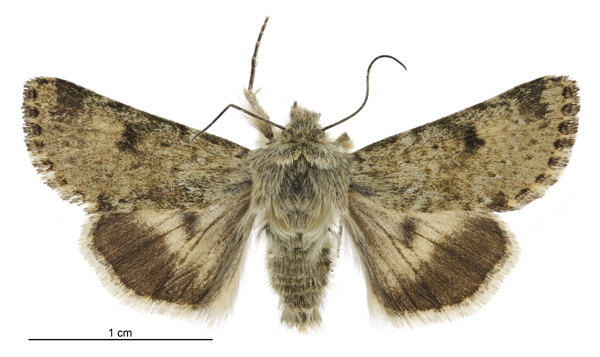
- Male

Conservation status
- Nationally Critical (NZ TCS)

Scientific classification
- Kingdom: Animalia
- Phylum: Arthropoda
- Clade: Pancrustacea
- Class: Insecta
- Order: Lepidoptera
- Superfamily: Noctuoidea
- Family: Noctuidae
- Genus: Australothis
- Species: A. volatilis

Binomial name
- Australothis volatilis Matthews & Patrick, 1998

= Australothis volatilis =

Species of moth

Australothis volatilis, the fuzzweed moth, is a species of moth in the family Noctuidae. It is endemic to New Zealand. This species has been classified as nationally critical under the New Zealand Threat Classification System by the Department of Conservation.

== Taxonomy ==
This species was discovered by Brian H. Patrick in Central Otago in 1989. It was first described by him and his colleague M. Matthews in 1998.

== Distribution ==
A. volatilis is endemic to New Zealand. It has been found in only six sites in Central Otago and the Mackenzie Basin. As at 2025 this species has only recently been observed at a single site.

== Host plants ==
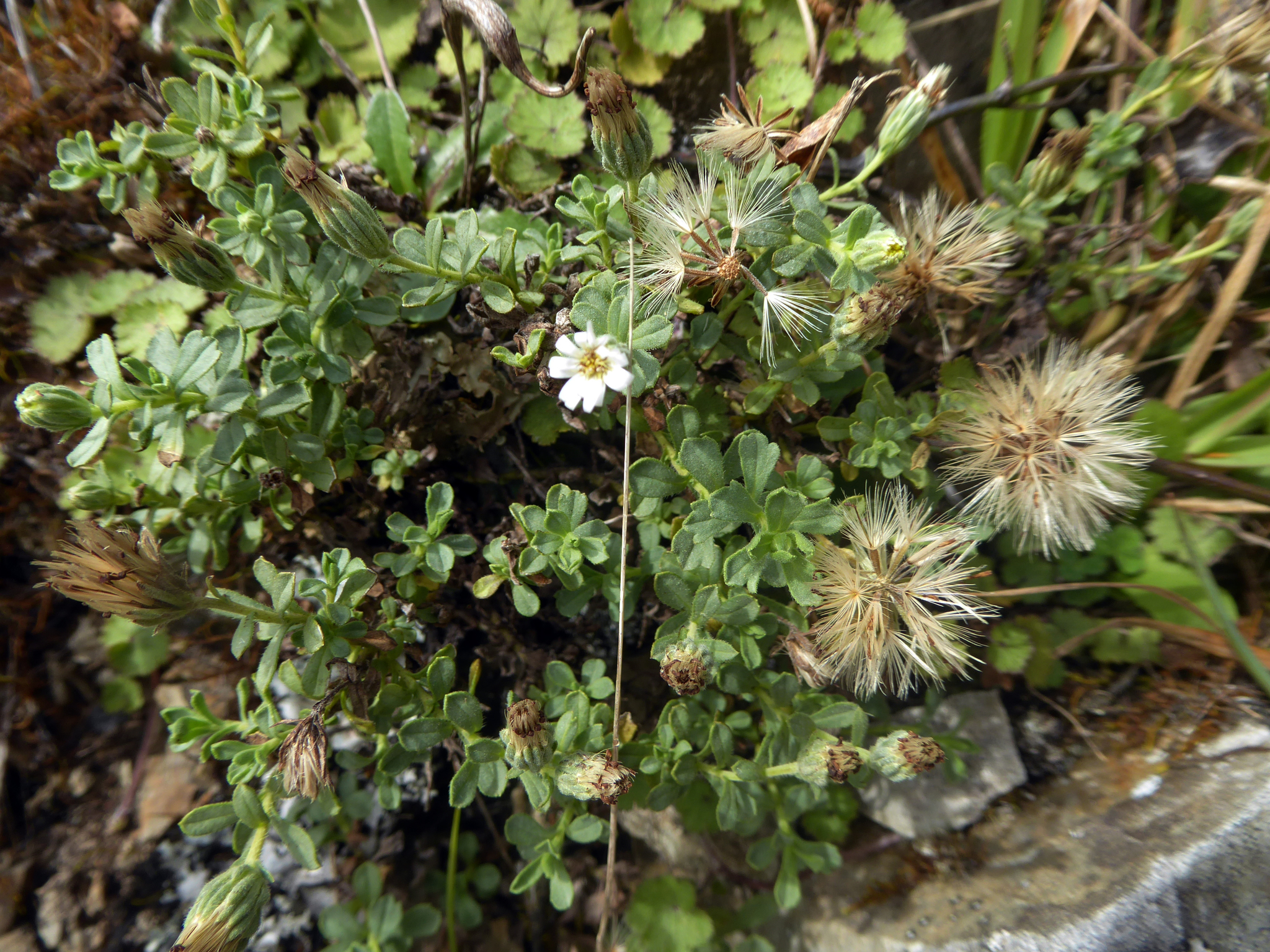
White fuzzweed (Vittadinia australis)

The larvae of this species feed on Vittadinia species. The natural host of A. volatilis appears to be the white fuzzweed herb Vittadinia australis. This plant is also endemic to New Zealand and is itself in need of conservation. The caterpillars of A. volatilis feed on the flower heads, leaves and developing seeds of the plant. Larvae have also been seen feeding on the exotic species Vittadinia gracilis but it is unknown whether this plant provides the necessary nutrients to the larvae to ensure their successful maturation.

== Conservation status ==
In 2015 this moth was classified under the New Zealand Threat Classification system as being "Nationally Critical". In 2025 this species was again classified as "Nationally Critical" with the report stating that urgent surveys were required to discover whether viable populations could be located.
