= Australothis hackeri =

Scientific classification
- Kingdom: Animalia
- Phylum: Arthropoda
- Class: Insecta
- Order: Lepidoptera
- Superfamily: Noctuoidea
- Family: Noctuidae
- Genus: Australothis
- Species: A. hackeri

Binomial name
- Australothis hackeri Kobes, 1995

Species of moth

Australothis hackeri is a species of moth of the family Noctuidae. It is only known from northern Sumatra.

Australothis hackeri was described by Lutz Kobes in 1995. However, based on the male genitalia, this species may be a synonym of Australothis tertia.
