= Flora Australiensis =

1863–1878 book by George Bentham

The title page of Volume 1 of Flora Australensis

Flora Australiensis: a description of the plants of the Australian Territory, more commonly referred to as Flora Australiensis, and also known by its standard abbreviation Fl. Austral., is a seven-volume Flora of Australia published between 1863 and 1878 by George Bentham, with the assistance of Ferdinand von Mueller. It was one of the famous Kew series of colonial floras, and the first flora of any large continental area that had ever been finished. In total the flora included descriptions of 8125 species.

Bentham prepared the flora from Kew; with Mueller, the first plant taxonomist residing permanently in Australia, loaning the entire collection of the National Herbarium of Victoria to Bentham over the course of several years. Mueller had been dissuaded from preparing a flora from Australia while in Australia by Bentham and Joseph Dalton Hooker since historic collections of Australian species were all held in European herbaria which Mueller could not access from Australia. Mueller did eventually produce his own flora of Australia, the Systematic Census of Australian Plants published in 1882 extended the work of Bentham with the addition of new species and taxonomic revisions.

Flora Australiensis was the standard reference work on the Australian flora for more than a century. As late as 1988, James Willis wrote that "Flora Australiensis still remains the only definitive work on the vascular vegetation of the whole continent." According to Nancy Burbidge, "it represents a prodigious intellectual effort never equalled."

Flora Australiensis is credited with forming the basis of subsequently published regional floras; 19th century floras were published for all states except Western Australia, they were for the most part extracts of this work.
