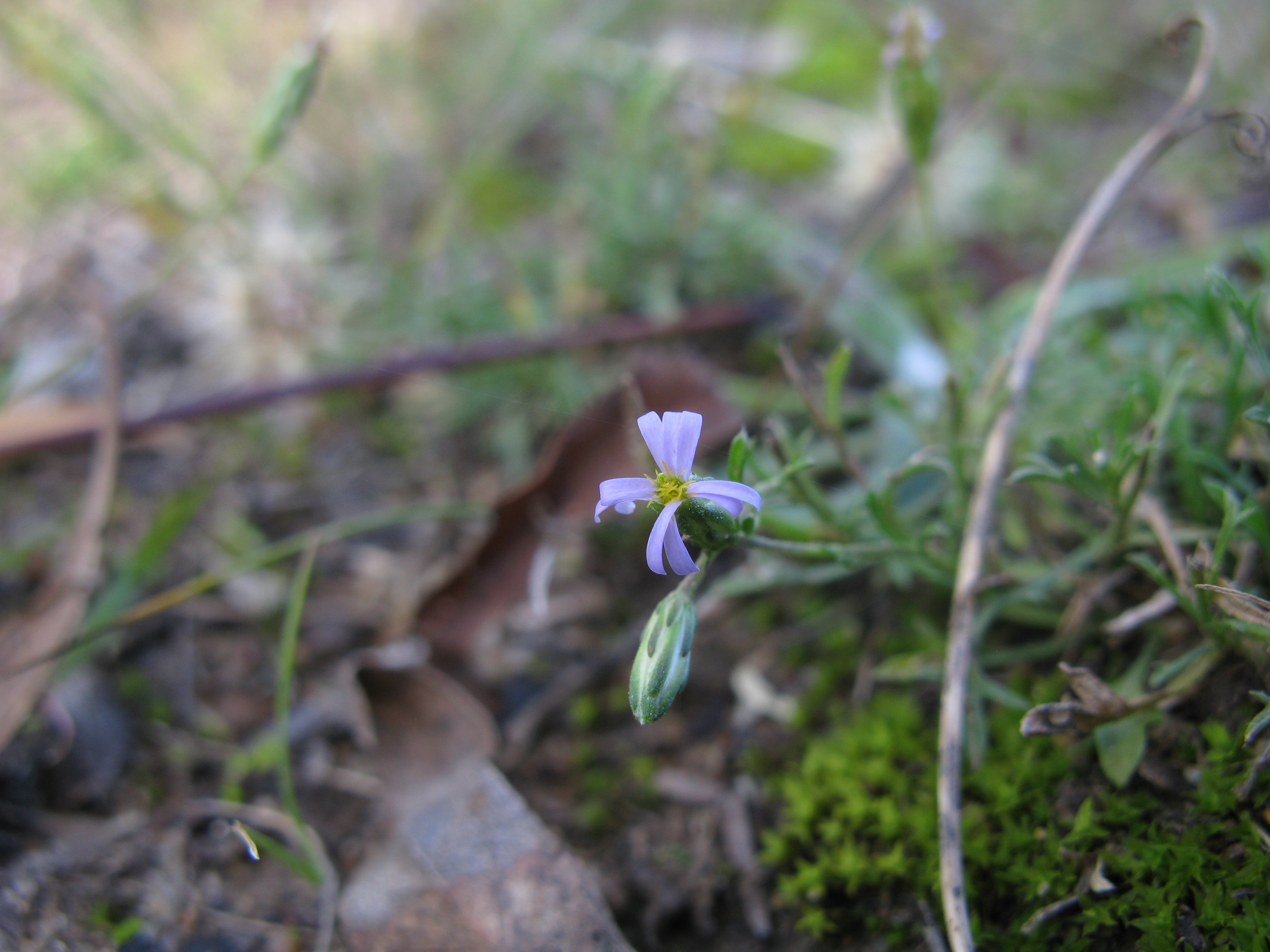

Scientific classification
- Kingdom: Plantae
- Clade: Embryophytes
- Clade: Tracheophytes
- Clade: Spermatophytes
- Clade: Angiosperms
- Clade: Eudicots
- Clade: Asterids
- Order: Asterales
- Family: Asteraceae
- Genus: Vittadinia
- Species: V. muelleri

Binomial name
- Vittadinia muelleri N.T.Burb.

= Vittadinia muelleri =

Narrow-leaf New Holland daisy

Species of plant

Vittadinia muelleri, commonly known as narrow-leaf New Holland daisy, is a flowering plant in the family Asteraceae. It is a small perennial forb with bright green leaves and purple daisy-like flowers. It grows in New South Wales, Victoria, Tasmania and the Australian Capital Territory.

== Description ==
Vittadinia muelleri is a perennial forb up to 20 cm (7.9 in) high, multi-stemmed from the base and a woody rootstock. The stems are leafy, branched or simple and covered sparsely or scattered with stiff, short, spreading hairs. The leaves are bright green, arranged alternately along the stem, linear to narrowly oval-shaped, 8–40 mm (0.31–1.57 in) long, 1–8 mm (0.039–0.315 in) wide and mostly with 1-3 pairs of pointed narrow lobes toward the tip, scattered, rough, simple hairs and the apex pointed. The bracts are oblong-shaped, up to 6–8 mm (0.24–0.31 in), almost smooth, margins sometimes with small hairs. The daisy-like flowers are purplish with a yellow centre, about 7 mm (0.28 in) across, ligules 1.5–2.5 mm (0.059–0.098 in) long. Flowering occurs mostly from November to May and the fruit is a wedge-shaped, flattened cypsela, ribbed and about 5 mm (0.20 in) long.

== Taxonomy ==
Vittadinia muelleri was first formally described in 1969 Nancy Tyson Burbidge and the description was published in Proceedings of the Linnean Society of New South Wales.

== Distribution and habitat ==
Narrow-leaf New Holland daisy grows in dry forests, woodlands, and grasslands in Victoria, New South Wales and Tasmania.
