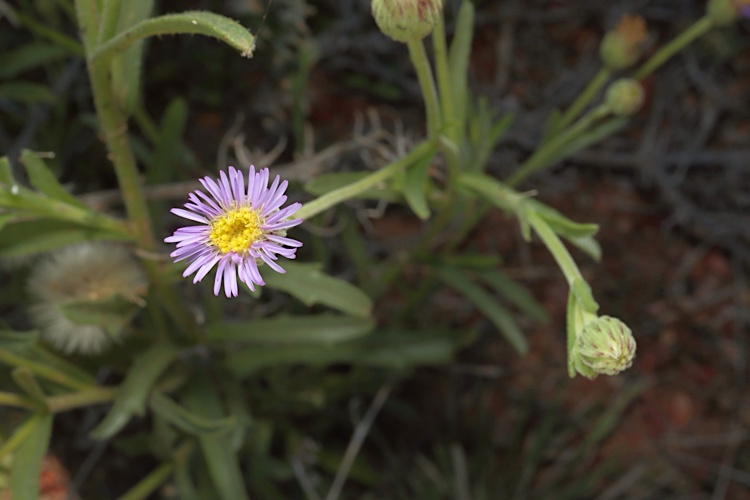

Scientific classification
- Kingdom: Plantae
- Clade: Embryophytes
- Clade: Tracheophytes
- Clade: Angiosperms
- Clade: Eudicots
- Clade: Asterids
- Order: Asterales
- Family: Asteraceae
- Genus: Vittadinia
- Species: V. arida

Binomial name
- Vittadinia arida N.T.Burb.

= Vittadinia arida =

Species of plant

Vittadinia arida is a flowering plant in the family Asteraceae. It is a small, annual herb with mauve or pink flowers and grows in Australian mainland states, Northern Territory with exception of Victoria.

== Description ==
Vittadinia arida is an upright, small, annual herb 10–30 cm (3.9–11.8 in) high, occasional bristles, sticky hairs and several glandular hairs. Leaves oblong to oblanceolate, flat, 15–40 mm (0.59–1.57 in) long, 2–8 mm (0.079–0.315 in) wide, margins entire or with 1 or 2 small, rounded lobes, lower leaves broader. Flowers pink or mauve, heads 6–7 mm (0.24–0.28 in) long, involucres 6–7 mm (0.24–0.28 in) long, bracts linear, tapering to a point. Flowering occurs from August to October and the fruit is a flattened achene, 2.5–3.5 mm (0.098–0.138 in) long, pale ridges and smooth.

== Taxonomy and naming ==
Vittadinia arida was first formally described in 1982 by Nancy Tyson Burbidge and the description was published in Brunonia.The specific epithet (arida) means arid, dry habitat.

== Distribution and habitat ==
This species of Vittadinia grows in rocky locations in Queensland, Victoria, New South Wales, South Australia, Western Australia and the Northern Territory.
