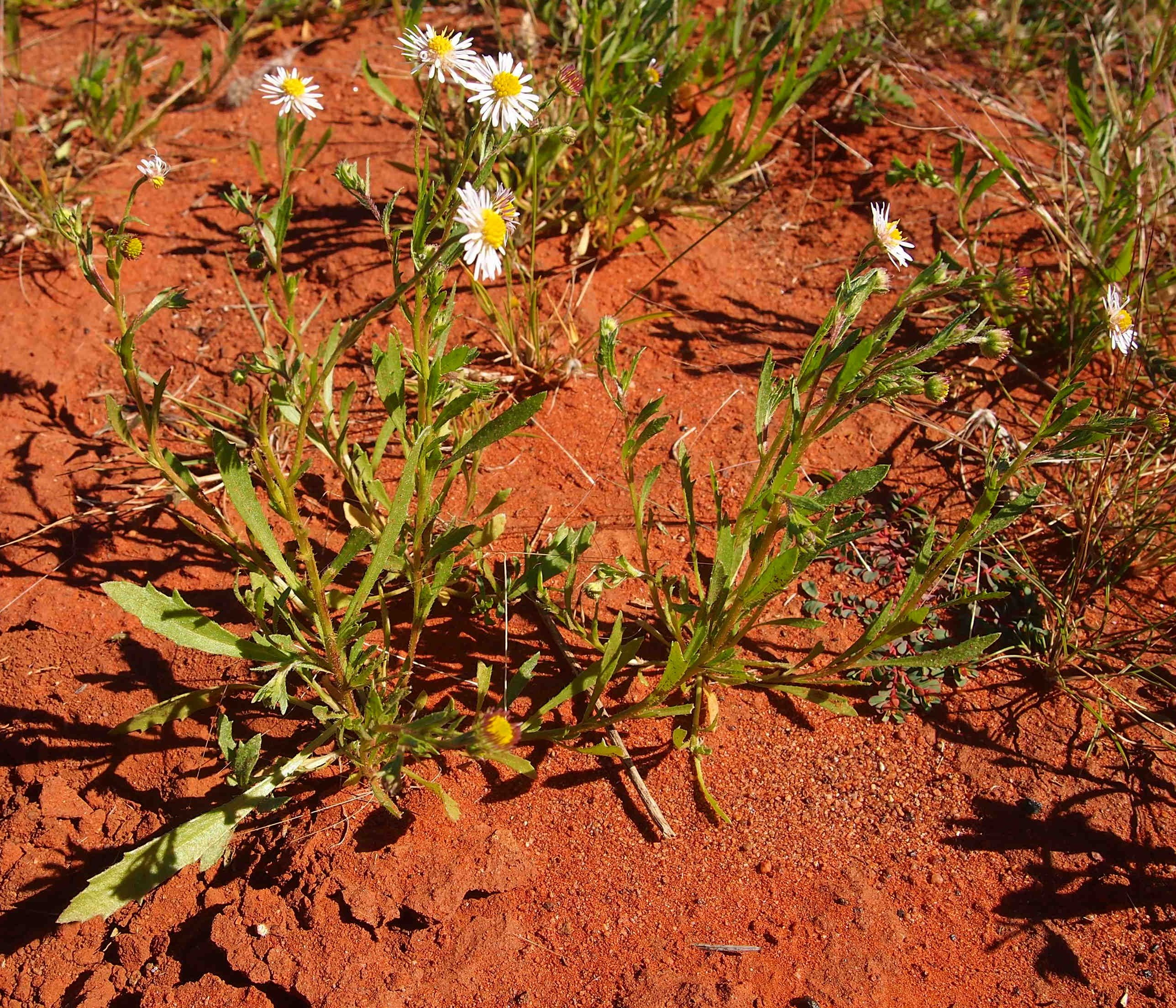
- Vittadinia arida

Scientific classification
- Kingdom: Plantae
- Clade: Embryophytes
- Clade: Tracheophytes
- Clade: Angiosperms
- Clade: Eudicots
- Clade: Asterids
- Order: Asterales
- Family: Asteraceae
- Subfamily: Asteroideae
- Tribe: Astereae
- Subtribe: Brachyscominae
- Genus: Vittadinia; A.Rich.

Synonyms
- Brachycome Gaudich.; Erigeron section Vittadinia (A.Rich.) Baillon

= Vittadinia =

Genus of flowering plants

Vittadinia is a genus of Australian and New Zealand plants in the tribe Astereae within the family Asteraceae.

== Taxonomy ==
The genus Vittadinia is attributed to the French botanist Achille Richard in 1832. He described a species collected in New Zealand as Vittadinia australis, noting that although it had similarities to the genus Aster, there were sufficient differences to distinguish it. Two he considered significant were that Vittadinia has only two rows of involucral bracts and that its anthers are free and bent into a shape resembling a bayonet.

Although species of Vittadinia were described from Hawaii by Asa Gray, and are accepted by some sources, these are now considered to belong to the genus Tetramolopium by the online Flora of the Hawaiian Islands, so that Vittadinia does not occur in Hawaii.

=== Species ===
currently accepted

- Vittadinia arida N.T.Burb. – WA NT Qld SA NSW
- Vittadinia australasica (Turcz.) N.T.Burb. – sticky New Holland daisy – Qld NSW Vic SA NT WA Tas
- Vittadinia australis A.Rich. – NZ; naturalised in India
- Vittadinia bicolor N.T.Burb. – Qld
- Vittadinia blackii N.T.Burb. – western New Holland daisy – NSW Vic SA WA
- Vittadinia burbidgeae A.M.Gray & Rozefelds – Tas
- Vittadinia cervicularis N.T.Burb. – annual New Holland daisy – Qld NSW Vic SA NT WA
- Vittadinia condyloides N.T.Burb. – club-hair New Holland daisy – NSW Vic SA WA
- Vittadinia constricta N.T.Burb. – Qld
- Vittadinia cuneata DC. – fuzweed, fuzzy New Holland daisy – Qld NSW Vic SA NT WA Tas
- Vittadinia decora N.T.Burb. – Qld
- Vittadinia diffusa N.T.Burb. – Qld
- Vittadinia dissecta (Benth.) N.T.Burb. – dissected New Holland daisy – Qld NSW Vic SA NT WA Tas
- Vittadinia eremaea N.T.Burb. – Qld NSW Vic SA NT WA
- Vittadinia gracilis (Hook.f.) N.T.Burb. – woolly New Holland daisy – Qld NSW Vic SA NT WA Tas
- Vittadinia hispidula F.Muell. ex A.Gray – WA NT QldNSW
- Vittadinia humerata N.T.Burb. – WA
- Vittadinia megacephala (Benth.) J.M.Black – giant New Holland daisy – SA Vic
- Vittadinia muelleri N.T.Burb. – narrow-leaf New Holland daisy – Qld NSW V Tas
- Vittadinia nullarborensis N.T.Burb. – WA SA
- Vittadinia obovata N.T.Burb. – WA NT Qld SA
- Vittadinia pterochaeta (F.Muell. ex Benth.) J.M.Black – winged New Holland daisy, rough fuzzweed – Qld NSW Vic SA NT
- Vittadinia pustulata N.T.Burb. – Qld NSW Vic SA NT WA
- Vittadinia scabra DC. – Qld NT NSW
- Vittadinia spechtii N.T.Burb. – NT WA
- Vittadinia sulcata N.T.Burb. – furrowed New Holland daisy – NSW Qld NT Vic SA WA
- Vittadinia tenuissima (Benth.) J.M.Black – Western New Holland daisy, delicate New Holland daisy – NSW Qld Vic
- Vittadinia triloba (Gaudich.) DC. – NZ, NSW
- Vittadinia virgata N.T.Burb. – NT WA

formerly included

Species formerly included in the genus Vittadinia, but now placed in Baccharis, Camptacra, Microgyne, Minuria and Tetramolopium, include:

- Vittadinia alinae F.Muell. – Tetramolopium alinae
- Vittadinia brachycomoides (F.Muell.) Benth. – Camptacra brachycomoides
- Vittadinia chamissonis A.Gray – Tetramolopium lepidotum
- Vittadinia disticha S.Moore – Tetramolopium distichum
- Vittadinia macra F.Muell. – Tetramolopium macrum
- Vittadinia macrorhiza (DC.) A.Gray – Minuria macrorhiza
- Vittadinia multifida Griseb. – Baccharis ulicina
- Vittadinia remyi A.Gray = Tetramolopium remyi
- Vittadinia trifurcata (Less.) Benth. & Hook.f. ex Griseb. – Microgyne trifurcata
