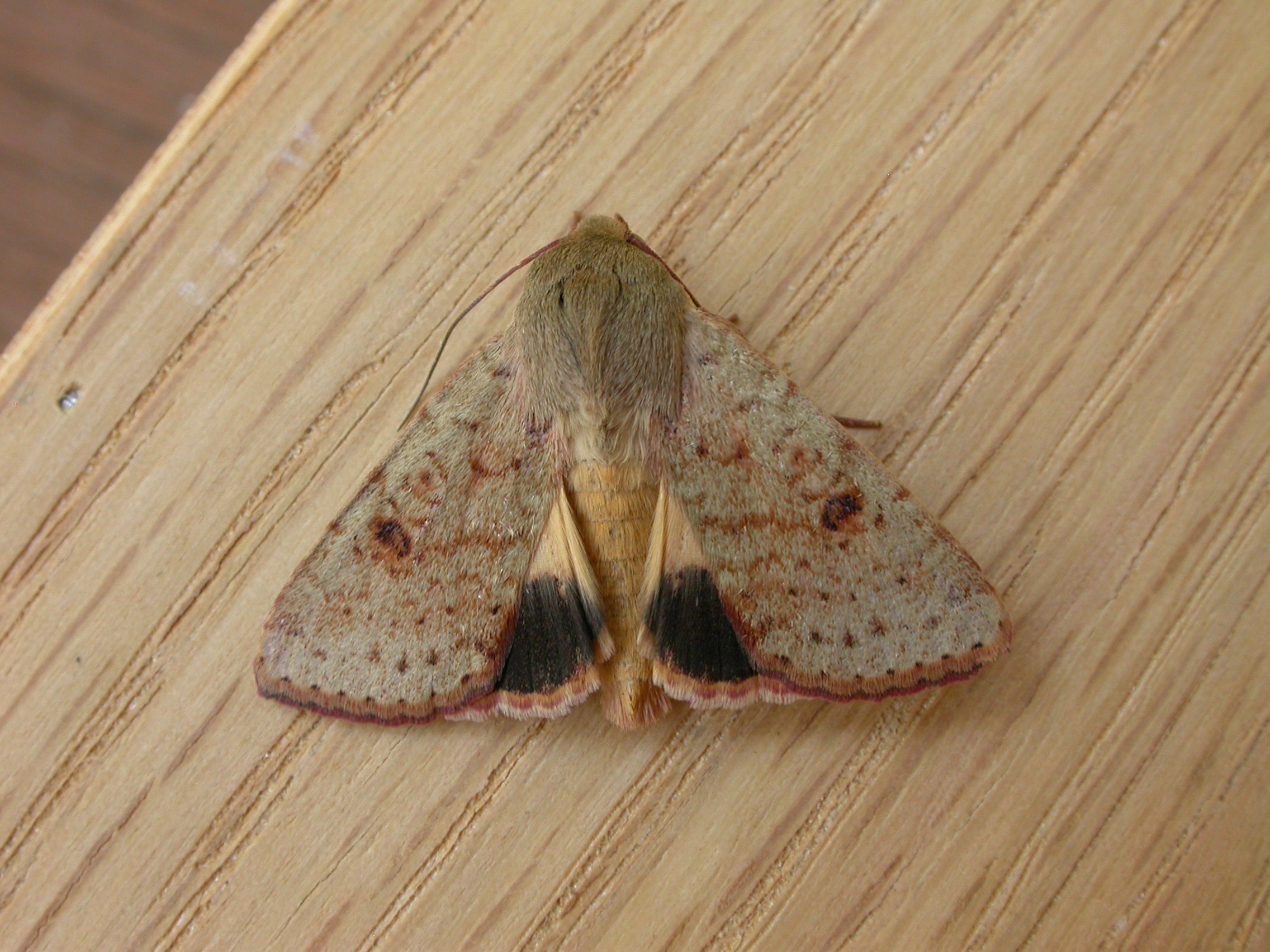
- Australothis rubrescens

Scientific classification
- Kingdom: Animalia
- Phylum: Arthropoda
- Class: Insecta
- Order: Lepidoptera
- Superfamily: Noctuoidea
- Family: Noctuidae
- Subfamily: Heliothinae
- Genus: Australothis; Matthews, 1991

= Australothis =

Genus of moths

Australothis is a genus of moths of the family Noctuidae.

== Species ==
- Australothis exopisso Matthews, 1999
- Australothis hackeri Kobes, 1995
- Australothis rubrescens - Indian Weed Caterpillar (Walker, 1858)
- Australothis tertia (Roepke, 1941)
- Australothis volatilis Matthews & Patrick, 1998
