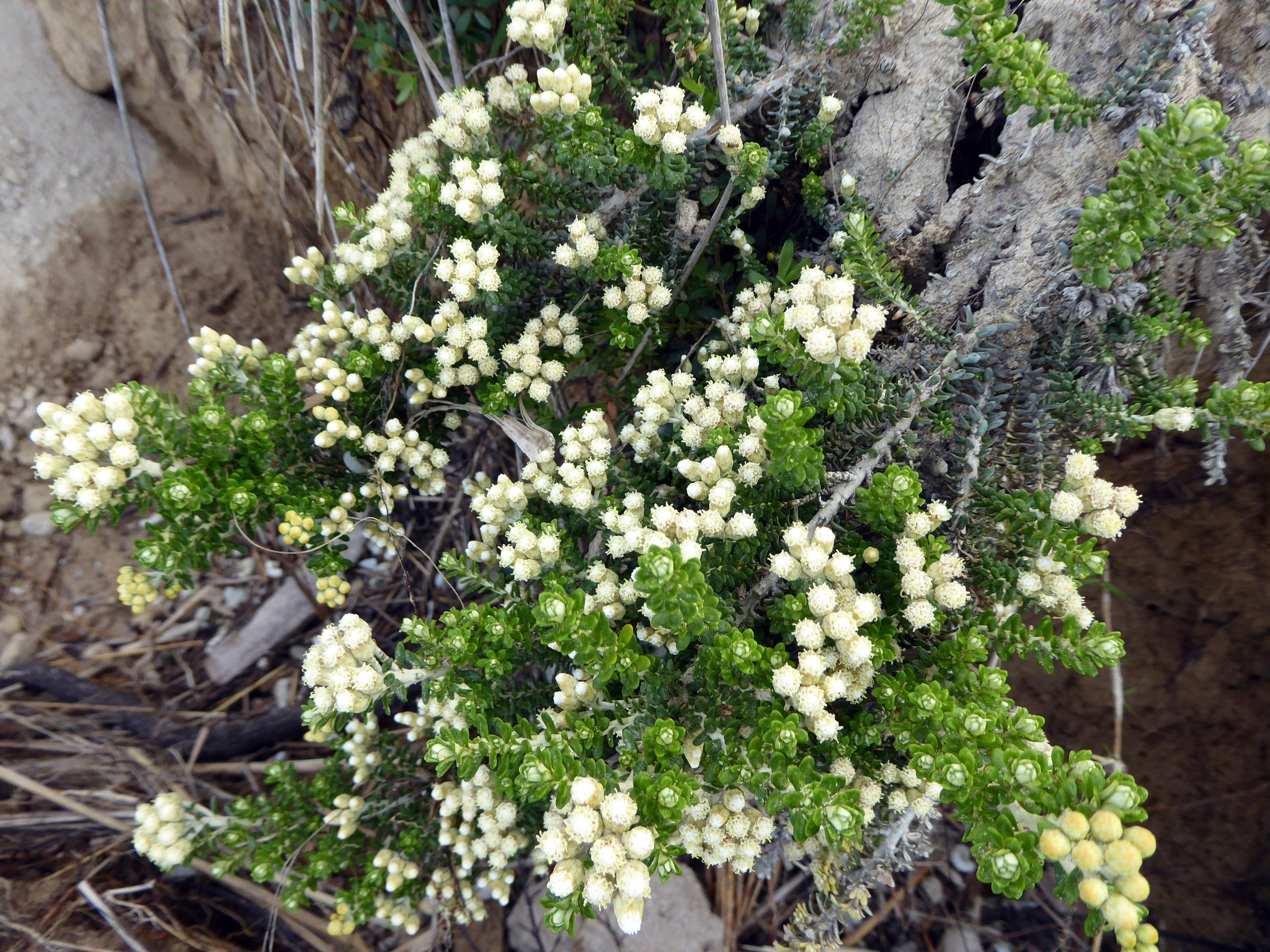
- O. leptophyllus observed by New Zealand botanist Peter de Lange

Scientific classification
- Kingdom: Plantae
- Clade: Tracheophytes
- Clade: Angiosperms
- Clade: Eudicots
- Clade: Asterids
- Order: Asterales
- Family: Asteraceae
- Genus: Ozothamnus
- Species: O. leptophyllus

Binomial name
- Ozothamnus leptophyllus (G.Forst.) Breitw. & J.M.Ward

= Ozothamnus leptophyllus =

Species of shrub

Ozothamnus leptophyllus, commonly known as tauhinu or cottonwood, is an endemic shrub of New Zealand. Tauhinu is fast-growing, reaching 2 metres in height and is a common plant of coastal farmland. This species is host to the larvae of the New Zealand endemic moth Homoeosoma anaspila.

== Description ==
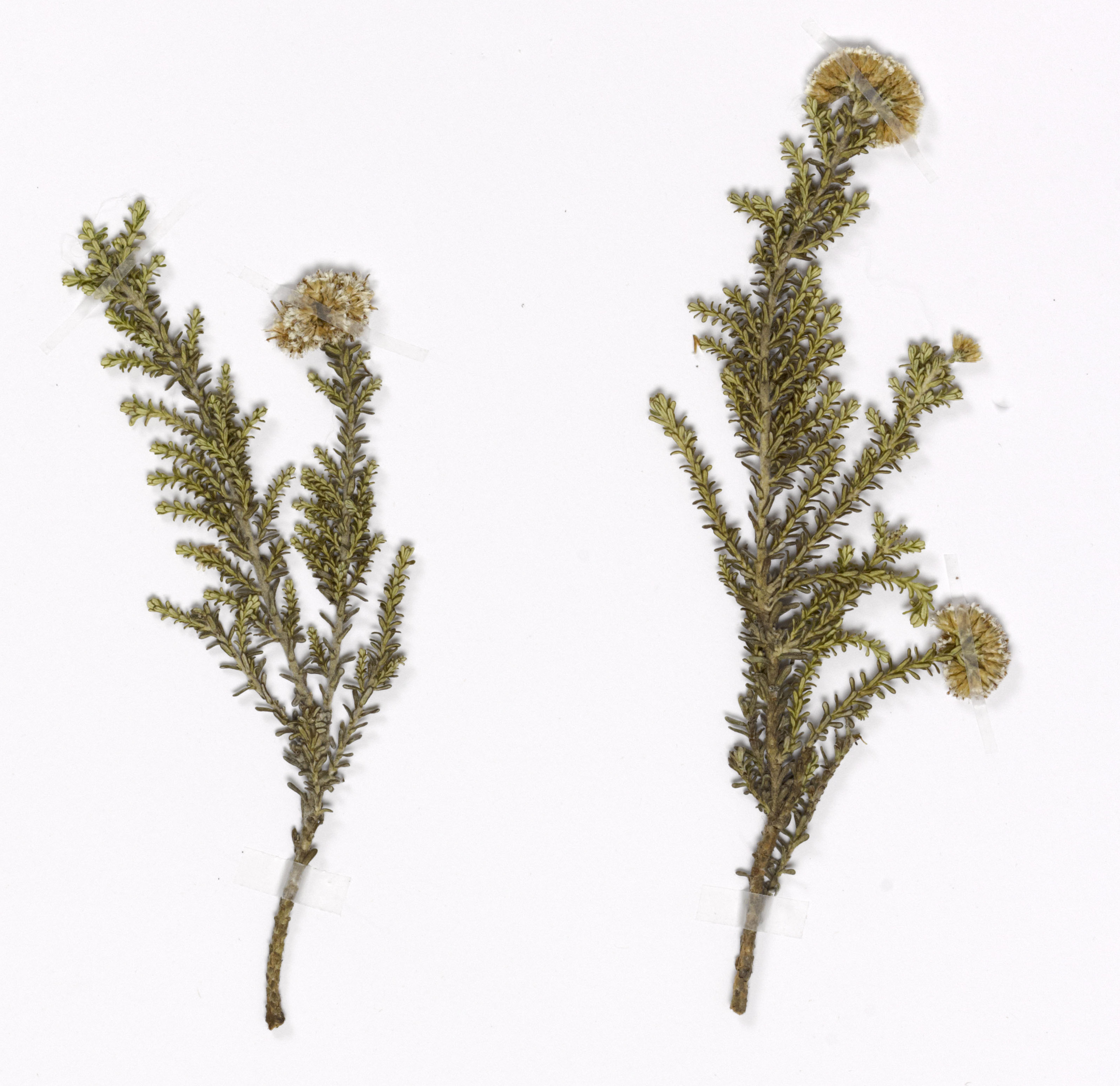
Herbarium specimen of Ozothamnus leptophyllus from the Auckland War Memorial Museum Herbarium

This dicot plant species is described as a gray or yellow-green bushy shrub being as tall as 5 meters, but most commonly stands at a height of around 2 to 3 meters tall. The stems of these leaves are very tomentose, meaning that the stems of these plants are covered with dense wooly hairs. Ozothamnus leptophyllus has simple broad leaves with an alternate leaf arrangement pattern which they use for photosynthesis and are self-supporting, only needing itself to grow vertically. Young leaves are slightly sticky, but when mature range from being glabrous to moderately hairy with a moderate amount of white hair populating the surface of the leaf. Leaves are up to 3mm wide and are spatulate. The branchlets of the plant are slender and hairless and the petioles, the stalk that attaches the leaf to the stem, surround branchlets and where leaves are arranged in series of three to four. The flowers of this plant tend to mostly be white, though on occasion have touches of pink or red on the bud, and have 4–15 florets per capitulum.

== Range ==
While Ozothamnus leptophyllus is endemic to New Zealand, the Ozothamnus genus is found globally. Ozothamnus leptophyllus is found throughout the whole of New Zealand, including the North, South, Stewart, and Auckland Islands. The species itself is quite common and as of 2012, it is in the conservation status of "Non Threatened".

== Habitat ==
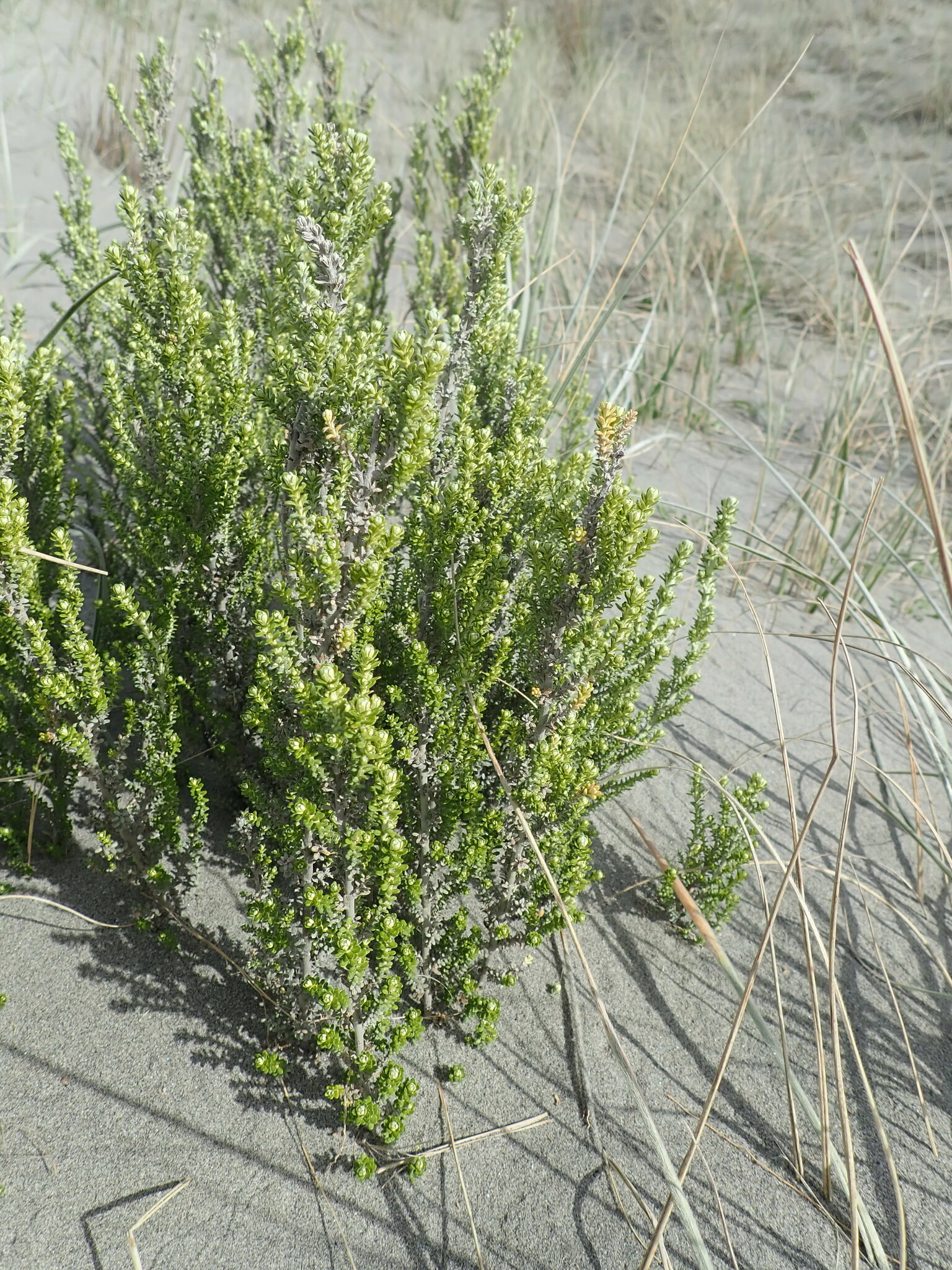
Ozothamnus leptophyllus growing at Himatangi Beach in the Manawatū

The habitat of Ozothamnus leptophyllus is coastal to subalpine shrubland and scrub. It is present in open areas such as erosion gutters or avalanche chutes, and thrives most in land where the ground cover has been removed. It adapts to a variety of habitats, and thus is a common plant in New Zealand, especially in open areas.

== Ecology ==
=== Phenology ===
The period of flowering for Ozothamnus leptophyllus is commonly described between December and March, though Allan puts the timing between November and February, with the fruits typically appearing soon after this and staying until April. Seed ripening typically begins in late January, reaching its peak in March, and it is during this month that a vast majority of the seed are dispersed with the help of wind. The branches of the Ozothamnus leptophyllus are marked with growth rings, allowing scientists to note the age of the plant; however, these only become evident until the branches reach an estimated age of eight years.

=== Growth preferences ===
Being found throughout the whole of New Zealand, Ozothamnus leptophyllus is able to survive in a variety of soil, water, and weather conditions. However, this plant cannot survive in alpine conditions since it is only found coastal to subalpine shrubland and scrub. Ozothamnus leptophyllus requires a high light intensity for it to be successful, though it is able to tolerate a wide range of soil types, as well as having a high salt and wind tolerance.

=== Predators, parasites, and diseases ===
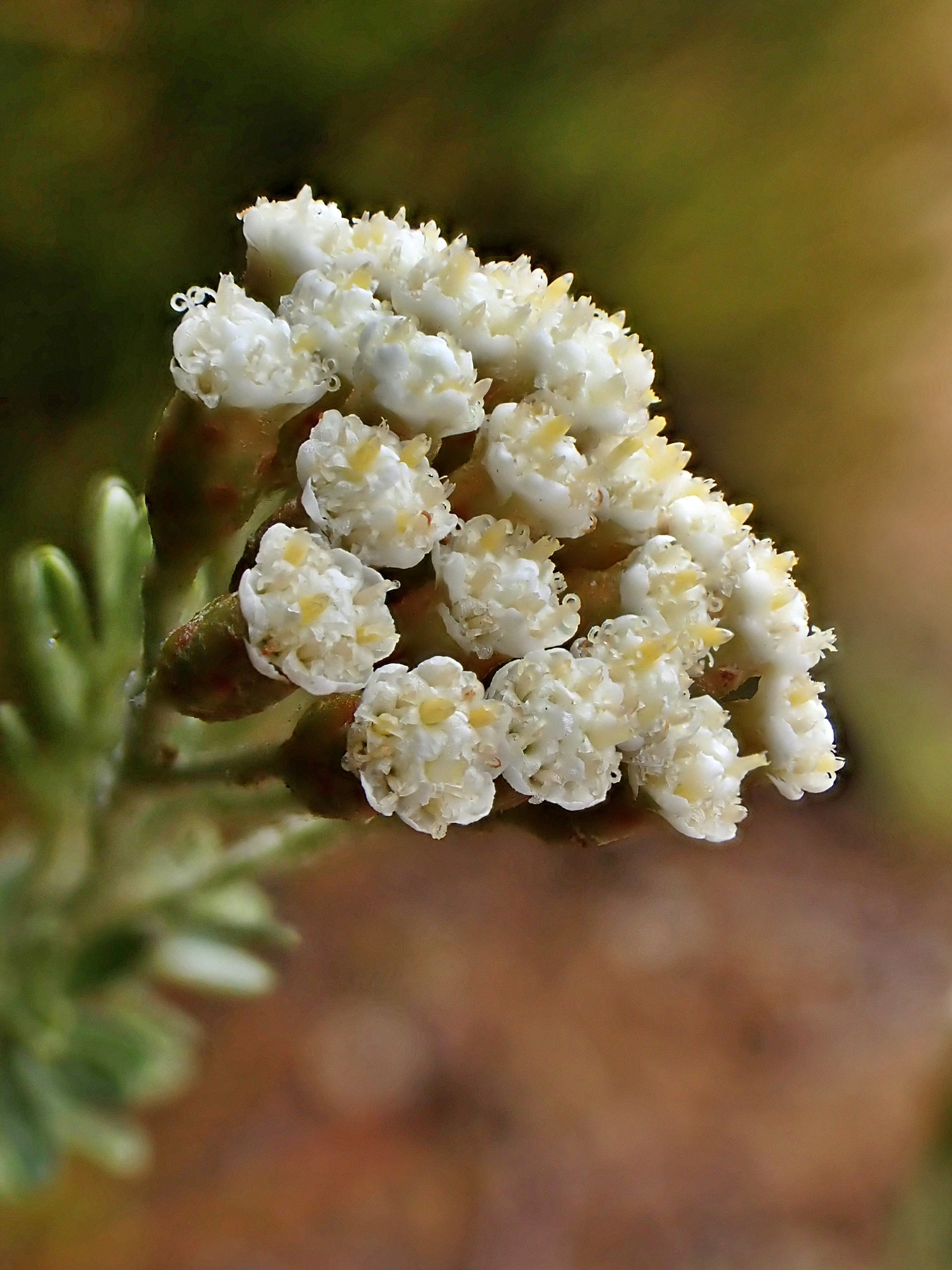
Close up of flowers

Being a plant, it is often visited by insects and other herbivores that use the leaves of this plant for their own energy. It is difficult to ascertain all the herbivores that feed on this plant since there are many, but there are a couple of species that are known to visit and feed on both the leaves and the flowers of this plant. One of these species that visit the flowers of the Ozothamnus leptophyllus include the gorse pod moth (Cydia succedana), a species of moth found in Europe that was introduced to New Zealand as a way to biologically control the gorse plant. Another species which often visits the flowers is the large hoverfly (Melangyna novaezelandiae) who feeds on the pollen of this plant, but also serves to help pollinate the Ozothamnus leptophyllus. The European rabbit (Oryctolagus cuniculus) is also known to feed on the leaves of the Ozothamnus leptophyllus. Ozothamnus leptophyllus is also the host to several species of moth larvae, including Homoeosoma anaspila and Harmologa sisyrana, who feed on the plant until maturity. The bug Cyperobia carectorum is also known to eat the leaves of the Ozothamnus leptophyllus as well as being a host for it. Some other known insects that feed on the Ozothamnus leptophyllus include leafhoppers, scale insects, looper caterpillars, clothes moths, psyllids, wheat bugs, and many other types of insects. Though this plant is able to adapt to many of the climates found around New Zealand, it can be outcompeted by tussock grasses due to the reduced light and nutrients that are found in areas with strong growing tussock grasses.

== History ==
The process of naming this plant seems to have been incredibly difficult since it took over two hundred years for the plant to be successfully named. First being recorded as Calea leptophylla in 1786 in the writings of Georg Forster, it was commonly attributed to the genus Cassinia, with Robert Brown being the first individual to switch it into this genus. In his 1817 publication "Some Observations on the Natural Family of Plants called Compositae", he described this species in great detail and even stated how similar Cassinia and Ozothamnus are before ultimately placing the plant into the genus Cassinia due to the perceived absence of the paleae, which are the upper bract of the floret of a grass, on the plant. Ozothamnus leptophyllus would be continually placed in the genus Cassinia, but would switch around in species before being correctly placed in the genus Ozothamnus by scientists Josephine Ward and Ilse Breitwieser in 1997.

== Scientific uses ==
The leaves have shown evidence of having strong antiviral properties against both polio and herpes as well as possessing antifungal and antimicrobial properties, but these antimicrobial and fungal are much weaker in comparison to the antiviral properties that Ozothamnus leptophyllus possesses.

== Etymology ==
The etymology of the name is derived from the Greek word 'ozo', which means to smell and 'thamnus' which means shrub, while leptophyllus means "with slender leaves" .

== Revegetation and cultivation ==
This plant has also started to increase in popularity for revegetation and cultivation due to it being fast growing, easy, quite tolerant of many different conditions, which makes it perfect for sand dune restoration.

== Chromosome count ==
On a molecular level it has a chromosome count of 2n = 26–28.
