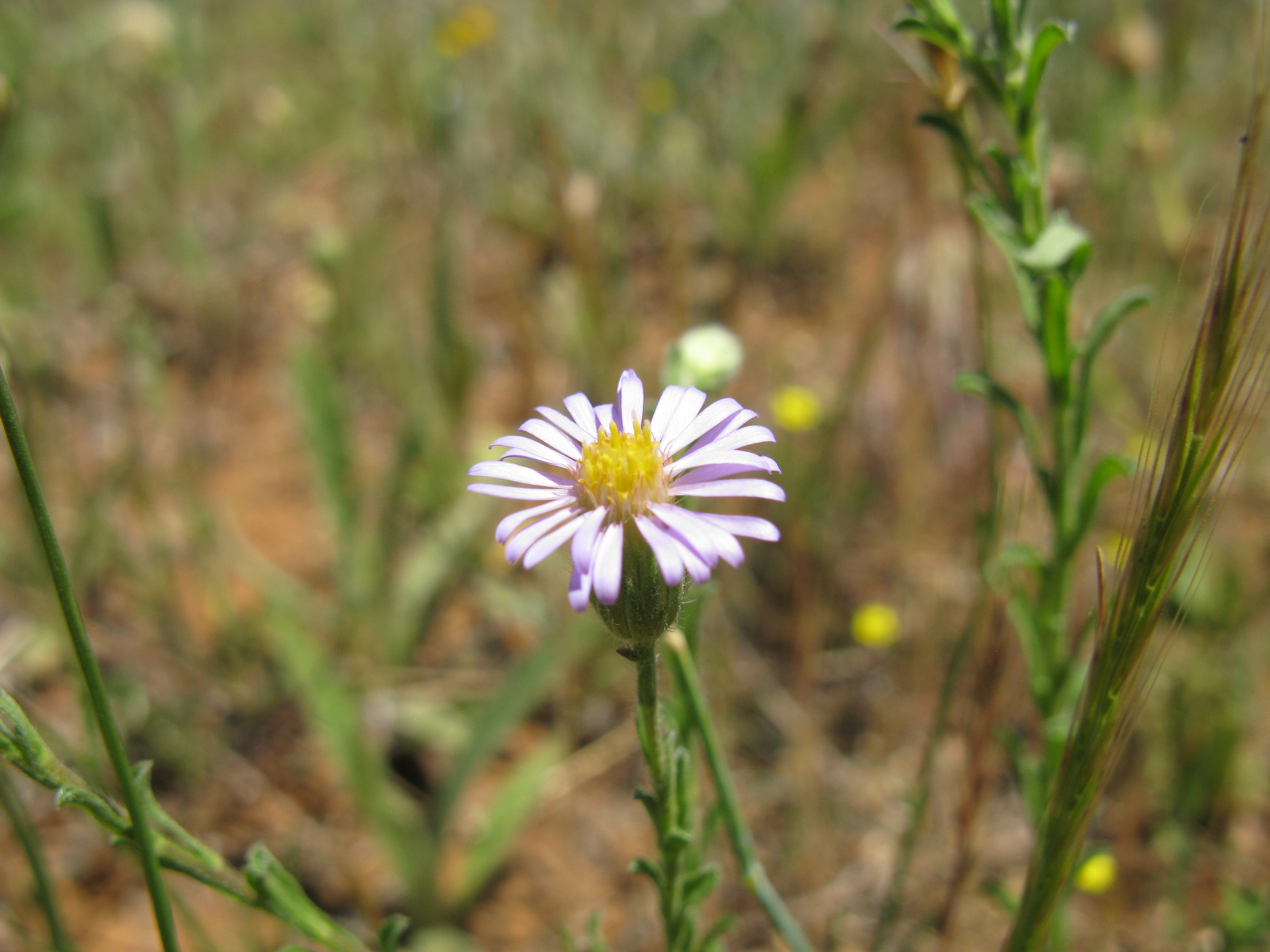

Scientific classification
- Kingdom: Plantae
- Clade: Tracheophytes
- Clade: Angiosperms
- Clade: Eudicots
- Clade: Asterids
- Order: Asterales
- Family: Asteraceae
- Genus: Vittadinia
- Species: V. cuneata

Binomial name
- Vittadinia cuneata DC.

= Vittadinia cuneata =

Fuzzy New Holland daisy

Species of plant

Vittadinia cuneata commonly known as fuzzy New Holland daisy,it is a flowering plant in the family Asteraceae. It is an upright perennial with variable leaves, blue or mauve flowers and grows in all mainland states of Australia and Tasmania.

== Description ==
Vittadinia cuneata is an upright annual or perennial, 10–40 cm (3.9–15.7 in) high, stiff stems and more or less covered in glandular, coarse, rough hairs. Leaves are variable in colour, sometimes green or grey-green, wedge-shaped, occasionally with lobes, 10–25 mm (0.39–0.98 in) long and 2–5 mm (0.079–0.197 in) wide. Flower petals are pale blue or mauve with a yellow central disk. Flowering occurs from spring to autumn and the fruit is a bristly, ridged achene, 4–7 mm (0.16–0.28 in) long. Three varieties are recognized: var. cuneata, var. hirsuta and var. morrisii.

== Taxonomy and naming ==
Vittadinia cuneata was first formally described in 1836 by Augustin Pyramus de Candolle and the description was published in Prodromus Systematis Naturalis Regni Vegetabilis. The type specimen was collected in 1817 by Allan Cunningham on the banks of the Lachlan River. The specific epithet (cuneata) means 'wedge-shaped'.

== Distribution and habitat ==
Fuzzy New Holland daisy is a widespread species and grows in a variety of different habitats including sand, clay and limestone in woodland and mallee in New South Wales, Queensland, Tasmania, Victoria, Western Australia and South Australia.
