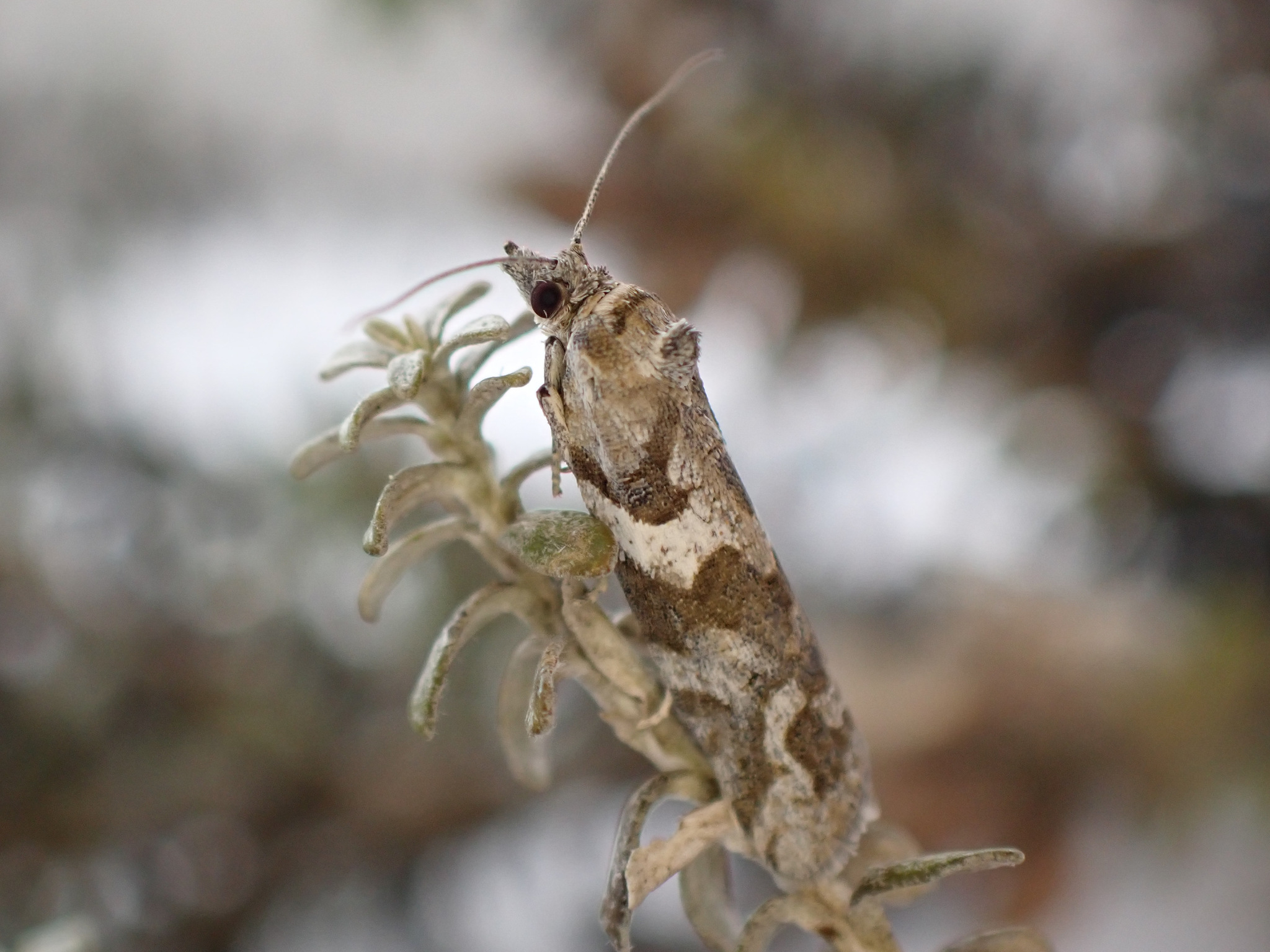
- Adult
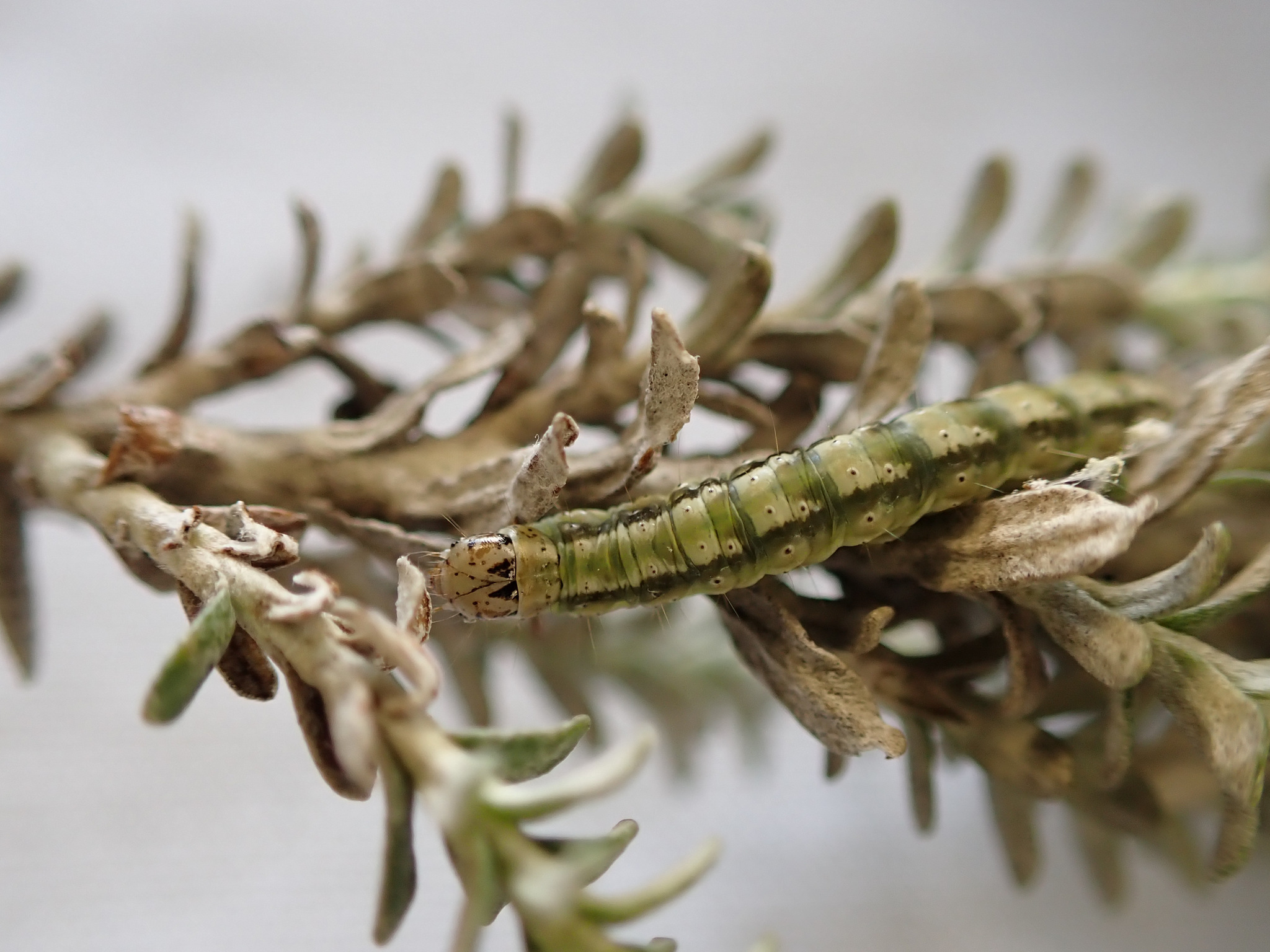
- Larva

Scientific classification
- Kingdom: Animalia
- Phylum: Arthropoda
- Class: Insecta
- Order: Lepidoptera
- Family: Tortricidae
- Genus: Harmologa
- Species: H. sisyrana

Binomial name
- Harmologa sisyrana Meyrick, 1882

Synonyms
- Harmologa antitypa Meyrick, 1914

= Harmologa sisyrana =

Species of moth endemic to New Zealand

Harmologa sisyrana is a species of moth of the family Tortricidae. This species was first described by Edward Meyrick in 1882. It is endemic to New Zealand and has been observed in the North and South Islands. The larvae of H. sisyrana are leaf rollers and are active, constructing a silken gallery amongst the leaves of their host plant Ozothamnus leptophyllus in order to feed. They feed from New Zealand spring until early summer. The pupa is enclosed in the larval habitat. Adults inhabit open spaces where O. leptophyllus is common and can often be found in sand hills near the coastline. Adults are on the wing from November until May and are attracted to light.

== Taxonomy ==
This species was first described by Edward Meyrick in 1882 using two specimens collected on sandhills at Kaiapoi. Meyrick went on to give a more detailed description of the species in 1883. In 1914, thinking he was describing a new species, Meyrick named this moth Harmologa antitypa. In 1928 George Hudson discussed and illustrated H. sisyrana in his book The butterflies and moths of New Zealand. At the same time Hudson also synonymised H. antitypa into H. sisyrana. The male lectotype, collected at Christchurch, is held at the Natural History Museum, London.

== Description ==
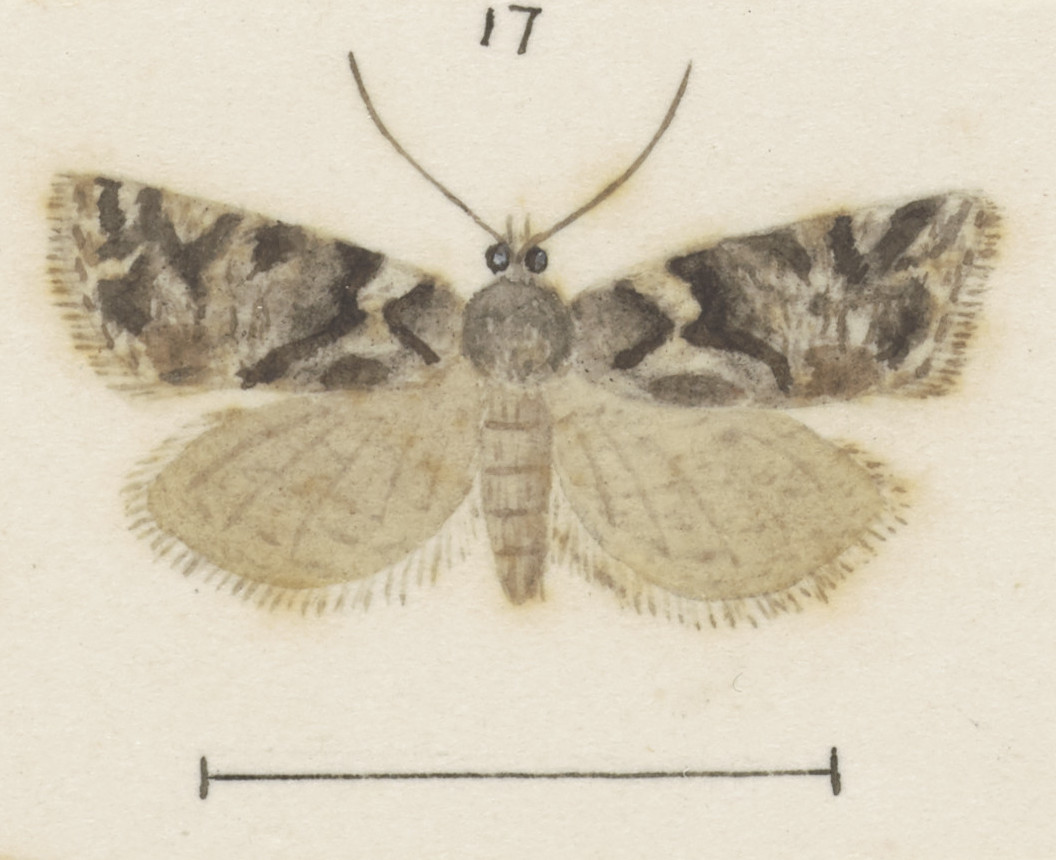
Illustration of H. sisyrana.

Hudson described the larva of this species as follows:

The larva is somewhat flattened, almost uniform in thickness, slightly tapering posteriorly; the head is dull ochreous with four pale brown stripes and several dots; the body pale green with two very broad, rather irregular, clear white dorsal lines interrupted at each segmental division; there is a broad dark green sub-dorsal line and a wavy whitish lateral ridge; the lower portions of the larva are very pale green; segments 3 and 4 have a single row of blackish warts, the other segments, except the last, a double row; each wart emits a bristle; the length of the full-grown larva is about 5/8 inch.

Meyrick described this species as follows:

Male, 17 1/2 mm; female, 20 mm.—Head, palpi, and thorax grey-whitish, mixed with fuscous-grey and blackish; palpi rather short; thorax crested. Antennae grey. Abdomen whitish-grey. Legs grey-whitish, anterior and middle tibiae and all tarsi suffusedly banded with dark fuscous. Forewings moderate, in female more elongate, costa moderately arched, hindmargin obliquely rounded, in female very faintly sinuate; whitish, mixed with grey, with fine scattered irregular blackish strigulae throughout; basal patch greyer, ill-defined, outer edge irregularly angulated in middle, marked by a somewhat stronger black strigula; central fascia moderate, ill-defined, fuscous-grey, running from before middle of costa to 2/3 of inner margin, edges very irregular, anterior edge rather deeply emarginate above and below middle, towards inner margin partially obsolete; four small subquadrate fuscous-grey spots on costa towards apex, in female giving rise to confused very irregularly reticulated fuscous-grey lines proceeding obliquely to hindmargin: cilia grey-whitish, basal third within a dark grey line whitish barred with dark grey. Hindwings grey, paler in female, spotted with darker; cilia whitish, with a grey basal line.

The female of the species is larger and paler than the male.

== Distribution ==
This species is endemic to New Zealand, and has been observed in both the North and South Islands.

== Host and habitat ==
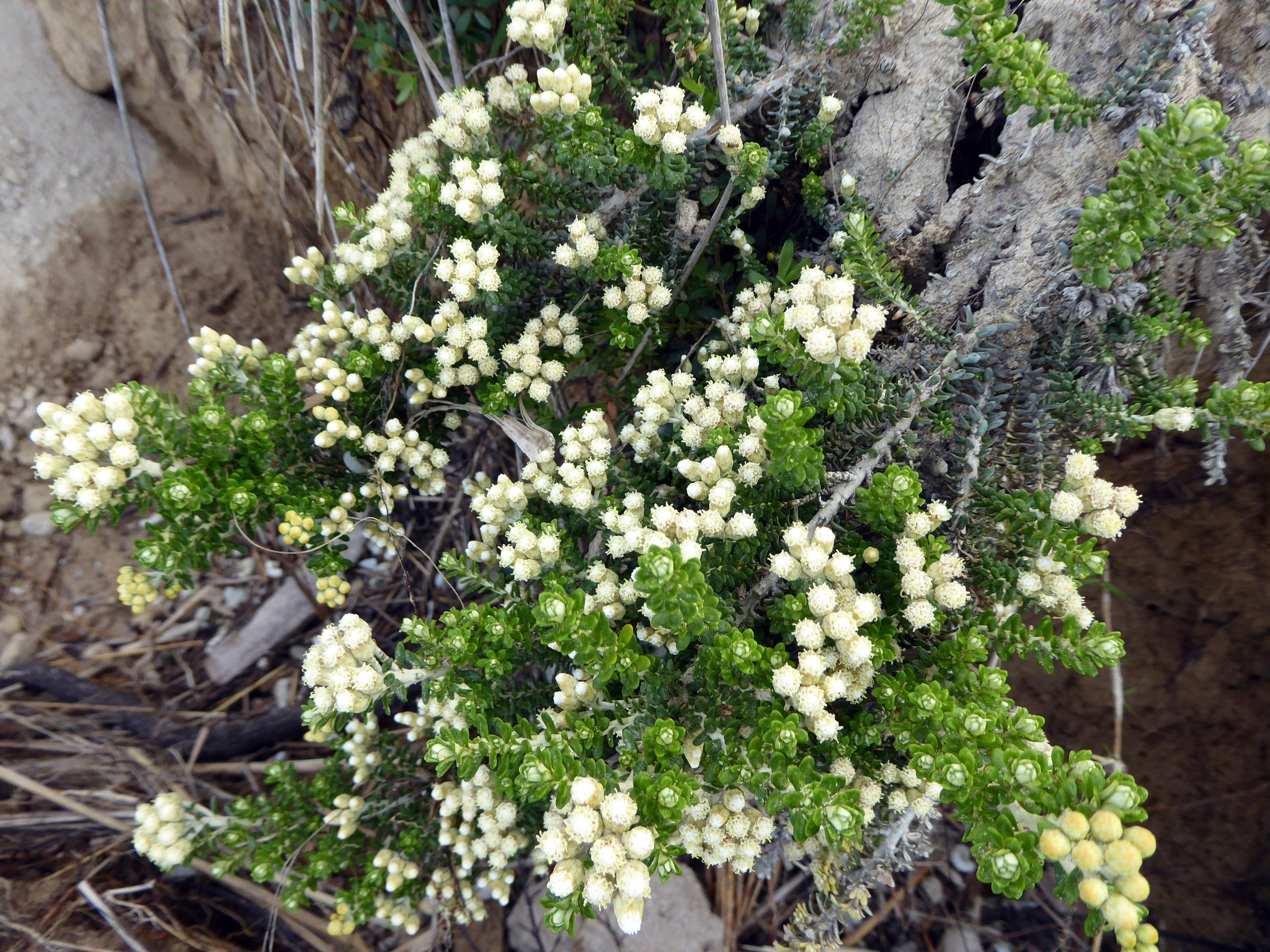
Larval host plant Ozothamnus leptophyllus.

The larvae of this species are leaf rollers and feed on the leaves of their host. The larval host plant is Ozothamnus leptophyllus. Adults inhabit open spaces where O. leptophyllus is common and also frequent sand hills near the coastline.

== Behaviour ==
The larvae are active and construct a silken gallery amongst the leaves of its host plant in order to feed from New Zealand spring until early summer. The pupa is enclosed in the larval habitat. Adults are on the wing from November until May and are attracted to light.
