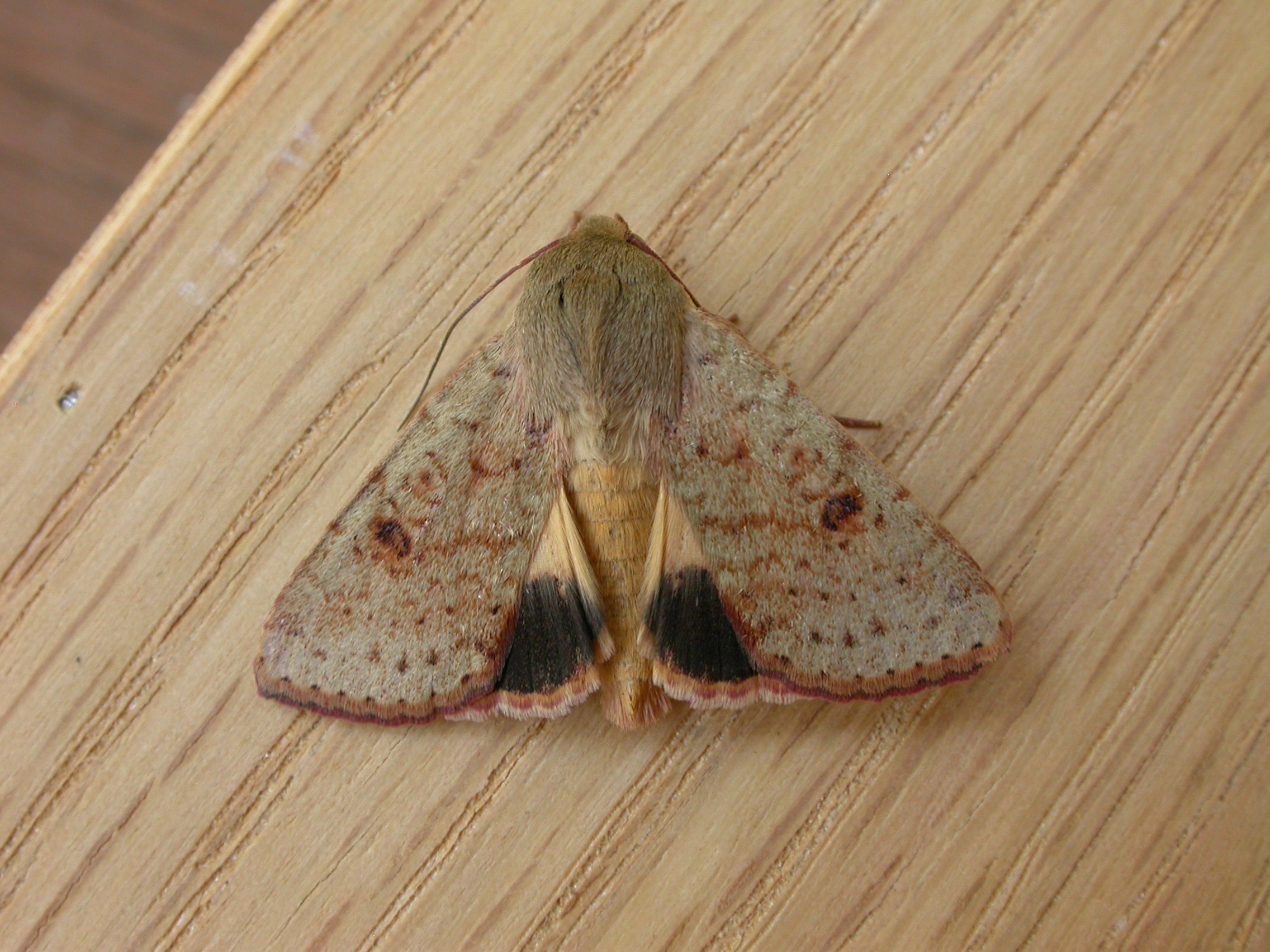

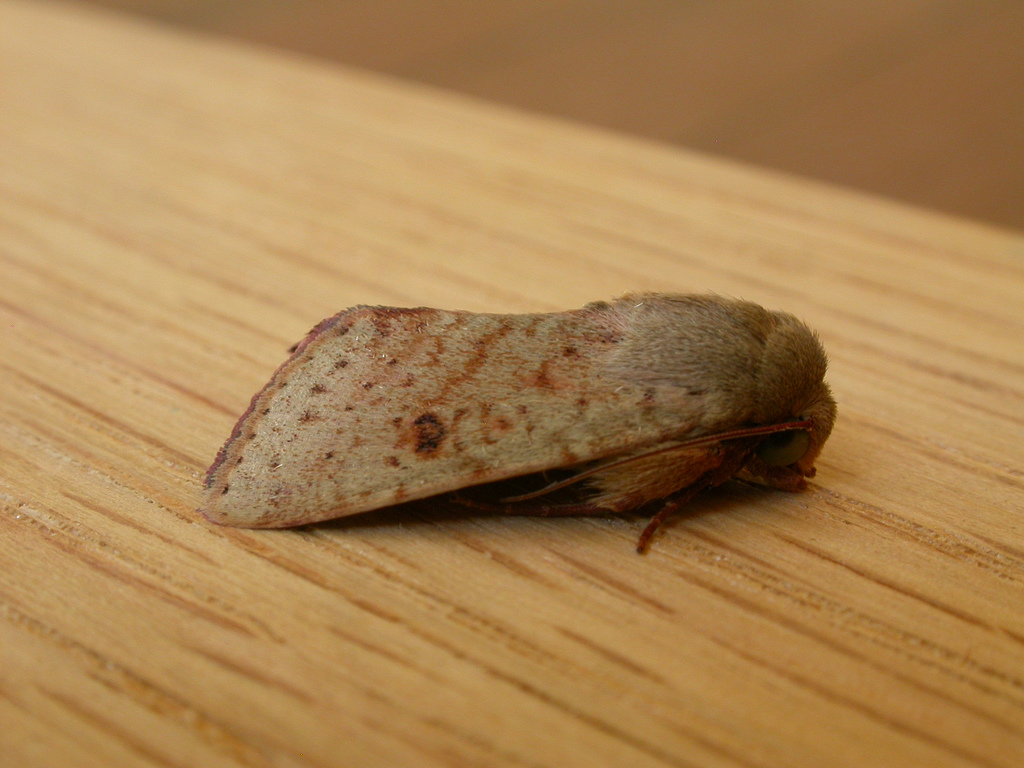

Scientific classification
- Kingdom: Animalia
- Phylum: Arthropoda
- Class: Insecta
- Order: Lepidoptera
- Superfamily: Noctuoidea
- Family: Noctuidae
- Genus: Australothis
- Species: A. rubrescens

Binomial name
- Australothis rubrescens Walker, 1858

Synonyms
- Thalpophila rubrescens Walker, 1858; Chloridea aresca Turner, 1911; Chloridea caesia Warren, 1913; Chloridea rufa Warren, 1913; Heliothis hyperchroa Turner, 1920

= Australothis rubrescens =

Indian weed caterpillar

Species of moth

Australothis rubrescens, the Indian weed caterpillar, is a moth of the family Noctuidae. It is found all over Australia (including Tasmania) and in Papua New Guinea.

Larvae have been recorded on Sigesbeckia orientalis, Ixiolaena brevicompta, Podolepis longipedata, Hibisucs, Nicotiana tabacum, Solanum dioicum and Stylidium productum.
