= Australothis exopisso =

Scientific classification
- Domain: Eukaryota
- Kingdom: Animalia
- Phylum: Arthropoda
- Class: Insecta
- Order: Lepidoptera
- Superfamily: Noctuoidea
- Family: Noctuidae
- Genus: Australothis
- Species: A. exopisso

Binomial name
- Australothis exopisso Matthews, 1999

Species of moth

Australothis exopisso is a species of moth of the family Noctuidae. It is endemic to the Northern Territory in Australia.
