= Tetramolopium capillare =

Conservation status
- Critically Imperiled (NatureServe)

Scientific classification
- Kingdom: Plantae
- Clade: Tracheophytes
- Clade: Angiosperms
- Clade: Eudicots
- Clade: Asterids
- Order: Asterales
- Family: Asteraceae
- Genus: Tetramolopium
- Species: T. capillare

Binomial name
- Tetramolopium capillare (Gaudich.) H.St.John

Species of plant

Tetramolopium capillare is a rare species of flowering plant in the family Asteraceae known by the common name pamakani. It is endemic to Hawaii, where it is known only from the island of Maui. There are four occurrences for a total of fewer than 200 individuals. It is threatened by the degradation of its habitat caused by introduced plant species. It is a federally listed endangered species of the United States.

This plant is a spreading shrub growing up to about 80 centimeters long and bearing solitary flower heads. It grows in shrubland and chaparral habitat, often on slopes and ridges.
