= Tetramolopium arenarium =

Conservation status
- Critically Imperiled (NatureServe)

Scientific classification
- Kingdom: Plantae
- Clade: Tracheophytes
- Clade: Angiosperms
- Clade: Eudicots
- Clade: Asterids
- Order: Asterales
- Family: Asteraceae
- Genus: Tetramolopium
- Species: T. arenarium

Binomial name
- Tetramolopium arenarium (A.Gray) Hillebr.

Species of plant

Tetramolopium arenarium is a rare species of flowering plant in the family Asteraceae known by the common name Maui tetramolopium. It is endemic to Hawaii, where it is known only from the island of Hawaii. It is extirpated from Maui. It is threatened by the degradation of its habitat. It is a federally listed endangered species of the United States.

This plant was collected in the late 1800s and then not seen again for many decades. It was presumed extinct until it was rediscovered in 1989 in the Pohakuloa Training Area on the island of Hawaii. There is currently one known population containing fewer than 500 individuals.

This shrub grows 80 to 130 centimeters tall. It is hairy and glandular. The leaves are lance-shaped and toothed or smooth-edged and measure up to 3.7 centimeters in length. The inflorescence contains up to 11 flower heads containing white ray florets and maroon disc florets.

Threats to this species include habitat destruction and degradation by feral ungulates such as pigs, and competition from introduced species of plants such as fountain grass.
