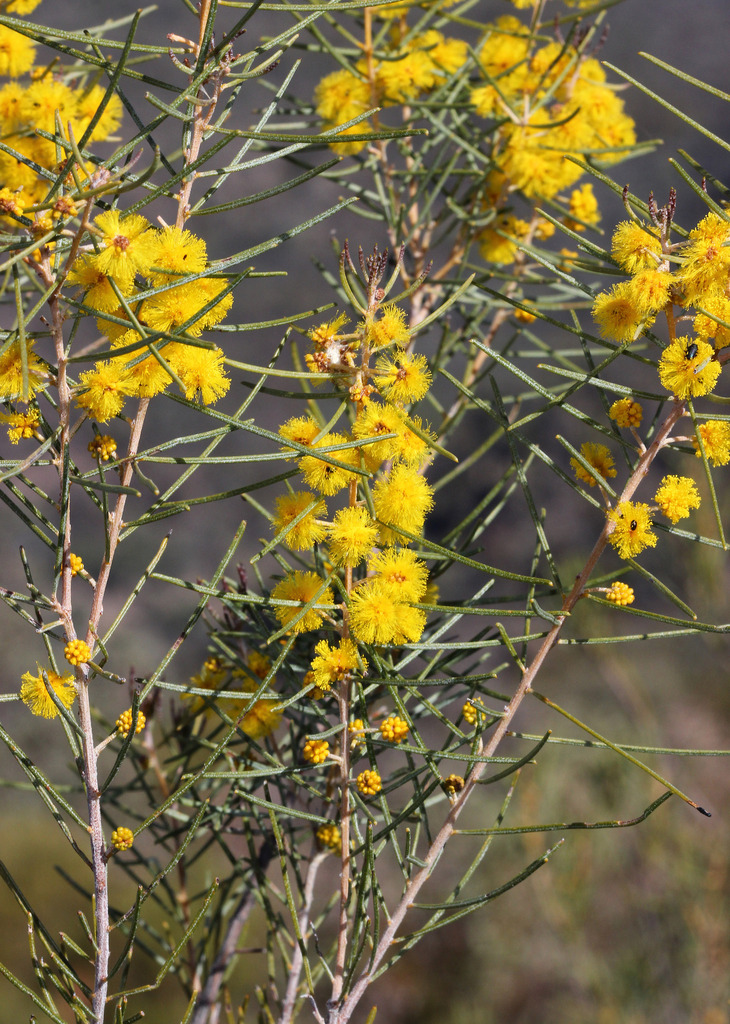
- Near Torrington

Scientific classification
- Kingdom: Plantae
- Clade: Tracheophytes
- Clade: Angiosperms
- Clade: Eudicots
- Clade: Rosids
- Order: Fabales
- Family: Fabaceae
- Subfamily: Caesalpinioideae
- Clade: Mimosoid clade
- Genus: Acacia
- Species: A. burbidgeae

Binomial name
- Acacia burbidgeae Pedley
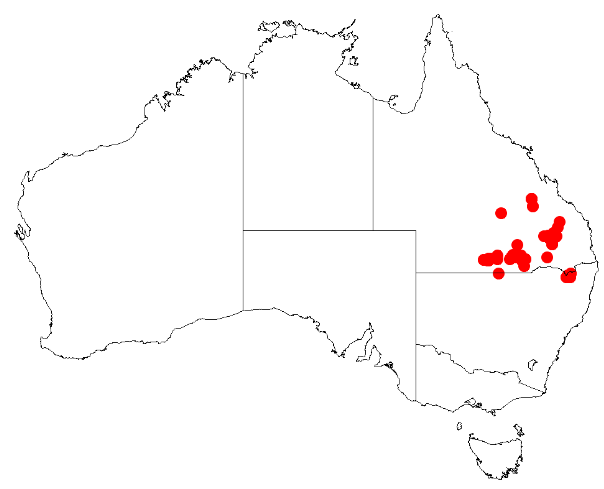
- Occurrence data from AVH

Synonyms
- Racosperma burbidgeae (Pedley) Pedley

= Acacia burbidgeae =

Burbidge's wattle

Species of legume

Acacia burbidgeae, commonly known as Burbidge's wattle, is a species of flowering plant in the family Fabaceae and is endemic to eastern Australia. It is an erect or spreading shrub with whorled or clustered, straight to slightly curved phyllodes, cylindrical heads of bright yellow flowers, and linear, firmly papery brown pods.

== Description ==
Acacia burbidgeae is an erect or spreading shrub that typically grows to a height of 2–4 m (6 ft 7 in – 13 ft 1 in) and has branches that are usually hairy and slight sticky. The phyllodes are whorled to clustered, straight to slightly curved and circular in cross-section, 20–45 mm (0.79–1.77 in) long and 0.5–1 mm (0.020–0.039 in) wide with a longitudinal groove on each surface. The flowers are borne in single spherical heads on a peduncle 3–6 mm (0.12–0.24 in) long, each head with 20 to 30 golden-yellow flowers. Flowering occurs from June to October and the pods are linear, firmly papery, glabrous and brown, up to 65 mm (2.6 in) long and 3–4.5 mm (0.12–0.18 in) wide with oblong seeds 3.5–4 mm (0.14–0.16 in) long.

== Taxonomy ==
Acacia burbidgeae was first formally described by the botanist Leslie Pedley in 1979 in the journal Austrobaileya from specimens collected by Nancy Tyson Burbidge 15 mi (24 km) west of St George in 1965. The specific epithet honours the collector of the type specimens.

A. burbidgeae belongs to the Acacia johnsonii group and is most closely related to A. johnsonii, Acacia pilligaensis and Acacia islana.

== Distribution ==
Burbidge's wattle is found in north eastern parts of New South Wales around Emmaville and to the south of Torrington and extending into south eastern parts of Queensland where it is a part of dry sclerophyll forests growing in sandy granitic soils. In Queensland its range extends from Cunnamulla in the west to St George in the east and Chinchilla in the north.

== Conservation status ==
Acacia burbidgeae is listed as of "least concern" under the Queensland Government Nature Conservation Act 1992.

== See also ==
- List of Acacia species
