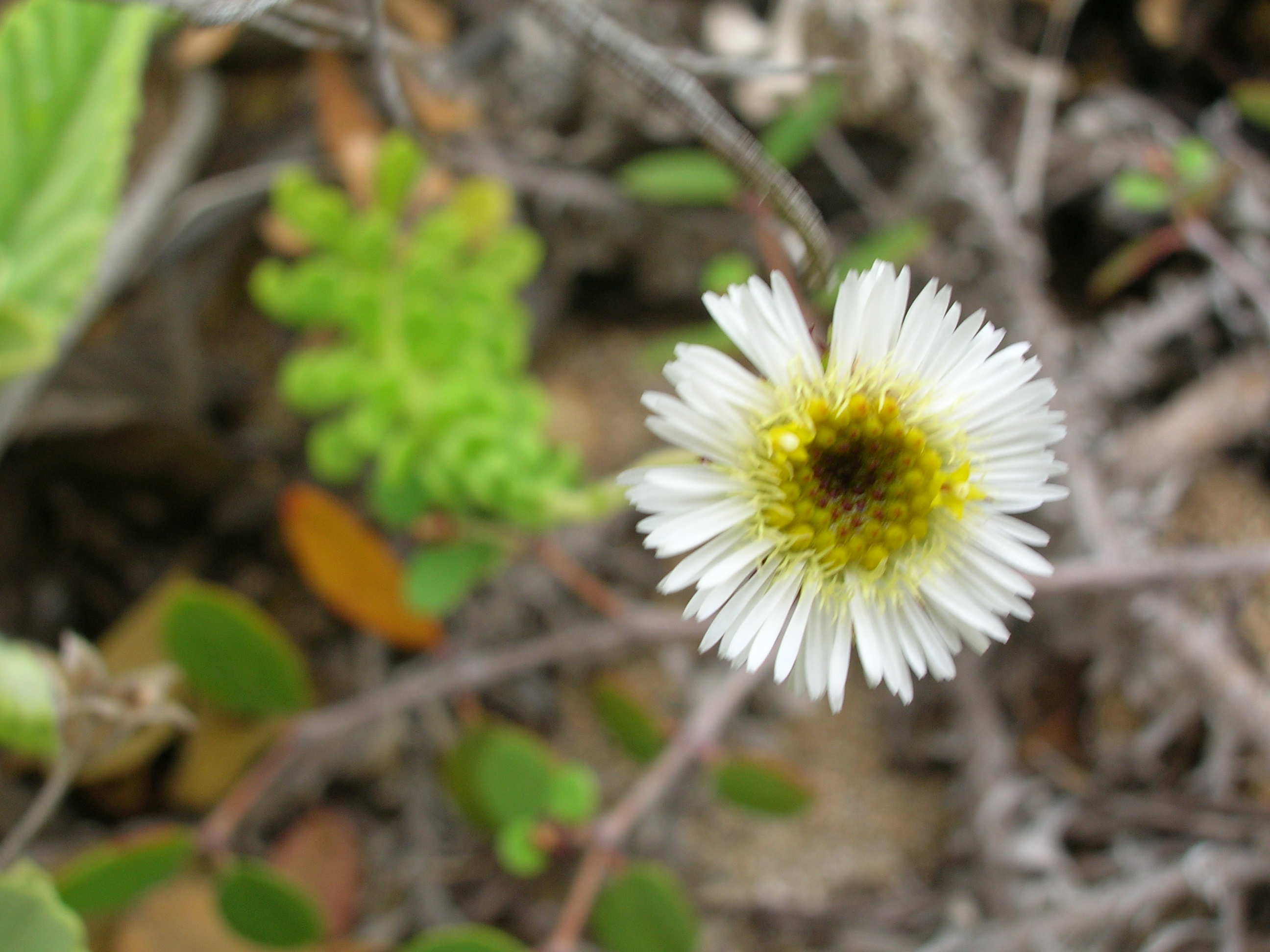

Conservation status
- Critically Imperiled (NatureServe)

Scientific classification
- Kingdom: Plantae
- Clade: Tracheophytes
- Clade: Angiosperms
- Clade: Eudicots
- Clade: Asterids
- Order: Asterales
- Family: Asteraceae
- Genus: Tetramolopium
- Species: T. rockii

Binomial name
- Tetramolopium rockii Sherff

= Tetramolopium rockii =

Species of plant

Tetramolopium rockii is a rare species of flowering plant in the family Asteraceae known by the common name dune tetramolopium. It is endemic to Hawaii, where it is known only from the island of Molokai. It is threatened by habitat destruction and degradation caused by deer, cattle, introduced species of plants, and off road vehicles. It is a federally listed threatened of the United States.

This plant is a small, mat-forming shrub growing no more than about 10 centimeters tall. The inflorescence contains a single flower head. The plant grows in shrublands on sand dunes. It is present only on a six-kilometer strip of habitat on the Molokai coastline.
