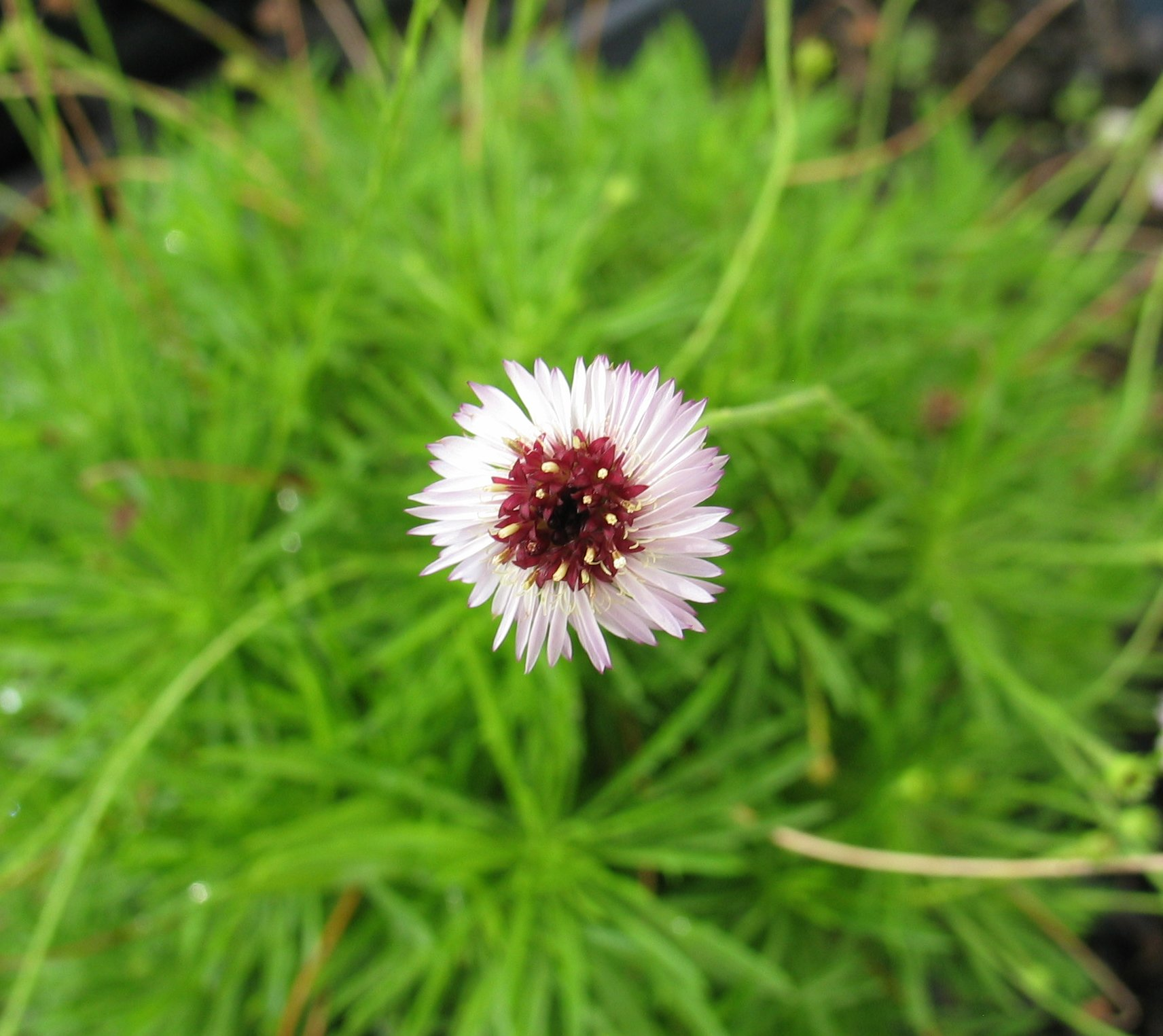
- Tetramolopium filiforme var. polyphyllum

Conservation status
- Critically Imperiled (NatureServe)

Scientific classification
- Kingdom: Plantae
- Clade: Tracheophytes
- Clade: Angiosperms
- Clade: Eudicots
- Clade: Asterids
- Order: Asterales
- Family: Asteraceae
- Genus: Tetramolopium
- Species: T. filiforme

Binomial name
- Tetramolopium filiforme Sherff

= Tetramolopium filiforme =

Species of plant

Tetramolopium filiforme is a rare species of flowering plant in the family Asteraceae known by the common name ridgetop tetramolopium. It is endemic to Hawaii, where it is known only from the Waiʻanae Range on the island of Oahu. It is threatened by habitat degradation caused by feral goats and introduced species of plants. It is a federally listed endangered species of the United States.

This plant is a very small shrub growing only 15 centimeters in maximum height. It produces narrow leaves and inflorescences of up to 4 flower heads. It grows on mountain ridges and cliffs. It sometimes grows in rock cracks on steep cliffs.

There are six known populations of this plant, totalling 2857 mature individuals and 625 juveniles. There are two varieties of this species, var. filiforme and var. polyphyllum, which differ in the shape of the leaves.
