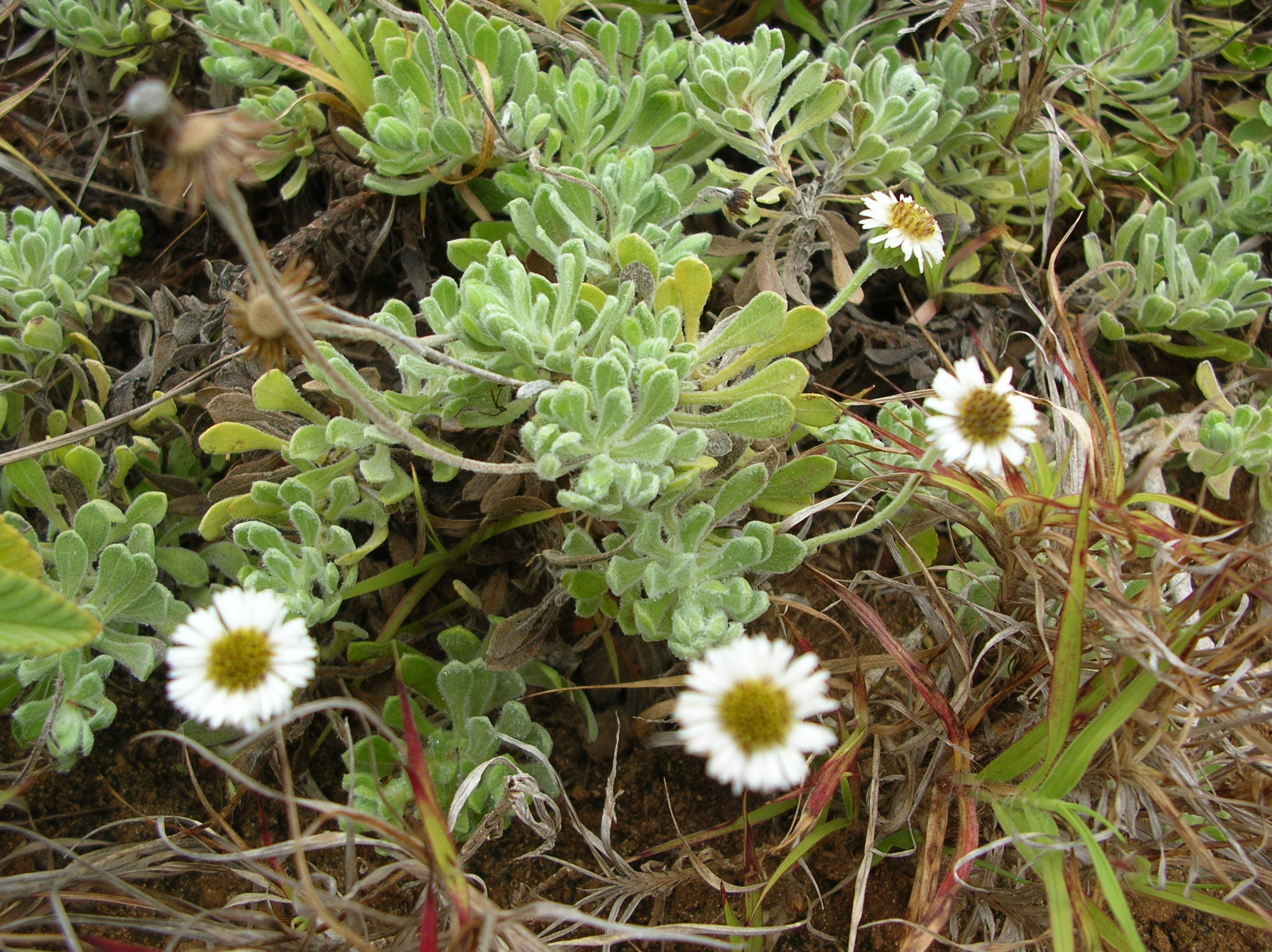
- Tetramolopium rockii

Scientific classification
- Kingdom: Plantae
- Clade: Tracheophytes
- Clade: Angiosperms
- Clade: Eudicots
- Clade: Asterids
- Order: Asterales
- Family: Asteraceae
- Subfamily: Asteroideae
- Tribe: Astereae
- Subtribe: Brachyscominae
- Genus: Tetramolopium; Nees

Synonyms
- Vittadinia sect. Tetramolopium (Nees) A.Gray; Luteidiscus H.St.John

= Tetramolopium =

Genus of plants

Tetramolopium is a genus of plants in the tribe Astereae within the family Asteraceae.

Most of the species are native to New Guinea, 11 species are found in Hawaii, and one in the Cook Islands, with the island populations apparently representing a recent (by evolutionary standards) colonization. It is related to Camptacra, Kippistia, Minuria, Peripleura, and Vittadinia all of which are from Australia, New Guinea, New Zealand, or Pacific islands.

Species

- Tetramolopium alinae
- Tetramolopium arenarium
- Tetramolopium bennettii
- Tetramolopium bicolor
- Tetramolopium capellaense
- Tetramolopium capillare
- Tetramolopium carstenszense
- Tetramolopium chamissonis
- Tetramolopium ciliatum
- Tetramolopium cinereum
- Tetramolopium conyzoides
- Tetramolopium consanguineum
- Tetramolopium conyzoides
- Tetramolopium corallioides
- Tetramolopium crepatutarum
- Tetramolopium distichum
- Tetramolopium ericoides
- Tetramolopium fasciculatum
- Tetramolopium filiforme
- Tetramolopium flaccidum
- Tetramolopium humile
- Tetramolopium klossii
- Tetramolopium lanatum
- Tetramolopium lepidotum
- Tetramolopium macrum
- Tetramolopium mitiaroense
- Tetramolopium piloso-villosum
- Tetramolopium pioraense
- Tetramolopium procumbens
- Tetramolopium prostratum
- Tetramolopium pumilum
- Tetramolopium remyi
- Tetramolopium rockii
- Tetramolopium spathulatum
- Tetramolopium sylvae
- Tetramolopium tenerrimum
- Tetramolopium tenue
- Tetramolopium vagans
- Tetramolopium virgatum
- Tetramolopium wilhelminae

formerly included

see Diplostephium

- Tetramolopium ochraceum - Diplostephium ochraceum
- Tetramolopium phylicoides - Diplostephium phylicoides
- Tetramolopium rupestre - Diplostephium rupestre
