= Tetramolopium remyi =

Conservation status
- Critically Imperiled (NatureServe)

Scientific classification
- Kingdom: Plantae
- Clade: Tracheophytes
- Clade: Angiosperms
- Clade: Eudicots
- Clade: Asterids
- Order: Asterales
- Family: Asteraceae
- Genus: Tetramolopium
- Species: T. remyi

Binomial name
- Tetramolopium remyi (A.Gray) Hillebr.

Species of plant

Tetramolopium remyi is a rare species of flowering plant in the family Asteraceae known by the common names Awalua Ridge tetramolopium and Remy's tetramolopium. It is endemic to Hawaii, where today it is known only from the island of Lanai. It is believed to be extirpated on the island of Maui, having not been observed there since 1944. It is threatened by habitat degradation caused by deer, Mouflon, and introduced species of plants. It is a federally listed endangered species of the United States.

This plant is an erect or reclining shrub growing up to about 40 centimeters in maximum height. The leaves, measuring up to 3.5 centimeters in length, are narrow and stiff and have rolled edges. The inflorescence contains a single flower head. At up to 1.5 centimeters wide, the heads of this species are the largest of any in genus Tetramolopium. They contain many white ray florets and yellow disc florets.
