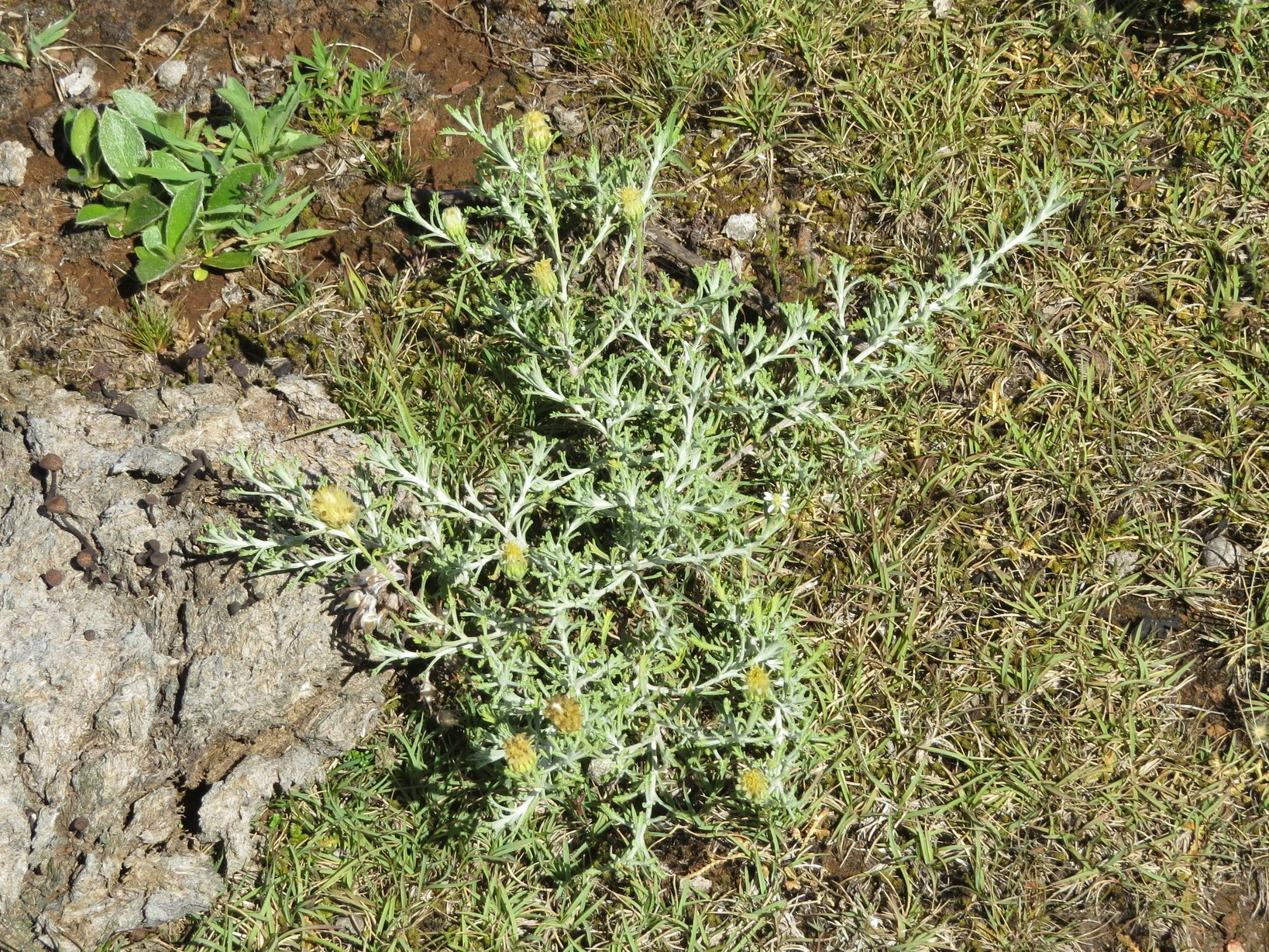
- Microgyne marchesiana

Scientific classification
- Kingdom: Plantae
- Clade: Tracheophytes
- Clade: Angiosperms
- Clade: Eudicots
- Clade: Asterids
- Order: Asterales
- Family: Asteraceae
- Subfamily: Asteroideae
- Tribe: Astereae
- Subtribe: Baccharidinae
- Genus: Microgyne; Cass.

Synonyms
- Microgynella Grau

= Microgyne =

Genus of plants

Microgyne is a genus of flowering plants belonging to the family Asteraceae. The native range if the species in the genus is from Uruguay and Argentina.

== Species ==
The following two species are recognised in the genus Microgyne:

- Microgyne marchesiana Bonif. & G.Sancho
- Microgyne trifurcata Less.
