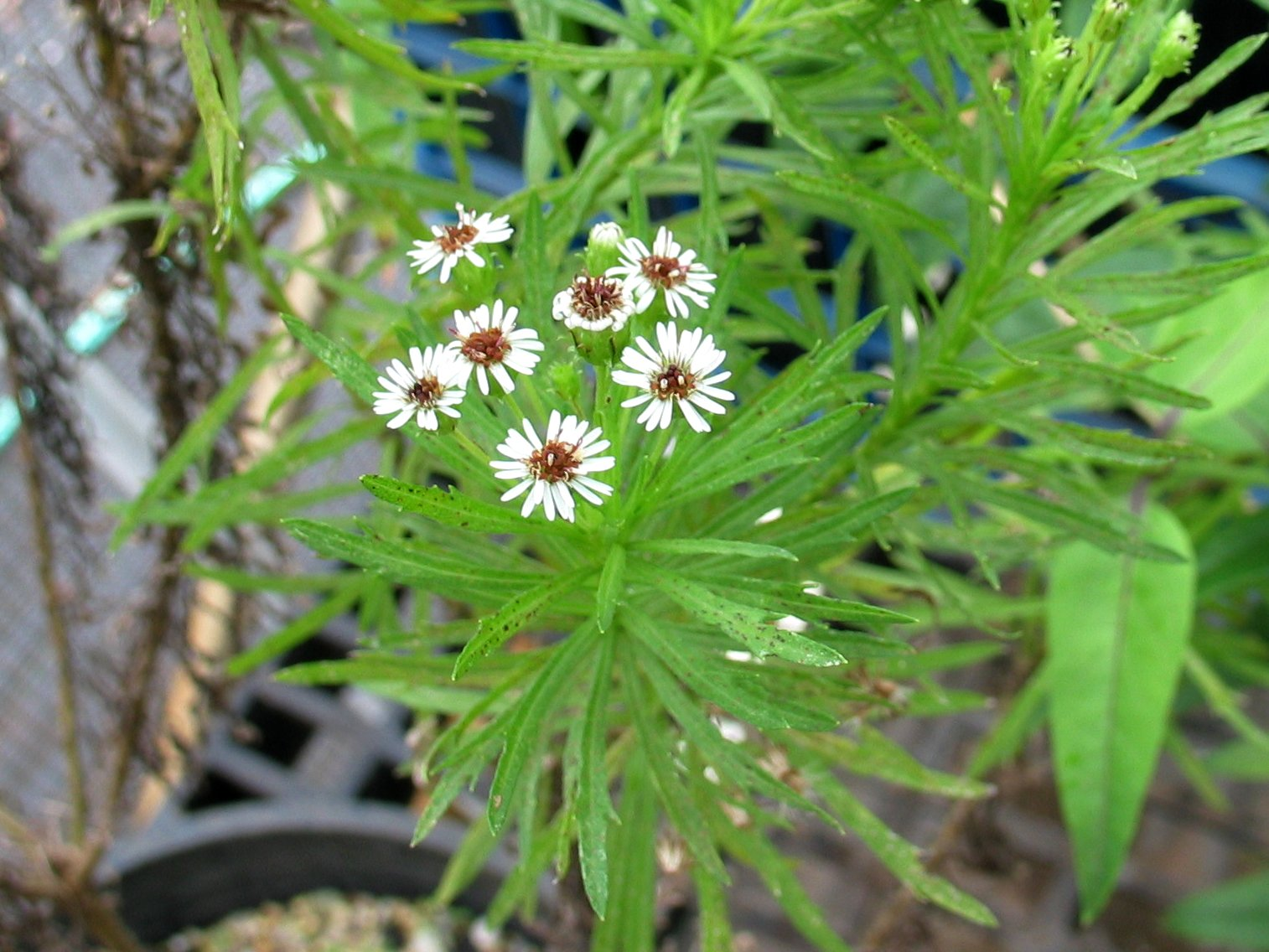

Conservation status
- Critically Imperiled (NatureServe)

Scientific classification
- Kingdom: Plantae
- Clade: Tracheophytes
- Clade: Angiosperms
- Clade: Eudicots
- Clade: Asterids
- Order: Asterales
- Family: Asteraceae
- Genus: Tetramolopium
- Species: T. lepidotum

Binomial name
- Tetramolopium lepidotum (Less.) Sherff

= Tetramolopium lepidotum =

Species of plant

Tetramolopium lepidotum is a rare species of flowering plant in the family Asteraceae known by the common name Waianae Range tetramolopium. It is endemic to Hawaii, where today it is known only from the Waiʻanae Range on the island of Oahu. It is threatened by habitat degradation caused by feral goats and pigs and introduced species of plants.

There are two subspecies:

- Tetramolopium lepidotum ssp. arbusculum has not been seen since the type specimen was collected in 1844 in Maui.
- Tetramolopium lepidotum ssp. lepidotum is limited to the Waiʻanae Range on Oahu. It was once known from the island of Lanai but it has not been found there since 1928. There is only a single population made up of 250 individuals. This subspecies is treated as a federally listed endangered species of the United States.

This plant is a small, erect shrub growing up to 36 centimeters in maximum height. The leaves vary in shape from threadlike to linear to lance-shaped and measure up to 5 centimeters long. The inflorescence contains up to 12 flower heads. Each head contains white or purple-tinged ray florets and reddish disc florets.
