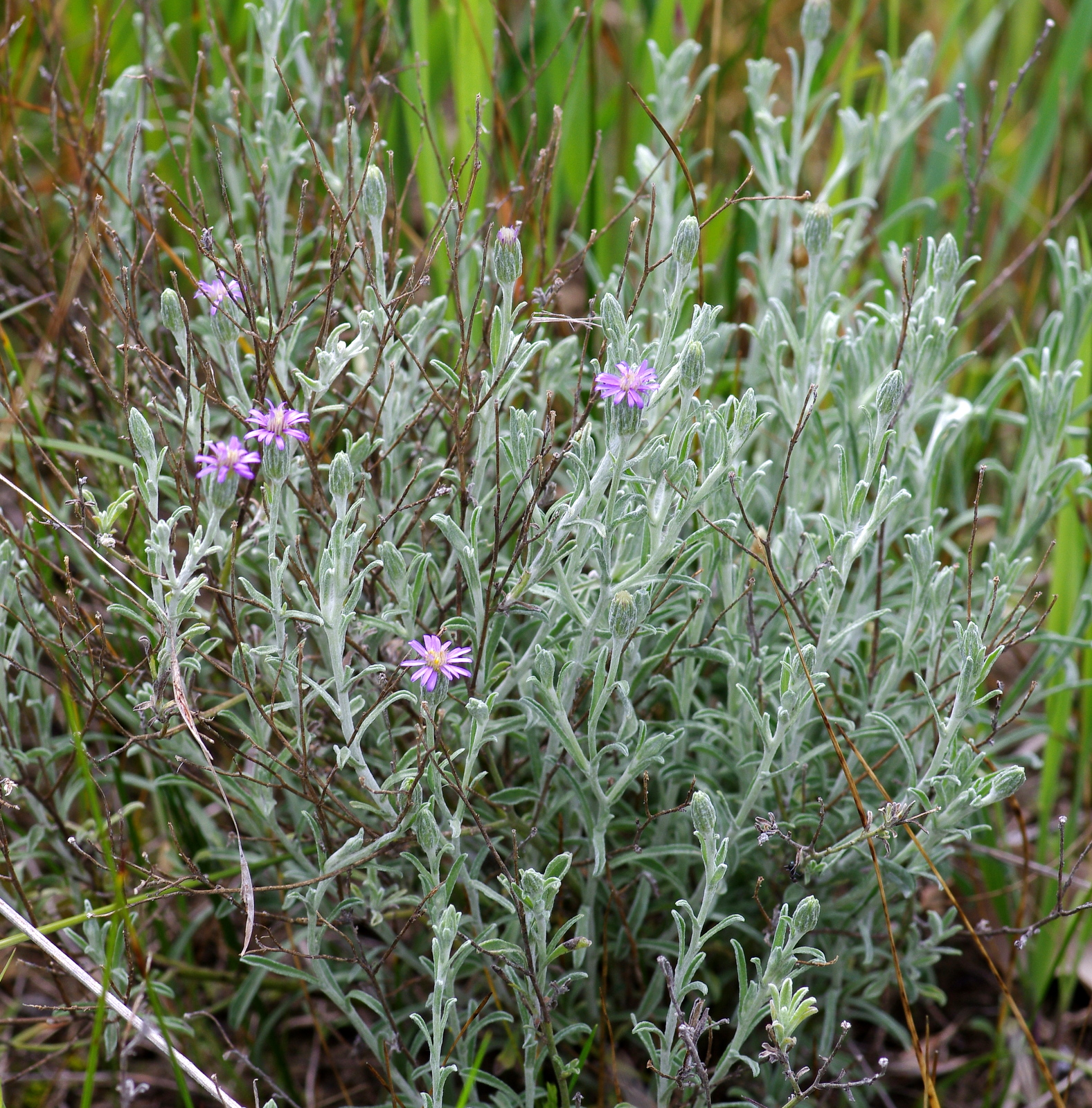

Scientific classification
- Kingdom: Plantae
- Clade: Tracheophytes
- Clade: Angiosperms
- Clade: Eudicots
- Clade: Asterids
- Order: Asterales
- Family: Asteraceae
- Genus: Vittadinia
- Species: V. gracilis

Binomial name
- Vittadinia gracilis (Hook.f.) N.T.Burb.

Synonyms
- Vittadinia cervicularis N.T.Burb.; Vittadinia sp. E

= Vittadinia gracilis =

Woolly New Holland daisy

Species of plant

Vittadinia gracilis, known by the common name woolly New Holland daisy, is a perennial shrub mostly seen in the southern parts of Australia. It is a member of the family Asteraceae. A small plant, 10 to 40 cm high with erect stems. Leaves are flat or folded on the centre, linear to narrow lanceolate or spathulate, 10 to 40 mm long, 2 to 7 mm wide. Stems form annually from a woody base with a coating of dense, fine white hairs, less often seen on the leaves. The specific epithet gracilis is derived from the Latin adjective gracilis ("slender", "thin", or "graceful").
