= Australothis tertia =

Scientific classification
- Domain: Eukaryota
- Kingdom: Animalia
- Phylum: Arthropoda
- Class: Insecta
- Order: Lepidoptera
- Superfamily: Noctuoidea
- Family: Noctuidae
- Genus: Australothis
- Species: A. tertia

Binomial name
- Australothis tertia (Roepke, 1941)

Synonyms
- Heliothis tertia Roepke, 1941

Species of moth

Australothis tertia is a species of moth of the family Noctuidae. It is found in Queensland and on Java and Sumatra.
