= Nancy Tyson Burbidge =

Australian botanist, conservationist and herbarium curator

Nancy Tyson Burbidge AM
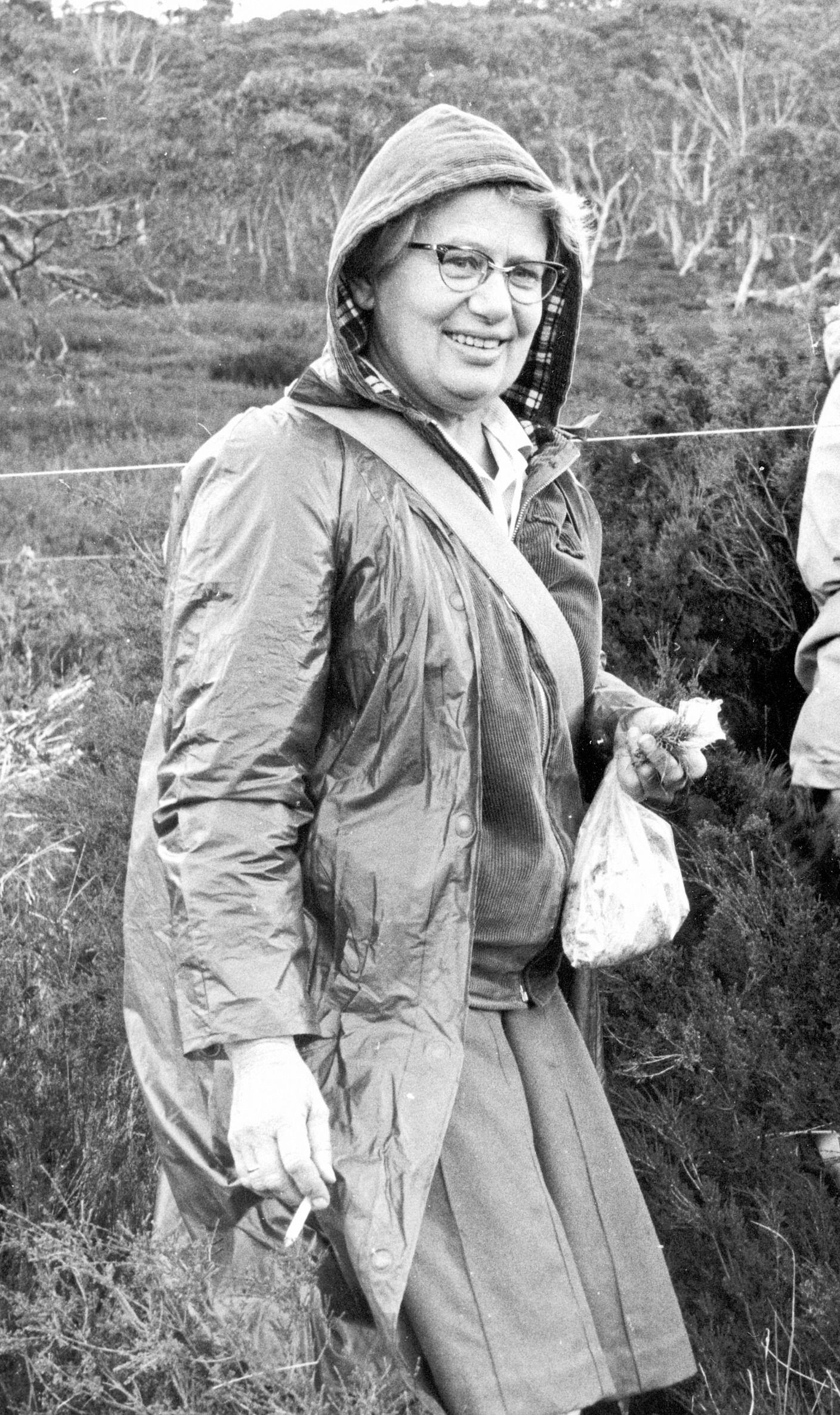
- Born: 5 August 1912; Cleckheaton, Yorkshire, England
- Died: 4 March 1977 (aged 64); Canberra, Australia
- Education: University of Western Australia
- Scientific career
- Fields: Botany

Nancy Tyson Burbidge AM (5 August 1912 – 4 March 1977) was an Australian systemic botanist, conservationist and herbarium curator.

== Early life and training ==
Burbidge was born in Cleckheaton, Yorkshire. Her father, William Burbidge, was the son of the Rev. Edward Burbidge of Backwell, and graduated B.A. from Emmanuel College, Cambridge, in 1892. Following his father as a cleric, he was ordained deacon in the Church of England in 1897, and priest in 1898. He was a curate in Leeds from 1897 to 1900, then for five years was with the Bush Brotherhood in Longreach, Queensland. Returning to England, he married in 1906 Mary Eleanor Simmonds. She was the daughter of Alexander Hague Simmonds of Burnt Ash Hill, Lee, London, and his wife Hannah Tyson of Baltimore, a granddaughter of Nathan Tyson and Martha Ellicott Tyson.

Mary Simmonds was educated at Newnham College from 1897 to 1900. She taught at a school in Sydney from 1900 to 1904, and at the City of London School for Girls 1904–5. Vicar at Cleckheaton from 1906 to 1913, William Burbidge immigrated with his family to Australia in 1913 when he was appointed to a parish at Katanning, Western Australia.

Nancy Burbidge was educated at Katanning (Kobeelya) Church of England Girls' School, founded by her mother in 1917. She completed her schooling in 1922 when she graduated from Bunbury Senior High School, and went on to study at the University of Western Australia. She completed her BSc in 1937, and afterwards received a prize to travel to England, where she spent 18 months at the Royal Botanic Gardens Kew. While at Kew she worked on a revision of the Australian grass genus Enneapogon. When Nancy returned to Australia she continued her study of Australian plants through the University of Western Australia, completing her MSc. in 1945.

== Career ==
In 1943, Burbidge was appointed assistant agronomist at the Waite Agricultural Research Institute in Adelaide, where she started working on native pasture species for arid and semi-arid South Australia. She was appointed to the new position of systematic botanist at the CSIRO Division of Plant Industry, Canberra in 1946. At CSIRO, she worked on organising and extending the herbarium, first as a research scientist and then as curator and was responsible for laying the foundations of the Herbarium Australiense, later the National Australian Herbarium. She wrote Key to the South Australian species of Eucalyptus L'Hér. but had not specialised on the genus. Her professional interest in systemic botany was reflected by her tenure as secretary of the systematic botany committee of the Australian and New Zealand Association for the Advancement of Science from 1948 to 1952. She also edited Australasian Herbarium News until her until 1953, when she took a years leave to be the Australian Botanical Liaison Officer at the Kew Gardens herbarium. While at Kew she photographed and indexed type specimens of Australian plants and made microfilm copies of Robert Brown's notebooks for Australian herbaria.

When she returned to Australia in 1954 she began a very productive period of her career. She wrote an extensive paper "The phytogeography of the Australian region" which was published in the Australian Journal of Botany in 1960 and contributed to the award of her DSc by the University of Western Australia in 1961. Her Dictionary of Australian Plant Genera was published in 1963, and she completed studies of the plant groups Nicotiana, Sesbania and Helichrysum. Many of her publications included her own drawings. After resigning her position as curator of the herbarium she went on to be heavily involved in the development of the Flora of Australia series, directing the project from 1973 to 1977. In addition to her books, she also wrote over 50 papers on phytogeography, ecology, botanical history and Australian plant genera. For her contributions to botany she was awarded the 1971 Clarke Medal for her achievements in taxonomic botany and ecology by the Royal Society of New South Wales and made a member of the Order of Australia in 1976.

Burbidge was also interested in conservation. She was a founding member of the National Parks Association of the Australian Capital Territory in 1960, and twice served as its president. She was prominent in the lobbying for the establishment of national parks in the ACT including Tidbinbilla Nature Reserve and Namadgi National Park; both of which were established following her death. She was also a member of the Australian Federation of University Women, serving as president of the Canberra branch from 1959 to 1961, of the Pan-Pacific and South East Asia Women's Association from 1957 to 1958 and as international secretary between 1961 and 1968.

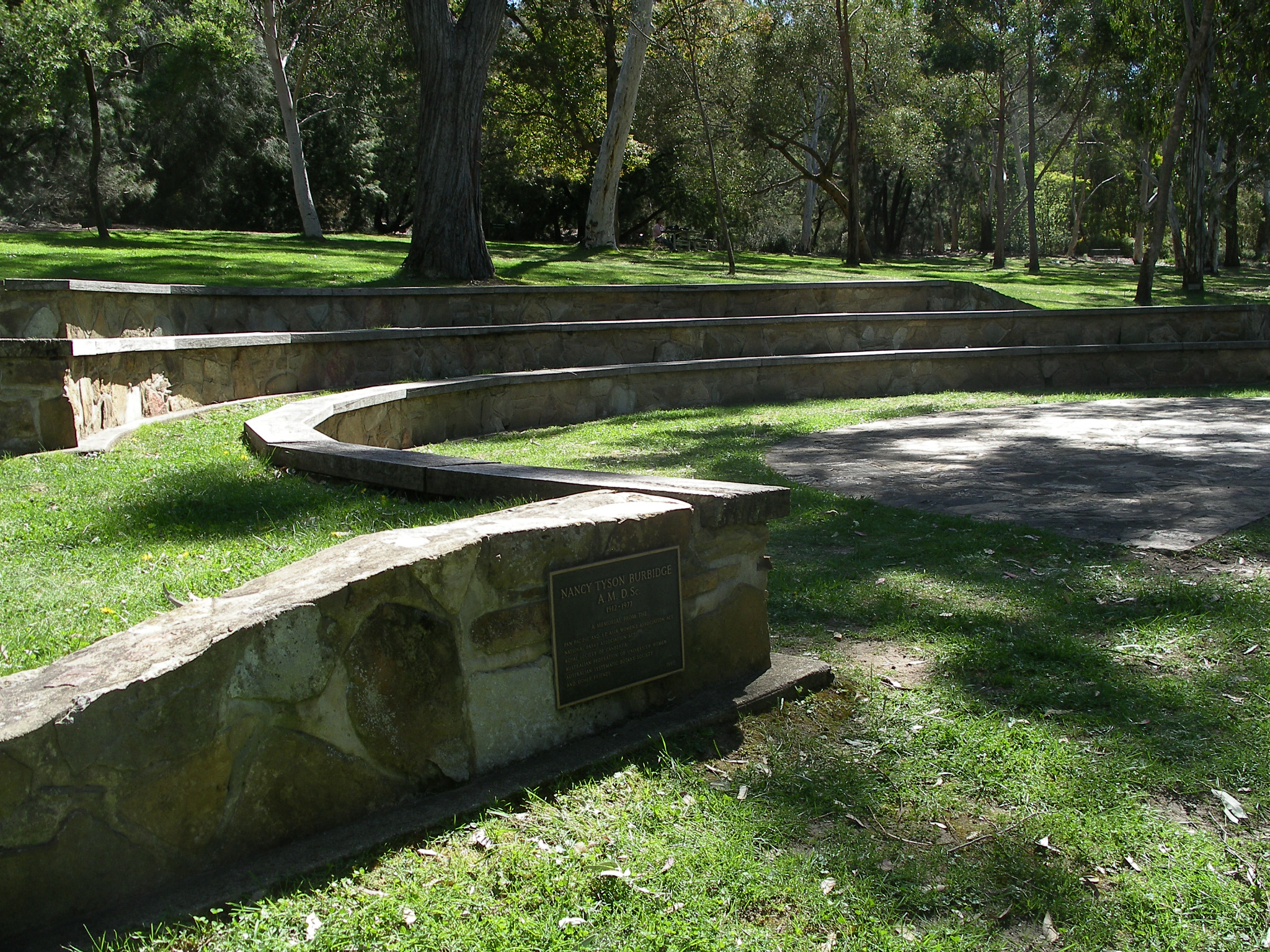
Nancy T. Burbidge Memorial amphitheatre

== Recognition ==
For her contributions to botany Burbidge was awarded the 1971 Clarke Medal for her achievements in taxonomic botany and ecology by the Royal Society of New South Wales and made a member of the Order of Australia in 1976.

Burbidge's contributions are commemorated by an altar-frontal, showing banksias and honey-eaters, in St Michael's Anglican Church, Mount Pleasant, Western Australia, and by the Nancy T. Burbidge Memorial, an amphitheatre in the Australian National Botanic Gardens in Canberra. The Australian Plant Name Index is dedicated to her memory and a peak in Namadgi National Park is named Mount Burbidge in her honour. Acacia burbidgeae also known as Burbidge's wattle is also named in her honour.

The "Nancy T. Burbidge Medal" has been presented annually since 2001 by the Australasian Systematic Botany Society, for longstanding and significant contributions to taxonomic and systematic botanical work in Australasia, and the recipient delivers the Nancy T. Burbidge Memorial Lecture at the Society's annual conference. Recipients include Patrick Brownsey and Phil Garnock-Jones.

The Australian National Herbarium holds over 7,000 specimens collected by Burbidge. Other herbaria in Australia holding her collections include Western Australian Herbarium, National Herbarium of New South Wales, Tasmanian Herbarium, State Herbarium of South Australia, Queensland Herbarium, Northern Territory Herbarium.

== Standard author abbreviation ==
The standard author abbreviation N.T.Burb is used to indicate this person as the author when citing a botanical name.

== Publications ==
- The Wattles of the Australian Capital Territory (1961)
- Dictionary of Australian Plant Genera: Gymnosperms and Angiosperms (1963) LCCN 65-87091
- Australian Grasses, 2 volumes (1966–1970) ISBN 0-207-95263-9
- Flora of the Australian Capital Territory with Max Gray (1970) ISBN 0-7081-0073-2
- Plant Taxonomic Literature in Australian Libraries (1978) ISBN 0-643-00286-3

Awards
Preceded by Gilbert Percy Whitley	Clarke Medal; 1971	Succeeded by Haddon King
