= Aster divaricatus =

Aster divaricatus may refer to:

- Most often, when written Aster divaricatus L., the basionym for Eurybia divaricata

Less often:

- A synonym, when written Aster divaricatus (Nutt.) Torr. & A.Gray, for Symphyotrichum divaricatum
- A synonym, when written Aster divaricatus Raf. ex DC., for Symphyotrichum lateriflorum
- A synonym, when written Aster divaricatus Lam., for Oclemena acuminata
- A synonym, when written Aster divaricatus Spreng., for Doellingeria umbellata
- A synonym (nom. illeg.), when written Aster divaricatus (Nutt.) Kuntze, for Croptilon divaricatum
