= Coleophora nemorella =

Scientific classification
- Kingdom: Animalia
- Phylum: Arthropoda
- Clade: Pancrustacea
- Class: Insecta
- Order: Lepidoptera
- Family: Coleophoridae
- Genus: Coleophora
- Species: C. nemorella

Binomial name
- Coleophora nemorella McDunnough, 1956

Species of moth

Coleophora nemorella is a moth of the family Coleophoridae. It is found in Canada, including Nova Scotia.

The larvae feed on the seeds of Oclemena nemoralis. They create a trivalved, tubular silken case.

== Taxonomy ==
The species was first described by James Halliday McDunnough in 1956.
