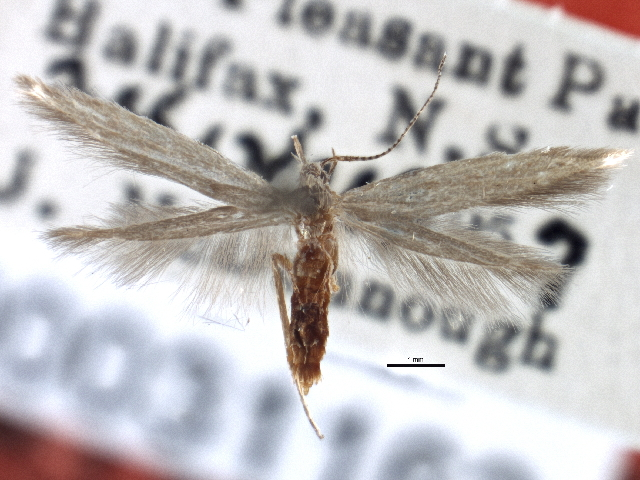

Scientific classification
- Kingdom: Animalia
- Phylum: Arthropoda
- Class: Insecta
- Order: Lepidoptera
- Family: Coleophoridae
- Genus: Coleophora
- Species: C. acuminatoides

Binomial name
- Coleophora acuminatoides McDunnough, 1958

= Coleophora acuminatoides =

Species of moth

Coleophora acuminatoides is a moth of the family Coleophoridae. It is found in Canada, including Nova Scotia.

The larvae feed on the seeds of Aster acuminatus.
