= Aster latifolius =

Aster latifolius is an unaccepted scientific name and may refer to two different species of plants:

- Eurybia macrophylla, the largeleaf aster
- Oclemena acuminata, the whorled wood aster
