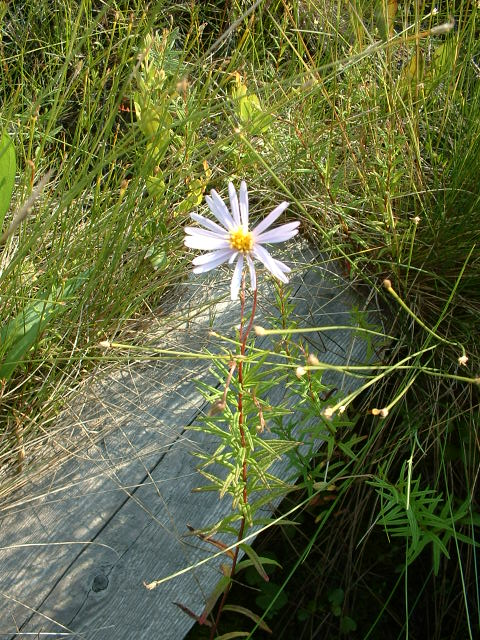
- Oclemena nemoralis (bog aster)

Scientific classification
- Kingdom: Plantae
- Clade: Tracheophytes
- Clade: Angiosperms
- Clade: Eudicots
- Clade: Asterids
- Order: Asterales
- Family: Asteraceae
- Subfamily: Asteroideae
- Tribe: Astereae
- Subtribe: Oclemininae; G.L.Nesom
- Genus: Oclemena; Greene

Synonyms
- Heterotypic synonyms: Aster sect. Nemorali House; Aster sect. Orthomeris (Torr. & A.Gray) Benth. & Hook.f.; Aster subg. Orthomeris (Torr. & A.Gray) A.Gray; Galatella sect. Calianthus Nutt.

= Oclemena =

Genus of flowering plants

Oclemena is a genus of flowering plants in the tribe Astereae within the family Asteraceae. All species in the genus are native to eastern North America. The species were originally included in the genus Aster so they are often referred to simply as asters. Since their flower heads are nodding in bud, they are sometimes called nodding-asters.

== Description ==
Oclemena species are perennial, herbaceous plants that propagate via a swollen tuber at the tip of a slender, elongated rhizome. Stems are erect and unbranched, with dense long hairs. Stem leaves are sessile (or short-petiolate) and alternate. Leaf blades are sparsely dotted with short glandular hairs, each with a yellow to orange resin head. Leaf margins are either serrate (O. acuminata) or both entire and revolute. The inflorescence is either a single flower head (O. nemoralis) or a corymb of 2–46 flower heads on long, slender peduncles, nodding in bud (except O. reticulata). A flower head has 7–25 ray flowers, white or pink, and 14–35 disc flowers, pale or pinkish yellow, reddening at maturity. The chromosome base number is x=9.

	Oclemena acuminata	Oclemena nemoralis	Oclemena reticulata
Plant height	10–80 cm tall	5–70 cm tall	30–90 cm tall
Number of leaves	11–18; Clustered at the summit of the stem	30–100; Uniformly distributed along the stem	12–30; Uniformly distributed along the stem
Leaf blades	10–45 mm wide	1–8 mm wide	10–40 mm wide
Leaf margins	Prominently toothed with flat margins	Entire (or nearly so) and revolute	Entire (or toothed at the tip) and revolute
Flower heads	5–46	1–15	9–40
Ray flowers	15; White or tinged with pink	13–25; Pink to purple, seldom white	7–11; White to pink
Disc flowers	14–30	20–35	15–30
Habitat	Forests	Bogs, fens, mossy lake shores	Seasonally moist sandy places, bogs, wet pine flatwoods

The hybrid Oclemena × blakei is intermediate in appearance between its parents, Oclemena acuminata and Oclemena nemoralis.

== Taxonomy ==
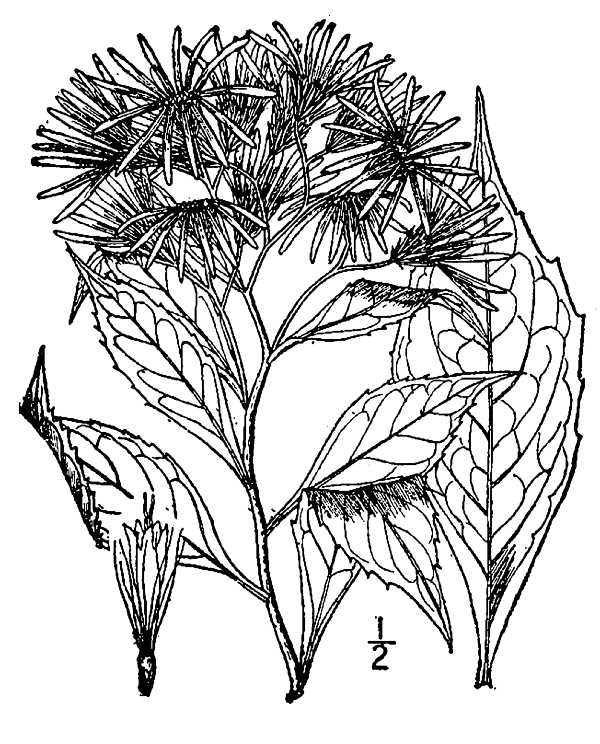
Oclemena acuminata illustrated as Aster acuminatus in 1913

In 1903, the American botanist Edward Lee Greene established genus Oclemena by segregating two species, Aster acuminatus Michx. and Aster nemoralis Aiton. Greene, initially drawn to this group of plants by the nodding habit of their flower heads in bud, had been using the name Oclemena acuminata on the labels of herbarium specimens since 1897. In 1995, the American botanist Guy L. Nesom segregated two additional taxa, Aster nemoralis var. blakei Porter and Aster reticulatus Pursh. Nesom considered Oclemena to be monophyletic but closely related to Doellingeria Nees. A major treatment of genus Oclemena appeared in Flora of North America in 2006:

Scientific name	Common name	Year described	Year published	Distribution
Oclemena acuminata (Michx.) Greene	whorled wood aster	1803	1903	Eastern Canada, Eastern United States
Oclemena × blakei (Porter) G.L.Nesom (O. acuminata × O. nemoralis)	Blake's aster	1894	1995	Eastern Canada, Northeastern United States
Oclemena nemoralis (Aiton) Greene	bog aster	1789	1903	Eastern Canada, Northeastern United States
Oclemena reticulata (Pursh) G.L.Nesom	pinebarren whitetop aster	1813	1995	Southeastern United States

As of December 2025, the generic name Oclemena Greene is widely accepted.

Oclemena belongs to the North American clade of the tribe Astereae, as a basal member of one of its main branches.

== Distribution and habitat ==
Oclemena species are native to eastern North America. Oclemena acuminata is the most wide-ranging species, from the Appalachian Uplands of Newfoundland to the southern tip of the Appalachian Mountains in the U.S. state of Georgia. In contrast, Oclemena reticulata îs restricted to the extreme southeastern United States where other species of Oclemena are not found. Oclemena nemoralis and Oclemena × blakei are boreal species that prefer the cold acidic bogs of eastern Canada and northeastern United States.

== Gallery ==
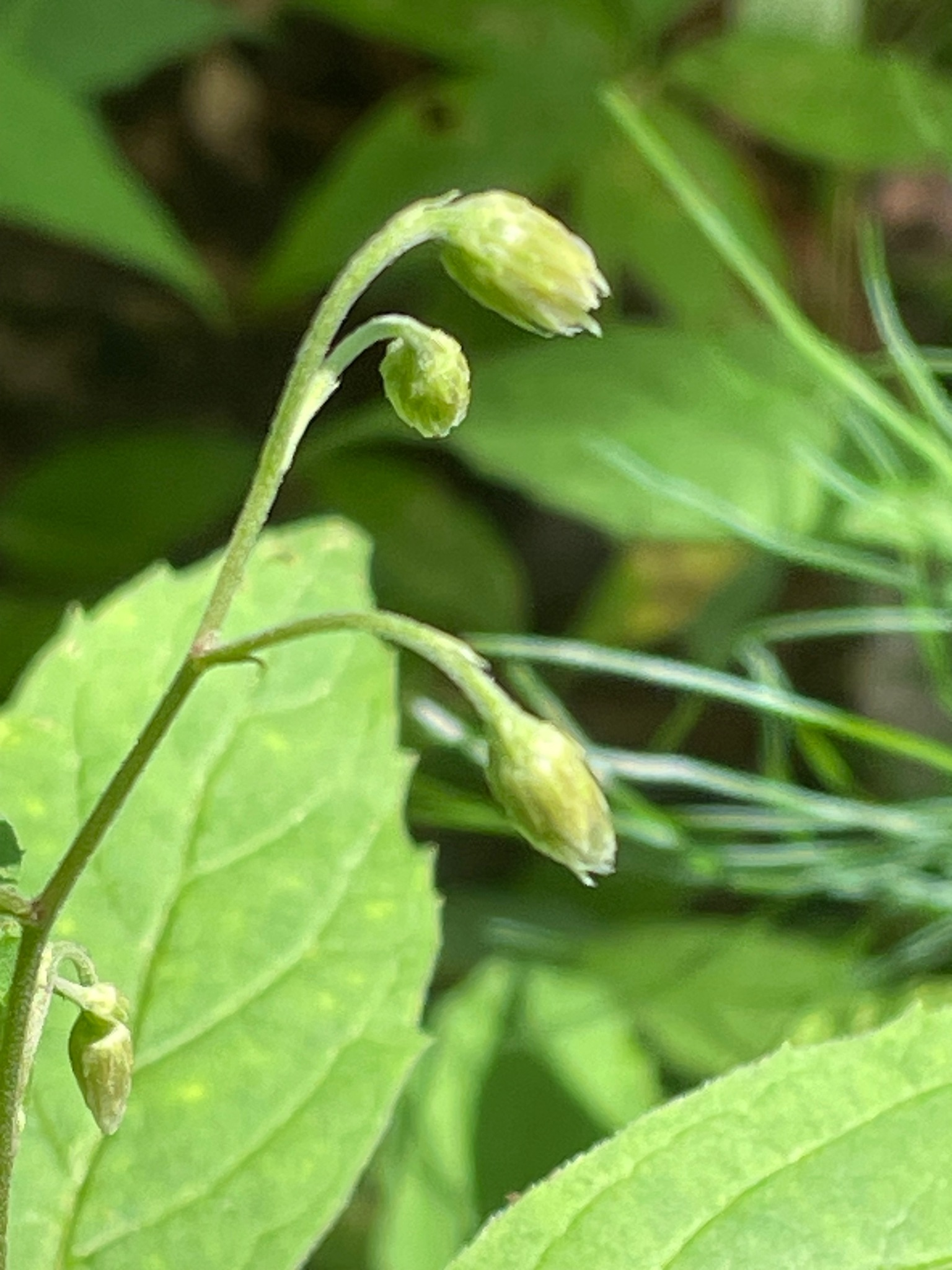
Oclemena acuminata with nodding flower buds (July)

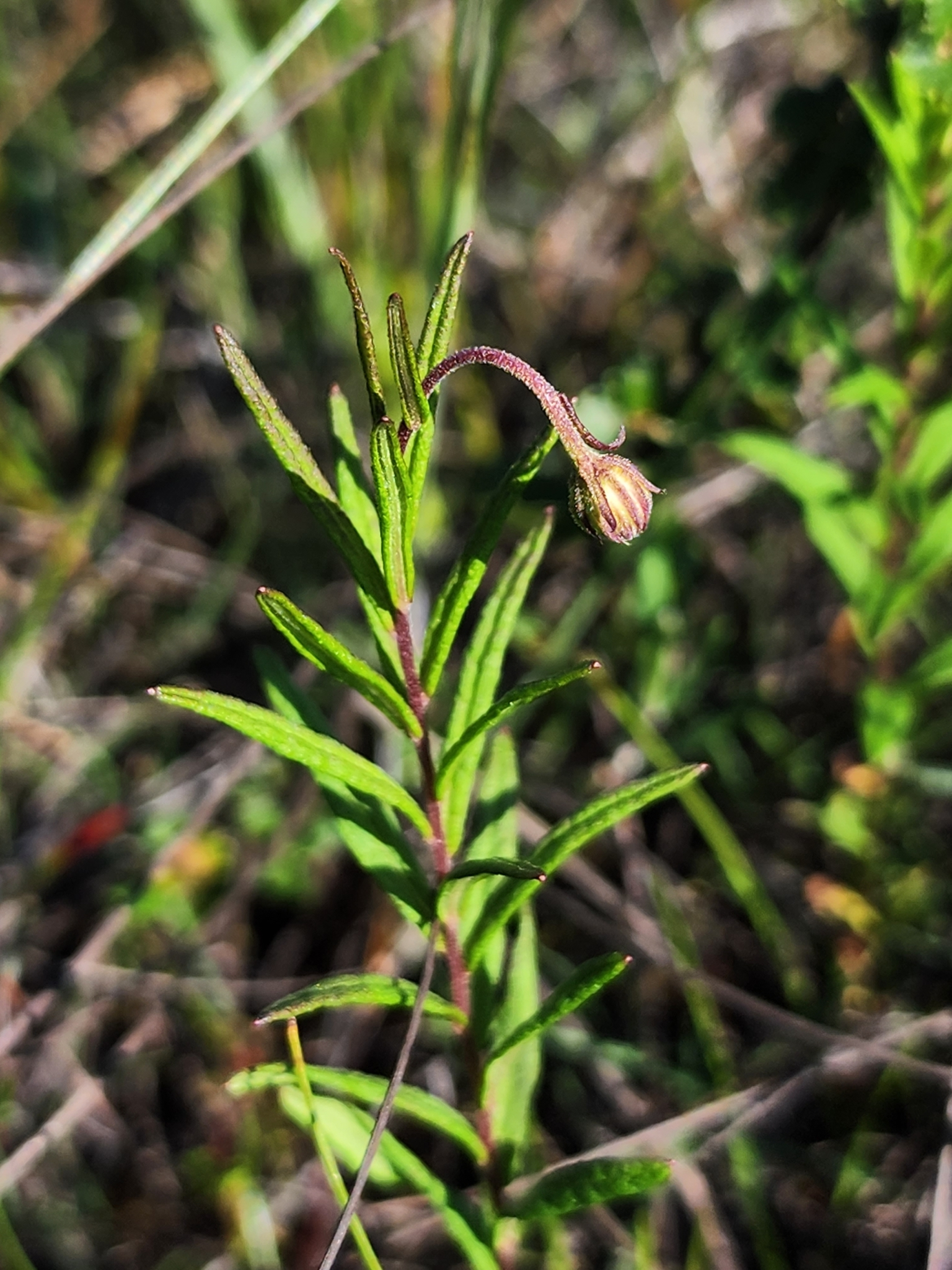
Oclemena nemoralis with nodding flower bud (July)

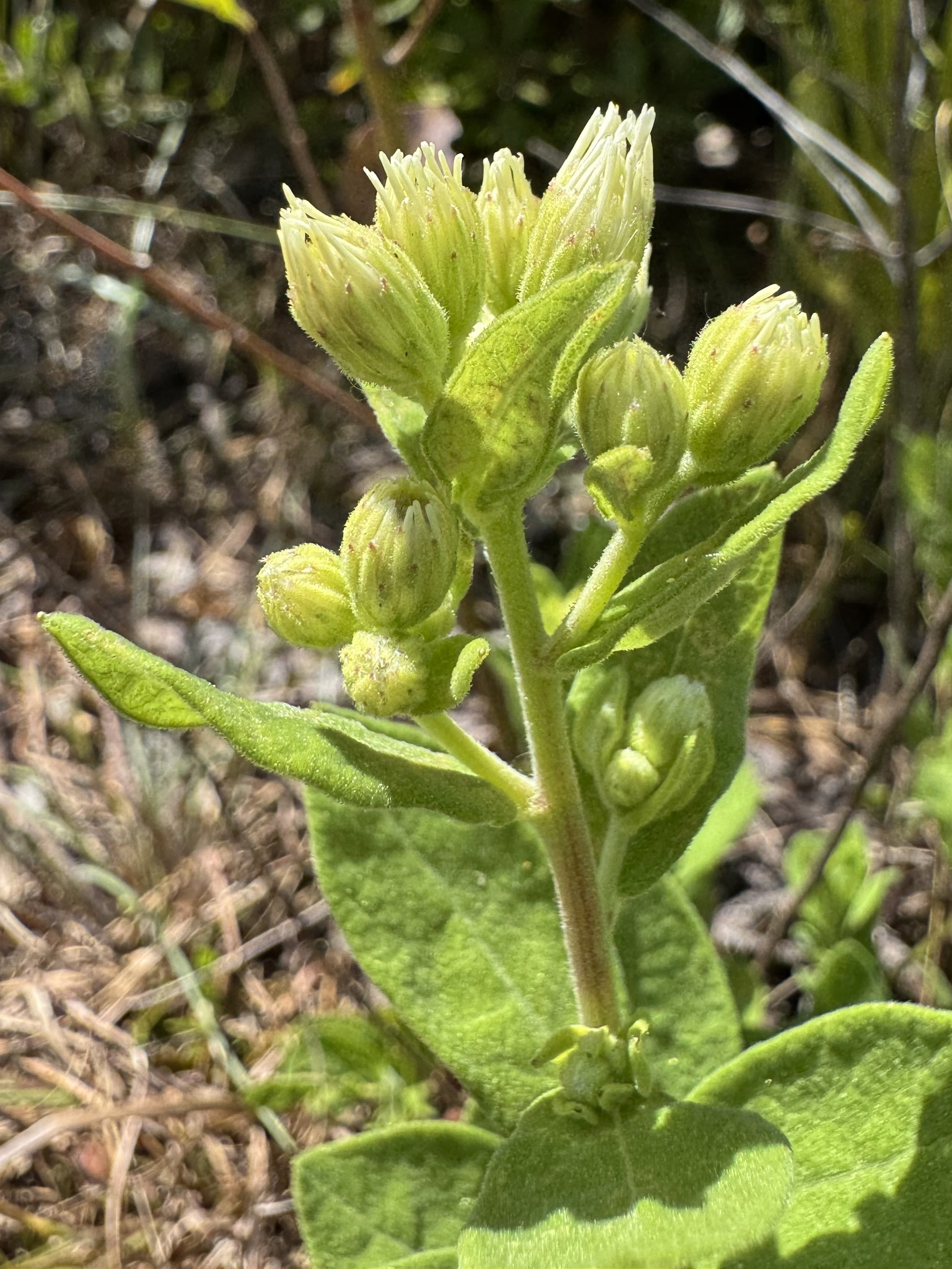
Oclemena reticulata with flower buds (March)

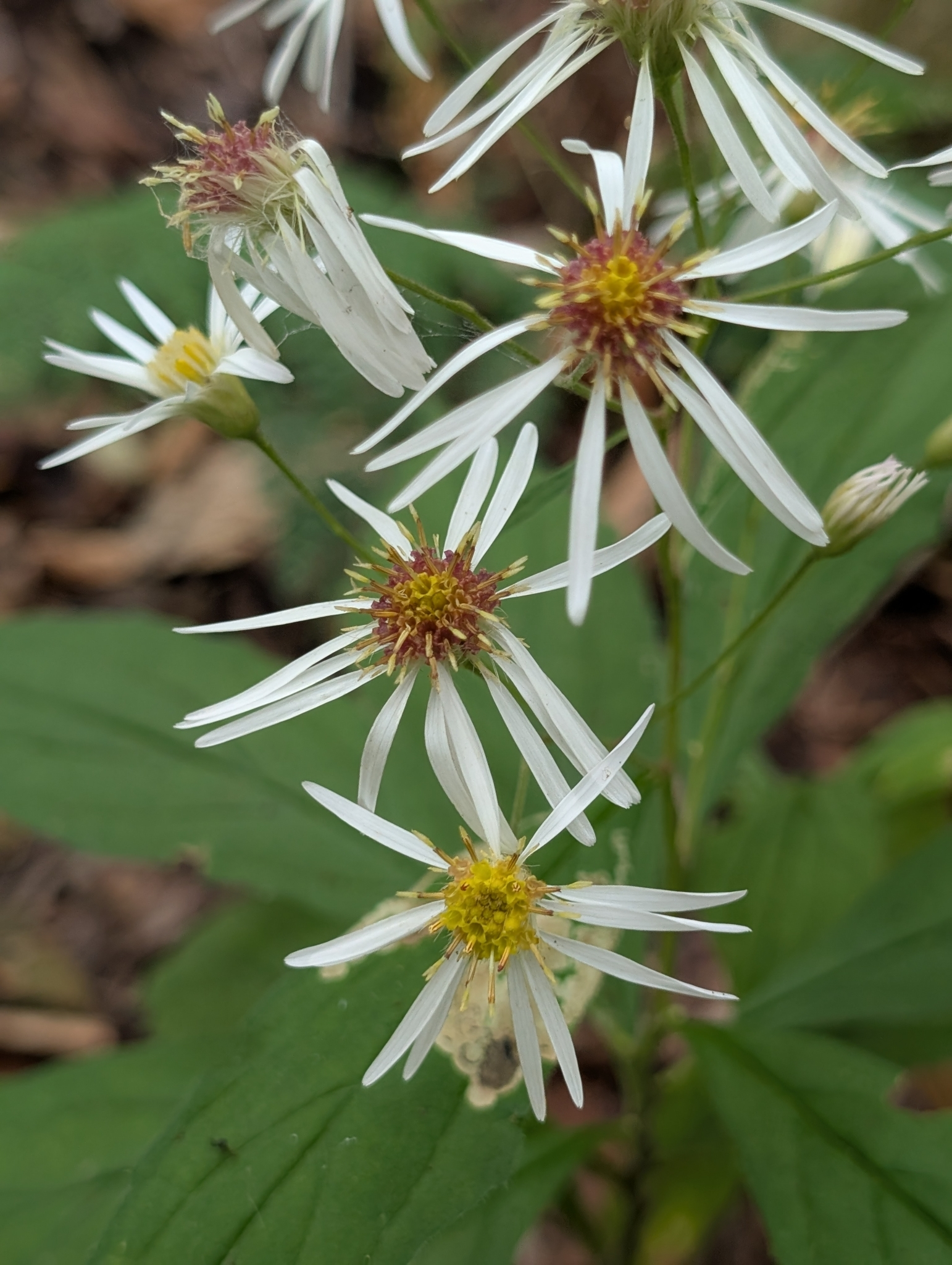
Oclemena acuminata with flowers (August)

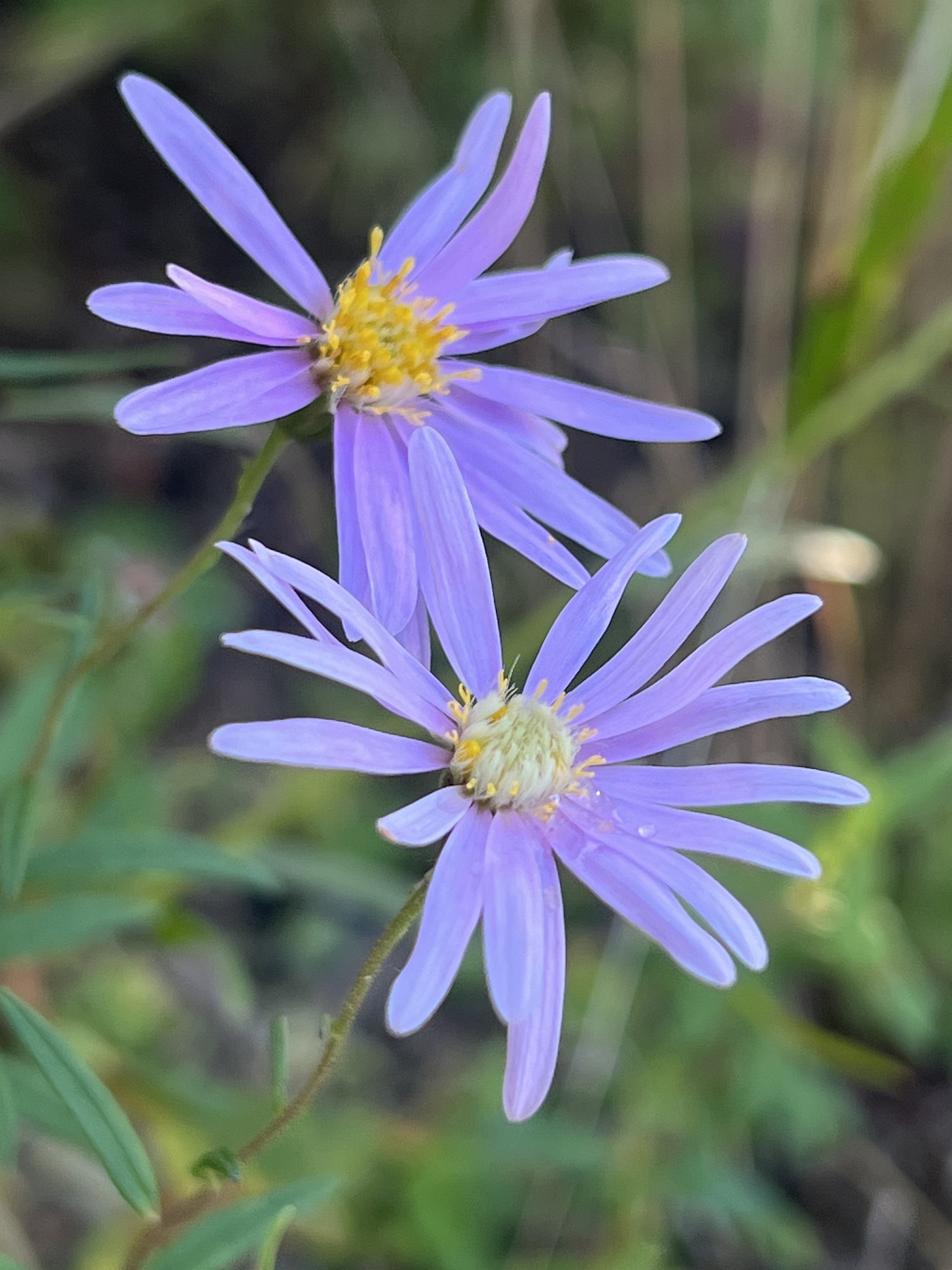
Oclemena nemoralis with flowers (August)

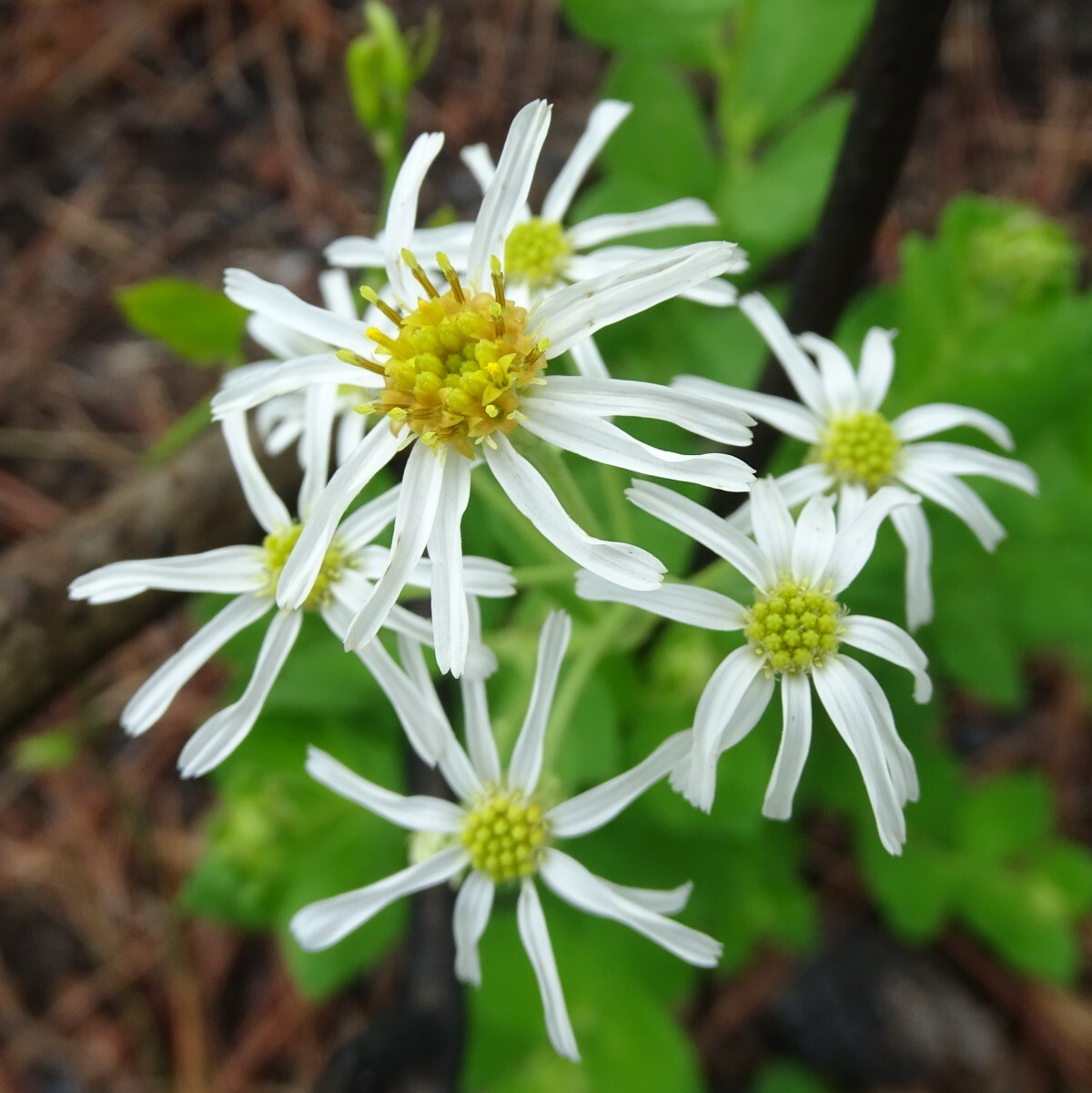
Oclemena reticulata with flowers (June)

== Bibliography ==
- Britton, Nathaniel Lord; Brown, Addison (1913). An illustrated flora of the northern United States, Canada and the British possessions (2nd ed.). New York: Charles Scribner's Sons.
- Greene, Edward Lee (1903). "Further Segregates from Aster". Leaflets of Botanical Observation and Criticism. 1: 4–7.
- Nesom, Guy L. (1995). "Review of the taxonomy of Aster sensu lato (Asteraceae: Astereae), emphasizing the new world species". Phytologia. 77 (3): 141–297.
- Semple, J. C., S. Heard and Chunsheng Xiang, 1996. The Asters of Ontario (Compositae: Astereae): Diplactis Raf., Oclemena Greene, Doellingeria Nees and Aster L. (including Canadanthus Nesom, Symphyotrichum Nees and Virgulus Raf.). University of Waterloo Biology Series No. 30: 1-88.
- Semple, J. C., S. B. Heard and L. Brouillet. 2002. Cultivated and native asters of Ontario (Compositae: Astereae): Aster L. (including Asteromoea Blume, Diplactis Raf. and Kalimeris (Cass.) Cass.), Callistephus Cass., Galatella Cass., Doellingeria Nees, Oclemena E.L. Greene, Eurybia (Cass.) S.F. Gray, Canadanthus Nesom, and Symphyotrichum Nees (including Virgulus Raf.). University of Waterloo Biology Series No. 41: 1-134.
