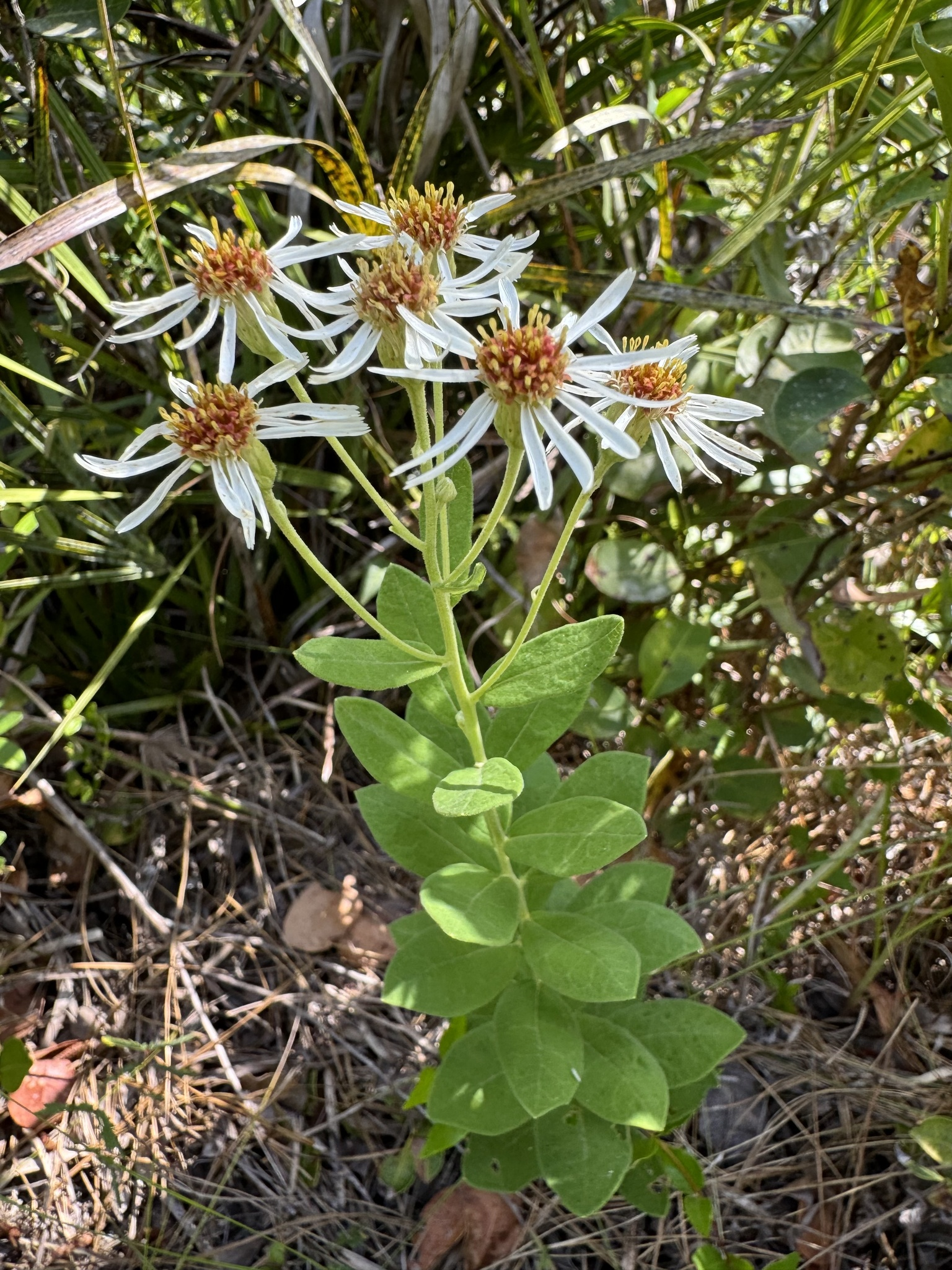
- Florida National Scenic Trail (April 28)

Conservation status
- Apparently Secure (NatureServe)

Scientific classification
- Kingdom: Plantae
- Clade: Tracheophytes
- Clade: Angiosperms
- Clade: Eudicots
- Clade: Asterids
- Order: Asterales
- Family: Asteraceae
- Genus: Oclemena
- Species: O. reticulata

Binomial name
- Oclemena reticulata (Pursh) G.L.Nesom

Synonyms
- Homotypic synonyms: Aster reticulatus Pursh; Doellingeria reticulata (Pursh) Greene; Heterotypic synonyms: Aster dichotomus Elliott; Aster obovatus (Nutt.) Elliott; Chrysopsis obovata Nutt.; Diplopappus obovatus (Nutt.) Torr. & A.Gray; Diplostephium boreale Spreng.; Diplostephium dichotomum DC.; Diplostephium obovatum DC.; Doellingeria obovata (Nutt.) Nees; Inula obovata Nutt. ex Spreng.

= Oclemena reticulata =

Species of flowering plant

Oclemena reticulata, commonly known as pinebarren whitetop aster, is a species of flowering plant in the aster family Asteraceae. It is native to the southeastern United States.

== Description ==
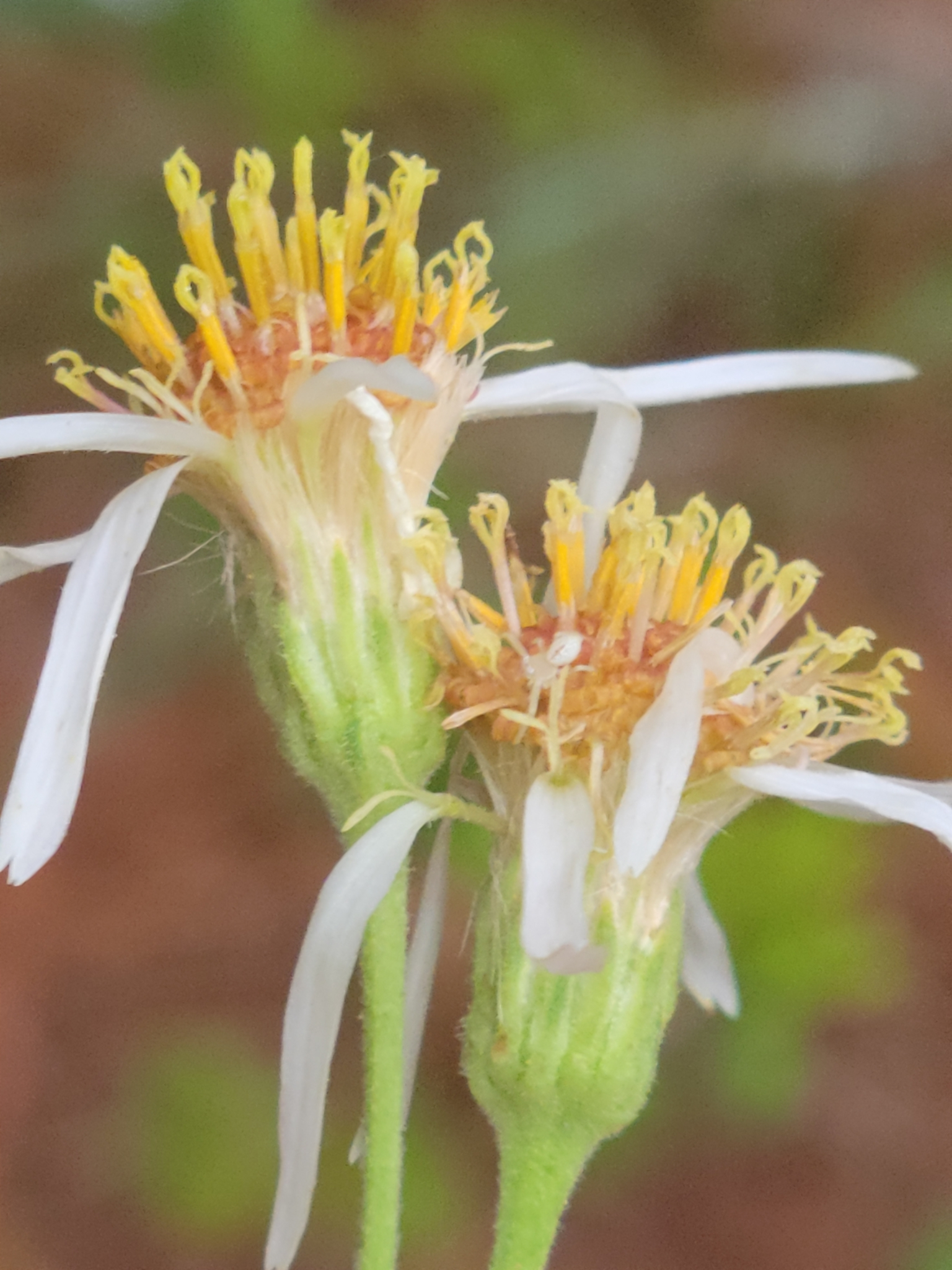
Close-up of flowers (October 9)

Oclemena reticulata is a perennial, herbaceous plant that stands 30–90 cm (12–35 in) tall. It has 12–30 leaves uniformly distributed along the stem, each leaf 10–40 mm (0.4–1.6 in) wide. The leaf margins are entire (or toothed at the tip) and revolute. It has 9–40 flower heads, each with 7–11 ray flowers, white to pink, and 15–30 disc flowers.

== Taxonomy ==
Oclemena reticulata was first described as Aster reticulatus by the German-American botanist Frederick Traugott Pursh in 1813. In 1896, the American botanist Edward Lee Greene transferred Aster reticulatus Pursh to genus Doellingeria, but the American botanist Guy L. Nesom transferred it to genus Oclemena in 1995. As of December 2025, the botanical name Oclemena reticulata (Pursh) G.L.Nesom is widely accepted.

== Distribution and habitat ==
Oclemena reticulata is native to the southeastern United States, in Alabama, Florida, Georgia, and South Carolina.

== Conservation ==
Oclemena reticulata is imperiled (S2) in South Carolina.
