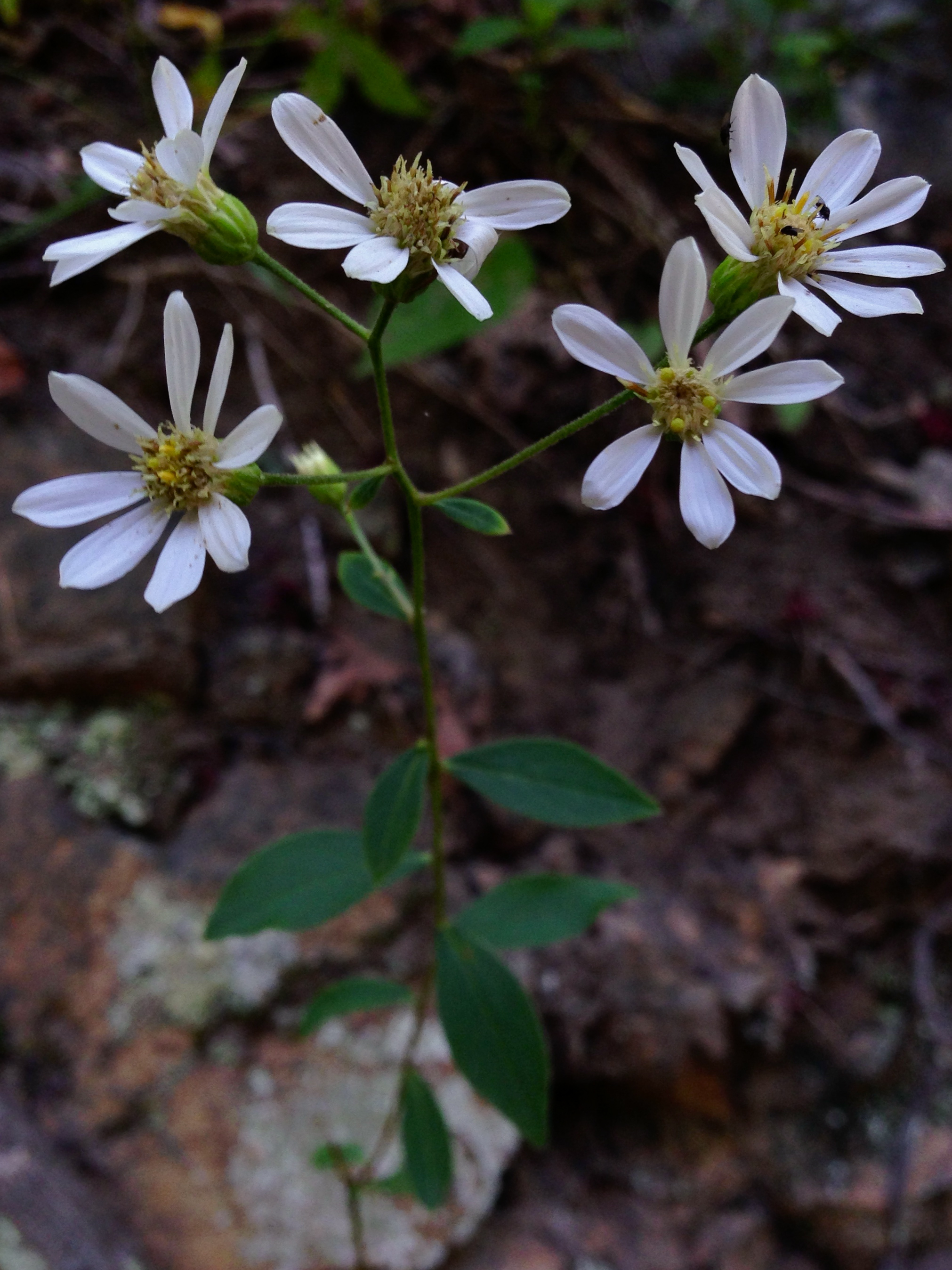

Scientific classification
- Kingdom: Plantae
- Clade: Tracheophytes
- Clade: Angiosperms
- Clade: Eudicots
- Clade: Asterids
- Order: Asterales
- Family: Asteraceae
- Genus: Doellingeria
- Species: D. infirma

Binomial name
- Doellingeria infirma (Michx.) Greene

Synonyms
- Aster cornifolius Muhl. ex Willd.; Aster humilis Willd.; Aster infirmus Michx.; Doellingeria cornifolia (Muhl. ex Willd.) Nees; Doellingeria humilis (Willd.) Britton

= Doellingeria infirma =

Species of plant

Doellingeria infirma, the cornel-leaf whitetop or cornel-leaved aster, is a perennial forb native to the eastern United States, that produces white composite flowers in late summer.

== Description ==
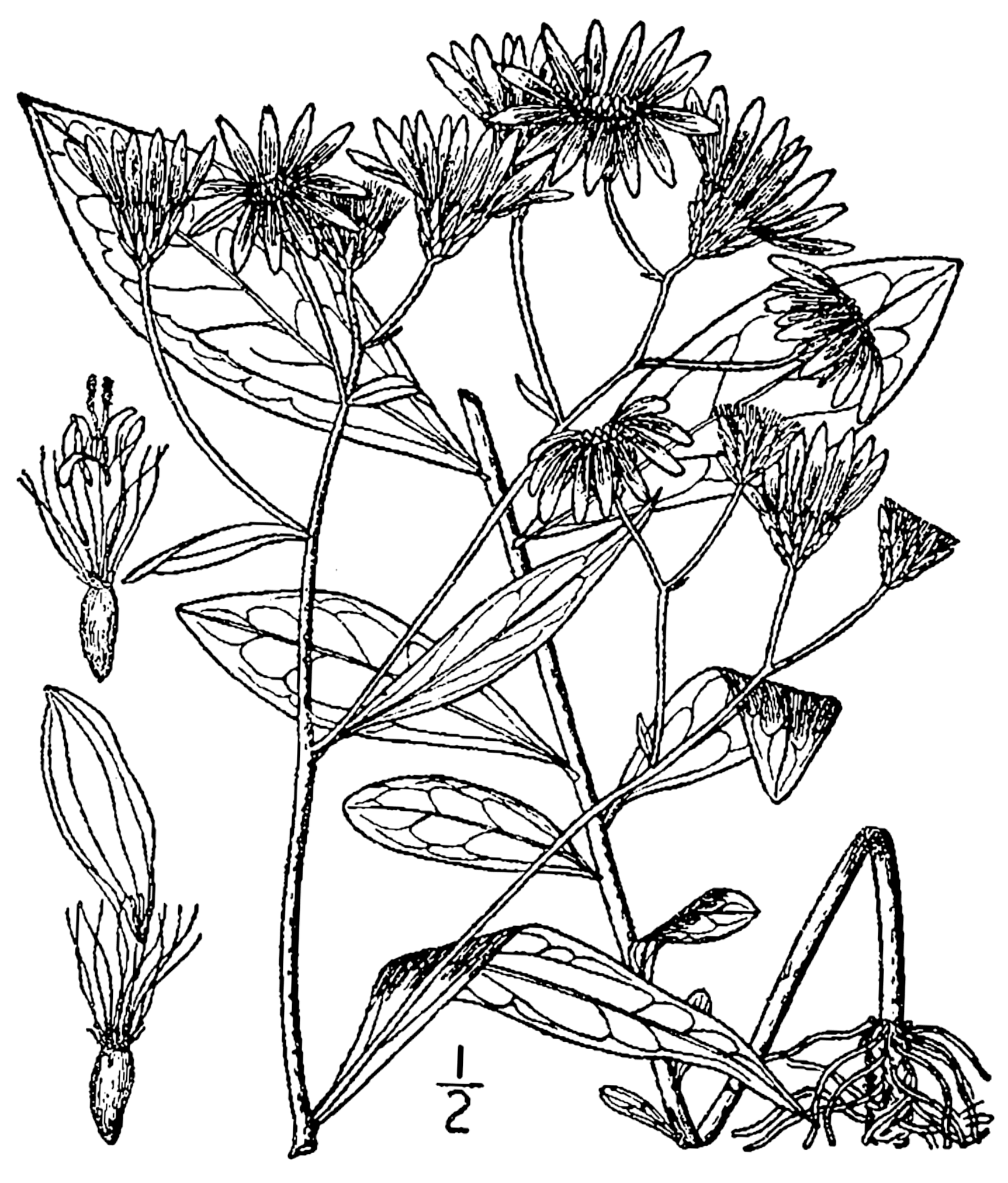
Botanical illustration of Doellingeria infirma (1913)

Doellingeria infirma has a smooth slender 45 to 90 centimeters (18-36 inches) tall stem which is rough and sparingly branched at the summit. It has no basal leaves. The lower leaves are small and obovate. Higher on the stem the leaves become larger, 5 to 12 centimeters (2-5 inches) long and 2.5 to 4 centimeters (1-3 inches) wide. They are oblong-lanceolate, entire, smooth above and sparingly hispid on the veins beneath. There are usually between 3 and 33 flower heads, each consisting of 4-20 disc florets and 3-11 ray florets. The flower heads are arranged in a terminal flat topped cluster. The fruit are cypselae each with a pappus of tawny bristles.

== Distribution and habitat ==
Doellingeria infirma is widely distributed in the eastern United States, although local distribution may be spotty. Its range stretches from Alabama and the Florida Panhandle north as far as Massachusetts, Ohio and New York State. In Virginia, it grows in habitats such as mesic to dry woodlands and clearings. The presence of this species is dependent on appropriate habitat, and it may be eliminated from an area by development, changes in land use, or competition with invasive species.

== Conservation status in the United States ==
Doellingeria infirma is listed as endangered in Massachusetts, and as "historical" in Rhode Island. It is listed as species of special concern and believed extirpated in Connecticut.
