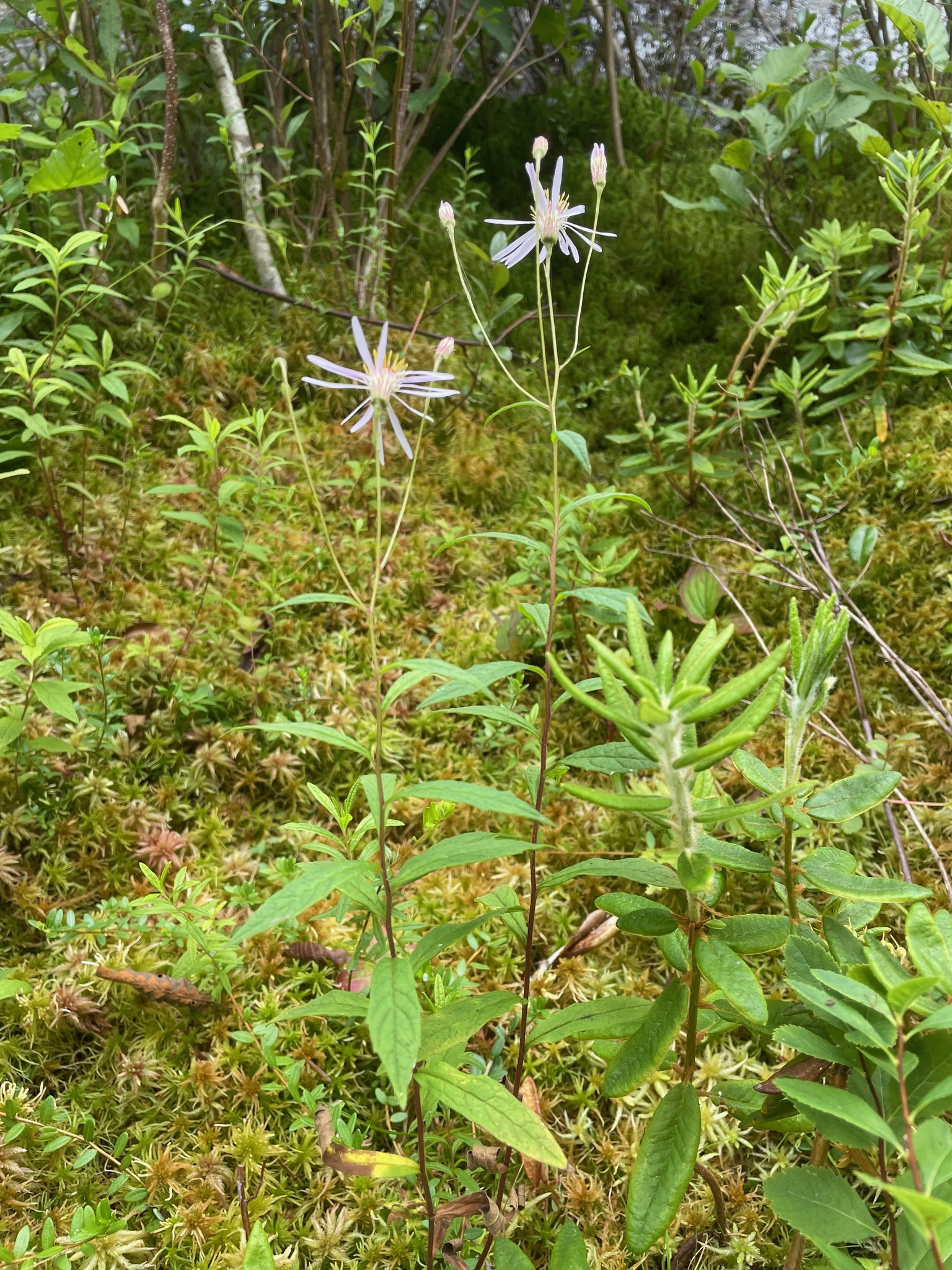

Scientific classification
- Kingdom: Plantae
- Clade: Tracheophytes
- Clade: Angiosperms
- Clade: Eudicots
- Clade: Asterids
- Order: Asterales
- Family: Asteraceae
- Genus: Oclemena
- Species: O. × blakei

Binomial name
- Oclemena × blakei (Porter) G.L.Nesom

Synonyms
- Homotypic synonyms: Aster × blakei (Porter) House; Aster nemoralis var. blakei Porter; Heterotypic synonyms: Aster nemoralis var. major Peck

= Oclemena × blakei =

Hybrid of flowering plant

Oclemena × blakei, commonly known as Blake's aster, is a hybrid of flowering plant in the aster family Asteraceae. It is native to northeastern North America. Its parent species are Oclemena acuminata and Oclemena nemoralis.

== Description ==
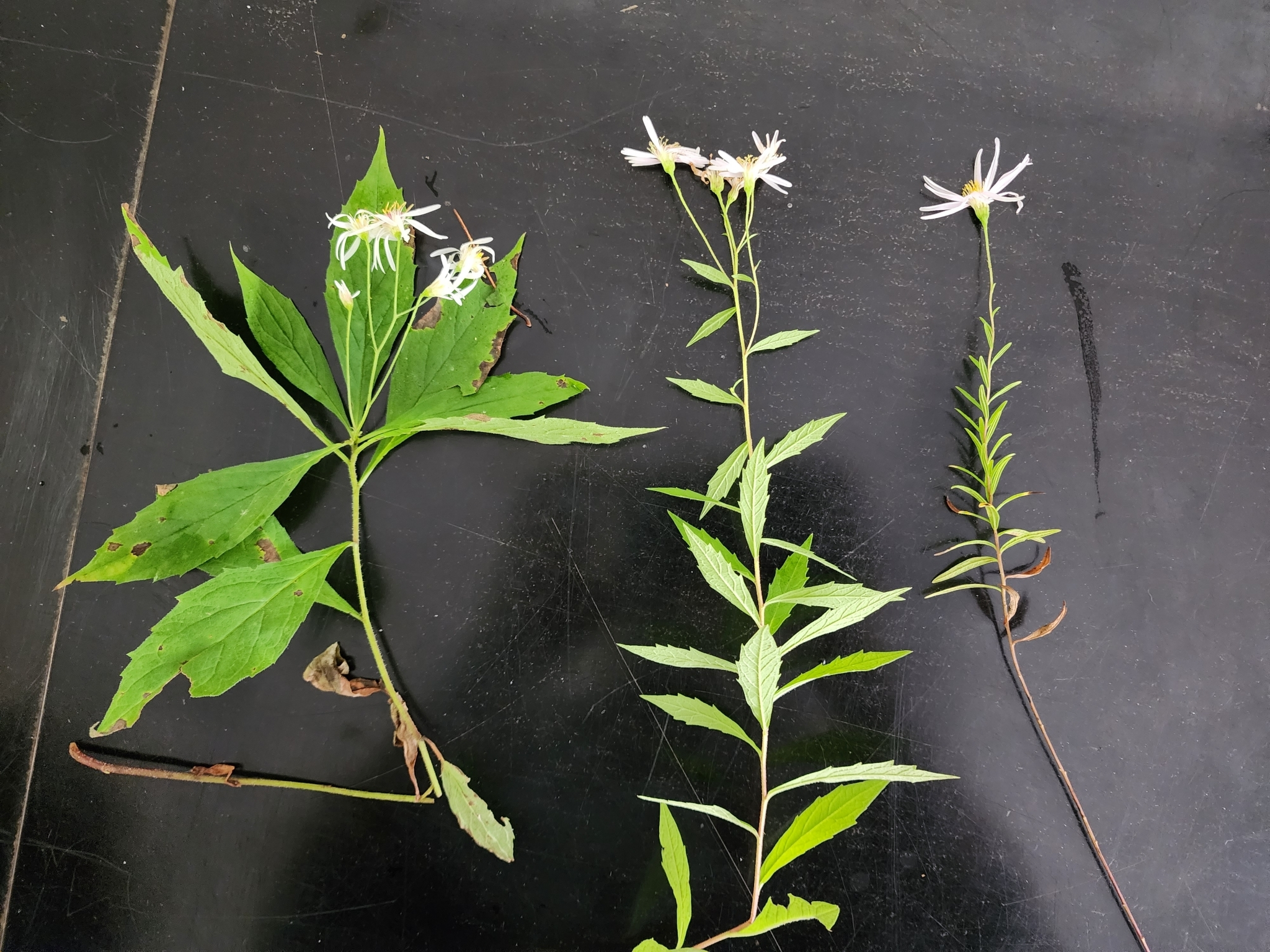
O. acuminata, O. × blakei, and O. nemoralis (left to right)

The hybrid Oclemena × blakei is intermediate in appearance between its parent species. It is distinguished from its parents primarily by its leaves:

	Oclemena acuminata	Oclemena × blakei (O. acuminata × O. nemoralis)	Oclemena nemoralis
Plant height	10–80 cm tall	35–65 cm tall	5–70 cm tall
Number of leaves below inflorescence	10–22; Clustered at the summit of the stem	20–45	40–75; Uniformly sized and distributed
Leaf blades	15–60 mm wide	5–24 mm wide	2–12 mm wide
Leaf margins	Prominently toothed with flat margins	Small teeth	Entire (or nearly so) and revolute
Flower heads	5–46	2–35	1–15
Ray flowers	White or tinged with pink	White to pink	Pink to purple, seldom white
Habitat	Forests		Bogs, fens, mossy lake shores

Oclemena × blakei is sometimes confused with Eurybia radula. The latter has pale blue-violet ray flowers and 4–5 rows of phyllaries (bracts) with rounded tips, whereas the former has white to pink ray flowers and 1–2 rows of phyllaries with pointed tips.

== Taxonomy ==
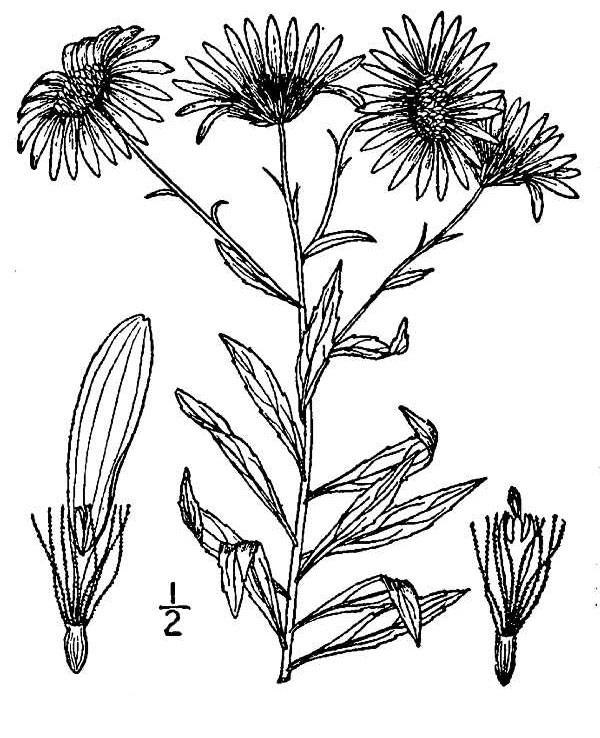
Oclemena × blakei illustrated as Aster nemoralis in 1913

Oclemena × blakei was first described as Aster nemoralis var. blakei by the American botanist Thomas Conrad Porter in 1894. Porter named the variety in honor of the botanist who collected its type specimen in Gilmanton, New Hampshire 30 years earlier. In 1920, the American botanist Homer Doliver House concluded that Aster nemoralis var. blakei Porter "should more properly be regarded as a hybrid" of Aster acuminatus and Aster nemoralis. The resulting hybrid name Aster × blakei (Porter) House remained in use for the rest of the 20th century. In 1995, the American botanist Guy L. Nesom published the name Oclemena acuminata × Oclemena nemoralis. As of December 2025, the hybrid name Oclemena × blakei (Porter) G.L.Nesom is widely accepted.

In the Report of the State Botanist of 1893, Charles Horton Peck described a variety of Aster nemoralis collected in northern Herkimer County, New York along with the typical variety. As described by Peck, the new variety was much larger than Aster nemoralis with a longer stem, more flower heads, and larger leaves. As of December 2025, the name Aster nemoralis var. major Peck is considered to be a synonym of Oclemena × blakei.

== Distribution and habitat ==
Oclemena × blakei is native to eastern Canada and northeastern United States:

- Canada: New Brunswick, Newfoundland, Nova Scotia, Ontario, Prince Edward Island, Quebec
- United States: Connecticut, Maine, Massachusetts, New Hampshire, New Jersey, New York, Rhode Island, Vermont

There are unconfirmed reports that the hybrid occurs in Michigan and Pennsylvania as well.

== Conservation ==
As of December 2025, Oclemena × blakei is not globally ranked by NatureServe. It is secure (S5) in Nova Scotia and critically imperiled (S1) in Connecticut but no other state-level ranks are listed.

== Bibliography ==
- Britton, Nathaniel Lord; Brown, Addison (1913). An illustrated flora of the northern United States, Canada and the British possessions (2nd ed.). New York: Charles Scribner's Sons.
- Brouillet, L.; Simon, J.-P. (1981). "An ecogeographical analysis of the distribution of Aster acuminatus Michx. and A. nemoralis Aiton (Asteraceae: Astereae)". Rhodora. 83: 521–550. JSTOR 23311067.
- Haines, Arthur (2011). New England Wild Flower Society's Flora Novae Angliae: A Manual for the Identification of Native and Naturalized Higher Vascular Plants of New England. Illustrated by Elizabeth Farnsworth and Gordon Morrison. Yale University Press. ISBN 978-0-300-17154-9.
- House, Homer D. (1920). "Notes on local floras VI". Bull. New York State Mus. Nat. Hist. 219–220: 238–246.
- Peck, Charles H. (1894). "Report of the State Botanist 1893". Rep. (Annual) Regents Univ. State New York New York State Mus. 47: 129–174.
- Porter, Thomas C. (1894). "Varieties of Solidago and Aster". Bull. Torrey Bot. Club. 21 (7): 310–311.
