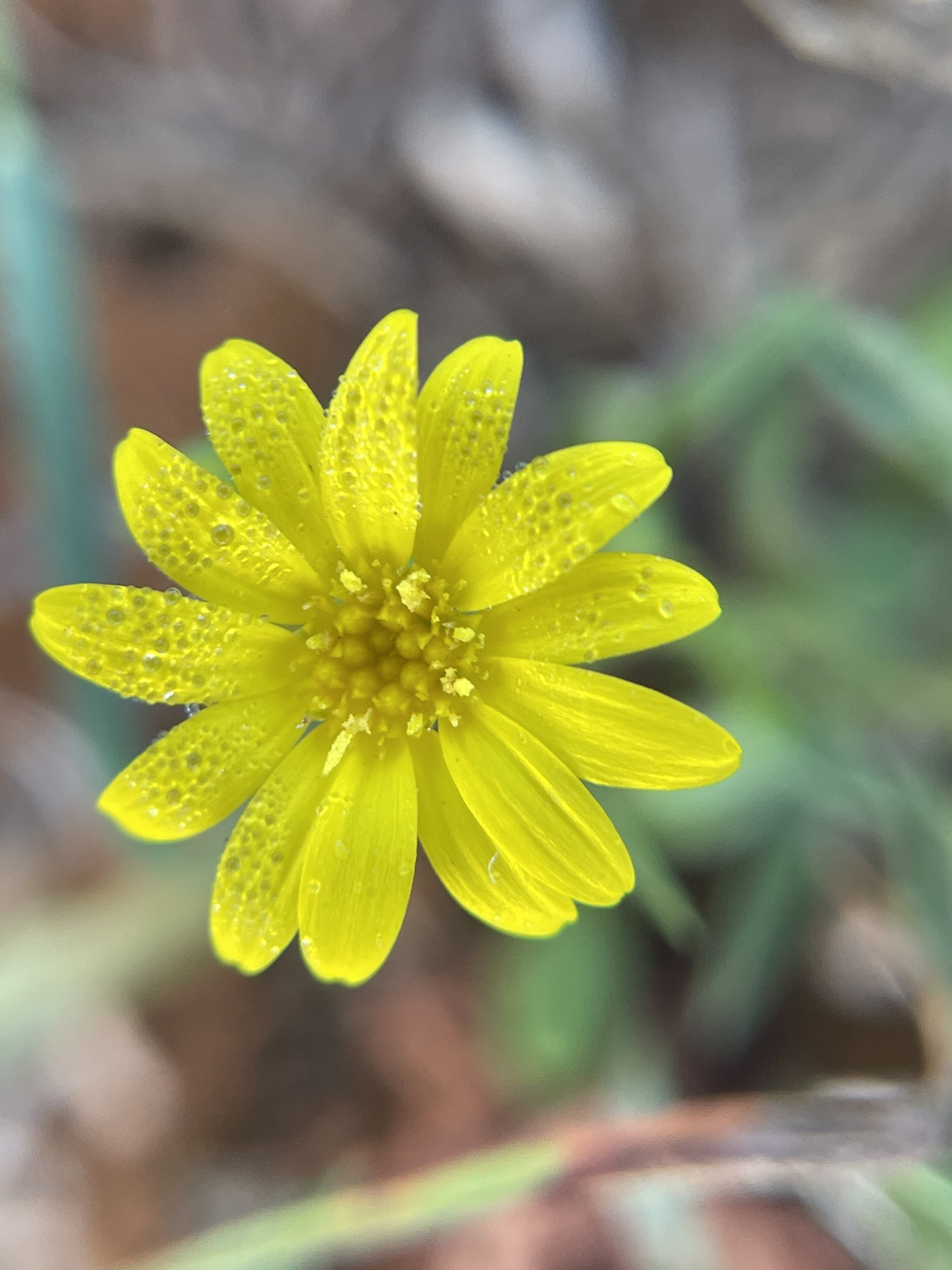

Scientific classification
- Kingdom: Plantae
- Clade: Tracheophytes
- Clade: Angiosperms
- Clade: Eudicots
- Clade: Asterids
- Order: Asterales
- Family: Asteraceae
- Genus: Croptilon
- Species: C. rigidifolium

Binomial name
- Croptilon rigidifolium (E.B.Sm.) E.B.Sm.

Synonyms
- Croptilon divaricatum var. hirtellum (Shinners) Shinners; Haplopappus rigidifolius E.B.Sm.; Isopappus divaricatus var. hirtellus Shinners

= Croptilon rigidifolium =

Species of flowering plant

Croptilon rigidifolium, called the stiff-leaf scratchdaisy, is a North American species of flowering plants in the tribe Astereae within the family Asteraceae. It has been found in the US State of Texas and also in the Mexican State of Nuevo León.

Croptilon rigidifolium is an herb sometimes reaching a height of 150 cm (5 feet). Flower heads are yellow, with both ray florets and disc florets.
