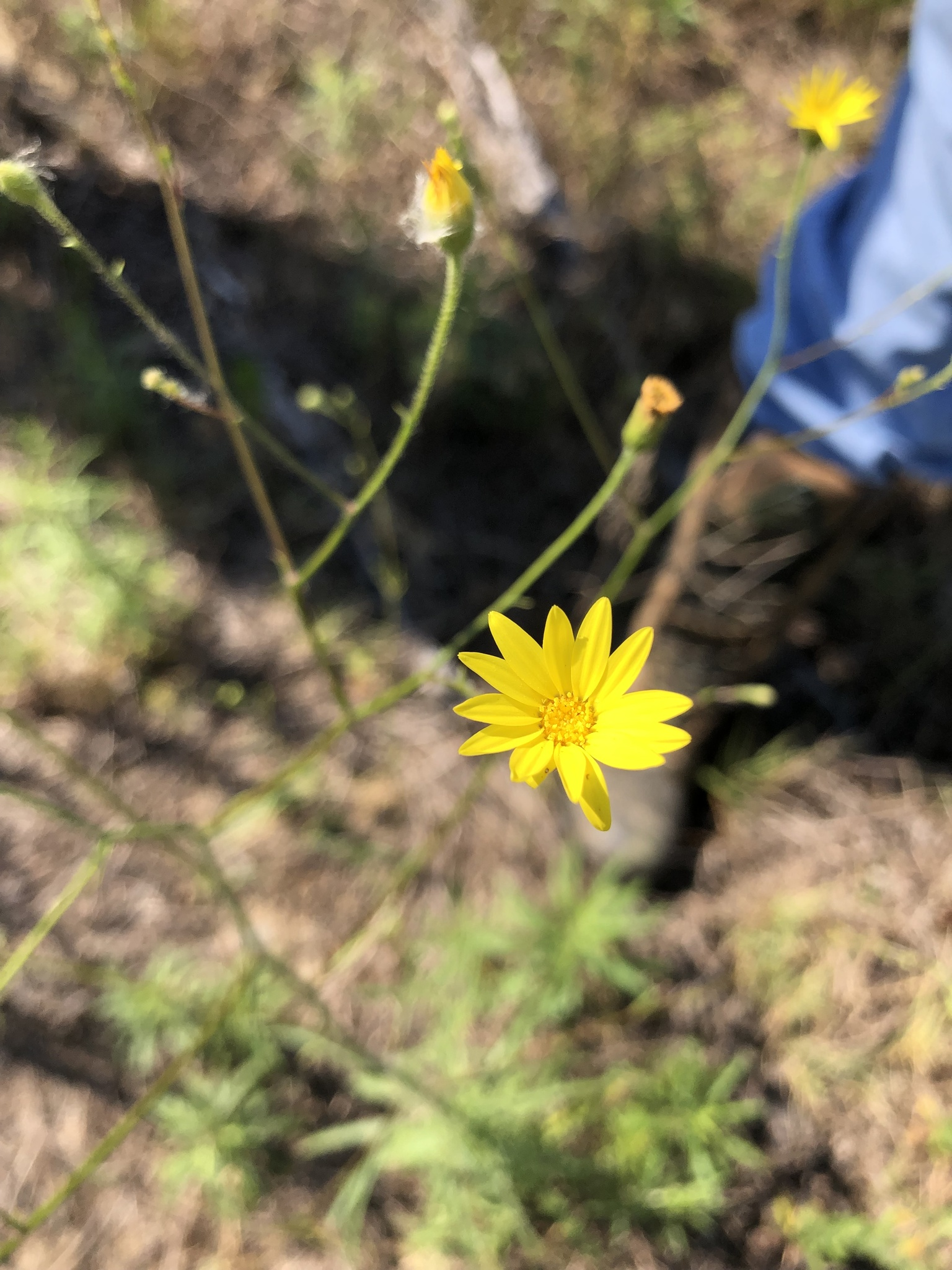
- Croptilon hookerianum var. validum

Scientific classification
- Kingdom: Plantae
- Clade: Embryophytes
- Clade: Tracheophytes
- Clade: Angiosperms
- Clade: Eudicots
- Clade: Asterids
- Order: Asterales
- Family: Asteraceae
- Genus: Croptilon
- Species: C. hookerianum

Binomial name
- Croptilon hookerianum (Torr. & A.Gray) House

Synonyms
- Synonymy: Croptilon divaricatum var. hookerianum (Torr. & A.Gray) Shinners; Haplopappus divaricatus var. hookerianus (Torr. & A.Gray) Waterf.; Haplopappus validus subsp. torreyi E.B.Sm.; Isopappus hookerianus Torr. & A.Gray; Croptilon divaricatum var. graniticum (E.B.Sm.) Shinners, syn of var. graniticum; Haplopappus validus subsp. graniticus E.B.Sm., syn of var. graniticum; Haplopappus validus (Rydb.) Cory, syn of var. validum; Isopappus validus Rydb., syn of var. validum

= Croptilon hookerianum =

Species of flowering plant

Croptilon hookerianum, called Hooker's scratchdaisy, is a North American species of flowering plants in the tribe Astereae within the family Asteraceae. It has been found in the US states of Texas, Oklahoma, Kansas, and Arkansas.

Croptilon hookerianum is an herb sometimes reaching a height of 120 cm (4 feet). Flower heads are yellow, with both ray florets and disc florets.

Varieties

- Croptilon hookerianum var. graniticum (E.B.Sm.) E.B.Sm. - Texas
- Croptilon hookerianum var. hookerianum - Texas
- Croptilon hookerianum var. validum (Rydb.) E.B.Sm. - Arkansas, Kansas, Oklahoma, Texas
