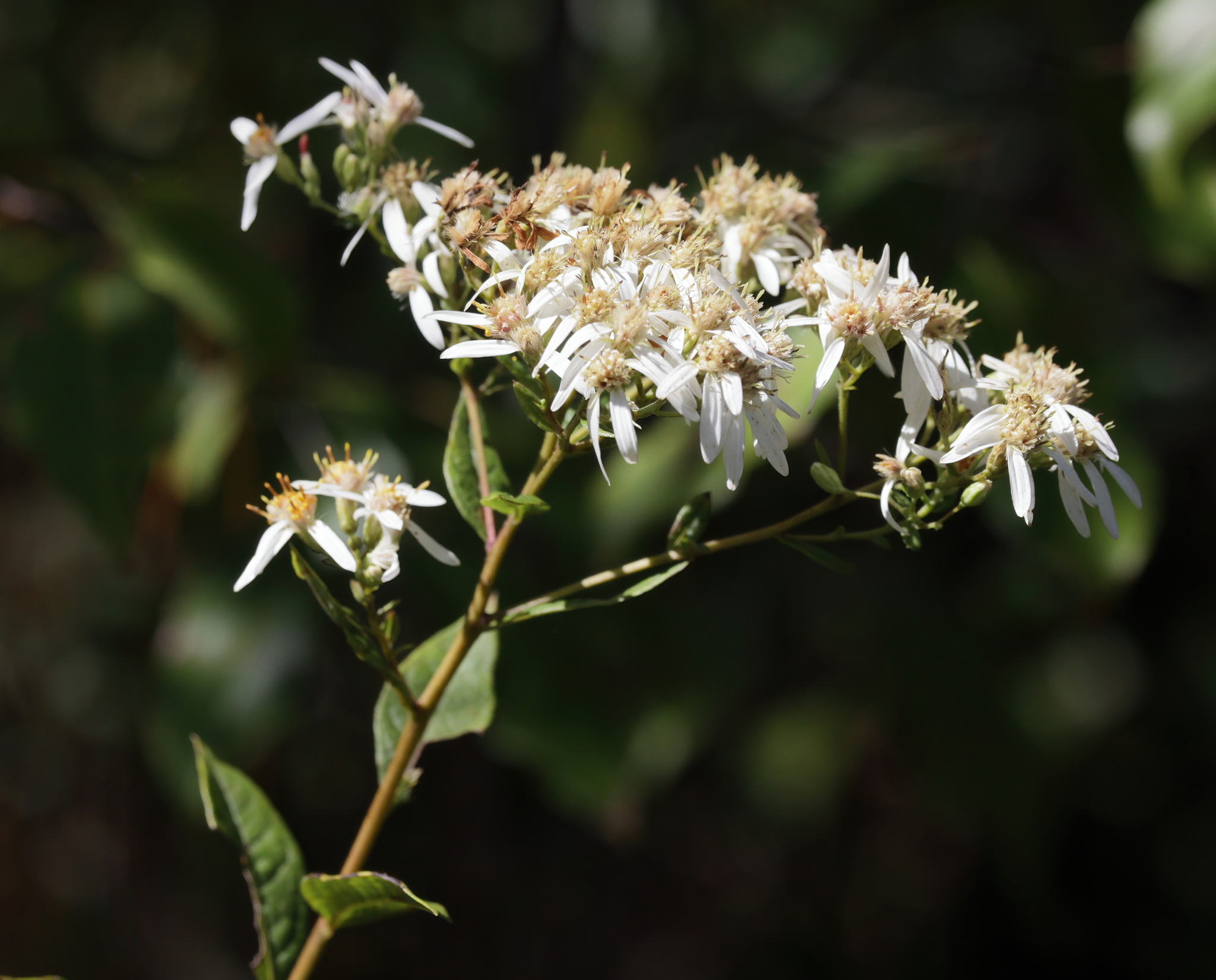

Scientific classification
- Kingdom: Plantae
- Clade: Tracheophytes
- Clade: Angiosperms
- Clade: Eudicots
- Clade: Asterids
- Order: Asterales
- Family: Asteraceae
- Genus: Doellingeria
- Species: D. sericocarpoides

Binomial name
- Doellingeria sericocarpoides Small

Synonyms
- Aster sericocarpoides (Small) K.Schum.; Aster umbellatus var. brevisquamus Fernald; Aster umbellatus var. latifolius A.Gray; Doellingeria umbellata var. latifolia (A.Gray) House

= Doellingeria sericocarpoides =

Species of flowering plant

Doellingeria sericocarpoides (common names the southern tall flat-topped aster, southern whitetop aster, and Pocosin flat-topped aster) is a North American perennial forb native to the eastern United States. It ranges from eastern Texas and southeastern Oklahoma to northern Florida north as far as New York State, though uncommon in the northern part of that range.

Doellingeria sericocarpoides is a perennial up to 150 cm (5 feet) tall, spreading by means of underground rhizomes. It can sometimes produce as many as 200 small flower heads, each with 2-7 white ray florets and 4-20 yellow disc florets.
