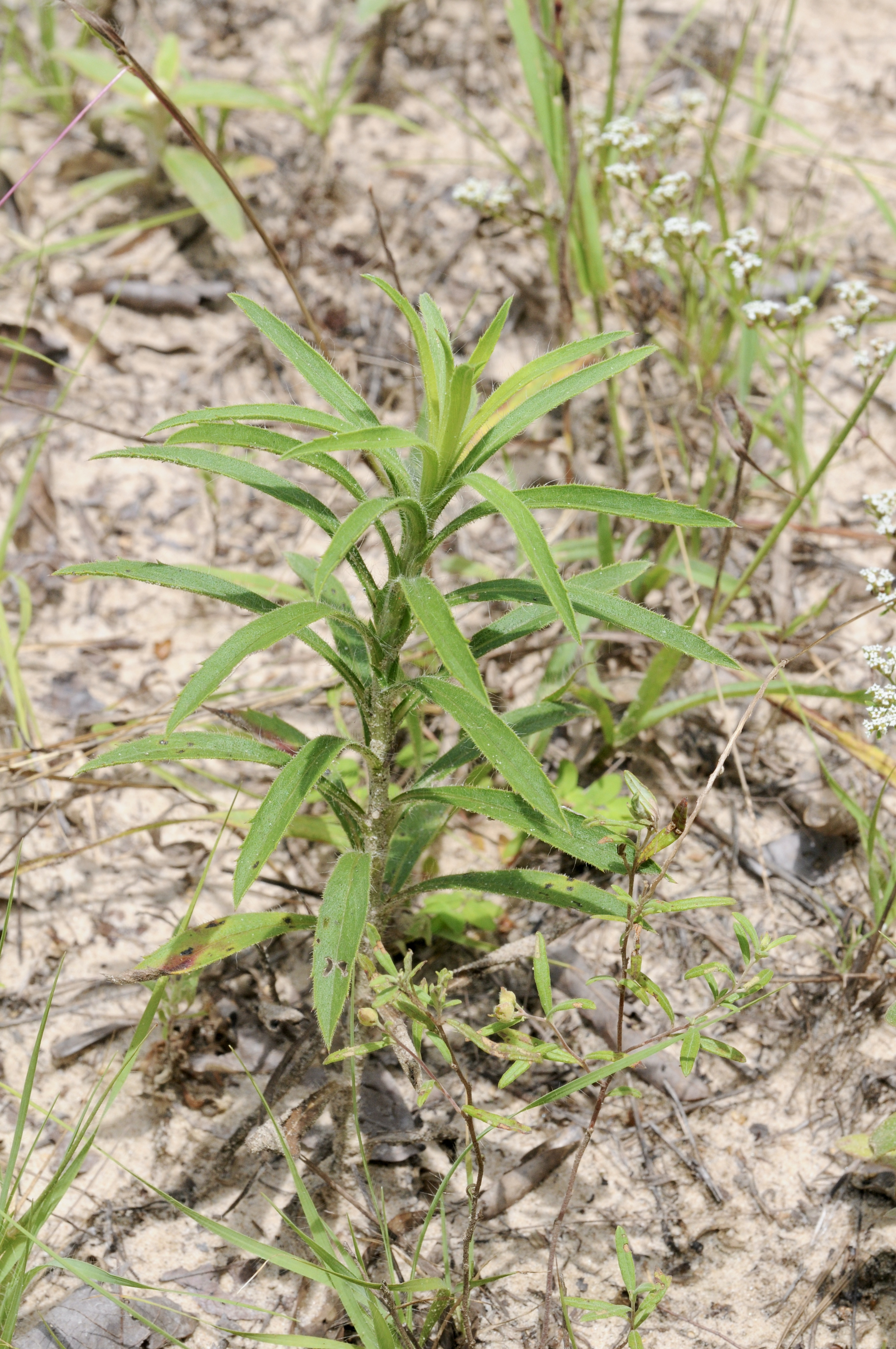
- Croptilon divaricatum

Scientific classification
- Kingdom: Plantae
- Clade: Embryophytes
- Clade: Tracheophytes
- Clade: Angiosperms
- Clade: Eudicots
- Clade: Asterids
- Order: Asterales
- Family: Asteraceae
- Subfamily: Asteroideae
- Tribe: Astereae
- Subtribe: Chrysopsidinae
- Genus: Croptilon; Raf.

Synonyms
- Haplopappus sect. Isopappus (Torr. & A.Gray) Benth. & Hook.f.; Isopappus Torr. & A.Gray

= Croptilon =

Genus of flowering plants

Croptilon is a small North American genus of flowering plants in the tribe Astereae within the family Asteraceae.

Species

Croptilon is native to the southeastern and south-central United States as well as northeastern Mexico.

- Croptilon divaricatum (Nutt.) Raf. - south-central + southeastern USA
- Croptilon hookerianum (Torr. & A.Gray) House - south-central USA
- Croptilon rigidifolium (E.B.Sm.) E.B.Sm. - Texas, Nuevo León
