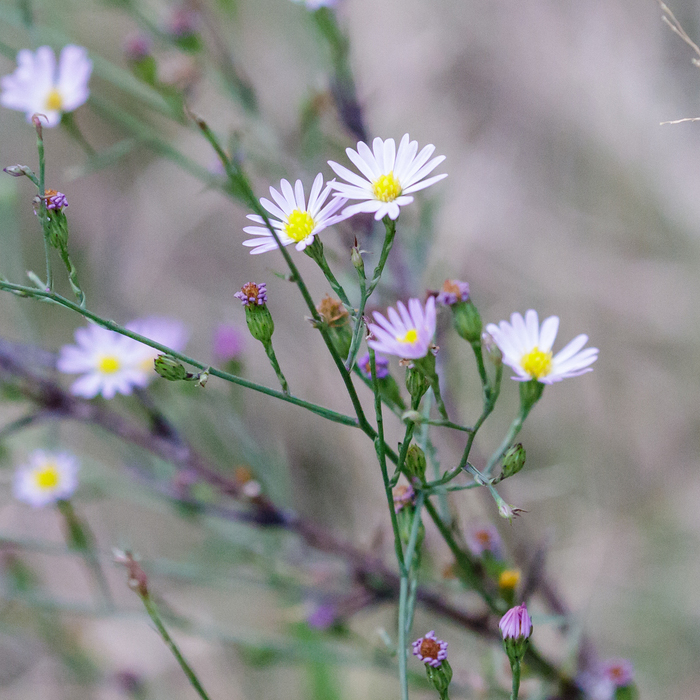
- Bell County, Texas

Conservation status
- Secure (NatureServe)

Scientific classification
- Kingdom: Plantae
- Clade: Tracheophytes
- Clade: Angiosperms
- Clade: Eudicots
- Clade: Asterids
- Order: Asterales
- Family: Asteraceae
- Tribe: Astereae
- Subtribe: Symphyotrichinae
- Genus: Symphyotrichum
- Subgenus: Symphyotrichum subg. Astropolium
- Species: S. divaricatum

Binomial name
- Symphyotrichum divaricatum (Nutt.) G.L.Nesom
- Native distribution

Synonyms
- Basionym: Tripolium divaricatum Nutt.; Alphabetical list: Aster divaricatus (Nutt.) Torr. & A.Gray; Aster divaricatus var. alatus E.S.Burgess; Aster divaricatus var. curtifolius E.S.Burgess; Aster divaricatus var. cymulosus E.S.Burgess; Aster divaricatus var. deltoideus E.S.Burgess; Aster divaricatus var. fontinalis E.S.Burgess; Aster divaricatus var. persaliens E.S.Burgess; Aster subulatus var. ligulatus Shinners; Erigeron multiflorus Hook. & Arn.; Symphyotrichum subulatum var. ligulatum (Shinners) S.D.Sundb.

= Symphyotrichum divaricatum =

Species of plant in the aster family

Symphyotrichum divaricatum (formerly Symphyotrichum subulatum var. ligulatum) is an annual and herbaceous plant commonly known as southern annual saltmarsh aster. It is native to the southern United States and some northern states of Mexico.

== Description ==
Symphyotrichum divaricatum is an annual and herbaceous plant with a tap root. It usually grows between 60 and 200 centimeters (2 and 6 1/2 feet), but may remain below that height as low as 10 cm (4 in). Stems are green and simple, but sometimes have lower branches. Stems often have purple or brownish areas, and they are hairless. Sometimes there are small hairs where the leaves meet the stem. The hairless leaves are thin and green to dark green in color.

The species usually flowers from July through November, but sometimes into February. It has lavender to blue ray florets surrounding yellow disk florets. As the plant is drying after pollination, each ray floret curls under into three to five coils.

== Distribution and habitat ==
Symphyotrichum divaricatum is native to the Mexican states of Baja California Sur, Chihuahua, Coahuila, and Tamaulipas, as well as the US states of Alabama, Arkansas, Kansas, Louisiana, Mississippi, Nebraska, New Mexico, Oklahoma, Tennessee, Texas, and Virginia. It has been introduced into Colombia and New York. It grows in marshy habitats, roadsides, lawns, and waste places at 0–1,500 meters (0–4,921 feet), and is often considered weedy.

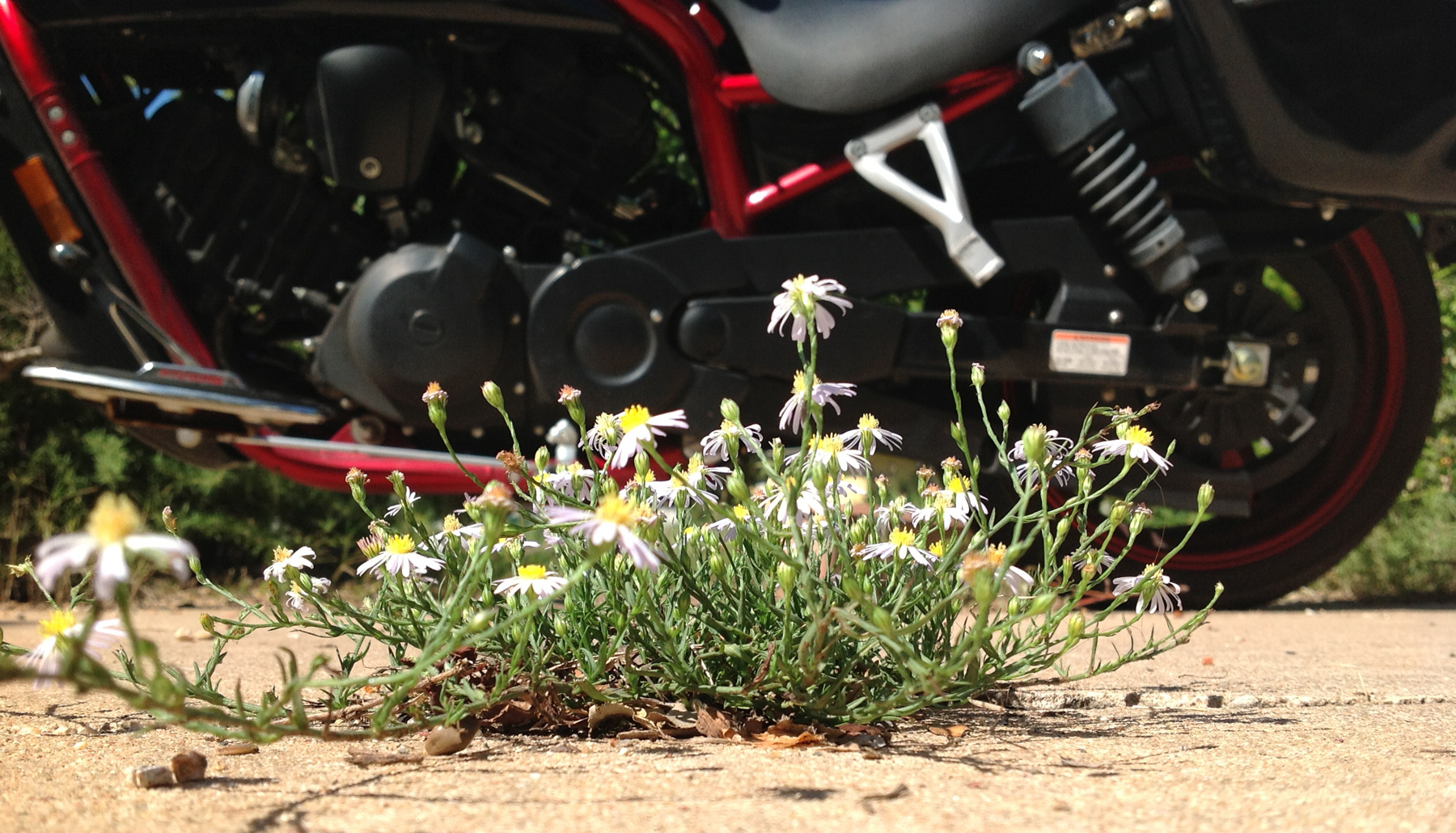
Growing from a crack in dirt or a driveway

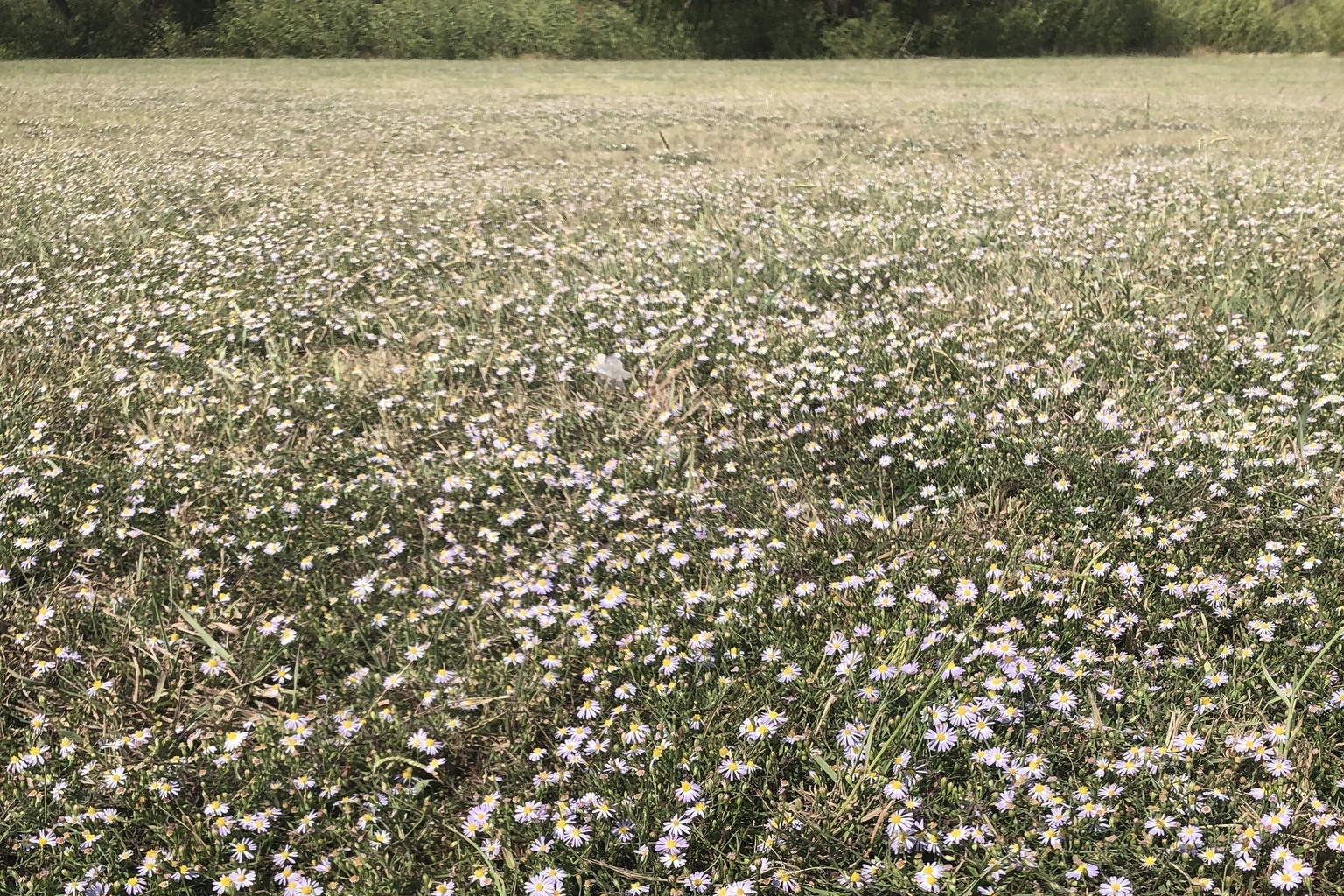
Growing in a large field

== Taxonomy ==
The species' full scientific name is Symphyotrichum divaricatum (Nutt.) G.L.Nesom. As of December 2021, its former name, S. subulatum var. ligulatum (Shinners) S.D.Sundb., is a taxonomic synonym to this species.

== Conservation ==
As of December 2021, NatureServe lists it as Secure (G5) worldwide, and Critically Imperiled (S1) in West Virginia, (Note: Plants of the World Online (POWO), Hassler, and Flora of North America (FNA) report no presence in West Virginia.) Apparently Secure (S4) in Nebraska, as well as exotic in Missouri. NatureServe's last review of the global status of this species was 21 December 2001.
