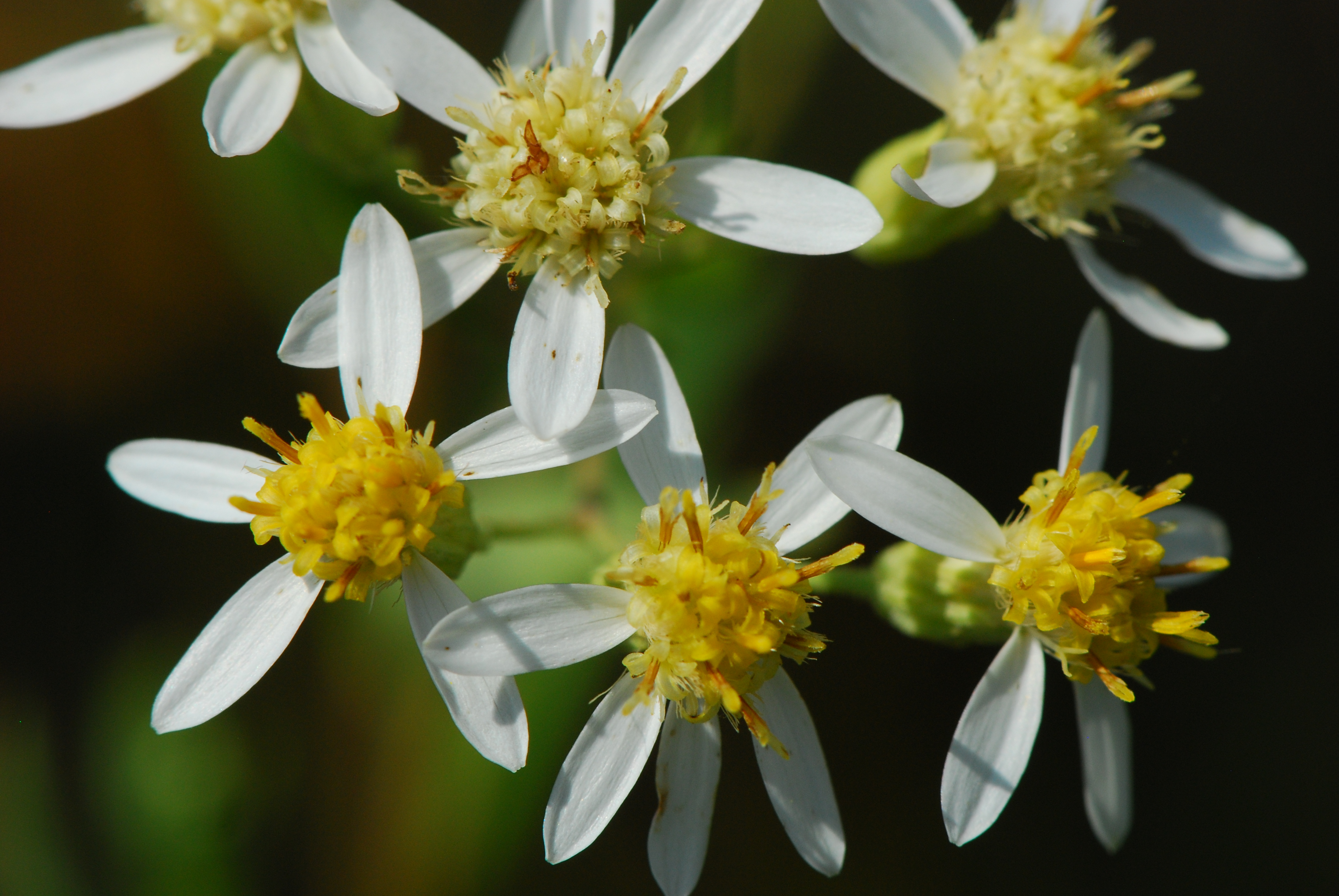
- At Karcher Springs, Racine County, Wisconsin, United States

Scientific classification
- Kingdom: Plantae
- Clade: Tracheophytes
- Clade: Angiosperms
- Clade: Eudicots
- Clade: Asterids
- Order: Asterales
- Family: Asteraceae
- Genus: Doellingeria
- Species: D. umbellata

Binomial name
- Doellingeria umbellata (Mill.) Nees

Synonyms
- Synonymy: Aster amygdalinus Lam.; Aster umbellatus Mill.; Diplopappus amygdalinus (Lam.) Hook.; Diplopappus amygdalinus (Lam.) Torr. & A.Gray; Diplopappus umbellatus (Mill.) Hook.; Diplostephium amygdalinum (Lam.) Cass.; Diplostephium umbellatum (Mill.) Cass.; Doellingeria amygdalina (Lam.) Nees; Doellingeria pubens (A.Gray) Rydb.; Inula amygdalina (Lam.) Nutt.; Aster pubentior Cronquist, syn of var. pubens

= Doellingeria umbellata =

Species of flowering plant

Doellingeria umbellata, known by the common names tall flat-topped white aster, parasol whitetop, or tall white-aster, is a North American plant species in the family Asteraceae. It is native to Canada (from Alberta to Newfoundland), St. Pierre and Miquelon, and the eastern and north-central United States (from Nebraska and the Dakotas east to Maine and South to Mississippi, Georgia and the Florida Panhandle.

Doellingeria umbellata is a perennial up to 200 cm (80 inches) tall, spreading by means of underground rhizomes. It can sometimes produce as many as 300 small flower heads, each with as many as 16 white ray florets and 50 yellow disc florets.

Varieties

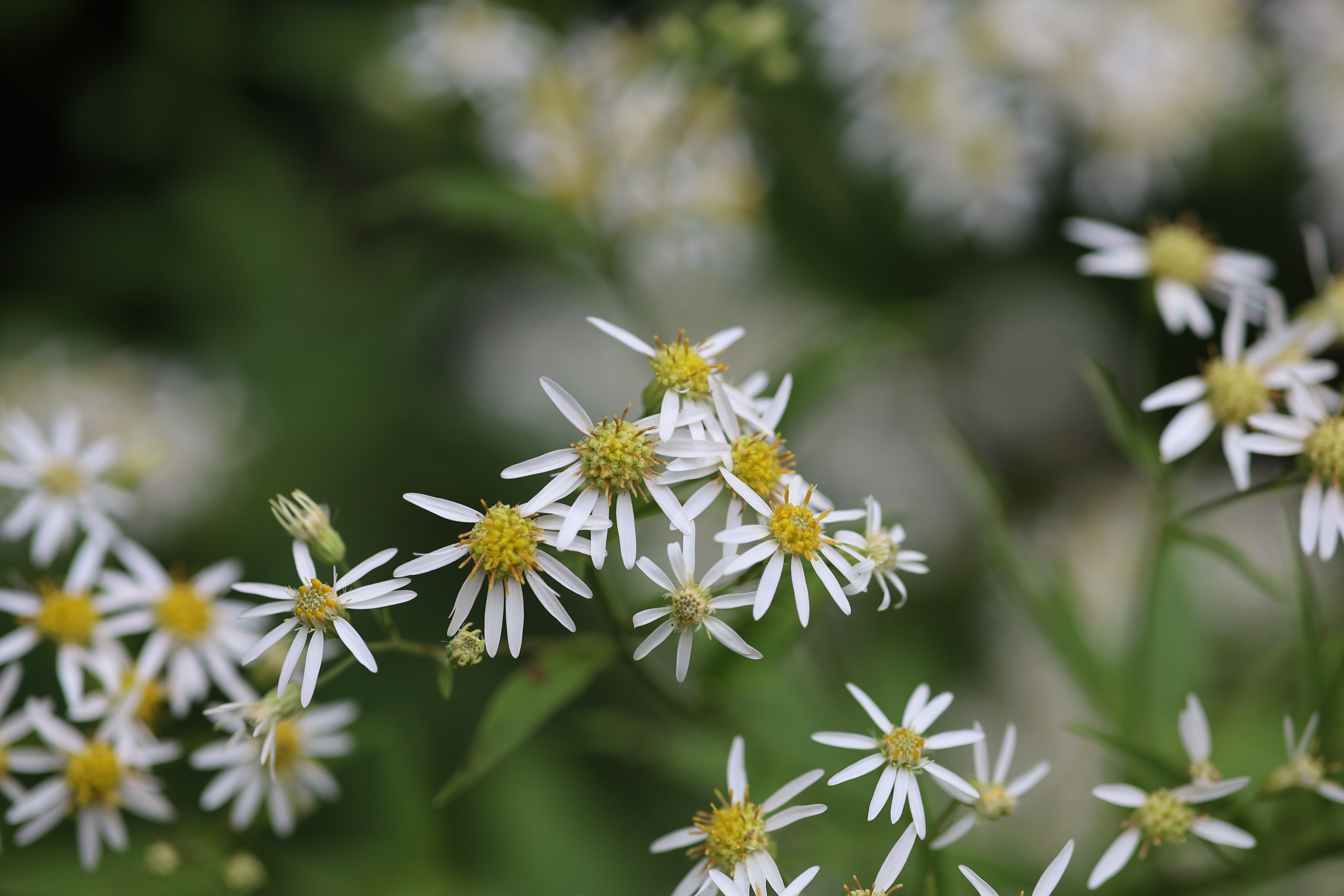
Aster umbellatus, Doellingeria umbellata, Aster pubentior. Quebec, Canada

This perennial grows in full sun or part-shade and moist or draining wet soils that are best slightly acid in reaction, but adapts to moderately acid or slightly alkaline reaction.

- Doellingeria umbellata var. pubens (A.Gray) Britton - Alberta, Manitoba, Ontario, Québec, Saskatchewan, Illinois, Iowa, Michigan, Minnesota, Nebraska, North Dakota, Wisconsin
- Doellingeria umbellata var. umbellata - St. Pierre and Miquelon, Newfoundland, New Brunswick, Nova Scotia, Ontario, Prince Edward Island, Québec, Alabama, Connecticut, Delaware, Georgia, Illinois, Indiana, Iowa, Kentucky, Maine, Maryland, Massachusetts, Michigan, Minnesota, New Hampshire, New Jersey, New York, North Carolina, Ohio, Pennsylvania, Rhode Island, South Carolina, Tennessee, Vermont, Virginia, West Virginia, Wisconsin
