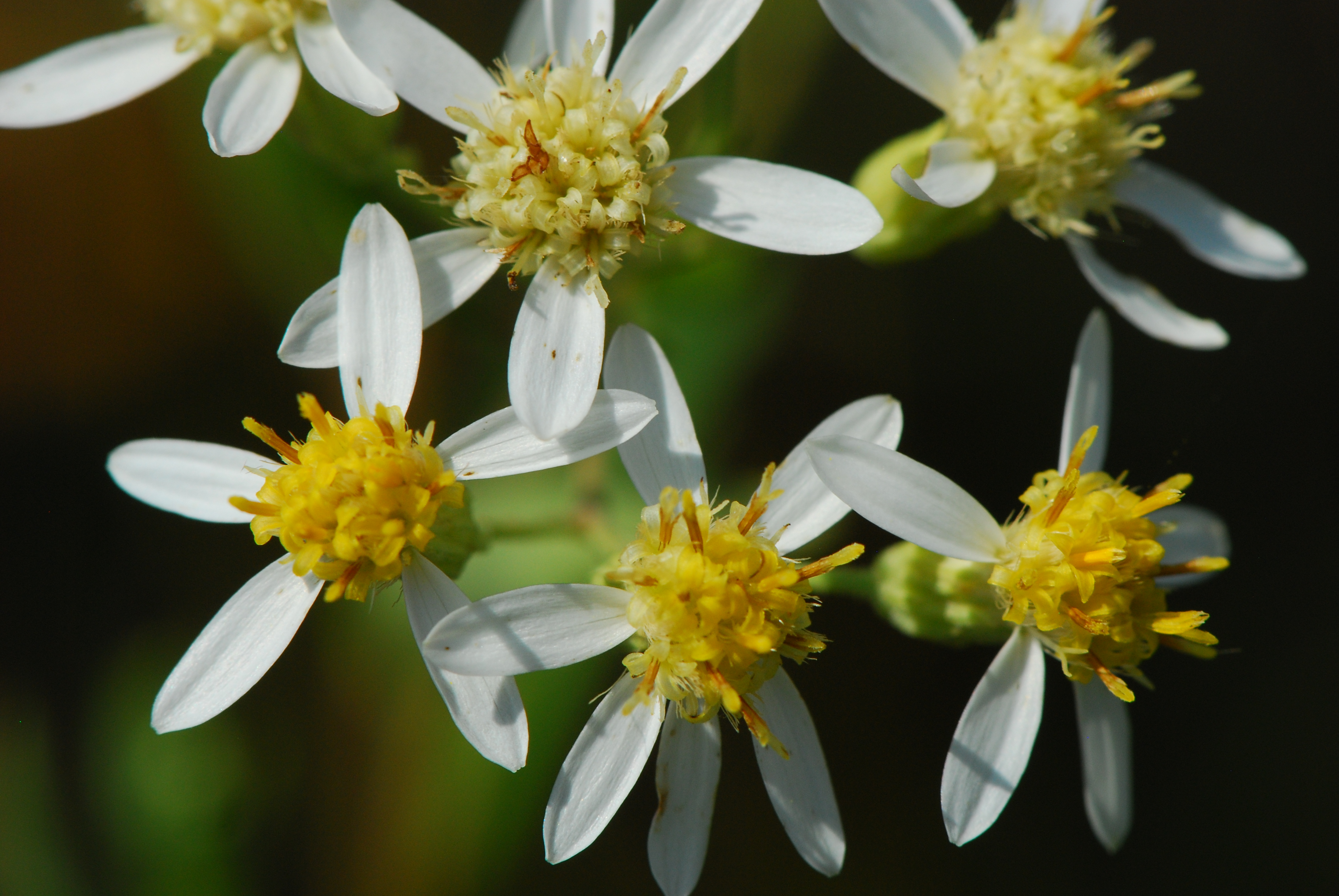
- Doellingeria umbellata

Scientific classification
- Kingdom: Plantae
- Clade: Embryophytes
- Clade: Tracheophytes
- Clade: Angiosperms
- Clade: Eudicots
- Clade: Asterids
- Order: Asterales
- Family: Asteraceae
- Subfamily: Asteroideae
- Tribe: Astereae
- Subtribe: Doellingeriinae
- Genus: Doellingeria; Nees

Synonyms
- Aster subg. Doellingeria (Nees) A.Gray; Aster sect. Doellingeria (Nees) Kitam.

= Doellingeria =

Genus of flowering plants

Doellingeria is a genus of flowering plants in the family Asteraceae. It contains species formerly included in Aster but now considered to be a distinct genus. They are known commonly as tall flat-topped asters or whitetops.

There is still some disagreement as to which species should be included in Doellingeria. Some authorities include up to 10 or 11 species in Doellingeria, but phylogenetic analyses suggest that any Asian plants in the genus should be classified in Aster, making Doellengeria an endemic North American genus. A fourth is now treated as Oclemena reticulata.

Doellingeria is a genus of perennial herbs growing from rhizomes or woody bases. The unbranched stems grow erect and the tallest can reach 200 cm (79 in) in height. The alternately arranged leaves have smooth edges and are sometimes woolly or rough-haired. The flower heads are a few millimeters long and contain 2 to 10 white ray florets, sometimes more. The disc florets are light yellow and the lobes at the tips may spread or curl. The fruit is a cypsela with a pappus of three rings of white or tan bristles and an outer ring of scales.

Species

- Doellingeria dimorphophylla (Franch. & Sav.) G.L.Nesom – Japan
- Doellingeria infirma (Michx.) Greene eastern US (from Alabama to Massachusetts)
- Doellingeria komonoensis (Makino) G.L.Nesom – Japan
- Doellingeria longipetiolata (C.C.Chang) G.L.Nesom – Sichuan in China
- Doellingeria rugulosa (Maxim.) G.L.Nesom – Japan
- Doellingeria scabra (Thunb.) Nees – China, Japan, Korea, Russia (Irkutsk, Amur Oblast, Khabarovsk, Primorye)
- Doellingeria sekimotoi (Makino) G.L.Nesom – Japan
- Doellingeria sericocarpoides Small – southeastern US (Texas to Maryland; a few populations in New York and New Jersey)
- Doellingeria sohayakiensis (Koidz.) G.L.Nesom – Japan
- Doellingeria umbellata (Mill.) Nees – US (Florida to Maine + North Dakota); Canada (Alberta to Newfoundland)
