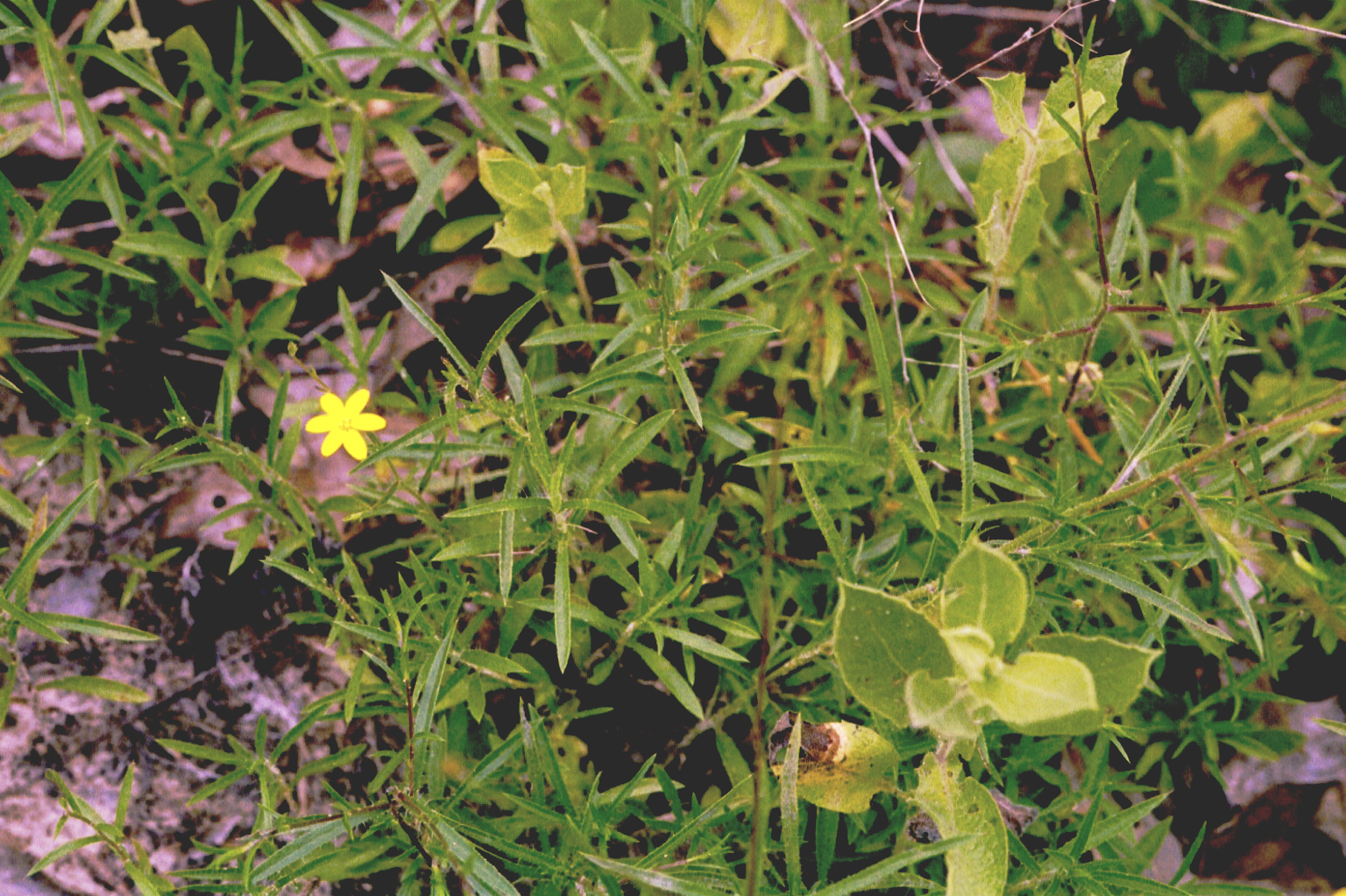
- In Texas

Scientific classification
- Kingdom: Plantae
- Clade: Tracheophytes
- Clade: Angiosperms
- Clade: Eudicots
- Clade: Asterids
- Order: Asterales
- Family: Asteraceae
- Genus: Croptilon
- Species: C. divaricatum

Binomial name
- Croptilon divaricatum (Nutt.) Raf.

Synonyms
- Chrysopsis divaricata (Nutt.) Elliott; Diplopappus divaricatus (Nutt.) Hook.; Haplopappus divaricatus (Nutt.) A.Gray; Inula divaricata Nutt.; Isopappus divaricatus (Nutt.) Torr. & A.Gray

= Croptilon divaricatum =

Species of flowering plant

Croptilon divaricatum, called the slender scratchdaisy, is a North American species of flowering plants in the tribe Astereae within the family Asteraceae. It is native to the southeastern and south-central United States, in the states of Texas, Oklahoma, Arkansas, Louisiana, Mississippi, Alabama, Florida, Georgia, Virginia, and the Carolinas.

Croptilon divaricatum is an annual or perennial herb sometimes reaching a height of 150 cm (5 feet) and forming a large taproot. Each plant produces one or more yellow flower heads, each with up to 30 ray florets and as many as 100 disc florets.

== Distribution and habitat ==
C. divaricatum is found in the U.S. Gulf States, occurring in areas that have sandy soil. It is found in longleaf pine-wiregrass savannahs turkey oak sand ridges, and along the edges of hillside bogs and hardwood swamps, requiring high light conditions. C. divaricatum can also be found in human-disturbed areas, such as fallow fields, roadsides, and orange groves.
