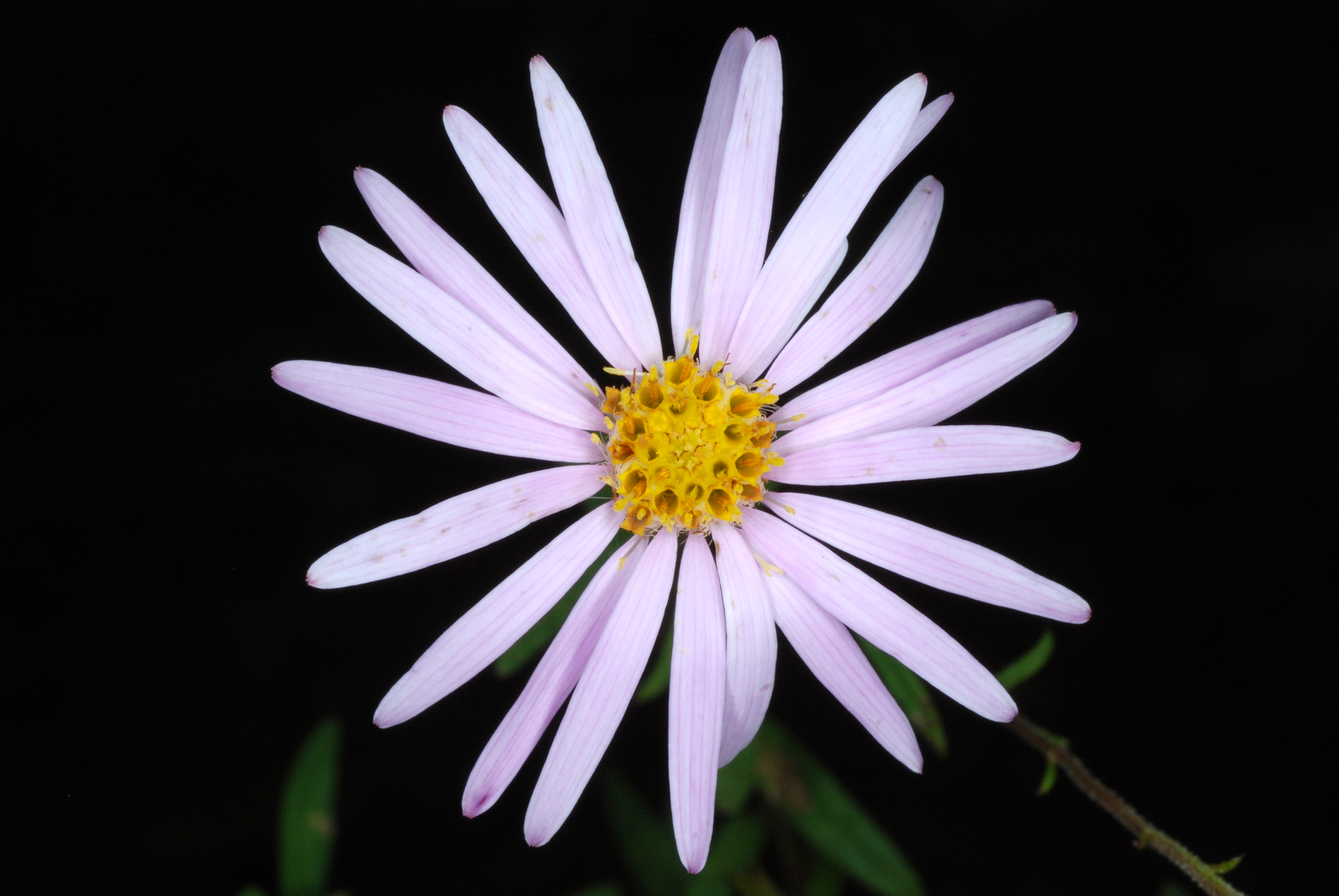
- Hamilton County, New York in August

Conservation status
- Secure (NatureServe)

Scientific classification
- Kingdom: Plantae
- Clade: Tracheophytes
- Clade: Angiosperms
- Clade: Eudicots
- Clade: Asterids
- Order: Asterales
- Family: Asteraceae
- Genus: Oclemena
- Species: O. nemoralis

Binomial name
- Oclemena nemoralis (Aiton) Greene

Synonyms
- Homotypic synonyms: Aster nemoralis Aiton; Eucephalus nemoralis (Aiton) Greene; Heterotypic synonyms: Aster greenii Nees ex Torr. & A.Gray; Aster ledifolius Pursh; Aster ledifolius var. uniflorus Pursh; Aster nemoralis f. albiflorus Fernald; Aster uniflorus Michx.; Galatella nemoralis Nees; Galatella nemoralis var. monocephalus DC.; Galatella nemoralis var. uniflora (Pursh) Hook.; Matricaria americana Mill.

= Oclemena nemoralis =

Species of flowering plant

Oclemena nemoralis, commonly known as bog aster or bog nodding-aster, is a species of flowering plant in the aster family Asteraceae. It is native to northeastern North America. It is one of the parent species of the hybrid known as Blake's aster.

== Description ==
Oclemena nemoralis is a perennial, herbaceous plant that propagates via a swollen tuber at the tip of a slender, elongated rhizome. It stands 5–70 cm (2–28 in) tall with 30–100 leaves uniformly distributed along the stem, each leaf 1–8 mm wide. The leaf margins are entire (or nearly so) and revolute. It can have as many as 15 flower heads (nodding in bud) but it usually has a single flower head borne on a thread-like peduncle 3–7 cm (1.2–2.8 in) long. A flower head has 13–25 ray flowers, pink to purple (seldom white), and 20–35 disc flowers.

Oclemena nemoralis is closely related to Oclemena acuminata. Hybrid populations can occur wherever the parent species come in contact, that is, at the forest-bog ecotone. The hybrid is known as Blake's aster.

== Taxonomy ==
Oclemena nemoralis was first described as Aster nemoralis by the Scottish botanist William Aiton in 1789. The American botanist Edward Lee Greene transferred Aster nemoralis Aiton to genus Eucephalus in 1896, but Greene transferred it again in 1903, this time to genus Oclemena. As of December 2025, the botanical name Oclemena nemoralis (Aiton) Greene is widely accepted.

== Distribution and habitat ==
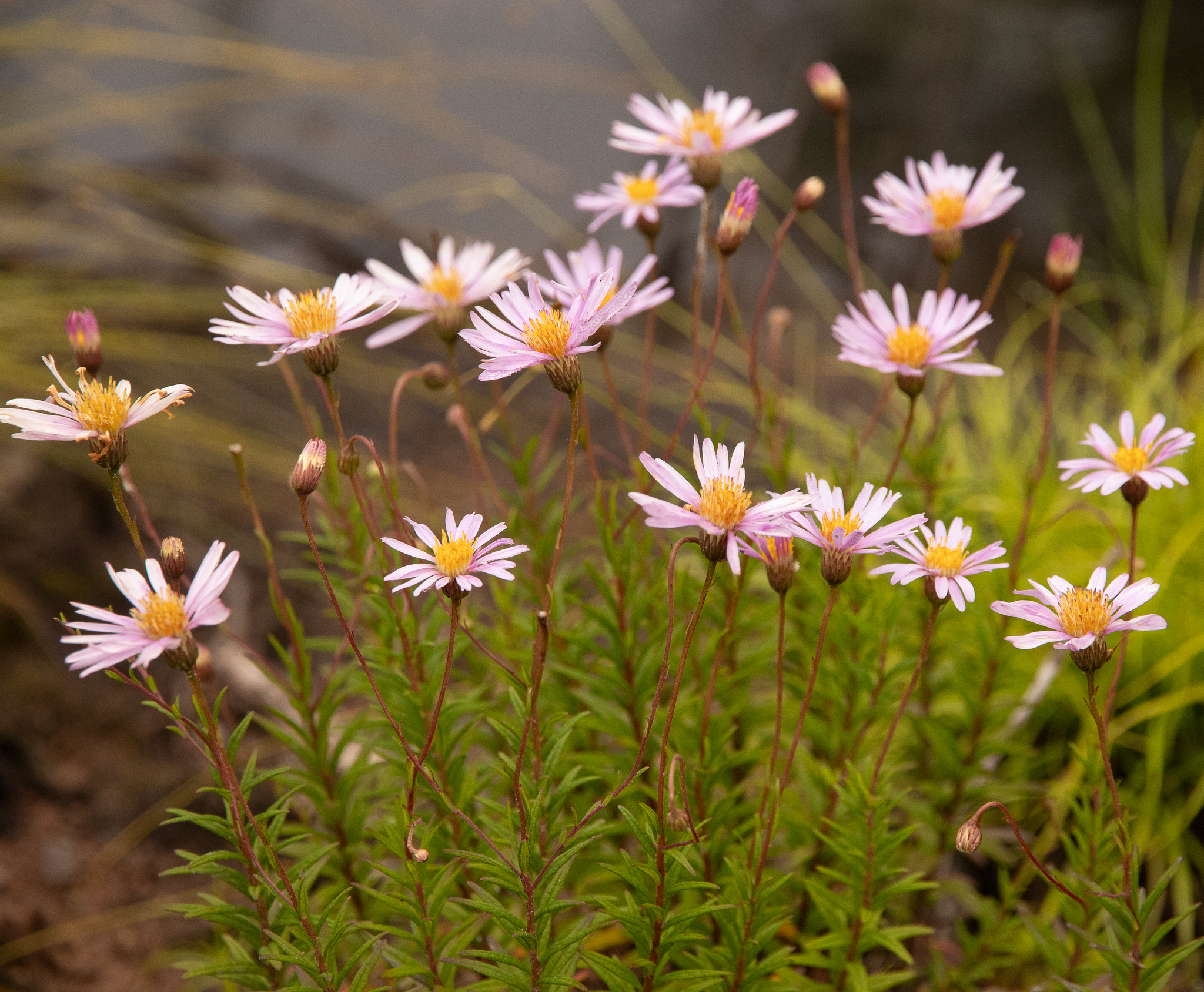
In flower and bud in Nova Scotia in July

Oclemena nemoralis is native to eastern Canada and northeastern United States:

- Canada: New Brunswick, Newfoundland and Labrador, Nova Scotia, Ontario, Prince Edward Island, Quebec
- United States: Connecticut, Delaware, Maine, Maryland, Massachusetts, Michigan, New Hampshire, New Jersey, New York, Pennsylvania, Rhode Island, Vermont
- Other: Saint Pierre and Miquelon

Throughout most of its range, Oclemena nemoralis has adapted to acidic sphagnum bogs but in the eastern Upper Peninsula of Michigan, it prefers fen habitat.

== Conservation ==
As of December 2025, Oclemena nemoralis is globally secure (G5). Its conservation status in Canada is also secure. However, it is uncommon (S3) in Prince Edward Island, Michigan, and New York; imperiled (S2) in Rhode Island and Vermont; and both critically imperiled (S1) and endangered in Connecticut and Pennsylvania. It is presumed to be extirpated (SX) in Delaware.

== Uses ==
The Ojibwe use a decoction of root as drops or on a compress for sore ears.

== Bibliography ==
- Greene, Edward Lee (1903). "Further Segregates from Aster". Leaflets of Botanical Observation and Criticism. 1: 4–7.
- Nesom, Guy L. (1995). "Review of the taxonomy of Aster sensu lato (Asteraceae: Astereae), emphasizing the new world species". Phytologia. 77 (3): 141–297.
