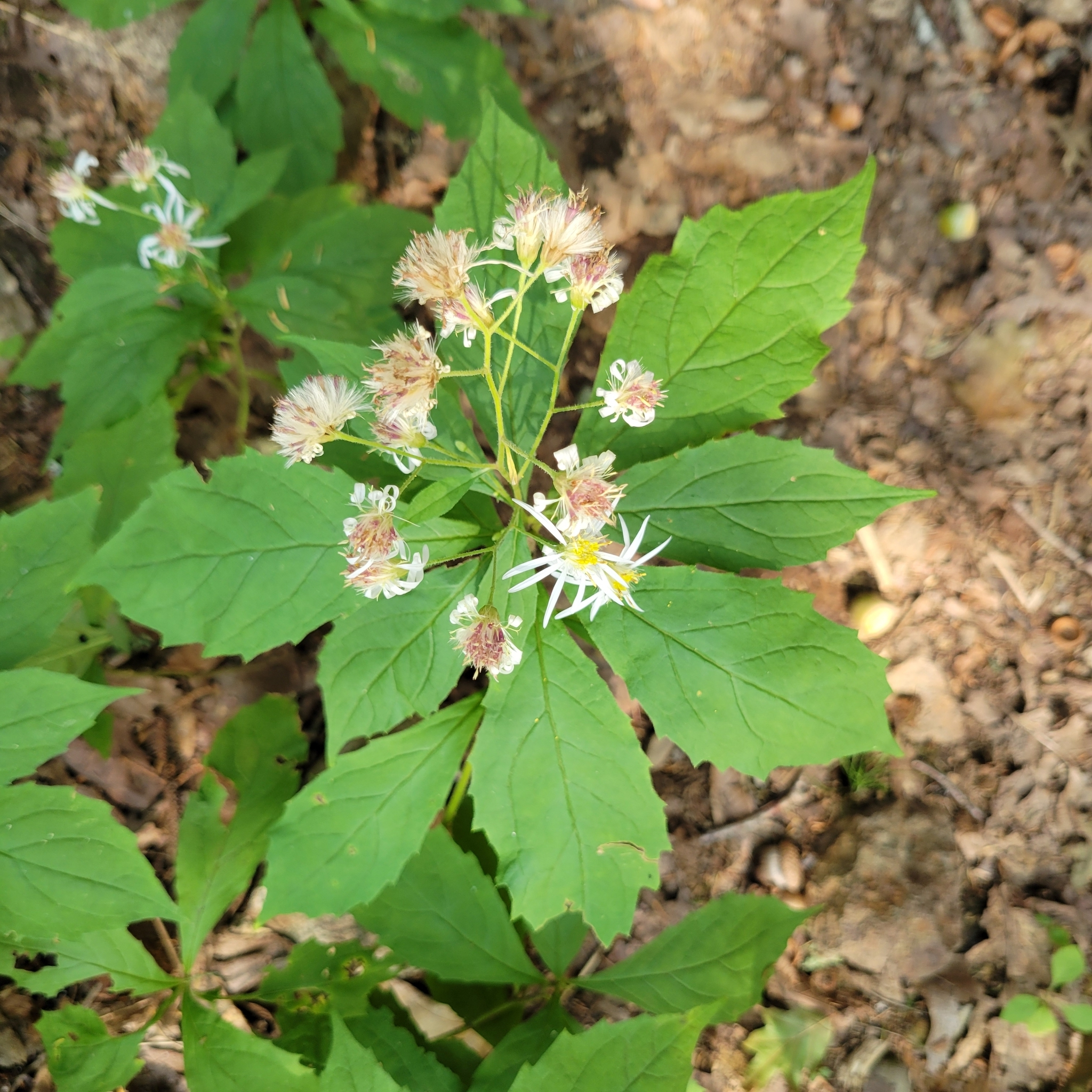
- Hancock County, Maine (September)

Conservation status
- Secure (NatureServe)

Scientific classification
- Kingdom: Plantae
- Clade: Tracheophytes
- Clade: Angiosperms
- Clade: Eudicots
- Clade: Asterids
- Order: Asterales
- Family: Asteraceae
- Genus: Oclemena
- Species: O. acuminata

Binomial name
- Oclemena acuminata (Michx.) Greene

Synonyms
- Homotypic synonyms: Aster acuminatus Michx.; Heterotypic synonyms: Aster acuminatus f. discoideus Kuntze; Aster acuminatus var. elatior Pursh; Aster acuminatus var. magdalenensis Fernald; Aster acuminatus var. pumilus Pursh; Aster acuminatus f. subdiscoideus Kuntze; Aster acuminatus f. subverticillatus Fernald; Aster acuminatus f. virescens Vict. & J.Rousseau; Aster divaricatus Lam.; Aster latifolius Banks ex Steud.; Diplostephium acuminatum DC.

= Oclemena acuminata =

Species of flowering plant

Oclemena acuminata, commonly known as whorled wood aster, is a species of flowering plant in the aster family Asteraceae. It is native to eastern North America. It is one of the parent species of the hybrid known as Blake's aster.

== Description ==
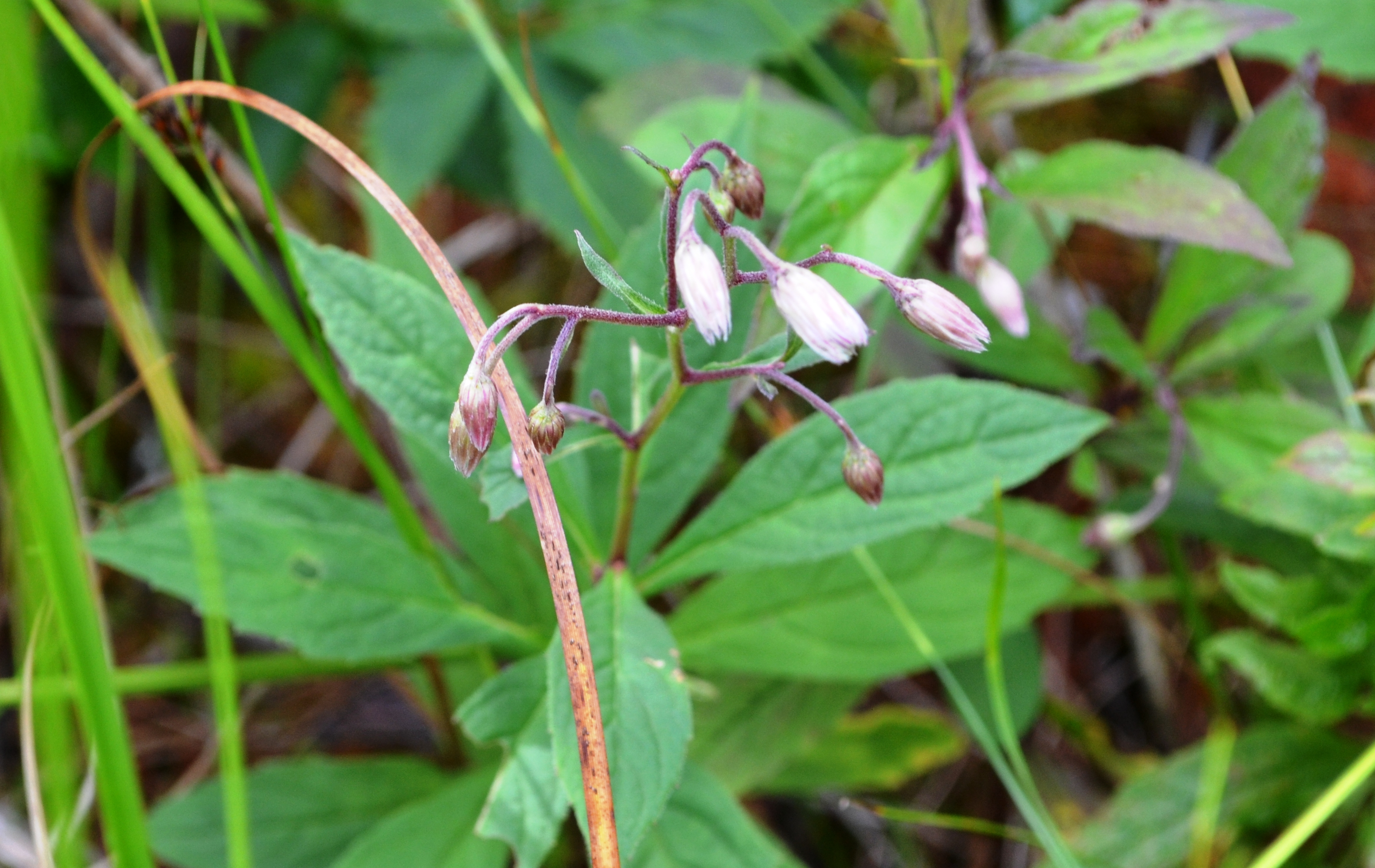
Nodding flower buds (August)

Oclemena acuminata is a perennial, herbaceous plant that propagates via a swollen tuber at the tip of a slender, elongated rhizome. It stands 10–80 cm (4–31 in) tall with 11–18 leaves clustered at the summit of the stem. Each leaf is 10–45 mm (0.4–1.8 in) wide with prominent teeth and flat margins. It has 5–46 flower heads (nodding in bud), each borne on a thin peduncle 0.9–4.5 cm (0.4–1.8 in) long. Each flower head has 15 ray flowers, white (or tinged with pink), and 14–30 disc flowers.

Oclemena acuminata is closely related to Oclemena nemoralis. Hybrid populations can occur wherever the parent species come in contact, that is, at the forest-bog ecotone. The hybrid is known as Blake's aster.

== Taxonomy ==
Oclemena acuminata was first described as Aster acuminatus by the French botanist André Michaux in 1803. The American botanist Edward Lee Greene transferred Aster acuminatus Michx. to genus Oclemena in 1903. As of December 2025, the botanical name Oclemena acuminata (Michx.) Greene is widely accepted.

== Distribution and habitat ==
Oclemena acuminata is native to eastern North America. Its range extends from Newfoundland in Canada to the U.S. state of Georgia.

== Bibliography ==
- Greene, Edward Lee (1903). "Further Segregates from Aster". Leaflets of Botanical Observation and Criticism. 1: 4–7.
- Nesom, Guy L. (1995). "Review of the taxonomy of Aster sensu lato (Asteraceae: Astereae), emphasizing the new world species". Phytologia. 77 (3): 141–297.
