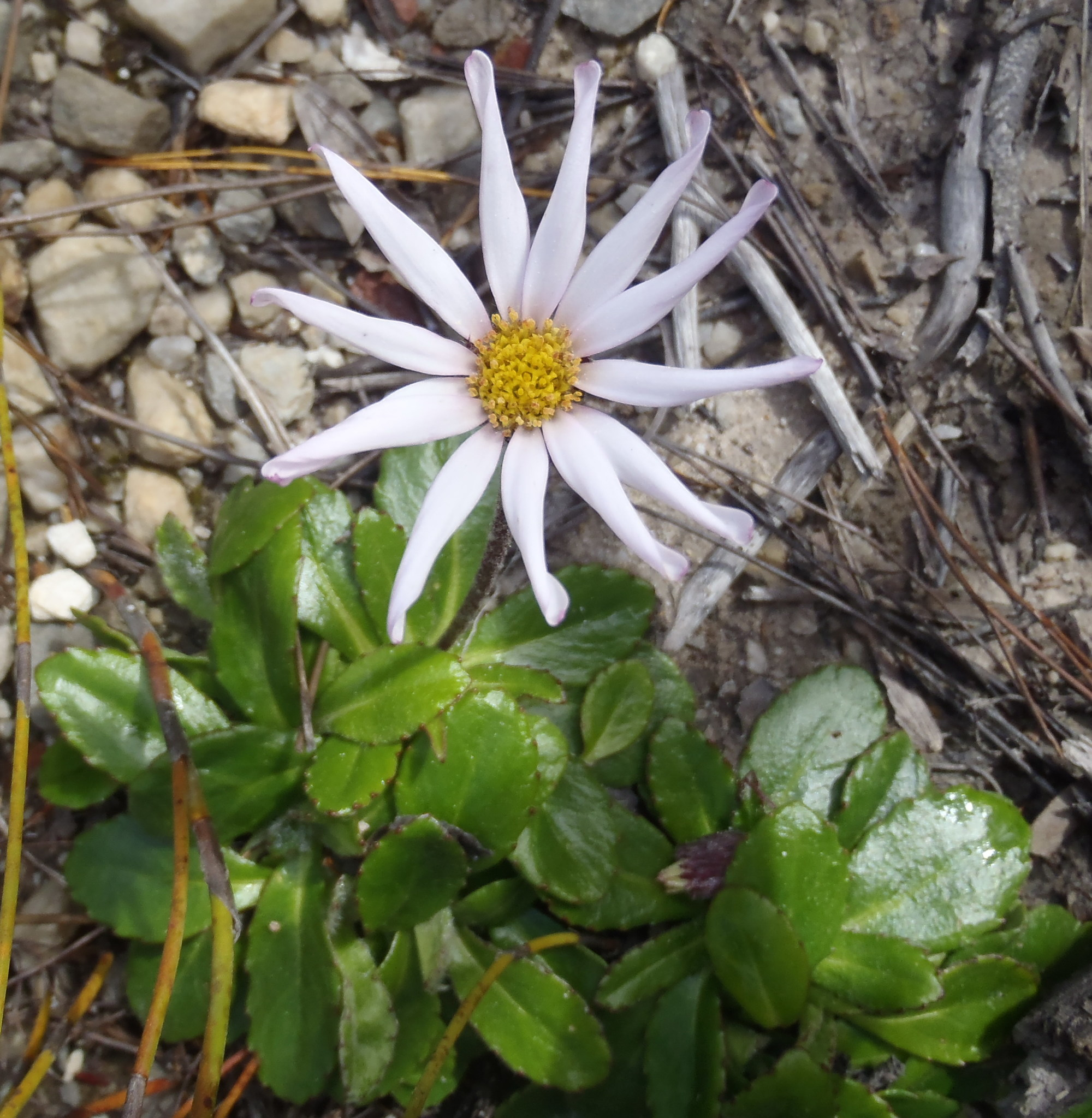
- Mairia crenata, photo: Nicola van Berkel

Scientific classification
- Kingdom: Plantae
- Clade: Tracheophytes
- Clade: Angiosperms
- Clade: Eudicots
- Clade: Asterids
- Order: Asterales
- Family: Asteraceae
- Subfamily: Asteroideae
- Tribe: Astereae
- Subtribe: Mairiinae; G.L.Nesom
- Genus: Mairia; Nees

Species
- M. crenata (type species); M. burchellii; M. coriacea; M. hirsuta; M. petiolata; M. robusta

Synonyms
- Alairia Kuntze

= Mairia =

Genus of plants in the daisy family from South Africa

Mairia is a genus of perennial herbaceous plants assigned to the family Asteraceae. All species have leathery, entire or toothed leaves in rosettes, directly from the underground rootstock, and one or few flower heads sit at the top of the stems that carry few bracts. These have a whorl of white to mauve ray florets surrounding yellow disc florets in the centre. In general, flowering only occurs after the vegetation has burned down. The six species currently assigned to Mairia are endemic to the Western Cape and Eastern Cape provinces of South Africa. Some of the species are called fire daisy in English and vuuraster in Afrikaans.

== Description ==
Mairia consists of species which store their reserves in their succulent brown underground roots (so-called geophytes). They have evergreen, broad to narrow, oval, elliptic or line-shaped, leathery, often more or less succulent leaves, narrowed at their base in to a leaf stalk that may be broadly winged, with an entire margin, slightly lobed, with few teeth or with regular rounded or pointy teeth. The leaves have one to five main veins, and the surface is very to lightly woolly or hairless, and may or may not carry glands. All leaves grow in a rosette directly from the woody rootstock in the ground.

From the rootstock also develop one or few initially woolly hairy, mostly dark reddish inflorescence stems (or scapes) with one to eight small bracts. These are mostly unbranched but may have up to eight branches in the upper half. Each of these are topped by one or few flower heads, with an involucre of bracts surrounding a flat to slightly concave common base, with clear pits where the ovary attach and without bracts at the foot of the individual florets. The involucre is bell- or cup-shaped or somewhat narrower at the rim. It consists of three, four or up to six whorls of bracts that are overlapping and mostly increase in size further in.

On the edge of the common base grows one whorl of white to mauve-coloured florets. Their corollas consist of a short tube at the base topped by a long, flat, ribbon-like ligule with four or sometimes up to seven veins. In the center of the tube is a forked style that has its receptive areas along the margin which do not meet at the tip, where there is a triangular appendage. The shaft of the style is mostly surrounded by five infertile stamens but these may be absent. Many yellow, funnel-shaped, star-symmetrical disc florets occupy the center of the flower head, often carry soft glands and carry five triangular lobes with a resin duct along the edge. The disc florets contain both ovaries topped by a forked style and five fertile anthers that form a tube around the style shaft. These anthers have triangular appendages at their tip, a blunt basis with or with a very short tail-like appendage.

The pale to dark brown, one-seeded, dry, indehiscent fruits (or cypselae) of both ray and disc florets are cylinder-shaped or somewhat flattened, carry apparently two, or four to seven narrow, mostly contrasting ribs, and are covered by shiny, yellow glands and deeply divided, silvery or golden twin hairs on a further unadorned surface. They carry at their tip the modified calyx called pappus that is yellowish white, persistent, and arranged in two whorls. The outer whorl consists of free, up to 3 mm (0.012 in) long, barbed or feathery bristles and an inner whorl of feathery bristles of up to 9 mm (0.36 in) long, that are merged into a ring at the base.

It has eighteen homologous sets of chromosomes (2n= 36).

== Taxonomy ==
The earliest known description of a species of fire daisy was by Carl Peter Thunberg, a Swedish naturalist who is sometimes referred to as "the father of South African botany". He named it Arnica crenata (now Mairia crenata). In 1833, Nees von Esenbeck erected a new genus Mairia, and took M. crenata as its type species. The genus was accepted by many later authors such as Augustin Pyramus de Candolle in 1836. William Henry Harvey in 1865 wrongly spelled the name as Mairea and extended the number of species to ten. The genus was also recognised by George Bentham in 1873, Hoffmann in 1889, and Edwin Percy Phillips in 1959. Robert Allen Dyer also spelled the name wrongly as Mairea in 1975. Kåre Bremer in 1994 included fourteen species and thought that Mairia should be included in his Amellus group (subtribe Asterinae). Guy L. Nesom and Harold E. Robinson in 2007 placed it in the primarily South-American subtribe Hinterhuberinae of the tribe Astereae. Close examination of the species assigned to Mairia at that time, led Jürke Grau in 1971, and Nesom in 1994 to reassign the many species without leaf rosettes. This left Mairia with only three species with leaf rosettes: M. crenata, M. coriacea and M. hirsuta. They considered the species they reassigned to Gymnostephium and Zyrphelis as more related to Amellus, Chrysocoma, Felicia and Polyarrhena, than to the species they retained in Mairia. This reassignment was confirmed by a comparison of homologous genes in 2009. Later two newly distinguished taxa were included in the genus, and one species, M. burchellii that was originally described by De Candolle, but had been reassigned to Zyrphelis by Harvey, was reinstated in Mairia by Ulrike Zinnecker-Wiegand in 1990. In 2011, Zinnecker-Wiegand, distinguished M. petiolata as well as M. hirsuta subsp. robusta. The latter was raised to species level by John Manning and Peter Goldblatt in 2012, so creating M. robusta. In 2016, Manning considered Cineraria purpurata synonymous to Mairia hirsuta, and consequently proposed the combination Mairia purpurata.

The genus was named in honour of Louis Maire, half of the South African collecting team of Mund and Maire.

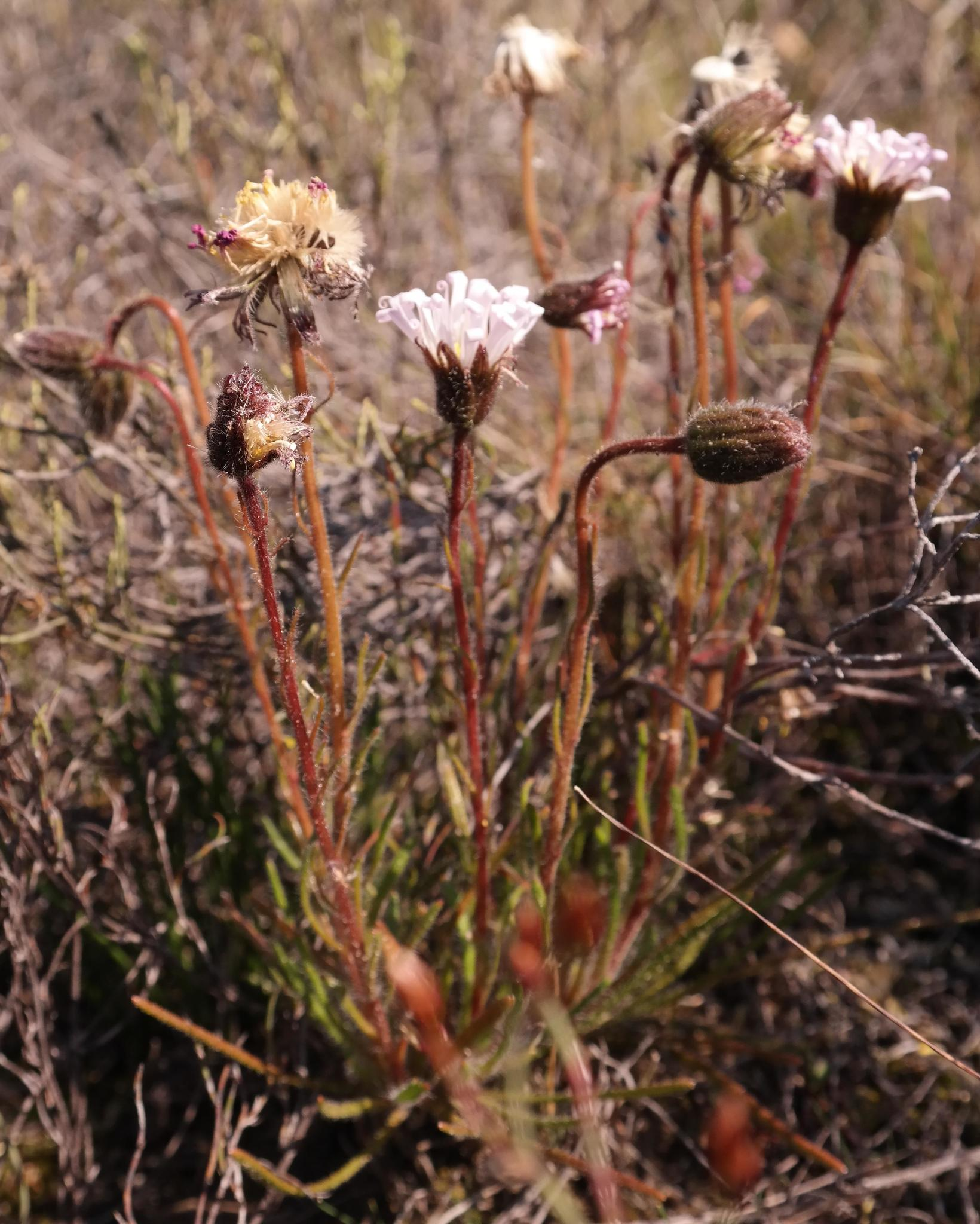
Mairia burchellii

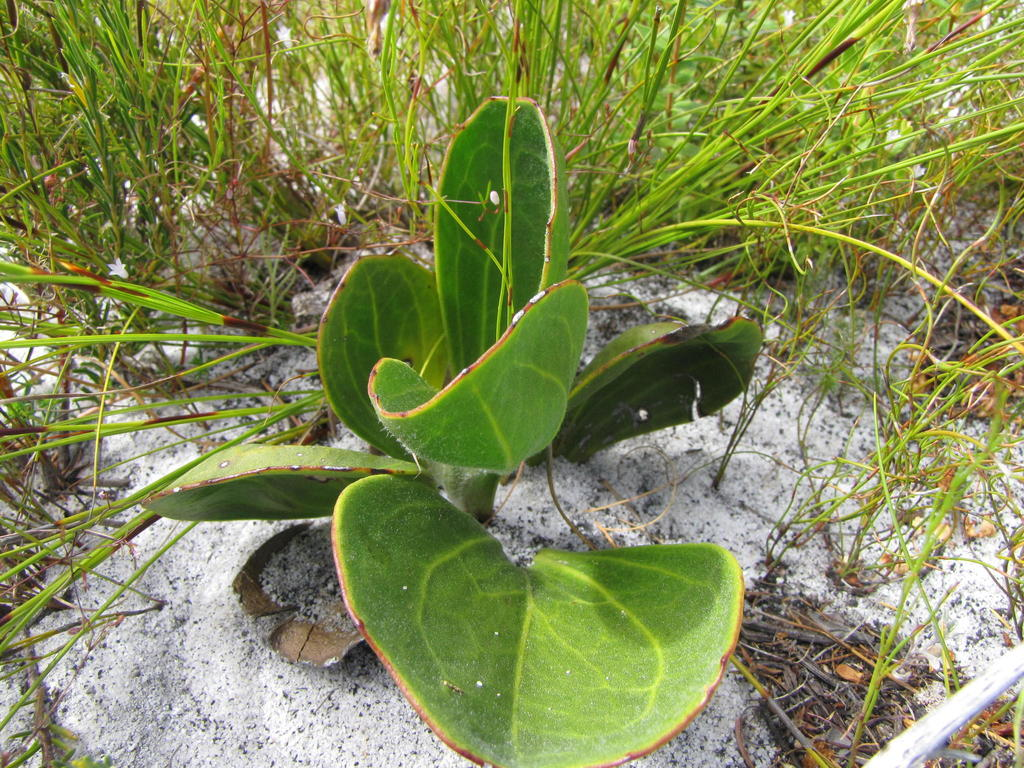
Mairia coriacea leaves

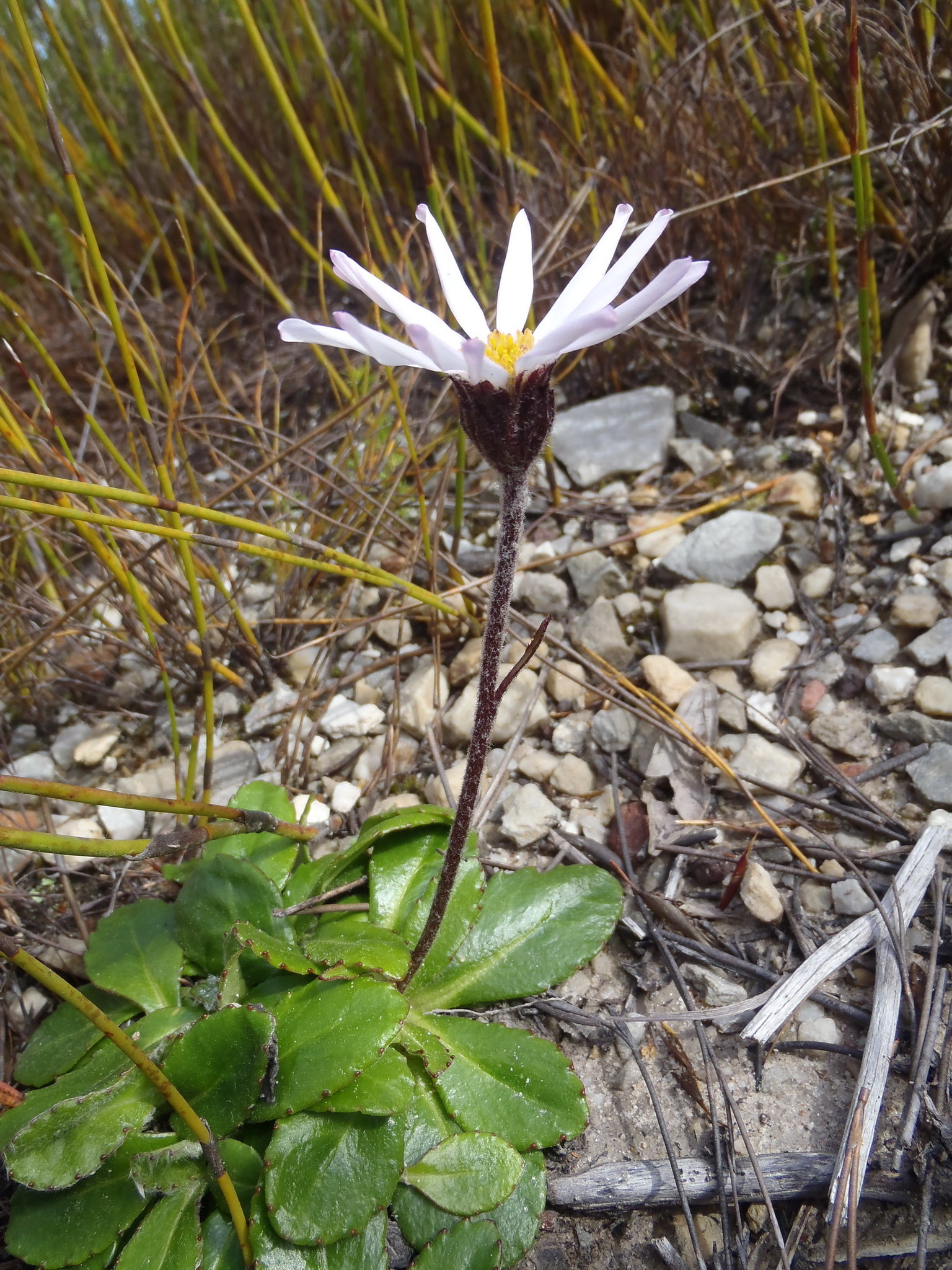
Mairia crenata

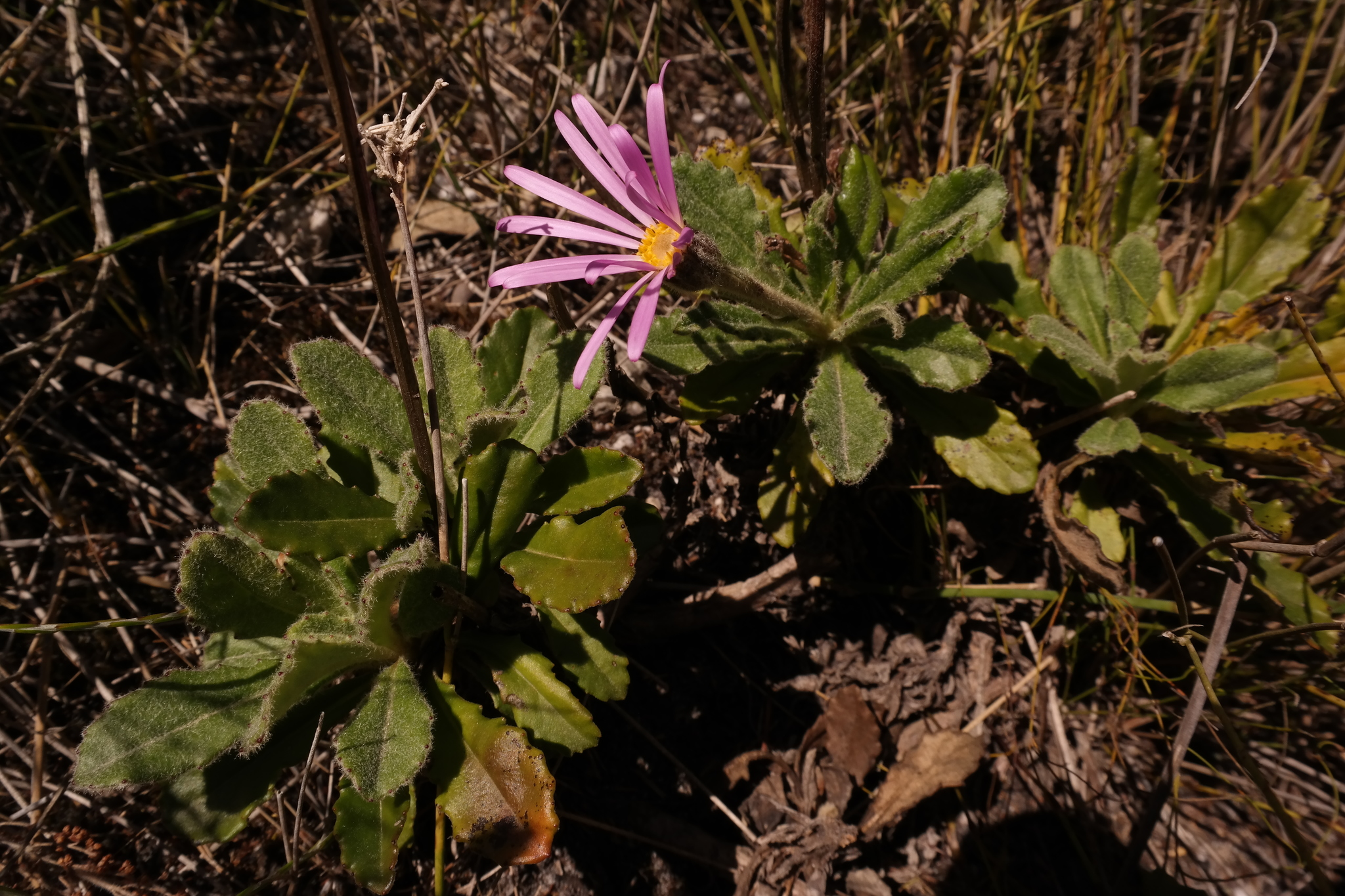
Mairia hirsuta

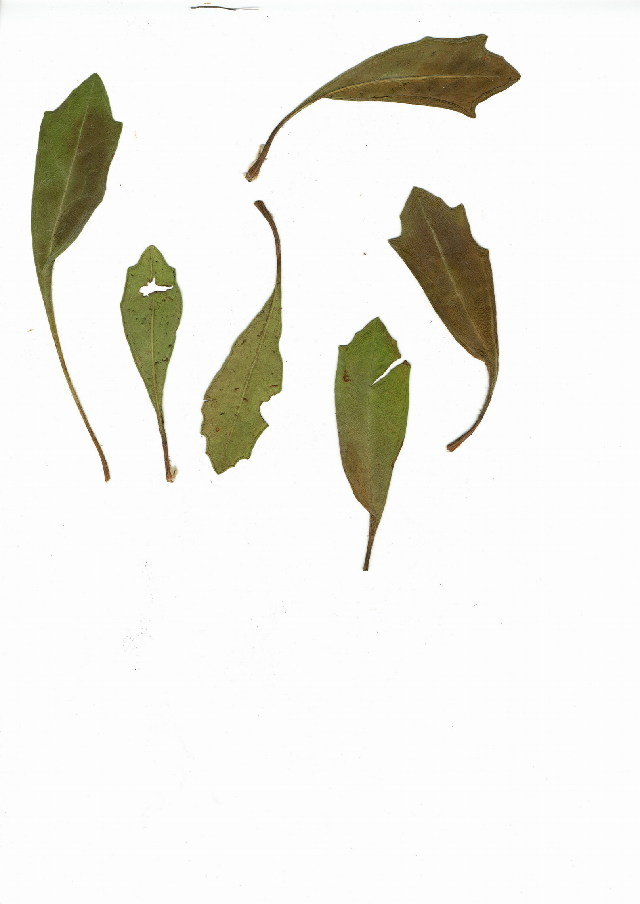
Mairia petiolata leaves

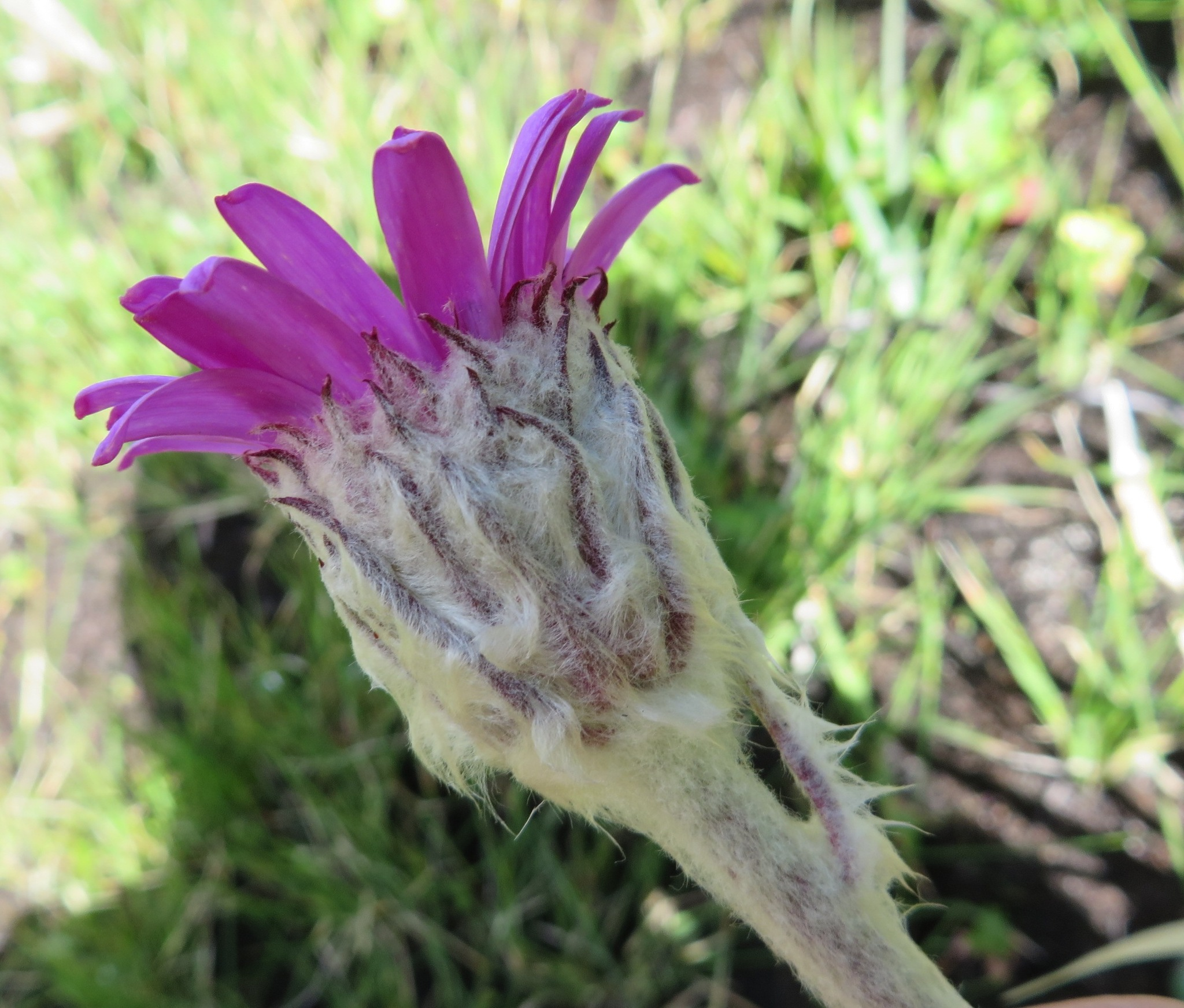
Mairia robusta

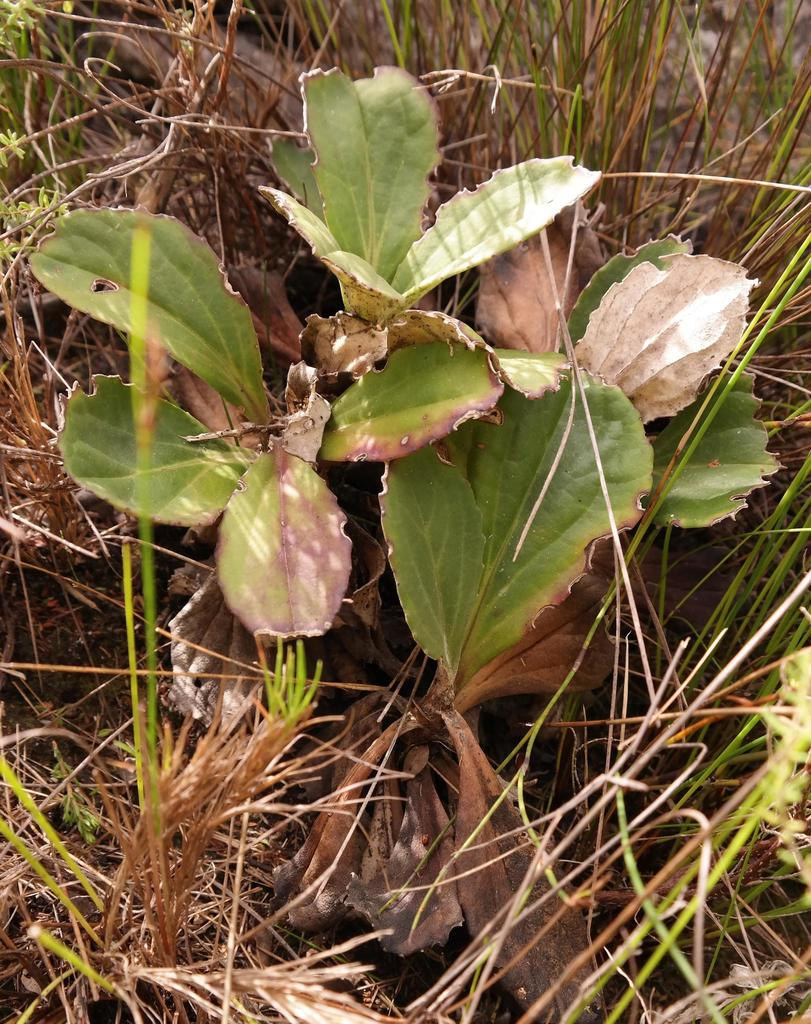
Mairia robusta leaves

=== Phylogeny ===
Comparison of homologous DNA has increased the insight in the phylogenetic relationships between the Astereae. It shows that Mairia likely diverges early in the history of this tribe. Since only one species of Mairia was included in this study, further research may change insights. The genus Zyrphelis to which the majority of species formerly included in Mairia have been reassigned, is much more related to Felicia and Chrysocoma than to the species that have been retained in Mairia. The following relationship tree represents current insights.

- supertribe Asterodae
  - tribes Anthemideae, Calenduleae, Gnaphalieae
  - tribe Astereae
    - - Printzia
      - Denekia
    - - Nannoglottis
      - - Mairia
        - - Chiliophyllum, Lepidophyllum, Llerasia, Nardophyllum, Novenia, Oritrophium
          - - Celmisia, Damnamenia, Olearia, Pachystegia, Pleurophyllum
            - - Pteronia
              - - Commidendrum, Melanodendron
                - Amellus, Chrysocoma, Felicia, Poeciliopsis, Polyarrhena, Zyrphelis
            - all other Astereae

=== Reassigned species ===
The species that were originally described as, or moved to Mairia, which since have been reassigned include the following:

- Mairia corymbosa = Gymnostephium papposum
- Mairia decumbens = Aster decumbens
- Mairia ecklonis = Zyrphelis ecklonis
- Mairia felicioides = Felicia ovata
- Mairia foliosa = Zyrphelis foliosa
- Mairia lasiocarpa = Zyrphelis lasiocarpa
- Mairia microcephala = Zyrphelis microcephala
- Mairia montana = Zyrphelis montana
- Mairia perezioides = Zyrphelis perezioides
- Mairia taxifolia = Zyrphelis taxifolia

== Distribution and ecology ==
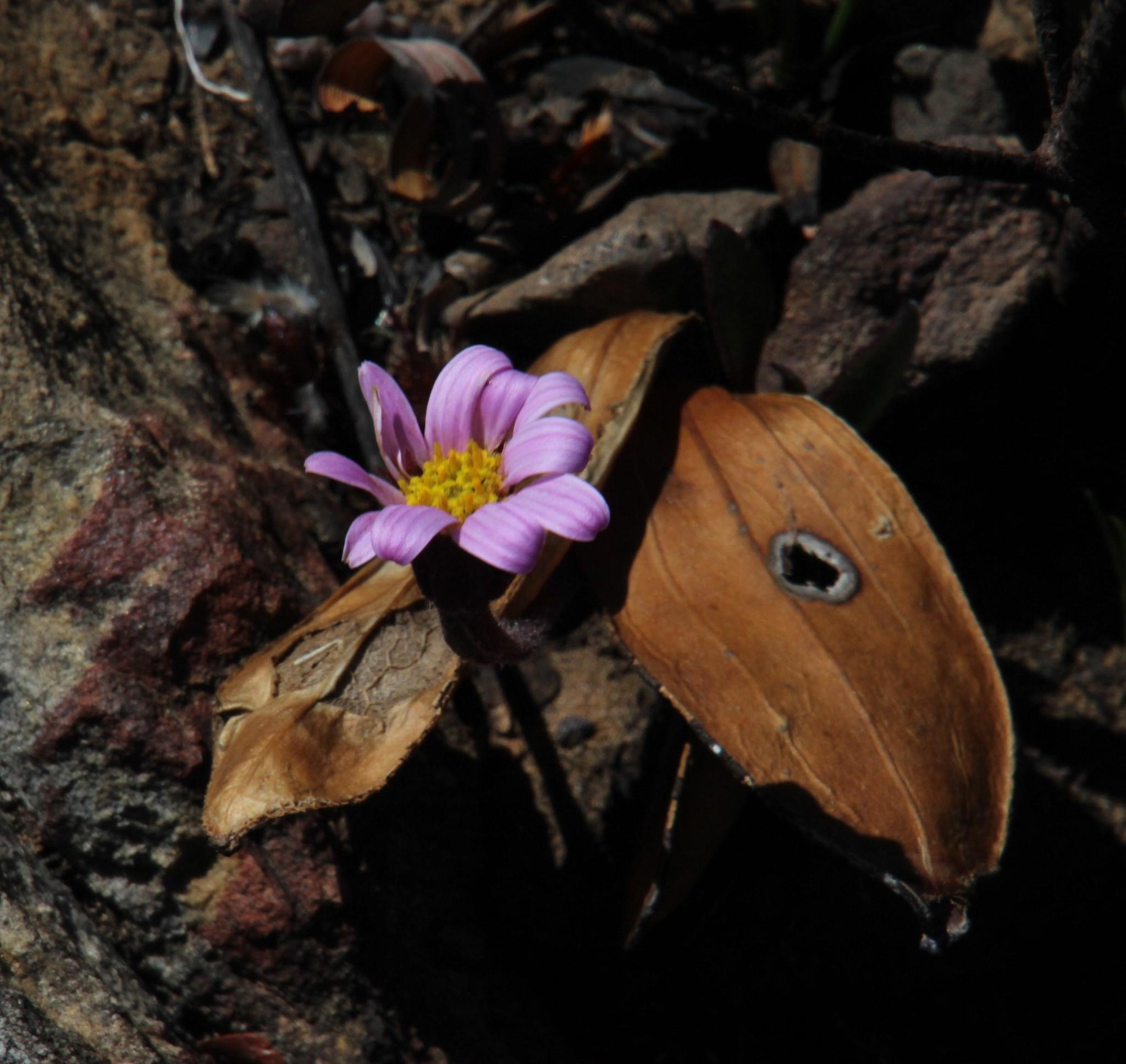
Mairia coriacea, flowering in a burnt veld

The six species of fire daisy are endemic to the southern mountains of the Western Cape province and the western end of the Eastern Cape province of South Africa. M. burchellii occurs from Piketberg and Ceres in the north, to the southern Cape Peninsula and the Hottentots Holland Mountains in the south, and eastwards to Bredasdorp. M. coriacea may be found between the southern part of the Cape Peninsula in the west, and the Hottentots Holland Mountains, following the coast past Cape Agulhas to the mouth of the Breede River at Witsand in the east. M. crenata has the largest distribution of any species of Mairia. It has an isolated population on Table Mountain. From Du Toitskloof Pass and the Hottentots Holland Mountains in the west, it can be found along the length of the Riviersonderend Mountains, the Langeberg, the Outeniqua Mountains and Tsitsikamma Mountains all the way to the Kouga Mountains on the eastern end. M. hirsuta has a rather limited distribution from near Swellendam to Suurbraak in the Langeberg, and in the isolated range of Warmwaterberg in the Little Karoo to the north. Only a single population of M. petiolata is known, just north of Swellendam in the Langeberg. M. robusta grows from Bainskloof in the north, along Stellenbosch Mountain and Hottentots Holland Mountains to the southern coast near the Kogelberg.

Mairia only flowers after a fire has burnt the overhead vegetation.

== Conservation ==
The continued survival of four species is considered of least concern: M. burchellii, M. coriacea, M. crenata and M. robusta, M. hirsuta is rare, and M. petiolata is critically rare.
