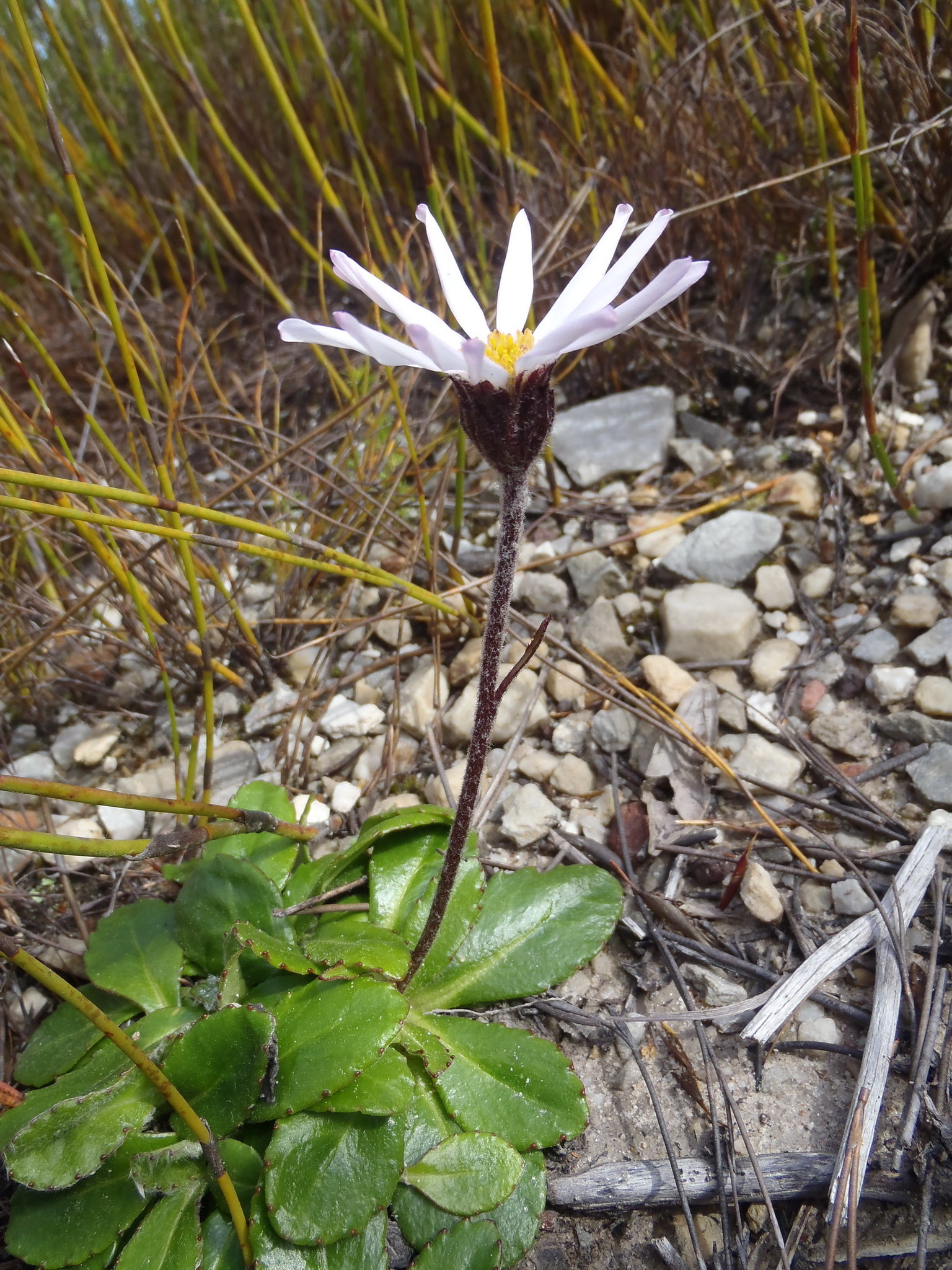

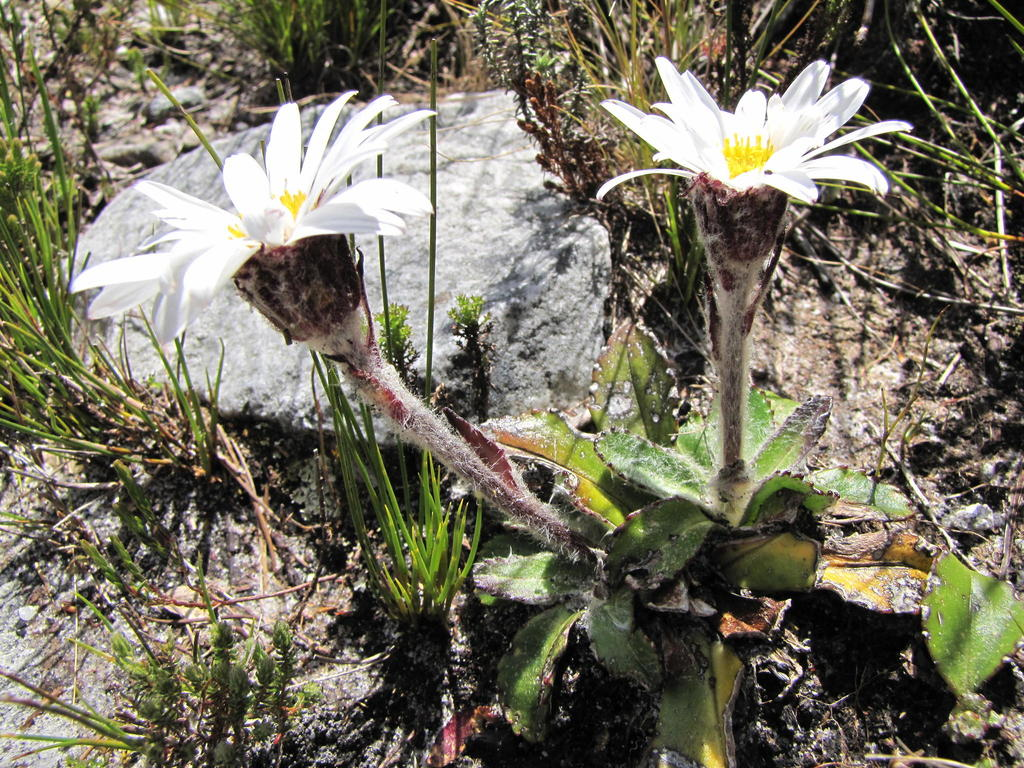

Scientific classification
- Kingdom: Plantae
- Clade: Tracheophytes
- Clade: Angiosperms
- Clade: Eudicots
- Clade: Asterids
- Order: Asterales
- Family: Asteraceae
- Genus: Mairia
- Species: M. crenata

Binomial name
- Mairia crenata (Thunb.) Nees

Synonyms
- Arnica crenata, Aster crenatus, Gerbera crenata, Zyrphelis crenata

= Mairia crenata =

Perennial plant in the daisy family from South Africa

Mairia crenata is a perennial herbaceous plant of mostly 2–15 cm (1–6 in) high that is assigned to the family Asteraceae. It has a woody rootstock of up to 5 cm (2 in) long, from which brown, fleshy roots develop. The five to eighteen, hard and leathery, spoon-shaped leaves are in one to three rosettes, have a distinct main vein, blunt or pointy tip, often dark red or blackish margins with rounded teeth and a 1/2–2 cm (0.2–0.8 in) long stalk-like foot, often initially somewhat woolly hairy, on particularly the lower surface and the main vein, but this is easily rubbed off the shiny surfaces. Each rosette produces mostly one, sometimes up to four, mostly rusty or whitish woolly hairy, brown or dark red inflorescence stalks, usually 1 1/2–15 cm (2/3–6 in) long, each with two to eight, initially woolly, line-shaped to oval bracts, the lowest up to 3 cm (1.2 in), decreasing size further up, and carrying mostly one, rarely up to three flower heads. The flower heads have a bell-shaped involucre with about 40 bracts, sixteen to thirty three violet to white ray florets of about 1 1/4–1 7/8 cm long, and many yellow disc florets. The species flowers anywhere between February and December but only after a fire has destroyed the overhead biomass or serious disturbance. It is an endemic species that is restricted to the Eastern Cape and Western Cape provinces of South Africa.

== Description ==
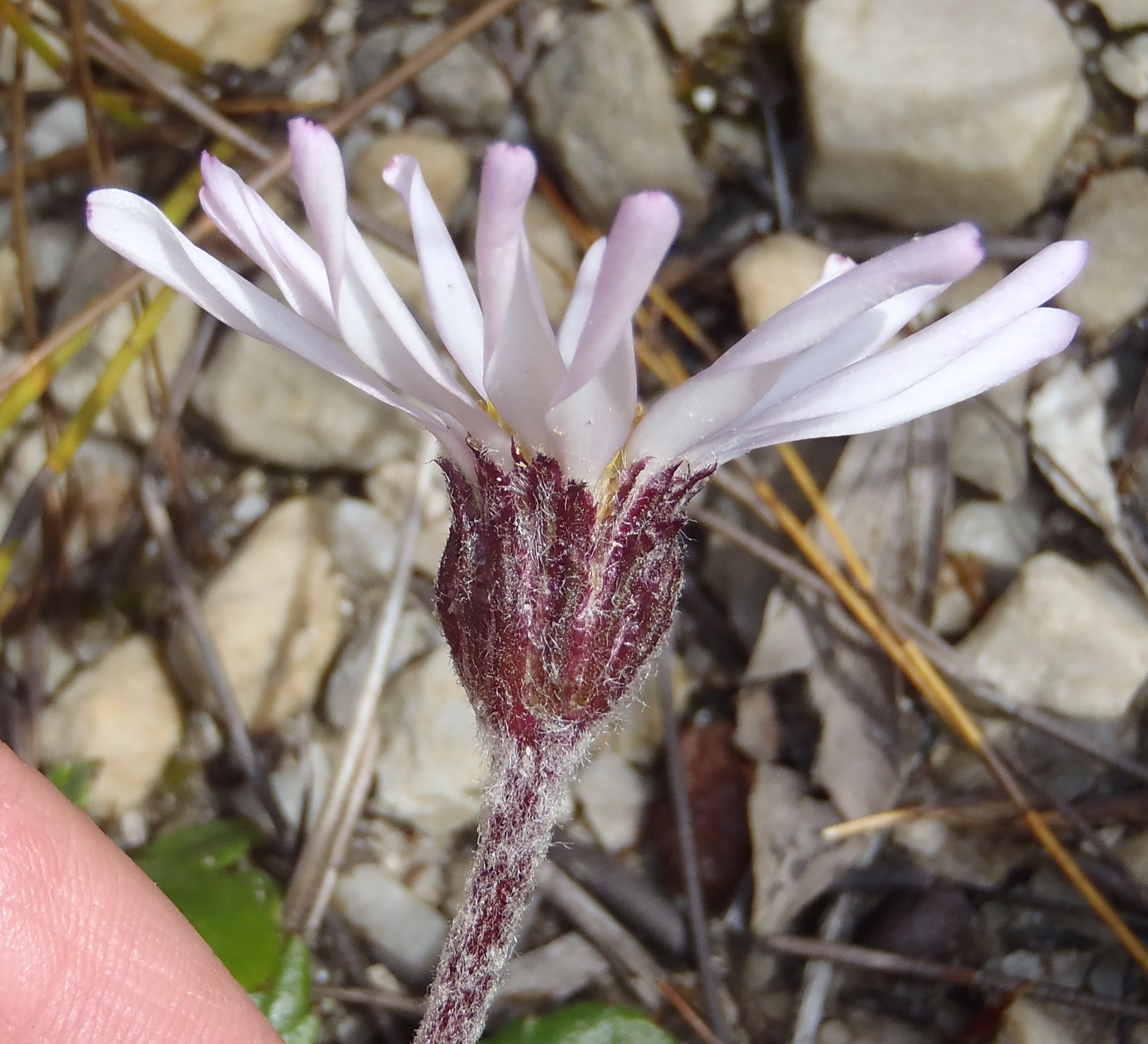
The involucre is mostly dark red and woolly hairy.

Mairia crenata is a geophytic perennial herb of variable height and hairiness. It is mostly 2–15 cm (1–6 in) high, but at low altitude and particularly towards the east it may sometimes reach 40 cm (16 in). It has a woody rizome of up to 5 cm (2 in) long, from which bright to dark brown, thick and fleshy roots appear, and one to three leaf rosettes. The five to seventeen hard leathery leaves may be somewhat succulent, are narrowed into a leaf stalk of 1/2–2 cm (0.2–0.8 in) long or less narrowed and have a distinct midvein. The axils of the leaves are often woolly. Mostly under an initial covering of some woolly hairs the surface of the leaf blade is shiny, ellipse-shaped, inverted oval, spoon-shaped, or almost circular, 2–4 1/2 cm (0.8–1.8 in) long and 1/2–2 1/2 cm (0.2–1.0 in) wide. The leaf tip may both be pointy or blunt. The leaf margin is flat or slightly curves down, and has evenly distributed rounded teeth with blackish red tips, rarely it is almost entire.

=== Inflorescences ===
From each leaf rosette, one, or sometimes up to four, brown to dark red, robust inflorescence stalks rise up to 1 1/2–15 cm (0.6–6 in) sometimes up to 40 cm (16 in), mostly initially covered with white or rusty woolly hairs, broadening close to the flower heads. Each has two to eight line-shaped to narrowly oval, entire or with rounded teeth, upright bracts, the lowest up to 3 cm (1.2 in), getting smaller further up, and carrying one, seldom two or three flower heads. The bracts that jointly surround the florets in the same head from a broadly bell-shaped involucre that may be narrowed at the rim, and is 1–1 1/4 cm (0.4–0.5 in) high and 1¾–2 1/2 cm (0.7–1.0 in) in diameter. The about forty overlapping bracts (full range 34–52), occur in approximately four whorls and are very variable in shape and size. Those in the outermost whorl are line-shaped to very narrowly ellipse-shaped, oval or inverted egg-shaped, 8–9 1/2 mm (0.32–0.38 in) long and 1 1/2–2¾ mm (0.06–0.11 in) wide, entirely dark red or only near the blunt or pointy tip, hairy along the margin which sometimes has a very narrow papery seam, and the surface sparsely set with long woolly hairs and glands. In the inner whorl, bracts are 11 1/2–12 mm (0.46–0.48 in) long and 1–2 mm (0.04–0.08 in) wide, entirely straw-coloured or purplish towards the pointy or stretched tip, with a papery margin and long hairs along the edges, the surface often initially with long woolly hairs, particularly near the tip and with glands.

=== Florets ===
Each flower head has 16–33 ray florets. The corolla is mauve, pink or white with a pink wash on the upper surface and nearer to the tip. The lower tube-shaped part is 5–6 mm (0.20–0.24 in) long has some glandular hairs. The flat upper part (or limb) is line-shaped, 1 1/8–1 7/8 cm (0.48–0.72 in) long, with four veins, ending with three teeth. The style of each ray floret is up to 6 1/2 mm (about 1/4 in) long, the upper 1 1/2 mm (0.06 in) is split into two line- to ellipse-shaped branches with blunt tips. Although functionally female, five staminodes can be found surrounding the style shaft. In the center of the head are many bisexual disc florets, consisting of a tube at their base of 5–7 mm (about 0.2–0.3 in) long, which is shorter than the pappus, with some irregularly spread glandular hairs, and five upright triangular lobes of 1–1 1/2 mm (0.04–0.06 in) long, and have a resin duct along their margin. The five anthers, which are, as is usual in the entire family Asteraceae, fused in a tube, are about 2–2 1/3 mm (0.08–0.09 in) long, with a triangular appendages at their tip and stick out after the florets wilt. The styles in the disc florets are 4 1/2–5 1/2 mm (about 0.2 in) long, the upper 1–1 1/2 mm (0.04–0.06 in) is split into two line- to ellipse-shaped branches with blunt tips.

=== Fruits ===
In both ray and disc florets, the brownish, one-seeded, indehiscent, dry fruits (or cypselae) are narrowly cylinder-shaped, 4–5 mm (0.16-0.20 in) long and 1 1/3–1 5/8 mm (0.05–0.06 in) wide. Under the microscope in transverse section, four ribs can be seen, but mostly the ribs are hardly visible and squashed closely together in pairs. The cypselae are covered in shiny yellow glands. They also have a dense covering of silky twin hairs of 0.27–0.35 mm long, with branches that are unequal in length, with long pointy tips, and one of the two basal cells is often broadened into a cone-shape. The pappus consist of two whorls. The outer whorl consists of free, robust, straw-coloured to dirty white bristles of 1–2 mm (0.04–0.08 in) long with short (or dentate) to very long teeth (or barbellate). The inner whorl, which alternates with outer series consists of straw-coloured to dirty white plume-like, 6–7 mm (0.24–0.28 in) long bristles, merged in a ring at their foot, barbed near the base, and longer than the corolla of the disc florets.

=== Differences with related species ===
M. crenata can be distinguished from its closest relatives by its mostly succulent, shiny leaves with a short leaf stalk and dark red, scalloped margins. The cypselae are flattened and appear 2-ribbed, which is different from the cypselae of other species, that have four to seven ribs. The leaves of M. hirsuta and M. crenata are quite similar and the species are easily confused. M. hirsuta is the larger species in all regards. M. crenata has ray florets of up to 1 7/8 cm long that have staminodes, while these may reach 2 7/8 cm in M. hirsuta and lack staminodes. In M. crenata, the ribs on the cypsela have the same colour as the rest of the surface while these are dark brown in M. hirsuta.

=== Variability ===
The leaf size and succulence as well as the length of the flower head stems are influenced by habitat and environmental factors, and may vary considerably. Plants growing on Table Mountain are mostly dwarfish and have very short flower head stalks and relatively small, succulent leaves. Further east and at lower elevation, such as at Ruitersbos, Tsitsikamma Mountains, Kouga Mountains and near Ladismith, leaves are thinner and the margins tend to be almost entire. At lower altitudes the length of the flower head stalks increases and can reach 40 cm (16 in).

== Taxonomy ==
This species of fire daisy was first described in 1800 by Carl Thunberg, based on a specimen he collected himself, and he named it Arnica crenata. In 1825, the English botanist John Lindley assigned the species to the genus Gerbera, creating the new combination G. crenata, in 1832 Christian Friedrich Lessing moved it to Aster, calling it Aster crenatus. In 1833, Nees von Esenbeck erected a new genus Mairia, and took Mairia crenata as the type species. Otto Kuntze in 1891 thought it best placed as Zyrphelis crenata. In 1990, Zinnecker-Wiegand revised the genera Zyrphelis, Gymnostephium and Maira, combining the species with leaf rosettes, like crenata, in Mairia.

== Distribution, habitat and ecology ==
M. crenata has the largest distribution of any species of Mairia. It has an isolated population on Table Mountain. From Du Toitskloof Pass and the Hottentots Holland Mountains in the west, it can be found along the length of the Riviersonderend Mountains, the Langeberg, the Outeniqua Mountains and Tsitsikamma Mountains all the way to the Kouga Mountains on the eastern end. It grows in fynbos vegetations on sandstone slopes.

== Conservation ==
Mairia crenata is considered a species of least concern, because it has a stable population and the mountainous locations where it occurs are not threatened by afforestation, agriculture or urban sprawl.
