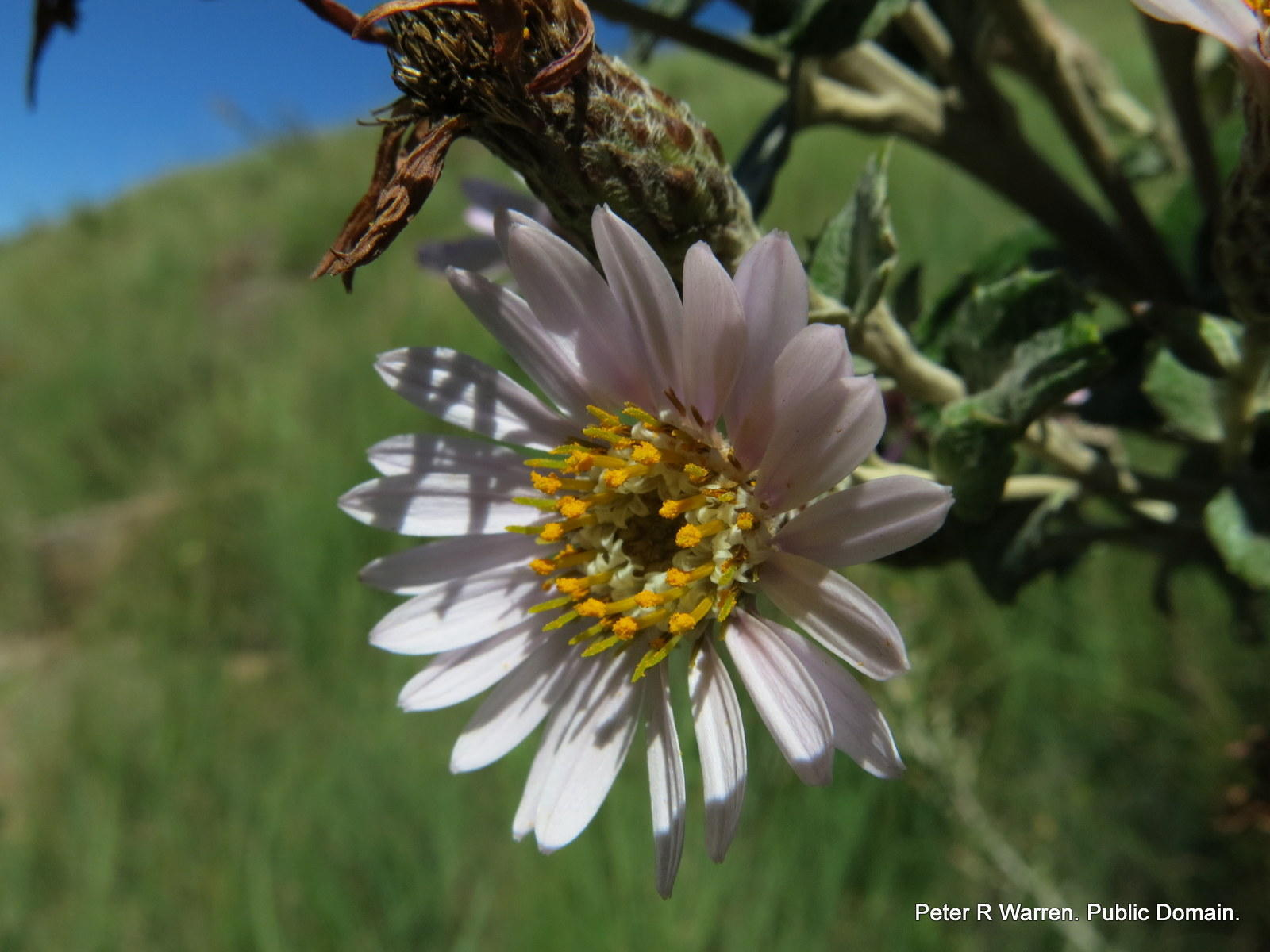

Scientific classification
- Kingdom: Plantae
- Clade: Tracheophytes
- Clade: Angiosperms
- Clade: Eudicots
- Clade: Asterids
- Order: Asterales
- Family: Asteraceae
- Genus: Printzia
- Species: P. pyrifolia

Binomial name
- Printzia pyrifolia Less.

= Printzia pyrifolia =

Species of plant

Printzia pyrifolia is a species of plant from South Africa.

== Description ==
This erect and sparsely branched shrub grows to be up till 1.6 m (5.2 ft) tall. The oval shaped and alternately arranged leaves grow directly on the stem or on short stems. They have finely toothed margins. The upper surface is hairless while the lower surface is densely covered in felt-like white or grey hairs. Flowers are present between December and May. Dense flowerheads grow on the ends of branches and are surrounded by many rows of hairy bracts. The ray (outer) florets are white or purple. The disc inner) florets are white, yellow or purple. The outer layer of floral leaves are covered in bristles. The brown seeds are conical, ribbed and hairy.

== Distribution and habitat ==
This species grows in South Africa. It grows in damp areas, commonly near rivers and streams. It grows on rocky grasslands on mountain slopes.
