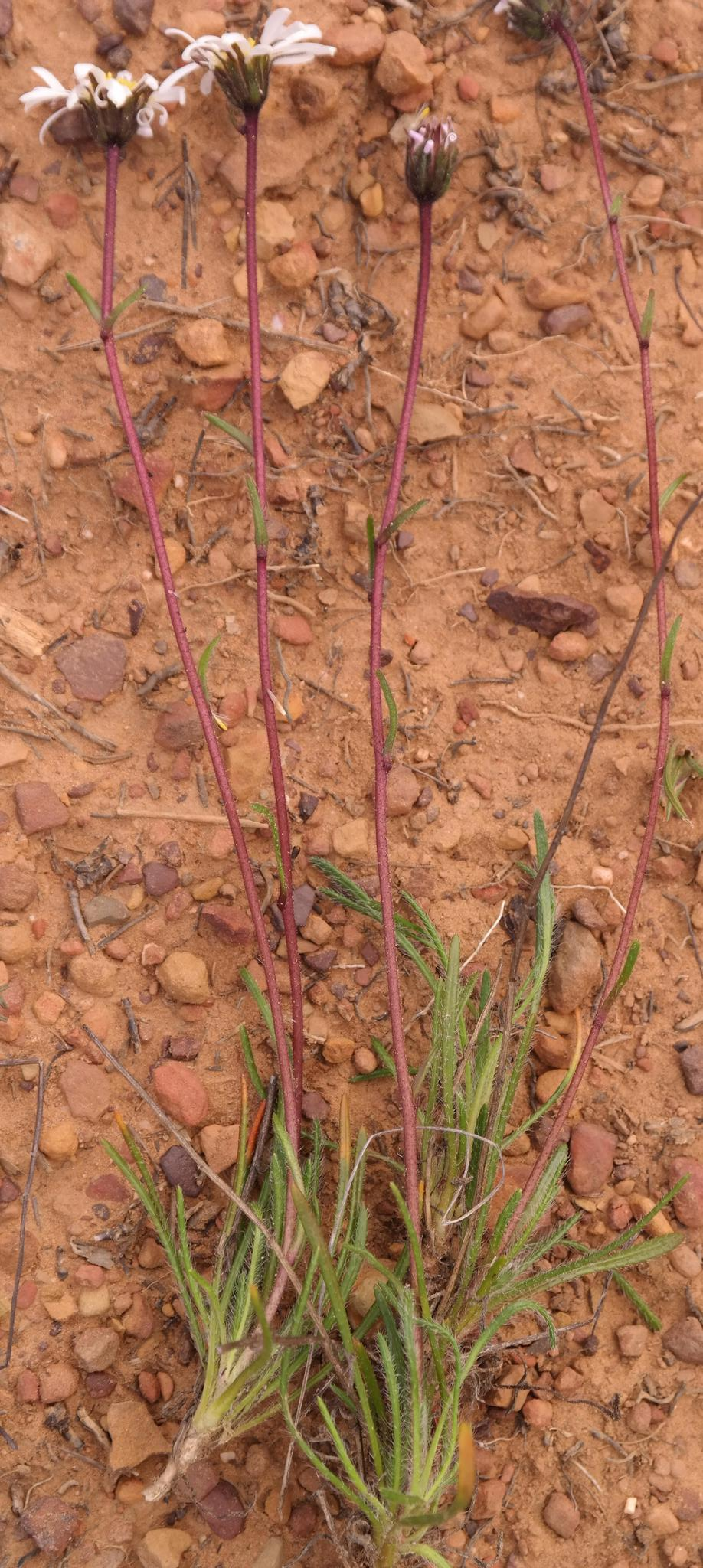

Scientific classification
- Kingdom: Plantae
- Clade: Tracheophytes
- Clade: Angiosperms
- Clade: Eudicots
- Clade: Asterids
- Order: Asterales
- Family: Asteraceae
- Genus: Mairia
- Species: M. burchellii

Binomial name
- Mairia burchellii DC.

Synonyms
- Zyrphelis burchellii

= Mairia burchellii =

Perennial plant in the daisy family from South Africa

Mairia burchellii is a tufted perennial plant of up to 15 cm (6 in) assigned to the family Asteraceae. It has narrow leaves of up to 5 mm (0.20 in) wide, with single main vein and an entire margin. Flower heads only occur after a fire has destroyed the standing vegetation, mostly in November or between February and June. The flower heads sit individually or with a few on the tip of a purplish stalk, with a few narrow bracts, and consist of a row of pinkish ray florets around many yellow disc florets. It can be found in the southwest of the Western Cape province of South Africa.

== Taxonomy ==
As far as known, this species of fire daisy was first collected by William John Burchell, in 1832, east of Cape Town, and described in 1836 by the Swiss botanist Augustin Pyramus de Candolle, who named it Mairia burchellii. Otto Kuntze reassigned it, making the combination Zyrphelis burchellii in 1891. In 1990, Ulricke Zinnecker-Wiegand in her dissertation made a clear distinction between the genera Mairia and Zyrphelis, and moved it back to Mairia. Later, comparison of homologous DNA showed that Mairia and Zyrphelis are not closely related.

== Description ==
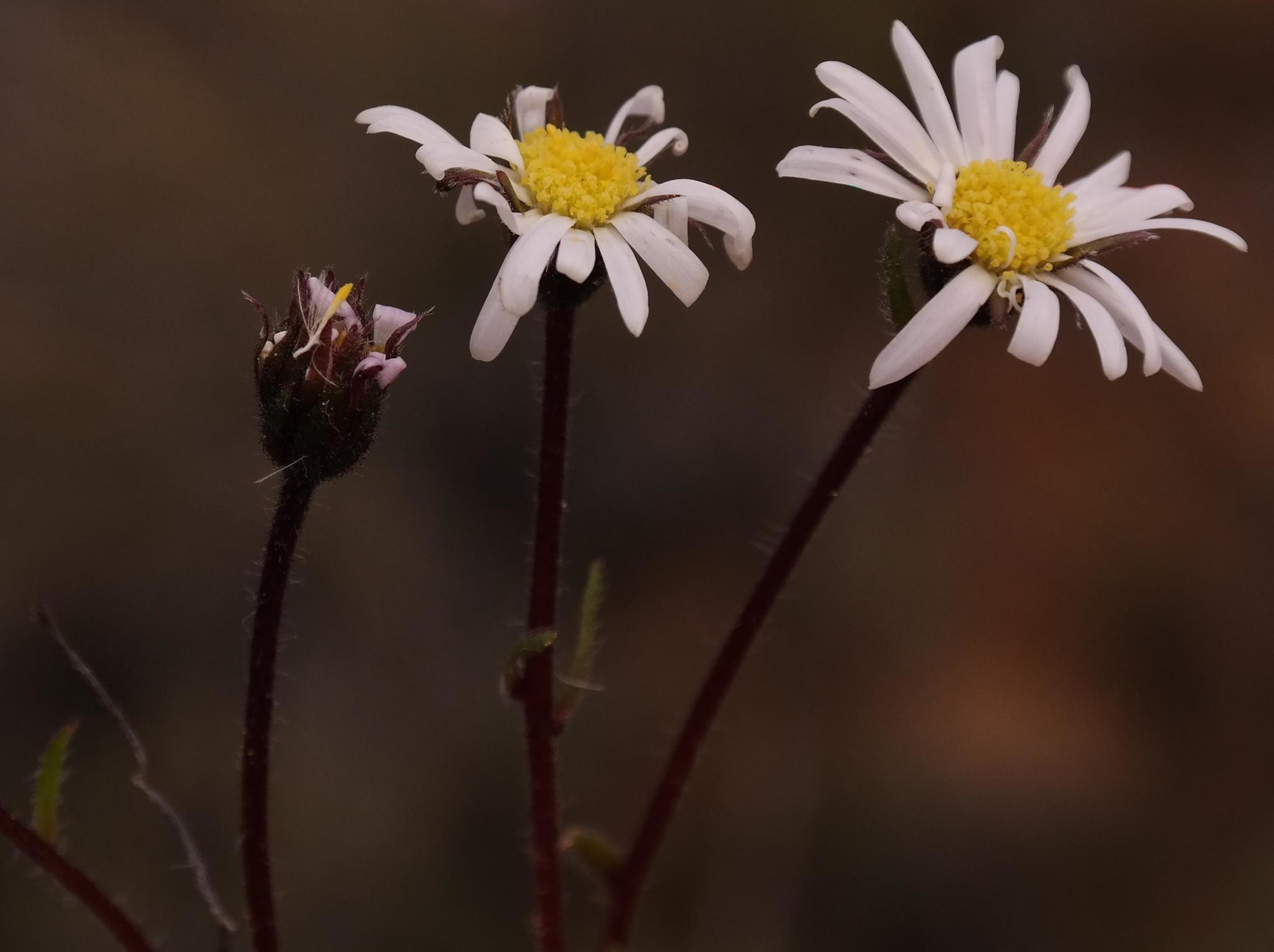
flower heads

Mairia burchellii is a perennial herbaceous plant of up to 16 cm (6 1/2 in) high. It has a robust rhizome, that sprouts up to thirty five succulent, dark brown or sepia-coloured roots of up to 20 cm (8 in) long and 2–4 mm (0.079–0.157 in) thick. Often, the charred remains of the bases of old leaves are present. The bright lime green to reddish-brown leaves have a leathery consistency and are all set in a rosette. Their number varies strongly over time from none or few to up to thirty during flowering. The firm, upright leaf blades are line-shaped, narrowly ellipse-shaped or very narrowly inverted egg-shaped, 4–12 cm (1 3/5–4 4/5 in) long and 2–5 mm (0.079–0.197 in) wide, with a pointy tip and at the base gradually narrowing to a very long leaf stalk. Both surfaces of the leaf blade are hairless, except for the inner side of the leaf stalk that is set with silvery woolly hairs. The leaves have entire, flat margins or these are rarely rolled downwards, with single main vein and sometimes with two indistinct marginal veins.

From each plant, between one and seven inflorescence stalks emerge, that each carry between one and eight flower heads each on a relatively long flower head stalk, together 6–16 cm (2 2/5–6 1/5 in) long. The inflorescence stalks are mostly branched near the base, and both the common and individual stalks are dark red-brown to dark purplish, strongly ribbed, with some silvery woolly hairs, mostly with glandular hairs, and carrying many, dark purple, very narrowly ovate bracts. The lower bracts are up to 2 1/2 cm (1 in) long, but decrease in size higher up, almost clutch the stem, and are densely set with silvery woolly hairs in the axils and glandular hairy elsewhere.

=== Flower heads ===
The involucre is broadly bell-shaped or more like a spinning top, 11–16 mm (0.43–0.63 in) high and 14–20 mm (0.55–0.79 in) in diameter. It consists thirty to thirty four purplish bracts, with a pointy or tapering tip, that are arranged in three or four overlapping whorls, the surfaces with glands and further variably woolly or hairless, fringed by a row of long hairs. The outermost bracts are narrowly oval, 4–6 mm (0.16–0.24 in) long and 1–1 1/2 mm (0.04–0.06 in) wide. The innermost bracts are narrowly inverted egg-shaped to narrowly ellipse-shaped, 8–10 mm (0.31–0.39 in) long and 1 1/2–2 mm (0.06–0.08 in) wide, with a papery margin and a fringe of long hairs.

The involucre envelops the base of fourteen to sixteen bright violet, pink, mauve or white ray florets of about 9 mm (0.35 in) long, with a tube that sometimes carries some glandular hairs, and a mostly line-shaped strap, with four to six veins and ending in three teeth. The style of the ray florets is 5–6 mm (0.20–0.24 in) long and the two branches in which it splits near the tip are often purplish, elliptic in shape, often uneven or with several 1 1/2–2 mm long with a blunt tip. The ray florets contain staminodes that do not produce pollen. The ray florets encircle many yellow disc florets with a corolla of 6–7 mm (0.24–0.28 in) long, not or scarcely longer than pappus, the tube nearer the base hairless or with some scattered glandular hairs, the five lobes at the top mostly recurved and loosely hairy.

The disc florets contain both ovaries topped by a forked style and five fertile anthers that form a tube around the style shaft. These anthers are 1.2–1.6 mm (0.047–0.063 in) long, and have narrowly triangular appendages at their tip. The style of the tube florets is 5 1/2–6 mm (0.22 in) long and extend beyond the mouth of the floret. The style branches are dark red or purplish in colour, elliptic in shape, 0.7–1.4 mm (0.028–0.055 in) long, sometimes unevenly malformed or there are even three branches. The appendages at the tip of each style branche are deltoid in shape, about 0.3 mm (0.012 in) wide and 0.2 mm (0.0079 in) long. The corollas of both ray and disc florets are surrounded by a row of hairs called pappus. The eventually dark brown, dry, one-seeded, indehiscent fruits called cypselae are cylindrical to spindle-shaped, about 7 1/2 mm long and 1.8 mm (0.071 in) wide, with four to seven prominent, narrow, cream-coloured ribs. The cypselae are covered with many shiny yellowish glands. These are also covered in long, silvery silky or dull yellow or brownish twin hairs of about 0.4–0.8 mm (0.016–0.031 in) long, which have distinctly unequally long, pointy branches. The pappus is arranged in two whorls. The outer whorl consists of a few delicate, smallish, dirty white or straw-coloured, free, barbed bristles of up to 3 mm (0.12 in) long. The colour of the inner pappus is the same, although sometimes with a pale purple wash. It consists of barbed, feathery bristles of 6 1/2–8 mm (1/4–1/3 in) long, that form a ring at the very base.

=== Differences with other Mairia species ===
M. burchellii is recognised by the rigid, erect, often dark red or brownish, linear or narrowly elliptic or very narrowly obovate leaves. During flowering time, (January) February to May (June), no or at most two leaves are present, as the leaves from the previous growing season are burnt down and only the spiky petiole-like bases are persistent. In M. burchellii, as in M. coriacea, flowering is induced by fire. Plants collected before or long after flowering, usually have many leaves (up to 30) and leaves are only present from June onwards. Plants of M. burchellii without leaves resemble M. coriacea plants without leaves and it is almost impossible to separate the two taxa in this condition. M. burchellii can be distinguished from M. coriacea by the linear or narrowly elliptic or very narrowly obovate leaves with a single main vein and entire margins; in M. coriacea, the leaves are mostly obovate, sometimes elliptic to broadly elliptic with 3 to 5 main veins and entire or apically few, broad dentate margins. Although M. coriacea mostly has solitary or 2-headed synflorescences while M. burchellii usually has corymbosely arranged capitula, solitary capitula are also sometimes found in M. burchellii.

== Distribution, habitat and ecology ==
Mairia burchellii can be found in the wild only in the southwest of the Western Cape province of South Africa, from Ceres and the Piketberg in the north to the southern tip of the Cape Peninsula in the west, through the Hottentots Holland Mountains, east to Bredasdorp on the Angulhas plains. It grows in fynbos vegetation, on stony and sandy plateaus and mountain slopes.

== Conservation ==
The continued survival of Mairia burchellii is considered to be of least concern, because it has a stable population that is widespread in mountainous areas and where it is not threatened.
