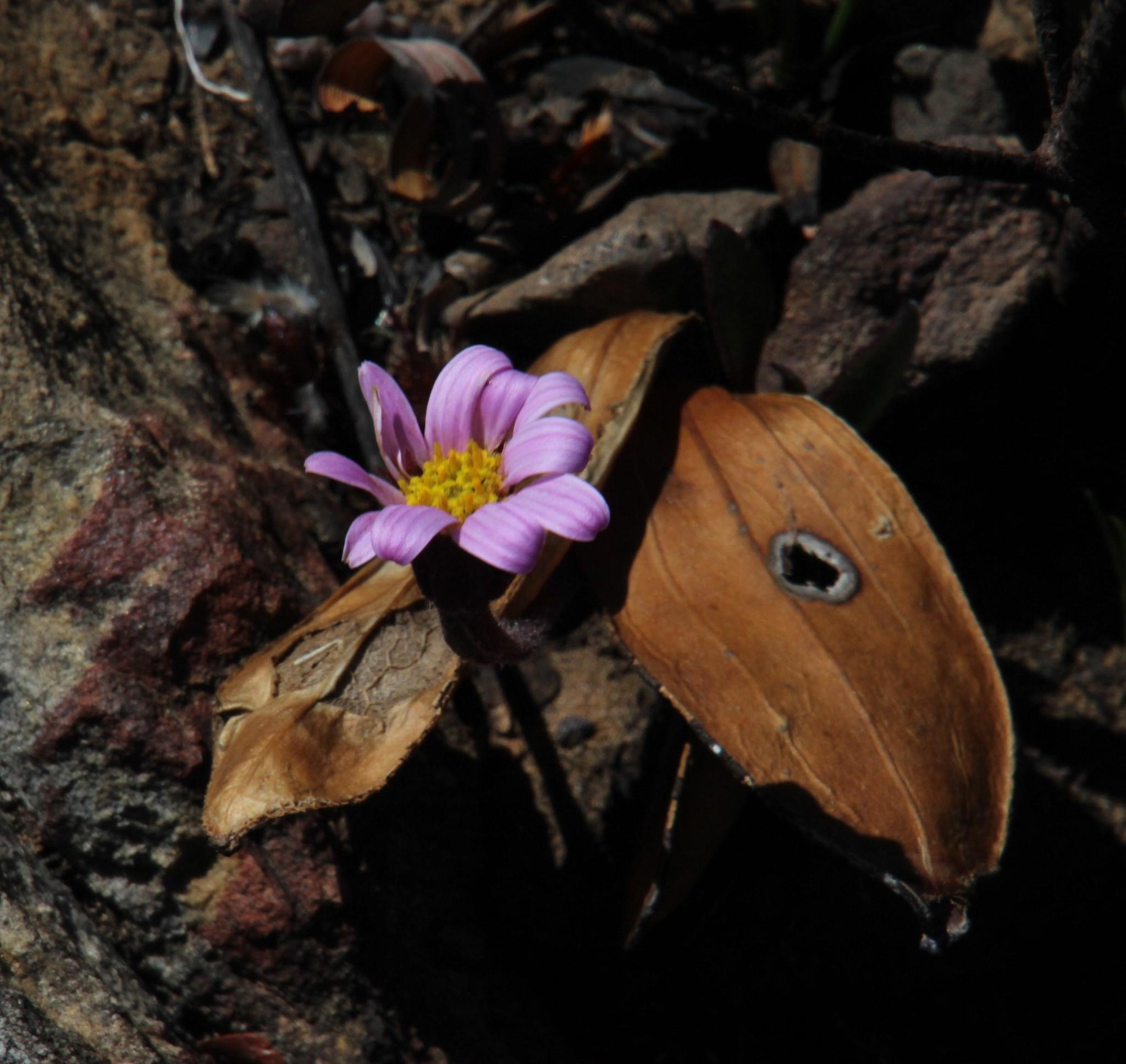
- Photos: Tony Rebelo and Nick Helme
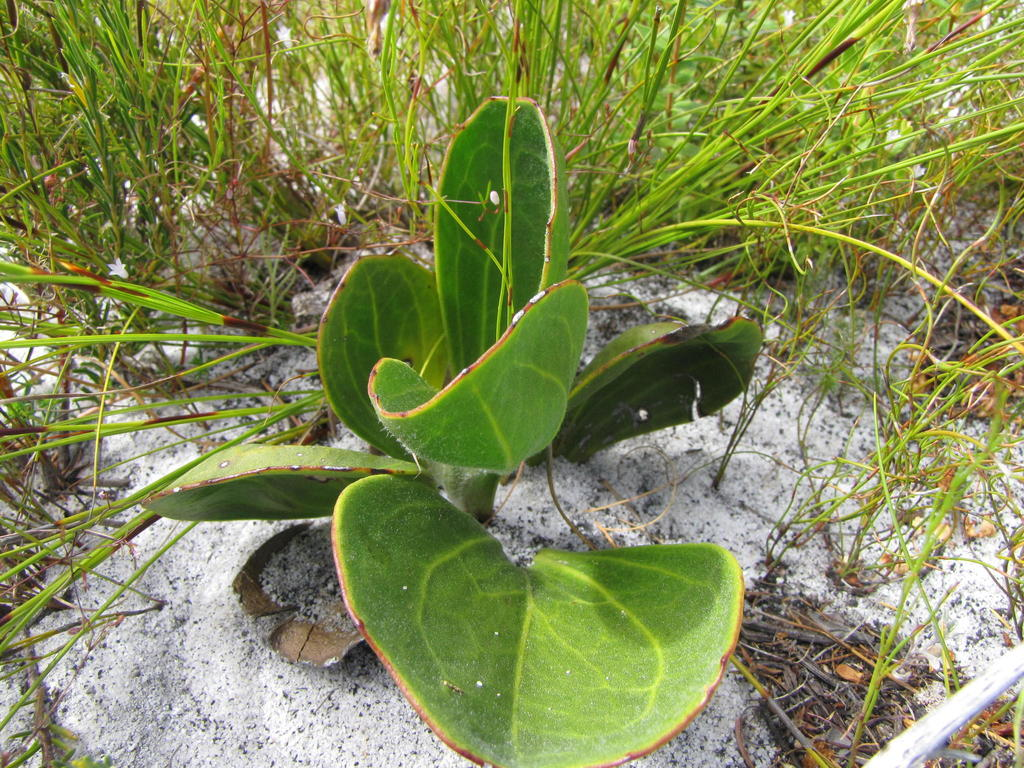

Scientific classification
- Kingdom: Plantae
- Clade: Tracheophytes
- Clade: Angiosperms
- Clade: Eudicots
- Clade: Asterids
- Order: Asterales
- Family: Asteraceae
- Genus: Mairia
- Species: M. coriacea

Binomial name
- Mairia coriacea Bolus

= Mairia coriacea =

Perennial plant in the daisy family from South Africa

Mairia coriacea is a perennial plant assigned to the family Asteraceae. It has broad, tough and leathery, evergreen leaves. These have a narrowed foot and an entire margin or a few shallow, irregular teeth. They grow in a rosette directly from the rootstock. The plant produces flower heads with one whorl of white to mauve ray florets around many yellow disc florets, with one or few on top of a dark reddish, woolly stalk. Flower heads appear after the overhead vegetation burnt down, often destroying the leaves in the process. It can be found in the southern mountains of South Africa's Western Cape province. It is called leather leaves in English.

== Taxonomy ==
A specimen of leather leaves was collected by Harry Bolus in December 1894, on a mountain slope behind Houhoek, Caledon County, at an altitude of about 1,100 m (3,600 ft). He called it Mairia coriacea in 1899. There are no synonyms known for this name.

Common names that are in use for several Mairia species, including fire aster in English and pluimaster in Afrikaans, but the name leather leaves is only applied to Mairia coriacea.

== Description ==
Mairia coriacea is a geophytic perennial herb of about 12 cm (4 4/5 in) high, with dense, silky, orange brown hairs on its growing points. It has a rizome with succulent, dark brown to black roots of up to about 20 cm (8 in) long and 3–4 mm (0.12–0.16 in) thick. It usually has up to about six leathery, bright lime-green leaves per growing point, which are seated or have a leaf stalk of up to 10 cm (4 in) long, and are flat or curve downwards. The leaf blade is mostly inverted egg-shaped, sometimes elliptic or broadly elliptic, 6–23 cm (2 2/5–9 in) long and 3–21 cm (1 1/5–8 1/5 in) wide. The leaf's tips vary from blunt to pointy, the thickened margins are usually entire or may have some broad teeth towards the tip. The leaves each have mostly five, slightly curved main veins, interconnected by a net of distinct secundairy veins. The leaf surfaces are variably hairy: hairless on both surfaces or the upper surface woolly to later hairless and sparsely to densely woolly on the lower surface, but the leaf surface always remains visible through the coating of hair.

Flowering usually occurs after a fire, so when flowers stalks emerge, the leaves will mostly be burnt off or scorched. From each leaf rosette rise two to eight, ribbed inflorescence stalks of usually 3–10 cm (1 1/5–4 in) long (full range 5–17 cm (2–6 3/5 in), which are tinged dark purple further up, with a thin or dense layer of white woolly hairs and scattered dark red glandular hairs. The stalks carry some dark purple line-shaped or narrowly inverted egg-shaped bracts of 1–3 cm (2/5–1 1/5 in) long and 2–4 mm (0.04–0.08 in) wide, with a pointy tip, and a hairless surface or with some woolly and glandular hairs, but densely woolly in the axils. Each stalk carries mostly a single, rarely up to three flower heads. Each flower head consist of ray florets and disc florets which are encircled by mostly about twenty four (but up to thirty) involucral bracts in three or four overlapping whorls. The involucre is broadly bell-shaped, 12–15 mm (0.47–0.59 in) long and usually 17–22 mm (0.67–0.87 in), exceptionally up to 30 mm (1.2 in) in diameter. The outer bracts are narrowly oval in shape, mostly 6–7 mm (0.24–0.28 in) (but up to 11 mm) long and 1 3/4–2 1/4 mm (full range 1 1/2–3 mm) wide, with pointy tips and a purplish, woolly fringed margin and the surface with few woolly and glandular hairs. The inner whorl of bracts are very narrowly inverted egg-shaped to oblong, usually 11–12 mm (0.43–0.47 in), rarely up to 16 mm (0.63 in) long and 1 3/4–2 mm (0.07–0.08 in) wide with the tip tapering to a point, a papery margin, purple in upper part, long woolly fringed and the surface almost hairless.

Each flower head has about twenty female ray florets, with line-shaped, pink, bright violet or whitish straps of 9–11 1/2 sometimes up to 30 mm long, mostly with three (sometimes five or seven) veins, with three teeth at the tip, and the tube at its base with many glandular hairs. Although functionally female, five staminodes can be found surrounding the style shaft. The style is 5–7 mm (0.20–0.28 in) long, and the style branches ar its tip are purplish in colour, line–shaped to elliptic, 1–1 1/2 mm long, with a blunt tip. The ray florets surround many bisexual disc florets with a yellow corolla up to 7.2–8.0 mm (0.28–0.31 in) long, which is mostly shorter than the pappus. The tube-shaped part at the base carries glandular hairs, and the five triangular lobes are recurved at the top, often carry a few hairs and have a resin duct along their margin. In the center of each corolla are five anthers merged into a tube, through which the style grows when the floret opens, hoovering up the pollen on its shaft. The anthers are 1 1/2–2 mm long, with small triangular appendages at the top. The style is approximately 8 mm (0.31 in) long with two dark red to purplish, narrowly elliptic branches of 1–2 mm (0.039–0.079 in) long, each with a deltoid appendage of about 0.2 mm (0.0079 in) wide and 0.3 mm (0.012 in) long. Surrounding the base of the corollas of both ray and disc florets are many, whitish or straw-coloured, pappus bristles in two whorls. The outer whorl consists of a few delicate, free, feathered bristles of 2.7–3.0 mm (0.11–0.12 in) long. The inner whorl is composed of feathery bristles of 6–9 mm (0.24–0.35 in) long, merged into a ring and barbed at their foot. The dry, one-seeded indehiscent fruits called cypselae are cylinder- to spindle-shaped in both ray and disc florets, 4 1/2–5 mm long and 1–1 1/3 mm wide, bright to light brown in colour, each with four or five narrow, hardly visible ribs, and the surface adorned with silky silvery twin hairs of 0.70–0.75 mm (0.028–0.030 in) long with distinctly unequal arms, and shiny, golden yellow glands.

Flowering is erratic and occurs from six to eight weeks after a fire has destroyed the overhead vegetation. Sources differ in when this may be and indicate periods between October and June.

=== Differences with related species ===
Mairia coriacea differs from other Mairia species by its large, leathery leaves with five curved main veins, net-veined leaves with an entire margin or sometimes with a few shallow, irregular positioned teeth towards the tip.

== Distribution, habitat and ecology ==
Mairia coriacea can only be found in the wild in the southwest of the Western Cape province of South Africa, where it grows on the Cape Peninsula and from the Kogelberg along the coast to the delta of the Breede River. It grows in fynbos vegetations on rocky slopes in the mountains along the coast, or on sandy flats at the foot of limestone hills.

== Conservation ==
The continued survival of leather leaves is considered to be of least concern, because it has a stable population, is widespread and common, and no substantial threats have been identified.
