= Oritrophium llanganatense =

Conservation status
- Vulnerable (IUCN 3.1)

Scientific classification
- Kingdom: Plantae
- Clade: Tracheophytes
- Clade: Angiosperms
- Clade: Eudicots
- Clade: Asterids
- Order: Asterales
- Family: Asteraceae
- Genus: Oritrophium
- Species: O. llanganatense

Binomial name
- Oritrophium llanganatense Sklenár & H.Robinson

Species of flowering plant

Oritrophium llanganatense is a species of flowering plant in the family Asteraceae. It is found only in Ecuador. Its natural habitat is subtropical or tropical high-altitude grassland.
