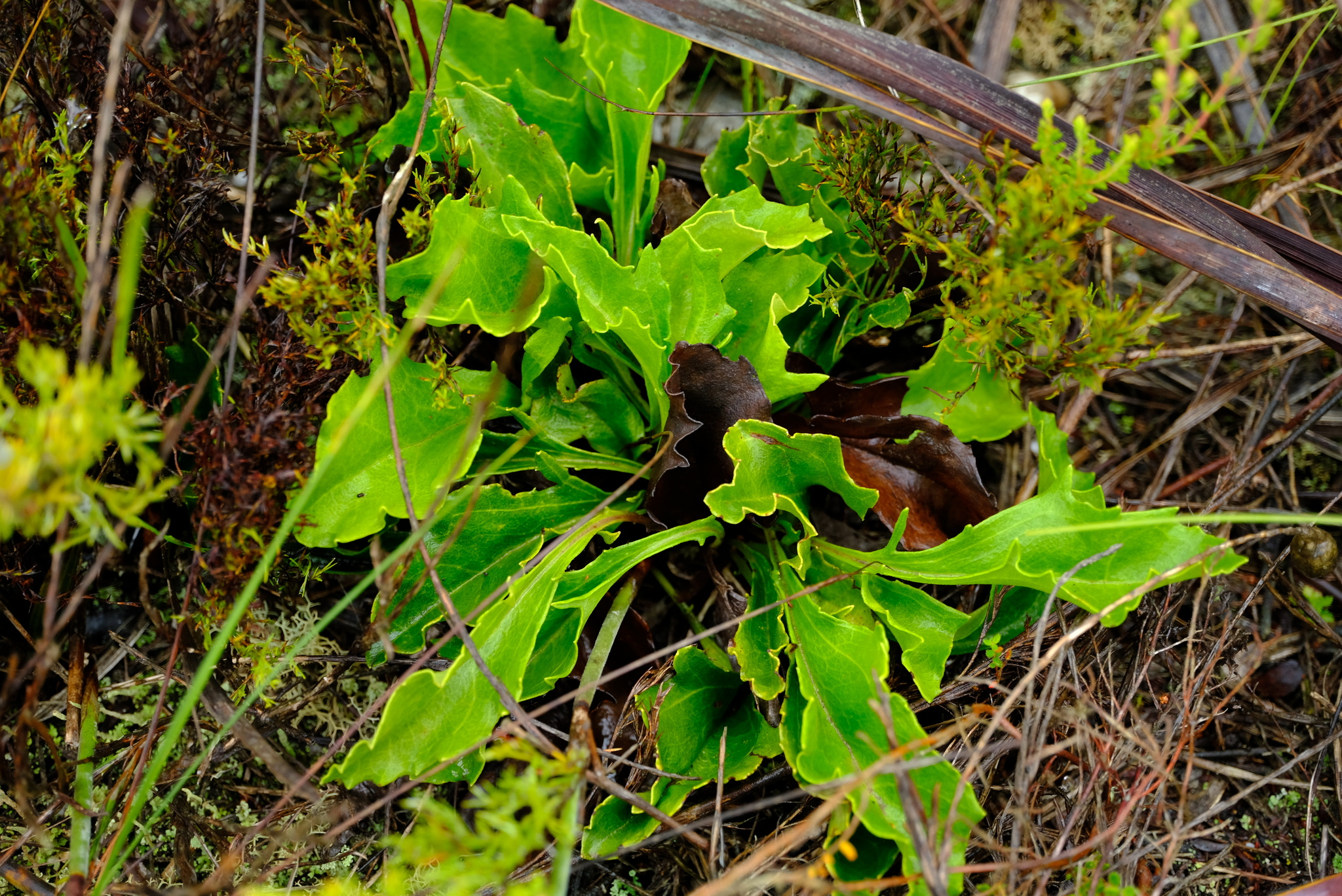

Scientific classification
- Kingdom: Plantae
- Clade: Tracheophytes
- Clade: Angiosperms
- Clade: Eudicots
- Clade: Asterids
- Order: Asterales
- Family: Asteraceae
- Genus: Mairia
- Species: M. petiolata

Binomial name
- Mairia petiolata U.Zinnecker-Wiegand

= Mairia petiolata =

Perennial plant in the daisy family from South Africa

Mairia petiolata is a tufted, variably hairy, perennial plant of up to 15 cm (6 in) assigned to the family Asteraceae. Its leaves are in a ground rosette, and have a stalk of mostly 2–5 cm (4/5–2 in) long and an inverted egg-shaped to elliptic, 6 1/2–9 cm (2.6–4.6 in) long and 2–3 cm (4/5–1 1/5 in) wide leaf blade, with a toothed margin. It mostly has two flower heads at the tip of the branches of each erect, dark reddish brown scape. The flower heads have a bell- to cup-shaped involucre that consists of 20–24, purplish, overlapping bracts in 3–4 whorls. These protect 12–16 pink, ray florets, surrounding many yellow disc florets. This species was only seen flowering once, in December. It is known from one location in the Langeberg, Western Cape province of South Africa.

== Taxonomy ==
This species of fire daisy was first recognised by Ulrike Zinnecker-Wiegand in 2011. She named it Mairia petiolata, based on a specimen collected by South African botanist Elsie Elizabeth Esterhuysen at Misty Point on Goedgeloof Peak, in the Swellendam District, Western Cape province of South Africa in 1979.

== Description ==
Mairia petiolata is a perennial herbaceous plant of up to 15 cm (6 in) high. It has dark brown to black, thick and succulent roots of up to 8 cm (3 1/5 in) long and about 2 mm (0.08 in) thick. The approximately six to ten leaves are in a ground rosette, and have a stalk of mostly 2–5 cm (4/5–2 in) long (full range 1–9 cm). They are slender, often washed dark purple-red, always densely set with white woolly hairs on the inner axils, and the remainder of the surface white woolly, eventually or even very young hairless. The leaf blade is inverted egg-shaped to elliptic, 6 1/2–9 cm (2.6–4.6 in) long and 2–3 cm (4/5–1 1/5 in) wide. The tip is mostly sharply, rarely bluntly pointy, the base tapering gradually to a point (or attenuate), the margin with coarse and irregular teeth, perhaps somewhat lobed, seldom almost entire, rolled down. On the underside a netted structure of veins is visible but on the upper surface, only a single main vein can be distinguished. The leaves are often coloured dark red, both surfaces may be hairless or set with few or many short woolly hairs, but the leaf surfaces are always visible through the indumentum.

From each rosette, usually one to three rigid, erect, dark reddish brown, ribbed, occasionally loosely woolly, sparsely glandular and slightly broadened flower stalks of 7–15 cm (2.8–5.9 in) long emerge, with one to three bracts that are increasingly smaller further up, which branch about halfway, are white woolly just below the mostly two, rarely one or three flower heads. The bracts that jointly surround the florets in the same head form a broadly bell-shaped to cup-shaped involucre of about 1 cm (2/5 in) high and 1–1 3/4 cm in diameter. There are between twenty and twenty four overlapping bracts arranged in three to four whorls, occasionally with white woolly hairs and some glands on the surface, each of which is tinged dark red-violet or purplish but green in the middle, narrowly oval to narrowly inverted egg-shaped, with papery margins set with a dense, regular row of equally long hairs. The bracts in the outermost whorl are 5 1/2–7 mm (0.22–0.28 in) long and 1.5–1.8 mm (0.059–0.071 in) wide. The bracts in the inner whorl are 7.8–10.5 mm (0.31–0.41 in) long and 1.8–2.0 mm (0.071–0.079 in) wide, eventually hairless.

Each flower head contains twelve to sixteen pink, functionally female ray florets, with a closed tube at the base of about 4 mm (0.16 in) long set with some glandular hairs, and with a line-shaped strap that radiates out from the head of 10–11 mm (0.39–0.43 in) long, bluntly ending in three lobes, narrower towards the base, and with five to seven veins. From the mouth of the ray floret tubes extends a tube consisting of five infertile staminodes, through which a forked style grows. The ray florets surround many bisexual disc florets with a yellow corolla of about 6 mm (0.24 in) long, which is only slightly longer than the pappus. The tube nearer the base is glandular hairy in its lower half, the five lobes at the top are distinctly upright, loosely glandular hairy and have resin ducts along their margins. Sticking out of the center of each disc floret corolla are five anthers of 1 1/2 mm (0.06 in) long with triangular appendages at their tips, that are merged into a tube, through which the style grows when the floret opens, hoovering up the pollen on its shaft. The styles are dark red and exert far beyond the mouth of the florets. At the tip of both style branches of 1.2–1.4 mm (0.047–0.055 in) long is a triangular appendage of about 0.3 mm (0.012 in) long and 0.2 mm (0.0079 in) wide. Surrounding the base of the corolla of both ray- and disc florets are two whorls of pappus. The outer whorl consists of few white, free, delicate, barbed bristles of 0.55–1.55 mm (0.022–0.061 in) long. The inner whorl consists of more white feathery bristles of up to 5.3 mm (0.21 in) long, barbed near the base. The eventually bright brown, dry, one-seeded, indehiscent fruits called cypselae are inverted egg-shaped, about 5.5–6.0 mm (0.22–0.24 in) long and 1.5 mm (0.059 in) wide, with four or five ribs along their lengths, with shiny glands and many, 0.5 mm (0.020 in) long twin hairs on a further smooth seed skin.

=== Differences with other Mairia species ===
Mairia petiolata has leaves with particularly coarse and irregular teeth along the margin, a distinct pattern of netted veins on the underside, and slender leaf stalks. It also has relatively graceful and elegant flower heads at the top of long, slender, mostly branched stalks. The involucral bracts have dark red margins, the disc florets are longer than the pappus and the dark red styles extend far beyond the mouth of the florets.

== Distribution and conservation ==
Mairia petiolata is known from only one location in the Langeberg, just to the north of Swellendam. Here it grows among a fynbos vegetation on sandstone slopes above 1,000 m (3,300 ft). It is considered critically rare because this one population is stable and does not seem to be under thread.
