= Chiliophyllum =

Scientific classification
- Kingdom: Plantae
- Clade: Tracheophytes
- Clade: Angiosperms
- Clade: Eudicots
- Clade: Asterids
- Order: Asterales
- Family: Asteraceae
- Subfamily: Asteroideae
- Tribe: Astereae
- Subtribe: Chiliotrichinae
- Genus: Chiliophyllum; Phil.
- Species: C. densifolium

Binomial name
- Chiliophyllum densifolium Phil.

Synonyms
- Phyllochilium

Genus of flowering plants

Chiliophyllum is a monotypic genus of flowering plants in the aster family, Asteraceae, containing the single species Chiliophyllum densifolium. It is endemic to Argentina, where it is known only from Mendoza Province. Its local common names include romero del piche and romero pichi.

This species is a member of the Chiliotrichum Group in the tribe Astereae of the aster family. This group includes many related "shrubby daisies" native to South America. Chiliophyllum densifolium is the type species of its genus, described from Mendoza Province in 1862. Two more species were added to the genus, but in 2009 C. fuegianum was transferred to Chiliotrichum and C. andinum was moved to a genus of its own, Cabreraea, leaving C. densifolium the sole member of Chiliophyllum.

This plant is a spreading, somewhat rounded shrub growing up to 1.7 meters tall. Its herbage is gland-dotted and sometimes has woolly hairs. The branches are covered densely in leaves; the genus name Chiliophyllum is from the Greek chilios ("thousand") and phyllon ("leaf"), a reference to the abundant leaves, and the species name densifolium also refers to the dense foliage. The leathery, glandular leaf blades are 5 to 6 millimeters long and teardrop-shaped. Flower heads occur singly at the tips of the branches. They are cylindrical with layers of glandular phyllaries that have membranous edges. The heads contain 4 to 8 yellow ray florets tipped with three lobes and up to 12 tubular yellow disc florets tipped with five curled lobes. The fruit is a ribbed achene up to a centimeter long including its pappus of many narrow scales.

This species only occurs in the Andes of central Argentina, where it grows in rocky mountainous habitat at elevations between 2000 and 2600 meters. Associated flora includes Nassauvia axillaris, Berberis buxifolia, and species of Ephedra and Adesmia.

The plant is used medicinally as a diuretic mixed with yerba mate in mate.
