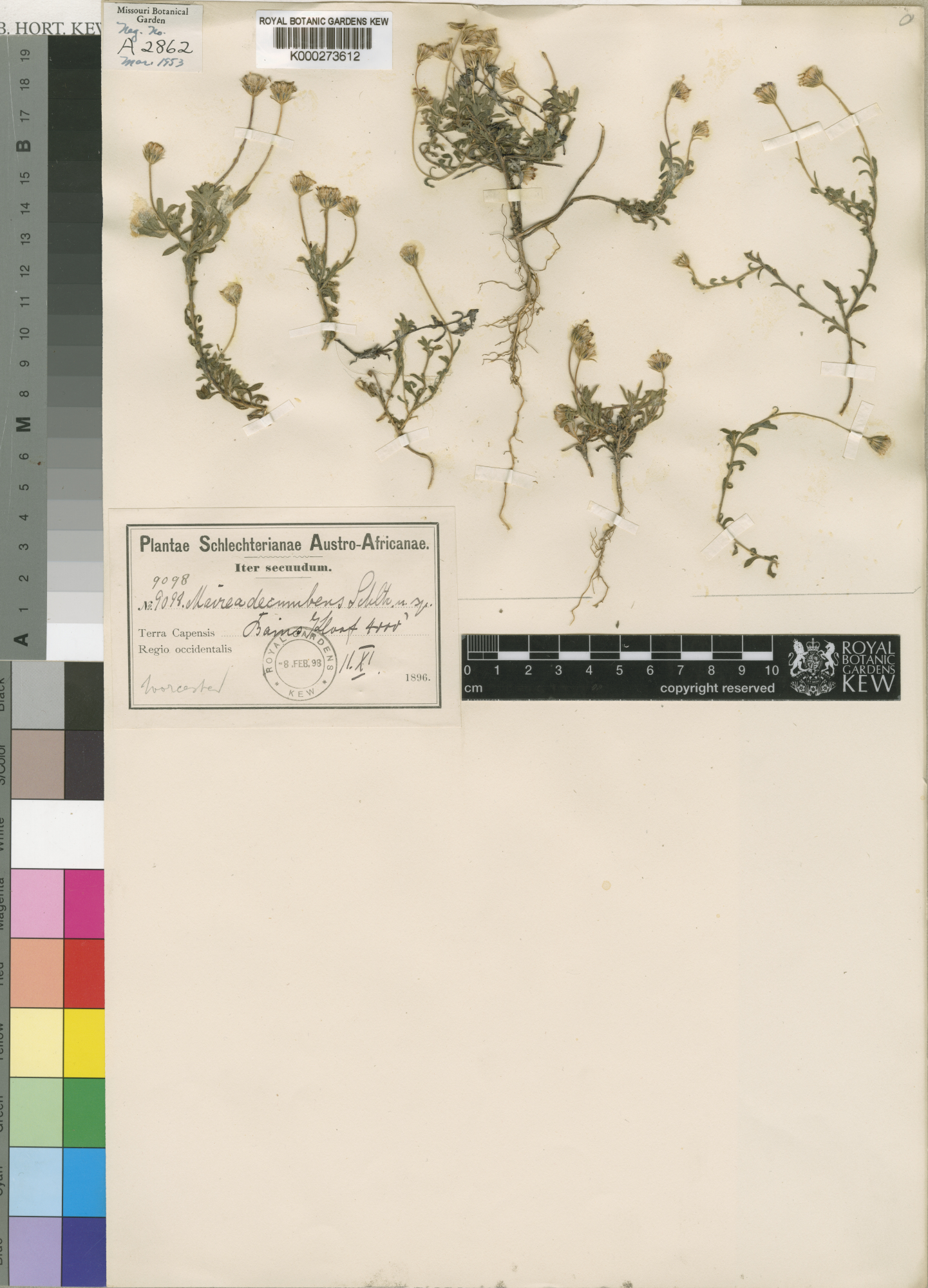

Scientific classification
- Kingdom: Plantae
- Clade: Tracheophytes
- Clade: Angiosperms
- Clade: Eudicots
- Clade: Asterids
- Order: Asterales
- Family: Asteraceae
- Genus: Zyrphelis
- Species: Z. decumbens

Binomial name
- Zyrphelis decumbens (Schltr.) G.L.Nesom

Synonyms
- Aster decumbens (Schltr.) G.L.Nesom 1994; Mairia decumbens Schltr.; Zyrphelis decumbens (Schltr.) Zinnecker

= Zyrphelis decumbens =

Species of plant

Zyrphelis decumbens is a species of perennial plant from the Bainskloof Mountains in the Cape Provinces of South Africa.

== Description ==
This sprawling or erect plant grows up to 20 cm (7.9 in) tall. The leaves, which are thinnest at the base, are hairy. The yellow flowers are present between October and December and have white to pale purple rays.

== Distribution and habitat ==
This species is found growing on rocky sandstone slopes on the Bainskloof Mountains in South Africa.

== Conservation ==
This species is considered to be rare by the South African National Biodiversity Institute (SANBI). It has an area of occurrence of only 139 km^{2} (54 sq mi). The region in which it grows, however, is not currently threatened and the population is considered to be stable.
