= Oritrophium tergoalbum =

Conservation status
- Endangered (IUCN 3.1)

Scientific classification
- Kingdom: Plantae
- Clade: Tracheophytes
- Clade: Angiosperms
- Clade: Eudicots
- Clade: Asterids
- Order: Asterales
- Family: Asteraceae
- Genus: Oritrophium
- Species: O. tergoalbum

Binomial name
- Oritrophium tergoalbum (Cuatrec.) Cuatrec.

Synonyms
- Erigeron tergoalbus Cuatrec.

Species of flowering plant

Oritrophium tergoalbum is a species of flowering plant in the family Asteraceae. It is found only in Ecuador. Its natural habitat is subtropical or tropical high-elevation grassland. It is threatened by habitat loss.
