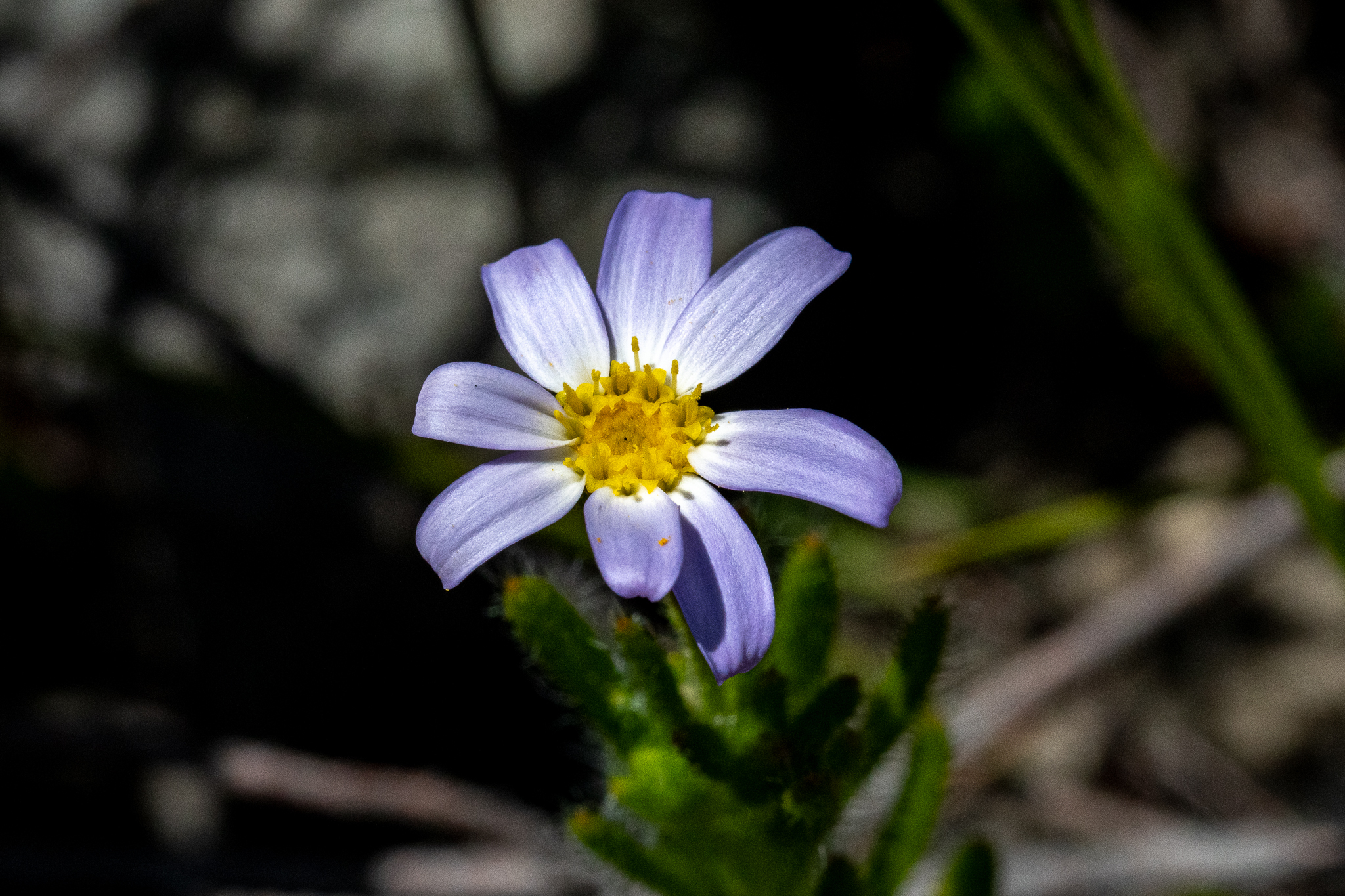

Scientific classification
- Kingdom: Plantae
- Clade: Embryophytes
- Clade: Tracheophytes
- Clade: Spermatophytes
- Clade: Angiosperms
- Clade: Eudicots
- Clade: Asterids
- Order: Asterales
- Family: Asteraceae
- Genus: Zyrphelis
- Species: Z. foliosa

Binomial name
- Zyrphelis foliosa (Harv.) Kuntze

Synonyms
- Mairia foliosa Harv.

= Zyrphelis foliosa =

Species of flowering plant

Zyrphelis foliosa is a species of flowering plant in the family Asteraceae. It is endemic to South Africa.

Two varieties are accepted:

- Zyrphelis foliosa var. foliosa (Harv.) Kuntze
- Zyrphelis foliosa var. glabra P.P.J.Herman
