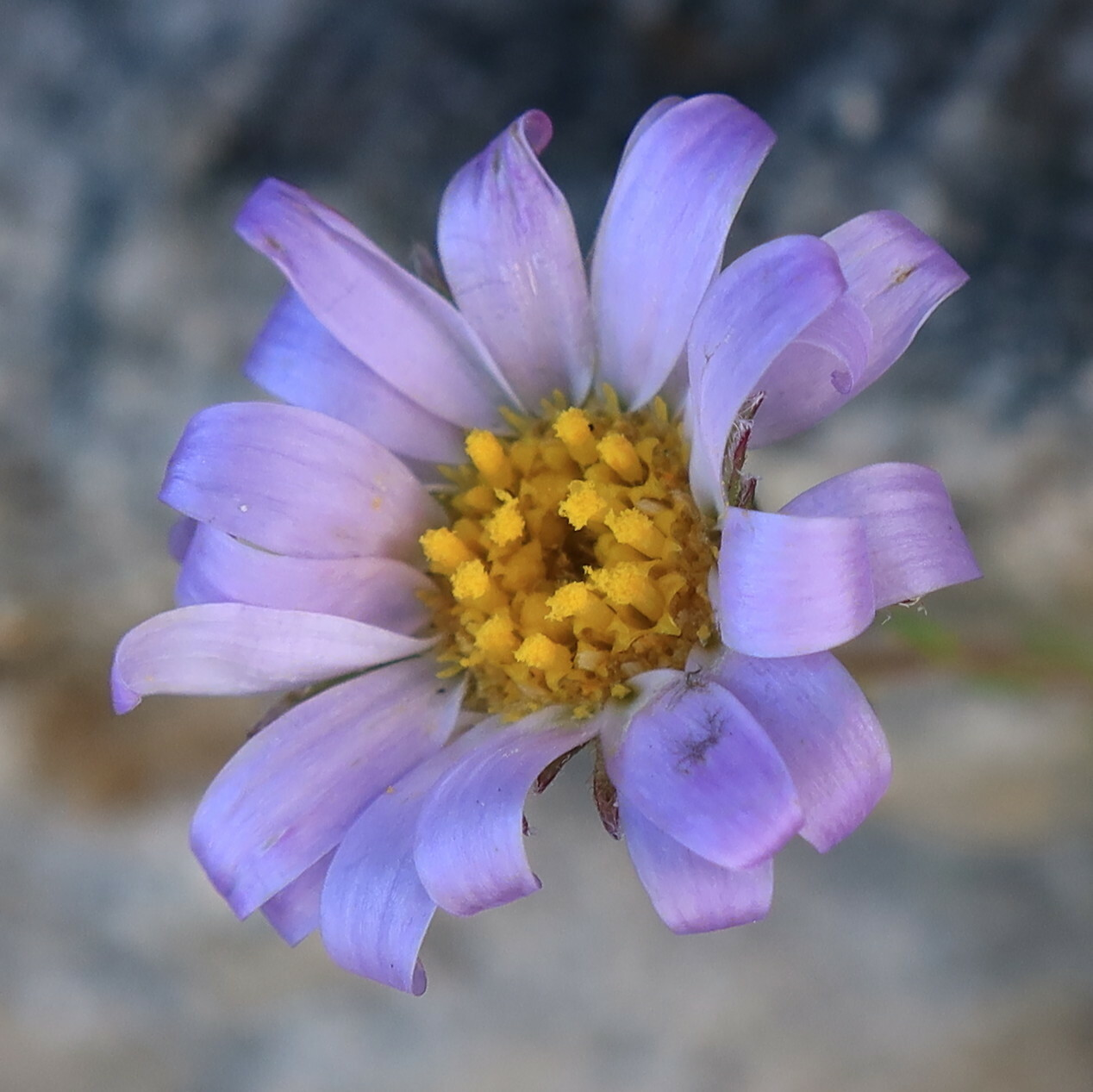
- Zyrphelis taxifolia

Scientific classification
- Kingdom: Plantae
- Clade: Tracheophytes
- Clade: Angiosperms
- Clade: Eudicots
- Clade: Asterids
- Order: Asterales
- Family: Asteraceae
- Subfamily: Asteroideae
- Tribe: Astereae
- Subtribe: Homochrominae
- Genus: Zyrphelis; Cass.

Type species
- Zyrphelis amoena (syn of Z. taxifolia) Cass.

Synonyms
- Homochroma DC.

= Zyrphelis =

Genus of flowering plants

Zyrphelis is a genus of African flowering plants in the tribe Astereae within the family Asteraceae.

Species

- Zyrphelis burchellii (DC.) Kuntze
- Zyrphelis decumbens (Schltr.) G.L.Nesom
- Zyrphelis ecklonis (DC.) Kuntze
- Zyrphelis foliosa (Harv.) Kuntze
- Zyrphelis lasiocarpa (DC.) Kuntze
- Zyrphelis microcephala (Less.) Nees
- Zyrphelis montana (Schltr.) G.L.Nesom
- Zyrphelis perezioides (Less.) G.L.Nesom
- Zyrphelis taxifolia (L.) Nees
