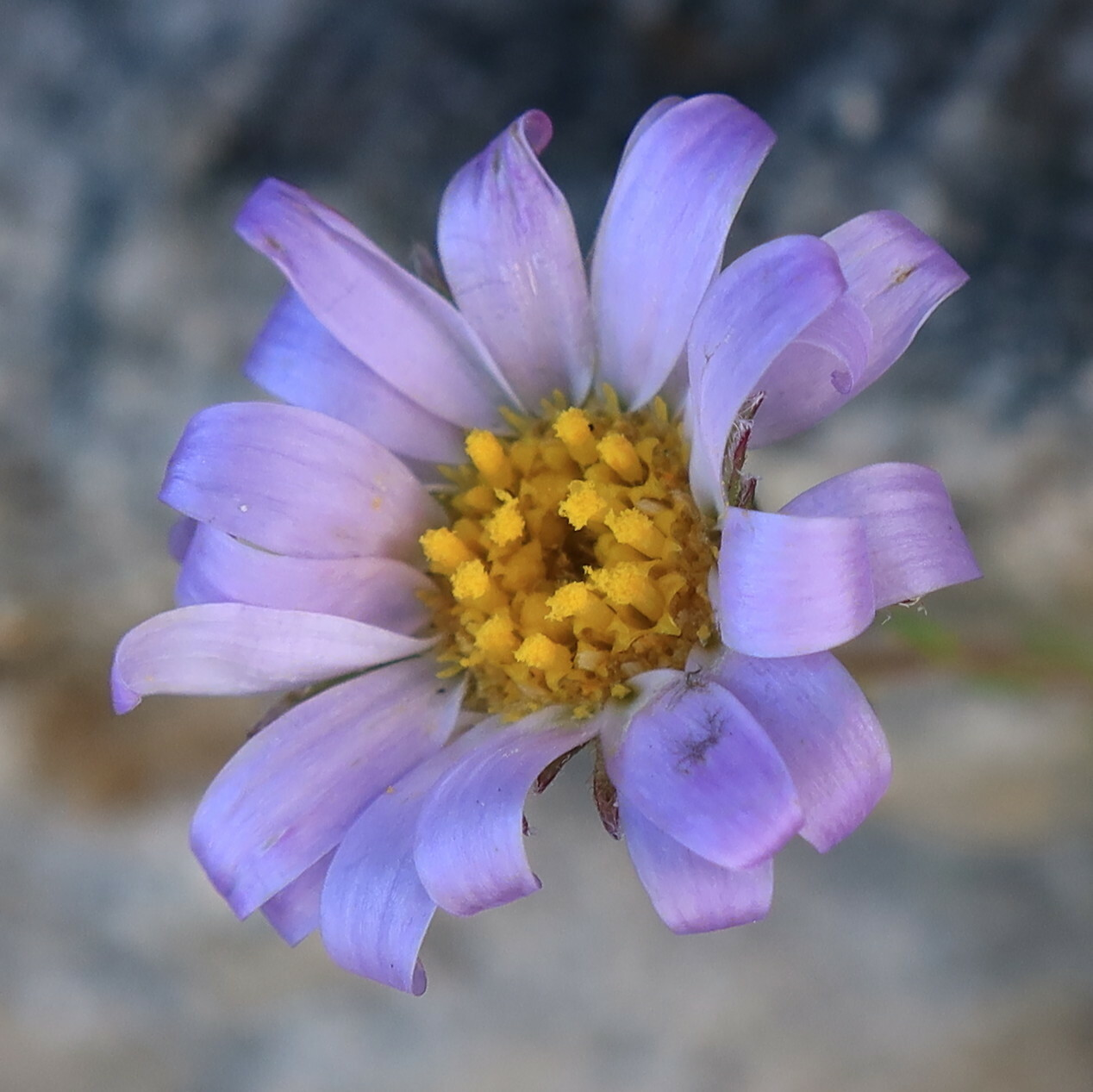

Scientific classification
- Kingdom: Plantae
- Clade: Tracheophytes
- Clade: Angiosperms
- Clade: Eudicots
- Clade: Asterids
- Order: Asterales
- Family: Asteraceae
- Genus: Zyrphelis
- Species: Z. taxifolia

Binomial name
- Zyrphelis taxifolia Nees

= Zyrphelis taxifolia =

Species of flowering plant

Zyrphelis taxifolia, also known by its common name Table Mountain plumeseed, is a species from the genus Zyrphelis.
