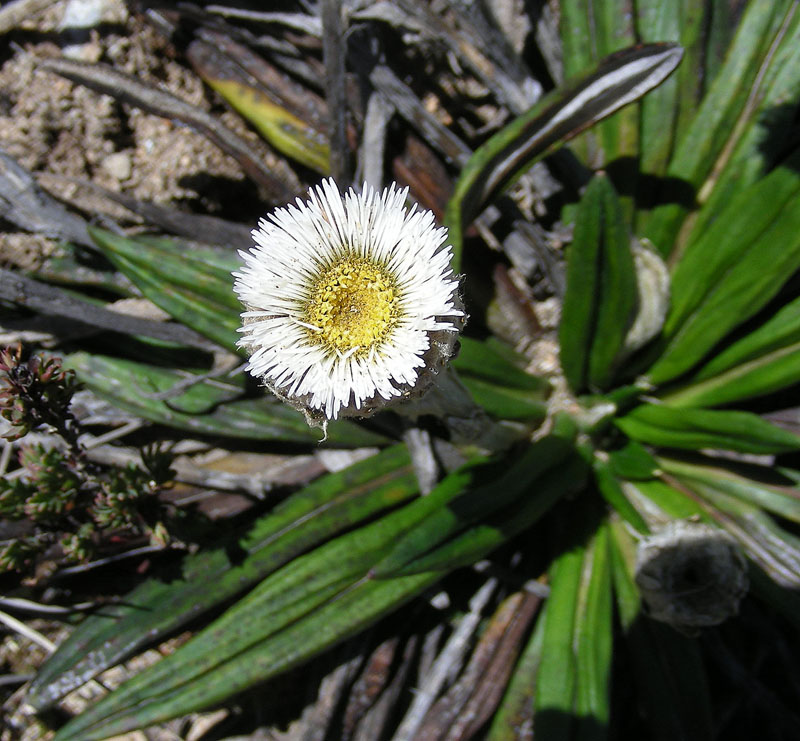
- Oritrophium peruvianum

Scientific classification
- Kingdom: Plantae
- Clade: Embryophytes
- Clade: Tracheophytes
- Clade: Angiosperms
- Clade: Eudicots
- Clade: Asterids
- Order: Asterales
- Family: Asteraceae
- Subfamily: Asteroideae
- Tribe: Astereae
- Subtribe: Oritrophiinae
- Genus: Oritrophium (Kunth) Cuatrec. (1961)

Synonyms
- Aster sect. Oritrophium Kunth; Celmisia sect. Oritrophium (Kunth) Solbrig; Erigeron sect. Oritrophium (Kunth) Benth. & Hook.f.

= Oritrophium =

Genus of flowering plants

Oritrophium is a genus of Mesoamerican and South American flowering plant in the tribe Astereae within the family Asteraceae.

Species

- Oritrophium blepharophyllum
- Oritrophium cocuyense
- Oritrophium crocifolium
- Oritrophium durangense
- Oritrophium figueirasii
- Oritrophium granatum
- Oritrophium hirtopilosum
- Oritrophium limnophilum
- Oritrophium llanganatense
- Oritrophium marahuacense
- Oritrophium mucidum
- Oritrophium nevadense
- Oritrophium ollgaardii
- Oritrophium orizabense
- Oritrophium paramense
- Oritrophium peruvianum
- Oritrophium repens
- Oritrophium tergoalbum
- Oritrophium venezuelense
