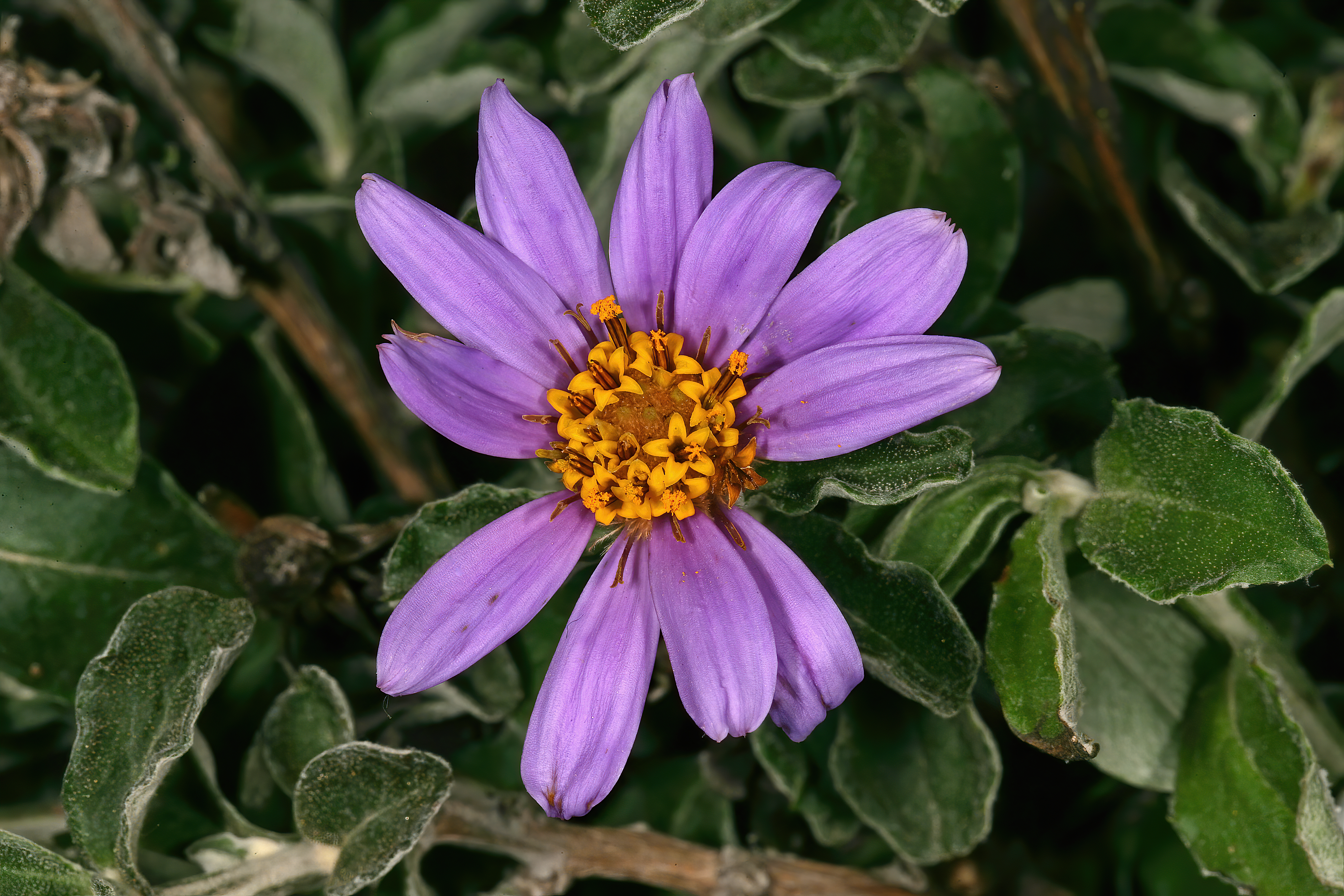
- Printzia polifolia

Scientific classification
- Kingdom: Plantae
- Clade: Tracheophytes
- Clade: Angiosperms
- Clade: Eudicots
- Clade: Asterids
- Order: Asterales
- Family: Asteraceae
- Subfamily: Asteroideae
- Tribe: Astereae
- Subtribe: Printziinae; G.L.Nesom
- Genus: Printzia; Cass.

Synonyms
- Asteropterus Vaill.

= Printzia =

Genus of flowering plant

Printzia is a genus of South African plants in the tribe Astereae within the family Asteraceae.

Species

- Printzia aromatica (L.) Less.
- Printzia auriculata Harv.
- Printzia huttoni Harv.
- Printzia nutans (Bolus) Leins
- Printzia polifolia (L.) Hutch.
- Printzia pyrifolia Less.

formerly included

see Lepidostephium

- Printzia asteroides Schltr. ex Bews - Lepidostephium asteroides (Bolus & Schltr.) Kroner
