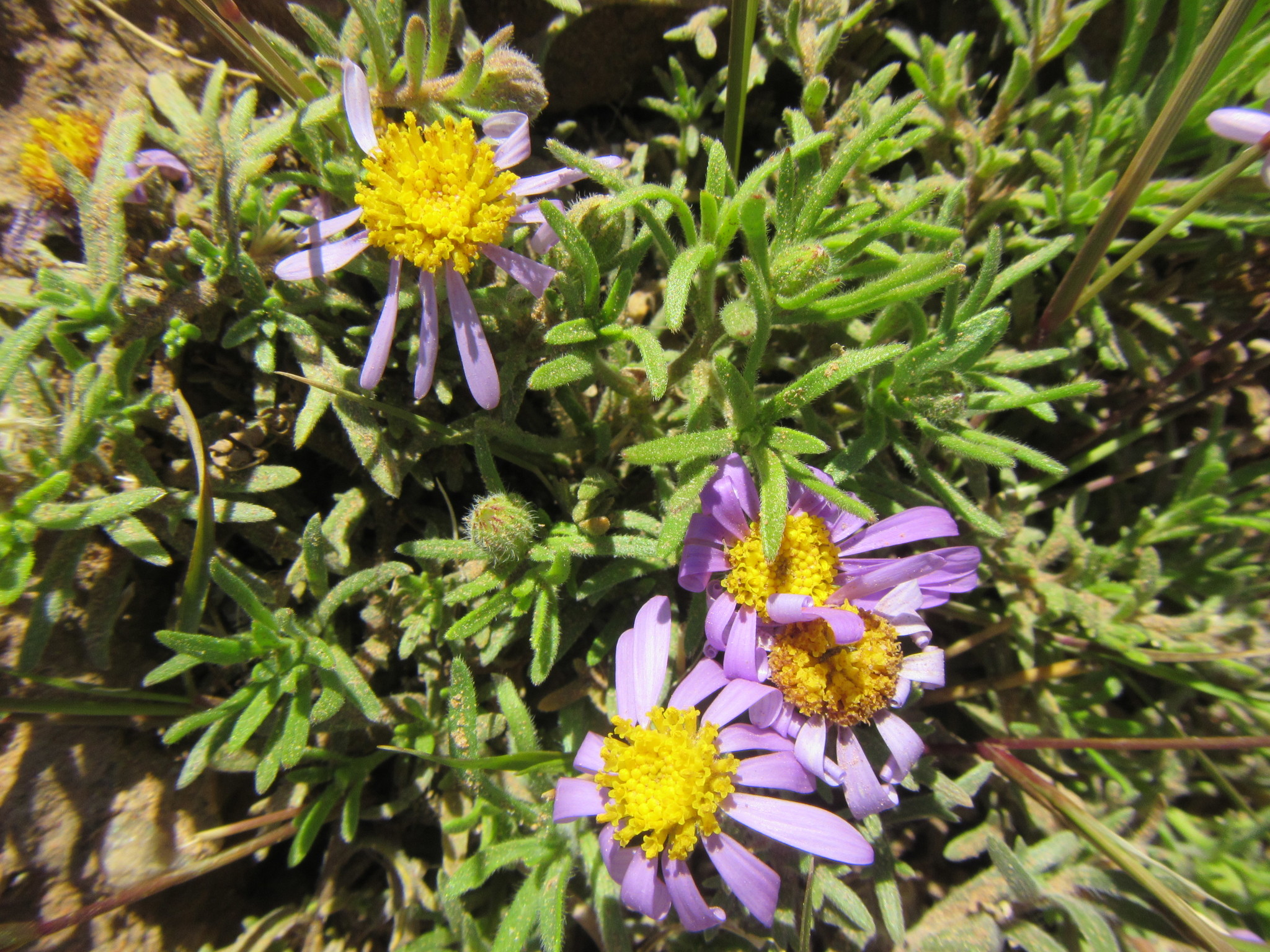
- Amellus tridactylus in South Africa

Scientific classification
- Kingdom: Plantae
- Clade: Tracheophytes
- Clade: Angiosperms
- Clade: Eudicots
- Clade: Asterids
- Order: Asterales
- Family: Asteraceae
- Subfamily: Asteroideae
- Tribe: Astereae
- Subtribe: Homochrominae
- Genus: Amellus; L. 1759, conserved name, not P.Browne 1756 nor Adans. 1763 nor Ortega ex Willd. 1803

Type species
- Amellus lychnitis (syn of A. asteroides) L.

= Amellus =

Genus of flowering plants

Amellus is a genus of flowering plants in the family Asteraceae described as a genus by Linnaeus in 1759.

Amellus is native to southern Africa (South Africa, Namibia, Botswana).

Species

- Amellus alternifolius Roth - Cape Province
- Amellus asteroides (L.) Druce - Cape Province
- Amellus capensis (Walp.) Hutch. - Cape Province
- Amellus coilopodius DC. - Cape Province
- Amellus epaleaceus O.Hoffm. - Namibia, Cape Province
- Amellus flosculosus DC. - Namibia, Cape Province
- Amellus microglossus DC. - Cape Province; naturalised in Britain
- Amellus nanus DC. - Namibia, Cape Province
- Amellus reductus Rommel - Namibia, Botswana
- Amellus strigosus (Thunb.) Less. - Cape Province
- Amellus tenuifolius Burm.f. - Cape Province
- Amellus tridactylus DC. - Cape Province, Free State
