= Cabreraea =

Scientific classification
- Kingdom: Plantae
- Clade: Tracheophytes
- Clade: Angiosperms
- Clade: Eudicots
- Clade: Asterids
- Order: Asterales
- Family: Asteraceae
- Subfamily: Asteroideae
- Tribe: Astereae
- Subtribe: Chiliotrichinae
- Genus: Cabreraea; Bonif.
- Species: C. andina

Binomial name
- Cabreraea andina (Cabrera) Bonif.

Genus of flowering plants

Cabreraea is a genus of flowering plants belonging to the family Asteraceae. It contains a single species, Cabreraea andina.

Its native range is Northwestern Argentina.
