= George, South Africa =

George
- City
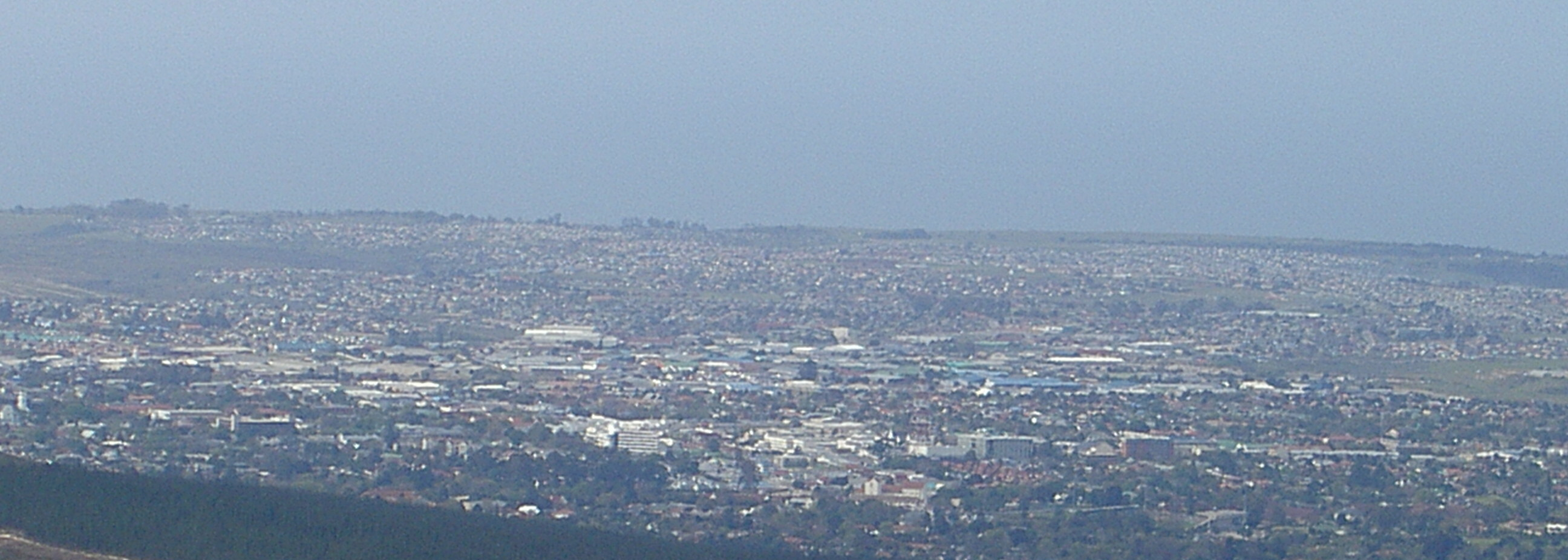
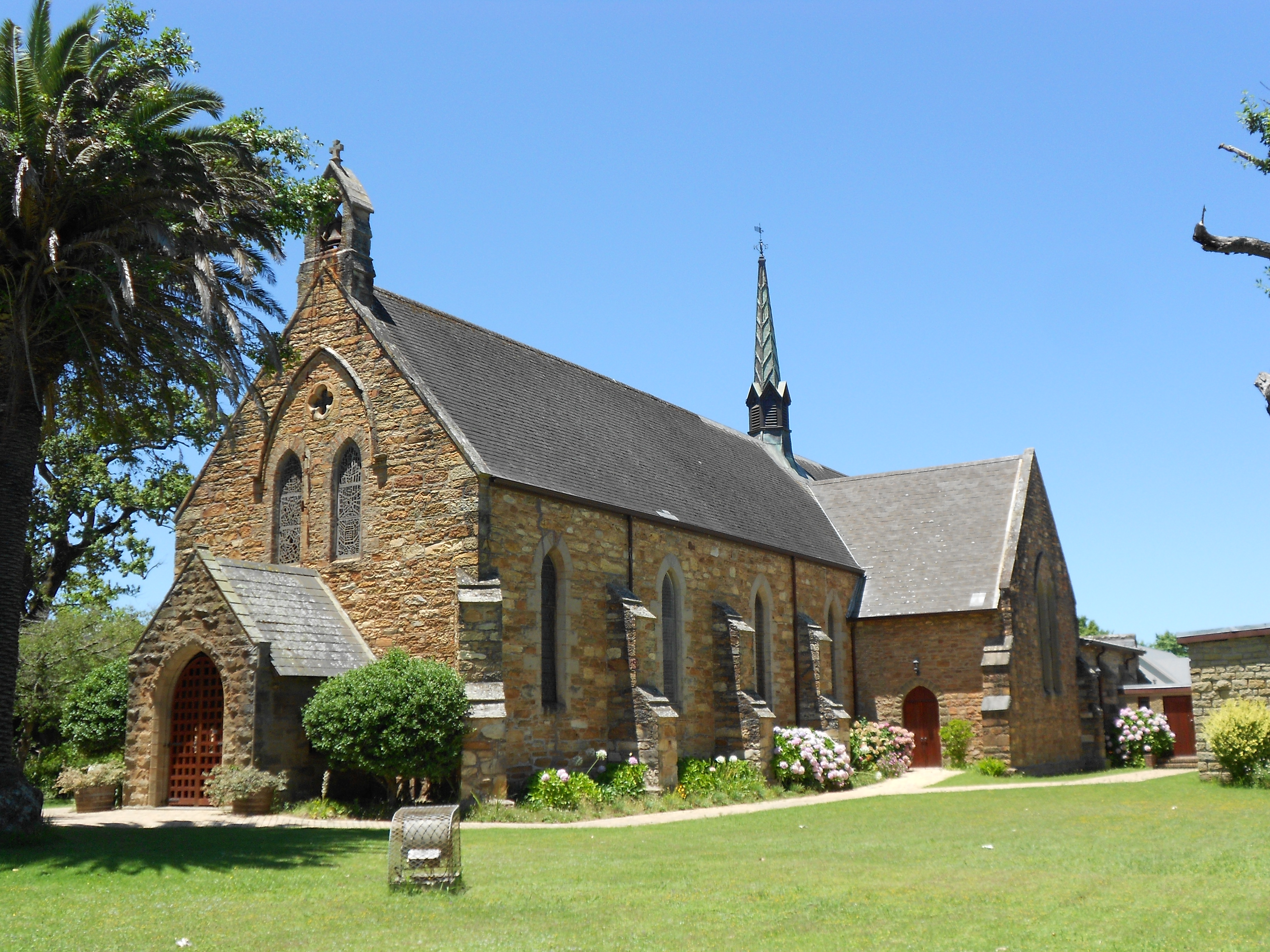
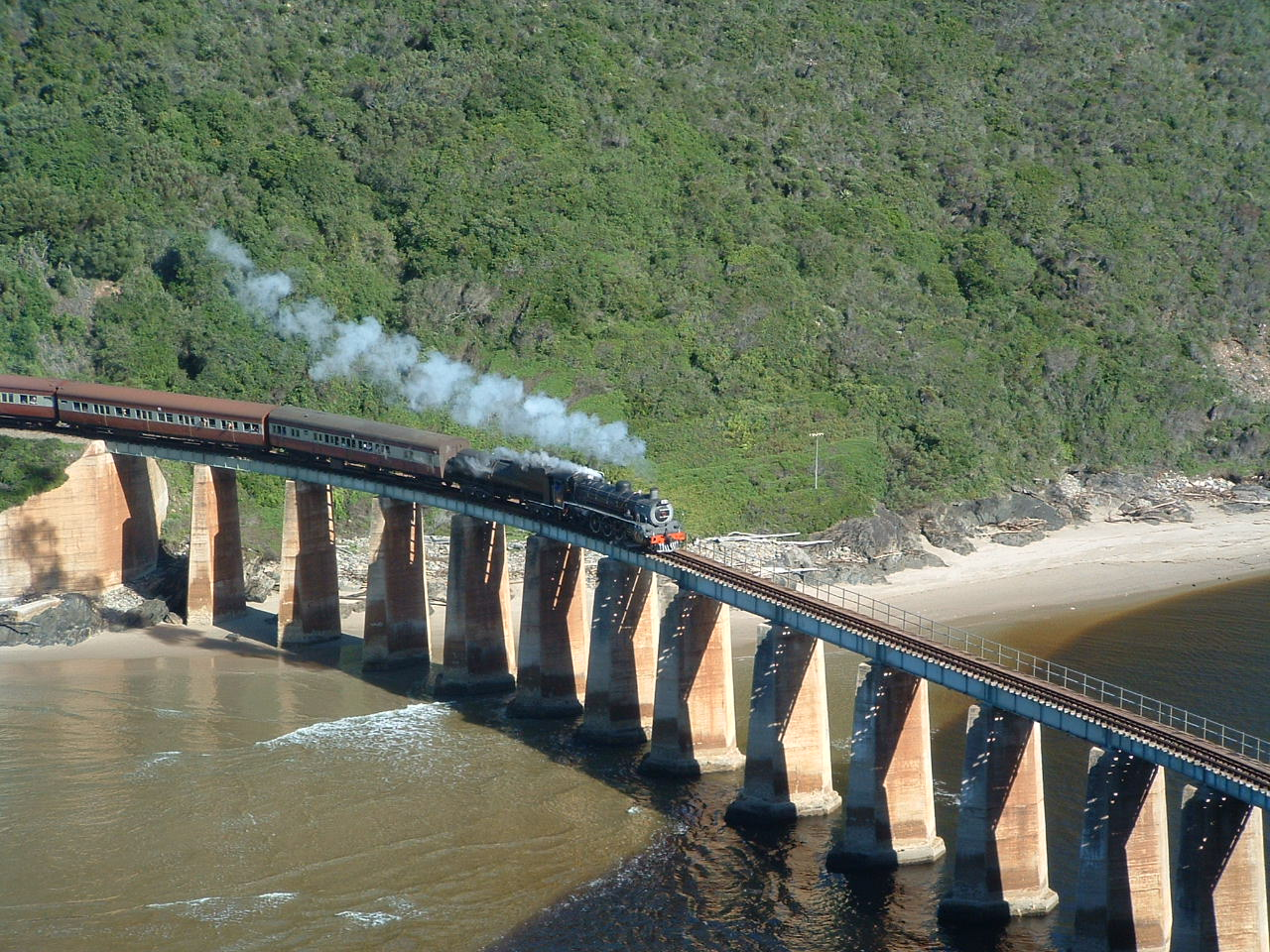
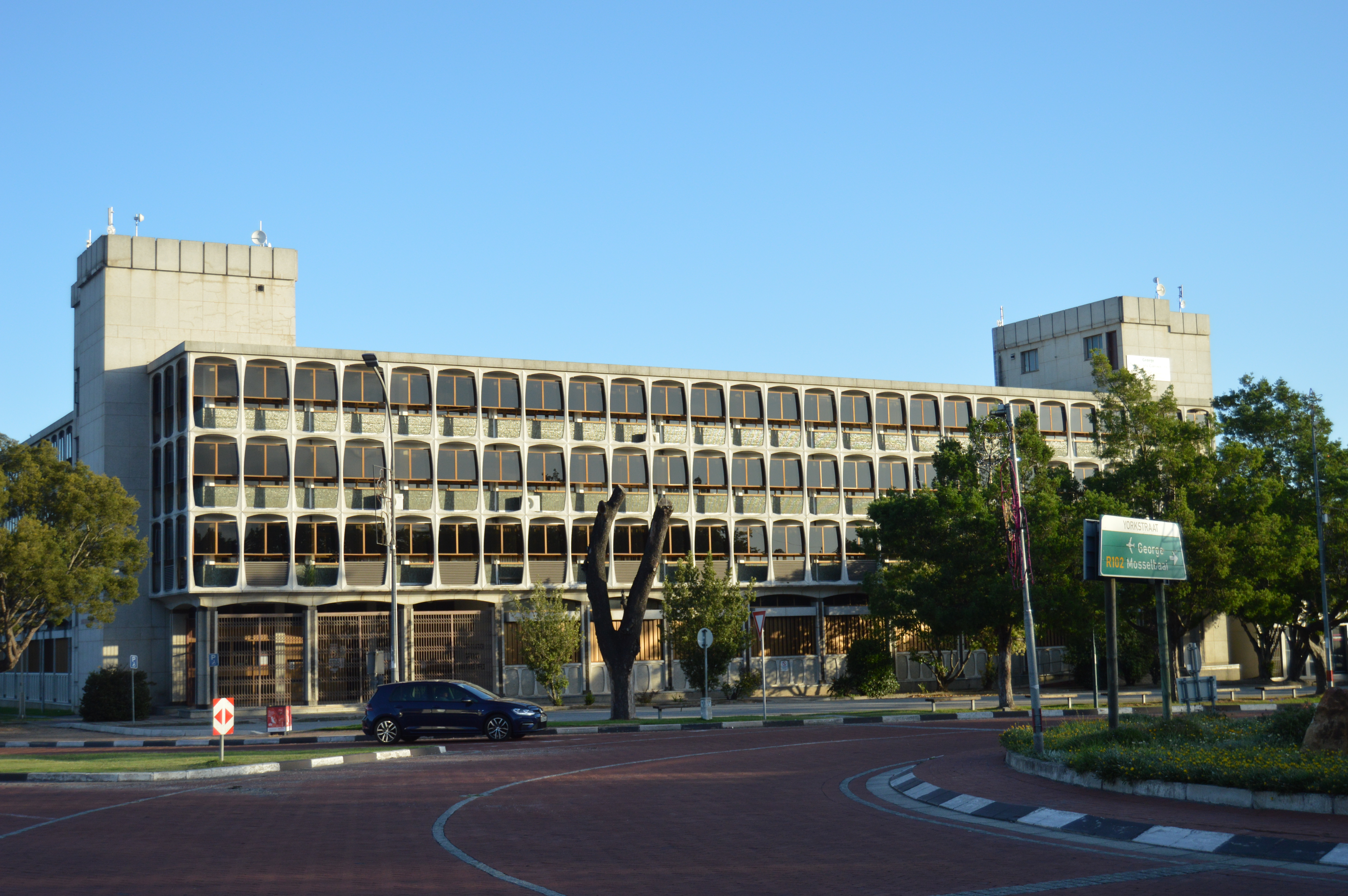
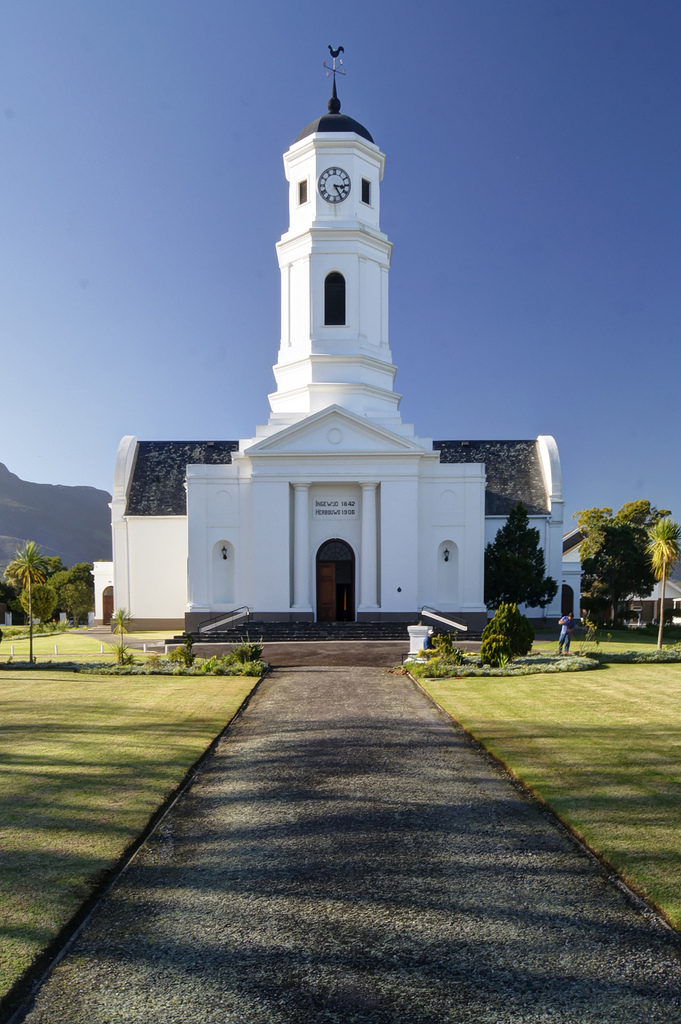
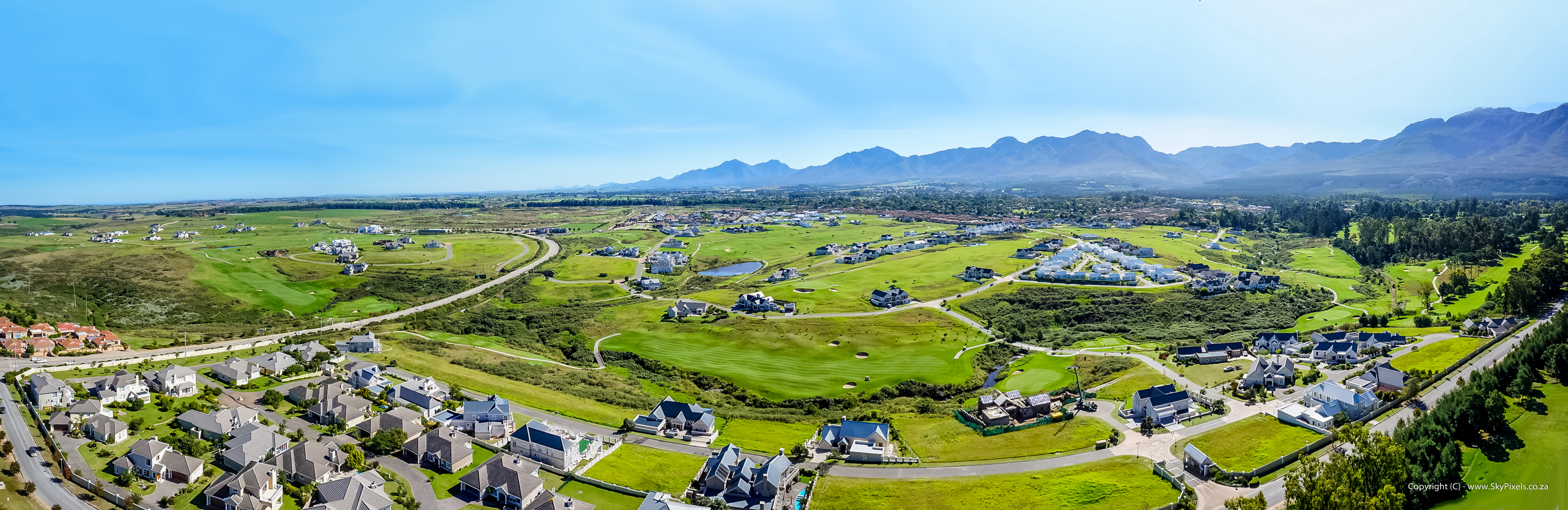
- Clockwise from the top: George seen from the Outeniqua Pass, Kaaimans River Bridge, Moederkerk, Outeniqua Mountains and the Kingswood Estate, The Magistrates Office, and St Mark's Cathedral

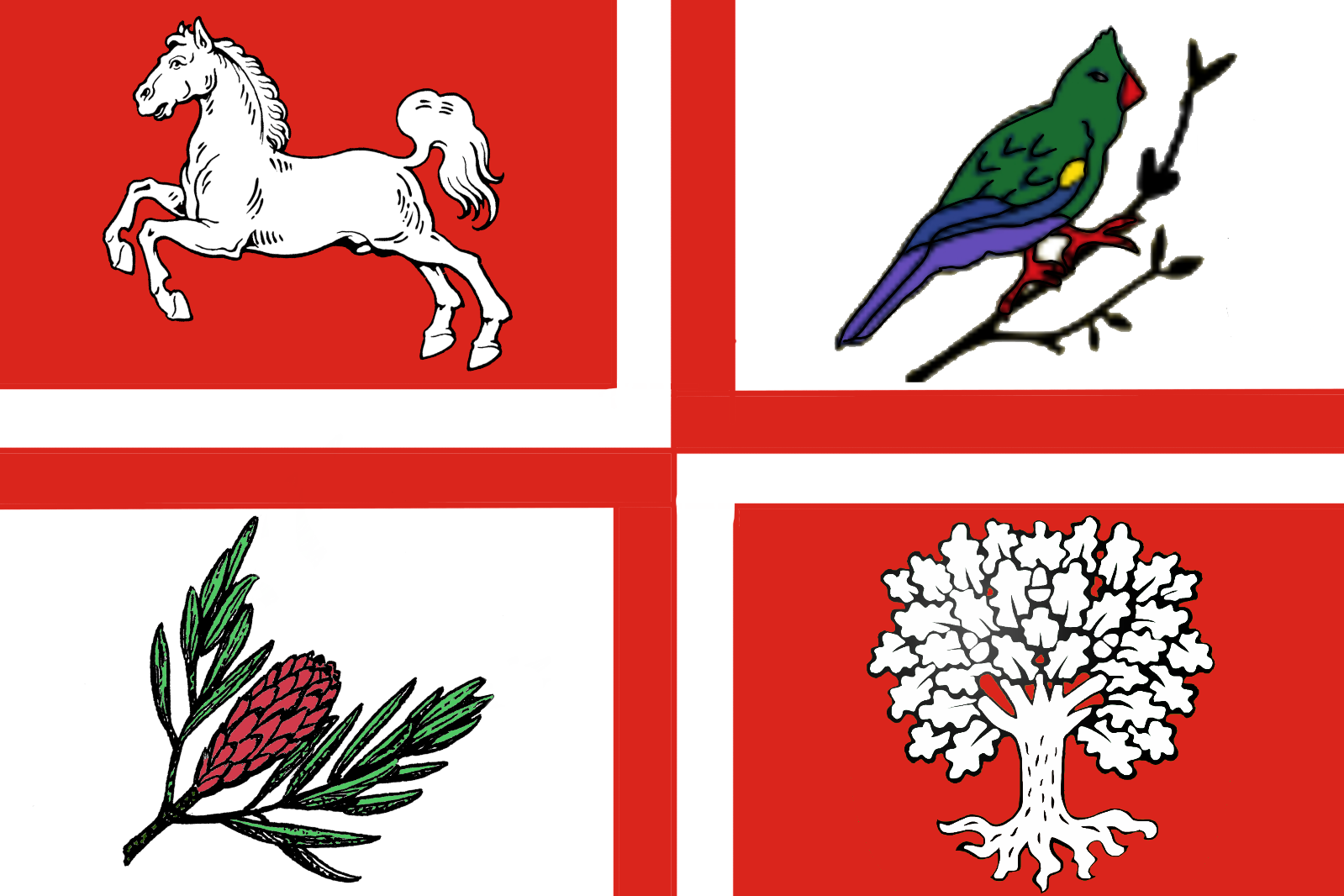
- Flag Coat of arms
- Motto: Semper Amabile (Latin: Always Lovely)
- Location within Western Cape Location within South Africa Location within Africa
- Coordinates: 33°58′S 22°27′E
- Country: South Africa
- Province: Western Cape
- District: Garden Route
- Municipality: George
- Established: 1811

Government
  - Mayor: Jackie von Brandis (DA)
  - Deputy Mayor: Browen Johnson (DA)

Area
  - Total: 77.4 km^{2} (29.9 sq mi)

Population (2020)
  - Total: 157,394
  - Density: 2,030/km^{2} (5,270/sq mi)

Racial makeup (2011)
  - Black African: 9.2%
  - Coloured: 63.2%
  - Indian/Asian: 0.6%
  - White: 25.6%
  - Other: 1.4%

First languages (2011)
  - Afrikaans: 84.2%
  - Xhosa: 3%
  - English: 9.6%
  - Other: 3.2%
- Time zone: UTC+2 (SAST)
- Postal code (street): 6529
- PO box: 6530
- Area code: 044
- Website: www.george.gov.za

George is a city in the Western Cape province of South Africa. The city is a popular holiday and conference centre, as well as the administrative and commercial hub and the seat of the Garden Route District Municipality. It is named after the British King George III.

The city is situated roughly halfway between Cape Town and Gqeberha (Port Elizabeth) on the Garden Route. It is situated on a 10-kilometre plateau between the Outeniqua Mountains to the north and the Indian Ocean to the south. The former township of Pacaltsdorp, now a fully incorporated suburb, lies to the south.

George is well known for being the burial place of former South African Prime Minister and President P. W. Botha.

== History ==
=== Early History ===
The indigenous inhabitants of the George area are a southern Khoekhoe people called the Houtunqua or Outeniqua. Their name means "The People Who Bear Honey". From the Khoekhoegowab words /hao, 'honey', tun'(teni), 'to carry (verb)', and khoe rendered as 'qua', meaning people.

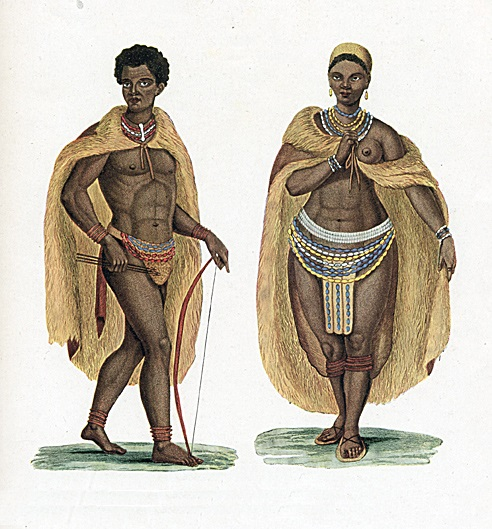
19th-century depiction of Khoekhoe people.

Little is known about Houtunqua society prior to European contact. What little historical sources exist are not elaborate. It is suspected that at the height of the Houtunqua's society, their territory stretched from the mouth of the Krom River in the east, along the Outeniqua Mountains which bear their name, up until the mouth of the Grootbrak River in the west.

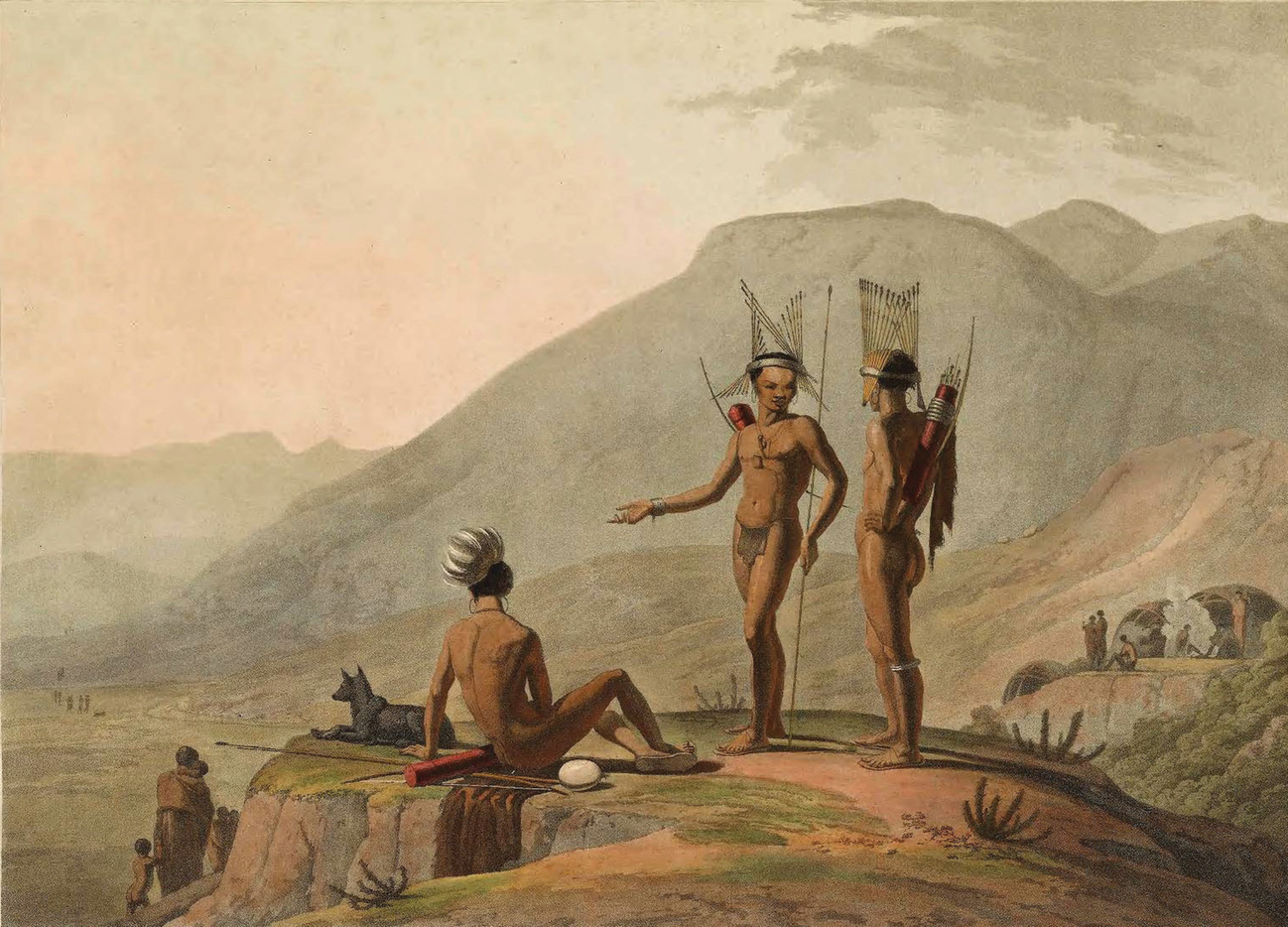
Khoekhoe hunters.

The Houtunqua seem to have remained autonomous from the Inqua (Hamcumqua) expansion in the north with smaller Khoekhoe tribes such as the Gamtobaqua coming into the fold of the Houtunqua to seek protection from the ever expanding Inqua to the north east. The Houtunqua were connected to trades routes with the Attaqua and Hessequa to the west.

Archaeological evidence suggests that the Houtunqua kept livestock and practised Nomadic Pastoralism but made extensive use of the resources in mountain forests. Excavations in the region have unearthed many caves showing signs of pre-colonial occupation.The discovery of shell middens along the coast confirm the idea that like other Khoekhoe peoples, the Houtuniqua made use of the ocean for its resources.

Oral tradition among the Houtunqua tells how the Houtunqua held specific superstitions about Europeans and believed them to be "baleful spirits". Thus the Houtunqua went out of their way to avoid contact with Europeans. Where other Khoekhoe tribes established formal relations and trade with Europeans, the Houtunqua receded deeper and deeper into the mountain forests. As a result, the Houtunqua disappeared from the historical record for some time with some Houtunqua eventually assimilating into colonial society of the time. Chief Dikkop, who died in 1816, was the last recorded Chief of the Houtunqua.

=== Establishment ===
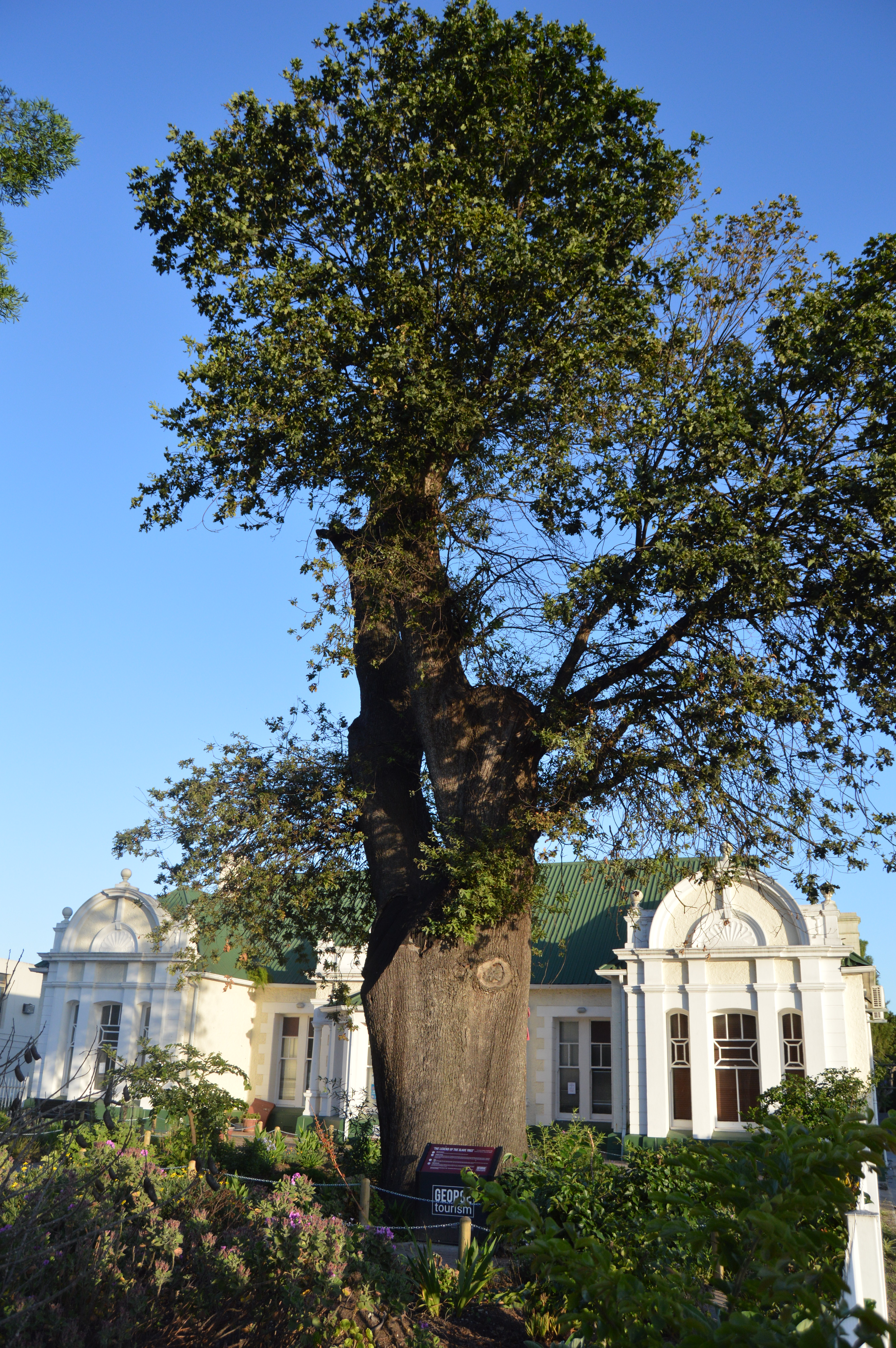
The Slave Tree on York Street. The tree was the site of slave auctions in the town prior to the abolition of slavery in the Cape Colony 19 years after it was planted.

The settlement that was to become George was established as a result of the growing demand for timber and the wood used in building, transport and furniture. In 1777 Dutch East India Company officials established an outpost for the provision of timber; its location is thought to be near the western end of York Street. The Timber Post had its own Poshouer (manager), some 12 woodcutters, a blacksmith and a wagon maker with their families, as well as 200 oxen. Following the British occupation of the Cape Colony in 1795, a caretaker of the forests in the area was appointed. After the British occupied the colony for a second time in 1806, it was decided that the Swellendam magistracy was too large and needed to be sub-divided. George was chosen because of the availability of good water.

In 1811 George was declared a separate district and Adrian van Kervel was appointed the first Landrost (magistrate) and the town was proclaimed by the Earl of Caledon, governor of the Cape Colony on St George's Day, 23 April 1811, and named after the reigning British monarch, King George III. The town's main street, York Street, was named after King George's second son Prince Frederick, Duke of York.

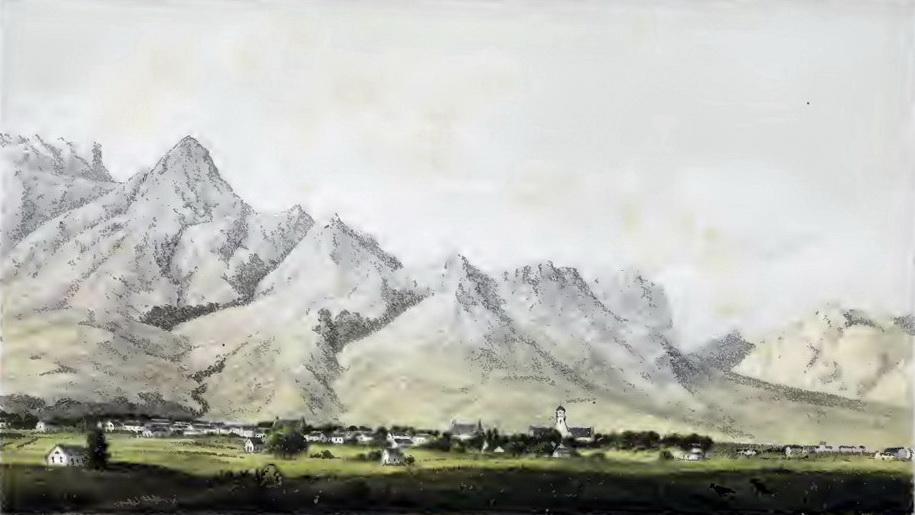
A drawing of George in 1854, done by Johan Fredrik Victorin.

One of Van Kervel's first acts as Landrost (Mayor), was to dig a furrow to supply the first thirty six plots in George with water. An 1819 map shows the original furrows and storage dam where they remain to this day in the Garden Route Botanical Garden. The first Furrow originated from the Rooirivier (Red river) and later a diversionary weir was built in the Camphersdrift River. George gained municipal status on 24 March 1837.

=== Timber industry ===
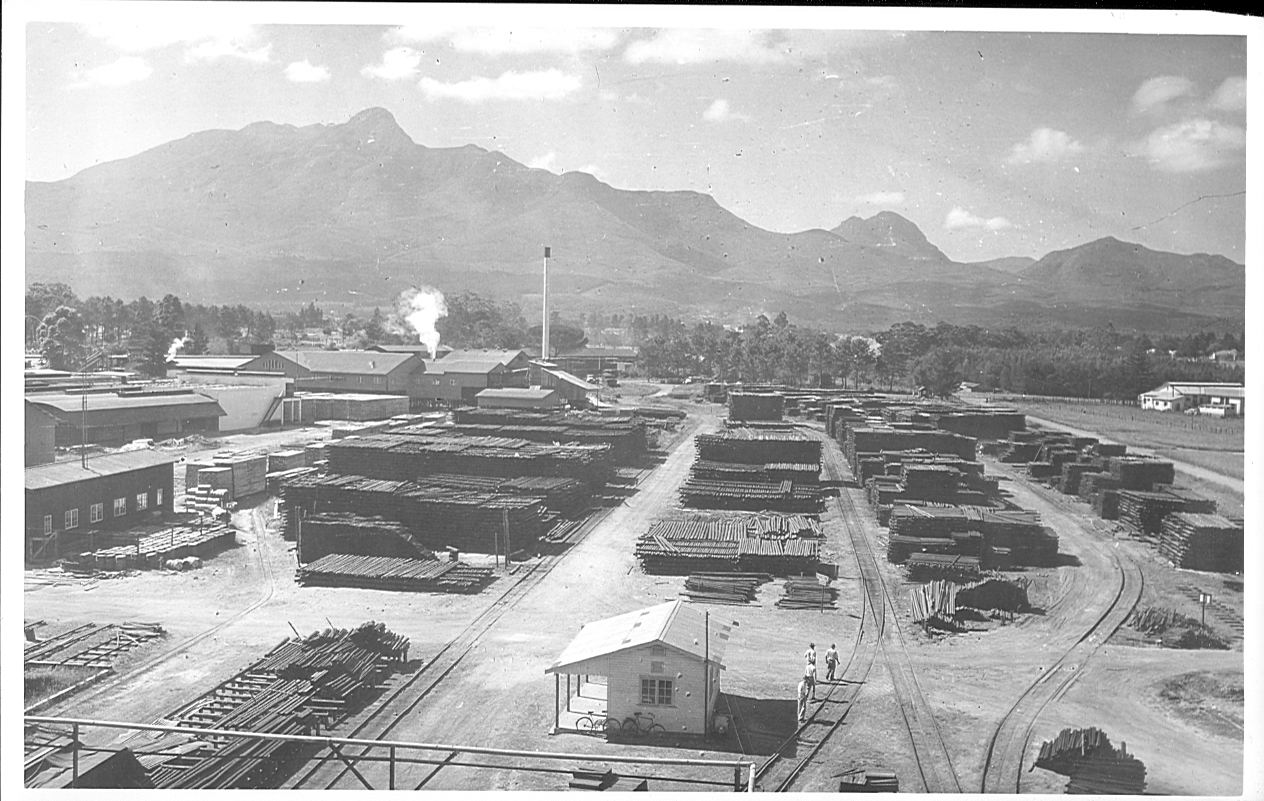
George Saw Mill in the first half of the 20th century.

From the beginning of European colonisation in South Africa in 1652, timber and the provision of various woods was of paramount importance for the survival of the settlers. Once forest areas near the present Cape Town were exhausted, the search for more timber continued along the coast.

The great forests of the Southern Cape were discovered as early as 1711, but because of their inaccessibility it was only in 1776 that the Dutch East India Company established a timber post where George is today. From 1772 there was a gradual influx of settlers intent on making a living from the forests. These were mostly descendants of the Dutch settlers. In early days the lives and livelihood of the people revolved around the timber industry and the rich forests in the vicinity and it remained a quiet outpost. It was the dramatic improvement of communications – the roads, rail and air links eclipsing the ox-wagons and coastal steamers of the 19th century – that exposed other charms and resources of the region and resulted in unprecedented growth for the town.

Early woodcutters and their families lived in forest clearings where they evolved into a closely knit community where intermarriage was common. The men were thin and wiry, but they were also tough and strong with an incredible skill in felling, sawing and handling timber.

The utilization of the forest trees led to such industries as furniture and wagon making. By 1910 several large sawmills had been established in the district. Timber for export was transported to coastal ports by ox wagon.

==== Woodcutters: 1900–1940 ====
After the ostrich feather slump and a severe drought in the Karoo during the early part of the 20th century, many "bywoners" found themselves without work. Rather than stay in an arid region they crossed the Outeniqua mountains to find a livelihood in the forests.

Forest settlements, such as Karatara and Bergplaas (1922) were started and many of the "dangerous" working-class people from the Transvaal were moved to these settlements. They were, however, a minority group, as most of the woodcutters lived outside these settlements. A small number were descendants of British immigrants who could find no other means of livelihood. There were also a small number of Italian immigrants who had been brought to the area from Turin in 1879, as part of a scheme to start a silk industry in the Knysna area, namely Gouna. It turned out to be a complete failure due to the lack of mulberry trees. Finding themselves without work some of these Italians drifted into the forests and joined the woodcutting community.

Sons were considered to be an economic asset as, at the age of around 14 or 15, after very little schooling, they could assist their fathers in the forest. The majority of these sons eventually became woodcutters themselves.

The Forest Act of 1913 required all woodcutters to be registered. In 1939 all remaining woodcutters were removed from the forests and given a government pension.

=== Historic background of the George Museum ===
What the visitor sees in the George museum today has grown from the private collections of one man, Charles Sayers. He was the owner and long-time editor of the George & Knysna Herald, a newspaper established by his parents in 1881. Sayers collected and preserved all aspects of his hometown's history, with a specialist interest in old mechanical musical instruments and typewriters which today form the nucleus of the museum's important collections.

In 1966 he opened his "Mini Museum" to the public, housed in a single room adjoining a café in Courtenay Street. The people loved it and much encouraged by local authorities he moved to the original George Town House – the administrative building next to the market square which dated back to 1847. By now the Sayers Museum had attracted the attention of officialdom and barely six months after the move it attained provincial museum status as a fully-fledged cultural history museum for the region, with indigenous timber and its allied industries as its main theme. The growing popularity led to another move, this time to the building, which had been the original drostdy (magistrate's residence and office) in the young town. The original "Mini Museum" has been re-created within the present George Museum.

=== Outeniqua Mountain ===
In 1668 the first European explorer, Hieronymous Cruse, penetrated Outeniqualand with its dense indigenous forest. The highest peak in the Outeniquas is Cradock Peak (1578 m) and the prominent George Peak is 1337 metres high.

The name Outeniqua is derived from the Khoi word meaning "man laden with honey". The slopes of the emerald-green mountains were covered with heather and swarming with bees, according to the reports left by early travellers. "Nature has made an enchanting abode of this beautiful place", wrote the 18th century traveller François Levaillant, when he entered the foothills of the Outeniqua range in the Southern Cape. A great deal of that enchantment and delicate beauty still captivates the modern traveller. For instance, there is the rare George lily (Cyrtanthus elatus), found near water in the deep ravines of the mountain, and a variety of ericas and proteas thrive on the fern-clothed slopes. Carpets of pink watsonias are a common sight during summer.

=== Montagu Pass ===
Montagu Pass

The historic Montagu Pass between George and Oudtshoorn was declared a National Monument in 1972. It is open to traffic and is a good gravel road, some 10 km in length. With many serpentine curves, this pass gradually winds its way through the fynbos-covered Cradock's Kloof until it reaches the summit.

The world traveller Anthony Trollope visited George in about 1878 and his comment on the Montagu Pass was: "...equal to some of the mountain roads through the Pyrenees". Emma Murray was so enthralled by the Montagu Pass that she wrote in a letter to a relative in 1852: "One forgets everything in the beauty and grandeur of the scene. It was to me exquisite enjoyment".

A traveller will notice that some parts of the stone wall along one side of the road are slightly protruding. The purpose of this was to prevent the axles of the wagons from scraping against the walls and thus becoming damaged.

=== The building of the Montagu Pass ===
The Civil Commissioner of George, Egbertus Bergh (1837–1843), campaigned tirelessly for a new road through the formidable Outeniqua Mountains to replace the notorious Cradock's Pass. Then came John Montagu, the new dynamic Colonial Secretary, who cleared the public debt, recognised the importance of good roads and set the wheels rolling.

Work on the pass commenced in 1844 and H.O. Farrel was appointed superintendent of the project, but the task was beyond his ability. Henry Fancourt White, a qualified surveyor, newly appointed as Road Inspector by the Central Road Board, replaced him in 1845.

On average, 250 convicts were employed at any given time on the construction of the pass. They were housed in two camps: South Station, remnants of the old brick chimneys can be seen on your right whilst going up the Outeniqua pass just before the 2nd Montagu Pass turn off, and North Station near the summit of the pass. The headquarters for the construction was sited where Blanco is situated today.

The total expenses for the construction of the Montagu Pass amounted to £35,799 of which £1,753 was spent on gunpowder. Five and a half miles of the pass had to be blasted out of solid rock.

=== Railway over the mountains ===
The building of the railway line over the Outeniqua Mountains, between George and Oudtshoorn began in December 1908 from the George side and in 1911 from the Oudtshoorn side. The track was blasted out of the rock, and seven tunnels were excavated. At one stage some 2 500 workers were employed. During April 1913 this most scenic railway line was completed. Sir David de Villiers Graaff performed the official opening on 6 August 1913. The line was built at the enormous cost of £465 000 (equivalent to £406,300,000 or R 7.75 billion in 2020 currency).

=== Toll House ===
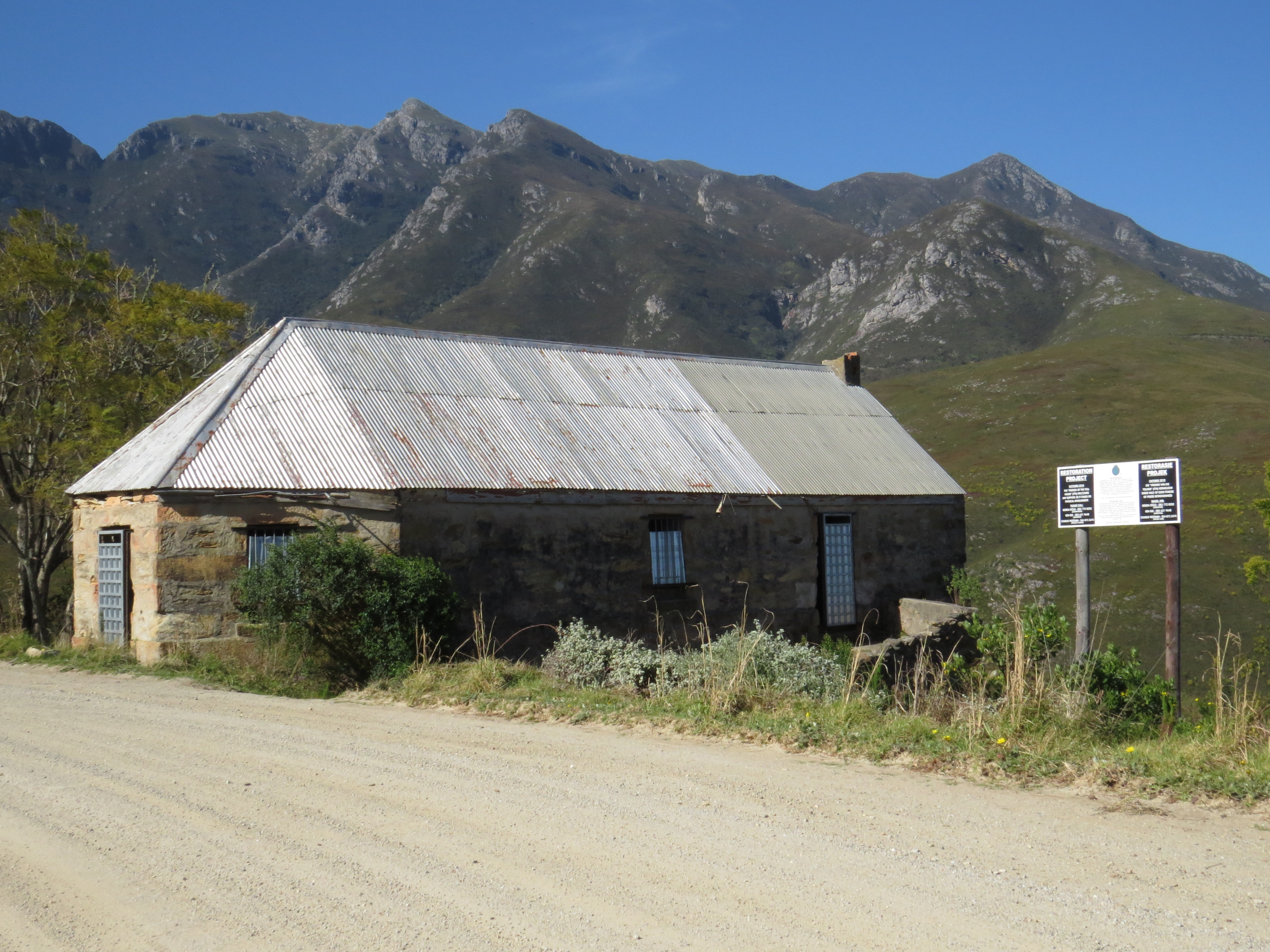
The Old Toll House of the Montagu Pass.

During the construction of the Montagu Pass, in about 1847, a stone toll house, with a thatched roof, was erected on the George side of the mountain. According to a proclamation in the Government Gazette of 24 February 1848, a toll gate was set up, and a tariff of tolls publicised. Upon payment of the prescribed fee the toll keeper would raise the bar across the road to enable the vehicle or animal to pass.

The first toll-keeper was John Kirk Smith, born in Nottingham, England in 1818. During 1849 he collected the amount of £400.13.8p in toll fees. His son William Kirk Smith was appointed toll-keeper in 1880. William and his son made "veldt schoens" (simple leather shoes) at the toll-house for sale to travellers and transport riders. Soon they had a thriving business, and J. K. Smith, grandson of the first toll-keeper, expanded this concern to Market Street in George. From this humble beginning grew the large and flourishing shoe industry J.K. Smith and Company, which was the forerunner of Modern Shoes Ltd.

Other early toll-keepers were James Scott (1852) and Charles Searle (1858). The toll-house caught fire on 23 July 1855 and the entire roof was destroyed, later being replaced with corrugated iron.

In the Government Gazette dated 16 July 1867, the toll-tariffs were: Each wheel of a vehicle – two pence; Animal drawing a vehicle – one penny; Animal not drawing a vehicle – two pence; Sheep, goat or pig – one halfpenny.

All tolls were abolished on 31 December 1918, but thanks to the fact that it was declared a National Monument in 1970, this interesting relic of the last century has been saved for posterity.

=== Blanco ===
Henry Fancourt White, enchanted by Outeniqualand, bought a portion of the farm Modder River in 1848. He sold a portion to Frances Cook, who named his farm Oaklands, and subdivided the rest into erven. The little village was called "Whitesville" in honour of Henry Fancourt White, but at his suggestion the name was changed to Blanco, the Spanish term for white.

In 1859 Henry White built a beautiful double storey thatched mansion, which he named Blanco House. In 1903 his son Ernest Montagu White renamed the house Fancourt – in honour of his father. Today Fancourt is a National Monument and a well-known hotel.

The main route from Mossel Bay to the Langkloof passed through Blanco, where a settlement of merchants was soon established. The village was also the main postal centre. This caused dissatisfaction among the businessmen of George, and so a direct link from George to the toll-house was built in about 1882. This road was called Bain's Trace and was probably built by Thomas Bain, who surveyed the new route.

=== The lake system ===
The lakes originated about 20 000 years ago during the Late Pleistocene at the end of the last era of ice ages which was largely centred in the Northern Hemisphere. Consequently, these lakes can be regarded as geologically relatively young. During that last glacial period, the sea-level dropped to about 130 m lower than at present as a result of the accumulation of ice in the Northern Hemisphere. Rivers then extended into the newly exposed coastal areas, cutting deep valleys into them. At the end of the last glacial period the sea-level rose again, drowning these newly formed valleys until, after a last slight rise and fall of sea-level, a level of about one to three metres above the present level was reached some 6 000 years ago. The sea level then slowly receded to reach the present level about 4 000 years ago. The partial draining of these valleys exposed part of the coastal area, thereby forming all the present Wilderness Lakes except for Langvlei and Rondevlei. Martin (1962) postulates the Langvlei could have been formed by wave erosion preceding the last rise in sea level while Rondevlei, during the same time, probably originated as a wind-deflating basin. Ruigtevlei, to the east of Swartvlei, was a lake that disappeared, leaving a large area that is only inundated after floods (Martin, 1960a). During this last change (drop) in sea level, the mouth of Swartvlei Estuary moved 2 km eastward to the present position at Sedgefield, Groenvlei lost its connection to the sea through the Swartvlei Estuary, and sand dunes now effectively covered any traces of a previous connection to the sea.

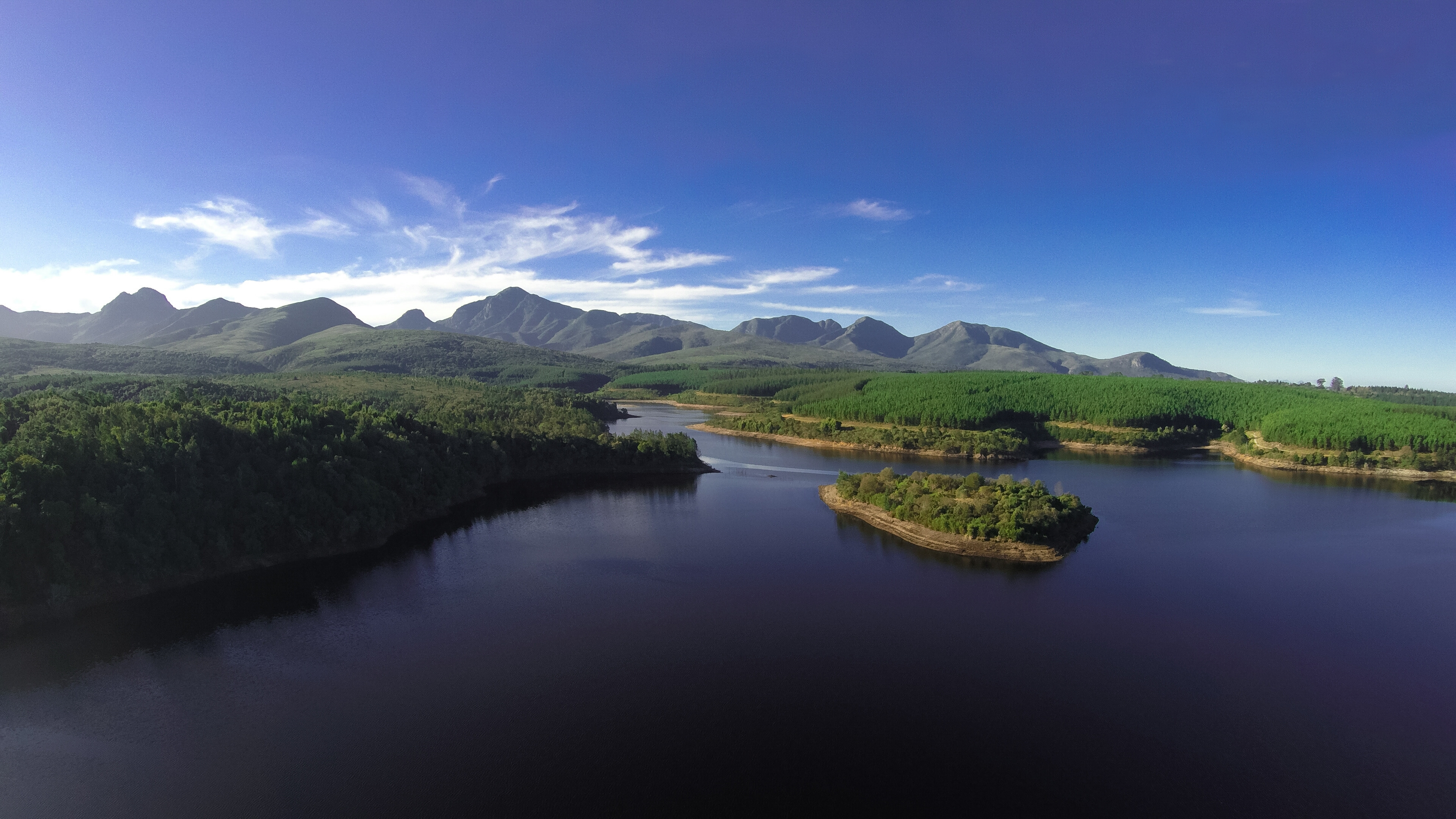
The Garden Route Dam near George.

== Climate ==
George has an oceanic climate, which is similar to that of New Zealand, with warm summers, and mild to chilly winters. It is one of the highest rainfall regions in South Africa. Most rain falls in the spring months, brought by the humid sea winds from the Indian Ocean.

Climate data for George (1991–2020)
Month	Jan	Feb	Mar	Apr	May	Jun	Jul	Aug	Sep	Oct	Nov	Dec	Year
Record high °C (°F)	41 (106)	40 (104)	41 (106)	37 (99)	33 (91)	33 (91)	31 (88)	32 (90)	37 (99)	38 (100)	39 (102)	36 (97)	41 (106)
Mean daily maximum °C (°F)	24.6 (76.3)	25.0 (77.0)	24.2 (75.6)	22.9 (73.2)	21.6 (70.9)	19.7 (67.5)	19.2 (66.6)	19.0 (66.2)	19.7 (67.5)	20.8 (69.4)	21.8 (71.2)	23.6 (74.5)	21.8 (71.2)
Daily mean °C (°F)	20.2 (68.4)	20.5 (68.9)	19.4 (66.9)	17.6 (63.7)	16.0 (60.8)	14.0 (57.2)	13.4 (56.1)	13.4 (56.1)	14.4 (57.9)	16.0 (60.8)	17.2 (63.0)	19.1 (66.4)	16.8 (62.2)
Mean daily minimum °C (°F)	15.8 (60.4)	16.1 (61.0)	14.7 (58.5)	12.3 (54.1)	10.4 (50.7)	8.3 (46.9)	7.6 (45.7)	7.9 (46.2)	9.1 (48.4)	11.2 (52.2)	12.6 (54.7)	14.7 (58.5)	11.7 (53.1)
Record low °C (°F)	7 (45)	8 (46)	6 (43)	4 (39)	0 (32)	0 (32)	1 (34)	0 (32)	2 (36)	3 (37)	5 (41)	7 (45)	0 (32)
Average precipitation mm (inches)	62.4 (2.46)	49.0 (1.93)	64.7 (2.55)	51.5 (2.03)	37.2 (1.46)	39.9 (1.57)	43.9 (1.73)	60.9 (2.40)	48.9 (1.93)	77.2 (3.04)	81.6 (3.21)	54.3 (2.14)	671.5 (26.44)
Average precipitation days (≥ 1.0 mm)	7.4	6.3	7.2	6.2	4.8	5.7	5.5	6.7	6.0	7.3	7.2	7.1	77.3
Average relative humidity (%)	79	81	83	80	74	67	70	71	76	79	78	77	77
Mean monthly sunshine hours	229.7	204.6	210.7	200.9	202.8	190.3	207.8	221.0	217.6	224.9	225.4	236.5	2,572.5
Mean daily sunshine hours	7.6	7.3	6.7	6.7	6.6	6.6	6.8	6.8	6.7	6.9	7.4	7.6	7.0
Source 1: NOAA, South African Weather Service
Source 2: Deutscher Wetterdienst (humidity 1951–1977 and daily sun 1979-2000)

George

Climate chart (precipitation, max. and min. temperature)
J	F	M	A	M	J	J	A	S	O	N	D
63 25 15	59 25 15	69 24 14	71 22 12	53 21 10	45 19 8	43 19 7	68 19 7	60 19 9	64 20 10	61 22 12	59 23 14
- █ Average max. and min. temperatures in °C
- █ Precipitation totals in mm
- Source: SAWS
Imperial conversion
J	F	M	A	M	J	J	A	S	O	N	D
2.5 77 59	2.3 77 59	2.7 75 57	2.8 72 54	2.1 70 50	1.8 66 46	1.7 66 45	2.7 66 45	2.4 66 48	2.5 68 50	2.4 72 54	2.3 73 57
- █ Average max. and min. temperatures in °F
- █ Precipitation totals in inches

== Demographics ==
The 2001 census divided the urban area of George into four "main places": George proper, population 68,557; Thembalethu, population 31,999; Pacaltsdorp, population 18,285; and Lawaaikamp, population 2,458. This gives a total population of 121,299 in the urban area. 51.2% of these people were female and 48.8% were male.

Of the total urban population, 49.5% described themselves as Coloured, 29.3% as "Black African", 20.9% as "White", and 0.3% as "Indian or Asian". 65.4% spoke Afrikaans as their home language, 26.9% spoke Xhosa, 6.9% spoke English, and 0.9% spoke some other language.

The 1936 census recorded a total population 9,075 residents with 3,437 of them being recorded as "Coloured" and 5,195 recorded as "White".

== Attractions ==
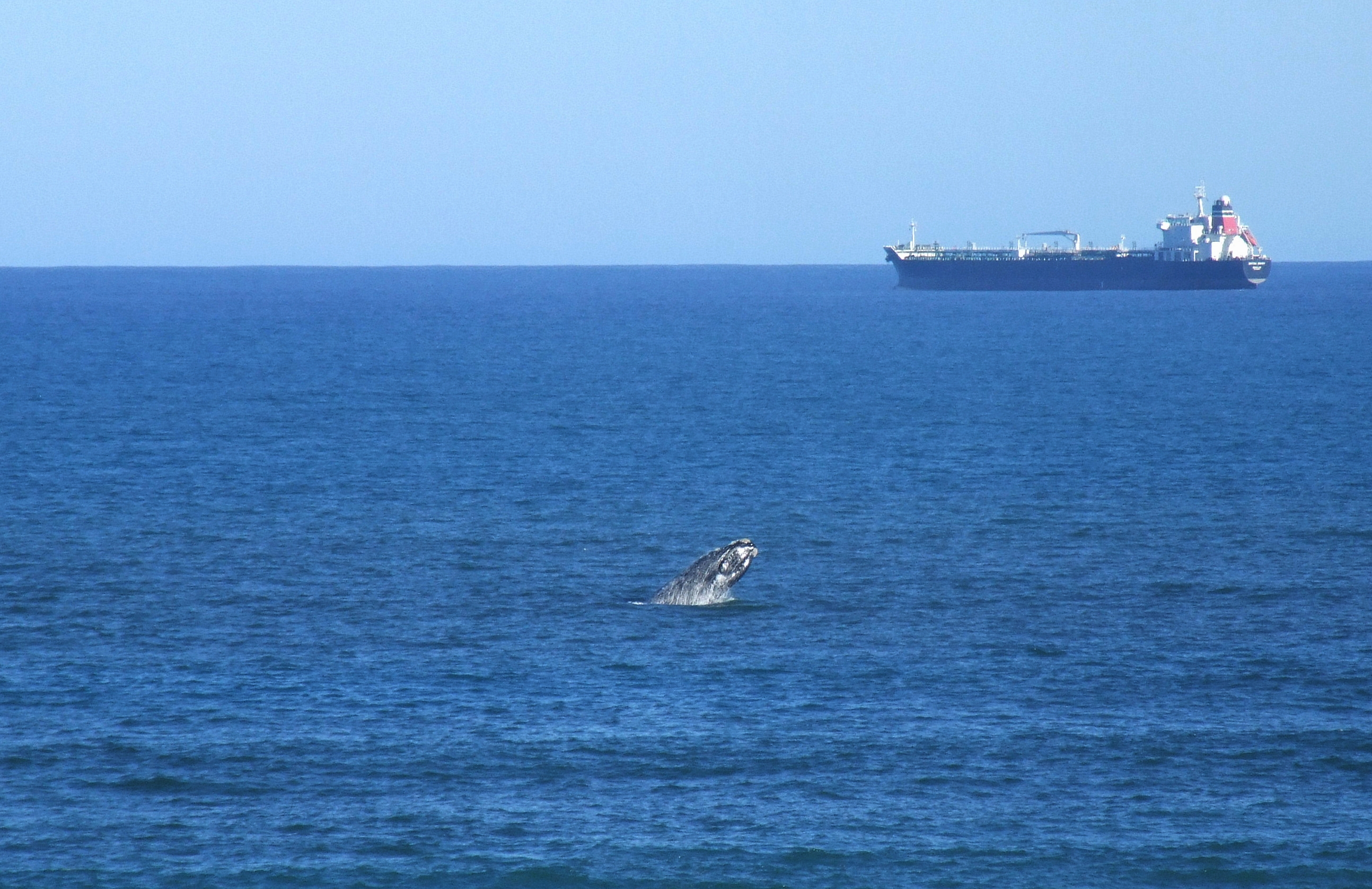
Southern right whale breaches off the coast

George has a sophisticated infrastructure with banks, conference facilities, businesses and shopping centres including the Garden Route Mall and Eden Meander, transport and sporting facilities, yet retains its small town atmosphere. The city is also a major accommodation centre.

George has numerous world-class golf courses, some designed by famous golfers. The most well-known is Fancourt Golf Estate, which hosted the Presidents Cup in 2003 and is often the host to high-profile golf tournaments.

Every December through 2010, top national rugby sevens teams from around the world came to Outeniqua Park for the South Africa Sevens, one of the tournaments in the IRB Sevens World Series. However, the tournament was moved to Port Elizabeth. December 2015 the Tournament was moved to the Green Point stadium in Cape Town.

George has many historical landmarks:

- The Slave Tree, an ancient English oak planted by Landdrost (magistrate) van Kervel, known as the Slave Tree because of the very large chain and lock embedded in the trunk, has been declared a national monument.
- The King Edward VII Library building, said to be the best example of Edwardian architecture in George.

The First Class School for girls was started by Miss Christina Petronella van Niekerk, a "New Age" young lady with visions for the future which were very different from those ideas held by the conservative population of George.

George is often used a base to explore Tsitsikamma National Park.

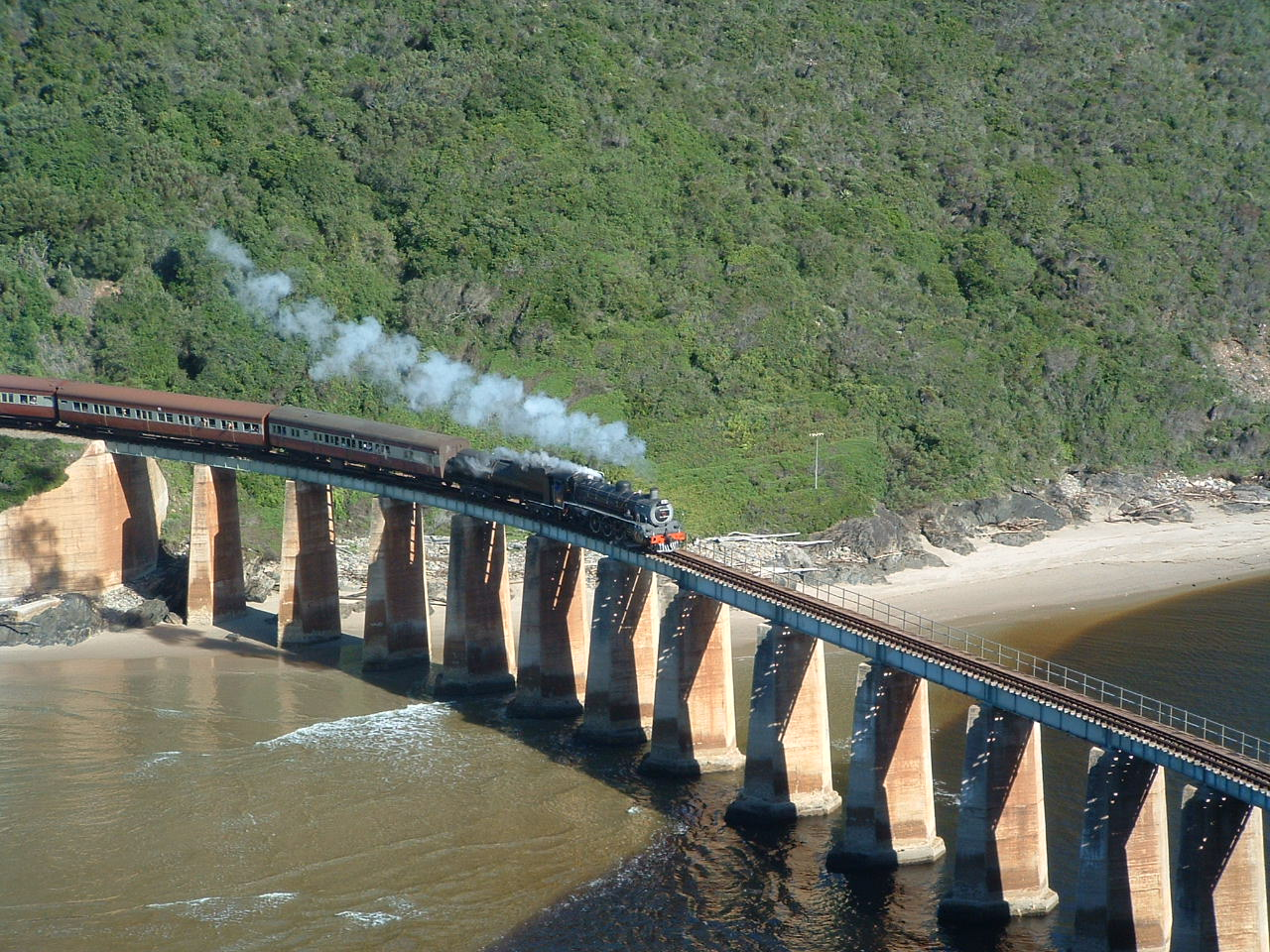
Outeniqua Choo Tjoe

The Outeniqua Choo Tjoe was South Africa's last scheduled mixed steam train service and operated on the Outeniqualand Preserved Railway between George and Knysna on the Garden Route. Opened in 1928 and declared a preserved line in July 1993, this train winds its way through picturesque scenery. However, after a landslide disrupted operations in 2007 service was maintained on the section between George, Hartenbos and Mossel Bay. In 2010 Transnet, the South African railway authority, decided to discontinue all operations of the Choo-Tjoe train.

The Outeniqua Transport Museum houses a large collection of steam locomotives and carriages.

The Garden Route Botanical Garden is situated the top of Caledon Street. The Garden Route boasts the largest continuous natural forest area in South Africa, covering some 650 km^{2}. Marketable timber is harvested from 20% of the State forest. Stinkwood, named for its unmistakable odour when freshly cut, is highly prized by the furniture industry, as are white pear, hard pear, ironwood and assegaai. The most sought after timber is the outeniqua yellowwood (Podocarpus falcatus).

== Festivals and events ==
Annually the city of George plays host to several local, national and international events.

=== George Old Car Show ===
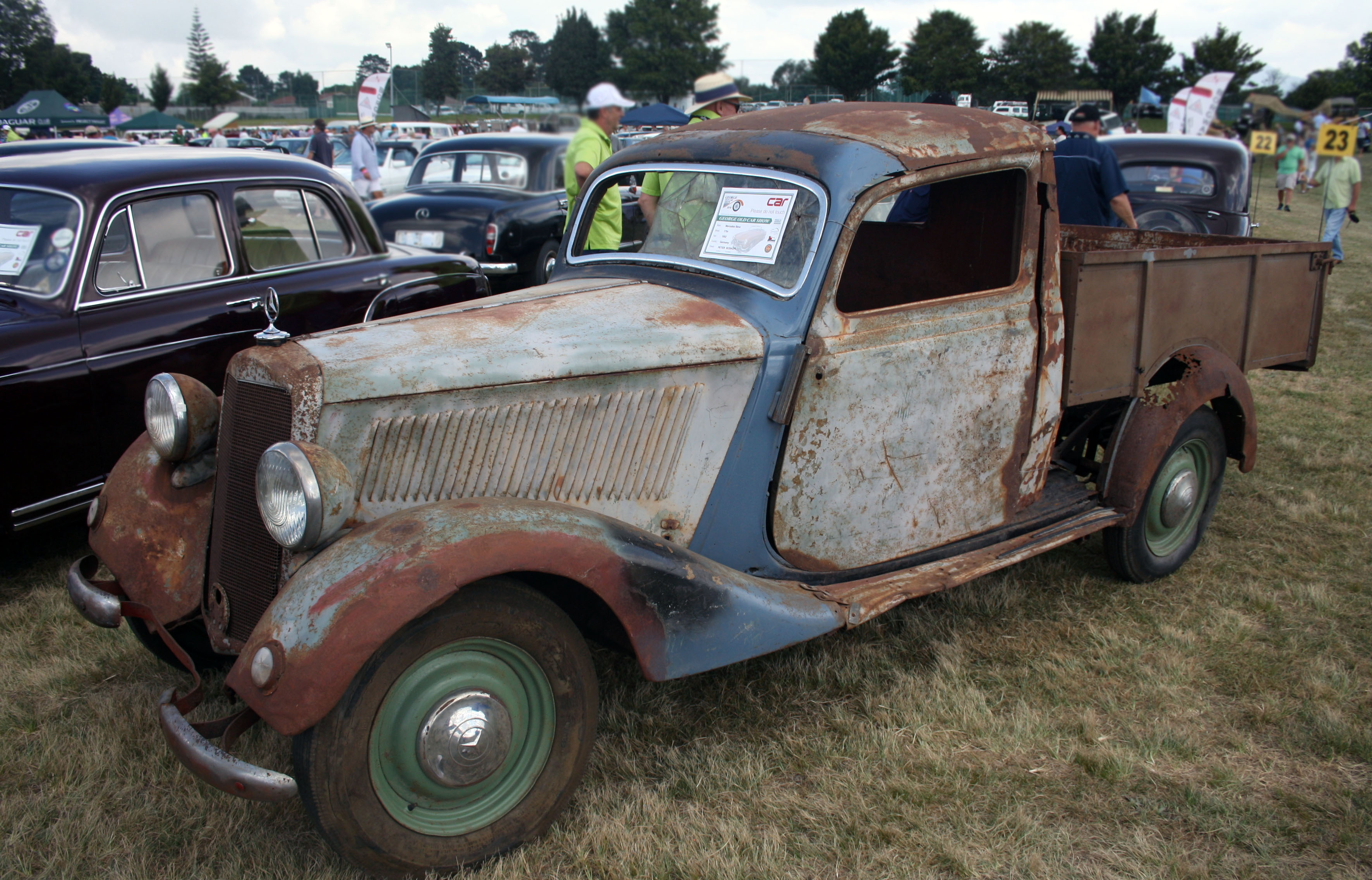
An old Mercedes-Benz at the George Old Car Show in 2016.

The George Old Car Show started in 1997 on Paul Fick's farm "Blackwood" near Victoria Bay. A total of 80 cars were on show and food stalls were provided by the George Lions Club. The 2nd show was held at the George Riding Club in 1998 and approximately 250 cars and tractors were on show. The new car dealers were invited to display their latest models and the show was well supported by the public. Various displays like dog shows, gymnastics, a horse parade and a drive-by so that clubs could show off their cars, entertained the public. Arts in the park and food stalls as well as a well-stocked beer garden entertained those who were tired of looking at cars. A model car show was also laid on. The George Old Car Show was held at the riding club until 2000 when it once again ran out of space and had to seek larger grounds.

The 4th George Old Car Show was moved to the P.W. Botha College in York Street, George. Ample space for show cars, tractors and motorcycles was available on the site as well as large grounds for public parking. The hostels are available for accommodation to exhibitors and a full-time arena program held the public's attention. The school provided food stalls and the income benefited the school fund. The 8th George Old Car Show was held in February 2004 and was by then rated as the 2nd largest motor show in South Africa and was supported by Car magazine. A total of 750 cars dated from 1901 to the latest models were on show. Forty restored tractors and a large variety of motorcycles were on show. The model car show proved to be more popular than ever and more than 5000 models were on display and for sale. The "arts in the park" had also evolved into a show of its own. Various motor clubs were in attendance.

As this is not a static show all clubs had the opportunity to take part in the drive-by. The show has continued to grow, both in the number of exhibitors as well as in popularity with each successive year.

=== George Cheese Festival ===
An annual event held in winter time since 2002, the George Cheese Festival is a popular family festival catering to both the seasoned & veteran cheese & wine enthusiasts.

Cheese Makers, Wine Cellars & recently Chocolatiers have presented their cheese, wine & chocolate pairings to the public over a three-day period.

In 2013, the festival was expanded to include a gala evening to kick off the start of the festival with a stage performance by Steve Hofmeyr.

=== George NBM Sevens Premier League ===
The inaugural Sevens Premier League staged in George on 14–15 December 2012 was a rip-roaring success both on and off the field.

== Churches ==
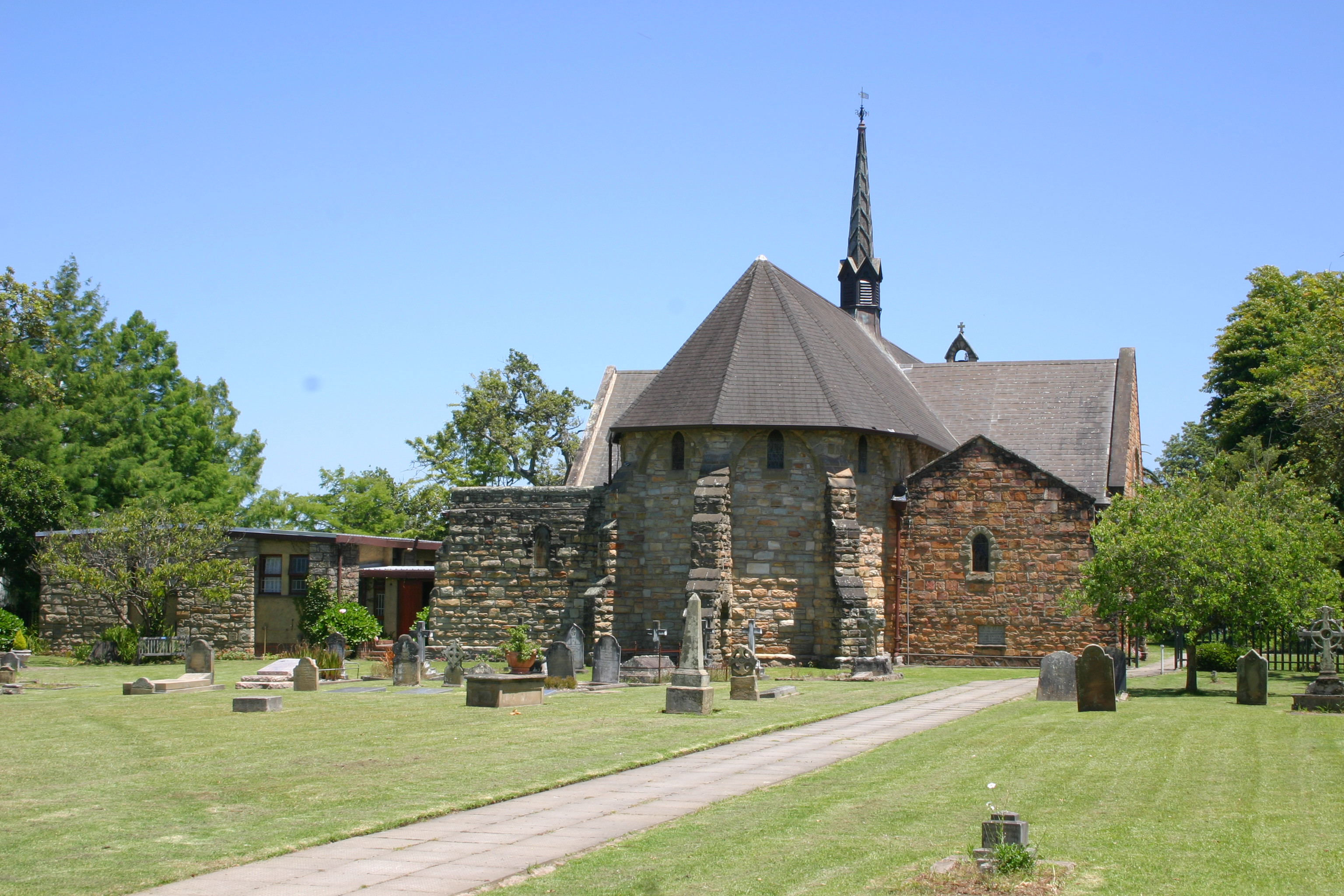
St Mark's Cathedral

Pacaltsdorp Church is the oldest in the Southern Cape and the 6th oldest in the country, completed in 1825. The Norman-style church has thick stonewalls and features a tall square tower topped by battlements. Across the road is the little mud house in which the first missionary, Charles Pacalt of the London Missionary Society, lived after arriving in 1813.

The Dutch Reformed Mother Church was consecrated in 1842 after taking 12 years to build with its 23-metre domed tower and 1 metre thick walls. It is the 7th oldest church house in South Africa. It was constructed by a supervisor and a number of skilled slaves who continued to work as 'apprentices' after the emancipation of slaves in 1834.

In 1841, the Roman Catholic Church appointed its first priest in George; 1843 saw the completion of their church building. That building, St Peter & St Paul Catholic Church in Meade Street, is the oldest Roman Catholic building in South Africa.

St Mark's Anglican Cathedral, designed by Sophy Gray and built in 1850, attained cathedral status in 1911. It was the smallest cathedral in the Southern Hemisphere until extensions in 1924–25. The nave is the oldest section. Its most distinctive feature is the number of stained glass windows in relation to its size.

== Education ==
=== Primary and secondary education ===
Schools include the Afrikaans-medium George High School established in 1947 and Hoërskool Outeniqua established in 1923. The English medium school is York High School and there is also a double medium technical school named Eden Technical High School (formerly PW Botha College). Several independent schools have been established such as Glenwood House, an English medium co-ed school from Grade 000 to Grade 12.

=== Tertiary education ===
George is the tertiary hub of the Southern Cape, with some public and private institutions providing education at various campuses.

- South Cape College is a public further education and training college. It has six campuses, one being in George.
- Nelson Mandela Metropolitan University (a campus Nelson Mandela University based in Gqeberha), Saasveld, offers two centres of excellence – the Centre for Resource Management and the Centre for Business and Information Technology studies.

== Transport ==
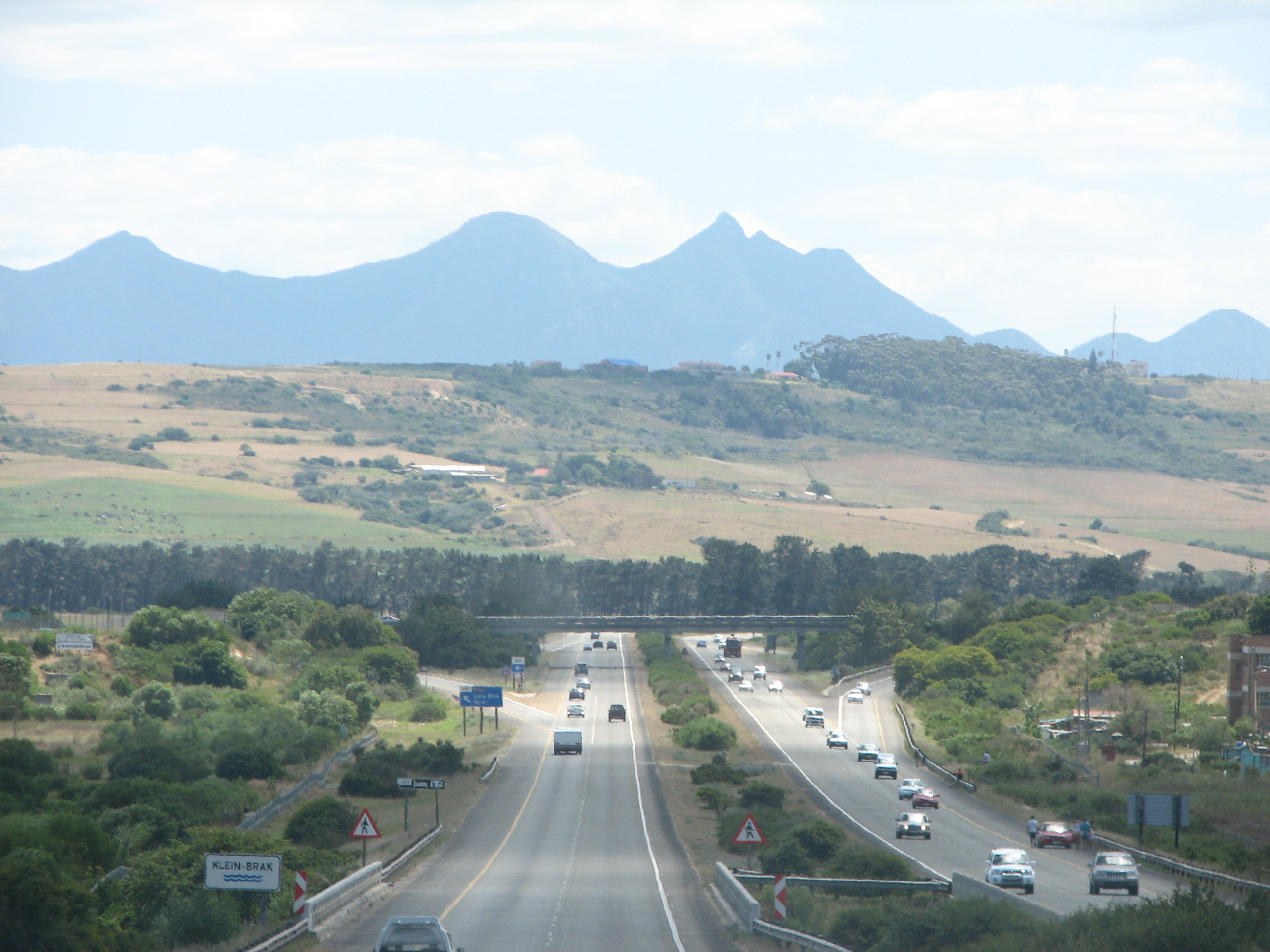
N2 Freeway between Mossel Bay and George

=== Road ===
The N2 national route passes by George in an east–west direction along the coast; George is 420 kilometres (260 mi) east of Cape Town and 330 kilometres (210 mi) west of Port Elizabeth. The N9 and N12 national routes start in George and run concurrently north over the Outeniqua Pass; on the other side of the pass they divide, with the N12 continuing north to Oudtshoorn and then through Meiringspoort to Beaufort West, while the N9 runs northeast to Graaff-Reinet and Colesberg.

=== Rail ===
There is no scheduled passenger service to George. Rovos Rail and the Union Limited however offer vintage train trips to the Garden Route. The Outeniqua Choo Tjoe steam train offered leisure rides between George and Mosselbay but closed in 2009.

=== Air ===
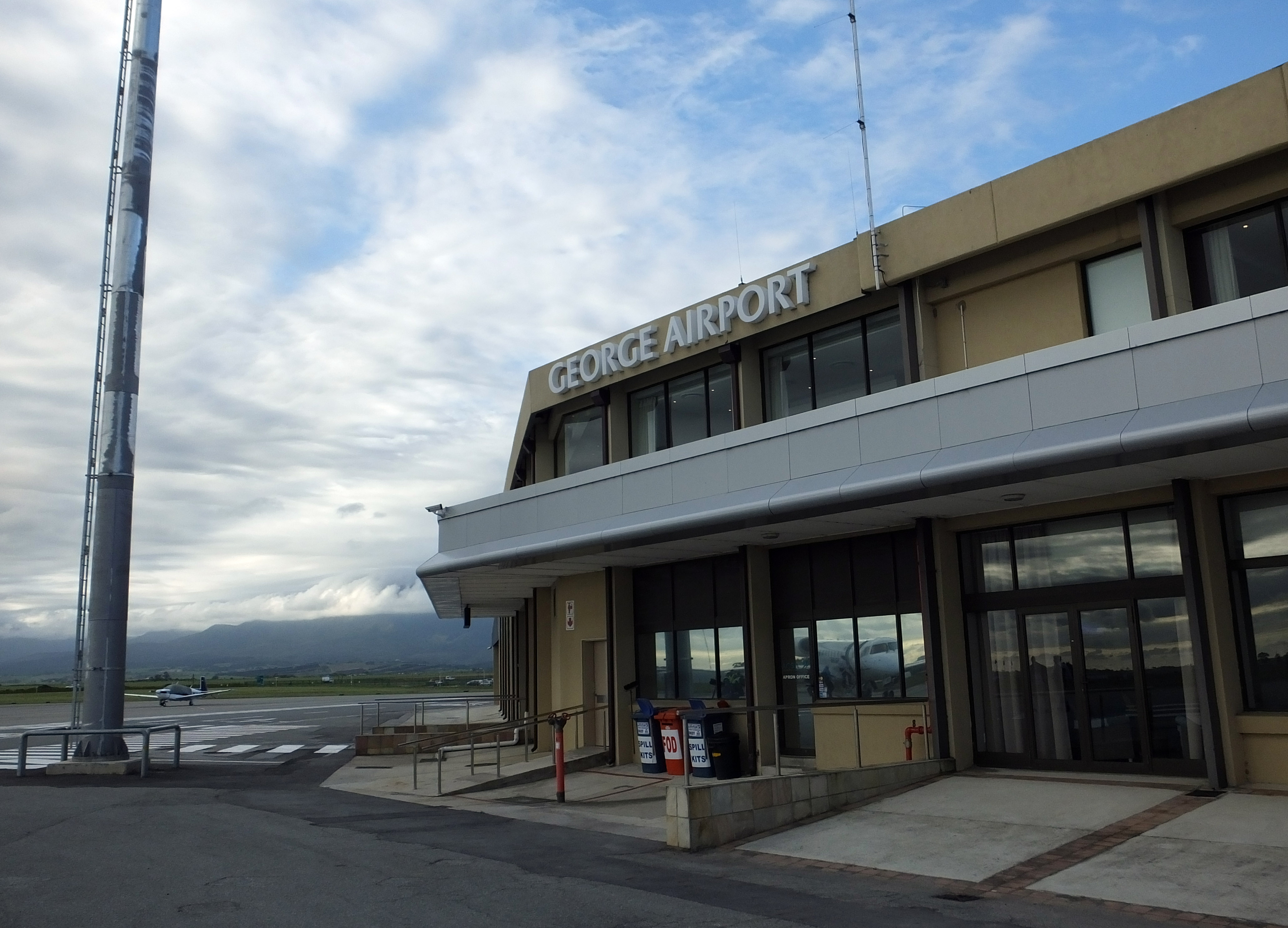
View of George Airport.

George Airport (IATA code GRJ), situated approximately 7 km from the city centre, has scheduled flights to Cape Town International Airport, King Shaka International Airport (Durban), Bram Fischer International Airport (Bloemfontein) and OR Tambo International Airport (Johannesburg).

=== Public transport ===
A public bus service branded Go George was launched in 2014. Routes now cover a significant portion of the city.

== Tallest structures ==
The majority of structures in George are limited to low-mid rise development, most of which is in the commercial sector. The tallest structure in George is the Sentech Tower, which is a radio and television transmitter tower located at the foot of the Outeniqua mountains (33°55′39″S 22°27′1″E) This is followed by the Telkom Tower located in the George CBD and the FAGG Radar Tower (55m) located at the George Airport.

The tallest building in George is the airport radar tower. The concrete tower stands at 45m and 8 storeys (including the spherical radome, it stands at 55m). The George Medi-Clinic building (previously Lamprecht Clinic) stands at 40m and 8 storeys.

== Local government ==
The Executive Mayor of George is Councillor Jacqulique von Brandis, from the Democratic Alliance.

== Coat of arms ==
Municipality (1) – By 1931, the municipality had adopted a pseudo-heraldic "coat of arms", which was depicted on a cigarette card issued in that year. The shield was quartered in sky blue and gold, the quarters separated by a white-edged red cross and depicting (1) a mountain, (2) a Knysna loerie, (3) flowers and (4) an oak tree. A bushbuck stood above the shield. The motto was Semper amabile.

Municipality (2) – On 30 April 1957, the council approved a new coat of arms, designed by Ivan Mitford-Barberton and H. Ellis Tomlinson. The arms were granted by the College of Arms on 6 August 1958, and were later registered at the Bureau of Heraldry in April 1994.

The arms are : Quarterly, Gules and Argent, a cross per cross counterchanged, between in the first quarter a horse courant of the second, in the second quarter a Knysna loerie perched upon a branch in bend sinister, in the third quarter a protea flower slipped and leaved, proper, and in the fourth quarter an oak tree fructed, the trunk couped, Argent. In layman's terms : the shield is quartered red and silver, the quarters are separated by a cross, and they depict (1) a running silver horse, (2) a Knysna loerie perched on a branch, (3) a protea flower with stem and leaves and (4) an oak tree. The crest is a bushbuck, and the motto remains Semper amabile.

George Divisional Council coat of arms (1962)

Divisional council arms – The George divisional council (the local authority which administered the rural areas outside the town) assumed a coat of arms in 1961, and registered them with the Cape Provincial Administration in June 1962.

The arms, designed by Schalk Pienaar, were : Vert, on a chief dancetty Argent three apples slipped and leaved proper; a base barry wavy of six Argent and Azure. In layman's terms : a green shield displaying at the top three apples on a silver stripe with a zig-zag edge and at the bottom six wavy silver and blue stripes. The crest was a protea flower, the supporters were two bushbuck, and the motto Regio melle dulcior.

== Gallery ==
George

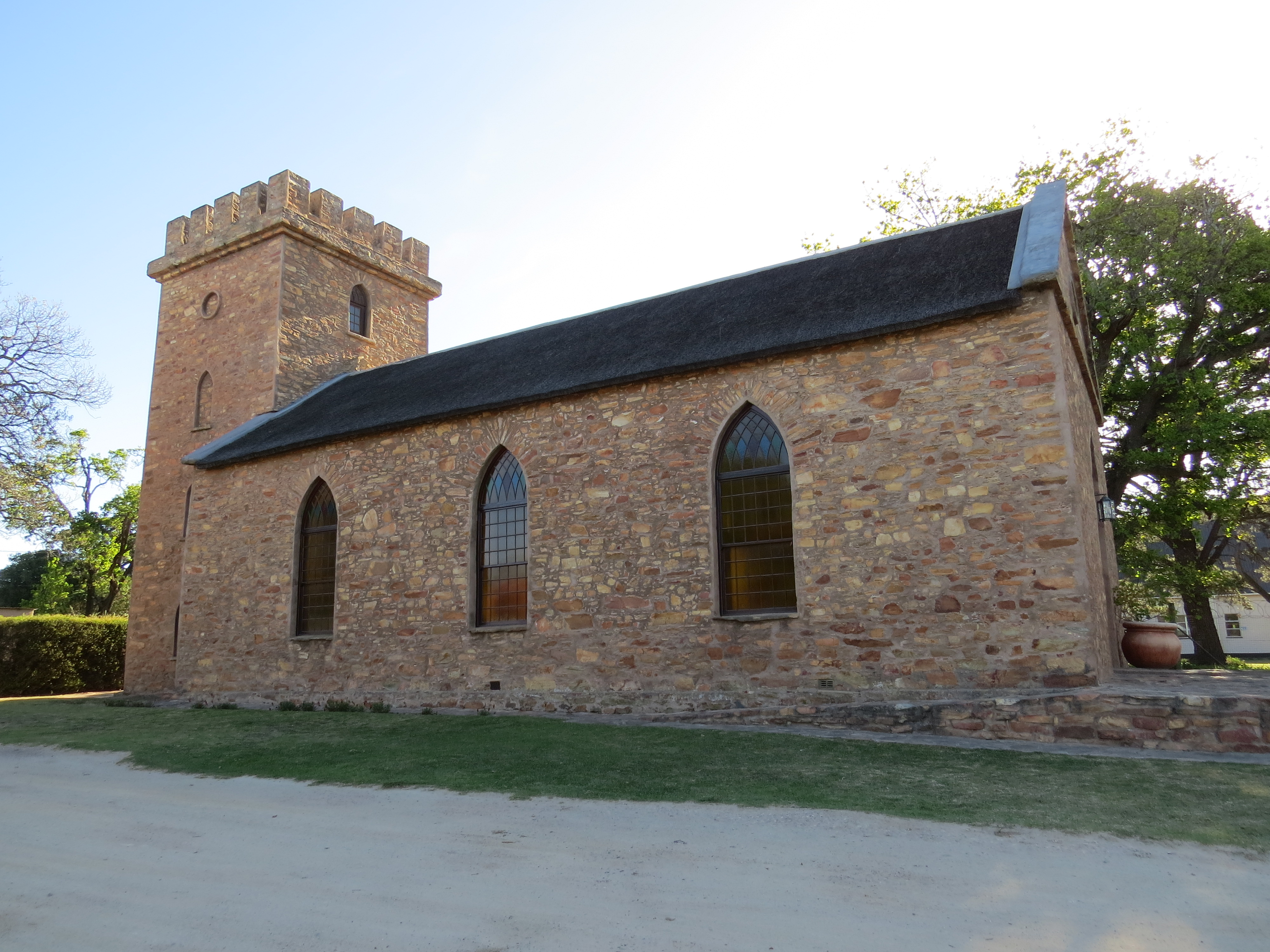
The church at Pacaltsdorp.

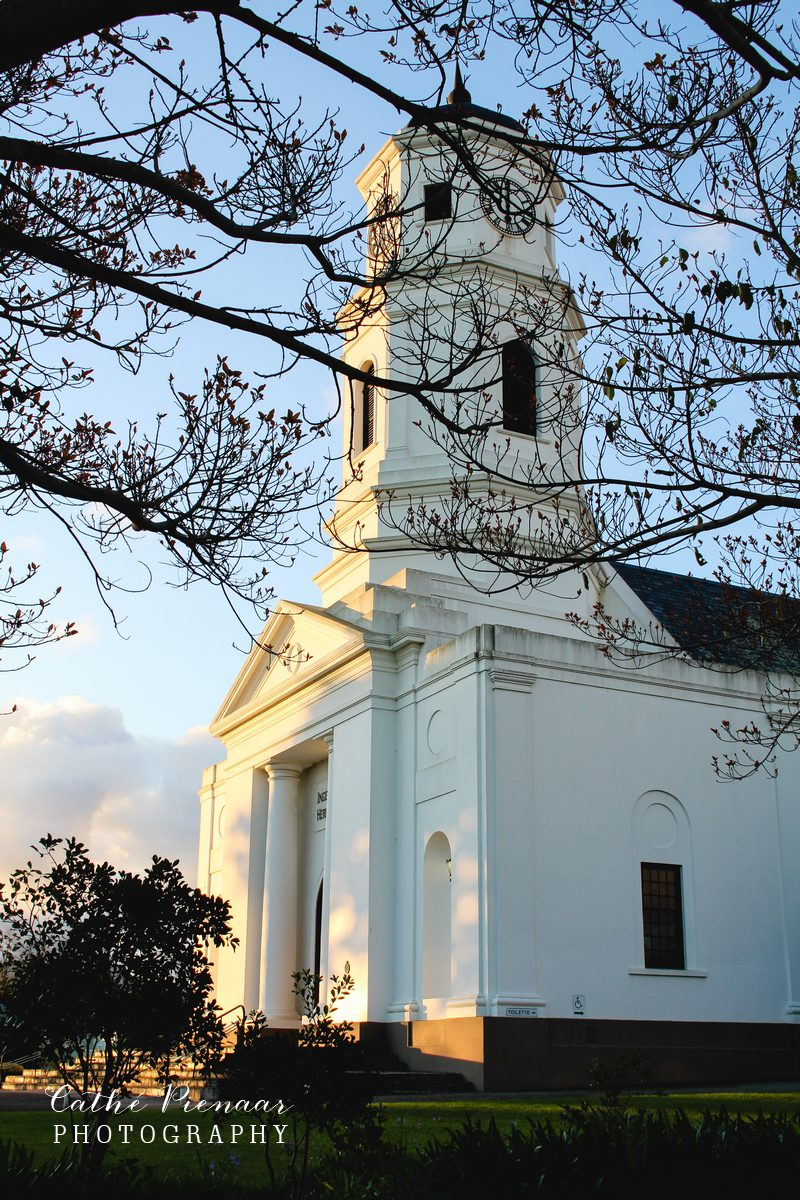
The Moederkerk.

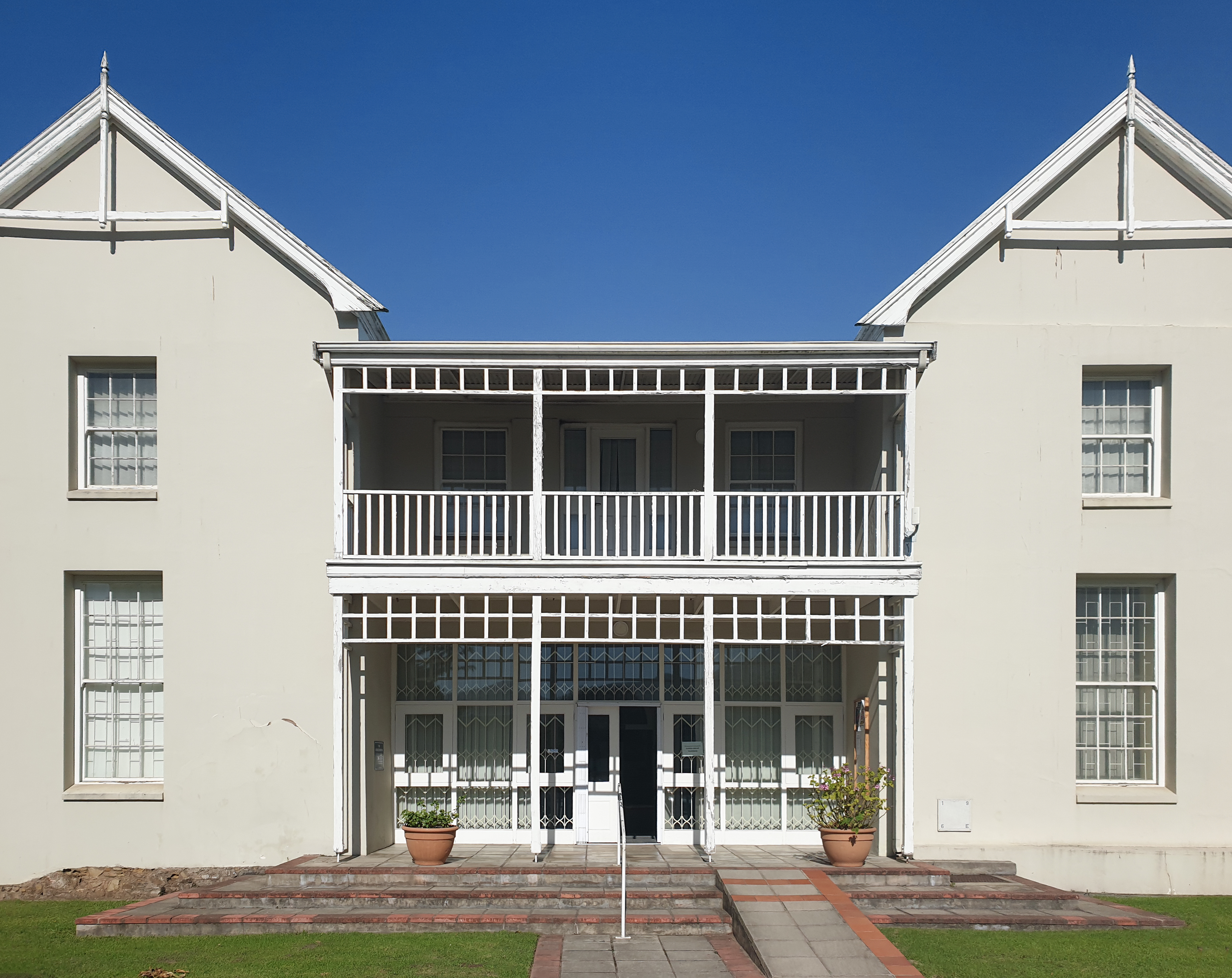
George Museum

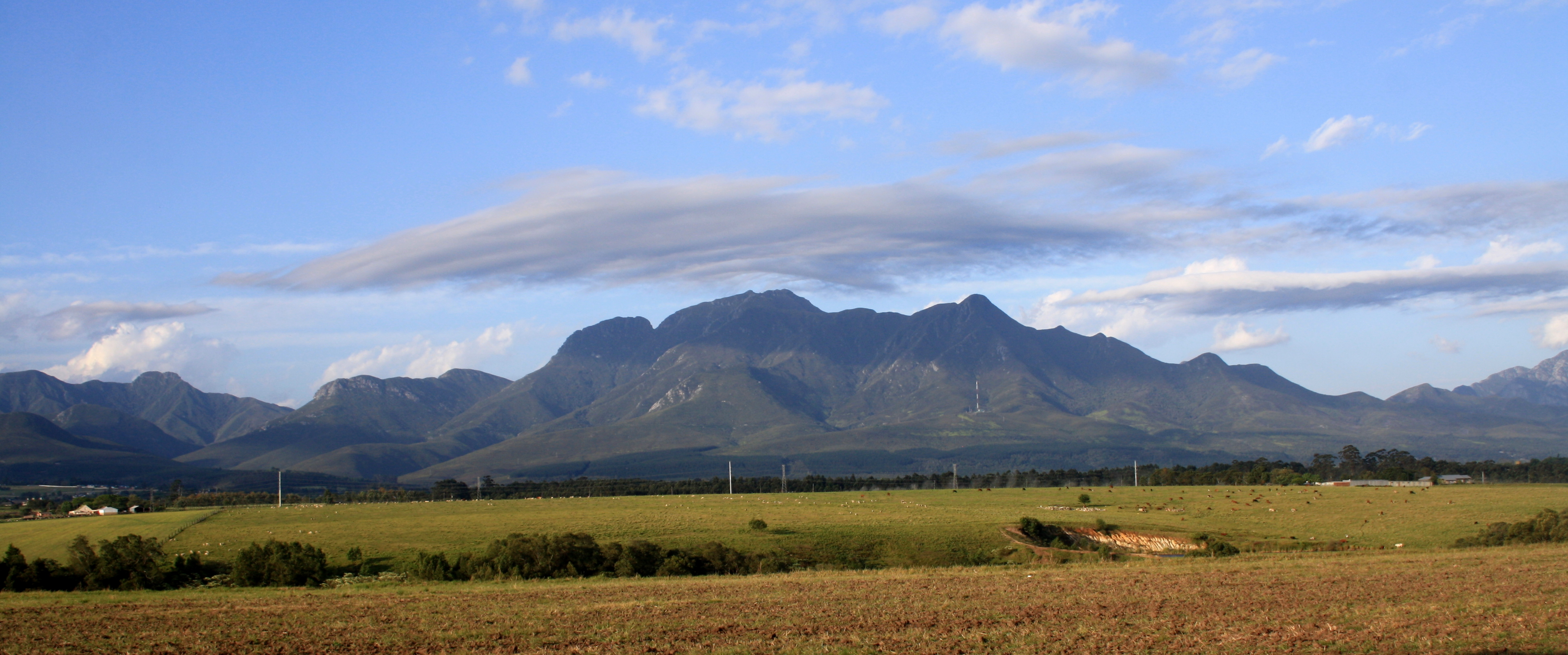
The Outeniqua Mountains

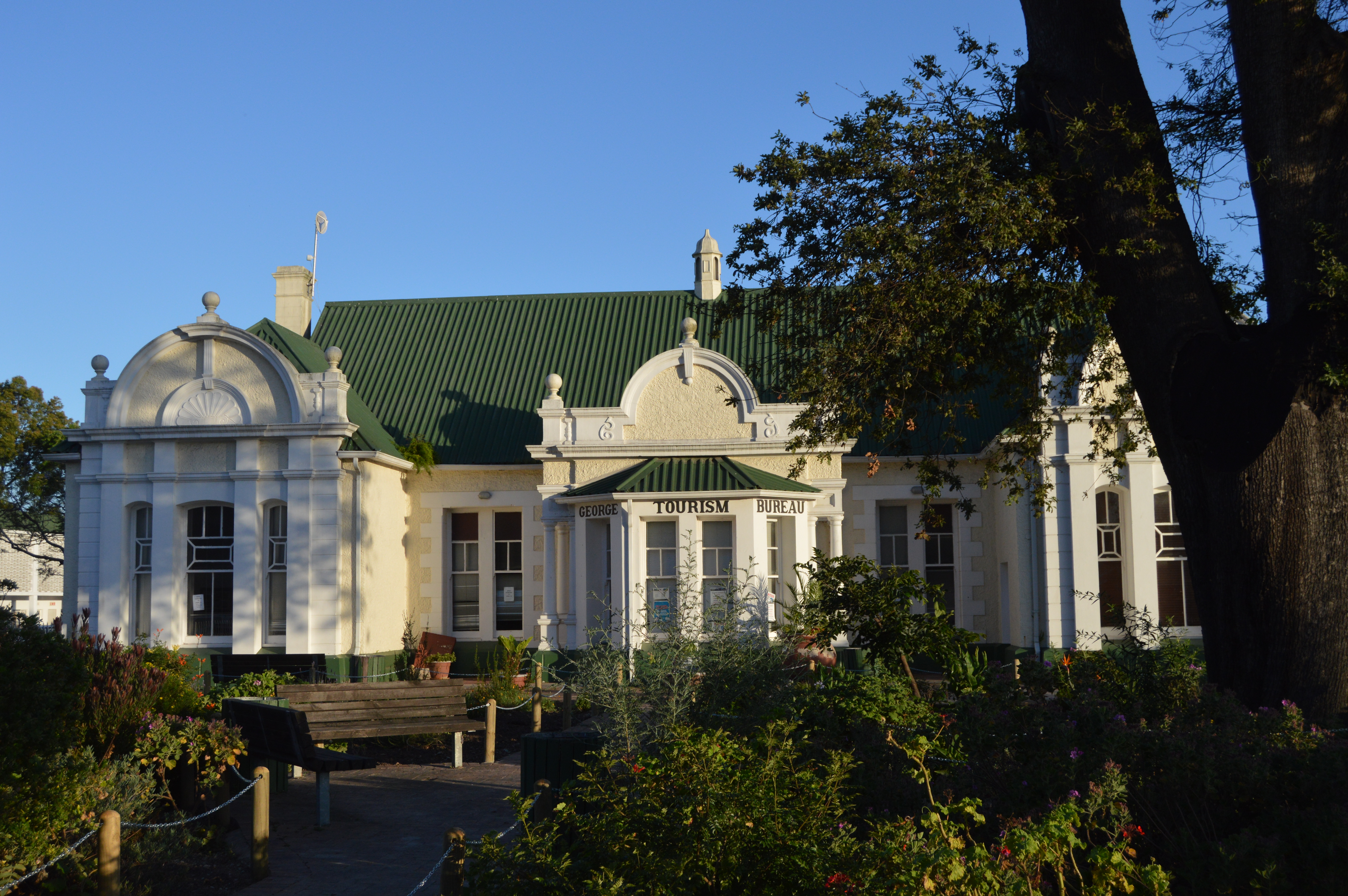
George Tourism Office

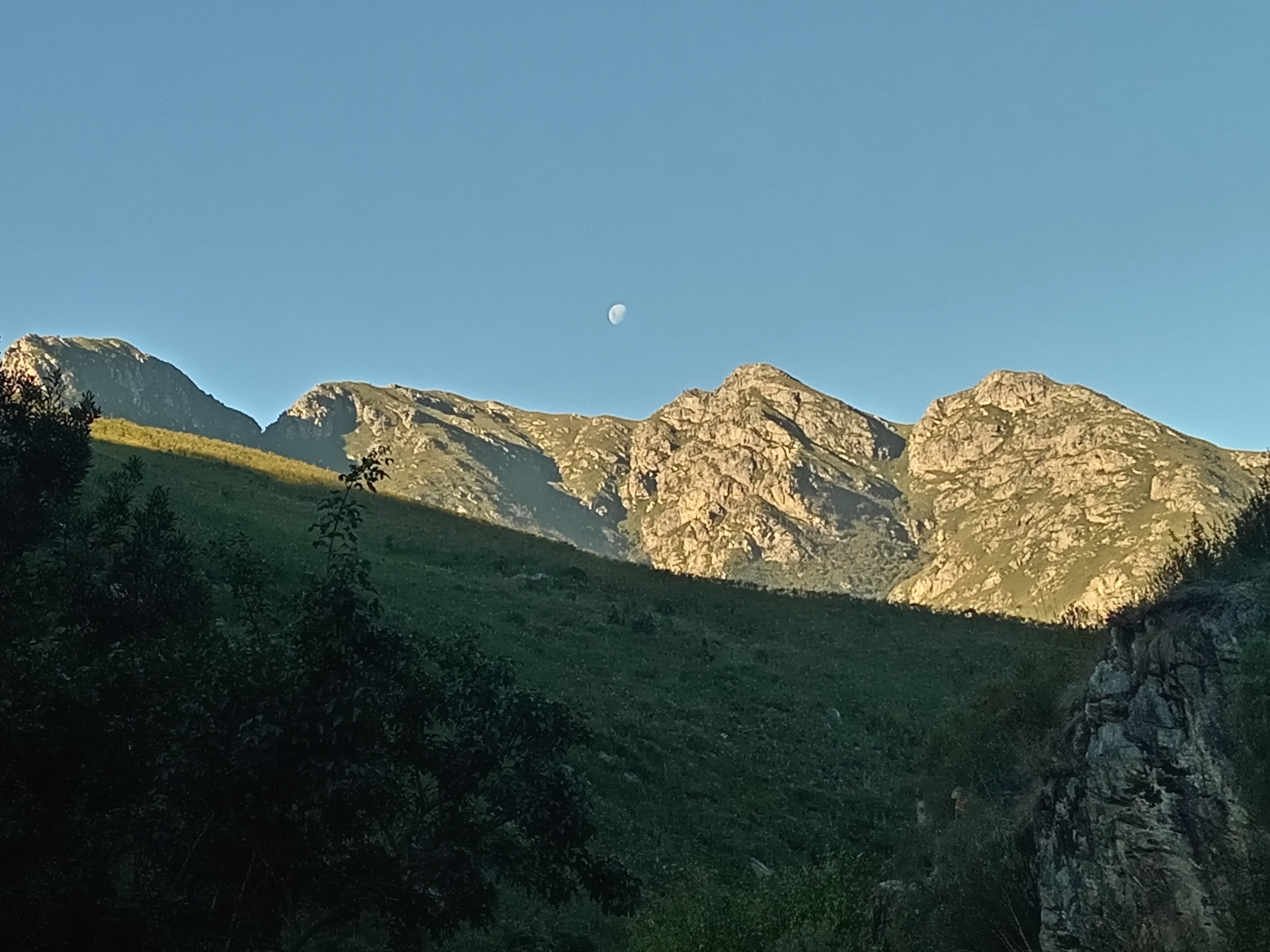
The Montagu Pass

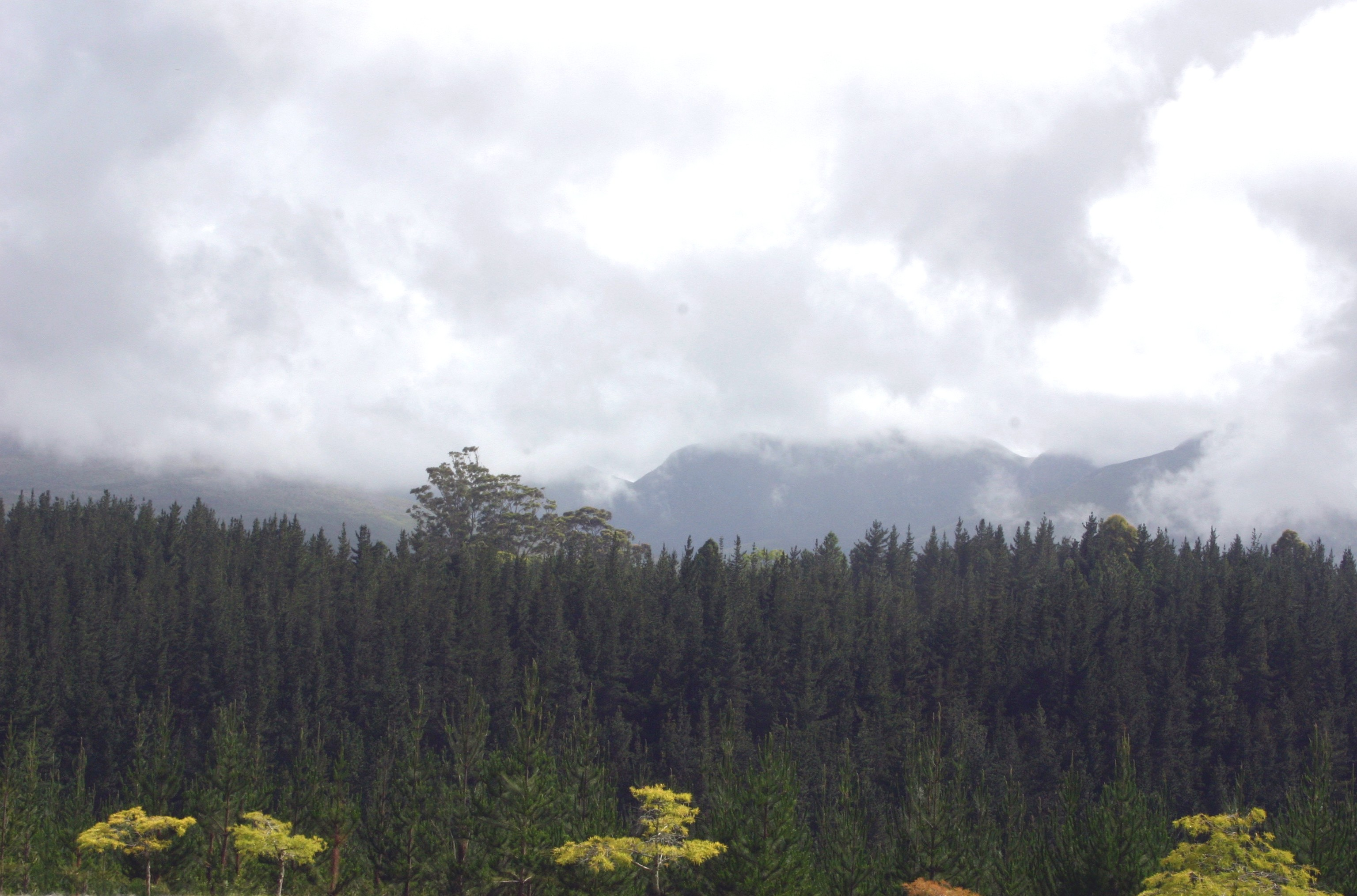
Saasveld Forestry College

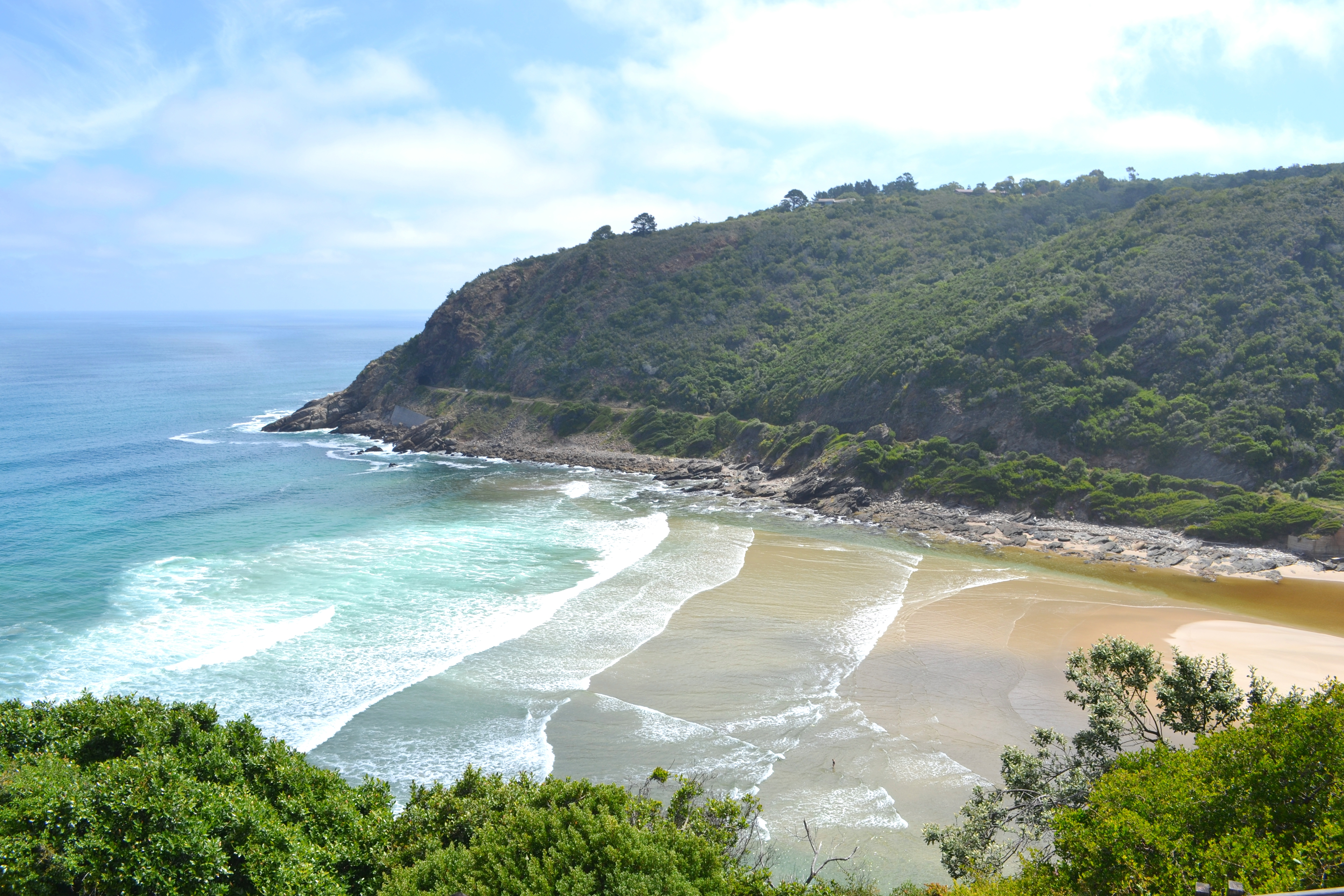
The Kaaimans River mouth.

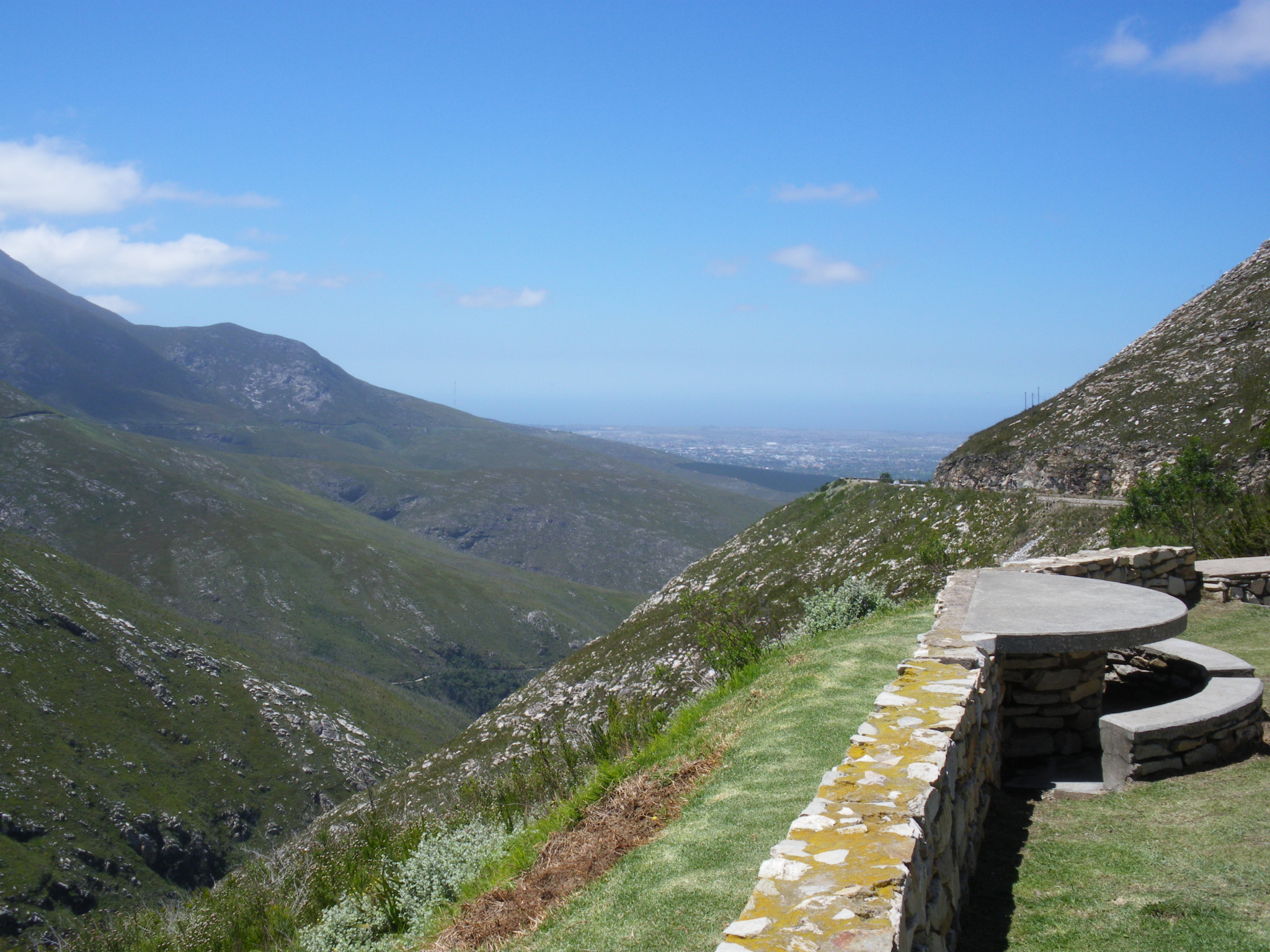
The Outeniqua Pass

== Suburbs ==
The City of George is made up of a number of suburbs:

- Ballots View
- Bergsig
- Blanco
- Borchards
- Bo-Dorp
- Bos en Dal
- Campher's Drift
- Conville
- Denneoord
- Delville Park
- Denver Park
- Dormehls Drift
- Eastern Extension
- Eden
- Fernridge
- George Central (CBD)
- George Industria
- George South
- Glen Barrie
- Glenwood
- Groeneweide Park
- Heatherlands
- Heather Park
- King George Park
- Lawaaikamp
- Le Vallia
- Loerie Park
- New Dawn
- Pacaltsdorp
- Protea Park
- Rooi Rivier-Rif
- Rosemoor
- Tamsui Industria
- Thembalethu
- Twee Rivieren

== Notable people ==
- Ernie Els – professional golfer
- Ammiel Bushakevitz – classical concert pianist
- Meryl Cassie – singer, actress
- Megan Alatini – (née Cassie) singer, TV personality
- Marco Wentzel – former Springbok
- Carla Swart – professional cyclist
- Zane Kirchner- Springbok rugby player
- CJ Stander – Irish rugby player
- Anel Oosthuizen – Olympic race walker
- Lennox Bacela – professional football player
- Demi-Leigh Nel-Peters – Miss Universe 2017
- Bianca Buitendag – professional surfer
- Elvis Blue – Singer
- Duhan van der Merwe – Scotland international rugby player

== See also ==
- List of heritage sites in George and Mossel Bay
