= Go George =

Bus service in George, South Africa

GO GEORGE
- Founded: 2014; 12 years ago
- Commenced operation: 08 December 2014
- Service area: George
- Service type: Bus
- Routes: 34
- Fleet: 133 buses
- Annual ridership: 6.1 million (FY2024–25)
- Website: www.gogeorge.org.za

GO GEORGE is a public bus service in George, South Africa.

== History ==
In 2003, the Western Cape Government financed the Sandkraal Road Corridor Mobility Strategy, which aimed to improve public transport between Thembalethu Township and the George CBD. The strategy was later expanded into the George Integrated Public Transport Network (GIPTN), which operates as GO GEORGE.

Following the introduction of the National Land Transport Act in 2009, George became eligible for Public Transport Network Grant funding. Funding was approved in 2013. The first phase of GO GEORGE was launched on 8 December 2014, between the CBD and northern and eastern suburbs. Additional phases followed, expanding services to other parts of the city.

== Statistics ==
Revenue and Passenger trips
Fiscal Year (July–June)	Revenue (R)	Passenger trips
2015–16	32,532,521	no data
2016–17	37,301,627(▲14.7%)	no data
2017–18	39,419,283(▲5.7%)	no data
2018–19	44,197,337(▲12.1%)	4,123,489
2019–20	41,133,084(▼7.0%)	no data
2020–21	39,534,679(▼3.9%)	no data
2021–22	50,650,489(▲28.1%)	4,471,944
2022–23	63,779,838(▲26.0%)	5,273,304(▲18.0%)
2023–24	77,498,662(▲21.5%)	5,917,644(▲12.2%)
2024–25	86,237,000(▲11.3%)	6,092,448(▲3.0%)
Source: George Municipality
