= Thembalethu =

- Location within Western Cape Location within South Africa
- Coordinates: 34.0049511°S 22.4690654°E
- Country: South Africa
- Province: Western Cape
- District: Garden Route
- Municipality: George
- Established: 1982

Area
  - Total: 6.49 km^{2} (2.51 sq mi)

Population (2011)
  - Total: 43,103
  - Density: 6,640/km^{2} (17,200/sq mi)

Racial makeup (2011)
  - Black African: 93.4%
  - Coloured: 5.5%
  - Indian/Asian: 0.1%
  - White: 0.1%
  - Other: 0.8%

First languages (2011)
  - Xhosa: 83.2%
  - Afrikaans: 8.5%
  - English: 3.2%
  - Other: 5.1%
- Time zone: UTC+2 (SAST)
- Postal code (street): 6529
- PO box: 6545
- Area code: 044

Thembalethu is a township in Western Cape, South Africa. The township is on the Garden Route and forms part of the George Municipality. The name of the township "Thembalethu" is Xhosa meaning "Our Hope".

== History ==
During the 19th and 20th centuries various laws were introduced in South Africa to remove black communities from land they occupied in order to make way for white farmers or commercial activities by the then ruling white government. As early as 1879 the Native Location Act (Act 37 of 1879) restricted the setting up of locations on crown land (government-owned land). Other laws discriminatory to non-Europeans were enacted laying a foundation for the implementation of Apartheid before the National Party's ascendance to governance in 1948.

The Group Areas Act (Act 41 of 1950) was one of the cornerstones of Apartheid policy that was implemented by the National Party. The Act assigned racial groups to different residential and business sections in urban areas. The Group Areas Act led to a massive programme of forced removals in South Africa and subsequently in George as well. Under the guidance of Apartheid legislation, George implemented the Group Areas Act of 1950 which led to Rosemoor and Pacaltsdorp being declared Coloured Group Areas. Additional townships were established to accommodate people who were classified as coloured and had been forcibly removed from other areas. George fell under the Cape Province Coloured Labour Preference Act of 1957. Any employer wishing to employ a black worker was required to obtain a Coloured Labour Clearance Certificate from the department of manpower stating that no suitable coloured person is available for the position. The authorities had not made any plans to attempt to provide land or housing for black people before acquiring Harvey's Bay (an informal settlement largely occupied by black people in 1976) for the purpose of housing black municipal workers. Harvey's Bay came to be known as Lawaaikamp and the municipality provided it with basic services such as toilets and refuse removals.

In 1982 a portion of farmland south of Lawaaikamp, Sandkraal (also known as Thyolora) was zoned a group area for black people. At first many black residents of Lawaaikamp welcomed the move to Sandkraal. However, when they realised that the government would only provide site and service schemes, rather than proper brick houses, resistance to the new township began to grow. The development of Sandkraal commenced towards the end of 1983. The plan had about 1 200 sites which could provide housing for about 10 000 people. The then Deputy Minister of Constitutional Development and Planning, Piet Badenhorst, announced that residents of Lawaaikamp would “voluntarily” move to a new and first black township 5 kilometres away from the town in George. According to Badenhorst 512 sites had services such as water, storm water drainage, sewage connections, electricity network and high mast lighting which served the entire area and the connection points for each site. However, community members at the time, complained that, “no Infrastructure has been provided and residents queue daily with buckets, waiting for the municipal water-truck to do its rounds. In Lawaaikamp there were only five taps to serve the entire community… in Sandkraal there are none.” The government had planned to upgrade Lawaaikamp for coloured housing therefore black residents came under increasing pressure to vacate the area. Serious tensions and conflict between black residents of and the authorities in George during the mid-1980s. In February 1986 Mr Rhontsi Mbuyiwelo Jonas Jack, Mr Skosana Meanwell Lekayi and one other resident were shot dead by the police during street protests. Some community members retaliated by the killing of Mr Afrika Nqumse, an employee of the Development Board who was regarded as collaborator in the forced removals. Workers of Lawaaikamp staged a one day stay-away in protest against the shootings. The George Municipality responded by dismissing more than 400 municipal workers who had participated in the stay-away. On 3 April 1986 the George Municipality bulldozed 150 houses in Lawaaikamp and later issued a deadline of 30 June 1986 for residents of Lawaaikamp to vacate the area. Residents continued to oppose the removals and 180 people were detained, including members of the George Civic Association which had been elected at a mass meeting earlier in the year to represent the people of Lawaaikamp. As a result of the resistance and pressure from outside, the municipality extended the deadline to 31 December 1986. A number of residents eventually moved from Lawaaikamp to Sandkraal. By the end of 1986 Sandkraal became bigger than Lawaaikamp. However, about 2000 people stayed on in Lawwaikamp. Many of the residents who moved to Sandkraal saw an opportunity of building their own homes and many of them came from other towns in the Eastern Cape.

Lawaaikamp was rezoned as for Coloured occupation on 12 July 1987 as the George Municipality attempted to force black people to move to Sandkraal. Lawaaikamp residents refused to move and was then declared an illegal squatter camp and a health hazard. This enabled authorities to forcibly remove its residents to Sandkraal, by enforcing the Prevention of illegal Squatting Act (Act 52 of 1951) and the National Building Regulations Building Standards Act (Act 103 of 1977). Through public protests, demonstrations and court proceedings led by the George Civic Association, Lawaaikamp was eventually provided low cost infrastructure.

Since 1982 Sandkraal was the local authority for the black people, a form of an independent municipal region for black people under apartheid. As the result of the Local Government Transition Act (Act 209 of 1993), Sandkraal was then amalgamated into the Greater George Transitional Council that later became the George Local Municipality in 1995 . In 1999 Sandkraal was renamed to Thembalethu and in 2013 Sandkraal Road and the continuing extending road Albert Street were renamed to Nelson Mandela Boulevard.

== Geography ==
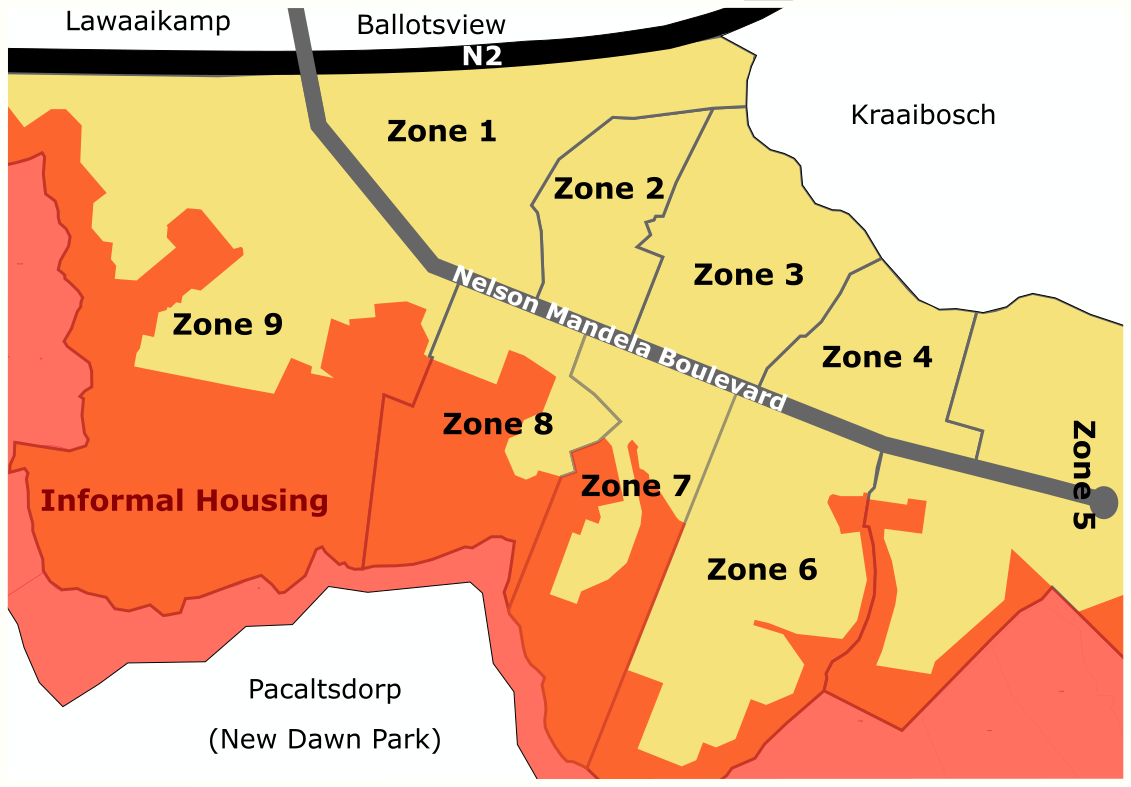
A diagram showing the sections of Thembalethu and the connecting informal settlements.

Thembalethu is situated south of George, over the N2 and adjacent to Pacaltsdorp. The suburb is sectioned into 9 zones which are cut through in half by the Nelson Mandela Boulevard which stretches from York Street and ends in Thembalethu. The Nelson Mandela Boulevard is also the only entry and exit route to and out of Thembalethu. On entry, the zones are placed in a clock wise direction with zones 1 to 4 on the left, zone 5 straight ahead and zones 6 to 9 on the right in an ascending order. Thembalethu has a lot of informal settlements growing west of the township joining zones 5 to 9.

== Demographics ==
Population Groups
Group	Percentage
Black African	93.4%
Coloured	5.5%
Indian Asian	0.1%
White	0.1%
Other	0.8%

Languages
Languages	Percentage
IsiXhosa	83.2%
Afrikaans	8.5%
English	3.2%
Sesotho	1.1%
Sign Language	0.8%
IsiNdebele	0.3%
Sitswana	0.3%
Xitsonga	0.3%
SiSwati	0.1%
Tshivenda	0.1%
Others	1.3%

== Education ==
List of Primary Schools in Thembalethu

- MM Matheza Primary School
- Thembalethu Primary School
- Tabatha Primary School
- Thyolora Primary School

List of High Schools in Thembalethu

- Imizamo Yethu Secondary School
- Thembalethu High School
- Jonga Secondary School
