= Moederkerk, George =

Coordinates: 33.9562°S 22.4631°E

Moederkerk
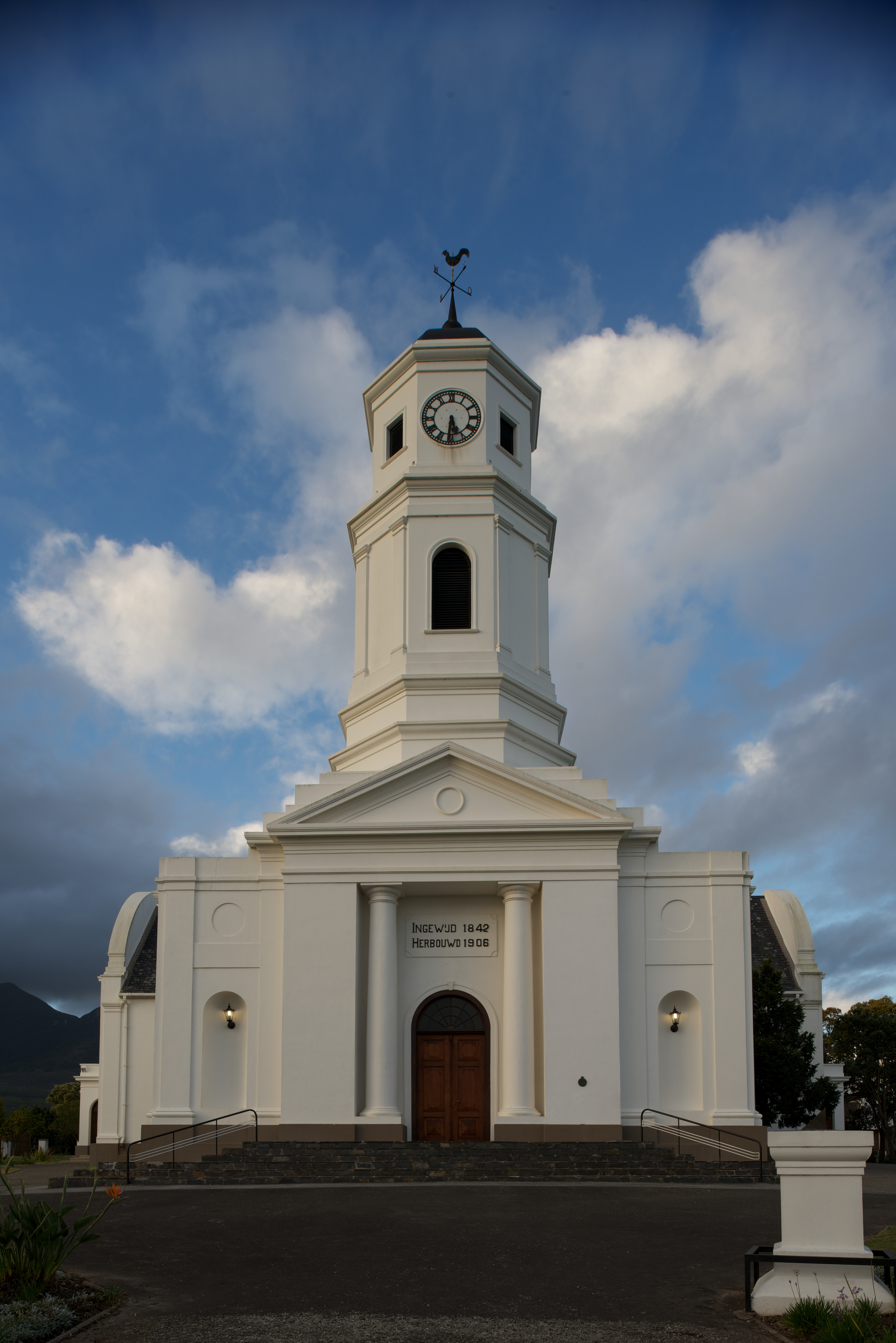
- Moederkerk
- Moederkerk
- Location: George, Western Cape (Garden Route District Municipality)
- Country: South Africa
- Denomination: Dutch Reformed Church

History
- Founded: 1842

Architecture
- Functional status: church

The Moederkerk (Mother Church) is a place of worship of the Dutch Reformed Church in George, South Africa. The church was built in 1842. The cornerstone for the church was laid on 14 April 1832. Slaves were used for some of the building work like the digging of the six-foot deep by five-foot wide foundations. Due to financial problems it took 12 years to complete the church and it was consecrated on 9 October 1842. Although a historical building, the church is still active and sermons are held every Sunday.

== List of ministers ==
- Tobias Johannes Herold, 1823–1831
- Johan Stephen Simeon Ballot, 1831–1862
- Arnoldus Gerhard Mart Kuys, 1863–1877
- Christoffel Frederic Jacobus Muller, 1877–1887
- Zacharias Johannes de Beer, 1887–1895
- David Jacob Johannes Rossouw, 1896–1912
- Pieter Truter Stroebel, 1902–1904
- Jan Andries Beyer, 1912–1923
- Johannes Albertus Hurter, 1921–1936
- Philip Petrus van der Merwe, 1925–1928
- Gabriël Jacobus Lötter, 1931–1947
- Jan Stephanus Klopper, 1937–1948
- Daniel Francois du Toit, 1943–1947, 1951–1967
- Johan George Lochner, 1947–1950
- Heinrich Franz Heyman, 1947–1951
- Carl Wilhelm Irene Pistorius, 1948–1953
- Andries Gustav Stephanus Gouws, 1953–1958
- Jacobus Stephanus Marais, 1967–1970
- Bernard Christiaan Lategan, 1968–1969
- Johannes Gerhard Moolman, 1974–1983
- J. A. van de Merwe, 1978–2006
- M. van Rooijen, 1988–1998
- W. Badenhorst, 1984–2004
- H. A. Louw, 1993–current
- H. Bekker, 2005–current
