= Fancourt =

Fancourt is a surname. Notable people with the surname include:

- Daisy Fancourt (born 1990), British associate professor of psychobiology and epidemiology
- Darrell Fancourt (1886–1953), English bass-baritone and actor
- Samuel Fancourt (1678–1768), dissenting minister and projector of circulating libraries
- Thomas Fancourt (1840–1919), Archdeacon of Wellington, New Zealand
- Timothy Fancourt (born 1964), English High Court judge
