= Thomas Fancourt =

Anglican priest (1888–1903)

Thomas Fancourt (22 January 1840 – 1 February 1919) was an Anglican priest, most notably Archdeacon of Wellington from 1888 until his death.

Fancourt was born in Malvern, Worcestershire in 1840. He was educated at Lancing College and St Augustine's College, Canterbury and ordained in 1867. After a curacy at Porirua he was the incumbent at St James, Lower Hutt then St John, Johnsonville before his appointment as Archdeacon. He died at Wellington on 1 February 1919.
