= Native Location Act of 1879 =

South African racial segregation law

The Native Location Act of 1879 was an act of racial segregation in South Africa.
