= Pacaltsdorp =

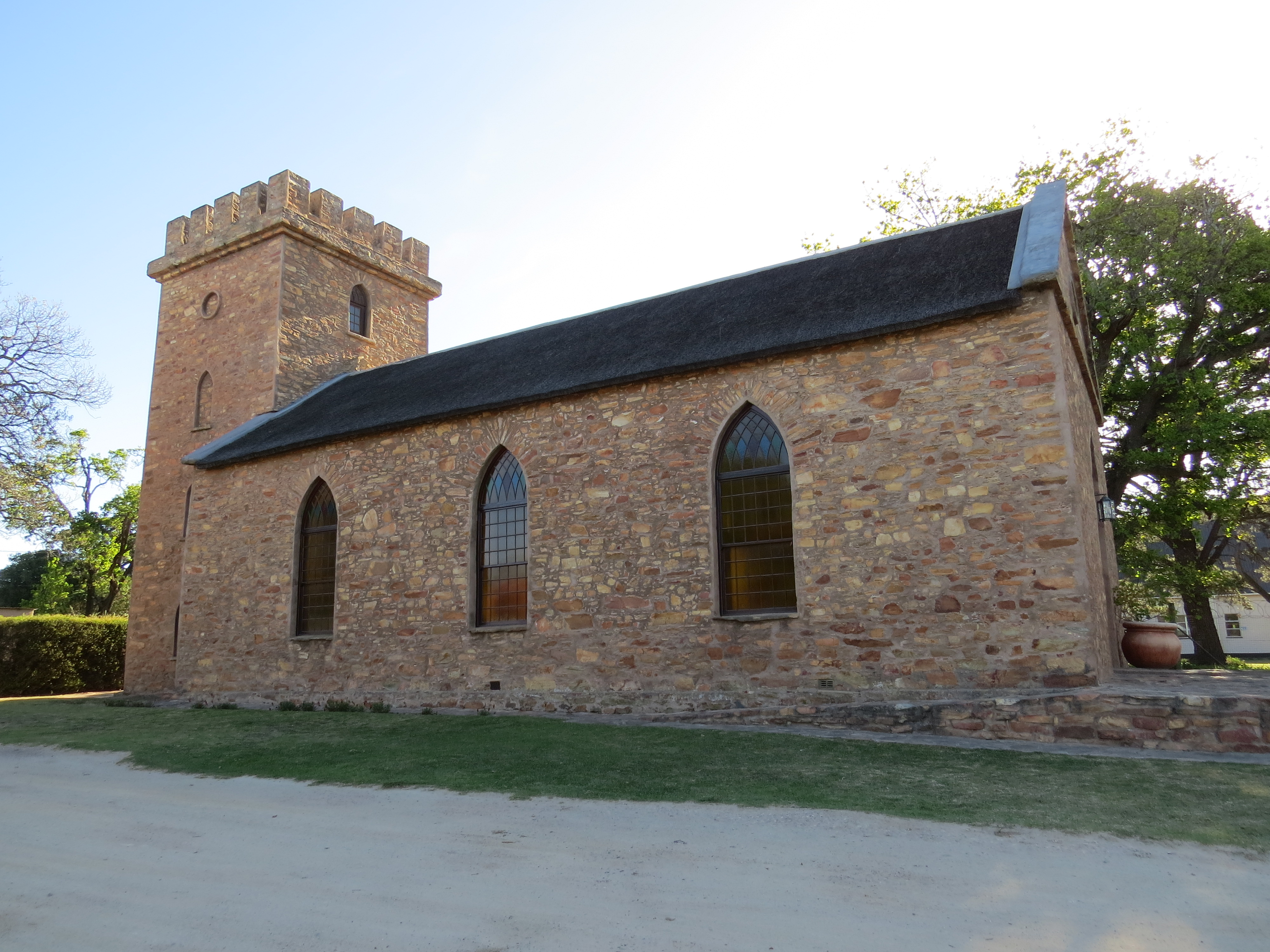
- Church in Pacaltsdorp

- Location within Western Cape Location within South Africa
- Coordinates: 34°1′S 22°27′E
- Country: South Africa
- Province: Western Cape
- District: Garden Route
- Municipality: George

Area
  - Total: 10.19 km^{2} (3.93 sq mi)

Population (2011)
  - Total: 16,400
  - Density: 1,610/km^{2} (4,170/sq mi)

Racial makeup (2011)
  - Black African: 4.7%
  - Coloured: 93.3%
  - Indian/Asian: 0.6%
  - White: 0.7%
  - Other: 0.7%

First languages (2011)
  - Afrikaans: 92.2%
  - English: 4.4%
  - Xhosa: 1.7%
  - Other: 1.7%
- Time zone: UTC+2 (SAST)
- Postal code (street): 6529
- PO box: 6534
- Area code: 044

Pacaltsdorp is a suburb of George, Western Cape. In the Apartheid era, it was the coloured township associated with George but administrated independently. The N2 highway provided the natural boundary between the two, enforced by a curfew.

The mission station Hoogekraal was named Pacaltsdorp after the death of the German-speaking missionary of Czech origin, the Reverend Charles Pacalt in 1818. He was invited by Kaptein Dikkop, leader of a Khoikhoi tribe living in the area. He built up a congregation of about 300 Khoekhoen, slaves and free labourers.

== Buildings ==
A number of historic buildings are preserved - The Stone Church - a Norman-style church, originally built from stone, yellowwood, glass and clay. Rev Pacalt's second mission cottage was constructed in approximately 1813. Consisting of sod walls, a thatch roof and cow-dung floor, it was declared a national monument in 1976. William Anderson built the first manse, a two-storied building with thick stone walls and abundant yellowwood, it was also declared a national monument in 1976.

"The Tree Of Meeting" is a 300-year-old tree, to be found opposite the Pacaltsdorp Post Office, in Missionstreet. The stone building nearby was originally home to some of the first missionaries. There was no church building yet and church services were conducted under this big Essenwood tree.

== Development ==
Prior to 1994 much of Pacaltsdorp was Common land that bordered the Gwaing River and stretched down to the sea, was used for farming. However, in 2005 two large developments, the Oubaai Golf Estate and Le Grande Golf Estate have taken the best of this Common land and all the sea frontage for upmarket development.

== Culture ==
Pacaltsdorp community mostly follow the Christian faith; which coincide with its missionary history. Sports activities such as rugby (Pacaltsdorp Evergreens – est. 1932), cricket (Pacaltsdorp Cricket Club), netball (Pacaltsdorp Netball Club) and others are popular within the community.
