= List of cities and towns in the Western Cape =

This is a list of cities and towns in the Western Cape province of South Africa. They are divided according to the districts in which they are located.

== Cape Metropole ==
The City of Cape Town Metropolitan Municipality

- Atlantis
- Bellville
- Blouberg
- Blue Downs
- Bothasig
- Brackenfell
- Cape Town
- Crossroads
- Delft
- Durbanville
- Eerste River
- Elsie's River
- Fish Hoek
- Goodwood
- Gordon's Bay
- Guguletu
- Hout Bay
- Khayelitsha
- Kraaifontein
- Kuils River
- Langa
- Macassar
- Melkbosstrand
- Mfuleni
- Milnerton
- Mitchell's Plain
- Muizenberg
- Noordhoek
- Nyanga
- Parow
- Philadelphia
- Simon's Town
- Somerset West
- Strand

== West Coast ==
The West Coast District Municipality

- Aurora
- Bitterfontein
- Chatsworth
- Citrusdal
- Clanwilliam
- Darling
- Doringbaai
- Dwarskersbos
- Ebenhaeser
- Eendekuil
- Elands Bay
- Goedverwacht
- Graafwater
- Grotto Bay
- Hopefield
- Jacobsbaai
- Jakkalsfontein
- Kalbaskraal
- Klawer
- Koekenaap
- Koringberg
- Lamberts Bay
- Langebaan
- Langebaanweg
- Lutzville
- Malmesbury
- Moorreesburg
- Paternoster
- Piketberg
- Porterville
- Redelinghuys
- Riebeek-Kasteel
- Riebeek West
- Saldanha
- St Helena Bay
- Strandfontein
- Vanrhynsdorp
- Velddrif
- Vredenburg
- Vredendal
- Wupperthal
- Yzerfontein

== Cape Winelands ==
The Cape Winelands District Municipality

- Ashton
- Bonnievale
- Ceres
- De Doorns
- De Hollandsche Molen
- Denneburg
- Franschhoek
- Gouda
- Kayamandi
- Klapmuts
- Kylemore
- Languedoc
- McGregor
- Montagu
- Op-die-Berg
- Paarl
- Pniel
- Prince Alfred Hamlet
- Rawsonville
- Robertson
- Robertsvlei
- Rozendal
- Saron
- Stellenbosch
- Touws River
- Tulbagh
- Wellington
- Wemmershoek
- Wolseley
- Worcester

== Overberg ==
The Overberg District Municipality

- Arniston
- Baardskeerdersbos
- Betty's Bay
- Birkenhead
- Botrivier
- Bredasdorp
- Caledon
- Dennehof
- De Kelders
- Elgin
- Elim
- Fisherhaven
- Franskraalstrand
- Gansbaai
- Genadendal
- Grabouw
- Greyton
- Hawston
- Hermanus
- Hotagterklip
- Infanta
- Kleinbaai
- Kleinmond
- Klipdale
- L'Agulhas
- Napier
- Onrusrivier
- Papiesvlei
- Pearly Beach
- Pringle Bay
- Riviersonderend
- Rooi Els
- Sandbaai
- Skipskop
- Stanford
- Struisbaai
- Suiderstrand
- Suurbraak
- Swellendam
- Uilenkraalsmond
- Van Dyksbaai
- Vermont
- Wolvengat
- Villiersdorp

== Garden Route ==
The Garden Route District Municipality (which encompasses the Garden Route and the Little Karoo)

- Avontuur
- Albertinia
- Amaliënstein
- Bergplaas
- Boggomsbaai
- Bracken Hill
- Brandwag
- Brenton-on-Sea
- Buffelsbaai
- Calitzdorp
- Dana Baai
- De Hoop
- De Rust
- De Vlugt
- Dysselsdorp
- Farleigh
- Friemersheim
- George
- Glentana
- Gouna
- Gouritsmond
- Great Brak River
- Groot-Jongensfontein
- Harkerville
- Haarlem
- Hartenbos
- Heidelberg
- Herbertsdale
- Herold
- Herolds Bay
- Hoekwil
- Jonkersberg
- Karatara
- Keurboomsrivier
- Keurboomstrand
- Knysna
- Kranshoek
- Kurland Estate
- Ladismith
- Little Brak River
- Matjiesrivier
- Mossel Bay
- Nature's Valley
- Noetzie
- Oudtshoorn
- Pacaltsdorp
- Plettenberg Bay
- Port Beaufort
- Puntjie
- Rheenendal
- Riversdale
- Ruiterbos
- Schoemanshoek
- Sedgefield
- Slangrivier
- Stilbaai
- Touwsranten
- Twee Rivieren
- Uniondale
- Vanwyksdorp
- Vermaaklikheid
- Volmoed
- Victoria Bay
- Vleesbaai
- Wilderness
- Wittedrift
- Witsand
- Woodville
- Zoar

== Klein Karoo ==
The Garden Route District Municipality (which encompasses the Garden Route and the Little Karoo)

- Montagu
- Barrydale
- Ladismith
- Calitzdorp
- Oudtshoorn
- De Rust

== Central Karoo ==
The Central Karoo District Municipality

- Beaufort West
- Laingsburg
- Leeu-Gamka
- Matjiesfontein
- Merweville
- Murraysburg
- Nelspoort
- Prince Albert
