= Gouna, South Africa =

Gouna
- Coordinates: 33°58′09″S 23°03′11″E
- Country: South Africa
- Province: Western Cape
- District: Garden Route
- Municipality: Knysna
- First settled by Europeans: 1881

Population
  - Total: 629

Racial Makeup (2011)
  - White: 56.3%
  - Coloured: 28.8%
  - Black African: 12.6%
  - Others: 2.4%

First Languages (2011)
  - Afrikaans: 49.6%
  - English: 34.5%
  - Xhosa: 10.3%
  - Others: 5.6%

Gouna is a village in the Western Cape in South Africa. The village lies about 6 km north of Knysna, 11 km east of Rheenendal and about 12 km northwest of Bracken Hill. Located in the Knysna forests, the village lies on a hill that forms part of the Outeniqua Mountains.

Near the village, lies the Gouna Pass, which is formed by Kom se Pad through the Outeniqua Mountains.

In the 2011 South African census the village and sïurrounding area had a population of 629 people living in 229 households.

== History ==
The village lies about 11 km south of the historic gold rush town of Millwood.

=== The Silk Spinners of Gouna ===
The Cape Colonial government funded thirty two silk spinners to move to the Colony during the late 19th Century with the purpose of creating a silk industry in the Knysna Forests.

The immigrants wanted to leave behind violence and instability in their city of origin, Treviso, northern Italy, in search of a new start in a country that offered them new homes, mulberry trees for their silkworms, and sheds to spin their silk.

On the 3rd of May, 1881, a group consisting of three families and a few single men reached Knysna by boat. Following a three-week journey by ox-cart from the port to the Gouna Forest, they arrived to discover just a handful of tents - and no mulberry trees - set up for them.

Local residents who had urged the government to support the initiative did not understand that the native mulberry (Trimeria grandiflora) is different from the white mulberry (Morus Alba) from China, which is vital for the survival of the silkworm.

The group was given government rations briefly, then they were assigned pieces of land to farm, which they failed at. A few men went to seek employment on the highways, while others started cutting wood for income.

=== San Ambroso Church ===
San Ambroso, a Catholic Church in Gouna, is among the oldest buildings in the area. The construction of the church took place a decade following the group's establishment. The purpose of its design was to bring back memories of the settlers' lives in the Italian foothills and to help them feel more connected to their home and religion.

The church was dedicated in 1891 by Reverend Rooney based in George.

The title 'San Ambroso Chapel Museum' was chosen following the renovation of the structure in 2005. Rayno Sciocatti, a direct ancestor of Gouna's original silk spinners, conducted the restoration.
