= Millwood, South Africa =

Millwood
- Ghost Town
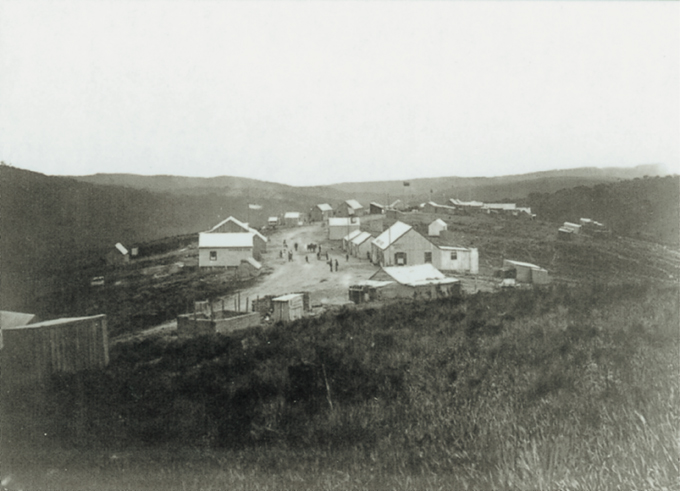
- The town around 1880

- Location within Western Cape Location within South Africa Location within Africa
- Coordinates: 33°52′57″S 23°00′05″E
- Country: South Africa
- Province: Western Cape
- District: Garden Route
- Municipality: Knysna
- First Gold Discovered: 1876
- Abandoned: 1890

Millwood in South Africa was the site of a short-lived gold rush in the 1880s. Millwood Mining Village was located in the foothills of the Outeniqua Mountains near Knysna and had a population of a few hundred at the height of its small-scale mining activity which lasted only five years, largely due to the difficulty of following the vein in much-folded formations.

In 1876 a certain James Hooper discovered what he thought was gold-bearing gravel in a small creek off the Karatara River on the farm 'Ruigtevlei' near Rheenendal, and his suspicions were confirmed by the town chemist, William Groom. The creek was later named 'Jubilee Creek' to commemorate Queen Victoria's Jubilee. Charles Osborne, an engineer working on the road from George to Knysna, was granted £100 by the Cape Government to prospect for gold in the area. He started at a sawmill run by the Thesen family, whence the name of 'Woodmill', but was unsuccessful. He was transferred to Port Nolloth and returned to the Woodmill area later. In the meantime various people such as Thomas Kitto and E. J. Dunn, the Cape Government Geologist, discovered alluvial gold in the area and reported favourably on mining prospects in 1880. In 1886 the area was declared open as "public diggings", John Barrington (son of Henry Barrington) being appointed as its first Gold Commissioner. Osborne returned and prospected in the catchment area of the Homtini River, finding a promising reef in 1886. With Thomas Bain, the famed pass-builder, he compiled an unfavourable report and tried to discourage any gold rush. Even so, some two thousand reef and alluvial claims were pegged in what became known as the 'Millwood Gold Fields'.

The news spread quickly, luring fortune-seekers from as far afield as the United Kingdom, California and Australia, and within weeks a village of 135 stands, hotels, boarding houses, general stores, a post office, police barracks and a hospital had been erected. A weekly mail service was started between Knysna and Millwood, and this quickly became thrice weekly. The 'Bendigo Gold Mine' was one of a number which sprang up near the village. In December 1887 the 'Oudtshoorn Company' started using a large crushing plant. A mere 656 ozs of gold were recovered in the first year of mining operations, some of the gold being in the form of large nuggets. By December 1890 virtually all the mining companies had collapsed.

Old mining equipment and items relating to the Millwood gold rush were recovered and restored, and are on view at Monk's Store or the Materolli Museum (a corruption of 'Mother Holly'), a walk of about 5.5km from the remains of the mines, the ghost town, and its cemetery.

Millwood House originally stood in the Millwood Goldfields but was later moved to Knysna

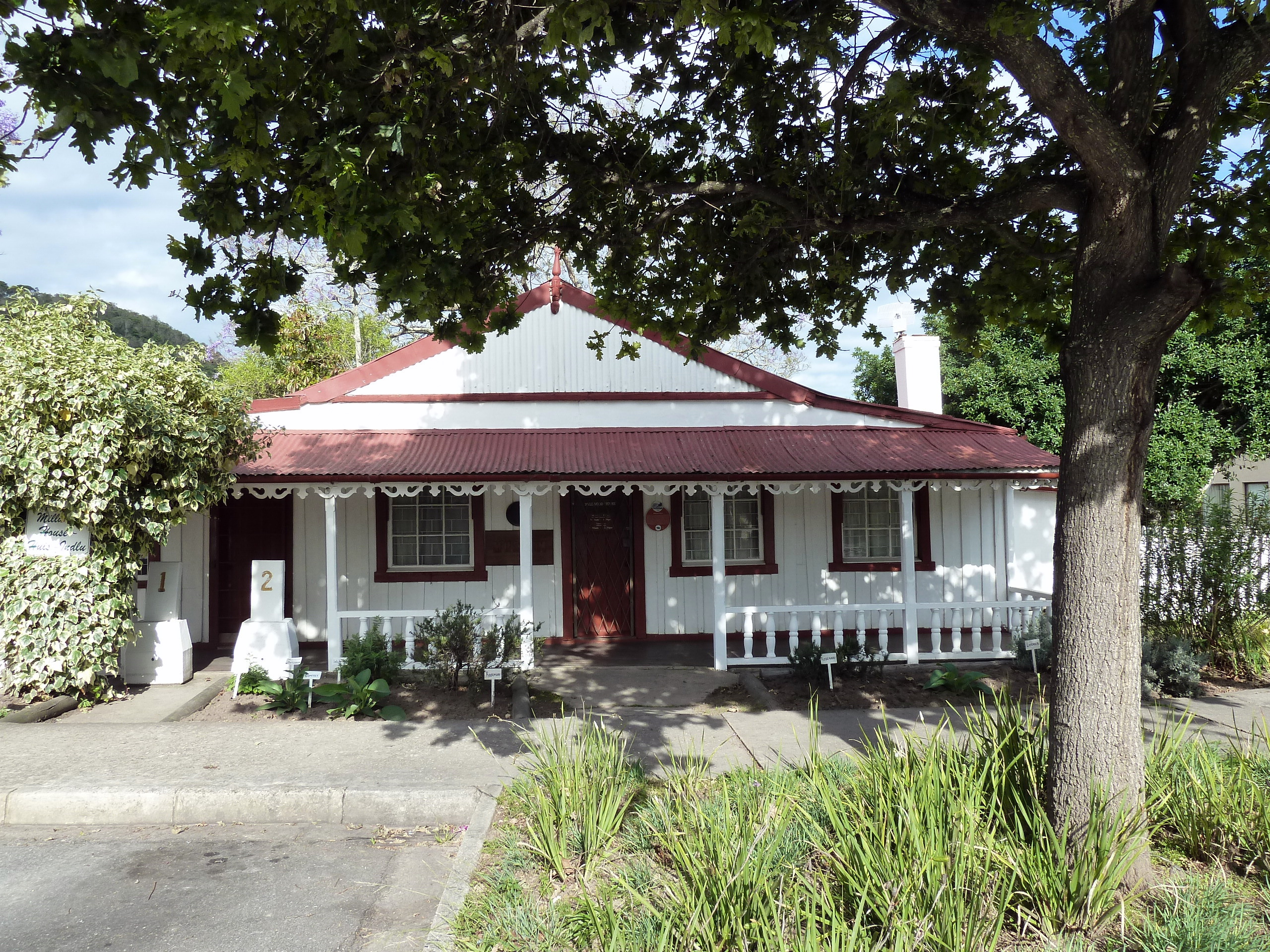
Millwood House
