= Farleigh, Western Cape =

Farleigh
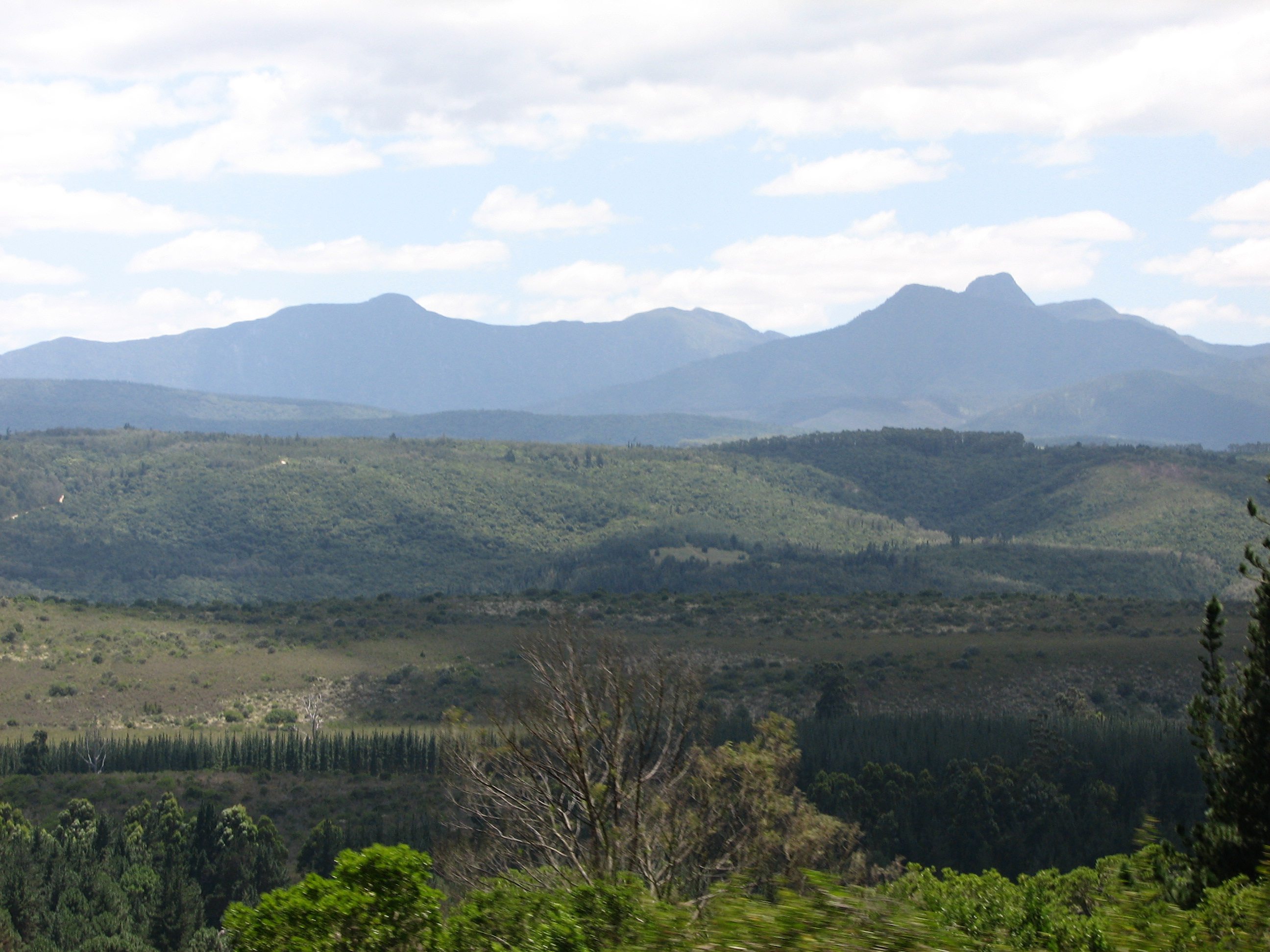
- The Outeniqua Mountains, on which the settlement lies.

- Location within Western Cape Location within South Africa
- Coordinates: 33°54′03″S 22°51′49″E
- Country: South Africa
- Province: Western Cape
- District: Garden Route
- Municipality: Knysna

Population (2011)
  - Total: 1,057

Racial Makeup (2011)
  - Coloured: 70.9%
  - White: 19.1%
  - Black African: 8.5%
  - Others: 1.5%

First Languages (2011)
  - Afrikaans: 77.5%
  - English: 15.7%
  - Xhosa: 5.1%
  - Others: 1.7%

Farleigh is a small town in the Western Cape province of South Africa. The settlement is also a forestry station. Farleigh is 3 km northeast of Karatara and 8 km northwest of Rheenendal, with the closest major town being Knysna. The town is about 511 metres above sea level.

In the 2011 South African census, the local population was counted as 1,057 people living in 249 households.
