= Puntjie =

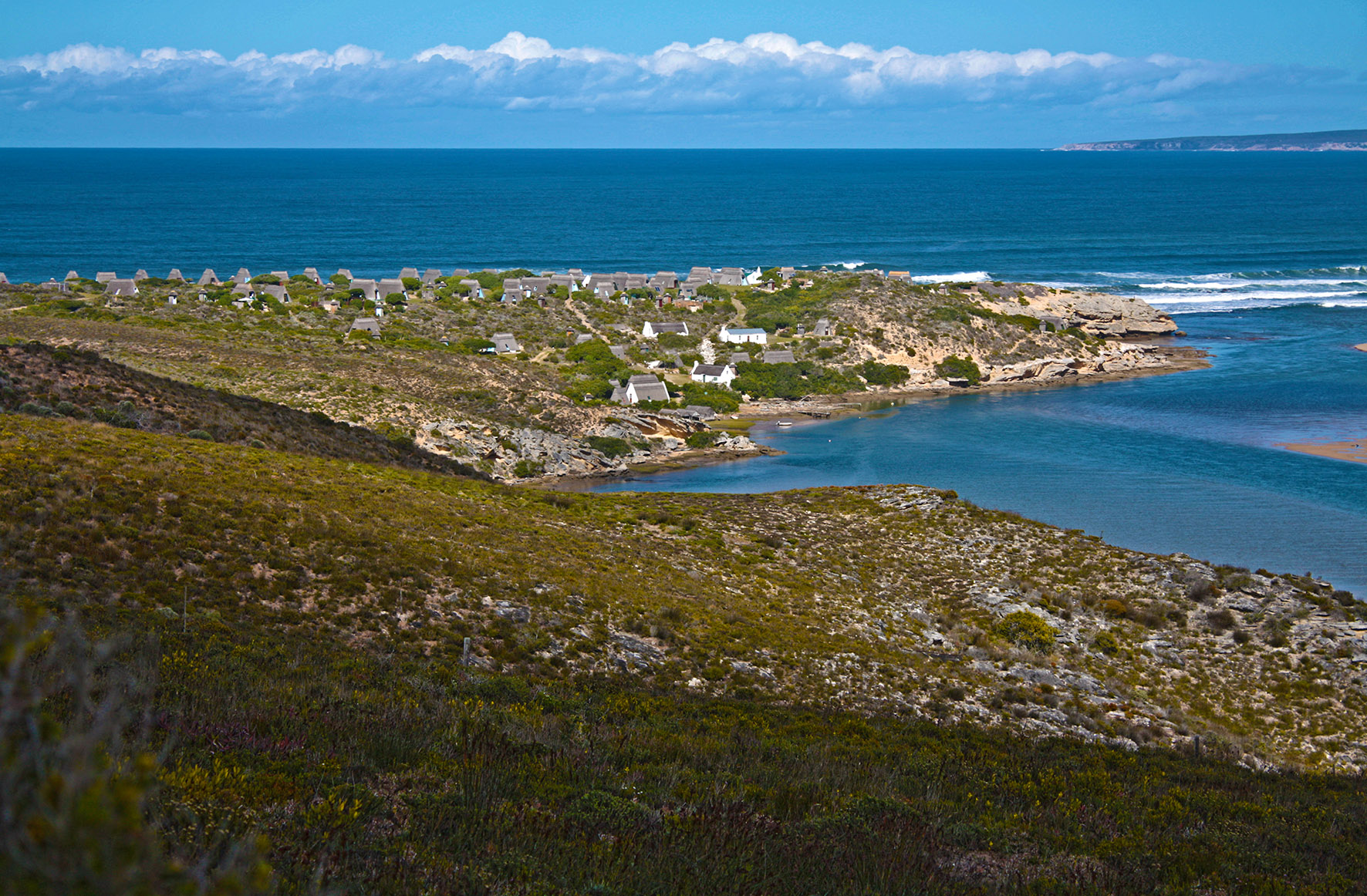
- View of Puntjie

- Location within Western Cape Location within South Africa
- Coordinates: 34°21′54″S 21°00′22″E
- Country: South Africa
- Province: Western Cape
- District: Garden Route
- Municipality: Hessequa

Population
  - Total: 356

Puntjie (literally meaning "Little Point") is a small town in the Western Cape of South Africa. The town lies at the St. Sebastiaan Bay and on the eastern shore of the Duivenhoks Rivier's mouth.

This holiday village is known for its hut style houses. It can be reached by a dirt road from Riversdale. However, this resort is privately owned. The town lies about 6 km south of Vermaaklikheid and about 15 km east of Witsand.

In the 2011 South African census the population of the town and surrounding areas was 356 people living in 99 households.

== Bibliography ==
- Lantern, vintage 11, no. 1, July 1961.
