= Hoekwil =

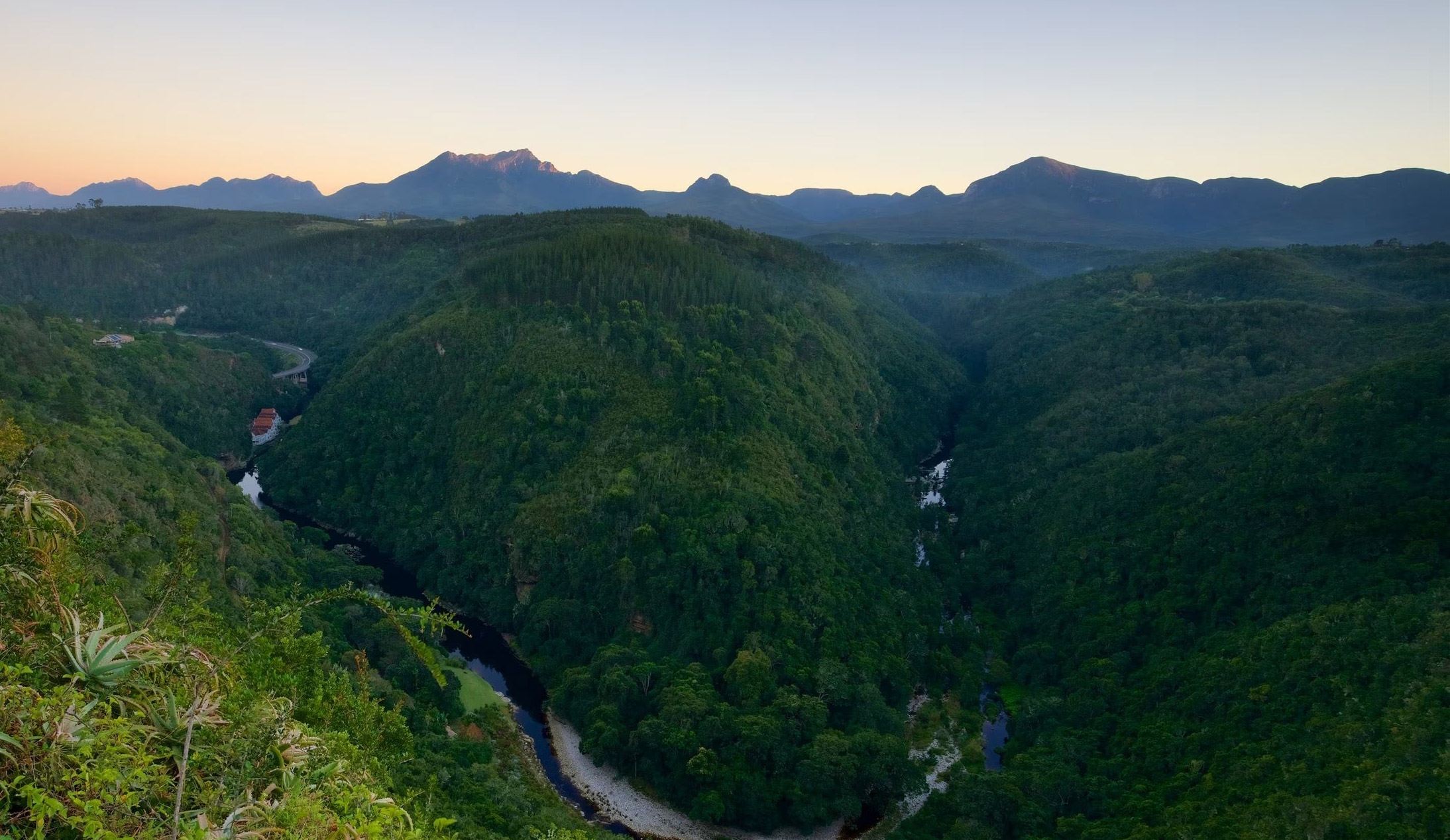
- Hoekwil

- Location within Western Cape Location within South Africa
- Coordinates: 33.980°S 22.585°E
- Country: South Africa
- Province: Western Cape
- District: Garden Route
- Municipality: George
- Main Place: Wilderness

Area
  - Total: 21.97 km^{2} (8.48 sq mi)

Population (2011)
  - Total: 3,787
  - Density: 172.4/km^{2} (446.4/sq mi)

Racial makeup (2011)
  - Black African: 12.8%
  - Coloured: 63.1%
  - Indian/Asian: 0.2%
  - White: 21.9%
  - Other: 2.1%

First languages (2011)
  - Afrikaans: 78.8%
  - English: 12.6%
  - Xhosa: 6.4%
  - Other: 2.2%
- Time zone: UTC+2 (SAST)
- PO box: 6538

Hoekwil is a town in Garden Route District Municipality in the Western Cape province of South Africa. It is a mountain-top village connected to the coastal village of Wilderness via the Hoekwil Pass, a well-designed, tarred road that serves both the village of Hoekwil and local forestry areas and farms. Nearby settlements include Woodville, George and Karatara.

== History ==
At the end of the nineteenth century, many Afrikaners in South Africa suffered. Due to several reasons, they were caught in the grip of poverty and isolation. Subsistence farming, fishing in the lakes area and the harvesting of the indigenous wood were their main sources of income. As in many other parts of South Africa, the Church was deeply concerned about the precarious living conditions of the people. The combined interventions of the Dutch Reformed Church and the State was unavoidable.

It was during that time (1912-1923), that ds. Jan Andries Beyers actively took the lead to change and improve the lives of many people, not only those from the lakes area. The establishment of a church settlement at Olifantshoek where about 25 families were accommodated, is a monument of his love and commitment towards the poorest of the poor of his people.

It can therefore categorically be said that ds. Beyers was the founder of Hoekwil. His vision for the future and desire of a century ago was to equip a generation out of the disadvantaged sections of his congregation with education, so that their future won’t be hampered by concerns, but that they will be able to tackle it with confidence and faith.

Originally Olifantshoek consisted mainly of a portion that was designated on the maps as the State-owned Olifantshoek Plantations. Transfer thereof to the Church by the sympathetic Union Government for this essential and deserving case was therefore just a formality.

Few places in South Africa can boast three relevant names:

- Olifantshoek
- Hoekwil
- Olifantshoogte

== Origin of the name ==
Presently there are still various explanations for the origin of the name “Hoekwil”. One is a combination of the last syllable of Olifantshoek with the first syllable of Wilderness to form Hoekwil

== Development ==
Throughout the years there has been a lot of development and now, after 100 years, the little village of Hoekwil is significantly different. It started off with schools being established by the church; water supply from the Divisional council replaced the old furrow system from the mountains; the railway line was built and gradually the ox wagon disappeared from the scene and large plantations were established. In 1982 electricity eventually came to Hoekwil – all this contributed to the material welfare of Hoekwil.

== The Hoekwil Pass ==
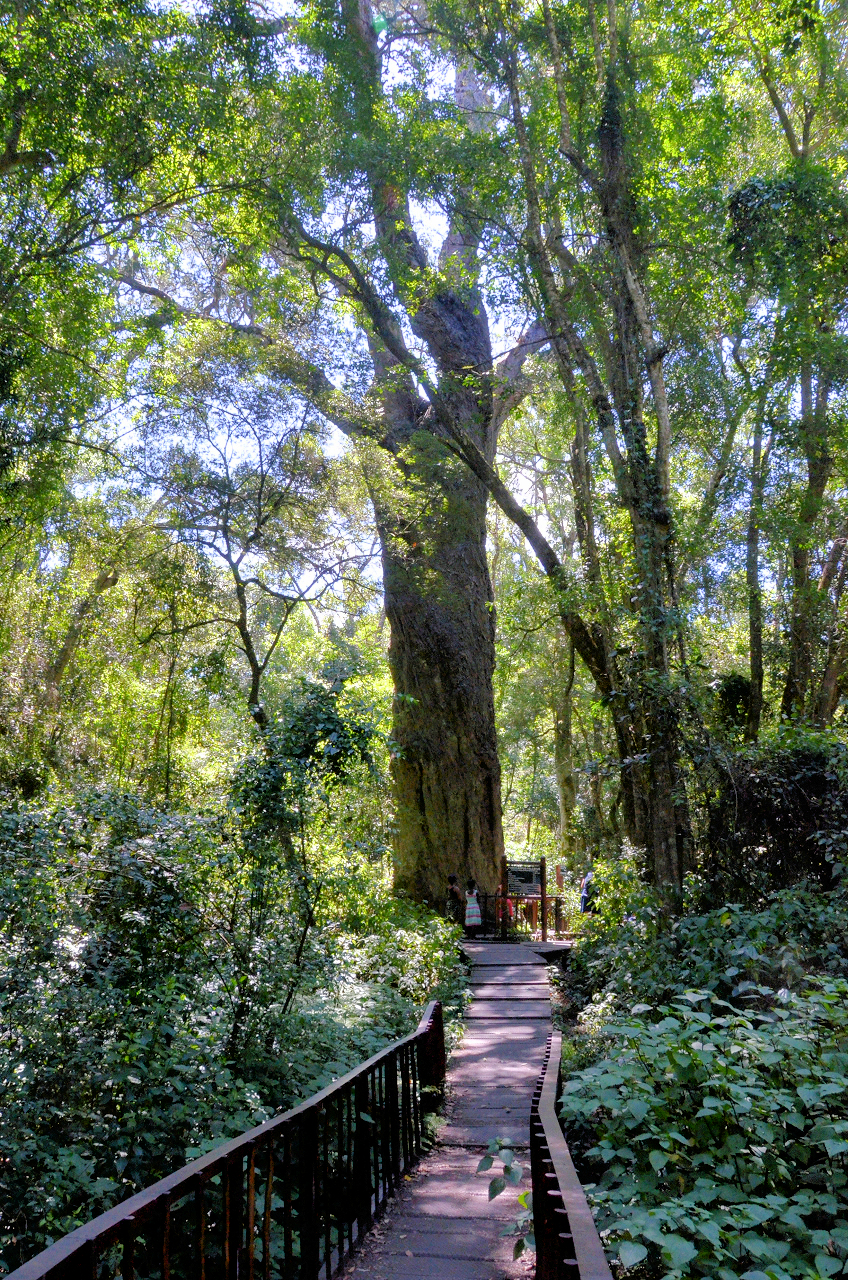
Woodville Big Tree

The Hoekwil Pass is a short, steep pass connecting the mountain-top village of Hoekwil with the coastal village of Wilderness. Views from the pass are quite magical, revealing first the blue waters of the Indian Ocean at Wilderness with its surf-washed white beach, then the valley filled with rivers and lakes. The road has no safety shoulders, so cyclists need to be extra careful along this pass.
