= Bergplaas =

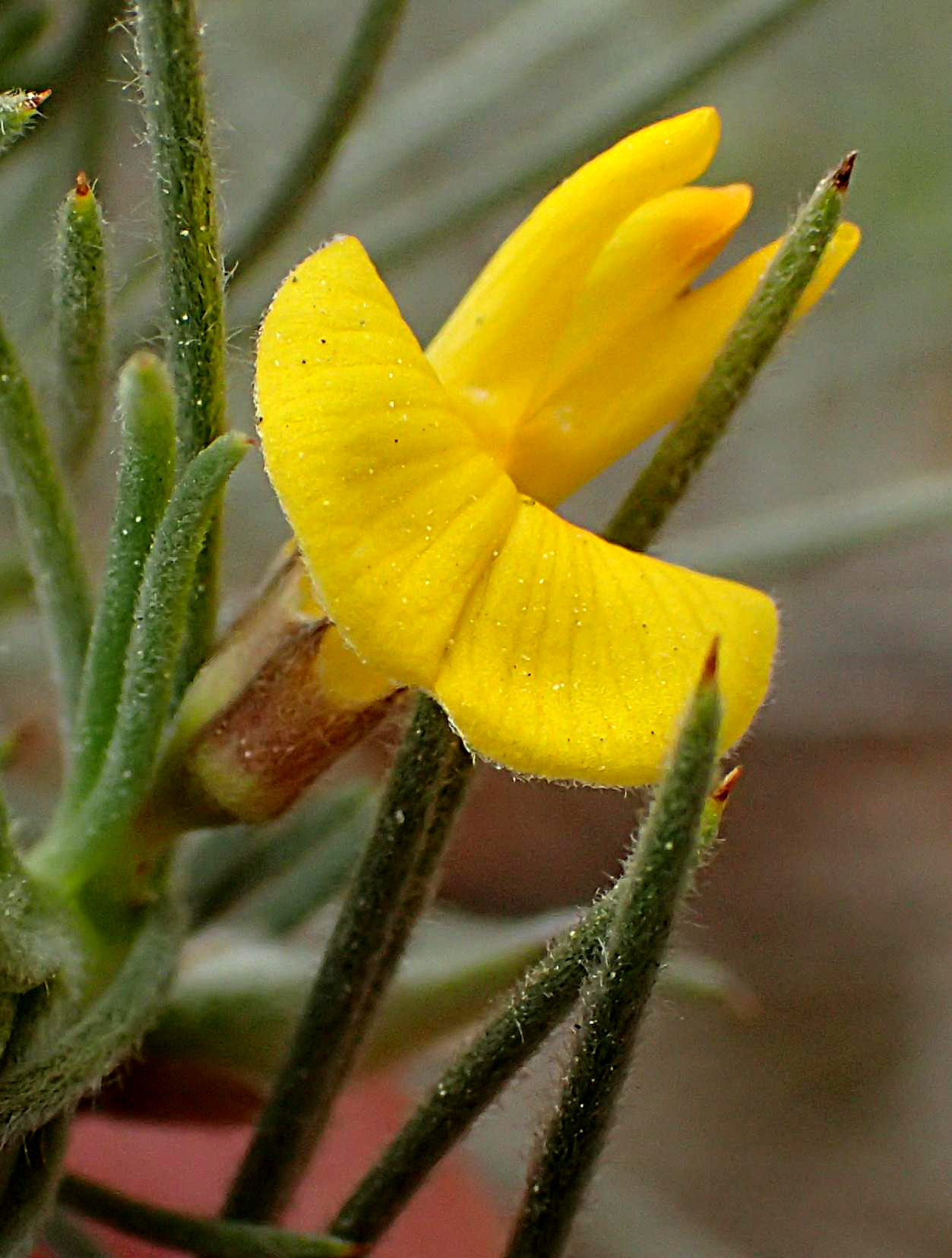
- Vegetation near Bergplaas.

- Location within Western Cape Location within South Africa
- Coordinates: 33°54′00″S 22°40′22″E
- Country: South Africa
- Province: Western Cape
- District: Garden Route
- Municipality: George

Bergplaas is a small village in the Western Cape province of South Africa. Situated near Voortrekker Pass the Outeniqua Mountains, it is surrounded by the Bergplaas State Forest. The settlement is about 4 km north of Woodville, with the nearest city being George, 18 km southwest of the village.

In the 2011 South African census, the local population was 253 people living in 57 households.
