= Victoria Bay =

Victoria Bay Victoriabaai
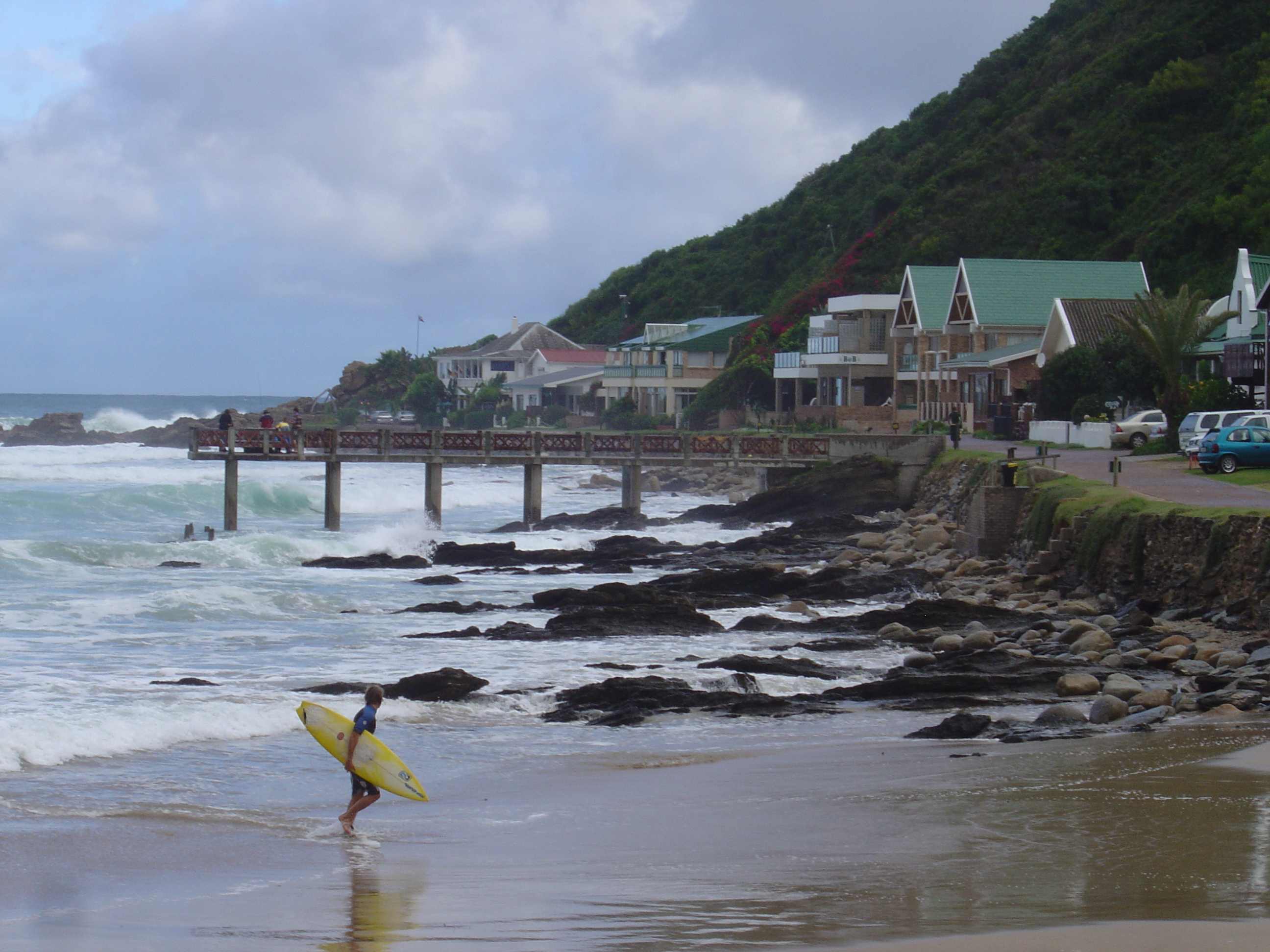
- Victoria Bay

- Location within Western Cape Location within South Africa
- Coordinates: 34°00′S 22°33′E
- Country: South Africa
- Province: Western Cape
- District: Garden Route
- Municipality: George
- Time zone: UTC+2 (SAST)

Victoria Bay is a small cove in the Western Cape, South Africa, situated on the Garden Route between George and Wilderness. It is a popular beach for surfers, consisting of a right hand reef-like wave which rolls over small boulder-like rocks for about 200m. A 2019 article described Vic Bay (as it is locally known) as being "well known as the best right hand point break in the Southern Cape". District and National surf competitions are often held at Vic Bay and despite its small size, Vic Bay is a well-known and much-visited spot.

It is also extremely popular with swimmers who are able to swim in demarcated beach areas or in the tidal pool at the beach.

== History ==
The town was formerly known as Gunter Bay, but was later renamed Victoria Bay in 1847 in honor of Queen Victoria.

In 1858, Captain Pilkington surveyed the bay for harbour purposes.

Bramwell Butler, a young bookkeeper, built the jetty, tidal pool and harbour wall after winning the Calcutta Sweepstake in 1923. He also bought land that today would extend from Sea Cottage to Land's End B&B.

== Geography ==
The western side of the bay culminates in large boulders believed to have rolled down from the top of the hill. This area is known as Land's End, the name given to the original bungalow at the end of the then-dirt road. The Land's End bungalow is now a large self-catering and B&B property, as are most of the thirteen properties along the road.

The eastern side of the bay consists of rocks, flanked briefly by a concrete wall built to prevent erosion of the slope. There is a small cave often used by fishermen as shelter. The end of the eastern side is known as Kabeljou Bank, named after the large Cob which are often line-caught from the rocks.

== Marine Life ==
Visitors and residents of Victoria Bay are able to view an array of marine life including dolphins and whales as well as a host of smaller marine life in the rock pools. Southern Right Whales are often viewed between June and November and Humpback Whales from May to November.

== Tourism ==
A number of camp sites overlook the bay and clusters of holiday chalets are situated nearby, making it a popular holiday destination during the summer and Easter holiday periods. The grassy area above the beach has braai facilities and a small shop and restaurant are situated at the top of the beach road.

Running above the Bay is the railway line joining George, Wilderness, Sedgefield and ultimately Knysna. The famous Outeniqua Choo Tjoe operated popular tourist rides along this route, although following operational difficulties and severe flood damage to the tracks above Vic Bay during the 2006 storms, its future remained uncertain. A tender to repair and rejuvenate the track was however awarded in 2024, according to the Garden Route Municipality, which says that "negotiations are underway" to begin the process of doing so.

A concrete jetty, flanked by a sandy-bottomed rock pool, looks out across the bay and is a popular place for watching the surfers and for fishing. The original jetty, built by Butler, was severely damaged during storms and was replaced by a larger one during the early 1990s.

== Notable people ==
- Bianca Buitendag, Olympic surfer, credited her foundation in surfing partly to her youth in Vic Bay in an interview: "When I was thirteen years old, my family moved four hours up the coast to a little village called Victoria Bay. It is one of the most consistent and wonderful waves in South Africa, a long running right hand point break with very few people out. It has nice sections and is a rippable wave," she said.
