= Portland Manor, Knysna =

Portland Manor
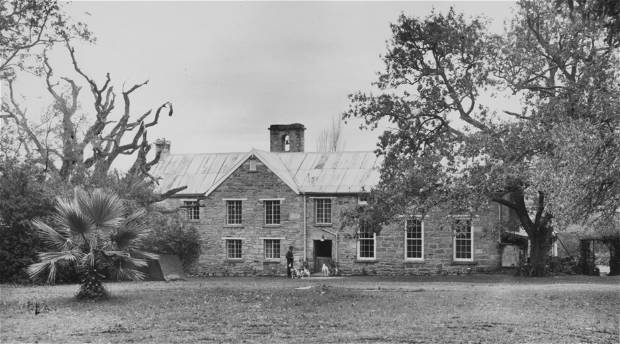
- The building in earlier years

General information
- Architectural style: Georgian
- Coordinates: 33°57′40″S 22°59′20″E
- Year(s) built: 1863
- Renovated: 1870
- Destroyed: 1869

Website
- https://www.portlandmanor.co.za/

Portland Manor is a manor house near Rheenendal in the Western Cape, South Africa. The building was originally constructed in 1863 by Sir Henry Barrington. Situated at the foothills of the Outeniqua Mountains, the estate is surrounded by lush greenery and forests. Portland Manor is set on 212 acres of land and is about 10 km northwest of Knysna.

== History ==
In 1772, the farm 'Melkhoutkraal' was granted to Stephanus Josias Terblanche. In 1774, the brother of Stephanus, Salomon Terblanche, was granted the farm 'Leeuwenbosch', where the Portland Estate stands on today.

In 1819, George Rex, purchased a portion of Leeuwenbosch, known as 'De Poort', and renamed it to 'Portland'.

By 1840, Captain Thomas Henry Duthie had purchased two additional farms from his father-in-law (George Rex), namely Westford and Portland.

In 1842, Sir Henry Barrington bought Portland from Duthie, setting out to build a lavish country home, which only happened later in 1863.

In 1869, most of the building was destroyed in the Great fire of 1869. Reconstruction of the house started in 1870.
