= Twee Rivieren =

- Location within Western Cape Location within South Africa
- Coordinates: 33.952°S 22.479°E
- Country: South Africa
- Province: Western Cape
- District: Garden Route
- Municipality: George
- Main Place: George, Western Cape

Area
  - Total: 0.23 km^{2} (0.089 sq mi)

Population (2011)
  - Total: 376
  - Density: 1,600/km^{2} (4,200/sq mi)

Racial makeup (2011)
  - Black African: 2.4%
  - Coloured: 5.3%
  - White: 90.7%
  - Other: 1.6%

First languages (2011)
  - Afrikaans: 72.5%
  - English: 25.1%
  - Other: 2.4%
- Time zone: UTC+2 (SAST)
- Postal code (street): 6529

Twee Rivieren is a small residential suburb in George, South Africa. It is located in the northern area of the city between Denneoord to the north and Bo-dorp to the south. "Twee Rivieren" is a Dutch name, meaning "Two Rivers". Its name is derived from its location, nestled between two branches of the Kat River.

The suburb of Twee Rivieren, George, is home to two prominent churches, the Dutch Reformed Church "Moedergemeente", as well as the only Greek Orthodox Church in George, where services are still conducted in Greek.

A popular attraction in this suburb is the decoration of Oewer Street over the Christmas period. This has become an annual event since 2005 and has attracted many visitors who come to view the festive decorations and lights between Christmas and new year.
