= Woodville, Western Cape =

Woodville
- Hamlet
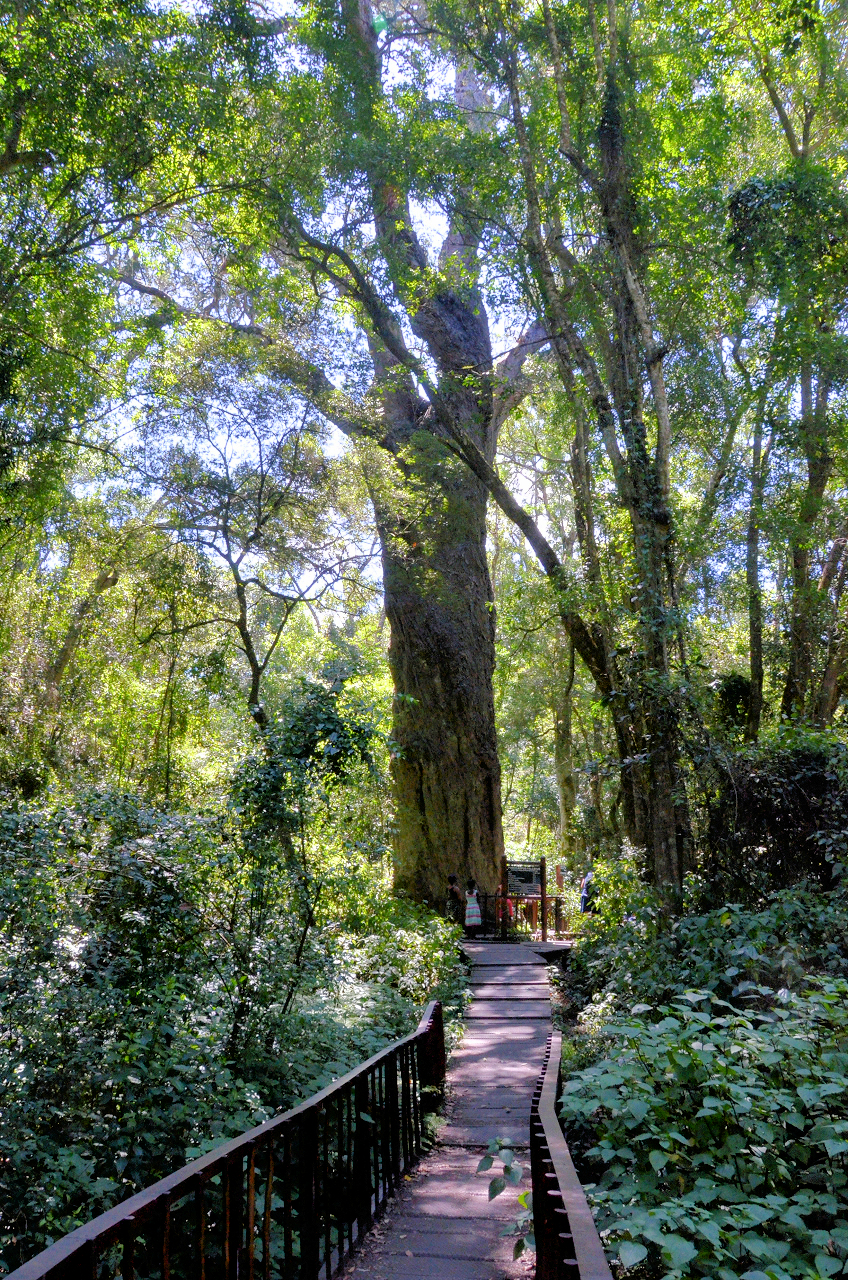
- Woodville Big Tree

- Location within Western Cape Location within South Africa
- Coordinates: 33°56′11″S 22°40′09″E
- Country: South Africa
- Province: Western Cape
- District: Garden Route
- Municipality: George

Population (2011)
  - Total: 431

Racial Makeup (2011)
  - White: 58.9%
  - Coloured: 22.7%
  - Black African: 17.4%

First Languages (2011)
  - Afrikaans: 61.3%
  - English: 29.5%
  - Sesotho: 3.9%
  - Xhosa: 3.0%

Woodville is a small hamlet in the Western Cape, South Africa. The settlement is located about 15 km west of Karatara and about 17 km east of George, with the closest town being Touwsranten located 5 km east. Woodville lies at the foot of the Outeniqua Mountains and is about 2 km east of the Woodville Big Tree, the third largest in South Africa.

In the 2011 South African census the local population was 431 people living in 145 households.

The settlement is home to the historic Wayside Inn.
