= Bracken Hill =

- Coordinates: 34°01′40″S 23°10′10″E
- Country: South Africa
- Province: Western Cape
- District: Garden Route
- Municipality: Knysna

Population
  - Total: 189

Bracken Hill is a small village near Knysna in the Western Cape Province in South Africa.

In the 2011 South African Census the town had a population of 189 people living in 33 households.

Near the town lies the Brackenhill Waterfall.

== History ==
Thesen & Co. established a sawmill station and wagon component works in Brackenhill which existed until 1924, after which it was moved to Paarden Eiland in Cape Town.
