= Harkerville =

- Location within Western Cape Location within South Africa
- Coordinates: 34.033°S 23.233°E
- Country: South Africa
- Province: Western Cape
- District: Garden Route
- Municipality: Bitou

Area
  - Total: 43.61 km^{2} (16.84 sq mi)

Population (2001)
  - Total: 269
  - Density: 6.17/km^{2} (16.0/sq mi)

Racial makeup (2001)
  - Black African: 5.6%
  - Coloured: 77.7%
  - White: 16.7%

First languages (2001)
  - Afrikaans: 86.6%
  - English: 13.4%
- Time zone: UTC+2 (SAST)
- PO box: 6604

Harkerville is a settlement in Garden Route District Municipality in the Western Cape province of South Africa.
