= Papiesvlei =

- Coordinates: 34°29′00″S 19°35′00″E
- Country: South Africa
- Province: Western Cape
- District: Overberg
- Municipality: Overstrand

Papiesvlei is a small dispersed village in the Western Cape province of South Africa. The settlement lies in the Strandveld region, 14 km northeast of Uilenkraalsmond, 11 km north of Baardskeerdersbos and about 12 km southeast of Stanford.

The town's coordinates are 34°29'00"S 19°35'00"E.

In the 2011 South African census the settlement's population was recorded 980 people living in 379 households.
