= Matjiesrivier =

- Location within Western Cape Location within South Africa
- Coordinates: 33.399°S 22.035°E
- Country: South Africa
- Province: Western Cape
- District: Garden Route
- Municipality: Oudtshoorn
- Time zone: UTC+2 (SAST)
- PO box: 6634

Matjiesrivier is a town at the southern foot of the Waboomsberg, some 37 km south of Prince Albert, off the road to Oudtshoorn. Afrikaans for 'mat river', the reference is to a type of sedge (Cyperus textilis) growing there, used by Khoekhoen in making mats with which they made their huts. Matjiesgoed is the common name for this sedge, literally 'mat stuff.
