= Volmoed =

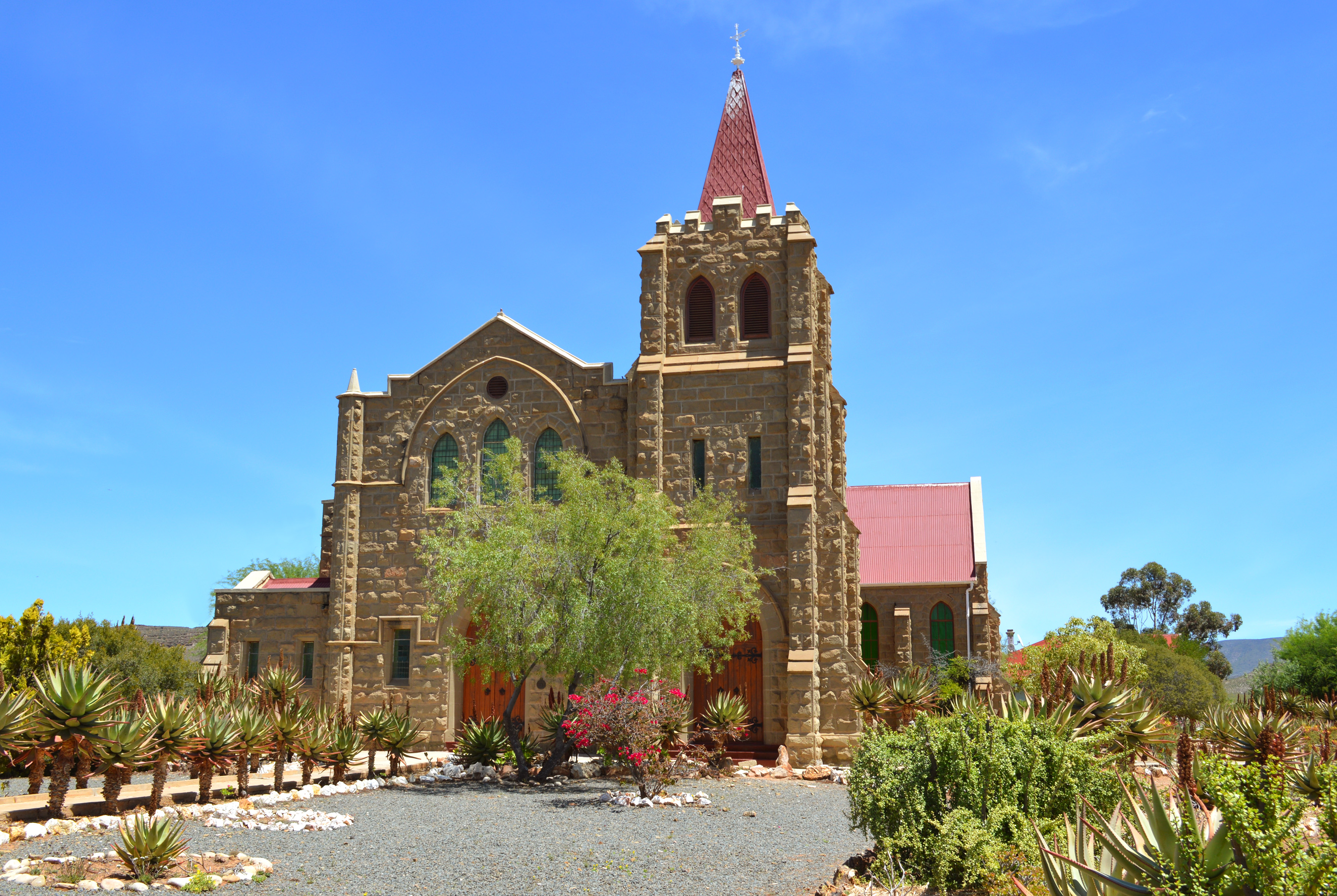
- Church in Volmoed

- Location within Western Cape Location within South Africa
- Coordinates: 33°39′S 22°05′E
- Country: South Africa
- Province: Western Cape
- District: Garden Route
- Municipality: Oudtshoorn

Area
  - Total: 2.29 km^{2} (0.88 sq mi)

Population (2001)
  - Total: 235
  - Density: 103/km^{2} (266/sq mi)

Racial makeup (2001)
  - Coloured: 86.0%
  - White: 14.0%

First languages (2001)
  - Afrikaans: 100%
- Time zone: UTC+2 (SAST)
- PO box: 6624

Volmoed is a settlement in Garden Route District Municipality in the Western Cape province of South Africa.

Volmoed is a small town in the Klein Karoo, about 15km from Oudtshoorn. It was formerly known as Armoed.
