= Jonkersberg =

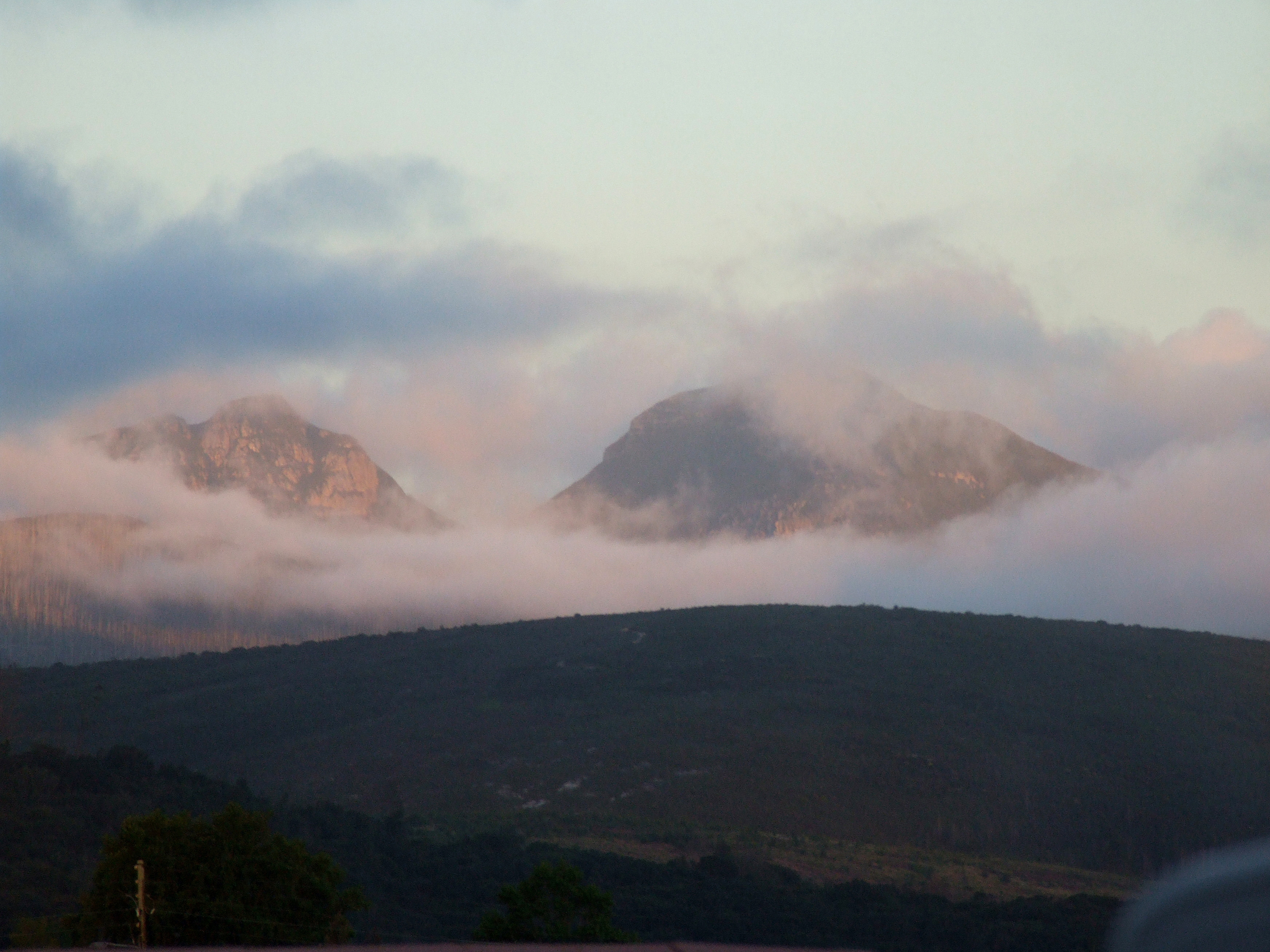
- The Outeniqua Mountains, on which the village lies.

- Location within Western Cape Location within South Africa
- Coordinates: 33°56′08″S 22°13′47″E
- Country: South Africa
- Province: Western Cape
- District: Garden Route
- Municipality: Mossel Bay
- First Settled: 1916

Population
  - Total: 114

Jonkersberg is a small village and forestry station in the Western Cape province of South Africa.

The village was established around 1916 when European woodcutters from Knysna were resettled in Jonkersberg, as well as Franschhoek.

Jonkersberg lies at the foothills of the Outeniqua Mountains.

In the 2011 South African census the village's population was 114 people living in 24 households.
