= Schoemanshoek =

- Village
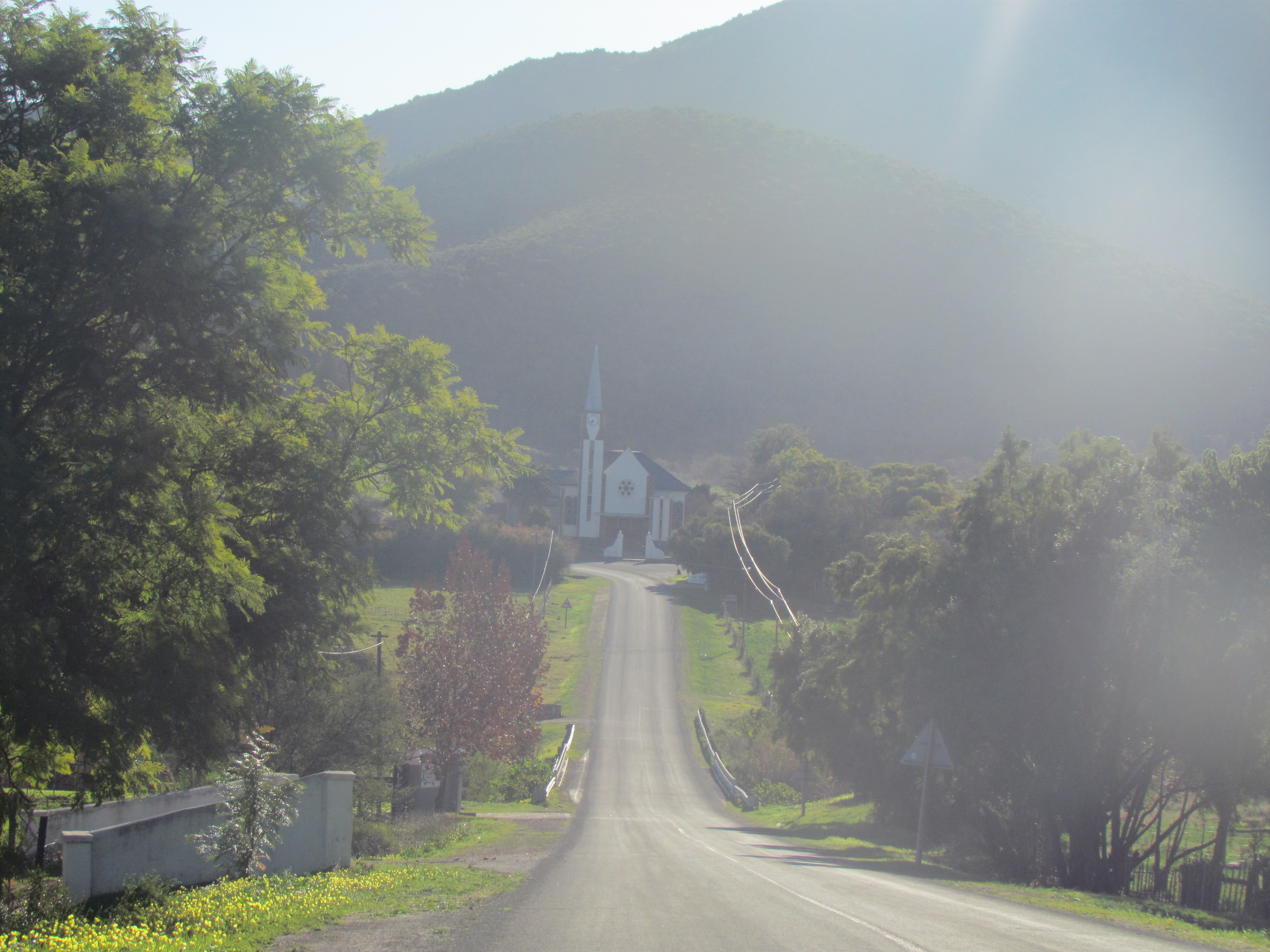
- The Dutch Reformed Church of Schoemanshoek

- Location within Western Cape Location within South Africa
- Coordinates: 33°29′0″S 22°14′0″E
- Country: South Africa
- Province: Western Cape
- District: Garden Route
- Municipality: Oudtshoorn

Population
  - Total: 2,043

Schoemanshoek (literally meaning "Schoeman's Corner") is a village on the R328 regional route between Oudtshoorn and the Swartberg in the Western Cape province of South Africa. The village lies on the Grobbelaars River in a valley where tobacco, alfalfa and soft fruit are grown.

The settlement is just south of Schoemanspoort on the same road.

In the 2011 South African census the population of the settlement and the surrounding areas was 2,043 people living in 391 households.
