= Touwsranten =

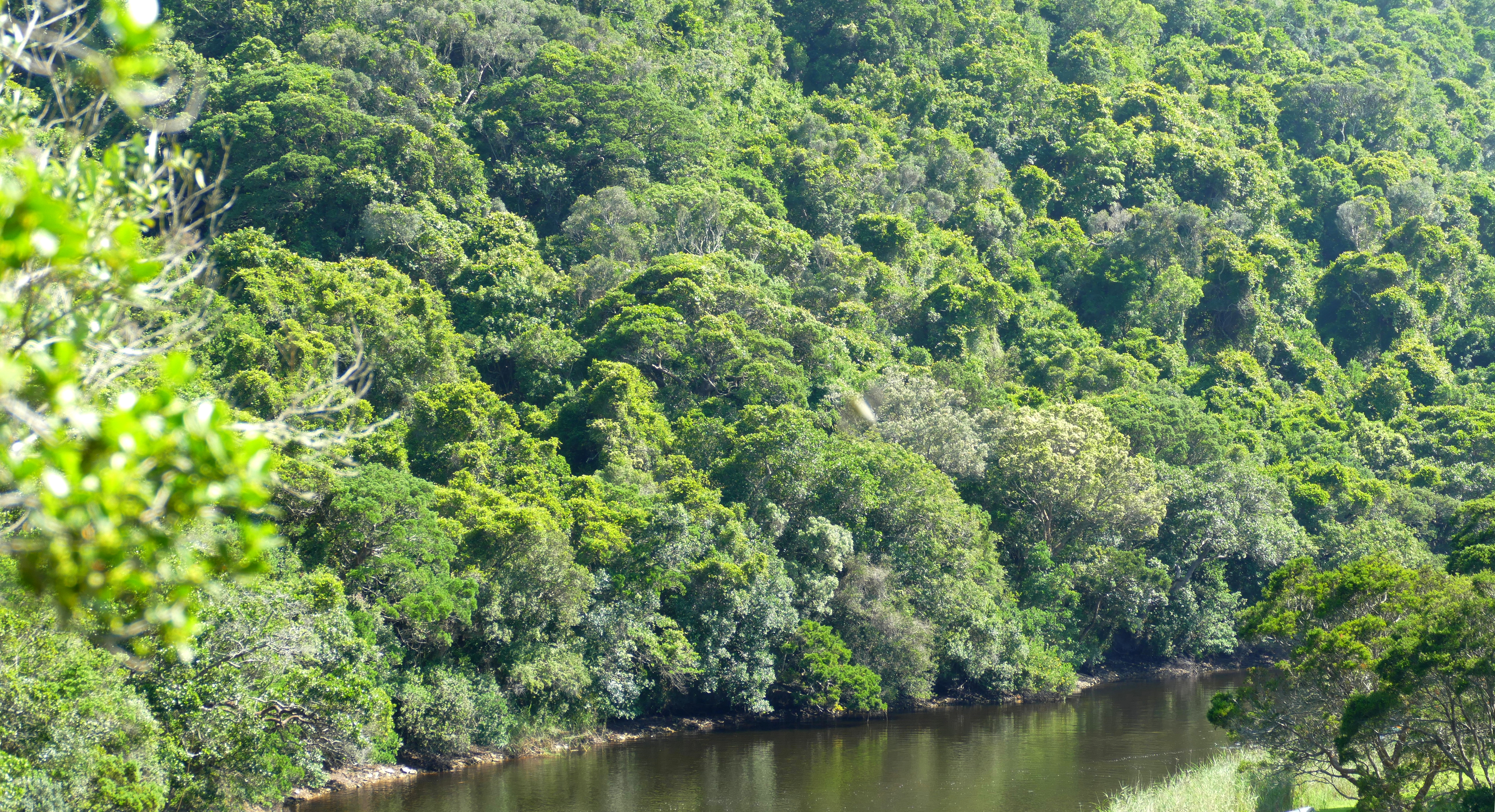
- The Touws River near Touwsranten

- Location within Western Cape Location within South Africa
- Coordinates: 33°57′09″S 22°37′17″E
- Country: South Africa
- Province: Western Cape
- District: Garden Route
- Municipality: George

Touwsranten is a small town in the Western Cape in South Africa. The village lies near the banks of the Touws River and gets its name from there, with Touwsranten meaning "Touws edge" in Dutch.

In the 2011 South African census the town had a population of 415 people living in 129 households.
