= Haarlem, South Africa =

Haarlem
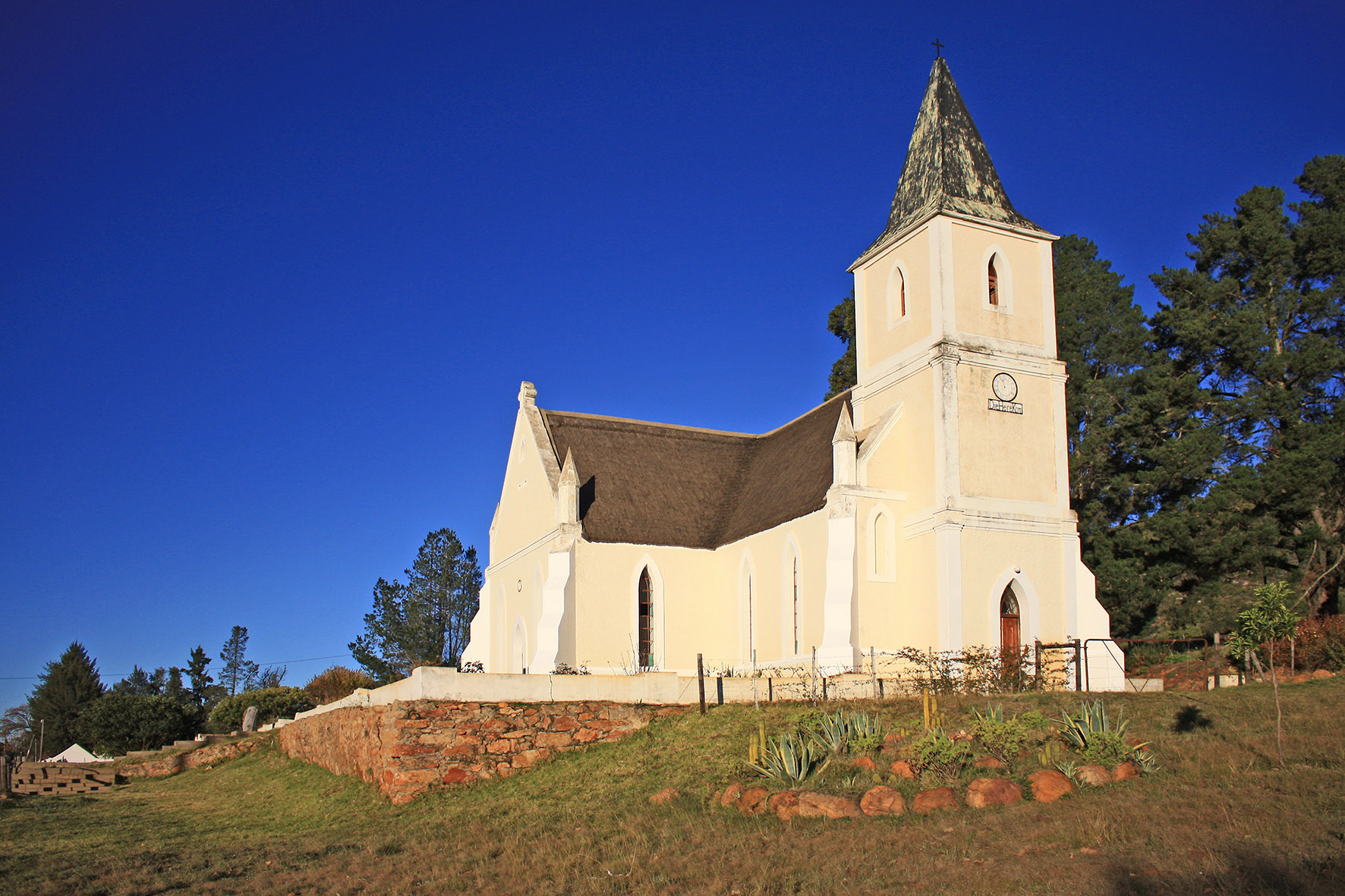
- Evangelical Lutheran Church, Haarlem

- Location within Western Cape Location within South Africa
- Coordinates: 33°44′02″S 23°20′19″E
- Country: South Africa
- Province: Western Cape
- District: Garden Route
- Municipality: George

Area
  - Total: 9.04 km^{2} (3.49 sq mi)

Population (2011)
  - Total: 2,376
  - Density: 263/km^{2} (681/sq mi)

Racial makeup (2011)
  - Black African: 4.2%
  - Coloured: 94.1%
  - White: 0.9%
  - Other: 0.8%

First languages (2011)
  - Afrikaans: 97.6%
  - English: 1.3%
  - Other: 1.1%
- Time zone: UTC+2 (SAST)
- PO box: 6467
- Area code: 044

Haarlem is a settlement in Garden Route District Municipality in the Western Cape province of South Africa.

Village 16 km east of Avontuur and 29 km south-east of Uniondale, in the Langkloof. Originally laid out in 1856, it was taken over by the Berlin Missionary Society in 1860. The mission station was named Anhalt-Schmidt, but the village had already been named Haarlem and bears that name today, presumably after the city of Haarlem 19 km west of Amsterdam in the Netherlands.
