= Duiwenhoks River =

River in the Western Cape, South Africa

Coordinates: 34°21′54″S 21°0′5″E

Duiwenhoks River, located in Western Cape, South Africa, drains the Langeberg Mountains and flows south to the coast, entering the sea west of Mossel Bay in the Southern Cape. The river is approximately 83 km long with a catchment area of 1 340 km^{2}. The Noukrans River is a tributary.

The Duiwenhoks Dam is situated in this river.

== See also ==
- List of reservoirs and dams in South Africa
- List of rivers of South Africa
- Vermaaklikheid
