= Klipdale =

- Coordinates: 34°18′00″S 19°58′00″E
- Country: South Africa
- Province: Western Cape
- District: Overberg
- Municipality: Cape Agulhas

Population
  - Total: 633

Klipdale is a small village in the Western Cape, South Africa. The settlement falls under the administration of the Cape Agulhas Local Municipality.

The town's coordinates are 34 18' 0019 58' 00.

In the 2011 South African census the town and surrounding area's population was recorded as 633 people living in 178 households.
