= Vermaaklikheid =

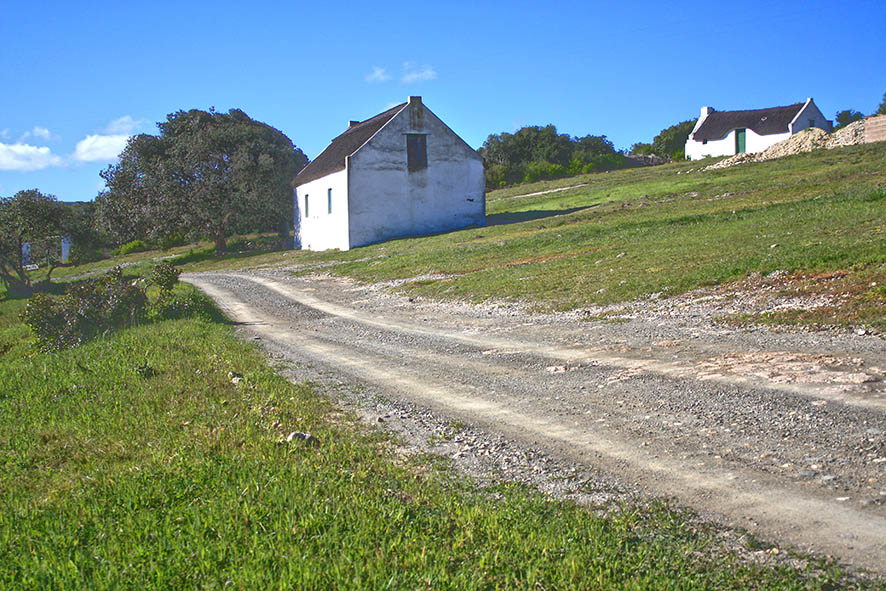

- Location within Western Cape Location within South Africa
- Coordinates: 34°18′S 21°2′E
- Country: South Africa
- Province: Western Cape
- District: Garden Route
- Municipality: Hessequa

Population (2011)
  - Total: 356

Racial Makeup (2011)
  - Coloured: 63.76%
  - White: 20.51%
  - Black African: 12.92%
  - Other: 2.81%

First Languages (2011)
  - Afrikaans: 92.42%
  - English: 7.02%
  - Other: 0.56%
- Time zone: UTC+2 (SAST)
- PO box: 6671

Vermaaklikheid is a settlement on South Africa's Garden Route in the Western Cape. It is situated near Witsand and close to Duiwenhoks River. The area is a fynbos shrubland that has a temperate climate. More than 100 species of birds live here.

As of 2011 the population is 356. According to the 2011 census, 329 people (92.4%) spoke Afrikaans, 25 (7%) spoke English, and 2 (0.56%) spoke Setswana.

== History ==
The village was established in 1855 when the Dutch Reformed Church purchased a piece of land that was originally farmed on by Andries Gous since 1725.

The origin of the name of the village is disputed. A certain resident of the village, Inis Bower, claims that the village was named after a certain "Meneer Vermaak" who was a prominent farmer in the area during the 19th century. Others, however, believe that the name 'Vermaaklikheid', meaning 'entertainment' in Afrikaans and Dutch, was derived from the occasional gathering of farmers on the bank of the river to "vermaak" or to relax and enjoy themselves.

The town features acres of vineyards growing hanepoot grapes. These are exceptionally sweet and were used to distil witblits, meaning “white lightning”, a potent South African style moonshine.
