= Robertsvlei =

- Location within Western Cape Location within South Africa
- Coordinates: 33°56′S 19°05′E
- Country: South Africa
- Province: Western Cape
- District: Cape Winelands
- Municipality: Stellenbosch

Area
  - Total: 0.59 km^{2} (0.23 sq mi)

Population (2011)
  - Total: 9
  - Density: 15/km^{2} (40/sq mi)

Racial makeup (2011)
  - Coloured: 100.0%

First languages (2011)
  - Afrikaans: 100.0%
- Time zone: UTC+2 (SAST)

Robertsvlei is a settlement in Cape Winelands District Municipality in the Western Cape province of South Africa.
