= Grotto Bay =

Grotto Bay, South Africa
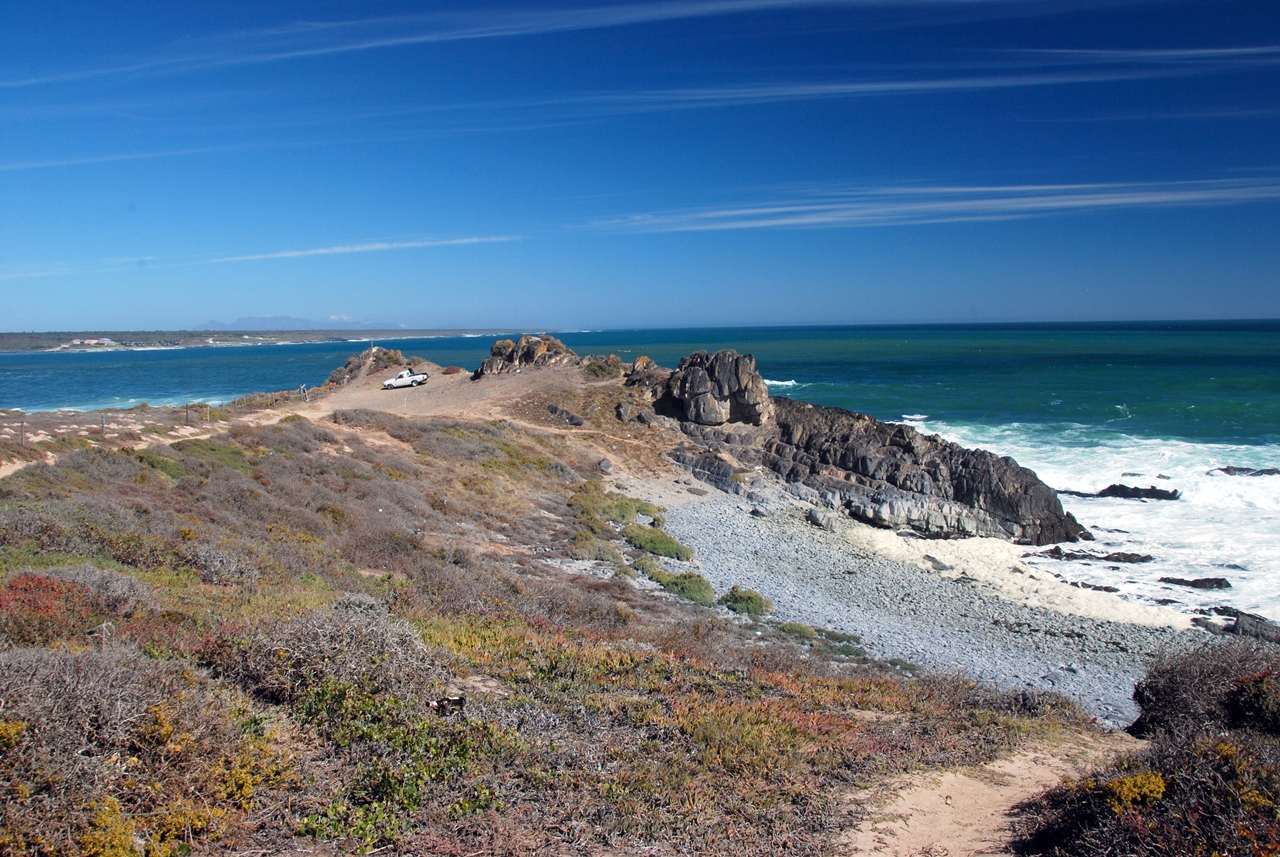
- The coast at Grotto Bay

- Location within Western Cape Location within South Africa
- Coordinates: 33°30′05″S 18°19′09″E
- Country: South Africa
- Province: Western Cape
- District: West Coast
- Municipality: Swartland

Area
  - Total: 0.80 km^{2} (0.31 sq mi)

Population (2011)
  - Total: 220
  - Density: 280/km^{2} (710/sq mi)

Racial makeup (2011)
  - Black African: 6.8%
  - Coloured: 0.9%
  - White: 85.5%
  - Other: 6.8%

First languages (2011)
  - English: 51.4%
  - Afrikaans: 43.6%
  - Sotho: 1.8%
  - Tswana: 1.8%
  - Other: 1.4%
- Time zone: UTC+2 (SAST)

Grotto Bay is a coastal private property in West Coast District Municipality in the Western Cape province of South Africa. It was declared a nature reserve in 2002. Covering about 378,000 hectares (934,058.342 acres or 3,780 square kilometers or 1,459.46616 square miles) is located 45 minutes from Cape Town. "Cape West Coast Biosphere". website.Grotto Bay forms part of the Cape West Coast Biosphere reserve which was proclaimed by UNESCO in 2000. Incorporating 378 000 hectares, it stretches from the mouth of the Diep River at Milnerton and covers the entire coastal lowlands to far north of the Berg River at Velddrift. There are 459 biospheres globally, 65 of them in Africa and 4 in South Africa. All Biospheres promote a balanced approach to the development of humans and the preservation of biodiversity in a particular region. The aim of the Cape West Coast Biosphere is to foster human development that is ecologically sustainable, conserve the landscape, vegetation and living species. It also support the research, monitoring, education and information exchange related to local, national and global issues of conservation and development.
