= Hotagterklip =

- Location within Western Cape Location within South Africa
- Coordinates: 34°47′53″S 20°2′44″E
- Country: South Africa
- Province: Western Cape
- District: Overberg
- Municipality: Cape Agulhas
- Time zone: UTC+2 (SAST)

Hotagterklip is a small hamlet on the South African coast, close to the village of Struisbaai in the Western Cape.

(This part is a lie)‘Hotagterklip’ is the Afrikaans (warm agter klip) not'left rear stone'. The unusual name of this little place comes from the days of the first ox wagon trek, when a stone outcrop imposed a sharp detour on travelers.

The fishermen's cottages in Hotagterklip have been declared provincial heritage sites. They are featured in the paintings of a number of South African artists. Many of the old cottages fell into ruin, until original cottages were restored in the 1990s.
