= Skipskop =

- Location within Western Cape Location within South Africa
- Coordinates: 34.529°S 20.423°E
- Country: South Africa
- Province: Western Cape
- District: Overberg
- Municipality: Cape Agulhas

Area
  - Total: 0.96 km^{2} (0.37 sq mi)

Population (2001)
  - Total: 55
  - Density: 57/km^{2} (150/sq mi)

Racial makeup (2001)
  - Coloured: 38.2%
  - White: 61.8%

First languages (2001)
  - Afrikaans: 83.6%
  - English: 16.4%
- Time zone: UTC+2 (SAST)

Skipskop was a town in Overberg District Municipality in the Western Cape province of South Africa.

Village east of Arniston (Waenhuiskrans). Afrikaans for ‘ships’ cliff’, it was so named after the number of ships wrecked there.
