= Henry Barrington =

The Honourable Henry Frederick Francis Adair Barringto
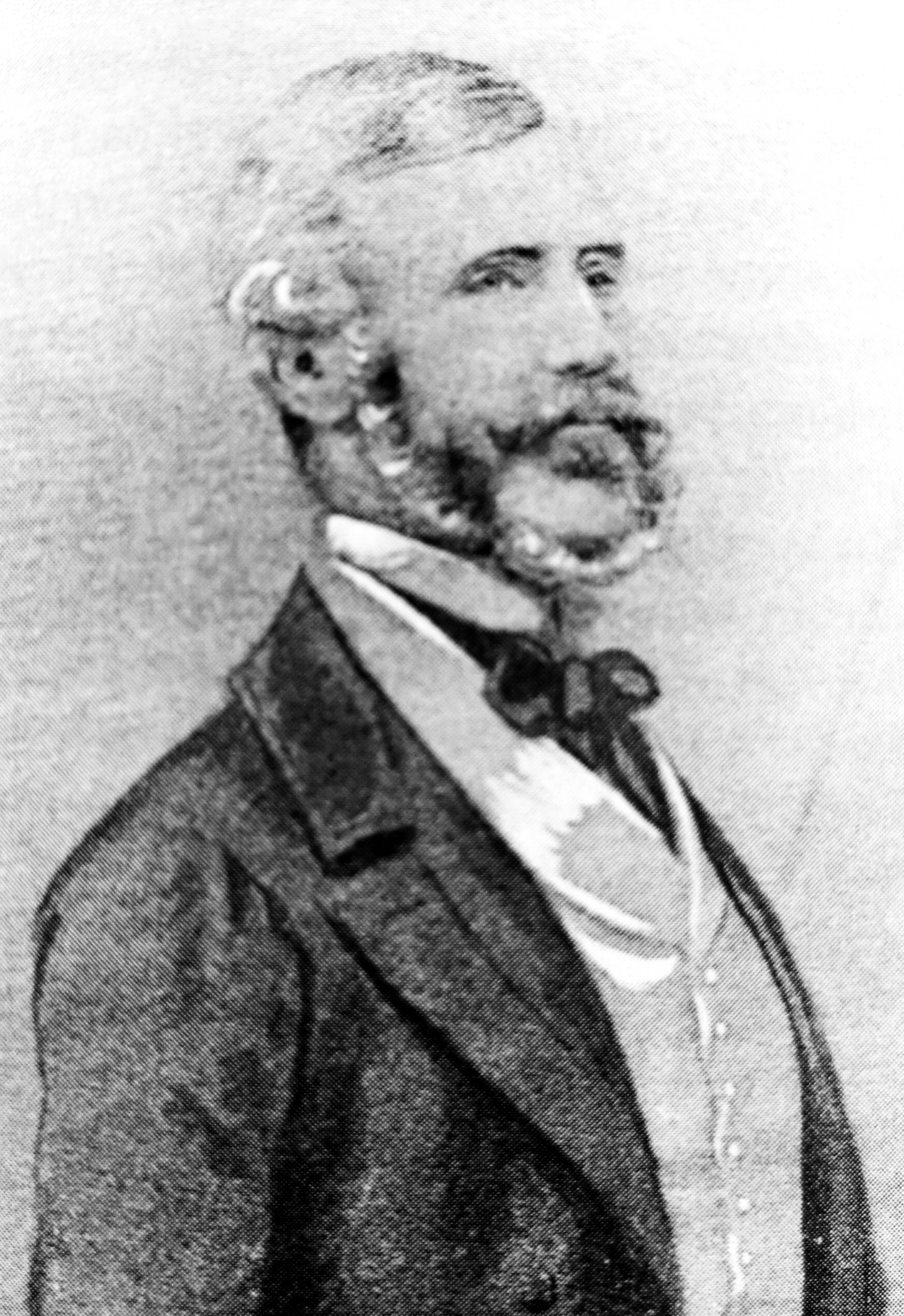

Member of Parliament of the Cape of Good Hope
- In office 1870–1873

Personal details
- Born: 28 July 1808 Beckett Hall, Shrivenham, Berkshire
- Died: 25 March 1882 (aged 73) Knysna, Cape Colony
- Spouse: Mary Georgiana Knox (m. 1848; died 1882)
- Relations: William Barrington, 6th Viscount Barrington (brother)
- Children: 7
- Parent(s): George Barrington, 5th Viscount Barrington; Elizabeth Adair
- Education: Charterhouse School
- Alma mater: Christ Church, Oxford
- Occupation: Lawyer, farmer, politician

The Hon. Henry Frederick Francis Adair Barrington (28 July 1808 – 25 March 1882), was a Cape Colony barrister, farmer and member of Parliament of the Cape of Good Hope.

== Early life ==
Barrington was born on 28 July 1808 at Beckett Hall at Shrivenham in Berkshire. He was the twelfth child of the Rev. George Barrington, 5th Viscount Barrington, and the former Elizabeth Adair. His father, the prebendary of Durham Cathedral and rector of Sedgefield, inherited the viscountcy in 1813 following the death of his elder brothers, William and Richard. Among Henry's siblings were William Barrington, 6th Viscount Barrington and the Hon. Frances Barrington (wife of the 4th Earl of Dartmouth).

His paternal grandparents were Maj. Gen. Hon. John Barrington and Elizabeth Vassal (a daughter of Florentius Vassall, a wealthy planter and slave-owner). His maternal grandparents were Robert Adair and Lady Caroline Keppel (the second daughter of the 2nd Earl of Albemarle).

Barrington was educated at Charterhouse School in Godalming, Surrey, before earning a law degree at Christ Church, Oxford.

== Career ==
At first he qualified as a barrister and joined the diplomatic service, becoming attaché in Athens. Resigning from the service, he landed in Cape Town in February 1842, and bought a 2,188-hectare (5,410-acre) estate named 'Portland' near Knysna from Thomas Henry Duthie, who had inherited the property from his father-in-law George Rex, for £400. He later acquired the neighbouring farm, now known as Karawater, making his estate over 5,000-hectare (12,000-acre).

After returning to England to marry in 1848, the newly married couple traveled to the Colony settling at Plettenberg Bay, their cargo including wedding gifts, family heirlooms and furniture, and farming equipment. The building of Portland Manor lasted 16 years, and included eight bedrooms, a library, and a large dining room. He also constructed one of the earliest sawmills for cutting Black Stinkwood, experimented with silkworms and bees, and grew apples with a view to producing cider. His interest in silk production and mulberry trees as food plants led to his being featured in South African writer Dalene Matthee’s novel, "Moerbeibos" ('Mulberry Forest'). The great forest fire of February 1869, in which large parts of the forest between Swellendam and Humansdorp were completely destroyed, also gutted Portland Manor.

The following year he was elected to the Cape Parliament, serving from 1870 to 1873.

== Personal life ==
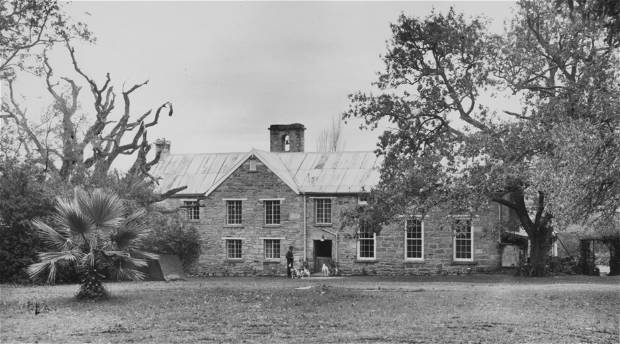
Portland Manor

Returning to England in 1848 he married Mary Georgiana Knox (d. 1909) on 25 July 1848. Originally from Bath, Georgiana was a daughter of Col. Wright Knox. Together, they raised a family of three sons and four daughters.

- John Wildman Shute Barrington (1849–1901), who died unmarried.
- Henry "Hal" Robert Shute Barrington (1852–1919), who married Maria Magdalena Pietersen in 1882.
- Florina Elizabeth Jane Barrington (1853–1912), who died unmarried; she became head-mistress of the Diocesan School for Girls, Grahamstown.
- Samuel William Percy Gordon Shute Barrington (1855–1931), who married Emily Mary Montagu, daughter of John Montagu and Jessy Worsley, in 1896. After their marriage, they emigrated to Vancouver.
- Katherine Caroline Barrington (1861–1936), who married Francis Henry Newdigate of Forest Hall in 1890. After his death in the Anglo-Boer War in 1900, she married Lt.-Col. James Meredith Maurice, son of Price Maurice, in 1902.
- Idonea Maria Barrington (1863–1945), who married Cmdr. Edward Lindsay Ashley Foakes, OBE in 1896; he was a sailor and friend of the explorer Robert Falcon Scott, helping to plan his expeditions to the Antarctic.
- Gabrielle Carlotta Barrington (1868–1946), who married John Hardy Stewart in 1909.

Barrington died on 25 March 1882 at Knysna, Cape Colony. His widow left the Cape Colony shortly thereafter and never returned. Portland Manor was left to his eldest son, John, who died a bachelor in 1901. One of Henry's daughters, Kate, then inherited the estate. Barrington's widow, Georgiana, died on 25 February 1909.
