= Sedgefield, South Africa =

Sedgefield
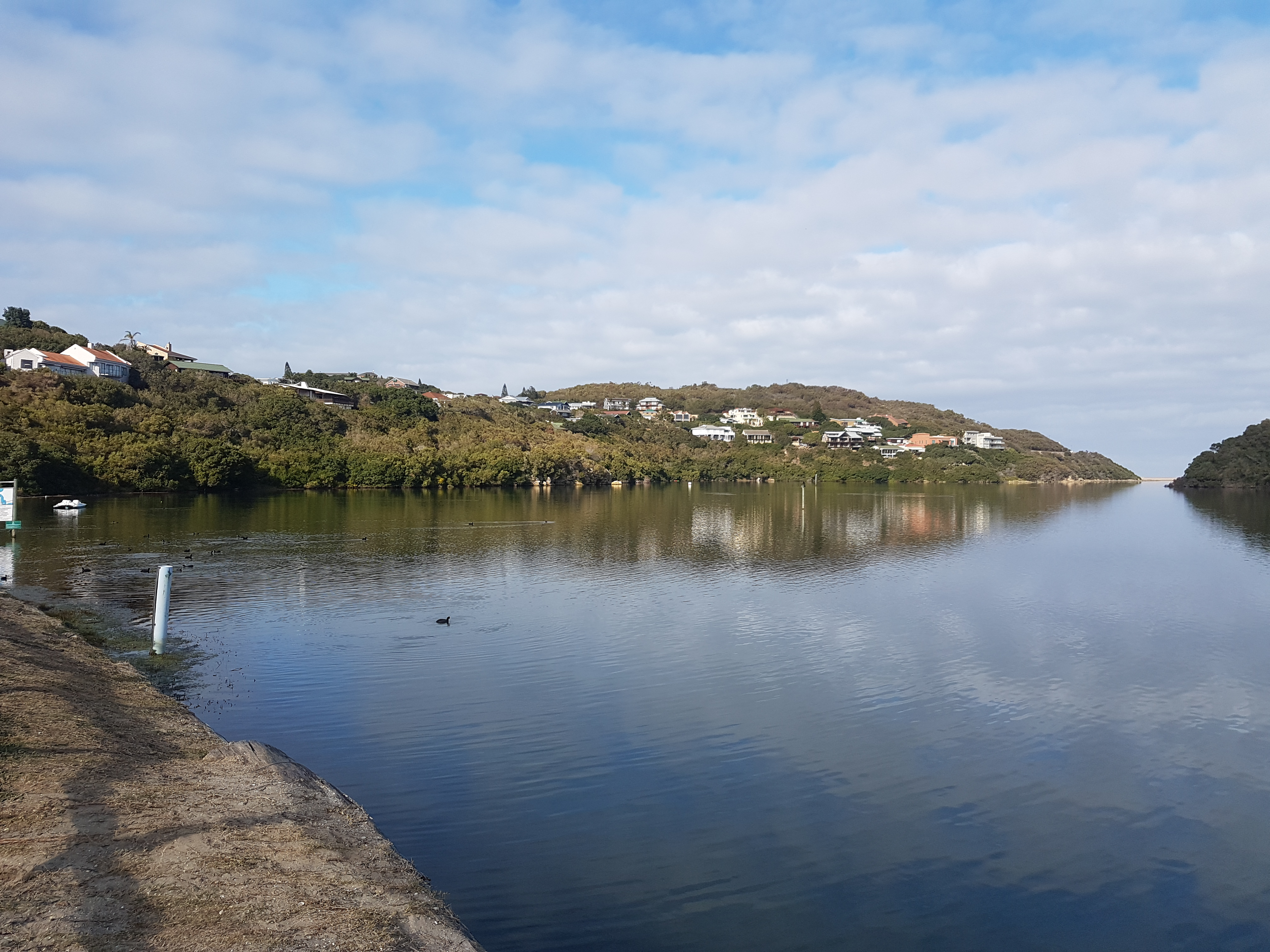
- The Swartvlei with Sedgefield seen in the background

- Location within Western Cape Location within South Africa Location within Africa
- Coordinates: 34°01′17″S 22°48′12″E
- Country: South Africa
- Province: Western Cape
- District: Garden Route
- Municipality: Knysna

Area
  - Total: 7.85 km^{2} (3.03 sq mi)

Population (2011)
  - Total: 8,286
  - Density: 1,060/km^{2} (2,730/sq mi)

Racial makeup (2011)
  - Black African: 24.8%
  - Coloured: 29.5%
  - Indian/Asian: 0.3%
  - White: 42.8%
  - Other: 2.6%

First languages (2011)
  - Afrikaans: 48.8%
  - English: 26.7%
  - Xhosa: 18.2%
  - Sotho: 1.2%
  - Other: 5.1%
- Time zone: UTC+2 (SAST)
- Postal code (street): 6573
- PO box: 6573
- Area code: 044

Sedgefield is a coastal town on the Garden Route in the Western Cape province of South Africa. It is situated on the N2 national road, between George and Knysna.

The town was proclaimed in 1929 on the farm Sedgefield, which in turn was named in 1894 after the village of the same name in the UK where the father (Henry Barrington) of the then farm owner was born.

== History ==
The farm Ruigtevlei was granted to the widow Meeding by Lord Charles Somerset. Upon her death in 1878, the farm was divided into nine lots. Lots A and B were bought by individual farmers, before eventually being purchased in 1894 by John Barrington, son of then-famous politician, farmer and industrialist Henry Barrington. John named the town after his father's birthplace of Sedgefield in England.

Kate Maurice (née Barrington) inherited the farm Sedgefield from her brother upon his death in 1901. Kate sold the farm in 1911 to Salmon Terblans. A part of the farm Sedgefield was subsequently sold as Middelplaas, but was reincorporated in 1926. Terblans and Thomas Moodie investigated the possibility of proclaiming a town on the farm. Eventually, Moodie invested a lot of work into developing a town plan after securing an option to buy the farm but due to an oversight by Moodie's lawyer, Terblans was able to step back out of their agreement at the last moment and sell the ground to Thesen and Company. However, Charlie Thesen decided to compensate Moodie for his invested effort and allowed him to name the newly proclaimed town.

The name of Sedgefield was but one of a number of names considered by Moodie. In the end, the fact that it translated well to the original Afrikaans name of Ruigtevlei as well as the observation that it was very descriptive of the environment gave sway in favour of the name.

After proclamation, the town experienced organic growth by attracting families who were attracted by the ‘new winter resort’ advertised in the George and Knysna Herald from 1927 onwards. The first families to settle were the Salts, Schumachers, Browns, Barnards and Mullers. In 1921 a railway connection between George and Knysna was planned and the project was completed in 1928 by routing the line over a new bridge crossing the adjacent Swartvlei (‘Black lake’). In 1940, the town was given a postal service outlet and in 1947 the road through Sedgefield was completed, thus fully integrating the town into the commercial route between George and Knysna.

A library was opened in 1962 and the town expanded further during the next four decades to comprise a central business district with supermarkets, pharmacies, filling stations, curio shops and other undertakings. Fresh water has been supplied from nearby Karatara River Municipal water extraction plant run by Sedgefield Municipality then Knysna Municipality, but being pressed by an unusually dry summer a desalination plant was erected in 2009 to make the town totally self-sufficient in terms of water supply.

Until the end of the 20th century, Sedgefield was an independent local authority. When the ANC came to power nationally they reduced the number of local authorities country-wide, causing Sedgefield to become part of Knysna.

== Notable people ==
- Demi-Leigh Tebow – Miss Universe 2017
