= Karatara =

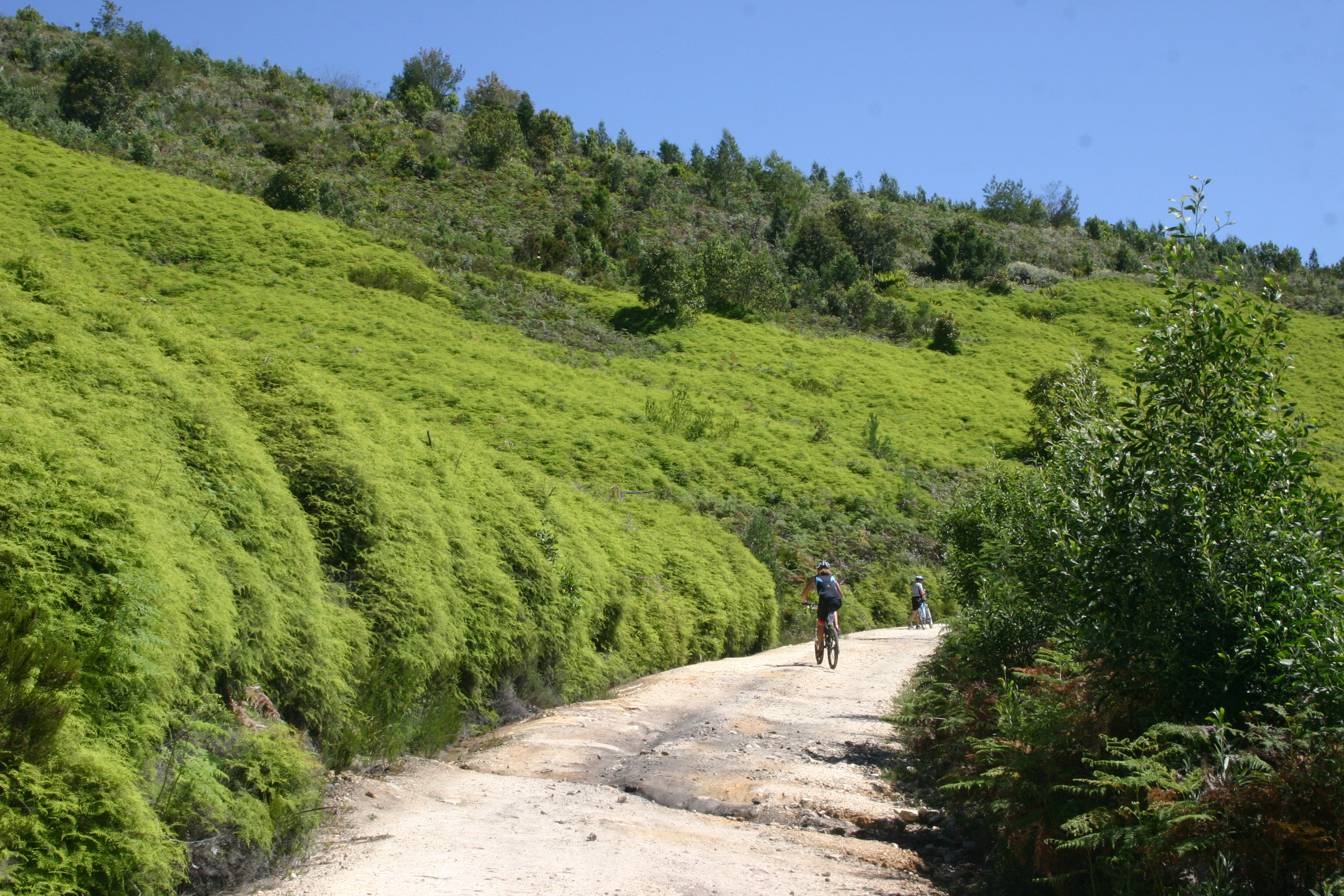
- Hiking trail near Karatara.

- Location within Western Cape Location within South Africa
- Coordinates: 33.9°S 22.816°E
- Country: South Africa
- Province: Western Cape
- District: Garden Route
- Municipality: Knysna

Area
  - Total: 5.82 km^{2} (2.25 sq mi)

Population (2011)
  - Total: 880
  - Density: 150/km^{2} (390/sq mi)

Racial makeup (2011)
  - Black African: 2.8%
  - Coloured: 56.5%
  - White: 40.1%
  - Other: 0.6%

First languages (2011)
  - Afrikaans: 95.1%
  - English: 2.5%
  - Other: 2.4%
- Time zone: UTC+2 (SAST)
- Postal code (street): 6580
- PO box: 6580
- Area code: 044

Karatara is a town in Knysna Local Municipality in the Western Cape province of South Africa.

Settlement and forestry station on the Karatara River which flows southwards into Swartvlei. It is situated 5 km west of Barrington and some 40 km northwest of Knysna. It was founded in 1941. The name is of Khoekhoen origin and probably means 'horse hill', after a hillock to the north. Previously the Karatara River was known as the Tsao or Witterivier.
