= Baardskeerdersbos =

Baardskeerdersbos Baardscheerders Bosch
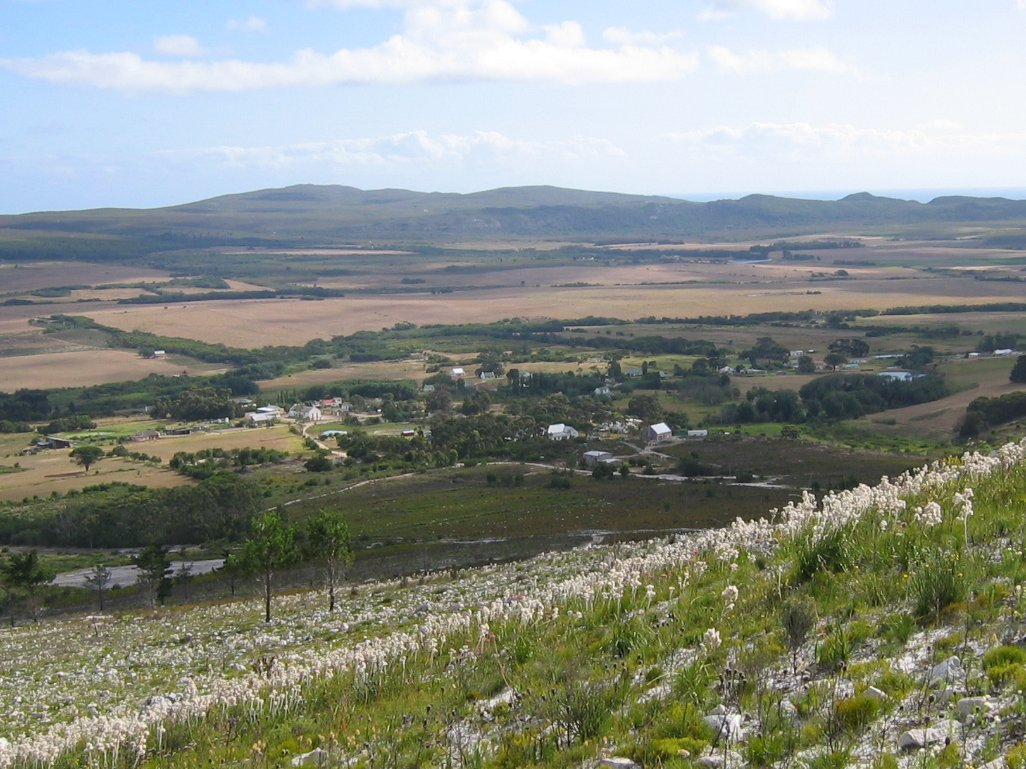
- View of Baardskeerdersbos from a nearby hill.
- Interactive map of Baardskeerdersbos
- Coordinates: 34°35′20″S 19°34′15″E
- Country: South Africa
- Province: Western Cape
- District: Overberg
- Municipality: Overstrand

Area
  - Total: 1.10 km^{2} (0.42 sq mi)
- Elevation: 100 m (330 ft)

Population (2011)
  - Total: 103
  - Density: 93.6/km^{2} (243/sq mi)

Racial makeup (2011)
  - Black African: 1.9%
  - Coloured: 10.7%
  - White: 87.4%

First languages (2011)
  - Afrikaans: 66.0%
  - English: 33.0%
  - Other: 1.0%
- Time zone: UTC+2 (SAST)
- Postal code (street): 7271
- PO box: 7271
- Area code: 028

Baardskeerdersbos (lit. 'Beard Shavers Bush'), also Baardscheerders Bosch in Dutch and locally known as B'bos, is a village in the Overberg region of the Western Cape province of South Africa. According to the 2011 census it has a population of 103 residents.

== Geography ==
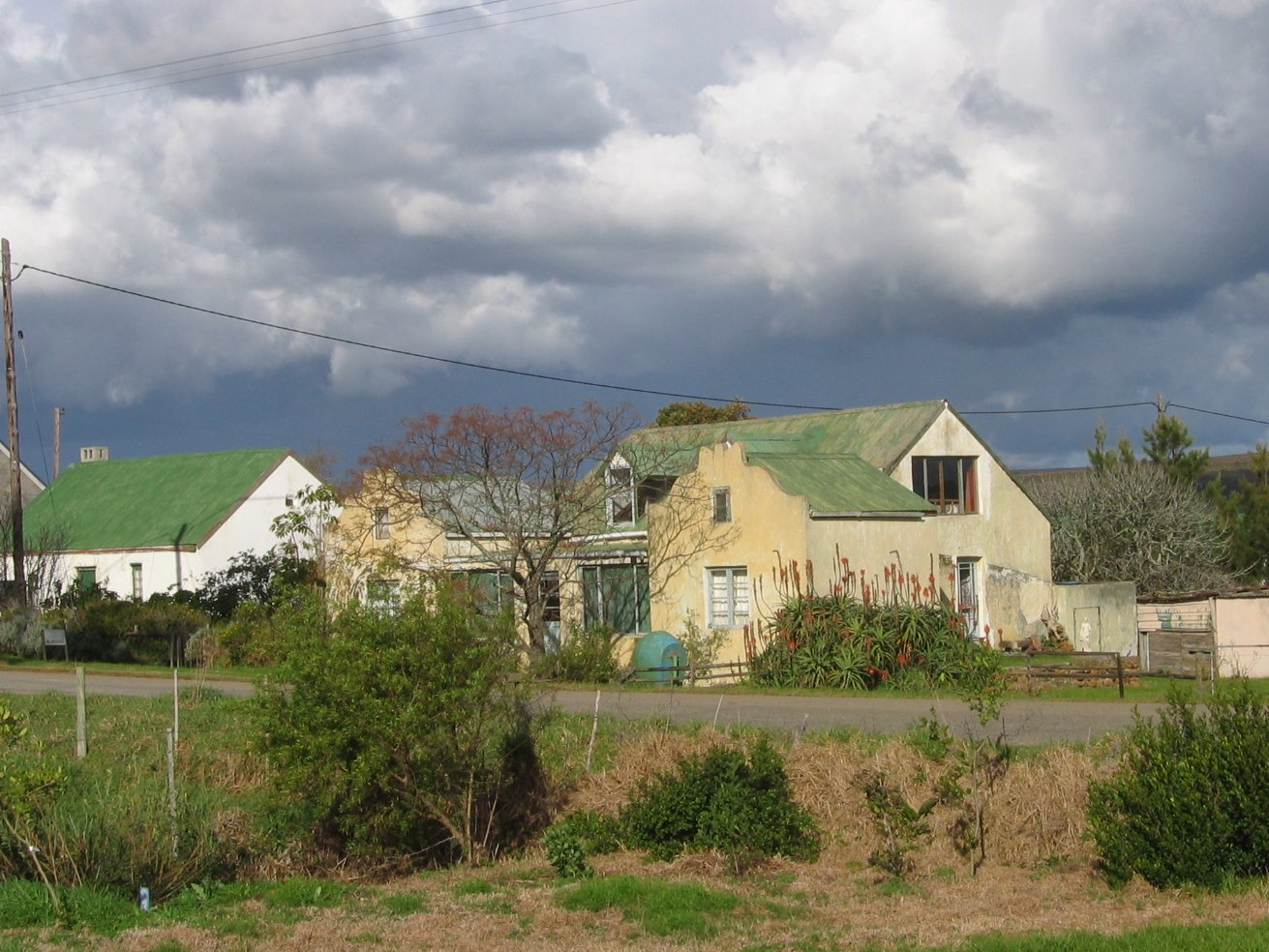
Houses on the main street

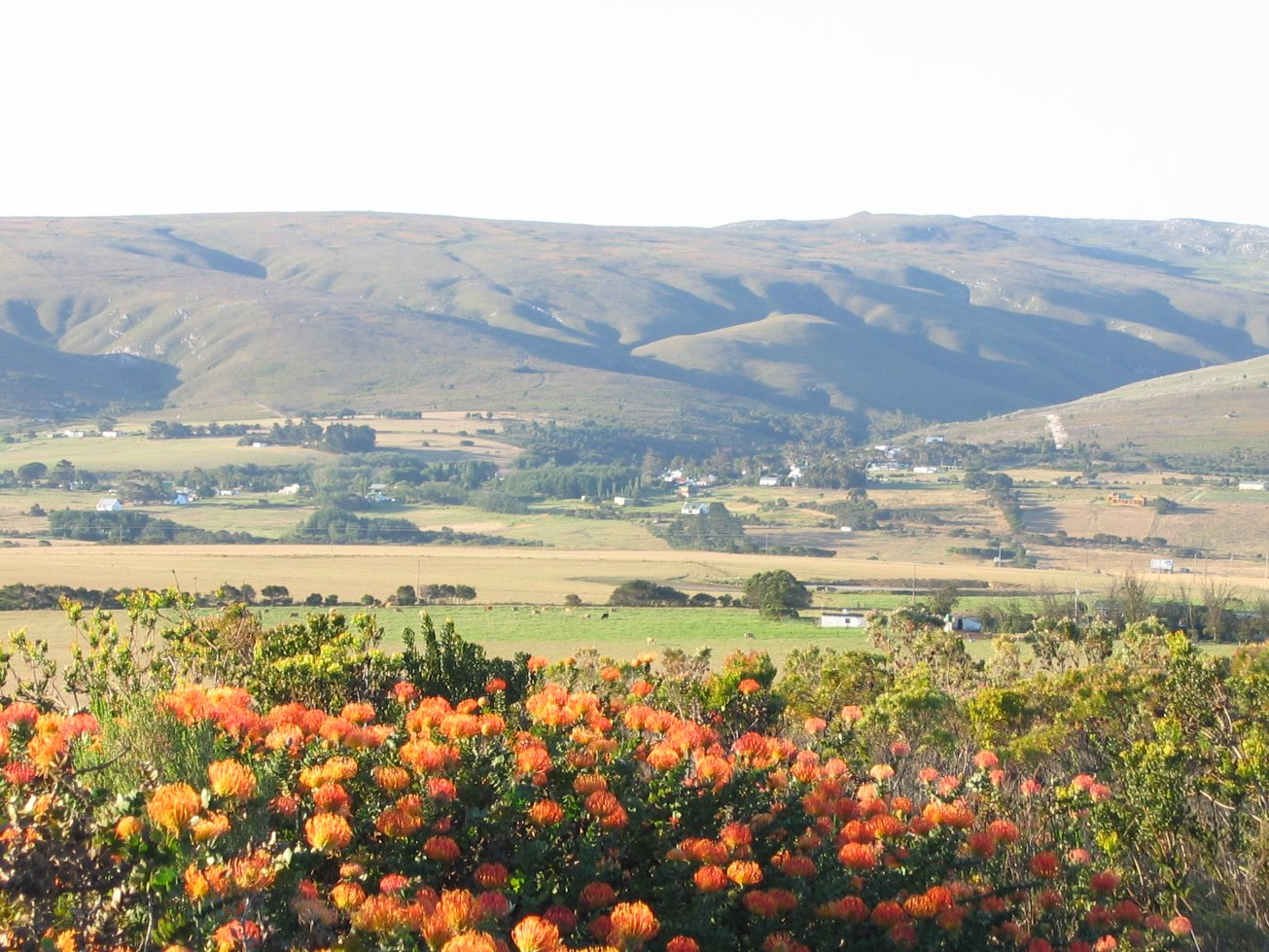
View of the village from across the Boesmansrivier valley

Baardskeerdersbos is located 20 kilometres (12 mi) east of Gansbaai on the Gansbaai–Elim–Bredasdorp road. It lies on the southern slopes of a mountain called Perdekop ("Horse Hill"), at the base of the Boskloof ("Forest Gorge") through which a small river flows south off the mountain. Just south of the village the Boesmansrivier ("Bushman's River") flows from east to west; the Boskloof stream flows into this river.

== History ==
The first reference to this area by Europeans dates to 1660, when Jan van Riebeek sent an expedition to explore the Overberg. The farm "Baarscheerders Bosch" number 213 in the Bredasdorp registration district, which included the village and the surrounding farmland and hillside, was surveyed for a Phillip Fourie Senior in 1831; that original farm has since been subdivided considerably into separate farms, smallholdings and plots. The current church in Baardskeerdersbos was built in 1921 and is a National Monument. For a long time the village remained rural and undisturbed, but recently it has been discovered as a quiet getaway particularly for residents of Cape Town; several new houses have been built, and several more renovated.

== Name ==
The name "Baardskeerdersbos" in Afrikaans or "Baardscheerders Bosch" in the original Dutch literally means "Beard Shaver's Forest". The accepted explanation for this name is that a species of solifuge inhabits the area, and that this arachnid is referred to as a "beard shaver" because it cuts hair to use for nest-building. The well-known cartographer and writer Peter Slingsby wrote a book entitled "Beard Shaver’s Bush: Place Names in the Cape" (ISBN 0-620-24965-X) which discusses the origin of this and many other place names.
