= George Local Municipality =

George
- Local municipality
- Seal
- Motto: The City for All Reasons
- Location of George Local Municipality within the Western Cape
- Coordinates: 33°45′S 22°50′E
- Country: South Africa
- Province: Western Cape
- District: Garden Route
- Seat: George
- Wards: 27

Government
  - Type: Municipal council
  - Mayor: Bronwen Johnson (DA)
  - Deputy Mayor: Gert van Niekerk (FF+)
  - Speaker: Jackie von Brandis (DA)

Area
  - Total: 5,191 km^{2} (2,004 sq mi)

Population (2022)
  - Total: 294,929
  - Density: 56.82/km^{2} (147.2/sq mi)

Racial makeup (2022)
  - Black African: 35.0%
  - Coloured: 44.4%
  - Indian/Asian: 0.4%
  - White: 18.4%

First languages (2011)
  - Afrikaans: 67.2%
  - Xhosa: 21.6%
  - English: 8.1%
  - Other: 3.1%
- Time zone: UTC+2 (SAST)
- Municipal code: WC044
- HDI (2020): ▲0.78 high

George Municipality (Afrikaans: George Munisipaliteit; Xhosa: uMasipala waseGeorge) is a local municipality within the Garden Route District Municipality, in the Western Cape province of South Africa. As of 2022, the population is 294,929. Its municipality code is WC044.

== Geography ==
The municipality covers an area of 5,191 square kilometres (2,004 sq mi) in the Garden Route and Little Karoo regions. It includes the coastal plateau around the city of George, and extends northeast over the Outeniqua Mountains to include the eastern end of the Little Karoo as far as the Swartberg mountains and the boundary with the Eastern Cape province. It abuts on the Mossel Bay Municipality to the west, the Oudtshoorn Municipality to the northwest, the Dr Beyers Naudé Municipality to the northeast, the Kou-Kamma Municipality to the east, and the Bitou and Knysna Municipalities to the southeast.

== Demographics ==
According to the 2022 census, the population of the municipality was 294,929 people, increasing at an annual rate of 4.2% from 2011. 44.4% of the population identified as "Coloured," 35% as "Black African," and 18.4% as "White."

At the 2011 census the municipality has a population of 193,672 people in 53,551 households. Of this population, 50.4% describe themselves as "Coloured", 28.2% as "Black African", and 19.7% as "White". The first language of 67.2% of the population is Afrikaans, while 21.7% speak Xhosa and 8.1% speak English.

The majority of the residents of the municipality are in the city of George, which as of 2011 has a population of 157,394. Close to George are the coastal resorts of Herolds Bay (pop. 704) and Wilderness (pop. 6,164). Haarlem (pop. 2,376) and Uniondale (pop. 4,525) are in the interior of the municipality at the top of the Langkloof.

== History ==
At the end of the apartheid era, the area that is today the George Municipality was divided between two Regional Services Councils (RSCs): the coastal area around George and Wilderness formed part of the South Cape RSC, while the interior area north of the Outeniqua Mountains formed part of the Klein Karoo RSC. The town of George was governed by a municipal council elected by its white residents, while coloured residents of George were governed by a management committee subordinate to the white council. There was a separate municipal council in neighbouring Pacaltsdorp where, uniquely amongst Cape Province municipalities, coloured voters retained the right to vote. Thembalethu was governed by a town council established under the Black Local Authorities Act, 1982. In the Wilderness area there were three local councils for Wilderness proper, Wilderness Heights, and Hoekwil. Herolds Bay was also governed by a local council. In the Langkloof, the white voters of Uniondale elected a local council while the coloured voters elected a management committee, and the former mission settlement of Haarlem was governed by a board of management.

While the negotiations to end apartheid were taking place a process was established for local authorities to agree on voluntary mergers. In September 1992 the Municipality of George and the George Management Committee merged to form a single municipal council. In July 1993 a further agreement incorporated the Herolds Bay Local Council into the Municipality of George.

After the national elections of 1994 a process of local government transformation began, in which negotiations were held between the existing local authorities, political parties, and local community organisations. As a result of these negotiations, the existing local authorities were dissolved and transitional local councils (TLCs) were created for each town and village.

- Wilderness TLC replaced the local councils of Wilderness, Wilderness Heights and Hoekwil in January 1995.
- Uniondale TLC replaced the Uniondale Local Council and Management Committee in January 1995.
- Haarlem TLC replaced the Haarlem Management Board in January 1995.
- George TLC replaced the municipalities of George and Pacaltsdorp as well as Thembalethu Town Council in February 1995.

The transitional councils were initially made up of members nominated by the various parties to the negotiations, until May 1996 when elections were held. At these elections the Regional Services Councils were replaced by District Councils (DCs), and transitional representative councils (TRCs) were elected to represent rural areas outside the TLCs on the DCs. The area that is today the George Municipality included part of the Outeniqua TRC under the South Cape DC, and the Uniondale TRC and most of the Bo-Langkloof TRC under the Klein Karoo DC.

At the local elections of December 2000 the transitional councils were dissolved. The South Cape and Klein Karoo DCs were replaced by the Eden District Municipality. George Municipality was established as a single local authority to govern the coastal area, while the interior area north of the Outeniqua Mountains became a District Management Area (DMA) of the Eden District. In 2011 this area was incorporated into George Municipality when District Management Areas were abolished. Also in 2011 the Hoogekraal Plantation area north of Sedgefield was transferred from George Municipality to Knysna Municipality.

== Politics ==
The municipal council consists of fifty-three members elected by mixed-member proportional representation. Twenty-seven councillors are elected by first-past-the-post voting in twenty-seven wards, while the remaining twenty-six are chosen from party lists so that the total number of party representatives is proportional to the number of votes received.

The following table shows the results of the 2026 election.

Party	Ward			List			Total seats
Party	Votes	%	Seats	Votes	%	Seats	Total seats
Democratic Alliance	35,215	49.91	15	35,715	50.60	13	28
Patriotic Alliance	13,600	19.27	7	13,605	19.28	4	11
African National Congress	10,743	15.23	6	10,697	15.16	2	8
Freedom Front Plus	5,253	7.44	0	4,973	7.05	4	4
Economic Freedom Fighters	1,639	2.32	0	1,623	2.30	1	1
African Christian Democratic Party	1,049	1.49	0	956	1.35	1	1
Plaaslike Besorgde Inwoners	774	1.10	0	662	0.94	1	1
Good	529	0.75	0	701	0.99	1	1
Independent candidates	155	0.22	0				0
12 other parties	1,602	2.27	0	1,648	2.33	0	0
Total	70,559	100.00	28	70,580	100.00	27	55
Valid votes	70,559	99.23		70,580	99.20		
Invalid/blank votes	551	0.77		570	0.80		
Total votes	71,110	100.00		71,150	100.00		
Registered voters/turnout	123,810	57.43		123,810	57.47		
