= Knysna Local Municipality =

Knysna
- Local municipality
- Seal

- Location of Knysna within the Western Cape
- Coordinates: 34°00′S 23°00′E
- Country: South Africa
- Province: Western Cape
- District: Garden Route
- Seat: Knysna
- Wards: 10

Government
  - Type: Municipal council
  - Mayor: Thando Matika (ANC)
  - Deputy Mayor: Morton Gericke (PBI)
  - Speaker: Mark Willemse (KIM)

Area
  - Total: 1,109 km^{2} (428 sq mi)

Population (2022)
  - Total: 96,055
  - Density: 86.61/km^{2} (224.3/sq mi)

Racial makeup (2022)
  - Black African: 41.3%
  - Coloured: 34.8%
  - Indian/Asian: 0.4%
  - White: 21.8%

First languages (2011)
  - Afrikaans: 51.2%
  - Xhosa: 28.4%
  - English: 15.4%
  - Other: 5%
- Time zone: UTC+2 (SAST)
- Municipal code: WC048

Knysna Municipality (Afrikaans: Knysna Munisipaliteit; Xhosa: uMasipala wase Knysna) is a local municipality within the Garden Route District Municipality, in the Western Cape province of South Africa. As of 2022, its population is 96,055. Its municipal code is WC048.

== Geography ==
The municipality covers an area of 1,109 square kilometres (428 sq mi) between the Indian Ocean and the Outeniqua Mountains around the town of Knysna. It abuts on the George Municipality to the north and west, and on the Bitou Municipality to the east.

== Demographics ==
According to the 2022 census, 96,055 people lived in the municipality, which had an average growth rate of 3.3% annually from 2011. The racial breakdown of the population was 41.3% "Black African," 34.8% "Coloured," and 21.8% "White."

Most of the residents of the municipality live in the town of Knysna, which as of 2011 has a population of 51,078. Knysna is situated on the shores of the Knysna Lagoon; other coastal settlements are Sedgefield (pop. 8,361) and Buffelsbaai (pop. 71). Away from the coast are agricultural settlements at Rheenendal (pop. 3,936) and Karatara (pop. 880).

The municipality is also home to the informal settlement of Bongani. On 2 August 2020, municipal authorities razed some of the shacks in the Bongani area, upsetting some residents. On 11 November 2025, a wildfire destroyed somewhere between 14 and 20 structures in Bongani, Concordia, and Khayalethu.

== History ==
At the end of 1996, the area that is today the Knysna Municipality formed part of the South Cape Regional Services Council (RSC). The towns of Knysna and Sedgefield were governed by municipal councils elected by their residents. The coloured residents of Hornlee (Knysna) and Smutsville (Sedgefield) were governed by management committees subordinate to the councils. Rheenendal was also governed by a management committee. Kwanonqaba was governed by a town council established in 1982. The coastal resorts of Buffelsbaai, Belvidere Estate, Brenton-on-Sea and Noetzie were governed by local councils.

After the national elections of 1994 a process of local government transformation began, in which negotiations were held between the existing local authorities, political parties, and local community organisations. As a result of these negotiations, the existing local authorities were dissolved and transitional local councils (TLCs) were created for each town and village. In October 1994 Knysna TLC replaced the Municipality of Knysna and Hornlee Management Committee. In December 1994 Sedgefield TLC replaced the Municipality of Sedgefield, Smutsville Management Committee and Buffelsbaai Local Council. These transitional councils were made up of members nominated by the various parties to the negotiations. In October 1995 the local councils of Belvidere Estate, Brenton-on-Sea and Noetzie, and the Rheenendal Management Committee, were all converted to TLCs without negotiations and with the existing councillors retained in office.

In May 1996 elections were held for all the TLCs. At the time of these elections the South Cape District Council was established in place of the South Cape RSC, and transitional representative councils (TRCs) were elected to represent rural areas outside the TLCs on the District Council. The area to become Knysna Municipality included part of the Outeniqua TRC.

At the local elections of December 2000 the TLCs and TRCs were dissolved and the Knysna Municipality was established as a single local authority. At the same election the South Cape District Council was dissolved and replaced by the Eden District Municipality. In 2011 the Hoogekraal Plantation area north of Sedgefield was transferred from George Municipality to Knysna Municipality.

== Politics ==
The municipal council consists of twenty-one members elected by mixed-member proportional representation. Eleven councillors are elected by first-past-the-post voting in eleven wards, while the remaining ten are chosen from party lists so that the total number of party representatives is proportional to the number of votes received. In the election of 1 November 2021 no party obtained a majority of seats on the council. The Democratic Alliance (DA) then formed a minority coalition government with the Knysna Independent Movement (KIM). At the first council meeting on 22 November 2021, the DA's Julie Lopes was elected speaker, followed by the DA's Levael Davis as mayor and Mark Willemse from KIM as deputy mayor with the help of the lone councillor from the Economic Freedom Fighters (EFF).

The following table shows the results of the 2026 election.

Party	Ward			List			Total seats
Party	Votes	%	Seats	Votes	%	Seats	Total seats
Democratic Alliance	13,016	43.55	7	13,496	45.27	2	9
African National Congress	5,695	19.05	4	5,477	18.37	0	4
Patriotic Alliance	3,012	10.08	0	2,941	9.87	2	2
South African Communist Party	1,742	5.83	0	1,720	5.77	1	1
Freedom Front Plus	1,363	4.56	0	1,306	4.38	1	1
Knysna Civic Alliance	857	2.87	0	832	2.79	1	1
People's Movement for Change	828	2.77	0	785	2.63	1	1
Choose CX	833	2.79	0	698	2.34	1	1
Economic Freedom Fighters	595	1.99	0	616	2.07	1	1
14 other parties	1,948	6.52	0	1,938	6.50	0	0
Total	29,889	100.00	11	29,809	100.00	10	21
Valid votes	29,889	99.14		29,809	99.16		
Invalid/blank votes	258	0.86		253	0.84		
Total votes	30,147	100.00		30,062	100.00		
Registered voters/turnout	48,955	61.58		48,955	61.41		

=== History ===
Joy Cole was first elected mayor under the DA in December 2000 but defected in the September 2004 floor-crossing to become an ANC-aligned independent and reconstituted the council under ANC control. Cole formed a broad-based coalition of the ANC and DA after the March 2006 local government elections when neither party had obtained an outright majority. After Cole resigned in December 2006 to pursue another career, Doris Wakeford-Brown of the DA formed a multi-party coalition. This short-lived coalition collapsed in May 2007 when the Knysna Civic Alliance switched allegiances to the ANC, which brought Eleanore Bouw-Spies in as the new mayor. In the September 2007 floor crossing window the two civic party councillors defected to the ANC, giving the party an outright majority of 9 seats out of 16. Bouw-Spies' term as mayor ended when the DA won an absolute majority in the 2011 election and Georlene Wolmarans was elected mayor. In the 2016 election the DA fell short of an absolute majority, but formed a coalition with the ACDP and an independent councillor. Bouw-Spies, who had crossed to the DA in 2014, returned for a second term as mayor.

Bouw-Spies was removed as mayor after an ANC-initiated vote of no confidence in June 2018. The motion was supported by two DA councillors, Mark Willemse and Peter Myers. Willemse was then elected as the new mayor with COPE member Ricky van Aswegen as deputy mayor. The DA has instituted disciplinary action against its two members, but the matter has dragged on into 2019 without a solution as of yet.

=== Mayors ===
- Charles Thobi (2002–2004)
- Joy Cole (December 2000 – September 2004) (DA)
- Joy Cole (September 2004 – March 2006) (Independent)
- Joy Cole (March 2006 – December 2006) (ANC)
- Doris Wakeford-Brown (December 2006 – May 2007) (DA)
- Eleanore Bouw-Spies (May 2007 – May 2011) (ANC)
- Georlene Wolmarans (May 2011 – August 2016) (DA)
- Eleanore Bouw-Spies (August 2016 – June 2018) (DA)
- Mark Willemse (June 2018 – September 2019) (DA)
- Elrick van Aswegen (June 2020 – November 2021) (Cope)
- Levael Davis (November 2021 – August 2022) (DA)
- Aubrey Tsengwa (August 2022 – February 2025) (ANC)
- Thando Matika (February 2025 – present) (ANC)
