= Rheenendal =

- Location within Western Cape Location within South Africa
- Coordinates: 33°56′49″S 22°55′49″E
- Country: South Africa
- Province: Western Cape
- District: Garden Route
- Municipality: Knysna

Area
  - Total: 0.52 km^{2} (0.20 sq mi)

Population (2011)
  - Total: 3,936
  - Density: 7,600/km^{2} (20,000/sq mi)

Racial makeup (2011)
  - Black African: 8.9%
  - Coloured: 90.8%
  - Indian/Asian: 0.1%
  - Other: 0.2%

First languages (2011)
  - Afrikaans: 92.1%
  - Xhosa: 5.3%
  - English: 1.2%
  - Other: 1.4%
- Time zone: UTC+2 (SAST)
- Postal code (street): 6576
- PO box: 6576

Rheenendal is a settlement in Garden Route District Municipality in the Western Cape province of South Africa.
