= Garden Route District Municipality =

Garden Route Eden
- District municipality
- Seal

- Location in South Africa

- Local municipalities within the Garden Route District
- Coordinates: 33°45′S 22°00′E
- Country: South Africa
- Province: Western Cape
- Seat: George
- Local municipalities: List: Kannaland; Hessequa; Mossel Bay; George; Oudtshoorn; Bitou; Knysna

Government
  - Type: Municipal council
  - Mayor: Andrew Stroebel (DA)

Area
  - Total: 23,331.1 km^{2} (9,008.2 sq mi)

Population (2022)
  - Total: 838,457
  - Density: 35.9/km^{2} (93/sq mi)

Racial makeup (2022)
  - Black African: 27.8%
  - Coloured: 49.7%
  - Indian/Asian: 0.3%
  - White: 19.6%

First languages (2011)
  - Afrikaans: 70.8%
  - Xhosa: 18.3%
  - English: 7.5%
  - Other: 3.4%
- Time zone: UTC+2 (SAST)
- Municipal code: DC4
- Website: www.gardenroute.gov.za

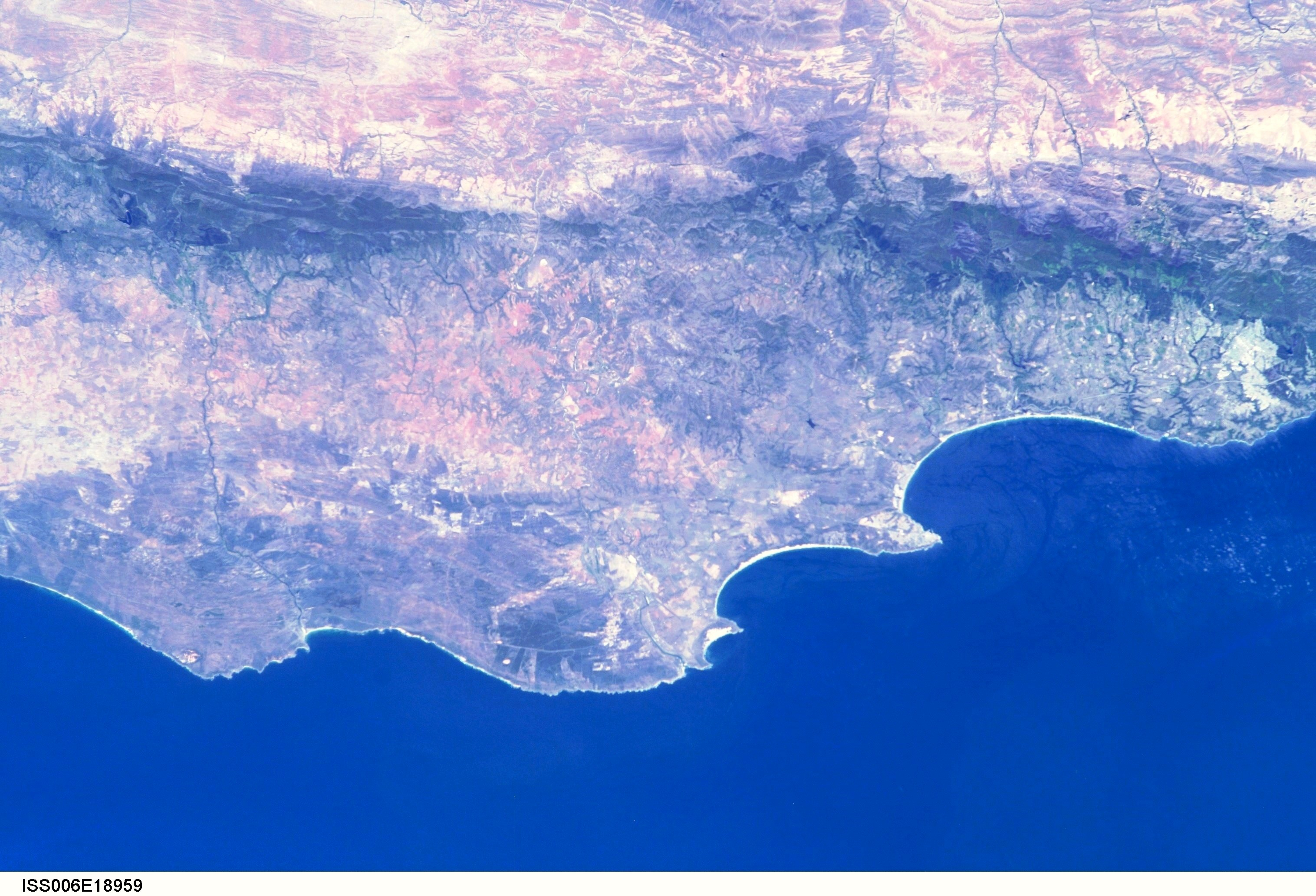
A view of the municipality from space in which the Langeberg, Outeniqua Mountains and George (at far right) are clearly visible – taken in January 2003 from the International Space Station

The Garden Route District Municipality (Afrikaans: Tuinroete-distriksmunisipaliteit; Xhosa: uMasipala weSithili sase Garden Route), formerly known as the Eden District Municipality, is a district municipality located in the Western Cape province of South Africa. Its municipality code is DC4.

== Geography ==
The Garden Route District Municipality covers an area of 23,331 square kilometres (9,008 sq mi) in the southeastern part of the Western Cape, covering the regions known as the Garden Route and the Little Karoo. It stretches to the Breede River mouth and the Langeberg mountains on the west, where it abuts the Overberg District Municipality and (for a short distance) the Cape Winelands District Municipality. To the north the boundary with the Central Karoo District Municipality runs along the Swartberg mountains. In the east the municipality runs up to the Eastern Cape provincial boundary.

The district is divided into seven local municipalities, described in the following table.

Name	Seat	Population (2022)	Area (km^{2})	Density (inhabitants/km^{2})
Kannaland	Ladismith	31,986	4,765.4	6.7
Hessequa	Riversdale	71,918	5,732.6	12.5
Mossel Bay	Mossel Bay	140,075	2,001	70.0
George	George	294,929	5,191	56.8
Oudtshoorn	Oudtshoorn	138,257	3,540.4	39.1
Bitou	Plettenberg Bay	65,240	991.9	65.8
Knysna	Knysna	96,055	1,108.8	86.6
Total		838,457	23,331.1	35.9

== Demographics ==
The following statistics are from the 2011 Census and the 2022 Census.

=== First language (2011) ===
Language	Population	%
Afrikaans	397,462	70.8%
Xhosa	102,740	18.3%
English	42,266	7.5%
Sotho	3,412	0.6%
Tswana	2,675	0.5%
Zulu	1,960	0.3%
Sign language	1,856	0.3%
Ndebele	1,014	0.2%
Tsonga	739	0.1%
Northern Sotho	654	0.1%
Venda	527	0.1%
Swazi	296	0.1%
Other	5,687	1.0%
Total	561,288	
Not applicable	12,975	

=== Race (2022) ===
Race	Population	%
Coloured	416,542	49.7%
Black African	232,882	27.8%
White	164,589	19.6%
Indian/Asian	2,816	0.3%
Other	21,628	2.6%
Total	838,457	

=== Gender (2022) ===
Gender	Population	%
Female	431,377	51.4%
Male	407,080	48.6%
Total	838,457	

=== Age (2022) ===
Age group	Population	%
0–4	64,010	7.6%
5–14	121,769	14.5%
15–34	266,976	31.8%
35–59	261,901	31.2%
60+	123,775	14.8%
Total	838,457	

== Politics ==
The council of the Garden Route District Municipality consists of thirty-five councillors. Fourteen councillors are directly elected by party-list proportional representation, and twenty-one are appointed by the councils of the local municipalities in the district: six by George, four by Mossel Bay, three each by Oudtshoorn and Knysna, two each by Hessequa and Bitou, and one by Kannaland.

After the election of 3 August 2016 there are twenty-one councillors from the Democratic Alliance (DA), twelve from the African National Congress (ANC), and one each from the Independent Civic Organisation of South Africa (ICOSA) and the African Independent Congress (AIC).

The following table shows the detailed composition of the council.

Party	Directly elected	Appointed by local councils							Total
Party	Directly elected	Kannaland	Hessequa	Mossel Bay	George	Oudtshoorn	Bitou	Knysna	Total
DA	8	1	1	3	3	2	1	2	21
ANC	5		1	1	2	1	1	1	12
Independent Civic Organisation	1								1
AIC					1				1

The following table shows the results of the election of the fourteen directly elected councillors.

Party	Votes	Vote %	Seats
DA	106,242	53.2%	8
ANC	61,755	30.9%	5
Independent Civic Organisation	10,791	5.4%	1
VF+	3,965	2.0%	0
EFF	3,604	1.8%	0
AIC	3,380	1.7%	0
Plaaslike Besorgde Inwoners	2,592	1.3%	0
ACDP	2,439	1.2%	0
COPE	1,804	0.9%	0
South African Religious Civic Organisation	1,018	0.5%	0
South Africa Civics	858	0.4%	0
Knysna Unity Congress	525	0.3%	0
Democratic New Civic Organisation	378	0.2%	0
Christian Democrats	314	0.2%	0
George Independent Ratepayers Forum	163	0.1%	0
Total	199,828		14
Valid votes	199,828	98.1%	
Spoilt votes	3,819	1.9%	
Total votes cast	203,647		
Registered voters	326,165		
Turnout percentage	62.4%		
