= Hessequa Local Municipality =

Hessequa
- Local municipality
- Seal

- Location of Hessequa Local Municipality within the Western Cape
- Coordinates: 34°10′S 21°15′E
- Country: South Africa
- Province: Western Cape
- District: Garden Route
- Seat: Riversdale
- Wards: 9

Government
  - Type: Municipal council
  - Mayor: Grant Riddles (DA)

Area
  - Total: 5,733 km^{2} (2,214 sq mi)

Population (2022)
  - Total: 71,918
  - Density: 12.54/km^{2} (32.49/sq mi)

Racial makeup (2022)
  - Black African: 4.5%
  - Coloured: 72.5%
  - Indian/Asian: 0.3%
  - White: 22.0%

First languages (2011)
  - Afrikaans: 92.4%
  - English: 3.6%
  - Xhosa: 2.1%
  - Other: 1.9%
- Time zone: UTC+2 (SAST)
- Municipal code: WC042
- HDI (2018): 0.81 very high
- Website: www.hessequa.gov.za

Hessequa Municipality (Afrikaans: Hessequa Munisipaliteit), known before 24 June 2005 as Langeberg Municipality, is a local municipality within the Garden Route District Municipality, in the Western Cape province of South Africa. It is flanked by the lower Breede River to the west and the Gourits River to the east. As of 2022, the population was 71,918. Its municipality code is WC042. The name Hessequa, meaning "people of the trees", refers to the indigenous Khoikhoi people.

== Geography ==
The municipality covers an area of 5,733 square kilometres (2,214 sq mi) between the Langeberg mountains and the Indian Ocean, stretching from the Breede River in the west to the Gourits River in the east. It abuts on the Swellendam Municipality to the west, the Kannaland Municipality to the north, the Oudtshoorn Municipality to the northeast, and the Mossel Bay Municipality to the east.

The largest town in the municipality is Riversdale, which had a population of 16,176 in 2011. It’s also where the municipal headquarters are located. Riversdale sits on the Vet River near the foothills of the Langeberg. To the west are Heidelberg (8,259) and Slangrivier (3,011), while Albertinia (6,372) lies to the east. Stilbaai (3,514) is on the coast south of Riversdale, at the mouth of the Vet River, with the smaller communities of Jongensfontein (355) and Melkhoutfontein (2,533) nearby. Vermaaklikheid (365), a small rural village known for its natural surroundings, is located south of Riversdale along the Duiwenhoks River. On the edges of the municipality, Witsand (321) sits at the mouth of the Breede River in the west, and Gouritsmond (515) lies at the mouth of the Gourits River in the east.

== History ==
At the end of the apartheid era, the area that is today the Hessequa Municipality formed part of the South Cape Regional Services Council (RSC). The towns of Riversdale, Heidelberg, Albertinia and Stilbaai were governed by municipal councils elected by their white residents. The coloured residents of Riversdale, Heidelberg and Theronsville (Albertinia) were governed by management committees subordinate to the white councils. The seaside resorts of Witsand, Jongensfontein and Gouritsmond were governed by elected local councils, and the town of Slangrivier was governed by a board of management.

While the negotiations to end apartheid were taking place a process was established for local authorities to agree on voluntary mergers. In March 1992, the Municipality of Riversdale and the Riversdale Management Committee merged into a single municipal council, and in August 1992 a similar merger took place in Heidelberg.

After the national elections of 1994 a process of local government transformation began, in which negotiations were held between the existing local authorities, political parties, and local community organisations. As a result of these negotiations, the existing local authorities were dissolved and transitional local councils (TLCs) were created for each town and village. The smaller seaside resorts were also combined with larger towns.

- Riversdale TLC replaced the Municipality of Riversdale in October 1994.
- Heidelberg TLC replaced the Municipality of Heidelberg and the Witsand Local Council in December 1994.
- Albertinia-Gourits TLC replaced the Municipality of Albertinia, the Theronsville Management Committee and the Gouritsmond Local Council in January 1995.
- Stilbaai TLC replaced the Municipality of Stilbaai and the Jongensfontein Local Council in January 1995.
- Slangrivier TLC replaced the Slangrivier Management Board in January 1995.

The transitional councils were initially made up of members nominated by the various parties to the negotiations, until May 1996 when elections were held. At the time of these elections the Albertinia-Gourits TLC was dissolved and replaced by separate TLCs for Albertinia and Gouritsmond. The South Cape District Council was established in place of the South Cape RSC, and transitional representative councils (TRCs) were elected to represent rural areas outside the TLCs on the District Council. The area that was to become Hessequa Municipality formed part of the Langeberg TRC.

At the local elections of December 2000 the TLCs and TRCs were dissolved and the Langeberg Municipality was established as a single local authority. At the same election the South Cape District Council was also dissolved and replaced by the Eden District Municipality. In 2005 the name of the local municipality was changed from Langeberg to Hessequa. (The Langeberg name was subsequently reused for the municipality formerly known as Breede River/Winelands.)

== Demographics ==
According to the 2022 census, the municipality had a population of 71,918 people, increasing at an annual rate of 3.2% from 2011. Of these, 72.5% identified as "Coloured," 22% as "White," and 4.5% as "Black African."

== Politics ==
The municipal council consists of seventeen members elected by mixed-member proportional representation. Nine councillors are elected by first-past-the-post voting in nine wards, while the remaining eight are chosen from party lists so that the total number of party representatives is proportional to the number of votes received.

In the election of 4 November 2026 the Democratic Alliance (DA) won a majority of seats on the council.

The following table shows the results of the 2026 election.

Party	Ward			List			Total seats
Party	Votes	%	Seats	Votes	%	Seats	Total seats
Democratic Alliance	11,951	51.71	6	11,836	51.22	3	9
African National Congress	4,957	21.45	3	4,888	21.15	1	4
Patriotic Alliance	2,821	12.21	0	2,930	12.68	2	2
Freedom Front Plus	2,244	9.71	0	2,379	10.30	2	2
10 other parties	1,137	4.92	0	1,073	4.64	0	0
Total	23,110	100.00	9	23,106	100.00	8	17
Valid votes	23,110	99.37		23,106	99.37		
Invalid/blank votes	146	0.63		147	0.63		
Total votes	23,256	100.00		23,253	100.00		
Registered voters/turnout	37,013	62.83		37,013	62.82		
