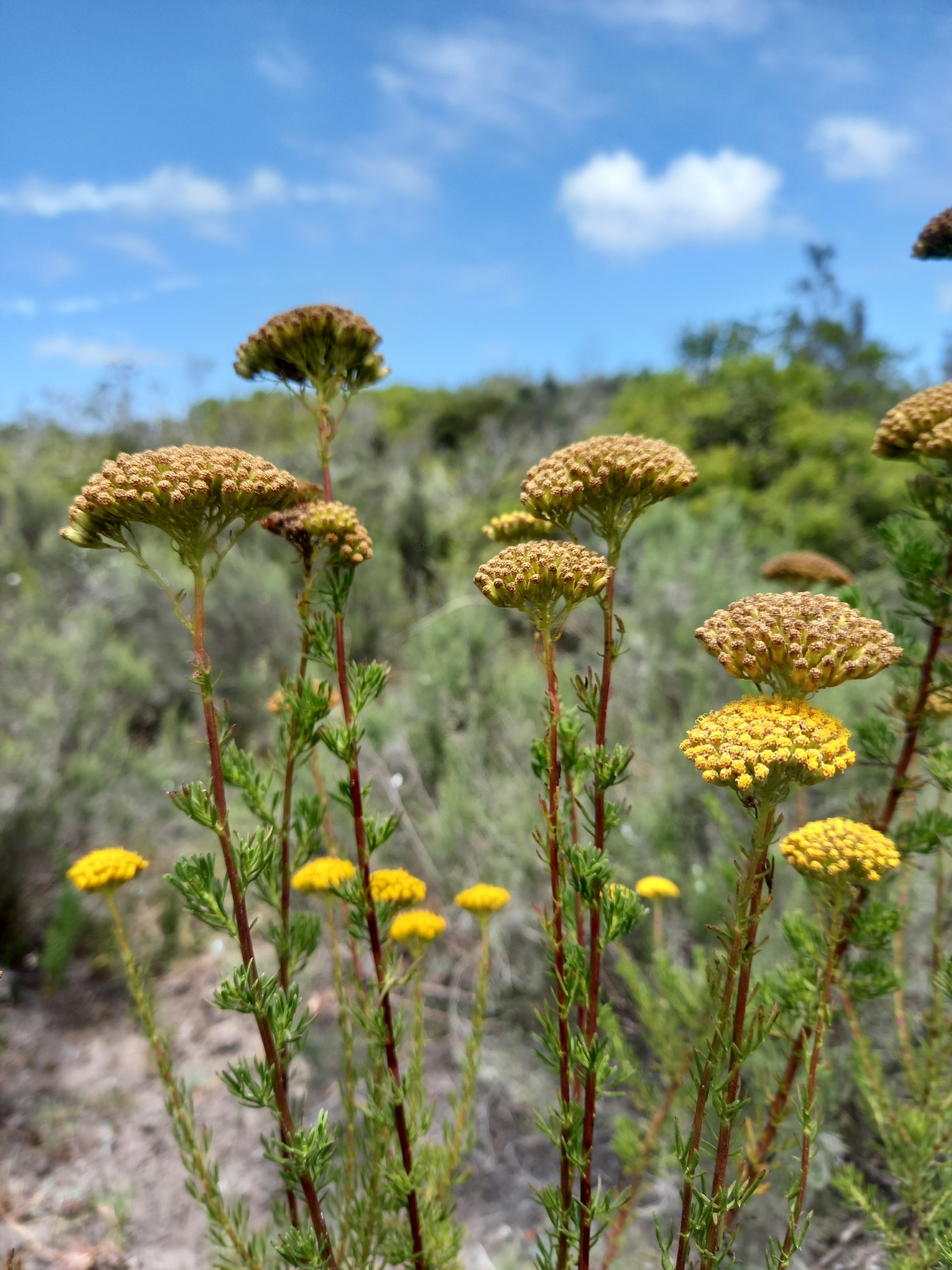

Scientific classification
- Kingdom: Plantae
- Clade: Tracheophytes
- Clade: Angiosperms
- Clade: Eudicots
- Clade: Asterids
- Order: Asterales
- Family: Asteraceae
- Genus: Athanasia
- Species: A. pectinata

Binomial name
- Athanasia pectinata L.f.

Synonyms
- Morysia lineariloba DC.

= Athanasia pectinata =

Species of South African plant

Athanasia pectinata is a species of plant from the Western Cape of South Africa.

== Description ==
This shrublet grows up to 1.2 m (3.9 ft) tall. It has few branches. Each of the pinnatisect (split into sections nearly to the midrib, not quite forming leaflets) leaves has 3-5 lobes. Solitary disc shaped flower heads are crowded in terminal compound inflorescences at the ends of branches. They are yellow in colour and are present between October and December.

== Distribution and habitat ==
This plant is endemic to South Africa. It grows in the Western Cape, where it is found on damp clay soils between Hermanus and Gouritsmond.

== Conservation ==
This species is common and is considered to be of least concern by the South African National Biodiversity Institute.
