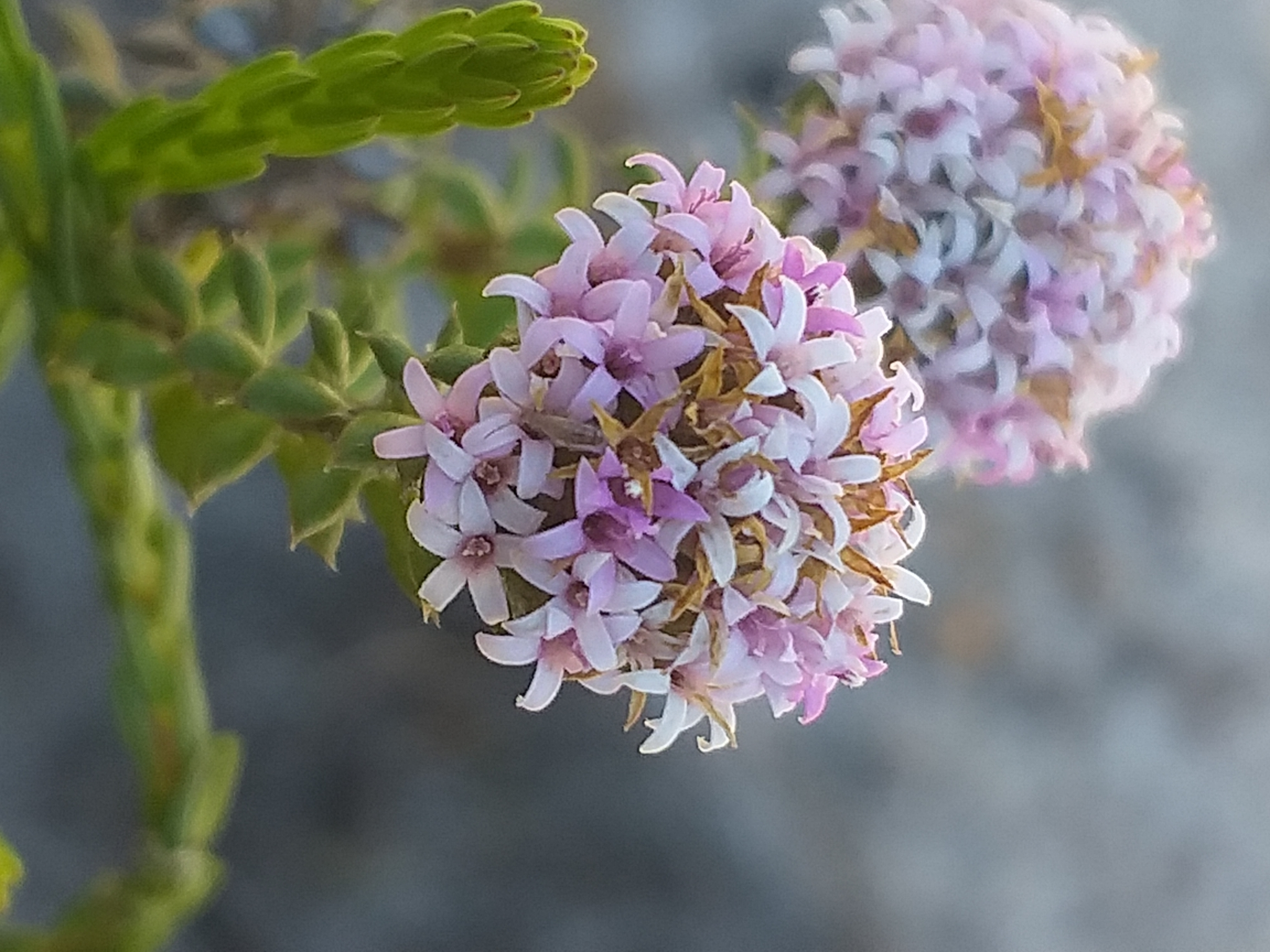

Scientific classification
- Kingdom: Plantae
- Clade: Tracheophytes
- Clade: Angiosperms
- Clade: Eudicots
- Clade: Asterids
- Order: Asterales
- Family: Asteraceae
- Genus: Stoebe
- Species: S. cyathuloides

Binomial name
- Stoebe cyathuloides Schltr.

Synonyms
- Stoebe humilis Levyns; Stoebe sphaerocephala Schltr.

= Stoebe cyathuloides =

Species of plant

Stoebe cyathuloides is a shrub belonging to the Asteraceae family. The species is endemic to the Western Cape and is part of the fynbos. The plant occurs from the Cape Peninsula to Albertinia.
