= Olifants River (Southern Cape) =

River in the Western Cape, South Africa

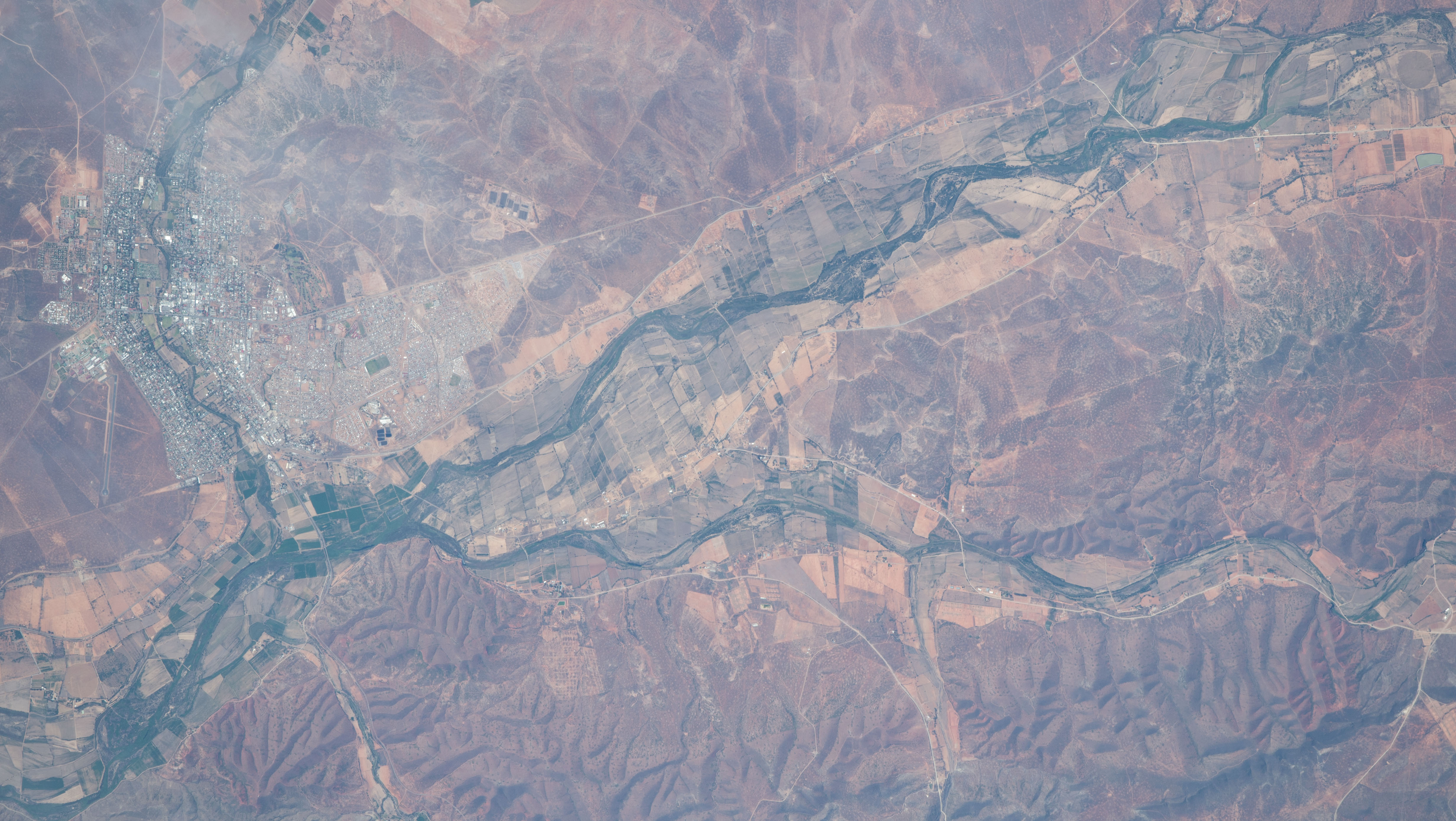

- Location of the Olifants River mouth
- Etymology: From the word for "elephant" in the Afrikaans language

Location
- Country: South Africa
- State: Western Cape Province

Physical characteristics
- Source: North of the Swartberg
  - coordinates: 32°11′S 22°35′E
  - elevation: 1,400 m (4,600 ft)
- Mouth: Gourits River
  - coordinates: 33°40′55″S 21°42′58″E
  - elevation: 516 m (1,693 ft)

The Olifants River (Afrikaans: Olifantsrivier) is a river in the Klein Karoo area of the Western Cape, South Africa.

== Course ==
It has its origins in the Traka and Kalkwal Rivers north of the Swartberg, becoming the Olifants River after flowing through the Toorwaterpoort, flowing west through Oudtshoorn and joining the Gamka River to form the Gourits River, then heading south to its mouth at Gouritsmond in the southern coast of the Western Cape.

The northern tributaries of the Olifants River rise in the Great Karoo to the north of the Swartberg Mountains, while the Olifants River itself rises to the east and flows westwards between the Swartberg and Kammanassie mountains to its confluence with the Gamka River. The southern slopes of the Swartberg Mountains are drained by the perennial Groot River, Kango River, Grobbelaars River, Wynands River, Kansa River and Vlei River tributaries, which flow into the Olifants River. The Kammanassie River rises in the Outeniqua and Kammanassie mountains near Uniondale and joins the Olifants River upstream of Oudtshoorn.

== Dams in the Olifants River ==
- Stompdrift Dam (capacity 55,300,000 cubic metres (1.95×10^{9} cu ft)),
- Kammanassie Dam (capacity 35,800,000 cubic metres (1.26×10^{9} cu ft)),
- Koos Raubenheimer (capacity 9,200,000 cubic metres (320,000,000 cu ft)),
- Melville Dam (capacity 400,000 cubic metres (14,000,000 cu ft)).

== See also ==
- List of rivers of South Africa
