= Stoebe rugulosa =

Scientific classification
- Kingdom: Plantae
- Clade: Tracheophytes
- Clade: Angiosperms
- Clade: Eudicots
- Clade: Asterids
- Order: Asterales
- Family: Asteraceae
- Genus: Stoebe
- Species: S. rugulosa

Binomial name
- Stoebe rugulosa Harv.

Species of plant

Stoebe rugulosa is a shrub belonging to the Asteraceae family. The species is endemic to the Western Cape and is part of the fynbos and renosterveld. It occurs from Caledon to Albertinia and has a range of 5000 km² where there are five subpopulations. The plant has lost more than 70% of its habitat to the cultivation of wheat over the past 80 years. It is also threatened by invasive plants.
