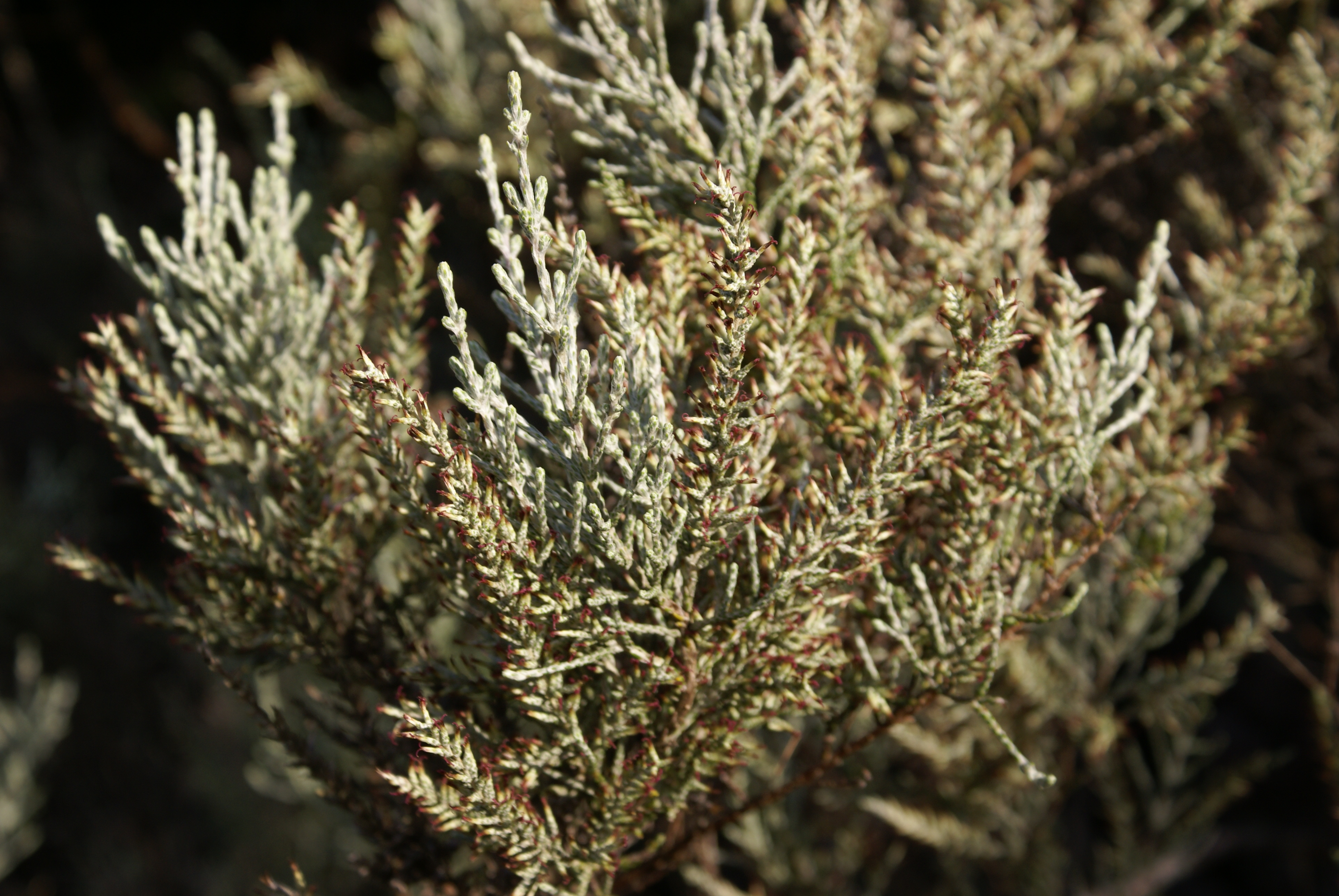
- Stoebe passerinoides

Scientific classification
- Kingdom: Plantae
- Clade: Tracheophytes
- Clade: Angiosperms
- Clade: Eudicots
- Clade: Asterids
- Order: Asterales
- Family: Asteraceae
- Subfamily: Asteroideae
- Tribe: Gnaphalieae
- Genus: Stoebe; L.

Type species
- Stoebe aethiopica L.

Synonyms
- Gymnachaena Rchb. ex DC.; Perotriche Cass.; Seriphium L.

= Stoebe =

Genus of plants

Stoebe is a genus of plants in the tribe Gnaphalieae within the family Asteraceae. The genus is confined to the Cape Provinces of South Africa.

Species

- Stoebe aethiopica
- Stoebe alopecuroides
- Stoebe capitata
- Stoebe cryptophylla
- Stoebe cyathuloides
- Stoebe fusca
- Stoebe gomphrenoides
- Stoebe kilimandscharica
- Stoebe leucocephala
- Stoebe microphylla
- Stoebe montana
- Stoebe muirii
- Stoebe nervigera
- Stoebe pachyclada
- Stoebe passerinoides
- Stoebe phyllostachya
- Stoebe plumosa
- Stoebe prostrata
- Stoebe rosea
- Stoebe rugulosa
- Stoebe schultzii

formerly included

A few dozen species now regarded as members of other genera: Dicerothamnus Dolichothrix Disparago Gongyloglossa Helichrysum Metalasia Myrovernix Seriphium Trichogyne
