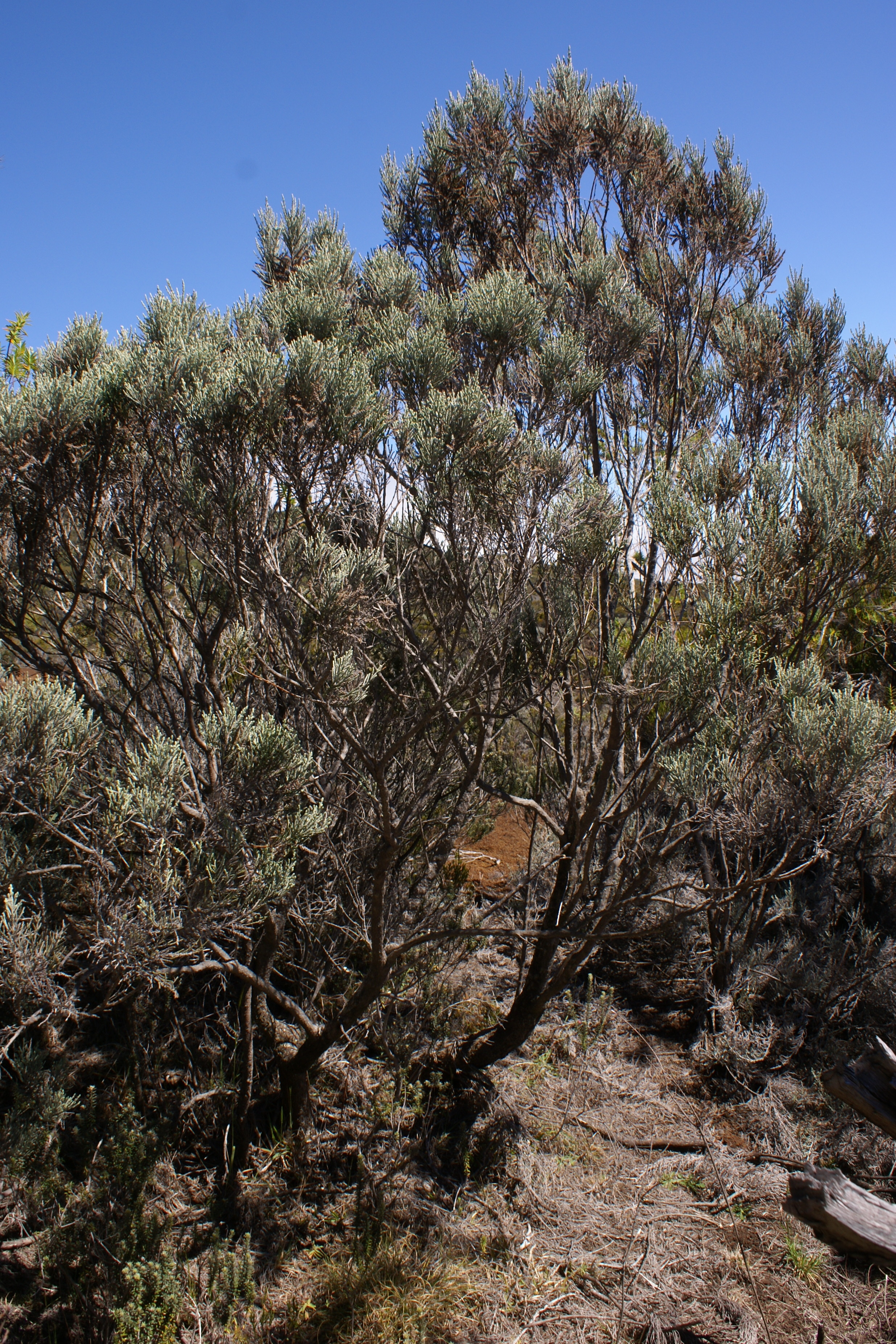

Scientific classification
- Kingdom: Plantae
- Clade: Tracheophytes
- Clade: Angiosperms
- Clade: Eudicots
- Clade: Asterids
- Order: Asterales
- Family: Asteraceae
- Genus: Stoebe
- Species: S. passerinoides

Binomial name
- Stoebe passerinoides (Lam.) Willd.

Synonyms
- Stoebe paniculata Cass. Artemisia fruticans Comm. ex DC. Seriphium passerinoides (Lam.)

= Stoebe passerinoides =

Species of plant

Stoebe passerinoides, synonym Seriphium passerinoides, is a species of flowering plant belongs to the family Asteraceae. The species is endemic to the island of Réunion. It was first described by Jean-Baptiste de Lamarck.
