= Gourits River =

River in the Western Cape, South Africa

Gourits River Gouritz River, Gouritsrivier
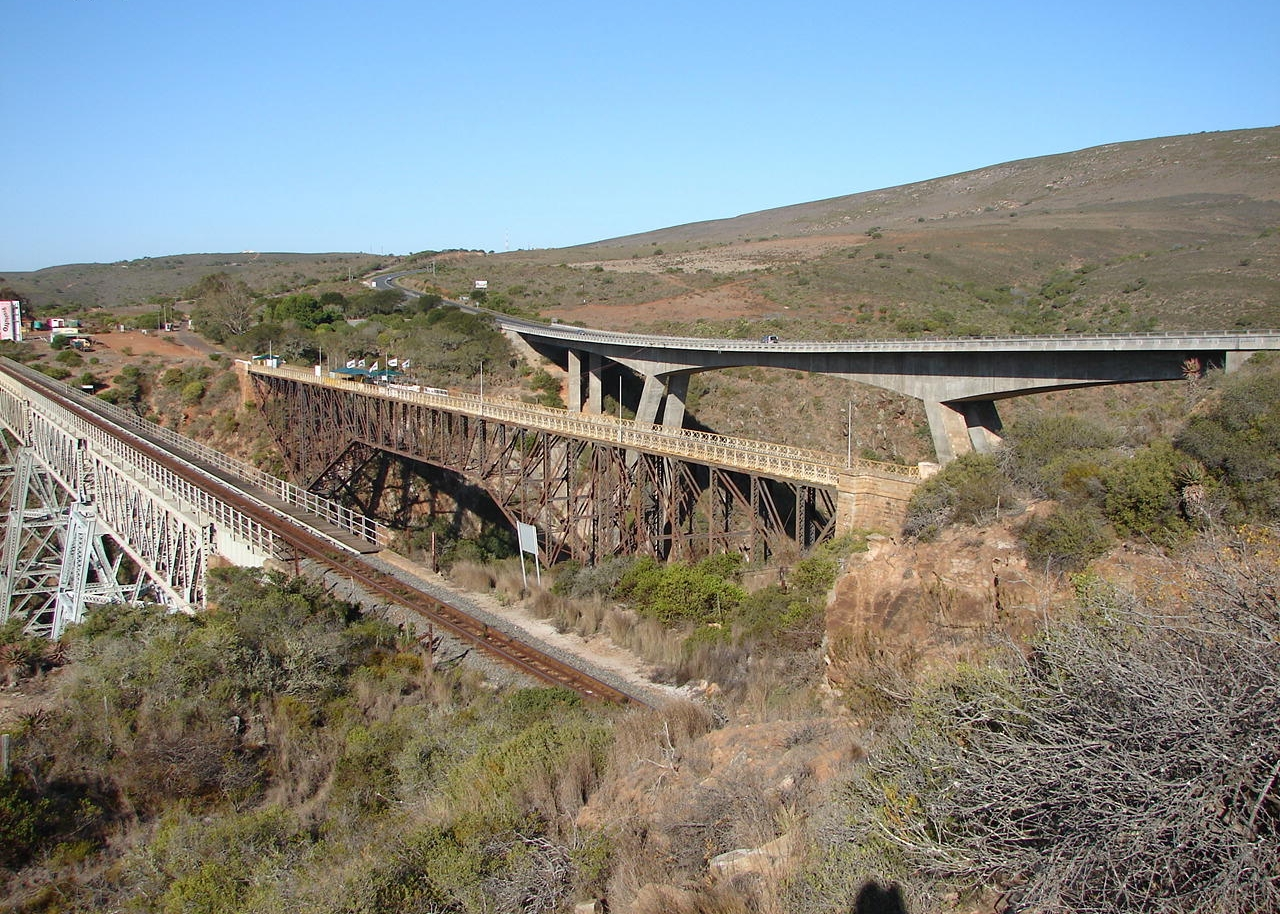
- The Gourits River's triple bridges near Albertinia, Western Cape

- Location of the Gourits River mouth
- Etymology: Origin uncertain; perhaps from the word "dirty" in the Griqua language
- Native name: Rio das Vaccas (Afrikaans)

Location
- Country: South Africa
- Province: Western Cape Province

Physical characteristics
- Source confluence: Gamka (W); Olifants(E)
  - coordinates: 33°40′57″S 21°42′58″E
  - elevation: 516 m (1,693 ft)
- Mouth: Gourits Estuary
  - location: Indian Ocean, Near Gouritsmond
  - coordinates: 34°20′47″S 21°53′08″E
  - elevation: 0 m (0 ft)
- Length: 416 km (258 mi)
- Basin size: 45,715 km^{2} (17,651 sq mi)

Gourits River (Afrikaans: Gouritsrivier), sometimes spelled 'Gouritz River', is situated in the Western Cape, South Africa.

The Gourits River flows from the confluence of the Gamka River and Olifants River and is joined by the Groot River, before flowing through the Langeberg Mountains and coastal plain. It eventually drains into the sea through the Gourits Estuary near Gouritsmond.

== See also ==
- List of rivers of South Africa
- List of estuaries of South Africa
- List of reservoirs and dams in South Africa
