= Stoebe cryptophylla =

Scientific classification
- Kingdom: Plantae
- Clade: Tracheophytes
- Clade: Angiosperms
- Clade: Eudicots
- Clade: Asterids
- Order: Asterales
- Family: Asteraceae
- Genus: Stoebe
- Species: S. cryptophylla

Binomial name
- Stoebe cryptophylla Baker

Synonyms
- Stoebe cryptophyllum (Baker) Koek. Stoebe biotoides Baker

Species of plant

Stoebe cryptophylla is a species of flowering plant belonging to the family Asteraceae. It was first described by John Gilbert Baker.
