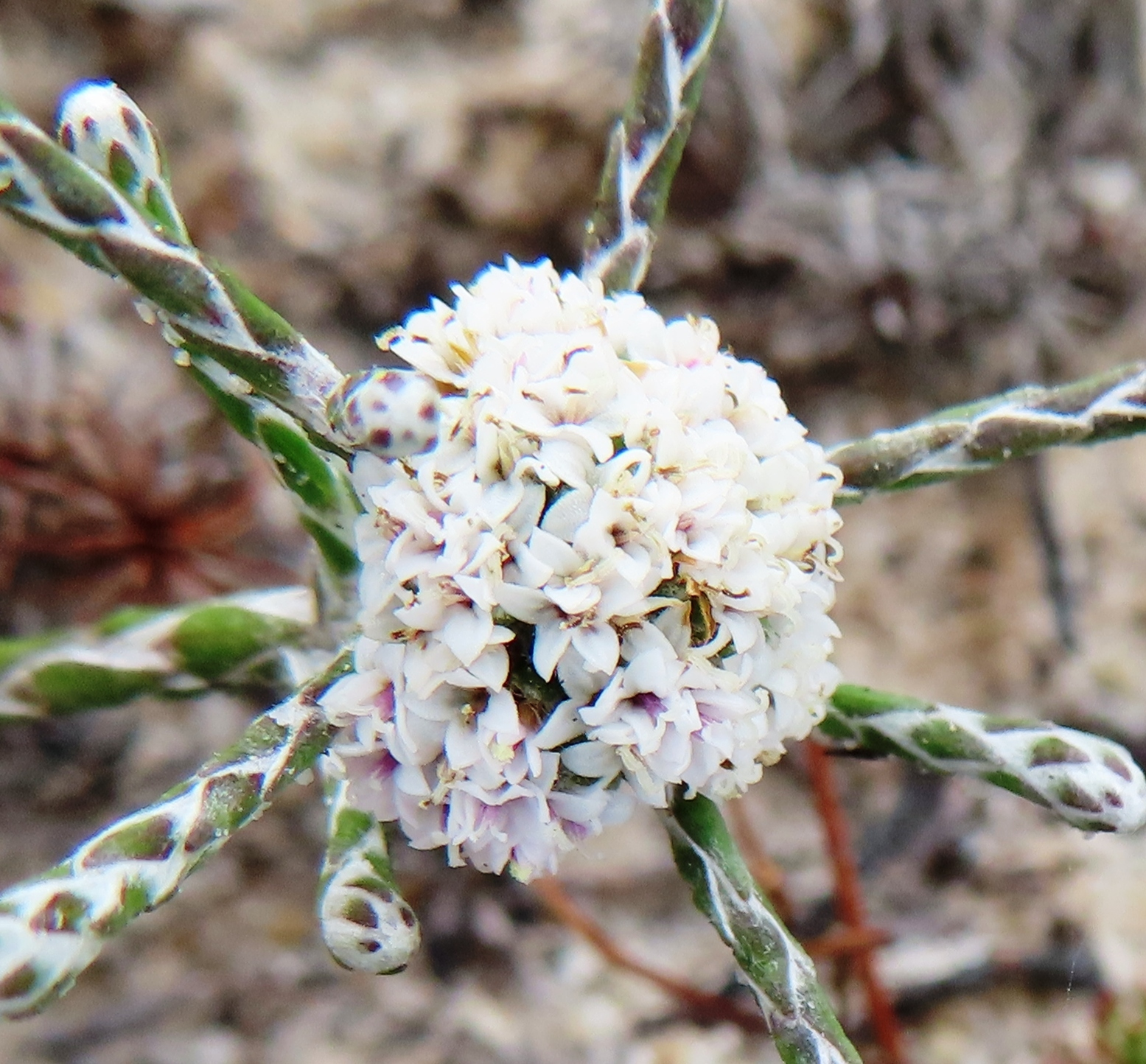

Scientific classification
- Kingdom: Plantae
- Clade: Embryophytes
- Clade: Tracheophytes
- Clade: Spermatophytes
- Clade: Angiosperms
- Clade: Eudicots
- Clade: Asterids
- Order: Asterales
- Family: Asteraceae
- Genus: Stoebe
- Species: S. schultzii

Binomial name
- Stoebe schultzii Levyns

Synonyms
- Perotriche microphylla Sch.Bip.; Stoebe salteri Levyns

= Stoebe schultzii =

Species of plant

Stoebe schultzii is a shrub belonging to the Asteraceae family. The species is endemic to the Western Cape and is part of the fynbos. The plant occurs from Caledon to Gansbaai and De Hoop and there are less than ten subpopulations. The plant has a range of 2 145 km². It is threatened by invasive plants, coastal development and agricultural cultivation.
