= Stoebe gomphrenoides =

Scientific classification
- Kingdom: Plantae
- Clade: Tracheophytes
- Clade: Angiosperms
- Clade: Eudicots
- Clade: Asterids
- Order: Asterales
- Family: Asteraceae
- Genus: Stoebe
- Species: S. gomphrenoides

Binomial name
- Stoebe gomphrenoides P.J.Bergius

Synonyms
- Seriphium gomphrenoides (P.J.Bergius) Lam.; Stoebe ramosissima Sch.Bip.; Stoebe stenostachya Sch.Bip.; Stoebe subulata Sm.

Species of plant

Stoebe gomphrenoides is a shrub belonging to the Asteraceae family. The species is endemic to the Western Cape and is part of the fynbos and renosterveld. The plant occurs from Malmesbury to Pella and has a range of 94 km². The species is constantly losing habitat to invasive plants and suburban development.
