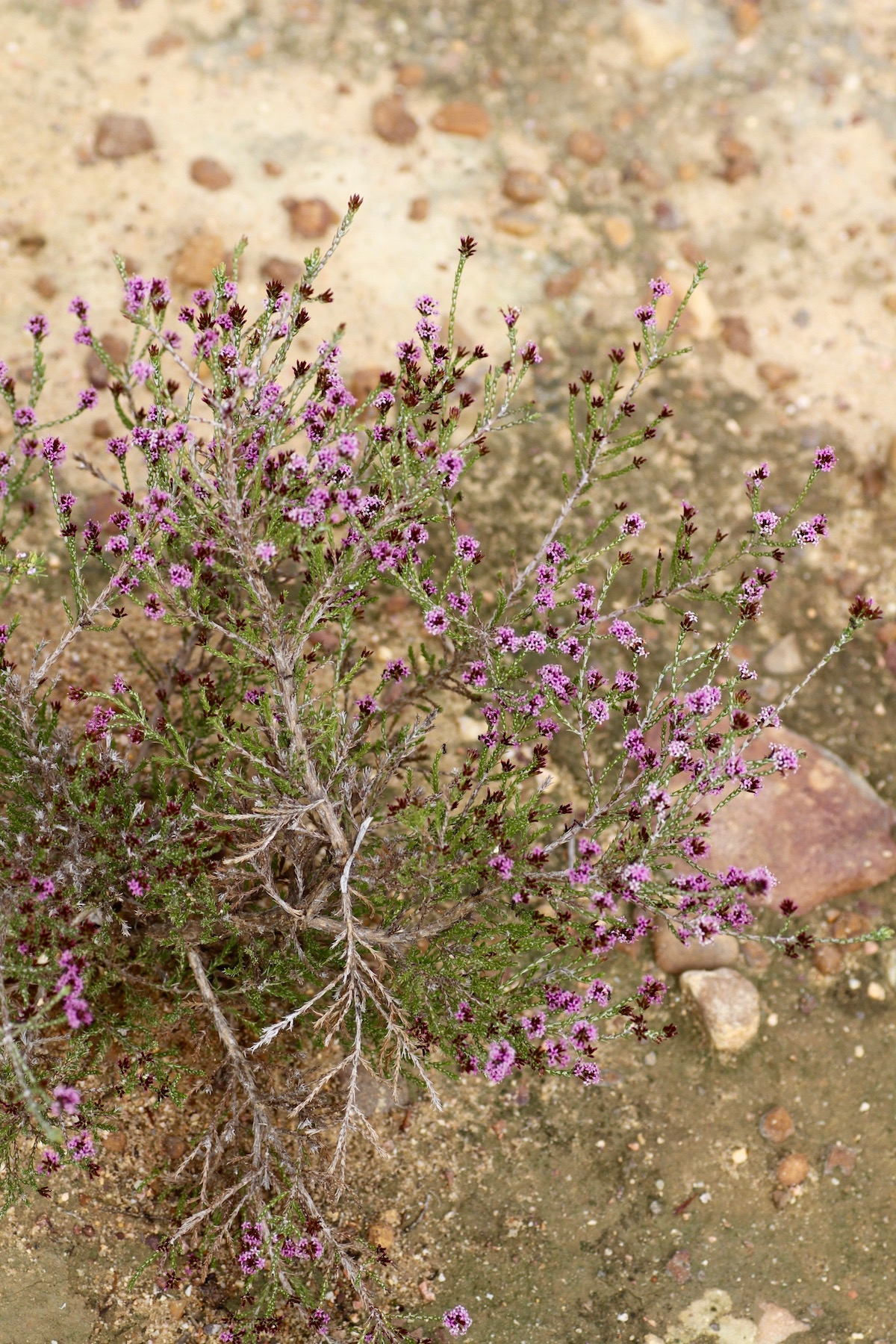

Scientific classification
- Kingdom: Plantae
- Clade: Tracheophytes
- Clade: Angiosperms
- Clade: Eudicots
- Clade: Asterids
- Order: Asterales
- Family: Asteraceae
- Genus: Stoebe
- Species: S. fusca

Binomial name
- Stoebe fusca (L.) Thunb.

Synonyms
- Achyrocline tamariscina Schrank; Seriphium fuscum L.

= Stoebe fusca =

Species of plant

Stoebe fusca is a shrub belonging to the Asteraceae family. The species is endemic to the Northern Cape and Western Cape and is part of the fynbos. It occurs from the Bokkeveldberge escarpment and the Hantam Karoo southwards to Bredasdorp.
