= Stoebe kilimandscharica =

Scientific classification
- Kingdom: Plantae
- Clade: Tracheophytes
- Clade: Angiosperms
- Clade: Eudicots
- Clade: Asterids
- Order: Asterales
- Family: Asteraceae
- Genus: Stoebe
- Species: S. kilimandscharica

Binomial name
- Stoebe kilimandscharica O.Hoffm.

Synonyms
- Stoebe kilimandscharicum (O.Hoffm.) Koek. Stoebe elgonensis Mattf.

Species of plant

Stoebe kilimandscharica is a species of flowering plant belonging to the family Asteraceae. It generally grows up to 2 m (6 ft 7 in) tall.
