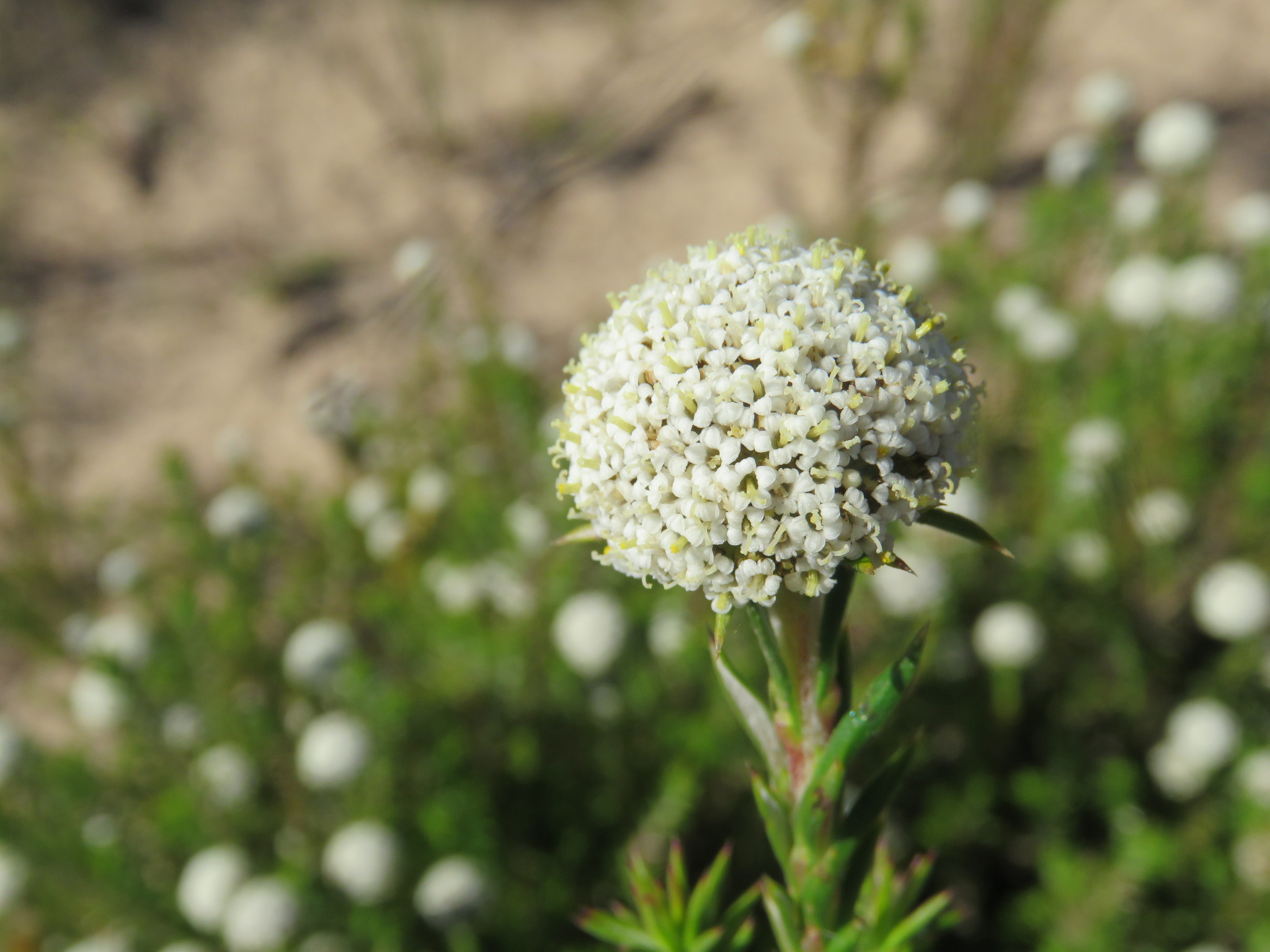

Scientific classification
- Kingdom: Plantae
- Clade: Tracheophytes
- Clade: Angiosperms
- Clade: Eudicots
- Clade: Asterids
- Order: Asterales
- Family: Asteraceae
- Genus: Stoebe
- Species: S. aethiopica

Binomial name
- Stoebe aethiopica L.

Synonyms
- Seriphium aethiopicum Steud.; Seriphium juniperifolium Lam.; Seriphium phylicoides Pers.; Stoebe phylicoides Thunb.; Selago spinosa Burm.f.

= Stoebe aethiopica =

Species of plant

Stoebe aethiopica is a shrub belonging to the Asteraceae family. The species is endemic to the Northern Cape, Eastern Cape and Western Cape and is part of the fynbos.
