= Gouritz River Bridge =

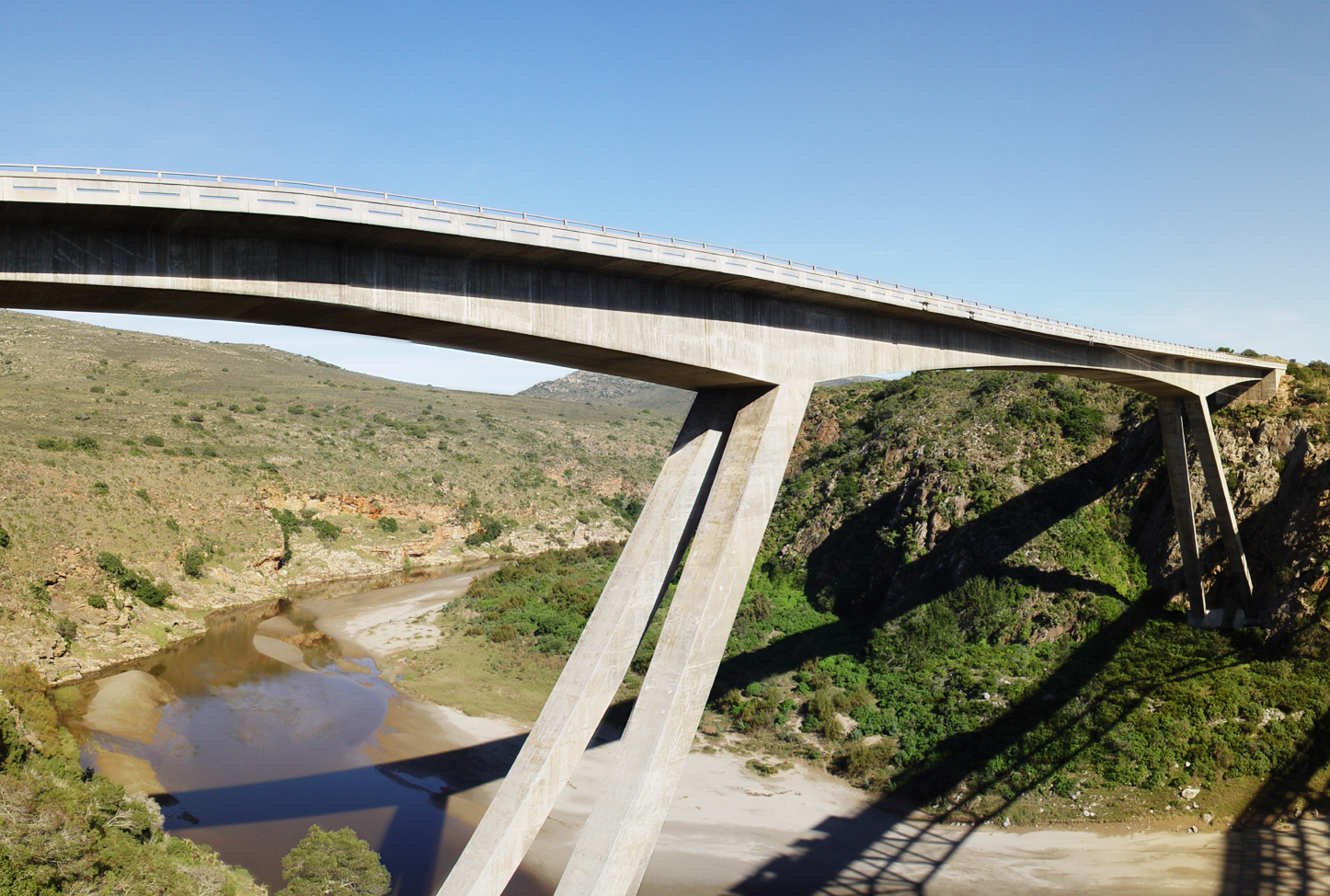
- Coordinates: 34.1859°S 21.7529°E
- Carries: Road and pedestrian traffic
- Crosses: Gouritz River
- Locale: Mossel Bay

Characteristics
- Design: Liebenberg+Stander
- Total length: 270 metres (890 ft)
- Width: 13.98 metres (45.9 ft)
- Height: 61
- Longest span: 105 metres (344 ft)

History
- Constructed by: Murray & Roberts Construction Concor
- Opened: 1978

The Gouritz River Bridge on the N2 route between Cape Town and Port Elizabeth is a rigid-frame bridge which crosses the Gouritz River 34 kilometres (21 mi) west of Mossel Bay in the Western Cape.

== Structural design ==
The total length of the deck is 270 metres (890 ft) and consists of four spans. A prominent feature of the bridge is the main span which is 105 metres (344 ft) long supported by two pairs of diagonal reinforced concrete struts founded on abutments 170 metres (560 ft). The reinforced concrete deck together with two pairs of inclined supports at eastern and western sides of the river form a rigid frame structure. The two spans on the eastern side have a total length of 110 metres (360 ft) and this section of deck is supported by vertical columns 45m from the end. The deck superstructure consists of a continuous prestressed concrete box girder with deck slabs cantilevered laterally to design width.

== Gallery ==
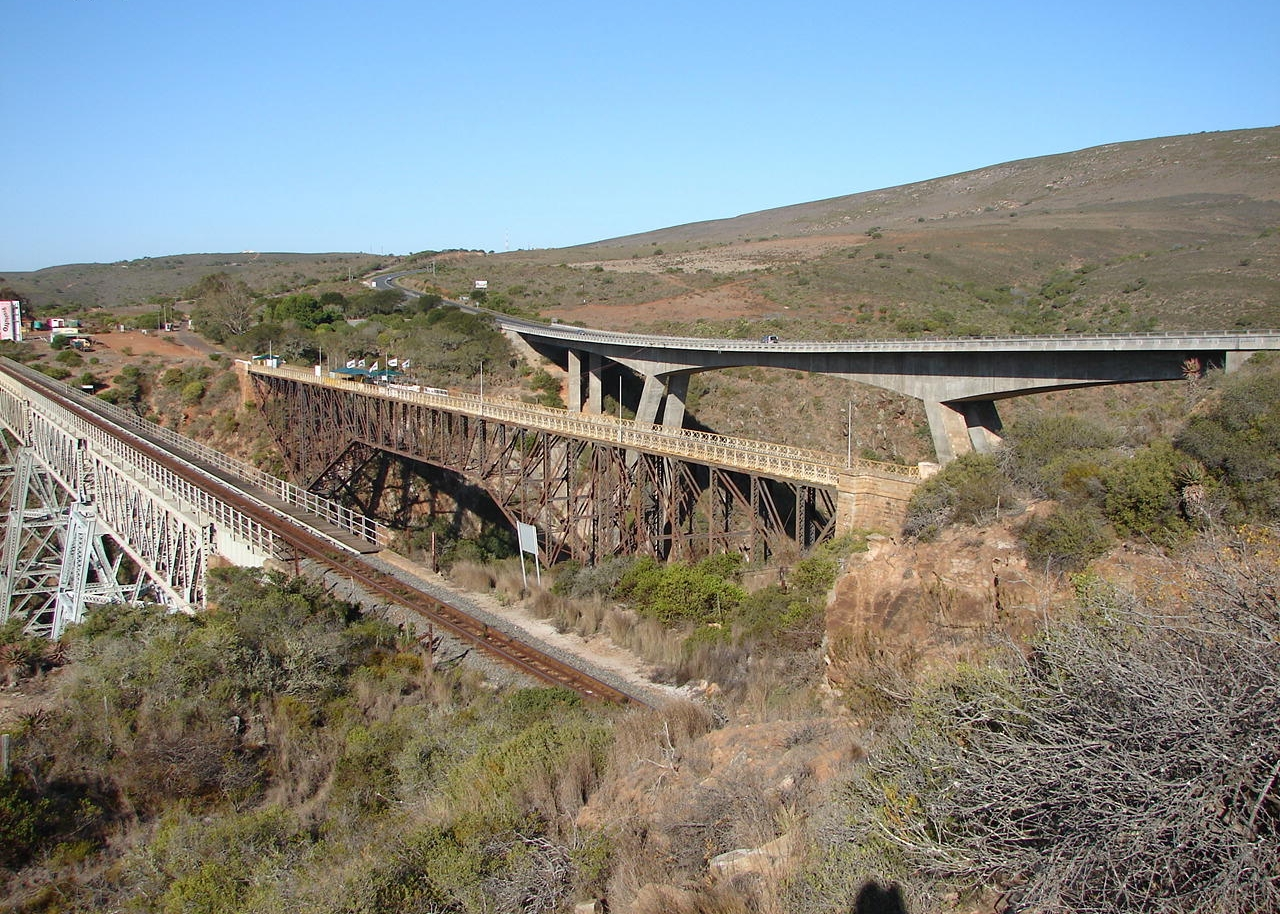
