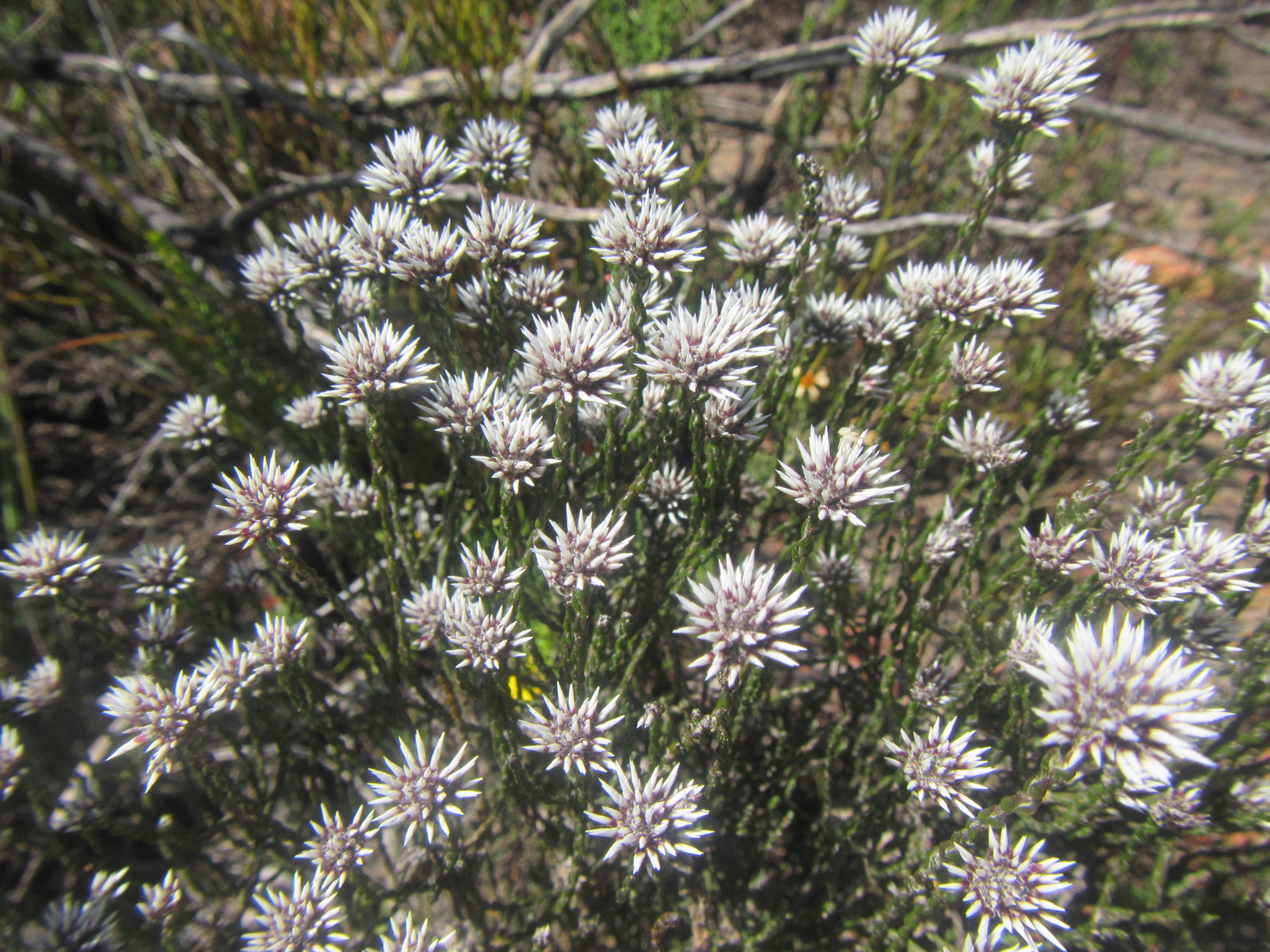

Scientific classification
- Kingdom: Plantae
- Clade: Embryophytes
- Clade: Tracheophytes
- Clade: Angiosperms
- Clade: Eudicots
- Clade: Asterids
- Order: Asterales
- Family: Asteraceae
- Genus: Stoebe
- Species: S. microphylla

Binomial name
- Stoebe microphylla DC.

= Stoebe microphylla =

Species of plant

Stoebe microphylla is a shrub belonging to the Asteraceae family. The species is endemic to the Eastern Cape and the Western Cape and is part of the fynbos. The plant occurs from Malmesbury to Nieuwoudtville.
