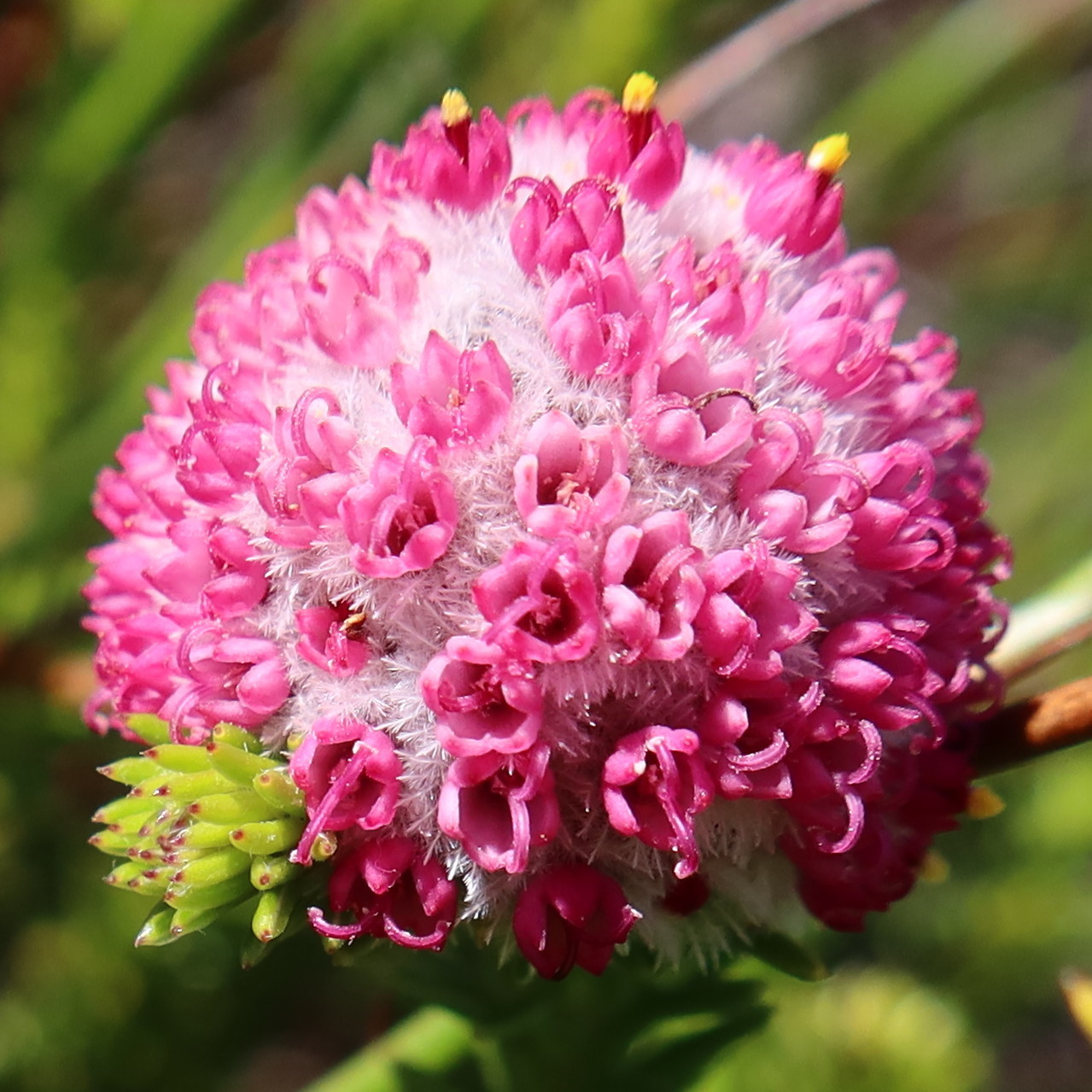

Scientific classification
- Kingdom: Plantae
- Clade: Tracheophytes
- Clade: Angiosperms
- Clade: Eudicots
- Clade: Asterids
- Order: Asterales
- Family: Asteraceae
- Genus: Stoebe
- Species: S. rosea

Binomial name
- Stoebe rosea Wolley-Dod

Synonyms
- Stoebe pentheri O.Hoffm.

= Stoebe rosea =

Species of plant

Stoebe rosea is a shrub belonging to the Asteraceae family. The species is endemic to the Western Cape and is part of the fynbos. The plant occurs in the Cape Peninsula on the southern slopes. It has an area of occurrence of 88 km² and falls under the protection of the Table Mountain National Park. The plant is considered rare.
