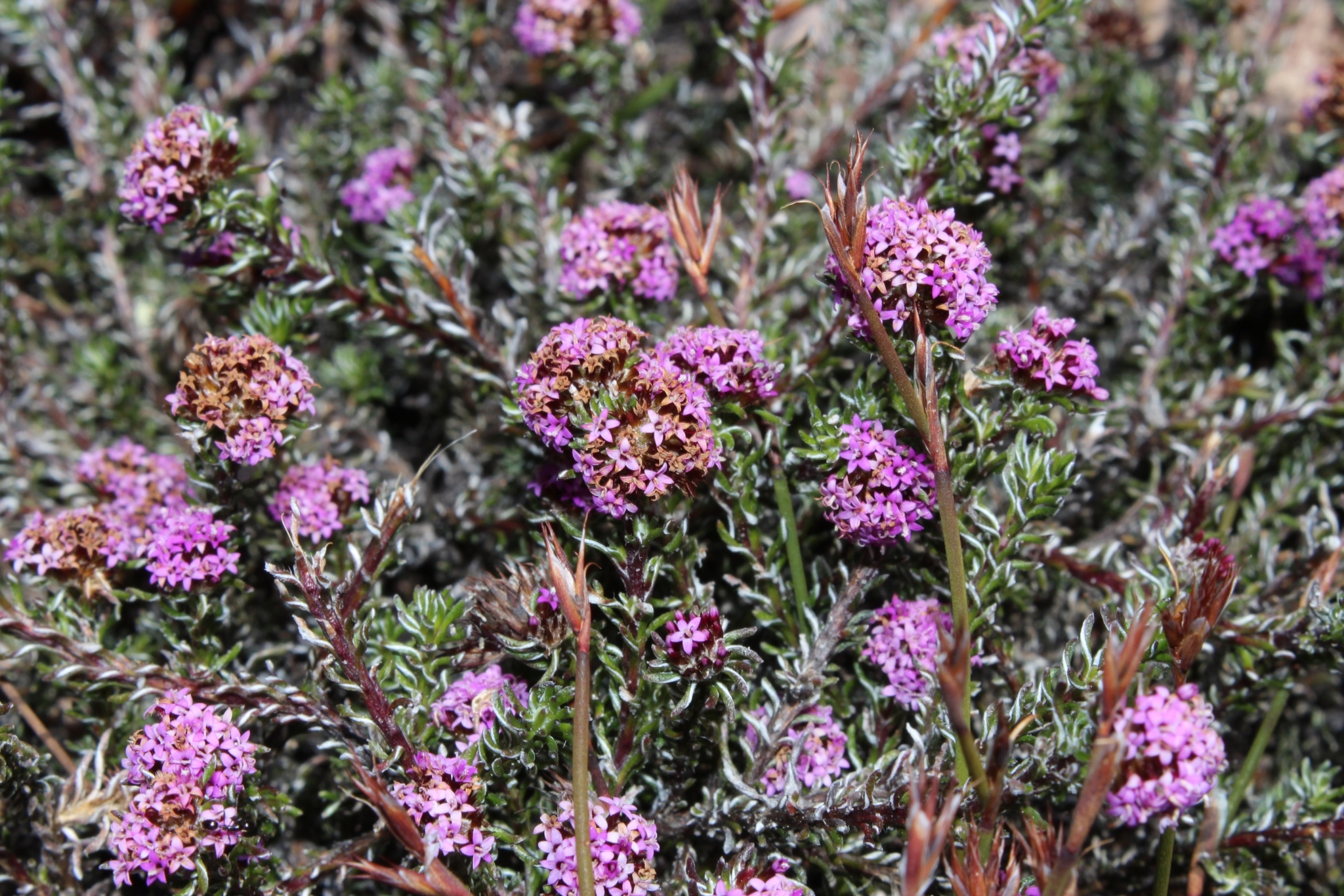

Scientific classification
- Kingdom: Plantae
- Clade: Embryophytes
- Clade: Tracheophytes
- Clade: Spermatophytes
- Clade: Angiosperms
- Clade: Eudicots
- Clade: Asterids
- Order: Asterales
- Family: Asteraceae
- Genus: Stoebe
- Species: S. montana

Binomial name
- Stoebe montana Schltr. ex Levyns

= Stoebe montana =

Species of plant

Stoebe montana is a shrub belonging to the Asteraceae family. The species is endemic to the Western Cape and is part of the fynbos. The plant occurs on Gydoberg and the Matroosberg and there are three subpopulations. The plant has a range of 60 km² and is considered rare.
