= Athanasia grandiceps =

Scientific classification
- Kingdom: Plantae
- Clade: Tracheophytes
- Clade: Angiosperms
- Clade: Eudicots
- Clade: Asterids
- Order: Asterales
- Family: Asteraceae
- Genus: Athanasia
- Species: A. grandiceps

Binomial name
- Athanasia grandiceps Hilliard & B.L.Burtt

South African plant species

Athanasia grandiceps is a species of plant from South Africa. It belongs to the daisy family.

== Description ==
This sparsely branched shrub grows 50–150 cm (1.6–4.9 ft) tall. Plants will often have many tufted secondary shoots. The hairs are long and simple. The leaves grow directly on the stems and do not have a stalk. The deeply pinnatifid (cleft nearly to the midrib, not quite dividing into individual leaflets) or bipinnatifid leaves have long, narrow lobes. The upper leaves are often entire with long, simple hairs.

Flowers are present in May. The flowers are borne in long-stalked disc-shaped dense, flat clusters. The stalk is expanded and hollow at the top. The whorls of bracts surrounding the flowers are bell-shaped. The overlapping bracts are narrow and straw-coloured with margins that are fringed by hairs. The disc (inner) florets are yellow. They are tubular below and bell-shaped above and have scattered, long-stalked glands on the corolla tube. The florets do not have paleae (the upper bracts of grass florets). The pappus (a feathery modified calyx) is absent.

The fruit are cup-shaped and contain a single dry seed. It has ten to twelve ribs, although twelve ribs are most common. It has a minute rim at the top.

== Distribution and habitat ==
While most of the species in this genus are found in the south-west parts of South Africa, this species is endemic to KwaZulu-Natal. It grows on afro-alpine grassland slopes on the Drakensberg Mountains, where it has an area of occurrence of less than 100 km^{2} (39 sq mi).

== Conservation ==
This species is considered to be rare by the South African National Biodiversity Institute. While the population is stable, it is a highly range restricted species known from only three sites.
