= Stoebe muirii =

Scientific classification
- Kingdom: Plantae
- Clade: Tracheophytes
- Clade: Angiosperms
- Clade: Eudicots
- Clade: Asterids
- Order: Asterales
- Family: Asteraceae
- Genus: Stoebe
- Species: S. muirii

Binomial name
- Stoebe muirii Levyns

Species of plant

Stoebe muirii is a shrub belonging to the Asteraceae family. The species is endemic to the Western Cape and is part of the strandveld. The plant occurs from Stilbaai to Bredasdorp and there are less than ten subpopulations. The plant has a range of 1 959 km². It is threatened by invasive plants and coastal development.
