= Jongensfontein =

- Location within Western Cape Location within South Africa
- Coordinates: 34°26′S 21°20′E
- Country: South Africa
- Province: Western Cape
- District: Garden Route
- Municipality: Hessequa

Area
  - Total: 2.34 km^{2} (0.90 sq mi)

Population (2011)
  - Total: 355
  - Density: 152/km^{2} (393/sq mi)

Racial makeup (2011)
  - Black African: 3.4%
  - Coloured: 2.8%
  - White: 93.8%

First languages (2011)
  - Afrikaans: 92.9%
  - English: 5.1%
  - Tswana: 1.2%
  - Other: 0.9%
- Time zone: UTC+2 (SAST)

Jongensfontein (also Groot-Jongensfontein) is a coastal settlement in the Garden Route District Municipality in the Western Cape province of South Africa.
