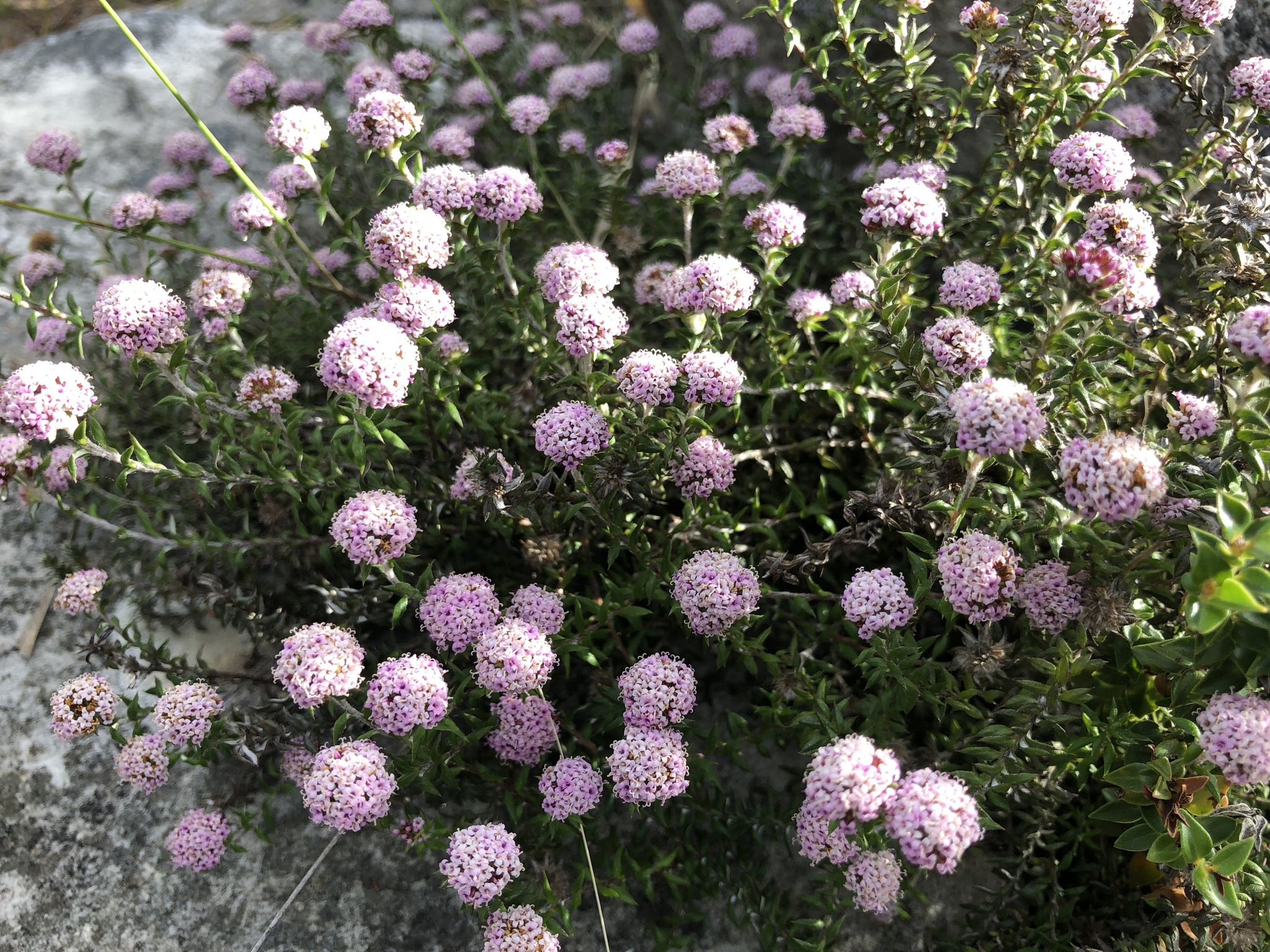

Scientific classification
- Kingdom: Plantae
- Clade: Embryophytes
- Clade: Tracheophytes
- Clade: Spermatophytes
- Clade: Angiosperms
- Clade: Eudicots
- Clade: Asterids
- Order: Asterales
- Family: Asteraceae
- Genus: Stoebe
- Species: S. prostrata

Binomial name
- Stoebe prostrata L.

Synonyms
- Seriphium prostratum (L.) Lam.

= Stoebe prostrata =

Species of plant

Stoebe prostrata is a shrub belonging to the Asteraceae family. The species is endemic to the Western Cape and is part of the fynbos. The plant occurs from the northern Cape Peninsula to Bainskloof and the Riviersonderend Mountains. There is a record of a single plant being found at Goedgeloof Peak in the Langeberg.
