= Stompdrift Dam =

- Interactive map of Stompdrift Dam
- Official name: Stompdrift Dam
- Country: South Africa
- Location: De Rust, Western Cape
- Coordinates: 33°30′45″S 22°35′8″E
- Purpose: Irrigation
- Opening date: 1965
- Owner: Department of Water Affairs

Dam and spillways
- Type of dam: multi-arch, gravity
- Impounds: Olifants River
- Height: 37 metres (121 ft)
- Length: 400 metres (1,300 ft)

Reservoir
- Creates: Stompdrift Dam Reservoir
- Total capacity: 55,300,000 cubic metres (1.95×10^{9} cu ft)
- Catchment area: 5,224 square kilometres (2,017 sq mi)
- Surface area: 620.8 hectares (1,534 acres)

Stompdrift Dam is a combined multi-arch and gravity type dam located on the Olifants River near De Rust, Western Cape, South Africa.

It was constructed in 1965, and serves primarily for irrigation purposes. The hazard potential of the dam has been ranked high (3) because of inadequate capacity in the spillway and structural concerns.

== See also ==
- List of reservoirs and dams in South Africa
- List of rivers of South Africa
