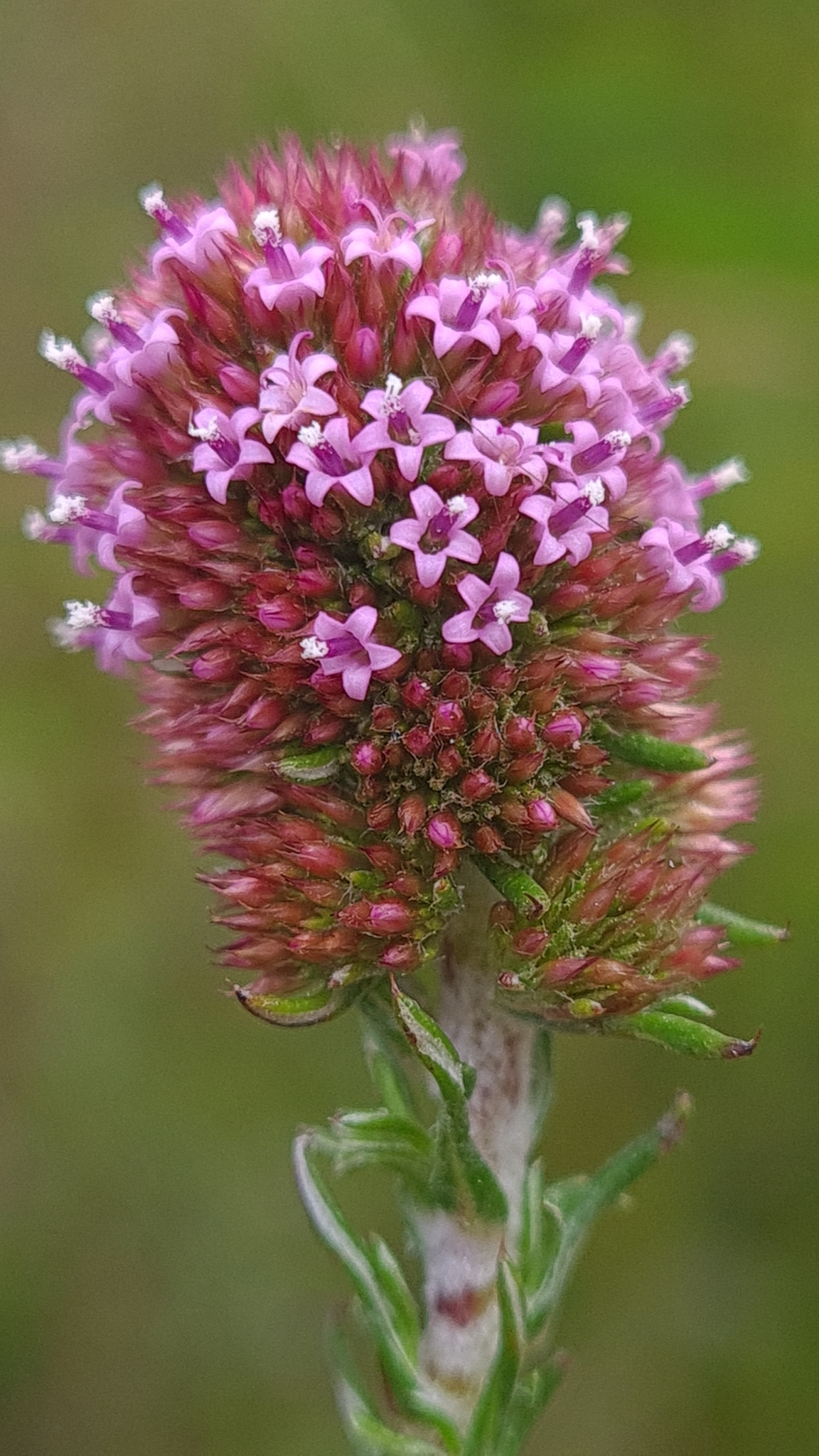

Scientific classification
- Kingdom: Plantae
- Clade: Tracheophytes
- Clade: Angiosperms
- Clade: Eudicots
- Clade: Asterids
- Order: Asterales
- Family: Asteraceae
- Genus: Stoebe
- Species: S. capitata

Binomial name
- Stoebe capitata P.J.Bergius

Synonyms
- Perotriche tortilis Cass.; Seriphium capitatum (P.J.Bergius) Less.; Seriphium perotrichoides Less.; Stoebe affinis S.Moore; Stoebe mossii S.Moore

= Stoebe capitata =

Species of plant

Stoebe capitata is a shrub belonging to the Asteraceae family. The species is endemic to the Eastern Cape and the Western Cape and is part of the fynbos.
