= Stoebe leucocephala =

Scientific classification
- Kingdom: Plantae
- Clade: Tracheophytes
- Clade: Angiosperms
- Clade: Eudicots
- Clade: Asterids
- Order: Asterales
- Family: Asteraceae
- Genus: Stoebe
- Species: S. leucocephala

Binomial name
- Stoebe leucocephala DC.

Synonyms
- Stoebe squarrosa Harv.

Species of plant

Stoebe leucocephala is a shrub belonging to the Asteraceae family. The species is endemic to the Northern Cape and the Western Cape and is part of the fynbos. The plant occurs from Nieuwoudtville to Malmesbury.
