= Stoebe phyllostachya =

Scientific classification
- Kingdom: Plantae
- Clade: Tracheophytes
- Clade: Angiosperms
- Clade: Eudicots
- Clade: Asterids
- Order: Asterales
- Family: Asteraceae
- Genus: Stoebe
- Species: S. phyllostachya

Binomial name
- Stoebe phyllostachya (DC.) Sch.Bip.

Synonyms
- Seriphium candicans Mund ex Harv.; Seriphium phleoides DC.; Seriphium phyllostachyum DC.; Stoebe copholepis Sch.Bip.; Stoebe ensori Compton; Stoebe phleoides (DC.) Sch.Bip.

Species of plant

Stoebe phyllostachya is a shrub belonging to the Asteraceae family. The species is endemic to the Eastern Cape and the Western Cape and is part of the fynbos. The plant occurs from Grabouw to Humansdorp.
