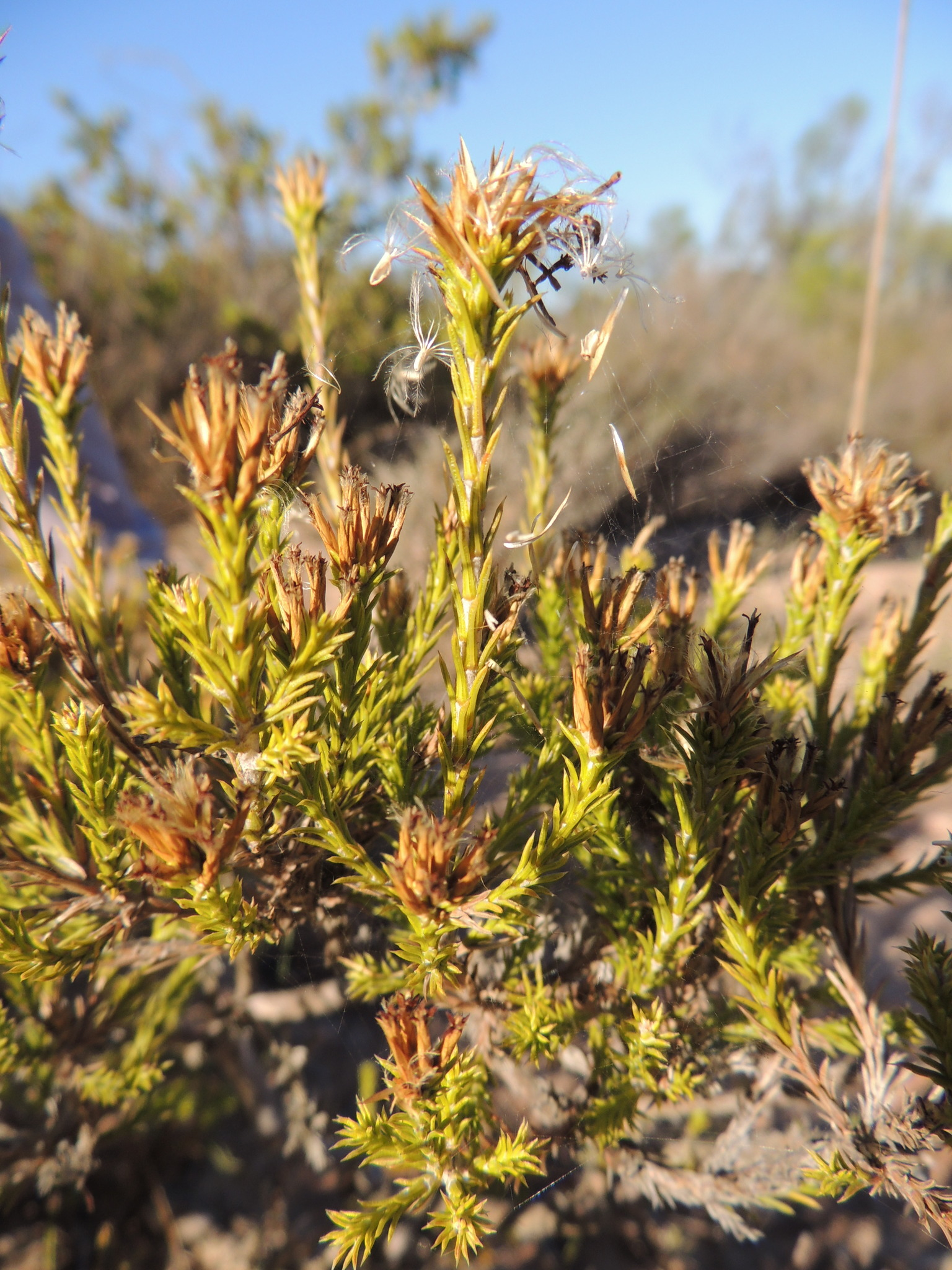

Scientific classification
- Kingdom: Plantae
- Clade: Embryophytes
- Clade: Tracheophytes
- Clade: Spermatophytes
- Clade: Angiosperms
- Clade: Eudicots
- Clade: Asterids
- Order: Asterales
- Family: Asteraceae
- Genus: Stoebe
- Species: S. nervigera

Binomial name
- Stoebe nervigera (DC.) Sch.Bip.

Synonyms
- Seriphium nervigerum DC.; Seriphium nervigerum var. squarrosum DC.

= Stoebe nervigera =

Species of plant

Stoebe nervigera is a shrub belonging to the Asteraceae family. The species is endemic to the Northern Cape and the Western Cape and is part of the fynbos. The plant occurs from southern Namaqualand to Riversdale.
