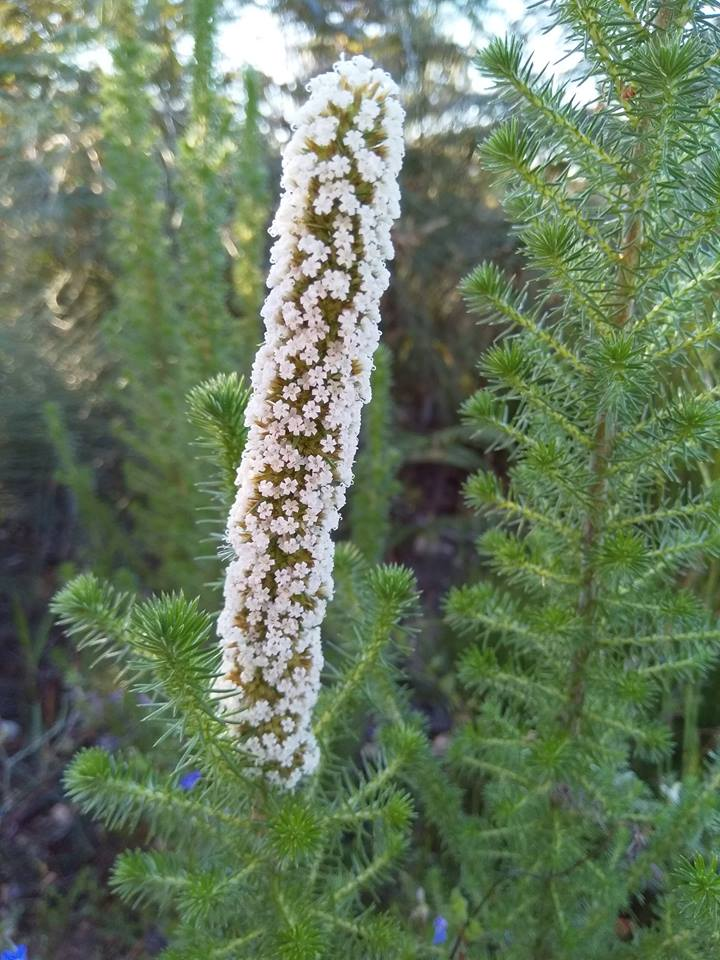

Scientific classification
- Kingdom: Plantae
- Clade: Tracheophytes
- Clade: Angiosperms
- Clade: Eudicots
- Clade: Asterids
- Order: Asterales
- Family: Asteraceae
- Genus: Stoebe
- Species: S. alopecuroides

Binomial name
- Stoebe alopecuroides (Lam.) Less.

Synonyms
- Amphiglossa alopecuroides Sch.Bip.; Seriphium alopecuroides Lam.

= Stoebe alopecuroides =

Species of plant

Stoebe alopecuroides is a shrub growing up to one metre tall. It is endemic to the Western Cape and Eastern Cape where it occurs in forest edges and fynbos from Riversdale to Uitenhage. The leaves are stiffly needle-shaped with the edges rolled in, spreading and twisted. The flower heads are in masses in elongated veins and without ribbon flowers. They are white and surrounded by several rows of brown papery bracts.
