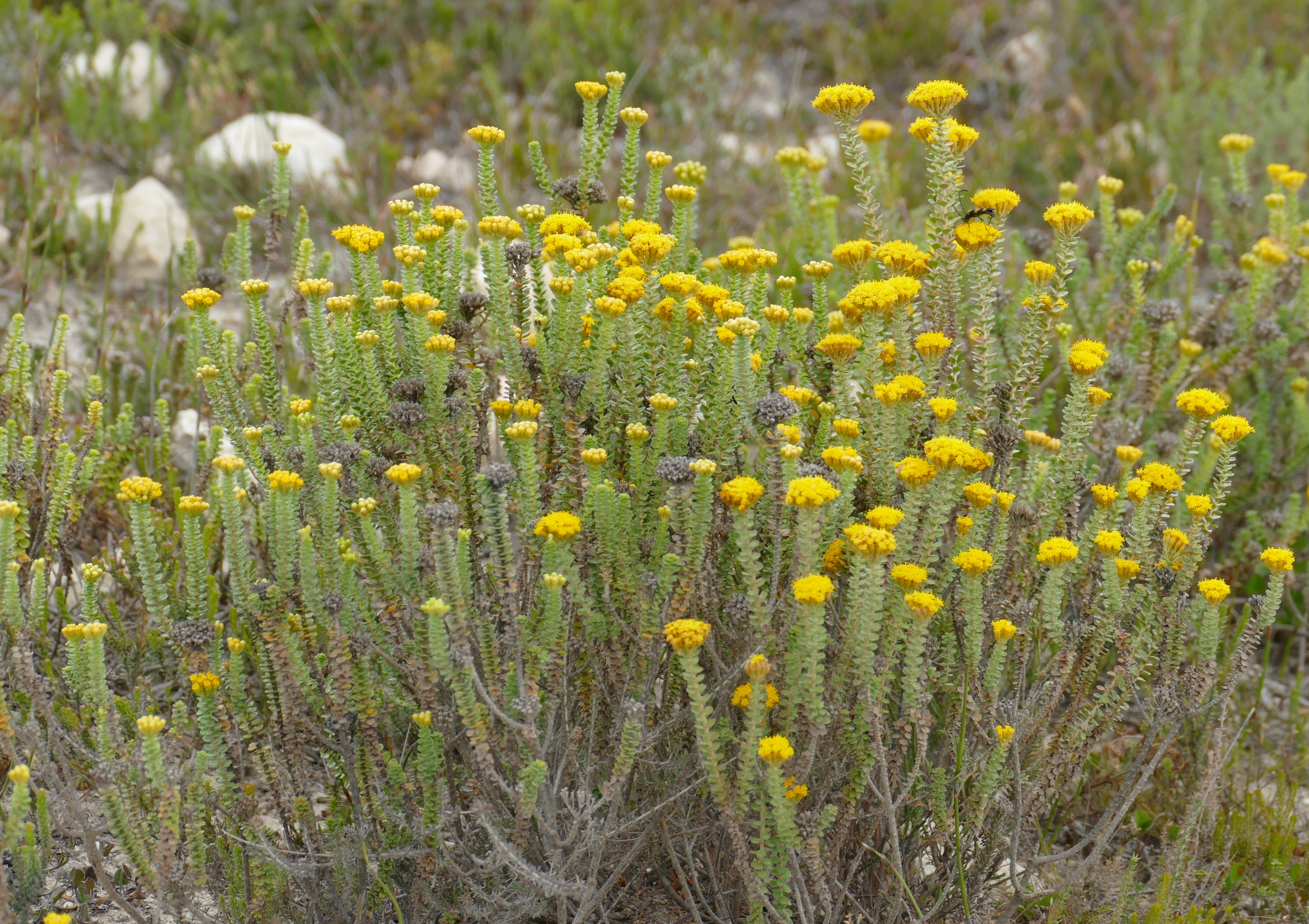

Scientific classification
- Kingdom: Plantae
- Clade: Tracheophytes
- Clade: Angiosperms
- Clade: Eudicots
- Clade: Asterids
- Order: Asterales
- Family: Asteraceae
- Genus: Athanasia
- Species: A. quinquedentata

Binomial name
- Athanasia quinquedentata Thunb.

Synonyms
- ? minor Pappe; Athanasia dimorpha DC.; Athanasia dimorpha subsp. minor (Pappe) Harv.; Athanasia dimorpha var. dimorpha; Athanasia dimorpha var. minor (Pappe) Harv.; Athanasia dimorpha var. obovata Harv.; Athanasia mundii Harv.; Athanasia mundtii Harv.; Athanasia rotundifolia DC.; Holophyllum capitatum Sch.Bip.

= Athanasia quinquedentata =

Species of plant

Athanasia quinquedentata, or the fivetooth kanniedood, is a species of plant from South Africa.

== Description ==
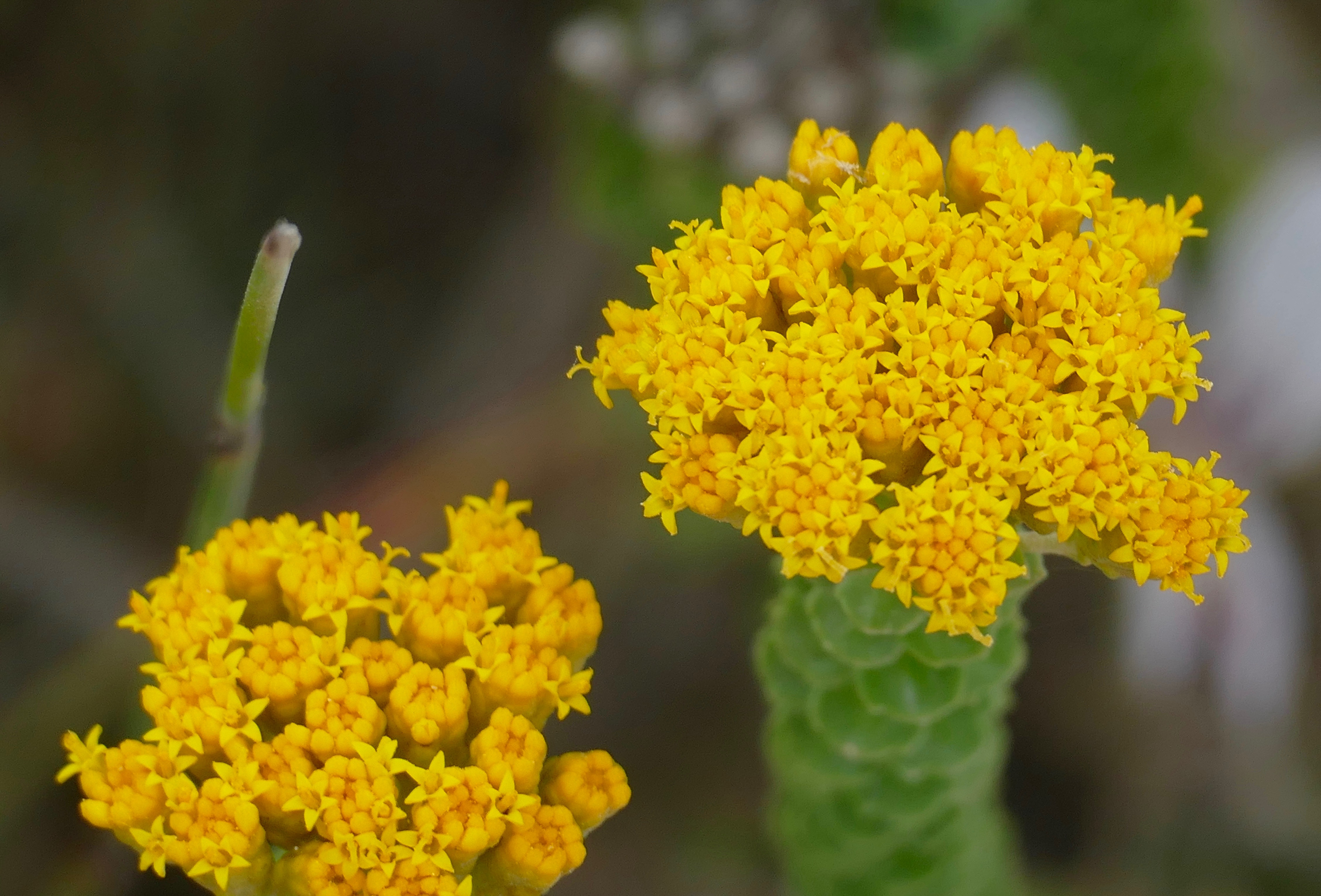
Athanasia quinquedentata flowers

This shrub, which grows to be 60 cm (2.0 ft) tall, is densely leafed. The leaves range from round to oblong in shape and are alternately arranged. The margins have 3-5 convex teeth, although they can also rarely have straight edges. The flowers are yellow with 10-40 florets that grow from a ringed base. The discoid flower heads are mostly borne in terminal corymbs with a ringed base of dense stalked glands. They are present between October and January.

== Distribution and habitat ==
This species is endemic to South Africa. It grows between Stanford and Gqeberha where it grows on limestone and sandstone hills.

There are two subspecies based on the distribution of this species:

- Athanasia quinquedentata subsp. rigens Källersjö: This subspecies is known from a limestone ridge that runs parallel to Stilbaai in the Western Cape of South Africa. It prefers the alkaline sands of coastal lowland regions, but it may also be found on the ecotones between acidic and alkaline regions. It has an area of occurrence of 1,250 km^{2} (480 sq mi) and is known from ten localities.
- Athanasia quinquedentata subsp. quinquedentata is the more widespread of the two subspecies. It is known from the Eastern Cape of South Africa.

== Conservation ==
While Athanasia quinquedentata subsp. quinquedentata is considered to be of least concern by the South African National Biodiversity Institute, Athanasia quinquedentata subsp. rigens is classified as vulnerable. It has a limited range, and it is losing its habitat to invasive acacias.
