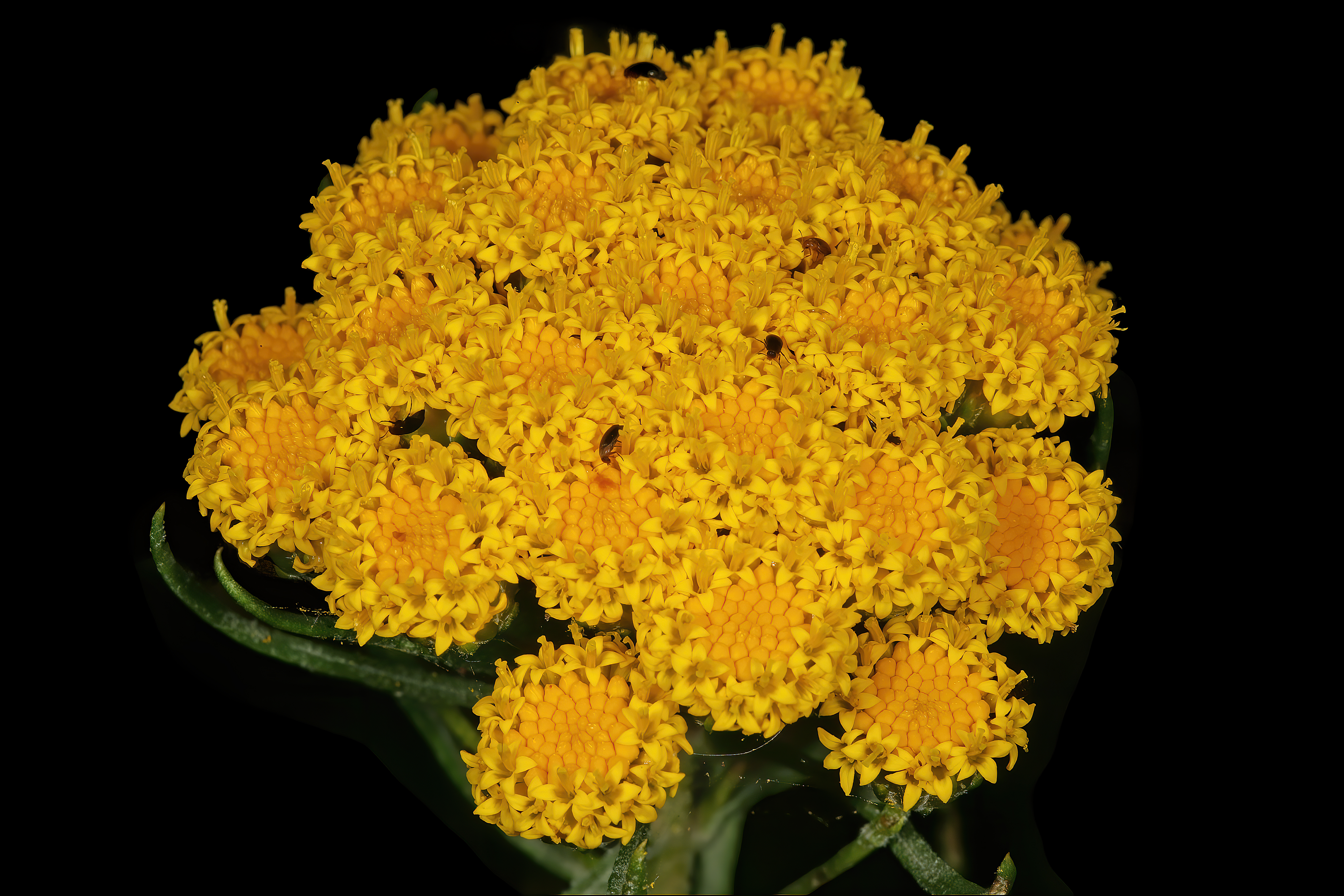
- Athanasia crithmifolia

Scientific classification
- Kingdom: Plantae
- Clade: Embryophytes
- Clade: Tracheophytes
- Clade: Angiosperms
- Clade: Eudicots
- Clade: Asterids
- Order: Asterales
- Family: Asteraceae
- Subfamily: Asteroideae
- Tribe: Anthemideae
- Genus: Athanasia; L.

Type species
- Athanasia crithmifolia (L.) L.

Synonyms
- Stilpnophyton subg. Asaemia Harv.; Asaemia (Harv.) Benth. & Hook.f.; Bembycodium Kunze; Holophyllum Less.; Morysia Cass.; Pristocarpha E.Mey. ex DC.; Saintmorysia Endl.; Stilpnophyton Less.; Stilpnophytum Less.

= Athanasia =

Genus of flowering plants

Athanasia is a genus of flowering plants in the daisy family.

Species

Athanasia is native to southern Africa. The name is derived from the Greek a-, 'without', and thanatos 'death', alluding to the persistent dry involucral bracts.

- Athanasia adenantha (Harv.) Källersjö
- Athanasia alba Källersjö
- Athanasia bremeri Källersjö
- Athanasia calophylla Källersjö
- Athanasia capitata (L.) L.
- Athanasia cochlearifolia Källersjö
- Athanasia crenata (L.) L.
- Athanasia crithmifolia (L.) L.
- Athanasia cuneifolia Lam.
- Athanasia dentata (L.) L.
- Athanasia elsiae Källersjö
- Athanasia filiformis L.f.
- Athanasia flexuosa Thunb.
- Athanasia grandiceps Hilliard & B.L.Burtt
- Athanasia hirsuta Thunb.
- Athanasia humilis Källersjö
- Athanasia imbricata Harv. (Critically Endangered); Western Cape, South Africa. From the foothills of the Riviersonderend Mountains between Stormsvlei and the Breede River.
- Athanasia inopinata (Hutch.) Källersjö
- Athanasia juncea (DC.) D.Dietr.
- Athanasia leptocephala Källersjö
- Athanasia linifolia Burm.f.
- Athanasia microcephala (DC.) D.Dietr.
- Athanasia microphylla DC.
- Athanasia minuta (L.f.) Källersjö
- Athanasia oocephala (DC.) Källersjö
- Athanasia pachycephala DC.
- Athanasia pectinata L.f.
- Athanasia pinnata L.f.
- Athanasia pubescens (L.) L.
- Athanasia quinquedentata Thunb.
- Athanasia rugulosa E.Mey. ex DC.
- Athanasia scabra Thunb.
- Athanasia sertulifera DC.
- Athanasia spathulata (DC.) D.Dietr.
- Athanasia tomentosa Thunb.
- Athanasia trifurcata (L.) L.
- Athanasia vestita (Thunb.) Druce
- Athanasia virgata Jacq.
- Athanasia viridis Källersjö
