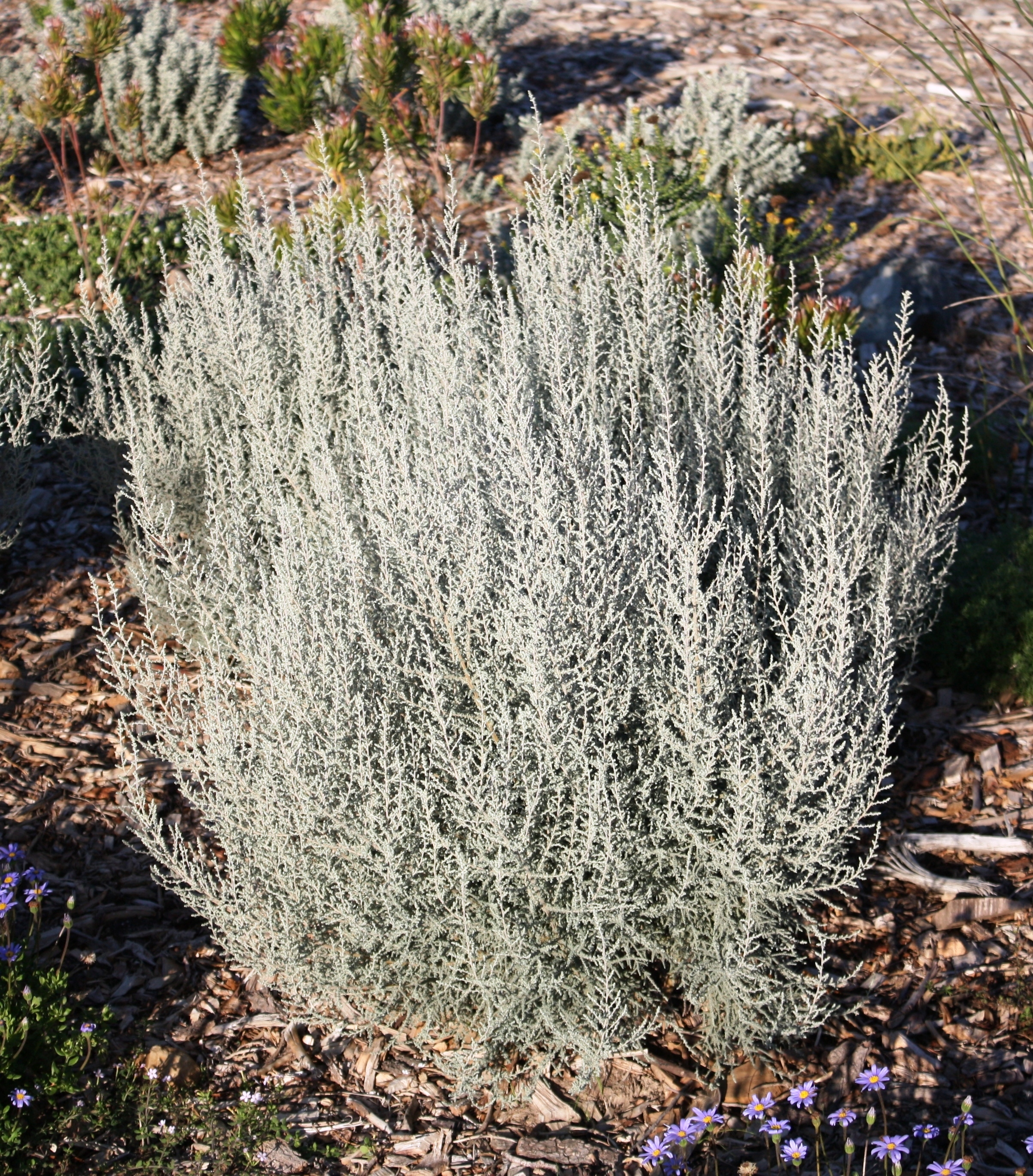

Scientific classification
- Kingdom: Plantae
- Clade: Tracheophytes
- Clade: Angiosperms
- Clade: Eudicots
- Clade: Asterids
- Order: Asterales
- Family: Asteraceae
- Genus: Stoebe
- Species: S. plumosa

Binomial name
- Stoebe plumosa (L.) Thunb.

Synonyms
- Seriphium plumosum (L.); Stoebe vulgaris Levyns; Stoebe virgata Thunb. Stoebe fasciculata Cass. Stoebe cinerea plumosa (Less.) Harv. Stoebe burchellii Levyns; Stoebe plumosum L. Stoebe ruschianus Dinter; Stoebe vermiculata L. Stoebe ambigua Thunb.

= Stoebe plumosa =

Species of plant

Stoebe plumosa, synonym Seriphium plumosum, is a species of flowering plant belonging to the family Asteraceae. It was first described by Carl Linnaeus, and given the correct name by Carl Peter Thunberg. The species is prevalent throughout most of South Africa.
