= Slangrivier =

- Location within Western Cape Location within South Africa
- Coordinates: 34°08′14″S 20°51′42″E
- Country: South Africa
- Province: Western Cape
- District: Garden Route
- Municipality: Hessequa

Area
  - Total: 11.36 km^{2} (4.39 sq mi)

Population (2011)
  - Total: 3,011
  - Density: 265.1/km^{2} (686.5/sq mi)

Racial makeup (2011)
  - Black African: 2.1%
  - Coloured: 96.0%
  - Indian/Asian: 0.7%
  - White: 0.7%
  - Other: 0.5%

First languages (2011)
  - Afrikaans: 96.0%
  - English: 2.1%
  - Other: 1.9%
- Time zone: UTC+2 (SAST)

Slangrivier is a settlement in the Garden Route District Municipality in the Western Cape province of South Africa.

The name of the village, which is located 15 km from Heidelberg, means "snake river". It was established in 1838, when Sir George Grey awarded the small settlement to the indigenous community for their loyalty during the Cape Frontier Wars.
