= Gouritsmond =

- Nickname: "Die Mond"
- Location within Western Cape Location within South Africa
- Coordinates: 34°20′59″S 21°52′43″E
- Country: South Africa
- Province: Western Cape
- District: Garden Route
- Municipality: Hessequa

Area
  - Total: 3.24 km^{2} (1.25 sq mi)

Population (2011)
  - Total: 515
  - Density: 159/km^{2} (412/sq mi)

Racial makeup (2011)
  - Black African: 5.3%
  - Coloured: 54.5%
  - Indian/Asian: 0.4%
  - White: 39.5%
  - Other: 0.4%

First languages (2011)
  - Afrikaans: 93.0%
  - English: 3.3%
  - Tswana: 1.4%
  - Other: 2.3%
- Time zone: UTC+2 (SAST)
- Postal code (street): 6696
- PO box: 6696
- Area code: 028

Gouritsmond is a small South African tourist town in the municipality of Hessequa, Garden Route District, Western Cape Province. It is situated about 36 road kilometres south-east of Albertinia. Gouritsmond is located just on the west side of the Gouritz River estuary and on the Indian Ocean. In 2011, Gouritsmond had 515 inhabitants in 206 households.

== Description ==
The landscape surrounding the village is a section of the coastal plains of the Cape and is characterised by overgrown sand dunes. Its name is derived from the mouth of the Gouritz River, which flows into the ocean here.

As an official administrative settlement, Gouritsmond is a young settlement, although European immigrants have been farming in the area since 1730. In the process, the present settlement area was a fishing ground and was therefore called The Fisheries. Gouritsmond was granted town status in 1915 and changed its name to Gouritzriviermond between 1915 and 1966 and finally to the current version.

== Landmarks ==
In Gouritsmond, tourism offers form an essential economic basis for the inhabitants. The village is situated on a sea beach and a large sandbank (barre) in the estuary of the river. Typical activities here include sea fishing, surfing and wildlife watching. There are four designated hiking routes of varying lengths.

The Gouritsmond Conservation Trust, a regional conservation group, provides information about the sensitive plant communities of the fynbos biome with the support of the local community. There is information about this at the hiking trails.

== Traffic ==
The town can be reached by road via the 26-kilometre R325 regional road, which branches off the N2 national road between Albertinia and Mossel Bay. A bridge over the Gouritz River creates a rural road connection to Mossel Bay. Originally the village was only accessible via a gravel road with a total of 25 gates along the way. In 1938, a tarmac road was built, which has since contributed to quick accessibility.
