= Albertinia, South Africa =

Albertinia
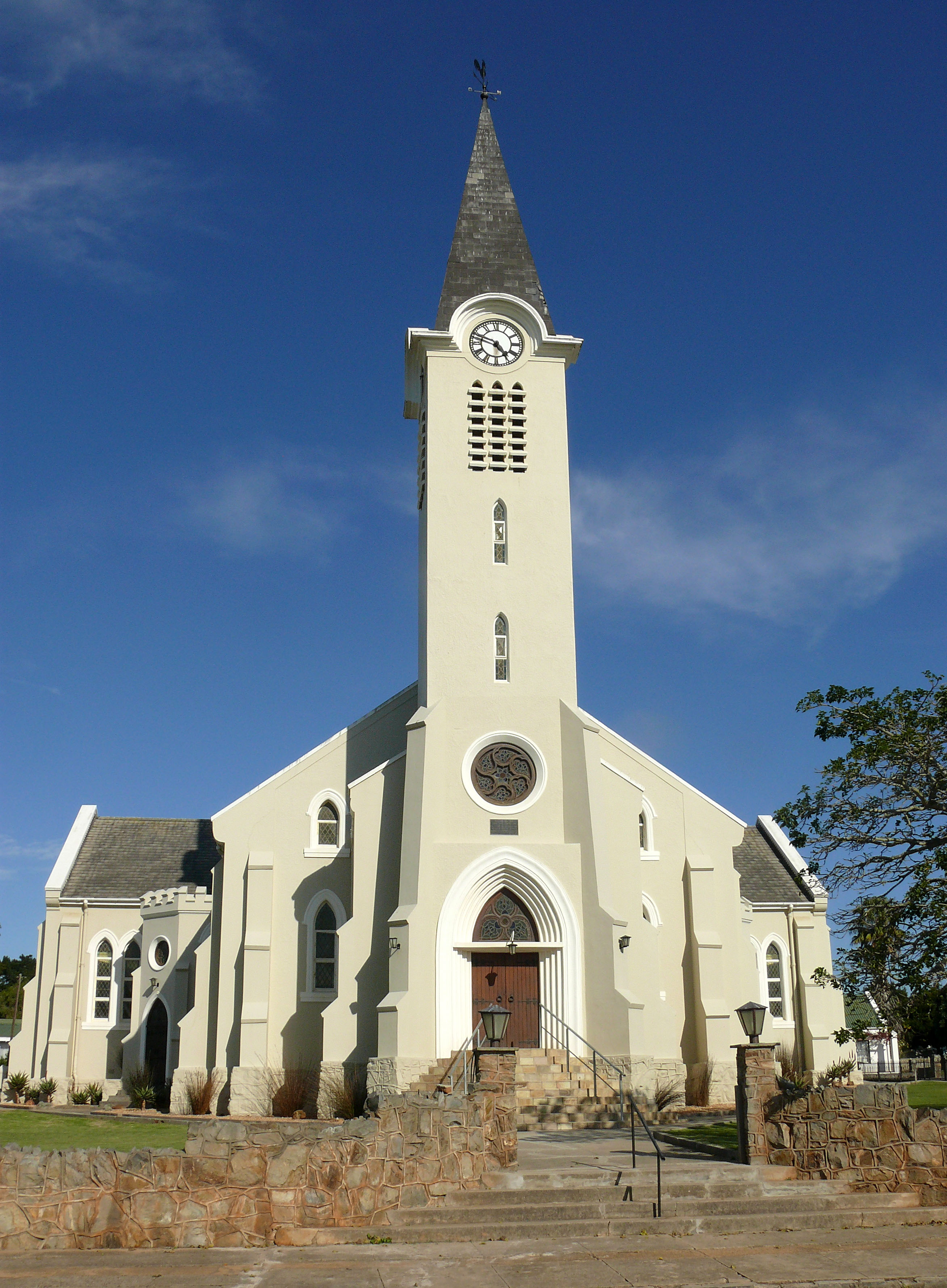
- Dutch Reformed Church in Albertinia

- Location within Western Cape Location within South Africa
- Coordinates: 34°12′S 21°35′E
- Country: South Africa
- Province: Western Cape
- District: Garden Route
- Municipality: Hessequa

Government
  - Councillor: Hendrik Saayman (DA)

Area
  - Total: 5.76 km^{2} (2.22 sq mi)

Population (2011)
  - Total: 6,372
  - Density: 1,110/km^{2} (2,870/sq mi)

Racial makeup (2011)
  - Black African: 10.6%
  - Coloured: 68.5%
  - Indian/Asian: 0.3%
  - White: 20.1%
  - Other: 0.5%

First languages (2011)
  - Afrikaans: 94.2%
  - English: 2.8%
  - Other: 3.0%
- Time zone: UTC+2 (SAST)
- Postal code (street): 6695
- PO box: 6695
- Area code: 028

Albertinia is a settlement in the Hessequa Municipality in the Western Cape province of South Africa.

The town, located within the Hessequa region, is about 50 km west of Mossel Bay, at the foot of the Langeberg Mountains, and is fondly referred to as the Aloe Capital of South Africa. The region in which the town is located in, is branded as The Explorer's Garden Route.

== Plant Life ==
Albertinia has two Aloe factories, as Aloe ferox, or Cape Aloe is indigenous to the area. Another plant indigenous to the Albertinia district is Thamnochortus insignis, commonly known as thatch, which is exported for commercial use.

== Tourism ==
The Dutch Reformed Church is often the centre stage for travel photography, and is one of the most recognized churches along the Garden Route.

== History ==
The town was laid out in 1900 on the farm Grootfontein and became a municipality in 1920. The name is derived from the surname of Johannes Rudolph Albertyn (1847-1920), the first Dutch Reformed minister to serve the community.
