= Seven Passes Road =

Mountain pass in South Africa

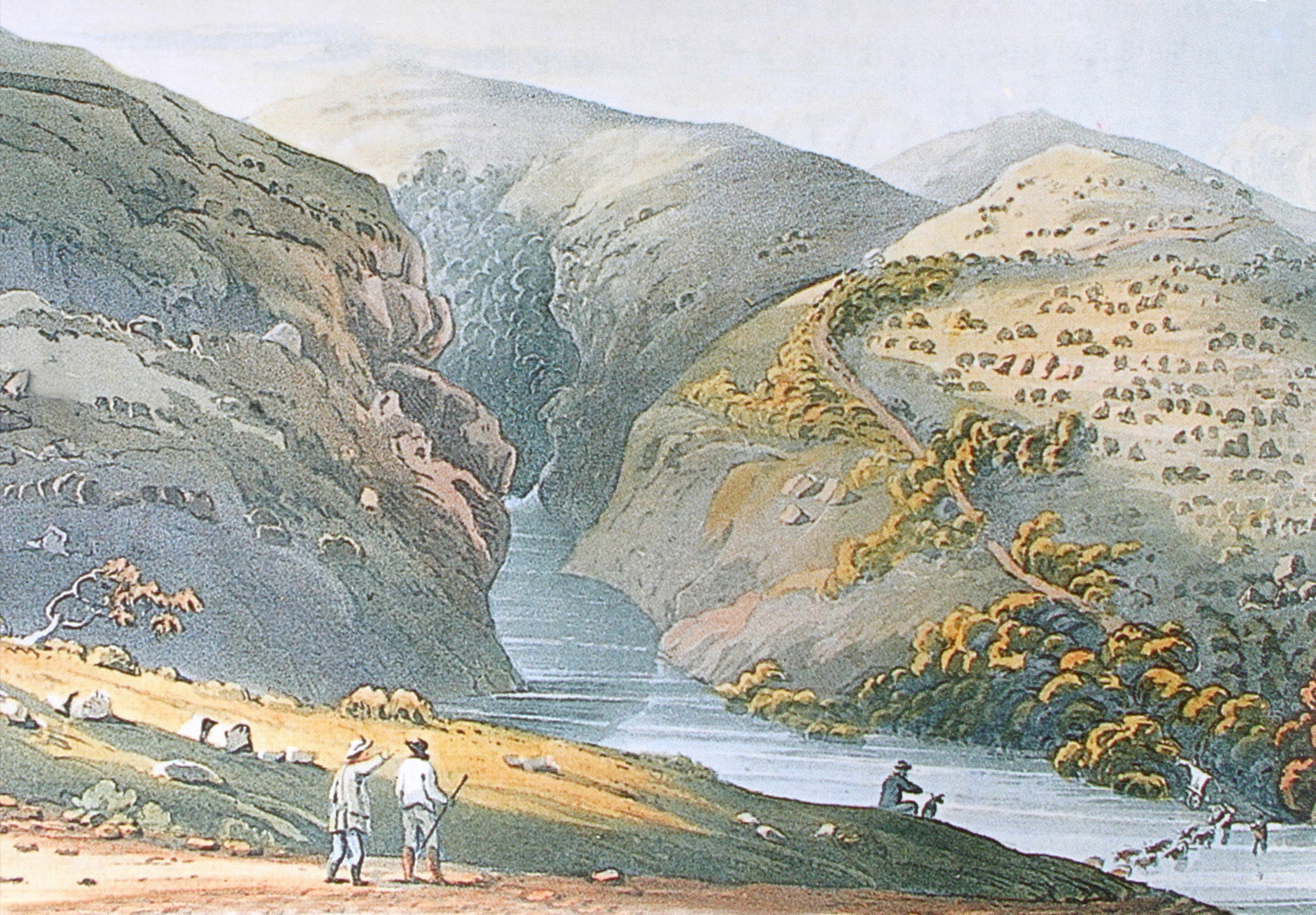
Painting of Kaaimans Grotto, by Christian Ignatius Latrobe, 1816

Seven Passes Road is the oldest direct road link between George and Knysna in Western Cape, South Africa. The road which traverses seven passes was engineered by Thomas Charles John Bain and Adam de Smidt. It was completed around 1883 and is situated just south of the Outeniqua Mountains.

== Seven passes ==
The seven passes, in order from George to Knysna, are:

- Kaaimans River Pass
- Silwer River Pass
- Touw River Pass
- Hoogekraal Pass
- Karatara Pass
- Homtini Pass
- Phantom Pass

== History ==
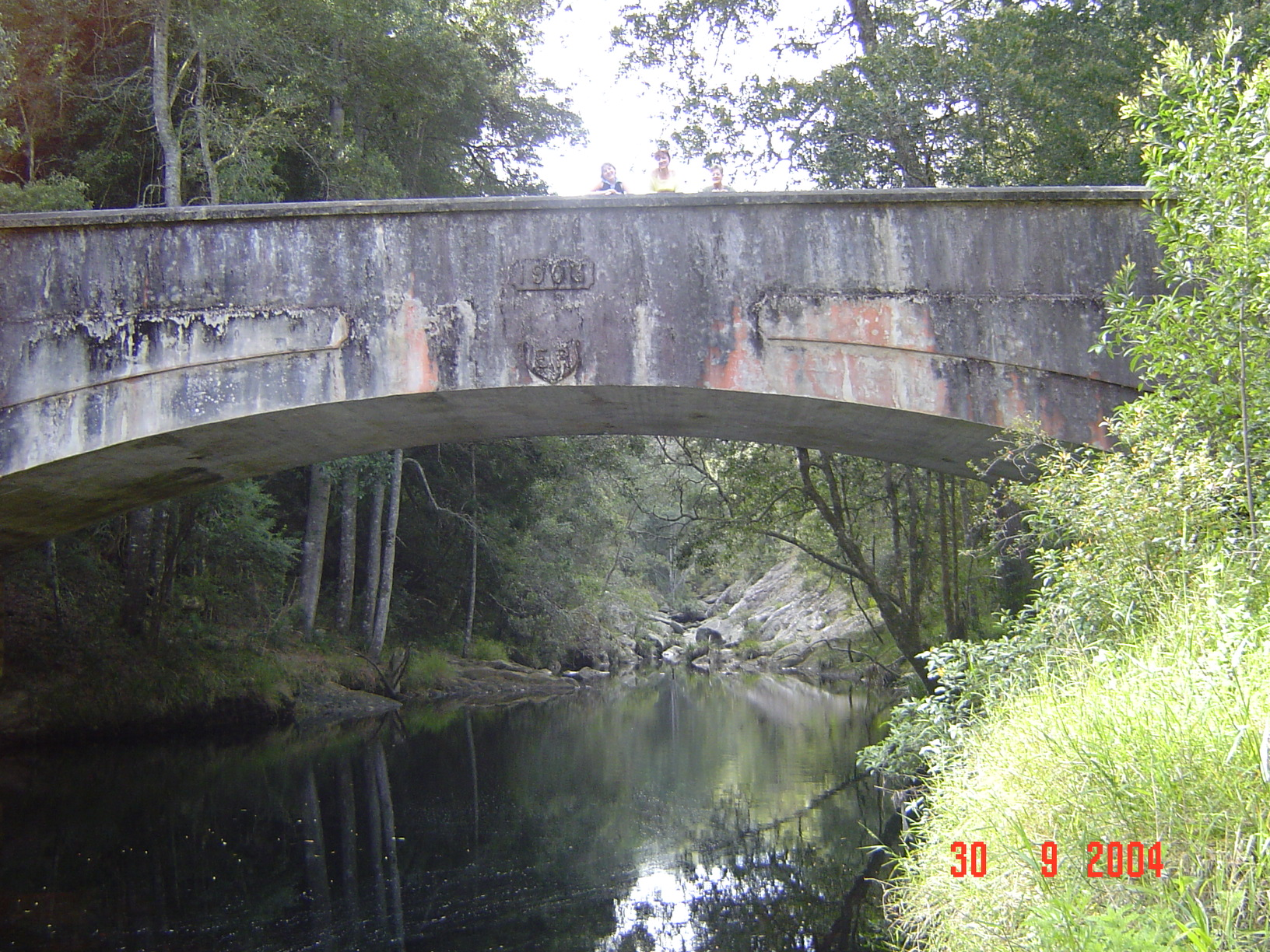
The bridge over the Silwer River

The first of the passes to be completed was Phantom Pass, in 1862, which was named for the ghost moths that live in the area. The pass was rebuilt in 1882. In 1863, Bain designed the 75-km road from George to Knysna, which reached the Kaaimans River in 1869 and Woodville (26 km from George) in 1871. The discovery of gold near Karatara led to expansion lines toward there and further north near the Homtini River. Homtini Pass, the last completed, was finished in 1882 and officially opened in 1883.

== Present day ==
Seven Passes Road is a tourist attraction very popular with mountain bikers. Attractions along the road include the old gold fields near Millwood. Nowadays, Seven Passes Road has been replaced for transportation purposes by the N2 national road, including Kaaimans River Pass between George and Wilderness.

== Gallery ==
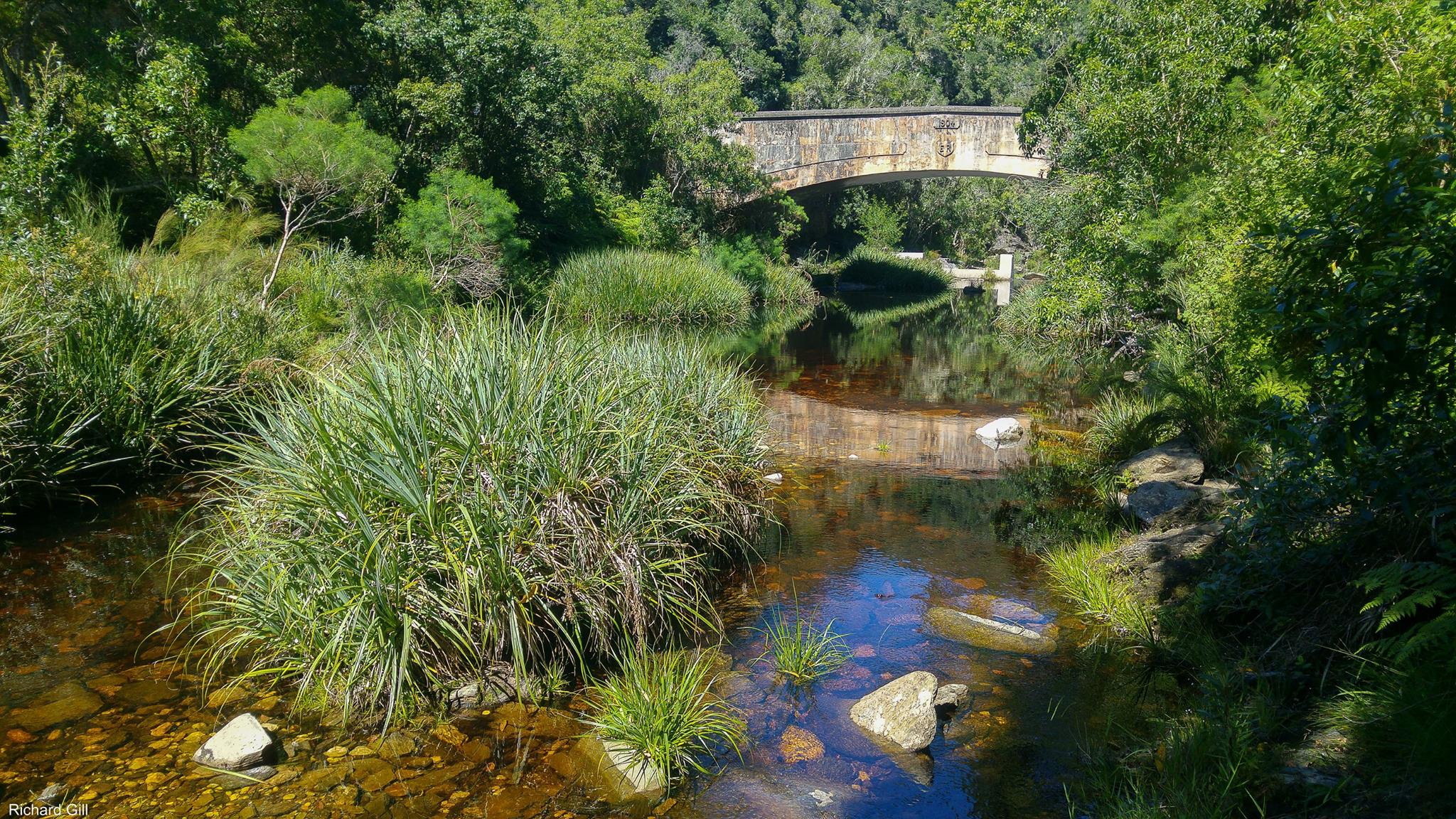
Kaaimans River bridge on the Seven Passes Road between George and Knysna; built by Thomas Charles John Bain. Palmiet growing in foreground.
