= Outeniqua Choo Tjoe =

Coordinates: 34.040087°S 23.043850°E

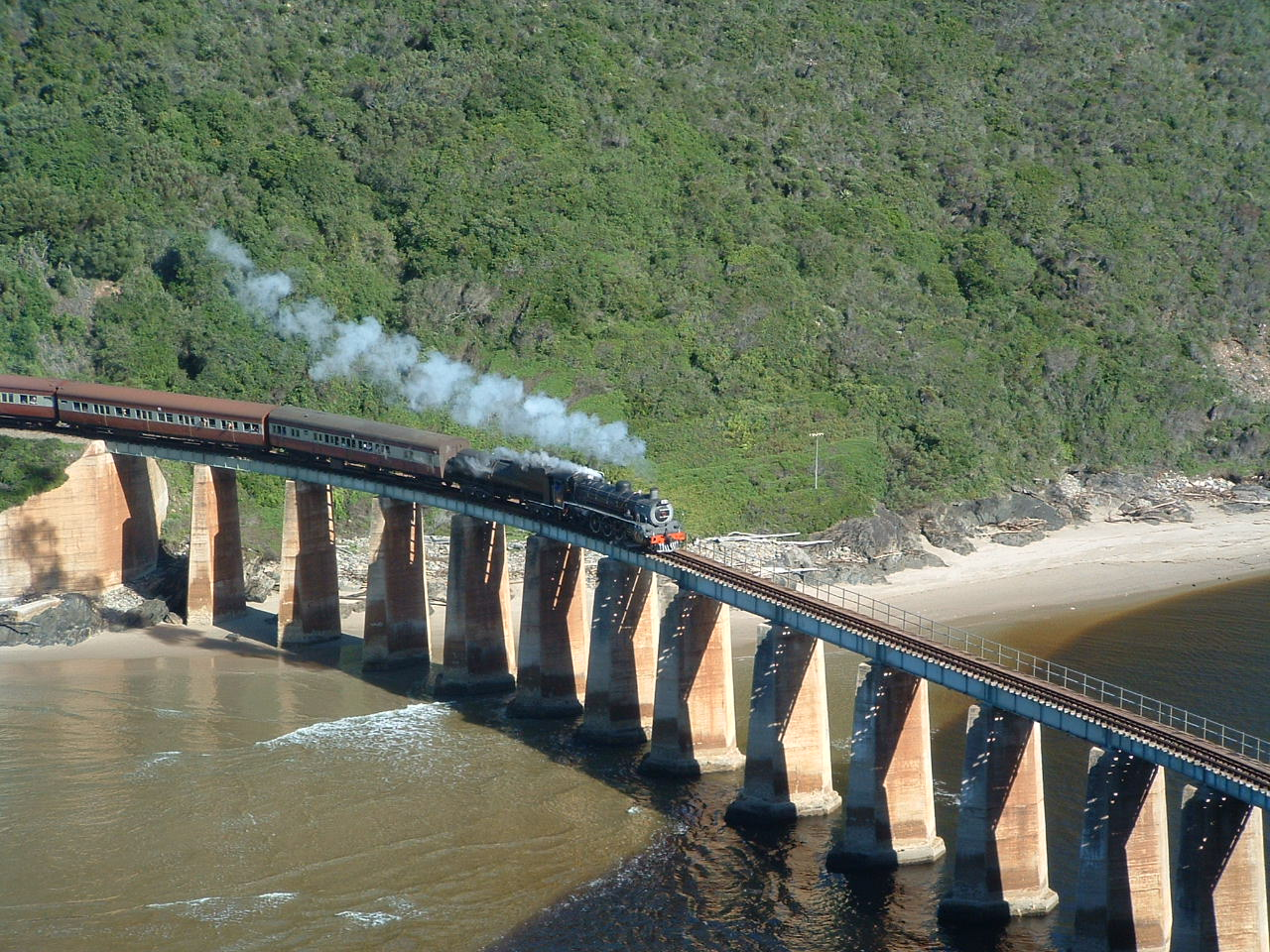
- Crossing the Kaaimans River into Wilderness

Overview
- Status: Under restoration
- Termini: George; Knysna
- Website: www.outeniquachootjoe.com

Service
- Type: Heritage railway

History
- Closed: 17 October 2010; 15 years ago

Technical
- Line length: 67.0 km (41.6 mi)
- Track length: 67.6 km (42.0 mi)
- Number of tracks: 1
- Track gauge: 1,067 mm (3 ft 6 in)
Route map
Interactive Map

The Outeniqua Choo Tjoe was Africa’s last regularly scheduled passenger steam train, operating on the branch line connecting George and Knysna along the scenic Garden Route. Covering 67.0 km (41.6 mi), the line passed through areas including Victoria Bay, the Kaaimans River Bridge, Wilderness, Sedgefield, and Goukamma. Passenger numbers grew from around 40,000 per year to 115,000 by the early 2000s, 70% of whom were foreign tourists. The line and steam service were declared an officially preserved railway in 1992.

== History ==
The line was constructed to serve both passenger and freight traffic along the Garden Route. It became a popular heritage railway, attracting tourists due to its historic steam locomotives and the scenic landscapes it traversed.

In August 2006, heavy floods damaged sections of the line, forcing a suspension of services. From November 2006, the train was temporarily rerouted to operate between George and Mossel Bay, with a stop at Hartenbos, until normal service could not be resumed.

The Outeniqua Choo Tjoe ceased operation on 17 September 2010. Transnet Limited, the owner, stated that the train was not part of its core business and sought new operators through a tender process. Despite discussions with private companies such as Classic Rail, no agreement was reached, resulting in permanent closure. Local authorities emphasized the heritage and tourism value of the line, advocating for its preservation.

== Rolling Stock ==
Trains were typically hauled by SAR Class 19D steam locomotives with Vanderbilt-like “torpedo” tenders. Class 24 engines were occasionally used. During dry summer conditions, SAR Class 32 diesel locomotives substituted to reduce the risk of wildfire. Passenger coaches consisted of heritage-style carriages designed for tourism services.

== Revival efforts ==
After the 2010 closure, several proposals were made to revive the line. In December 2021, Transnet Freight Rail issued a Request for Proposals for the management and operation of the line, closing in April 2022. By September 2022, Classic Rail was one of two bidders still in contention.

On 6 October 2025, Classic Rail announced that it had secured contracts and funding to rehabilitate the George–Knysna line and relaunch the Outeniqua Choo Tjoe as a tourist service. Reopening will occur in two phases: Knysna–Sedgefield first, followed by Sedgefield–George. The first phase is estimated to take approximately 12 months.

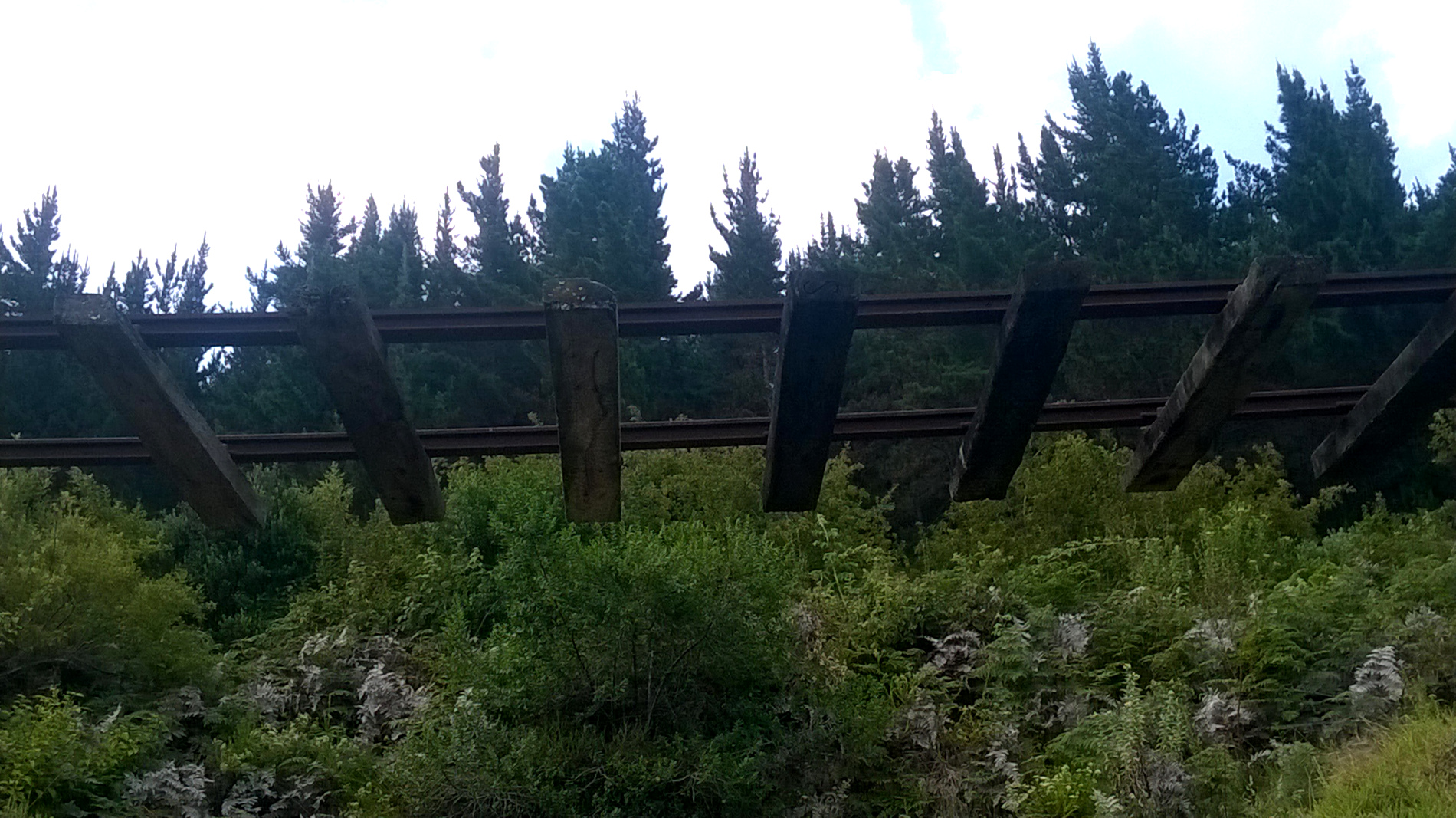
Railway track in Goukamma Valley.

Inspection of the railway line in 2025 revealed natural degradation, including collapsed slopes, rotted or removed sleepers, and trees growing between rails and sleepers.

== Popular culture ==
In 2008, the train and the Kaaiman's River Bridge were featured in a television advertisement for Stella Artois.
