= Kaaimans River =

River in the Western Cape, South Africa

Kaaimans River Kaaimansrivier
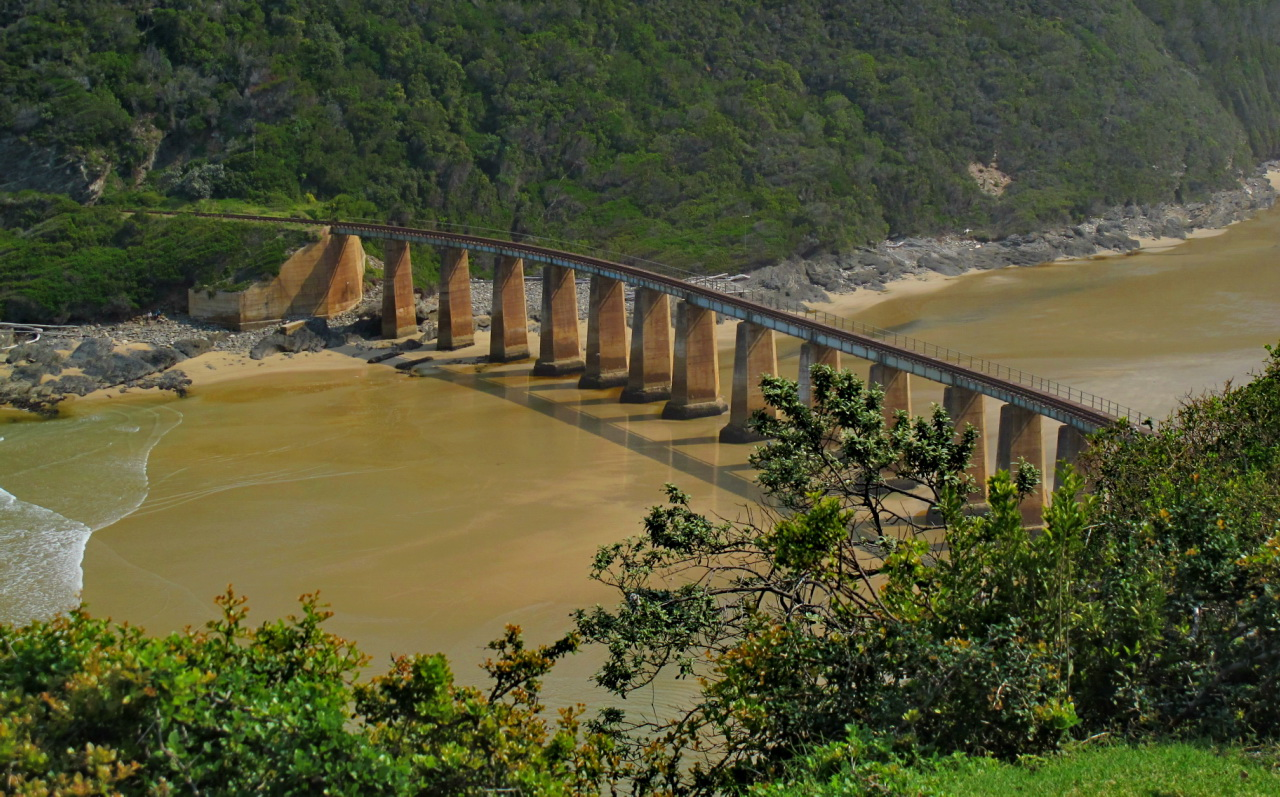
- Tide coming up the estuary of the Kaaimans River

- Location of the Kaaimans River mouth
- Etymology: Named kaaiman after leguaan, a species of Monitor Lizard which was formerly found in the river.
- Nickname: Keeromrivier

Location
- Country: South Africa
- Province: Western Cape
- Region: Garden Route

Physical characteristics
- Source: N of George
  - location: Outeniqua Mountains
- Mouth: Indian Ocean
  - location: W of Wilderness, Western Cape
  - coordinates: 33°59′52″S 22°33′25″E
  - elevation: 0 m (0 ft)

The Kaaimans River (Afrikaans: Kaaimansrivier), also known as Keerom River, is a river in the Western Cape, South Africa. The mouth of the river lies near Wilderness. Further upriver, the Kaaimans River Gorge is popular for hiking and whitewater kayaking.

The nearest large towns are Mossel Bay and George.

== History ==
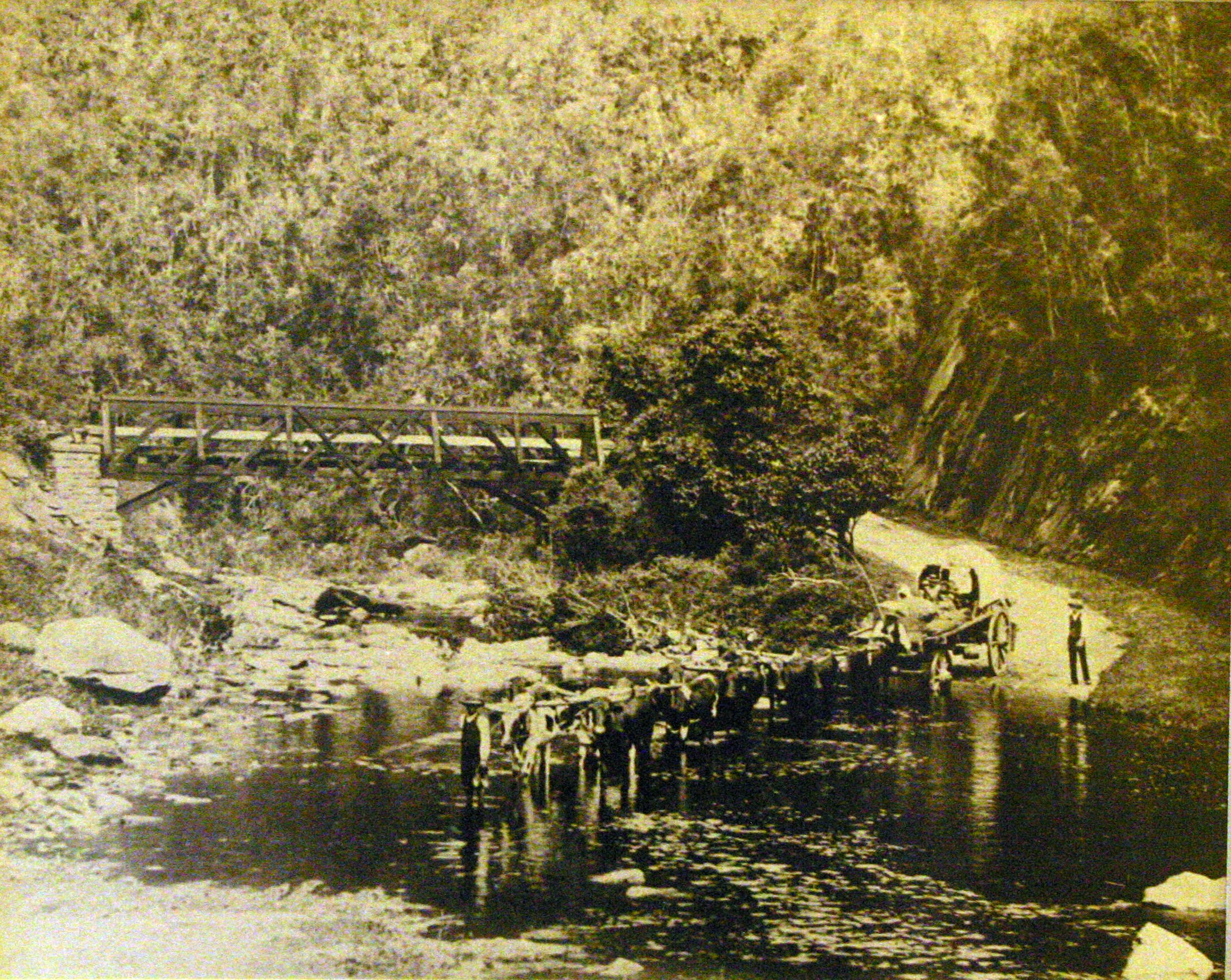
Ox-wagon crossing the Kaaimans River in the late 19th century

The Kaaimans River was formerly an obstacle for travellers, whose wagons had to wait sometimes for weeks before being able to cross it safely when it ran full of water. It was also nicknamed "Keeromrivier" (Turnabout River) because, faced with the raging waters, some travellers had to turn and try to find another way to reach their destination. Finally this obstacle was overcome when the Seven Passes Road was built by Thomas Charles John Bain.

The tidal estuary at its mouth is crossed by a rail bridge. The Outeniqua Choo Tjoe, the last passenger steam train in Africa, crossed this bridge until the line was closed due to landslides in 2006.

== Gallery ==
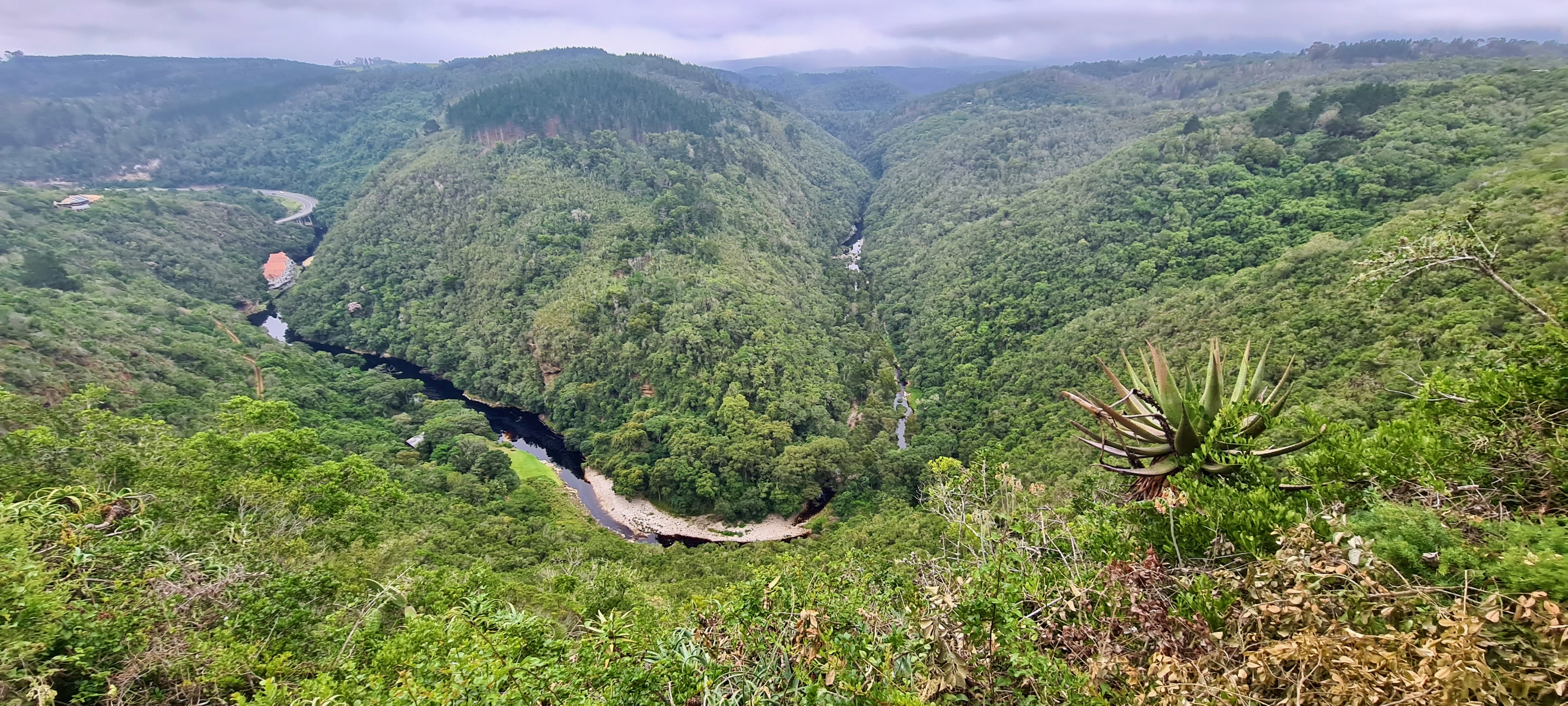
Map of Africa viewpoint

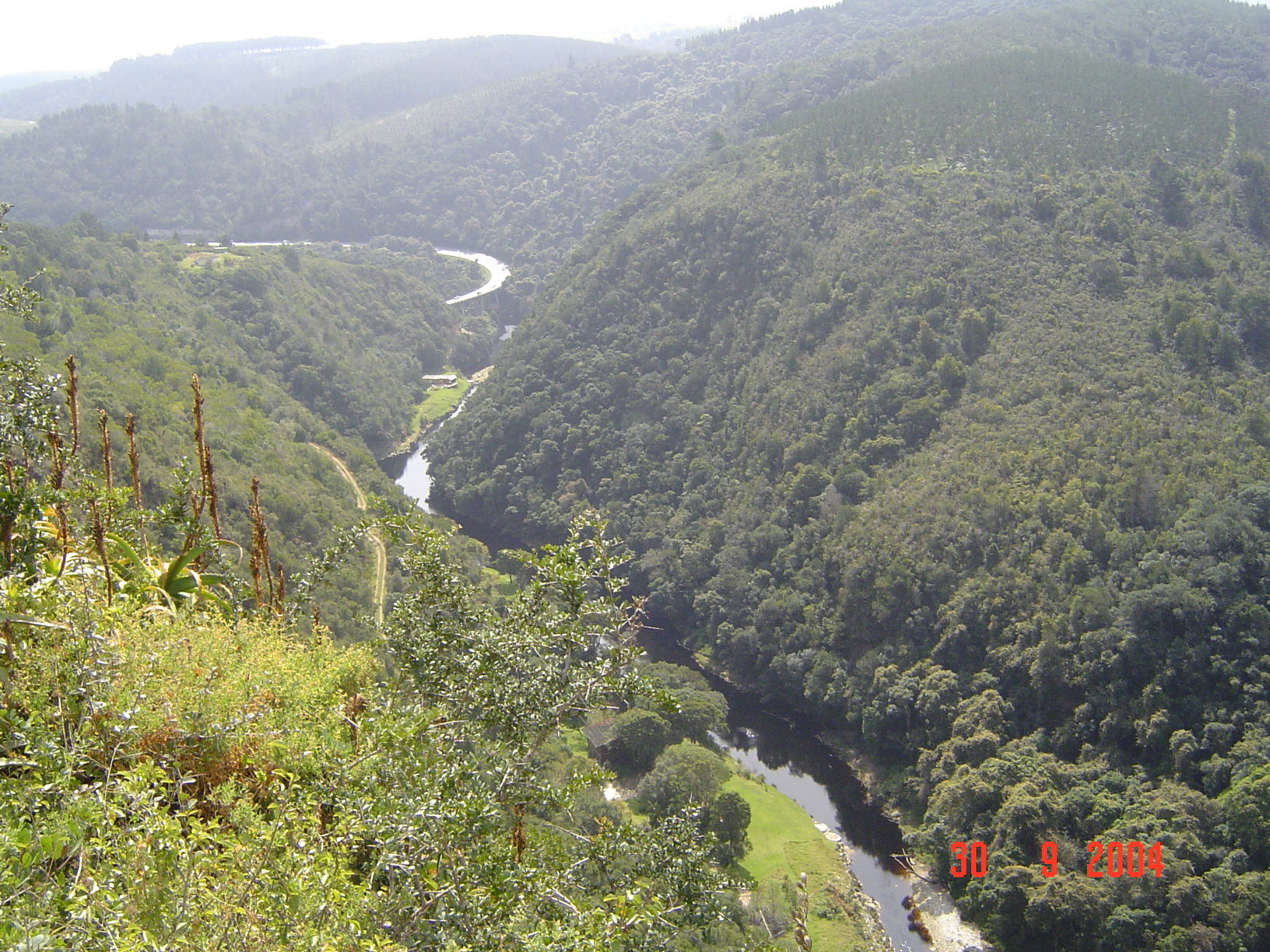
The N2 crossing the Kaaimans River

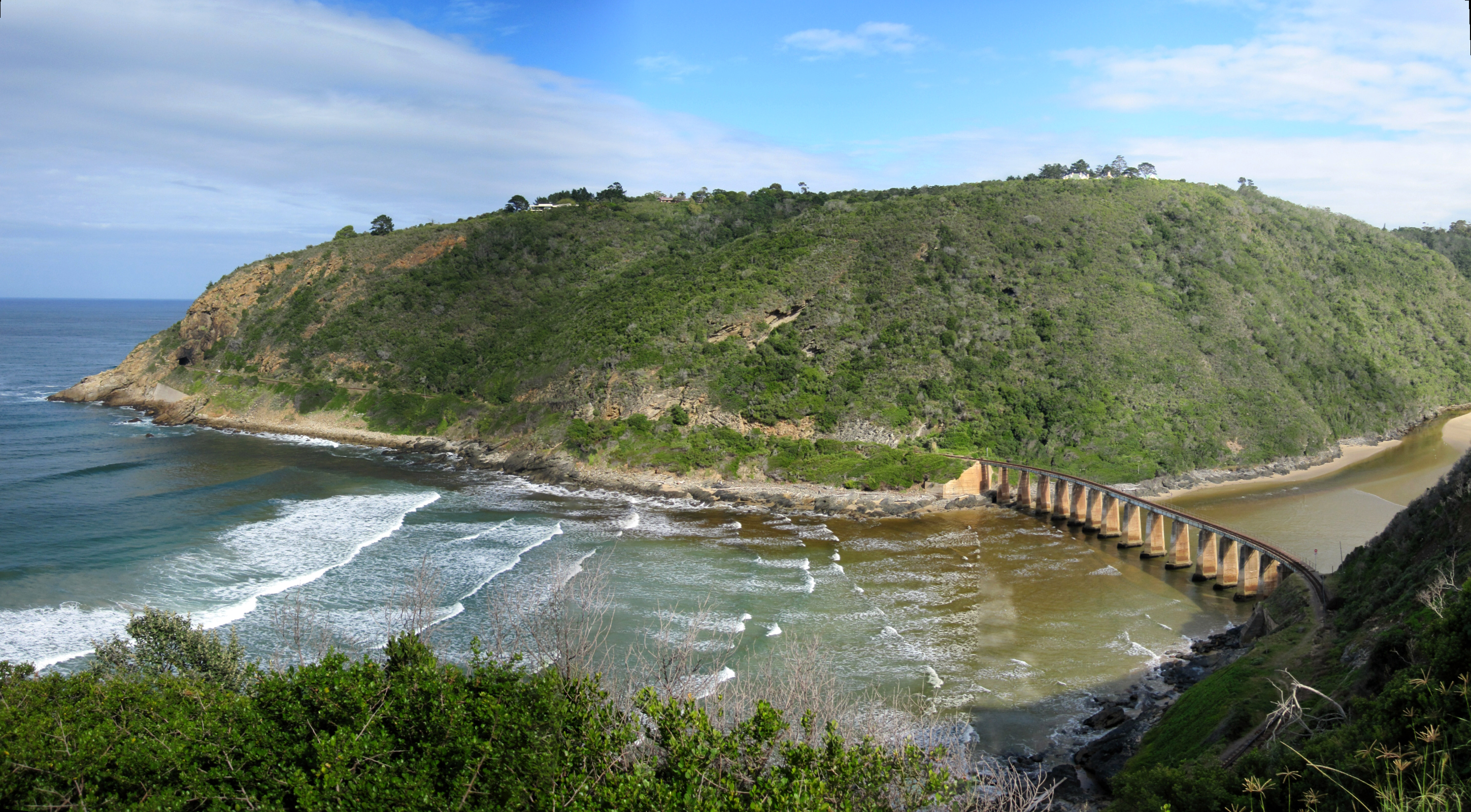
Kaaimans River mouth

== See also ==
- List of rivers of South Africa
- Kaaimans Rivier Pass
