= John Latrobe =

John Latrobe may refer to:

- John Antes Latrobe (1799–1838), English cleric and writer on music
- John H. B. Latrobe (1803–1891), American lawyer and inventor
