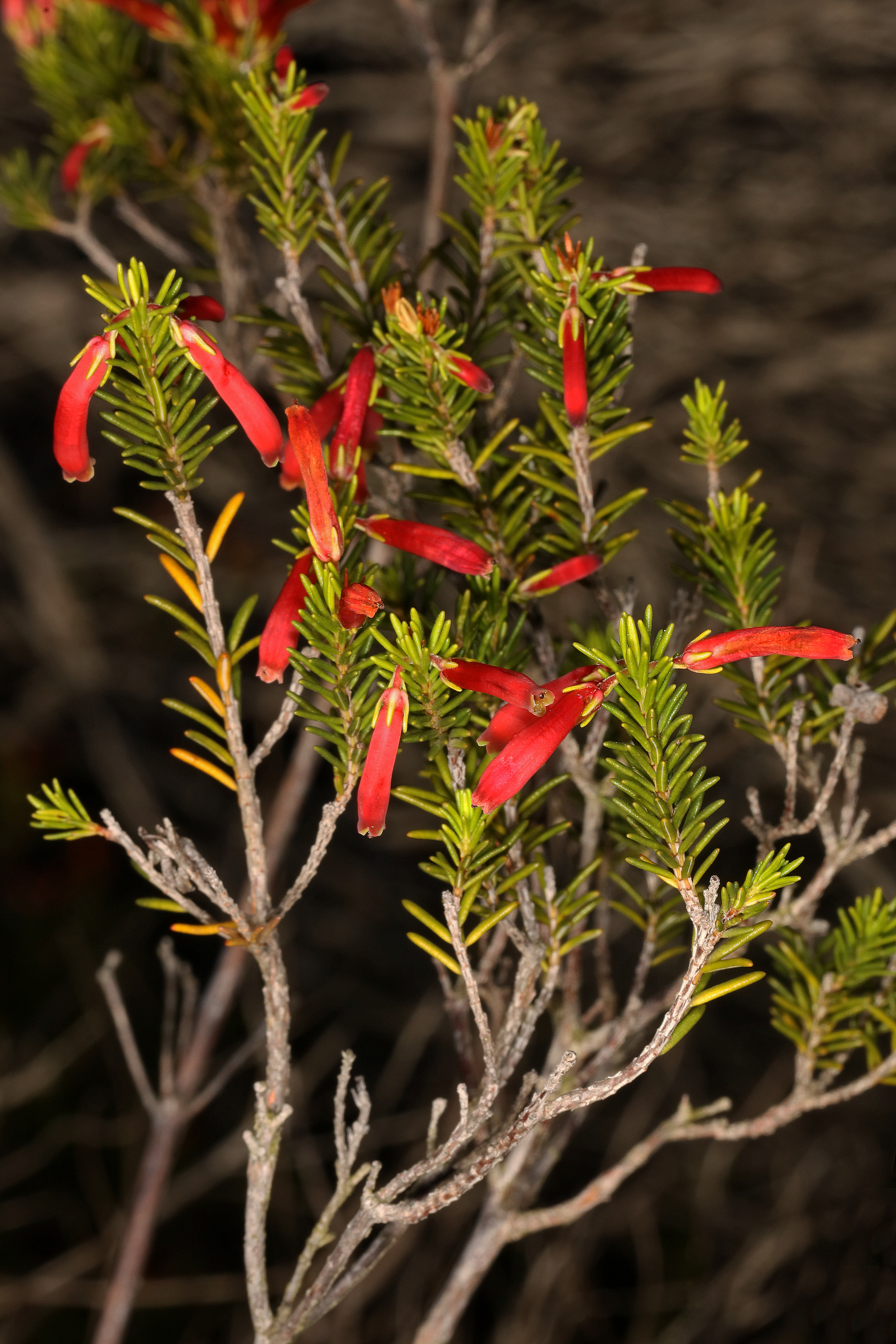

Scientific classification
- Kingdom: Plantae
- Clade: Tracheophytes
- Clade: Angiosperms
- Clade: Eudicots
- Clade: Asterids
- Order: Ericales
- Family: Ericaceae
- Genus: Erica
- Species: E. chloroloma

Binomial name
- Erica chloroloma Lindl. (1838)

Synonyms
- Ericoides chlorolomum (Lindl.) Kuntze; Erica dregeana Klotzsch

= Erica chloroloma =

Species of flowering plant

Erica chloroloma is a plant that belongs to the genus Erica and forms part of the fynbos. The species is endemic to the Eastern Cape and Western Cape and occurs from Wilderness to the Great Fish River Estuary. There are currently between ten and fifteen fragmented populations and the habitat is constantly shrinking. One reason is invasive plants.
