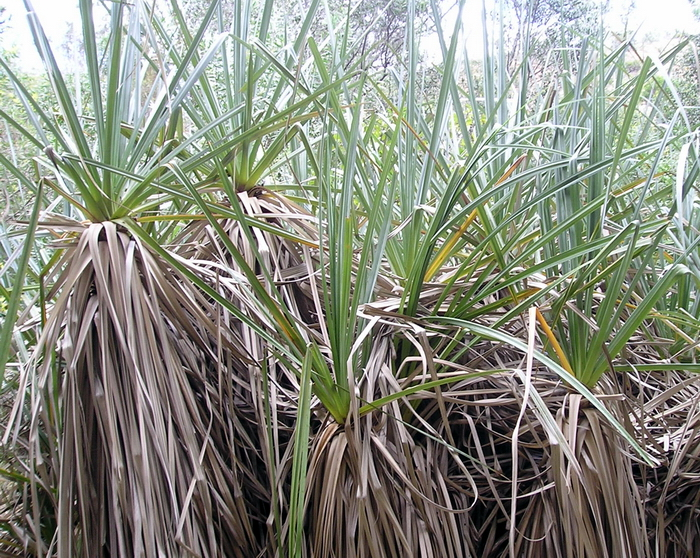
- Prionium serratum

Scientific classification
- Kingdom: Plantae
- Clade: Tracheophytes
- Clade: Angiosperms
- Clade: Monocots
- Clade: Commelinids
- Order: Poales
- Family: Thurniaceae; Engl.

Genera
- Prionium; Thurnia

Synonyms
- Prioniaceae

= Thurniaceae =

Family of flowering plants

The Thurniaceae are a family of flowering plants composed of two genera with four species. The botanical name has been recognized by most taxonomists.

The APG II system, of 2003, also recognizes such a family, and assigns it to the order Poales in the clade commelinids, in the monocots. The family consists of two genera, totalling only a few species, perennial plants of wet habitats in South America and South Africa.

This represents a slight change from the APG system, 1998, which treated the two genera as each constituting their own family (Prioniaceae and Thurniaceae), both placed in the order Poales.

The Cronquist system of 1981 also recognized such a family and placed it in the order Juncales in the subclass Commelinidae in class Liliopsida in division Magnoliophyta.

The Wettstein system, last updated in 1935, placed the family in order Liliiflorae.
