= George Henry Loskiel =

George Henry Loskiel (Latvian: Georgs Heinrihs Loskīls; German: Georg Heinrich Loskiel) (7 November 1740 in Rinda, Latvia – 23 February 1814 in Bethlehem, Pennsylvania) was presiding bishop of the northern district of the American province of the Moravian Church (1802–1811). He was an eloquent preacher and a good writer. For the history of Native Americans important is his work Geschichte der Mission der Evanglischen Bruder unter den Indianern in Nordamerika (Leipzig, 1789) translated into English by Christian Ignatius Latrobe (1758–1836) as History of the Moravian Mission among the North American Indians (London, 1794).

== Life ==
Loskiel was born in the family of Georg Heinrich Loskiel, the Evangelical Lutheran pastor at the parishes of Rinda, Ārlava and Tukums in the Duchy of Courland and Semigallia (now part of Latvia). According to the wish of his father he was educated at the Moravian college and theological seminary in Barby, Germany. In 1765 he was ordained to be a preacher of the Unitas Fratrum, in 1782 he became the deputy of the presiding presbyter Peter Hesse, and in 1785 was appointed the presiding presbyter (Oberpresbyter) of the Moravian Church in Livonia. In 1789, he moved to Saint Petersburg to lead the congregation of the Moravian Brethren in the Russian capital, but very soon returned to Saxony and founded educational establishments in the congregations of Kleinwelka (near Bautzen) and Gnadenfrei (now Piława Górna).

He moved to the United States during the Second Great Awakening in 1801, and was the President of the Direction of Pennsylvanian Congregations and preacher in Bethlehem. In 1802 he was consecrated to the episcopacy, and appointed presiding bishop of the Northern district of the American province of the Moravian Church. He filled the office, with general acceptance, until 1811, when his health failed. In the following year he was elected to the chief executive board of his church at Berthelsdorf, Saxony; but the condition of his health prevented him from leaving America and he died in Bethlehem, Pennsylvania in 1814.

== Notable works ==
- Passions- und Oster-Gesang, 1781
- Geschichte der Mission der Evanglischen Bruder unter den Indianern in Nordamerika. Leipzig, 1789 (History of the Moravian Mission among the North American Indians in three parts (London, 1794) - 13 editions published between 1788 and 1976 in English and held by 315 libraries worldwide
- Etwas für's Herz auf dem Wege zur Ewigkeit. Bautzen, 1801 (Something for the Heart on the Way to Eternity in German) - meditations for every day in the year, which has passed through more than eight editions and still enjoys high repute
- Extempore on a wagon; a metrical narrative of a journey from Bethlehem, Pa., to the Indian town of Goshen, Ohio, in the autumn of 1803 by George Henry Loskiel. Tr. with notes by J. Max Hark. Lancaster, Pa., S. H. Zahm, 1887
- Gebete und Betrachtungen in Versen auf alle Tage des Jahres Reichenbach, 1813
- Sieben Passions-Predigten Berlin: H.H. Wohlgemuth, 1839
