= Kaaimans River Pass =

- Kaaimansgat
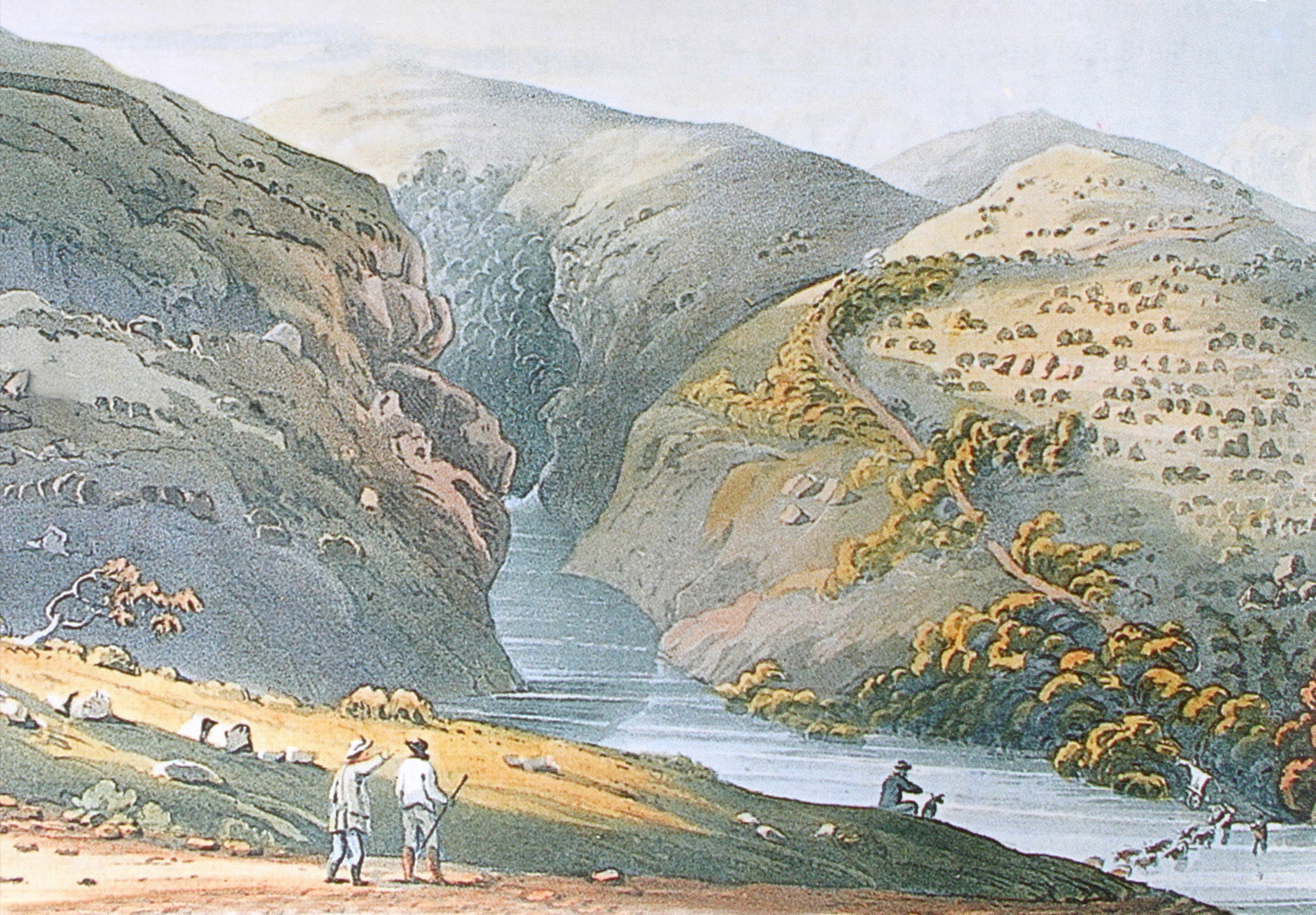
- View of the Kaaimans River from the Mountain pass, by Christian Ignatius Latrobe, 1816.

- Location within South Africa

Location
- Location: Garden Route, Western Cape, South Africa
- Coordinates: 33.58161°S 22.32464°E
- Topo map: 3322

Kaaimans River Pass, is a mountain pass situated in the Western Cape Province of South Africa. It is located above the Kaaimans River on the road between George and Wilderness. The road of this pass, named the Seven Passes Road, was built by Thomas Charles John Bain and his brother-in-law, Adam de Smidt, in 1867, and was used for over one century.

== See also ==
- Kaaimans River
- List of mountain passes of South Africa
