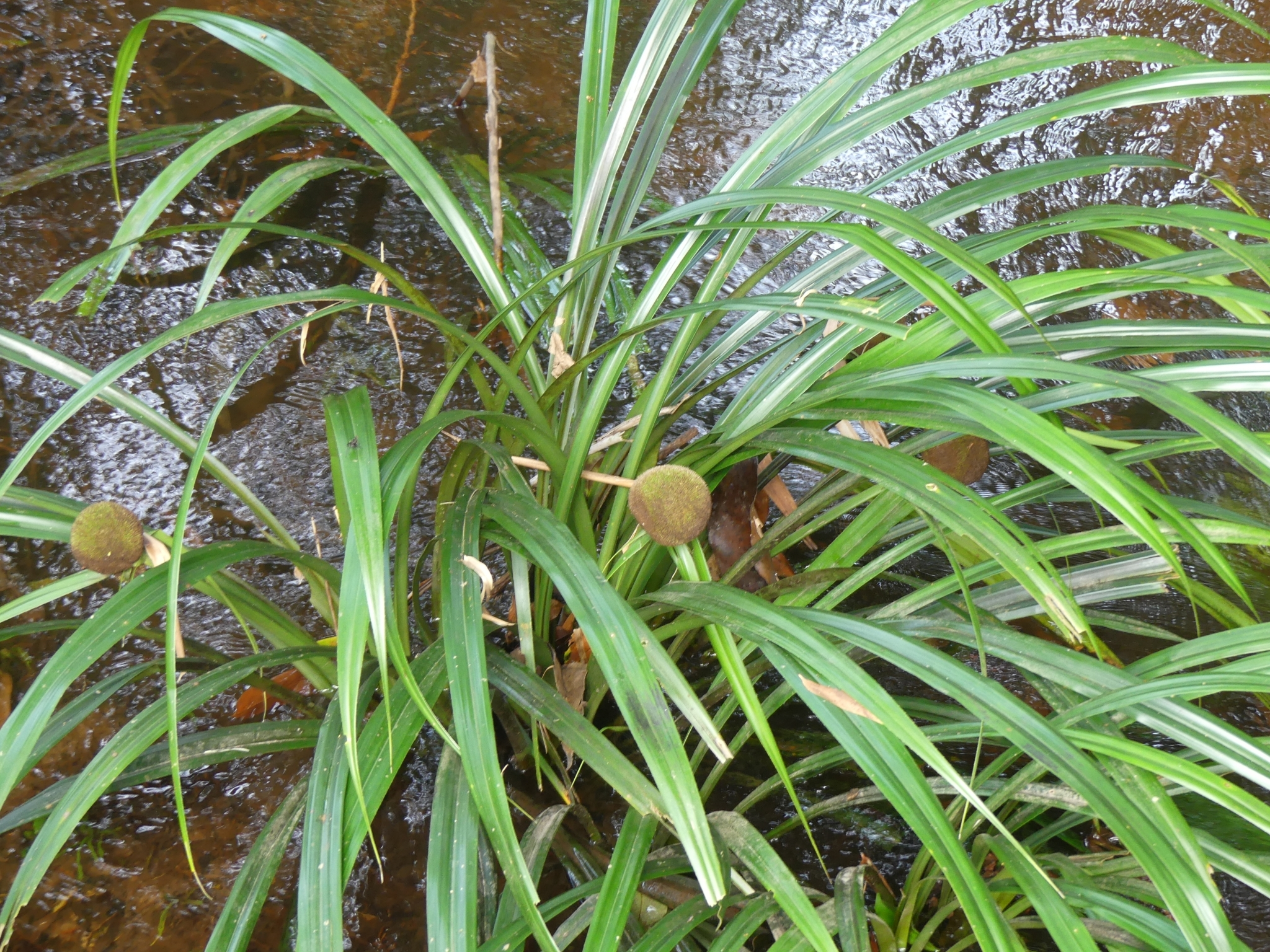
- Thurnia sphaerocephala

Scientific classification
- Kingdom: Plantae
- Clade: Tracheophytes
- Clade: Angiosperms
- Clade: Monocots
- Clade: Commelinids
- Order: Poales
- Family: Thurniaceae
- Genus: Thurnia; Hook.f.

Type species
- Thurnia jenmanii Hook.f.

= Thurnia =

Genus of flowering plants

Thurnia is a group of herbaceous plants described as a genus in 1883.

Thurnia is native to northern South America.

Species

- Thurnia jenmanii Hook.f. - Guyana
- Thurnia polycephala Schnee - SE Colombia, S Venezuela, N Brazil
- Thurnia sphaerocephala (Rudge) Hook.f. - Guyana, Suriname, French Guiana, Colombia, S Venezuela, N Brazil
