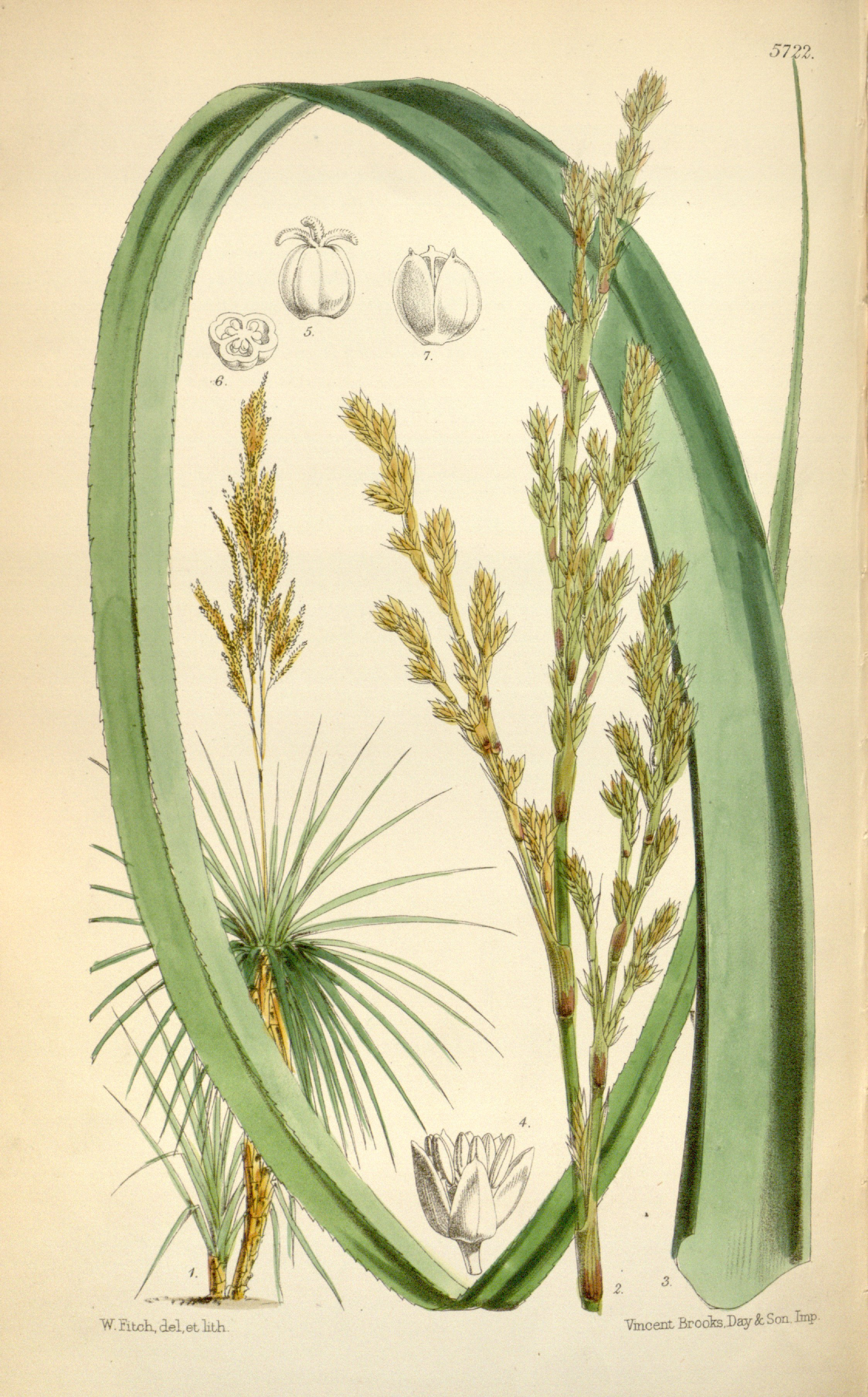

Conservation status
- Least Concern (IUCN 3.1)

Scientific classification
- Kingdom: Plantae
- Clade: Embryophytes
- Clade: Tracheophytes
- Clade: Spermatophytes
- Clade: Angiosperms
- Clade: Monocots
- Clade: Commelinids
- Order: Poales
- Family: Thurniaceae
- Genus: Prionium; E.Mey.
- Species: P. serratum

Binomial name
- Prionium serratum (L.f.) Drège

Synonyms
- Homotypic Synonyms: Juncus serratus L.f.; Heterotypic Synonyms: Acorus palmita Licht.; Prionium palmita E.Mey.

= Prionium =

Genus of aquatic plants

Prionium serratum, the palmiet, is a robust, evergreen, semiaquatic, rhizomatous flowering plant growing to 2 m (6 ft 7 in) in height. It is the only species in the genus Prionium, and is endemic to South Africa (Cape Province and KwaZulu-Natal). Some authors have separated Prionium from the Thurniaceae, putting it instead in its own family, the Prioniaceae.

== Description ==
The stem of P. serratum is up to 100 mm (3.9 in) in diameter and covered with the black, fibrous bases of old spirally arranged leaves, four-ranked or tristichous, as in the closely related family Juncaceae, a family in which it was previously placed - it also has close affinities with the bergpalmiet (Tetraria thermalis) in the Cyperaceae. The strap-like lanceolate leaves are rigid, with a high silica content, narrow, leathery, grey-green, and with toothed margins. The small, brown flowers are on a branched inflorescence about 1 m in length. Plants are hermaphroditic and pollination is anemophilous. The fruit is a dry dehiscent triangular capsule, with three seed chambers and arillate seeds which are hispid (with sclerenchymatous fibres) and winged. The net-like, black fibrous, reticulate leaf sheaths are often found on beaches near rivers with colonies of palmiet (see Gallery). New flower shoots are cooked as vegetables.

== Taxonomy and distribution ==
P. serratum is one of only four species in the family Thurniaceae and the only member of the family native to southern Africa. This species has a disjunct distribution along the southern and south-eastern seaboard from the Western Cape to KwaZulu-Natal on sandstone substrates, growing in dense mats in marshy areas, and in and along streams and rivers. Palmiet wetlands are ecosystems that greatly reduce the erosive damage done by floodwater. When palmiet is removed, streams may become choked by sediment and banks eroded by unchecked floodwater.

Prionium is from the Greek for sawblade, while serratum is Latin for toothed. The name wilde palmit was used by Jan van Riebeeck for this plant, doubtless because of its close resemblance to palmito and the palmettos, and it was first noted by the Swedish botanist Carl Peter Thunberg in about 1772. The name evolved into wilde palmiet and then palmiet. Several rivers in the Western Cape have been named Palmiet River for this species growing along their courses - two of the larger ones are the Palmiet River mouthing between Betty's Bay and Kleinmond, and one having its source just west of Formosa Peak and eventually joining the Keurbooms River.

== Gallery ==
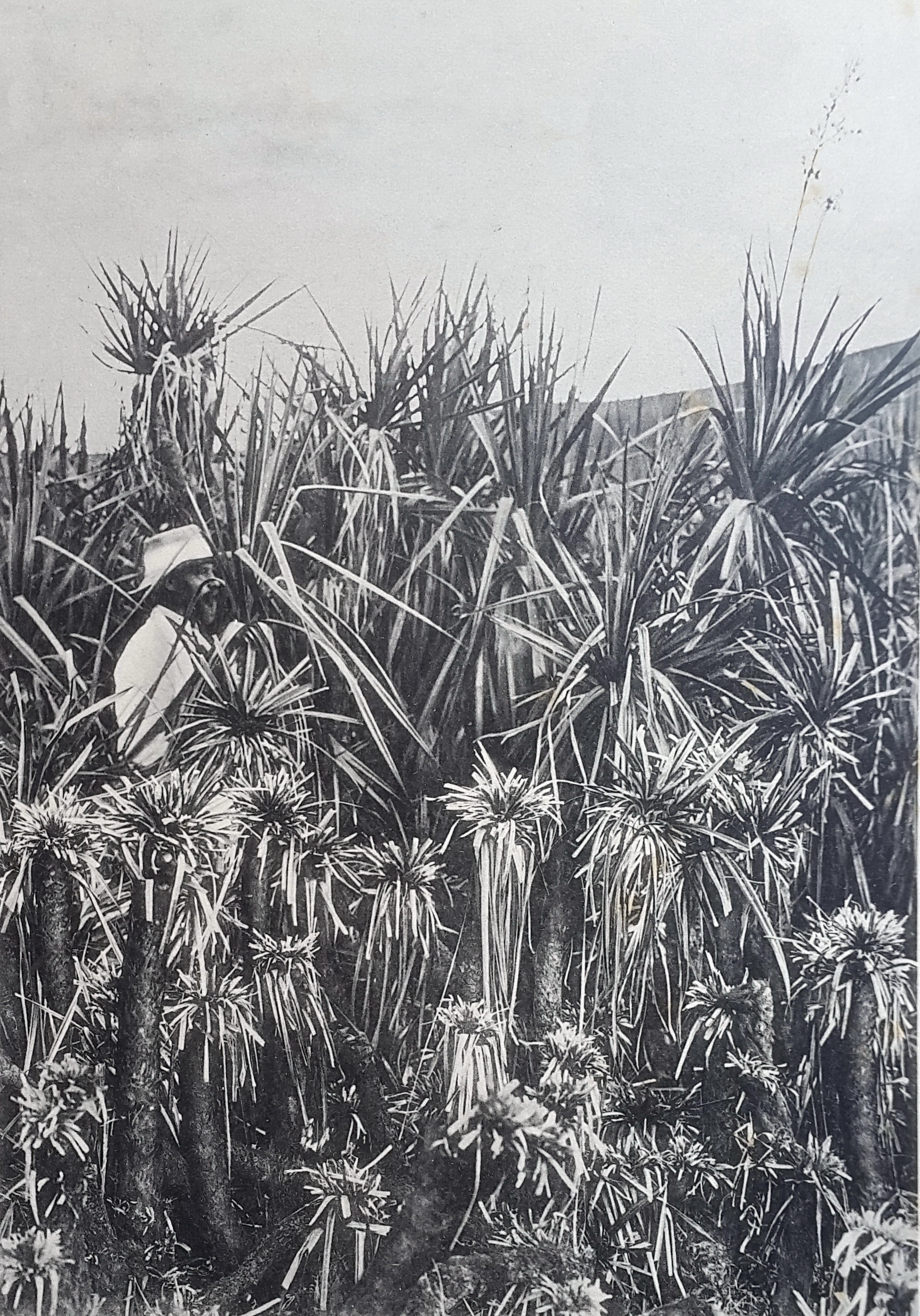

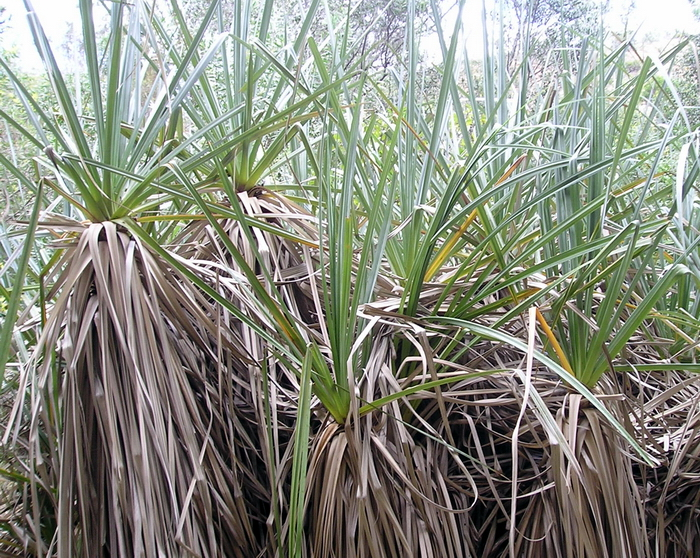

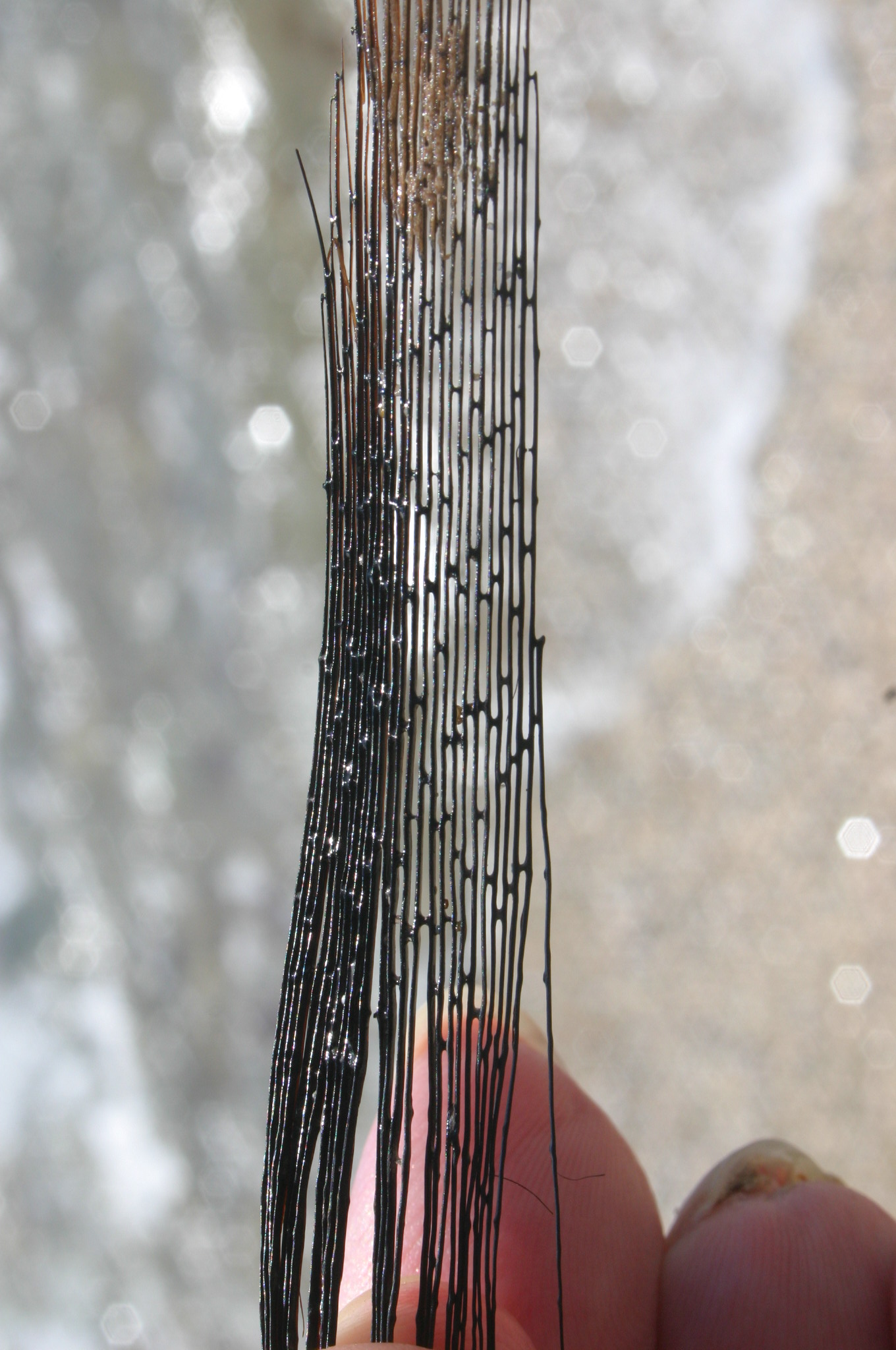

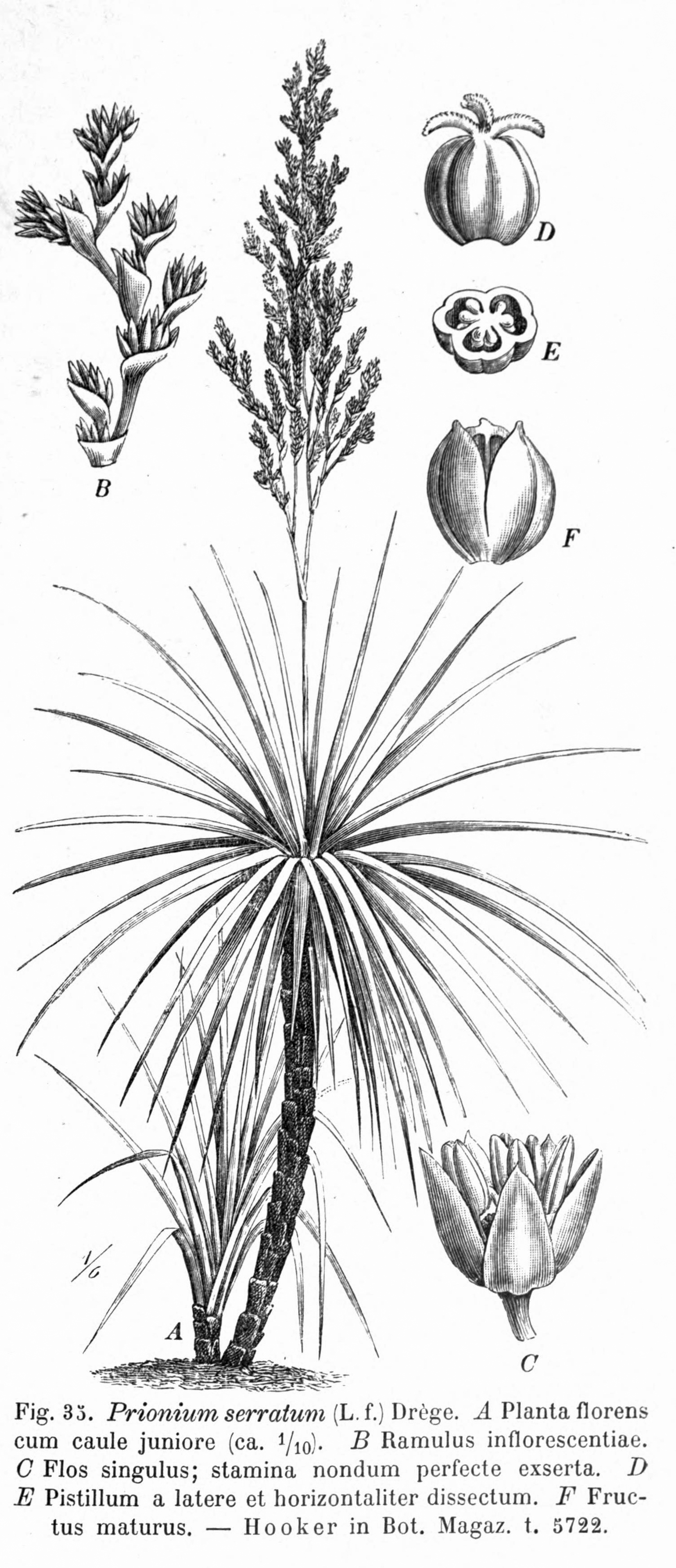

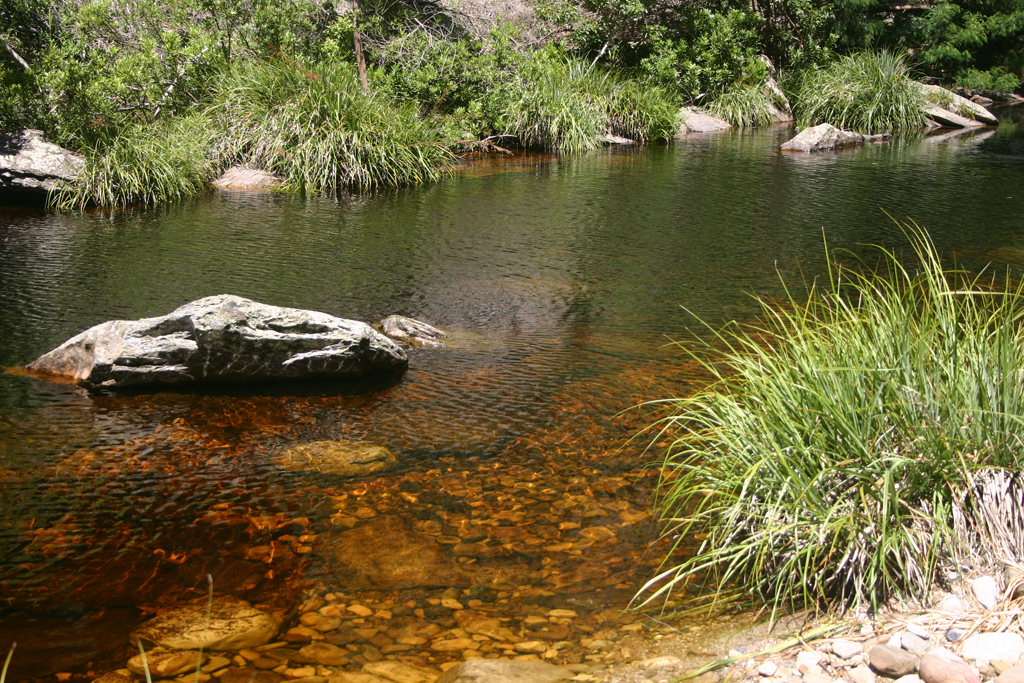
