= John Antes Latrobe =

John Antes Latrobe (1799–1878) was an English cleric and writer on music.

== Life ==
The son of Christian Ignatius Latrobe and his wife Hannah Benigna Sims, he was born in London in 1799; Peter Latrobe (1795–1863) the minister and Charles Joseph La Trobe were brothers. He was named after his father's uncle John Antes.

He received his education at St. Edmund Hall, Oxford, and graduated B.A. in 1826, M.A. 1829. He was ordained deacon in the Church of England by George Henry Law, in 1826, served as curate at Bristol Temple that year, and became chaplain to George Sandford, 3rd Baron Mount Sandford in 1829.

As a curate, Latrobe served also at Melton Mowbray, Tintern, and other places. He became incumbent of St. Thomas's Church, Kendal, a post which he held from 1840 to 1865. In 1858 he was made an honorary canon of Carlisle Cathedral.

Latrobe died, unmarried, at Gloucester, where he had been living in retirement, on 19 November 1878.

== Works ==
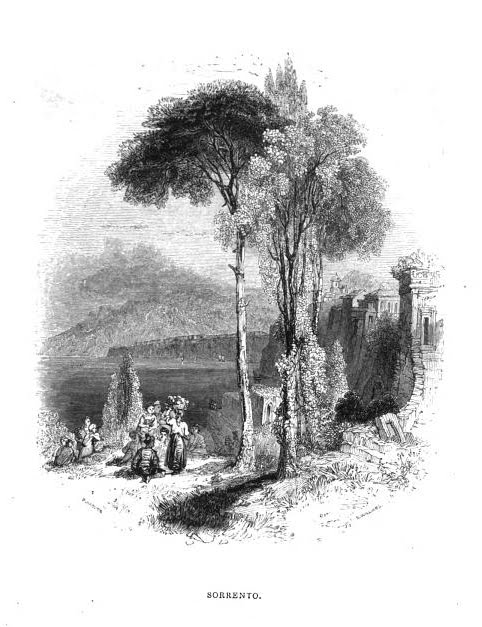
Sorrento, illustration from The Solace of Song, 1837, by John Antes Latrobe

Latrobe was the author of The Music of the Church considered in its various branches, Congregational and Choral, London, 1831. It covers the Anglican church music tradition, as it was before Tractarianism. His other publications included:

- Instructions of Chenaniah: Plain Directions for accompanying the Chant or Psalm Tune, London, 1832;
- Scripture Illustrations, London, 1838; and
- Two volumes of poetry, The Solace of Song, 1837, and Sacred Lays and Lyrics, 1850.

He compiled the Hymn Book used in his church at Kendal, and several of his own hymns were included in it.
