= Christian Ignatius Latrobe =

English clergyman

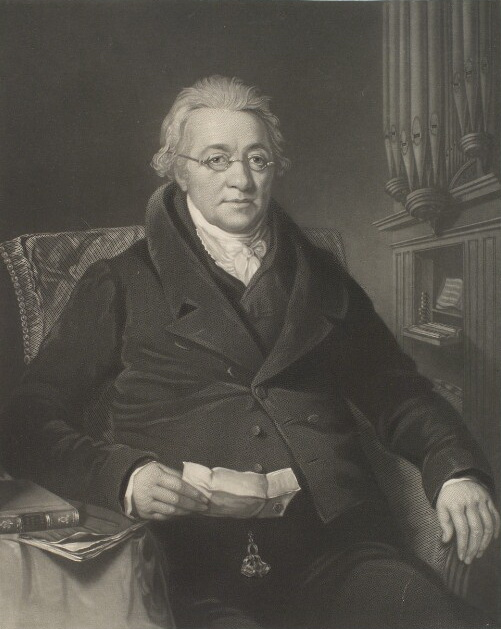
- Christian Ignatius Latrobe, mezzotint by Samuel Bellin, after Thomas Barber

Personal details
- Born: 12 February 1758 Fulneck Moravian Settlement, West Riding of Yorkshire, England, Kingdom of Great Britain
- Died: 6 May 1836 (aged 78) Fairfield, Lancashire, England, United Kingdom of Great Britain and Ireland
- Denomination: Moravian
- Spouse: Hannah Benigna Syms
- Children: 6, including John Antes and Charles Joseph
- Relatives: Benjamin Henry Latrobe (brother)

Christian Ignatius Latrobe (12 February 1758 – 6 May 1836) was an English clergyman of the Moravian Church, as well as an artist, musician and composer. He created a large number of works for, and most famously edited, a Selection of Sacred Music in six volumes between 1806 and 1826, introducing the sacred music of Haydn, Mozart and Pergolesi and other European continental composers who were largely unknown to English audiences.

== Life ==
He was born in the Fulneck Moravian Settlement, near Leeds, to the Reverend Benjamin Latrobe, of Huguenot descent, and the American-born Anna Margaretta Antes. His brother was Benjamin Henry Latrobe, the noted architect responsible for the United States Capitol and the Catholic cathedral of Baltimore, Maryland.

In 1771, Christian Latrobe went to Niesky in the Upper Lusatia region of Saxony in Germany, to attend the Moravian College there. On completion of his training he taught at the high school attached to the college for a while, after which he returned to England and was ordained in 1784.

As a promoter of the missionary activity of the Church, in 1815 Latrobe voyaged to the Cape of Good Hope to visit the Moravian mission stations there. Once there, he journeyed from Genadendal to George, Uitenhage, and the Great Fish River. He planned the founding of a new mission station called Enon on the Witrivier near Kirkwood. He described his journey with coloured illustrations in Journal of a Visit to South Africa in 1815 and 1816: With Some Account of the Missionary Settlements of the United Brethren, Near the Cape of Good Hope. Years after his death, a collection of letters written to each of his children during his South African voyage was published.

Latrobe translated George Henry Loskiel's book "Geschichte der mission der evangelischen Brüder unter den Indianern in Nordamerika" as History of the Mission of the United Brethren Among the Indians in North America in 1794. He also helped Charles Burney by translating material from German for his multi-volume "A General History of Music."

Latrobe often brought newly published music from the Continent to England in the early 19th century. He purchased a number of music scores and oratorios from Breitkopf & Härtel in Leipzig, near Niesky, when they were not published due to a perceived lack of interest. In an 1817 letter to Vincent Novello Latrobe mentioned a conversation with Gottfried Christoph Härtel in Leipzig concerning works "...printed -- and a whole wheelbarrow full of [manuscript] music scores and some good German oratorios which I bought for a trifle." Among these acquisitions may have been a Mozart arrangement of Handel's Judas Maccabaeus (1747) discovered in 2001 in Halifax, West Yorkshire.

Latrobe recalled that not long after Haydn arrived in England in 1790, he called at Latrobe's home. After confirming that he was at the correct place, Haydn asked Mrs. Latrobe "be you his woman?" and spotting a picture of himself said "dat is me – I am Haydn". Mrs. Latrobe hurriedly sent for her husband who was at a house nearby. A fairly close friendship grew out of this meeting and Latrobe became a regular visitor at Haydn's home during his two stays in England.

Latrobe dedicated a set of three piano sonatas to Joseph Haydn. He also wrote clarinet concertos (now lost), duets and arias, and more than a hundred vocal pieces, among which were "Lord of Life Now Sweetly Slumber", "How Shall a Mortal Song Aspire" (from his cantata "Dawn of Glory"), "Psalm 51" ("Miserere mei Deus") and "We Praise Thee, Oh God". The bulk of Latrobe's musical works reside in Moravian Church archives in Herrnhut, Germany, Christiansfeld, Denmark, and at the Moravian Music Foundation in Winston-Salem, NC and Bethlehem, PA. A number of works attributed to him reside at the Warsaw University Library, but several may be compositions by his brother Johann Friedrich (Boneval) de La Trobe (1769-1845).

He died in the Fairfield Moravian Settlement on 6 May 1836, at the age of 78, and was buried there.

== Works ==
- Trauer-Cantate auf das Ableben Johann Christian Friedrichs, Freyherrn von Wattewille, in Musik gesezt ... in einen Klavierauszug gebracht ... von Johannes Sörensen (Rudolstadt, Hof-Buchdruckerei, 1786) RISM 990036863
- Sonatinas [Es, C, F, B, D, h] for the piano forte (London, F. Bland, 1787)RISM 991029685
- Hymn-tunes [a 4 v] sung in the Church of the United Brethren (London, J. Bland; for the author)RISM 990036851
- Three sonatas [A, d, B] for the piano forte ... op. III [Dedicated to Haydn] (London, J. Bland; for the author, 1791)RISM 990036866
- Dies irae, &c., an ancient hymn on the Last Judgment, translated from the Latin by the ... Earl of Roscommon ... adapted for the piano forte and four voices (London, for the author, 1799) RISM 990036852
- Six airs [Sing-St./pf], the words on serious subjects ... set to music (London, Robert Birchall (Thompson), n.d.)RISM 990036865
- The dawn of glory. A hymn on the bliss of the redeemed at the Last Day ... adapted for the piano forte & voices (London, Robert Birchall; for the author, 1803)RISM 990036856
- Anthem for the celebration of the jubilee, or commencement of the fiftieth year of the reign of our most gracious sovereign George the Third, October 25, 1809. The words taken from the XXth & XXIst Psalms : for four voices with accompanyments ... adapted for the piano forte and voices (London: Printed for the author ... sold also by R. Birchall, 1809)RISM 990036858
- Anthems for 1, 2 or more voices, performed in the Church of the United Brethren ... (London, s.n., 1811)RISM 990036848
- Meditation at the grave of a beloved son, set to music [Sing-St./pf] (London, s.n., 1812) RISM 990036859
- Miserere mei deus! Psalm LI ... adapted for the organ or piano forte and voices (London, Birchall; L. B. Seely; Chappell & Co.; for the author, 1814)RISM 990036860
- Te Deum Laudamus, for four voices, accompanied by various instruments ... adapted for the piano forte or organ (London, Holborn; Lonsdale; L. B. Seely; Chappell, 1814)RISM 990036861
- Anthem for Maundy Thursday, sung at Lichtenfels [Greenland], one of the settlements of the United Brethren [s.l., s.n.]RISM 992005934
- Anthems for One, Two, or more Voices Performed in the Church of the United Brethren, Collected and the Instrumental Parts adapted for the Organ or Piano Forte, Composed by Various Authors (London, 1811)
- In memory of a beloved sister, who died at Bedford, July 27, 1824 [Sing-St./pf] (London, E. Lomax; for I. H. Foster)RISM 990036862
- Original anthems for one, two, or more voices, adapted for private devotion or public worship, composed and the accompaniments arranged for the piano forte or organ (London, for the author, 1828 & 1830)RISM 990036850
- Hymn-Tunes Sung in the Church of the United Brethren, Collected by Chrn. Igns. LaTrobe. A new Edition revised & corrected with an Appendix (London, 1826)

== Family ==
Christian Latrobe married Hannah Benigna Syms (28 October 1758 – 18 April 1824). Their children were:

- Charlotte Louisa Latrobe (1794–1879)
- Peter Latrobe (15 February 1795 – 24 September 1863), Bishop of the Moravian Church, married firstly Mary Louisa Foster on 27 December 1825, had issue, and secondly Jeanetta Margaret Brett
- Anna Agnes Latrobe (1796–1832)
- John Antes Latrobe (1799–1878), writer on music, unmarried
- Charles Joseph La Trobe (20 March 1801 – 4 December 1875), Lieutenant-Governor of Victoria, married firstly Sophie de Montmollin (died 30 January 1854) on 16 September 1835 in Bern, Switzerland, and secondly Rose Isabelle de Montmollin,
- Frederick Benjamin Latrobe (1803 – 11 December 1842), married Elizabeth Scott.

== Illustrations by Latrobe from Journal of a Visit to South Africa ==
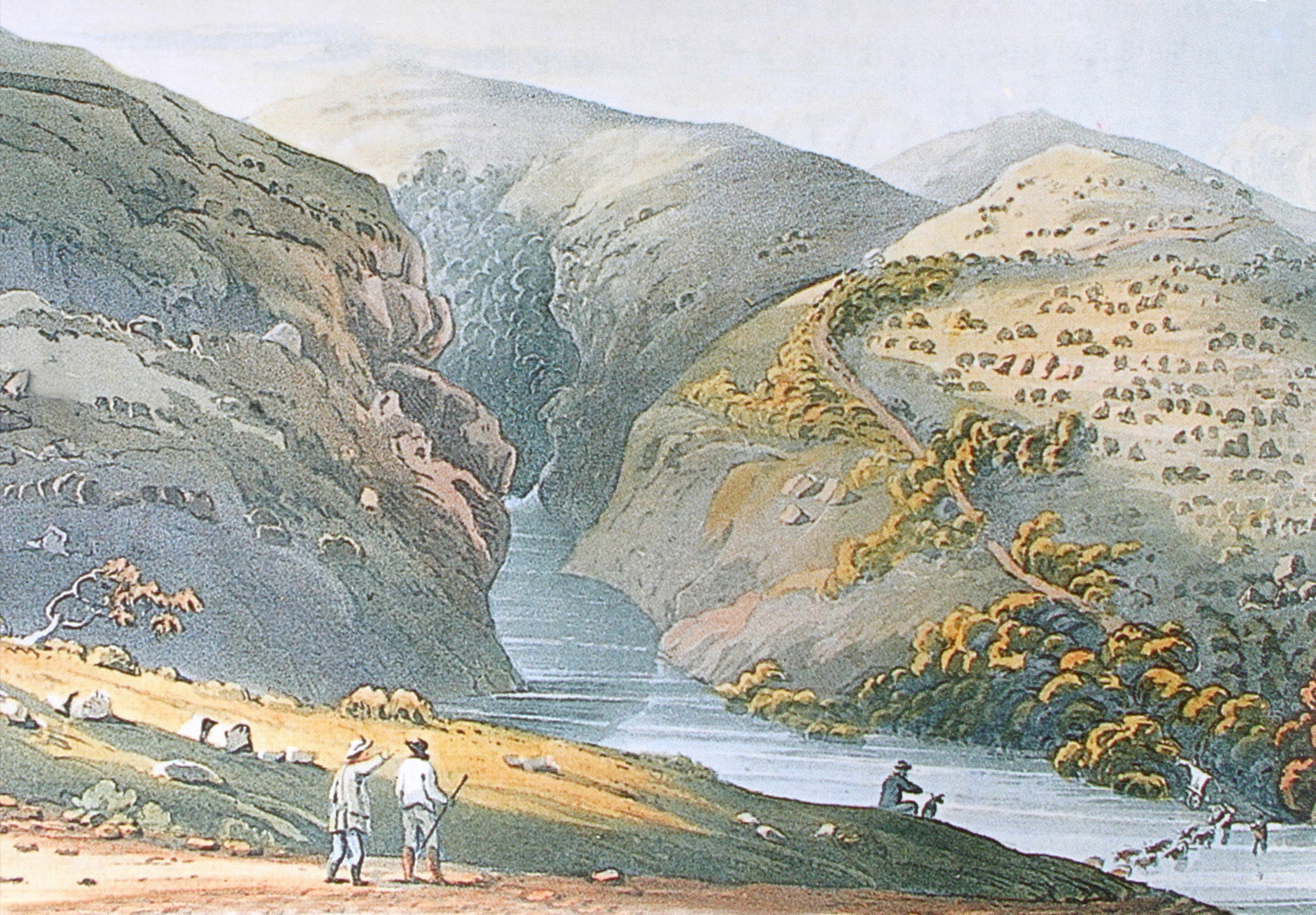
Kaaimansgat Pass near George, South Africa. 1816

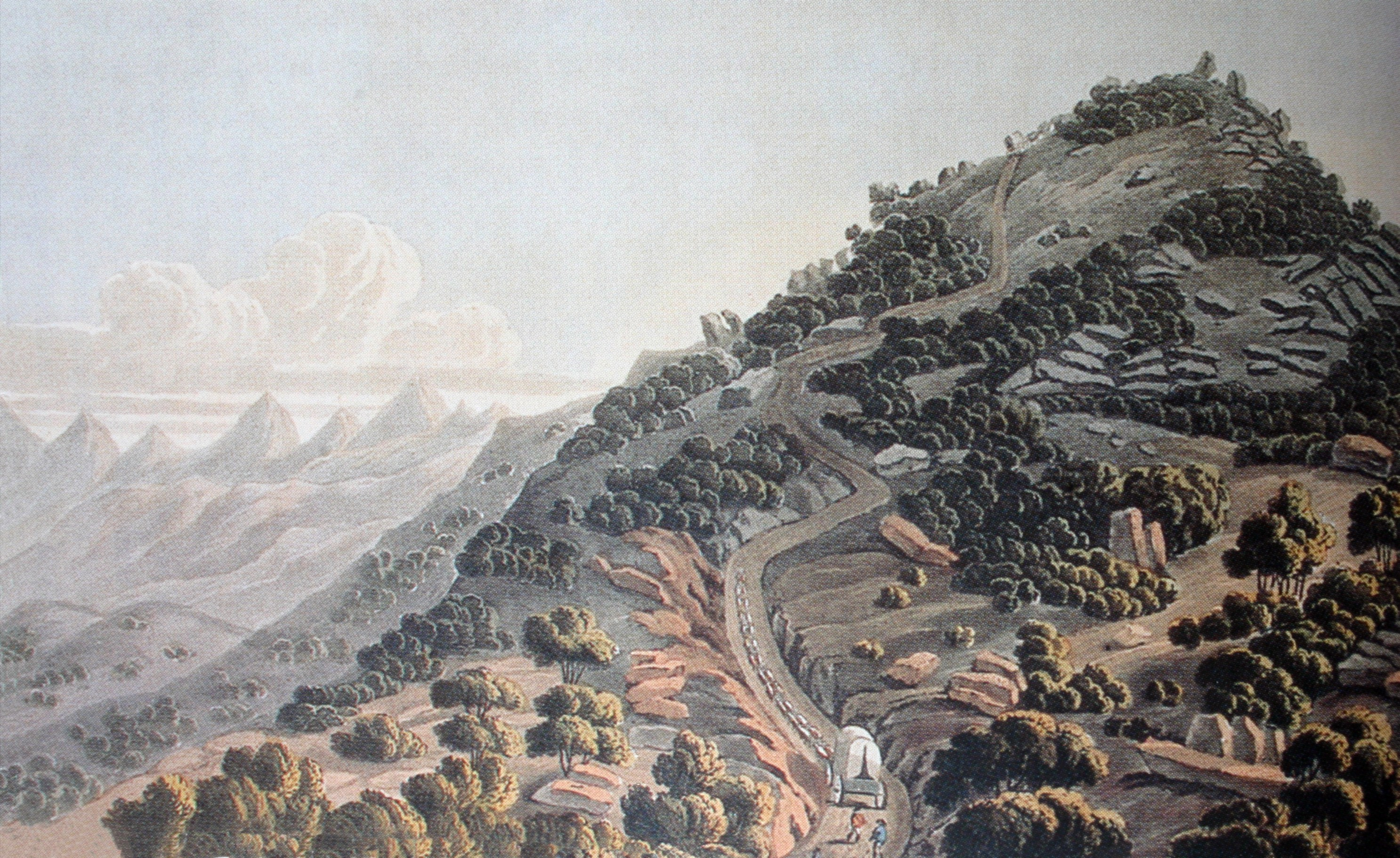
Paardekop Pass near Plettenberg Bay, South Africa. 1816

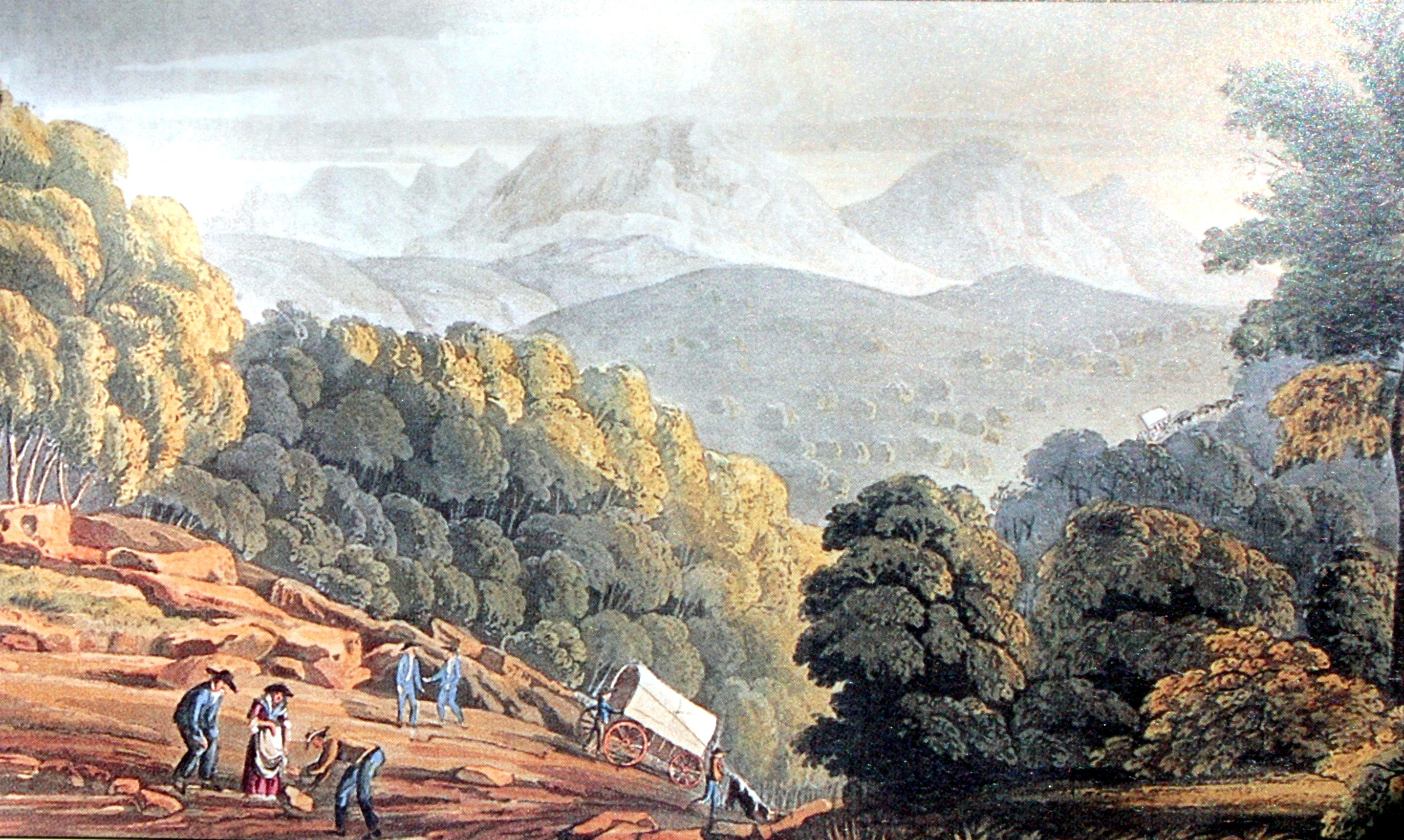
The Trek-aan-Touw approach east of George, South Africa. 1816
