= Wilderness, South Africa =

Wilderness Wildernis
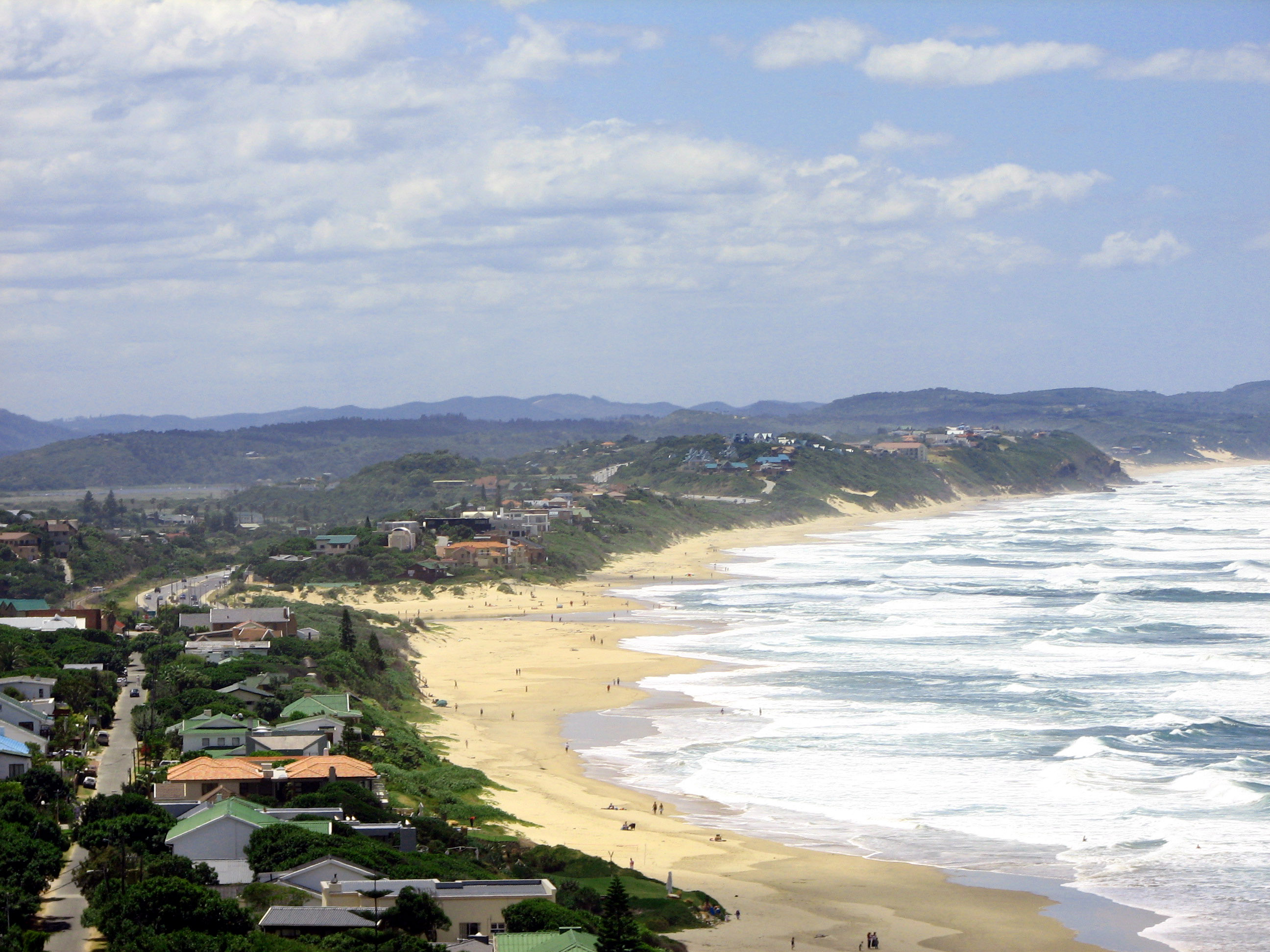
- The town of Wilderness from the Kaaiman's River Pass incline

- Location within Western Cape Location within South Africa
- Coordinates: 33°59′S 22°35′E
- Country: South Africa
- Province: Western Cape
- District: Garden Route
- Municipality: George

Area
  - Total: 36.97 km^{2} (14.27 sq mi)

Population (2011)
  - Total: 6,164
  - Density: 166.7/km^{2} (431.8/sq mi)

Racial makeup (2011)
  - Black African: 12.0%
  - Coloured: 47.2%
  - Indian/Asian: 0.6%
  - White: 38.5%
  - Other: 1.8%

First languages (2011)
  - Afrikaans: 68.5%
  - English: 23.7%
  - Xhosa: 4.9%
  - Other: 2.9%
- Time zone: UTC+2 (SAST)
- Postal code (street): 6560
- PO box: 6560

Wilderness is a seaside town on the Garden Route of the southern Cape in South Africa. It is situated a short distance to the east from the city of George, on the N2 down the Kaaiman's River Pass.

The area around Wilderness has yielded significant palaeoclimatological data on the prehistoric climate of South Africa. Sediment core data from the nearby coastal lake Eilandvlei indicate higher aridity relative to the present day during the intervals spanning ~8,900-7,900 years BP and ~6,400-3,000 years BP, whereas the interval from 7,900 to 6,400 years BP was relatively moist and similar to the present day.

The town is also known for having been both the retirement and death place of P. W. Botha, who served as Prime Minister of South Africa from 1978 to 1984 and as the first executive State President of South Africa from 1984 until his resignation in 1989.

== Gallery ==
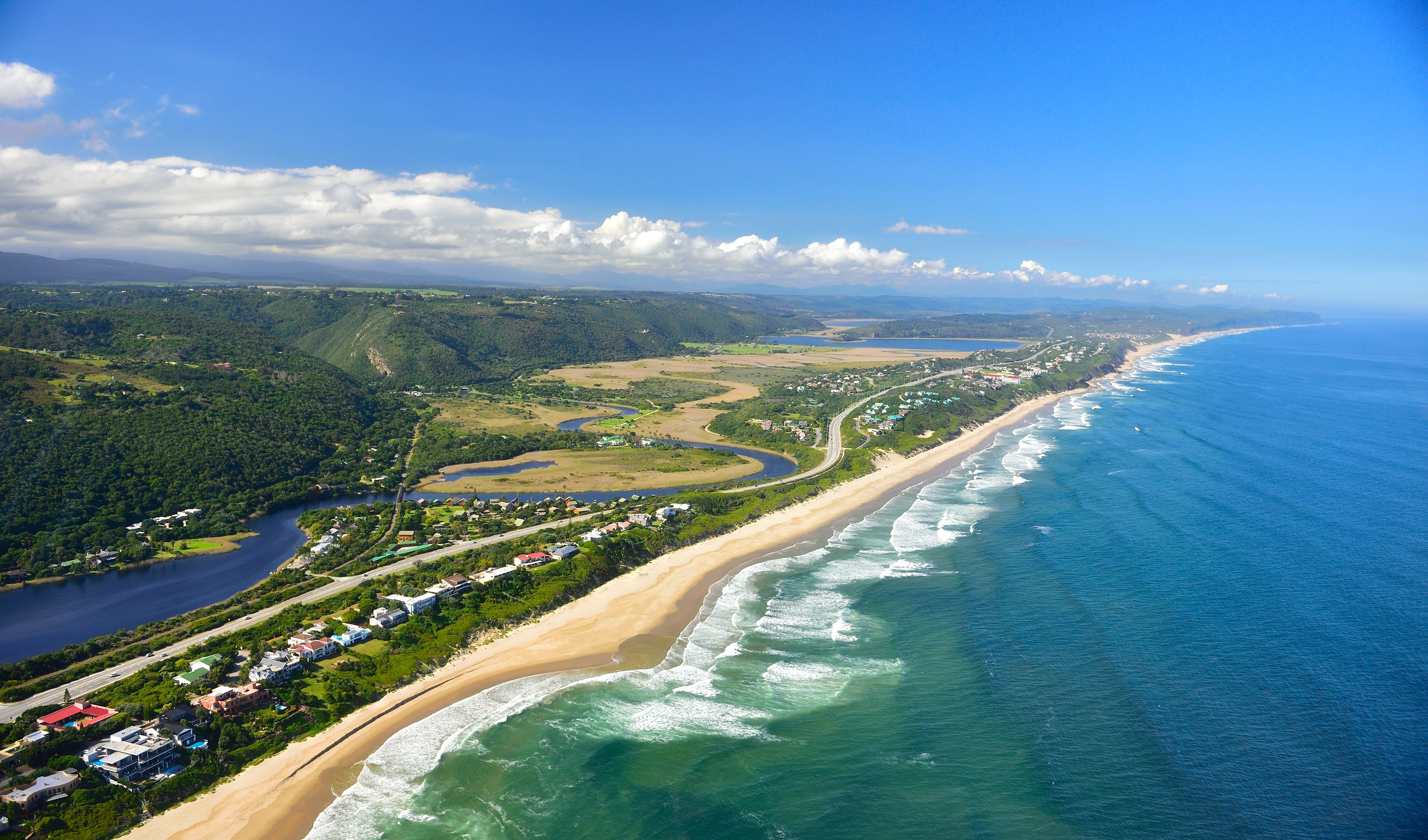
Aerial view of the Touw River & the N2

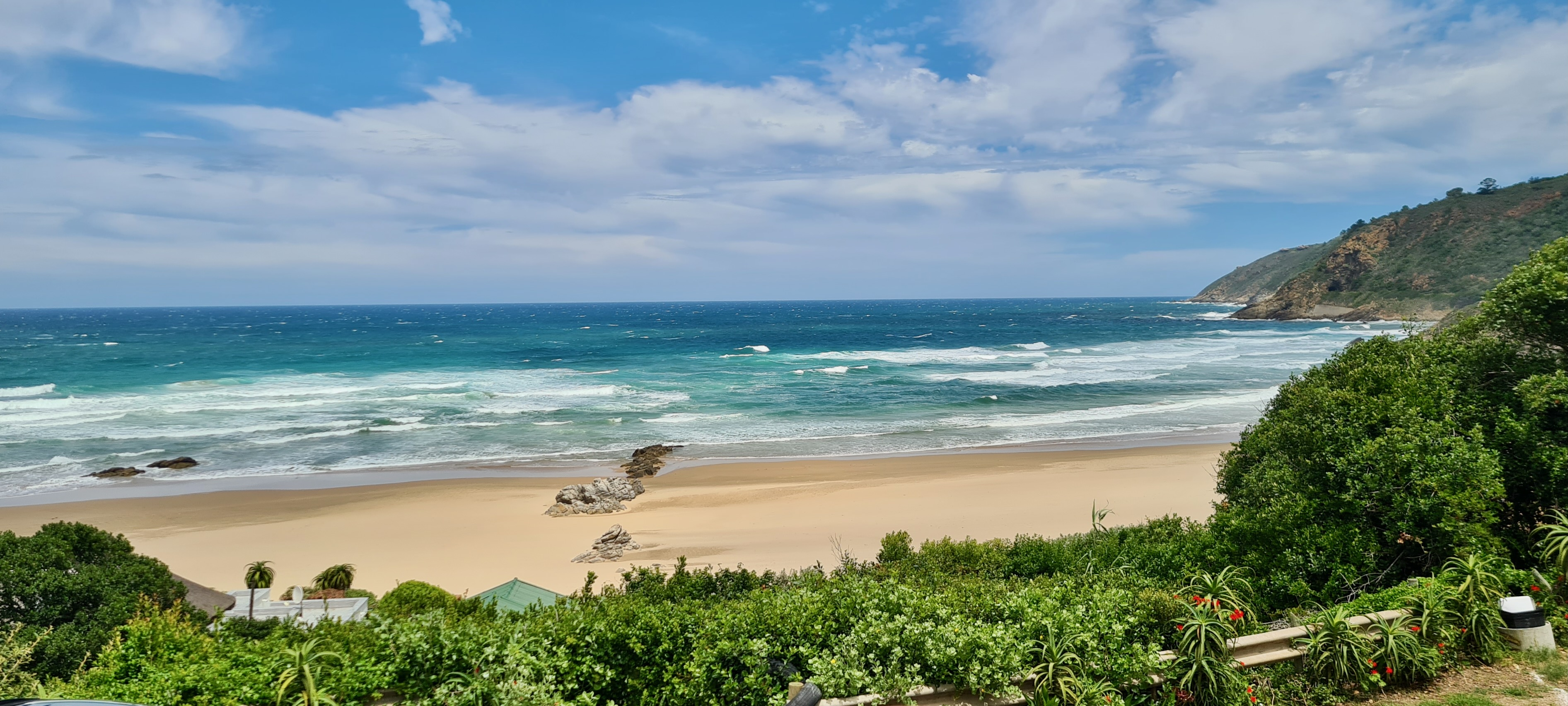
Wilderness Beach

== In media ==
Tuiskoms, a 2025 Netflix original drama series in Afrikaans is set and filmed in the town.
