= Lawn =

Area of land planted with grasses and similar plants

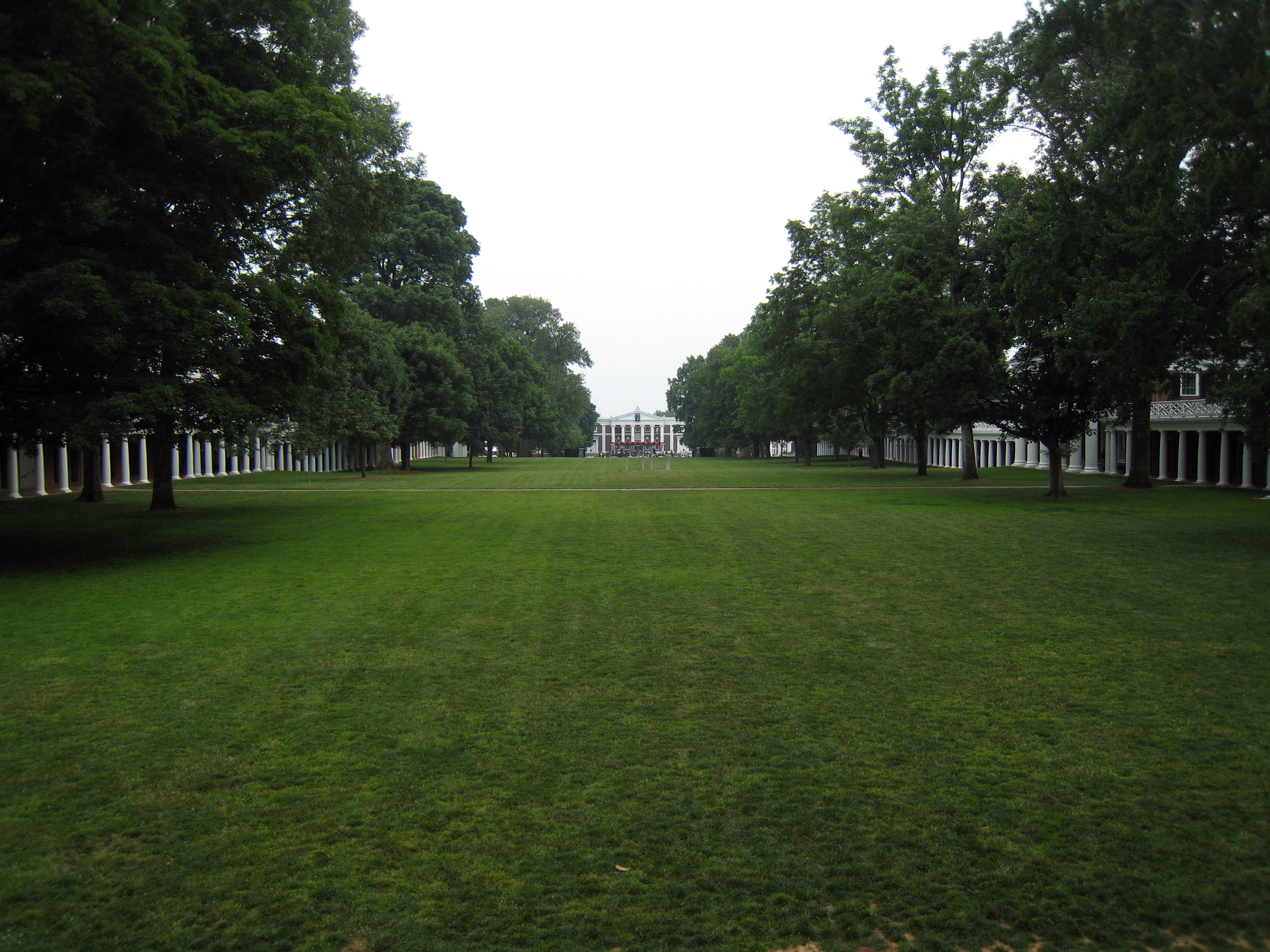
The Lawn at the University of Virginia, facing south

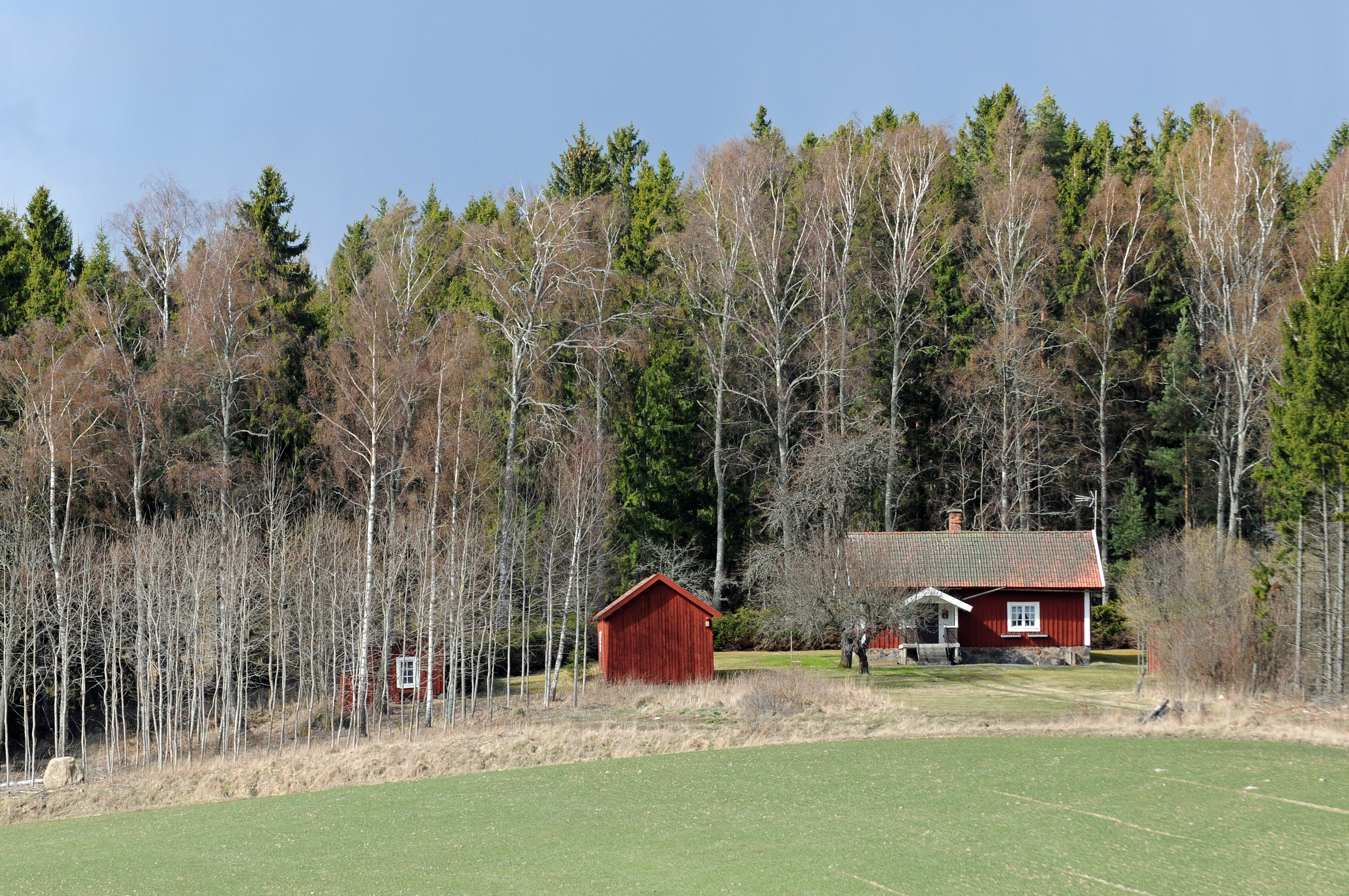
The lawn of a small summerhouse

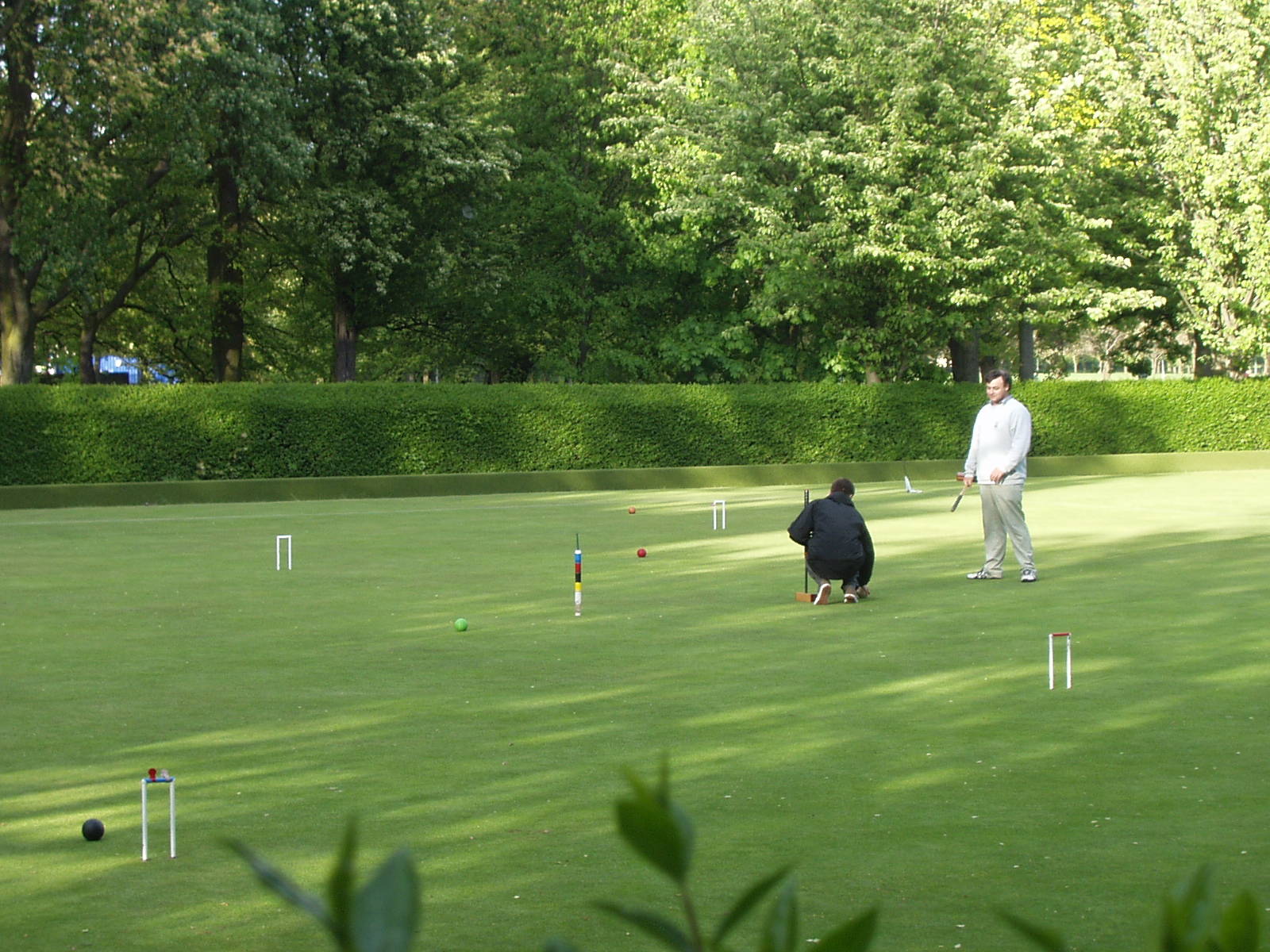
A croquet lawn at a club in Edinburgh, Scotland

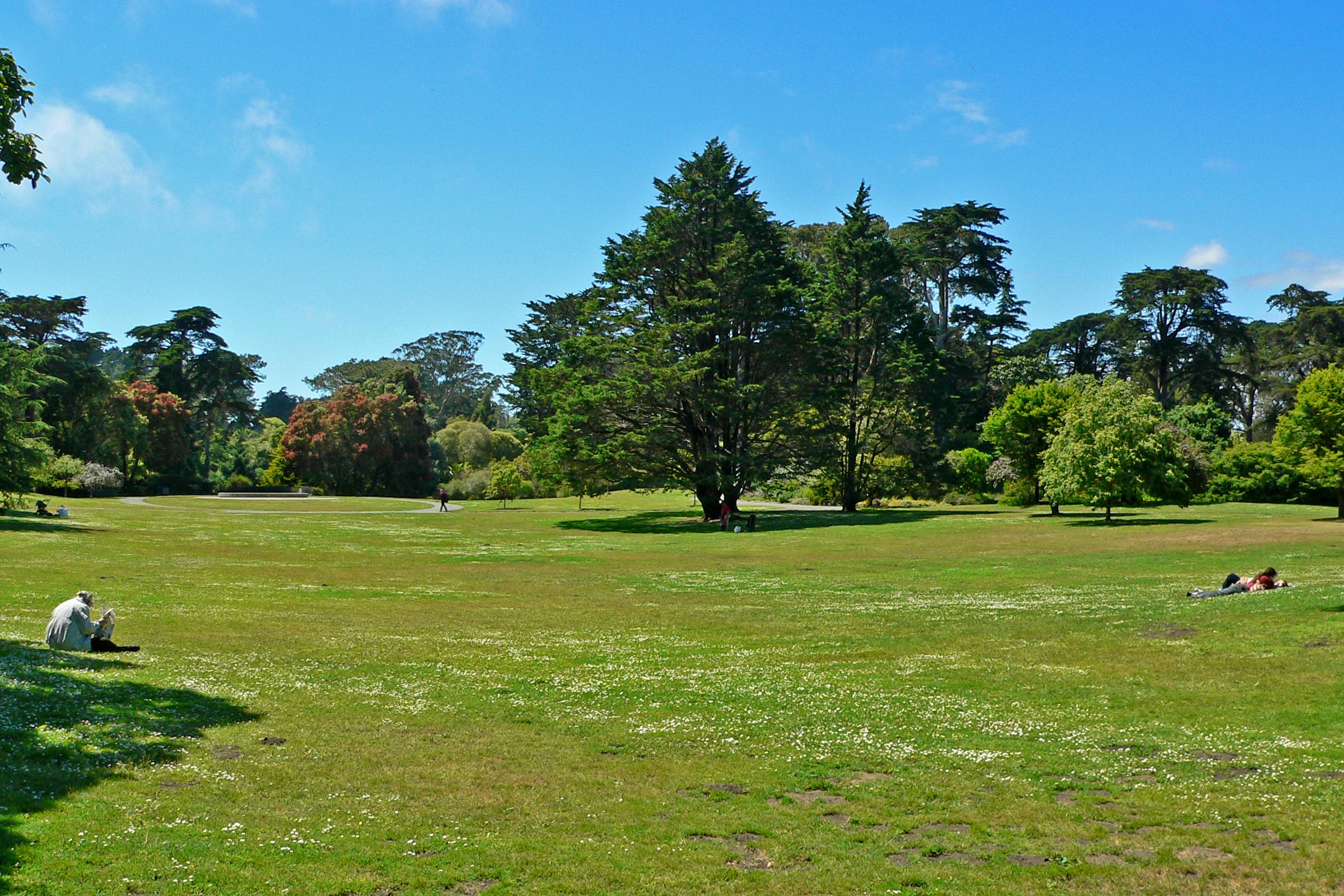
San Francisco Botanical Garden lawn, United States

A lawn (/lɔːn/) is an area of soil-covered land planted with grasses and other durable plants such as clover which is maintained at a short height with a lawn mower (or sometimes grazing animals) and used for aesthetic and recreational purposes. It is also commonly referred to as part of a garden.

Lawns are usually composed only of grass species, subject to weed and pest control, maintained in a green color (e.g., by watering), and are regularly mowed to ensure an acceptable length. Lawns are commonly used around houses, apartments, commercial buildings and offices and many city parks also have large lawn areas. In recreational contexts, the specialised names turf, parade, pitch, field or green may be used, depending on the sport and the continent.

The term "lawn", referring to a managed grass space, dates to at least the 16th century. With suburban expansion, the lawn has become culturally ingrained in some areas of the world as part of the desired household aesthetic. However, awareness of the negative environmental impact of this idea is growing. In some jurisdictions where there are water shortages, local government authorities are encouraging alternatives to lawns to reduce water use. Researchers in the United States have noted that suburban lawns are "biological deserts" that are contributing to a "continental-scale ecological homogenization." Lawn maintenance practices also cause biodiversity loss in surrounding areas. Some forms of lawn, such as tapestry lawns, are designed partly for biodiversity and pollinator support.

== Etymology ==
Lawn derives from Middle English launde, a borrowing from Old French lande (meaning "heath", "clearing"), of either Germanic or Gaulish origin. The word shares an origin with land, and its first recorded use with the meaning of "ground with mown grass" was in the 18th century.

== History ==
=== Origins ===
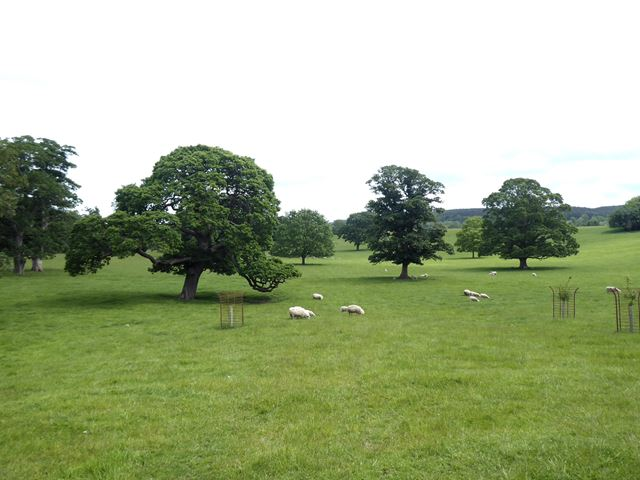
Classic English landscaped parkland: short, springy turf with spaced trees. Sheep keep the greensward closely-cropped. In Britain, raising wool for export was very profitable, and parkland trees provided grown crooks valuable in shipbuilding. This profitable landscape became associated with the landed gentry.

Areas of grass grazed regularly by rabbits, horses or sheep over a long period often form a very low, tight sward similar to a modern lawn. This was the original meaning of the word "lawn", and the term can still be found in place names. Some forest areas where extensive grazing is practiced still have these seminatural lawns. For example, in the New Forest, England, such grazed areas are common, and are known as lawns, for example Balmer Lawn.

Lawns may have originated as grassed enclosures within early medieval settlements used for communal grazing of livestock, as distinct from fields reserved for agriculture. Low, mown-meadow areas may also have been valued because they allowed those inside an enclosed fence or castle to view those approaching. The early lawns were not always distinguishable from pasture fields. The damp climate of maritime Western Europe in the north made lawns possible to grow and manage. They were not a part of gardens in most other regions and cultures of the world until contemporary influence.

In 1100s Britain, low-growing area of grasses and meadow flowers were grazed or scythed to keep them short, and used for sport. Lawn bowling, which began in the 12th or 13th century, required short turf.

The first known documentation of establishing grass using sod instead of seed comes from a Japanese text of 1159.

Lawns became popular with the aristocracy in northern Europe from the Middle Ages onward. In the 1400s, open expanses of low grasses appear in paintings of public and private areas; by the 1500s, such areas were found in the gardens of the wealthy across northern and central Europe. Public meadow areas, kept short by sheep, were used for new sports such as cricket, soccer, and golf. The word "laune" is first attested in 1540 from the Old French lande "heath, moor, barren land; clearing". It initially described a natural opening in a woodland. In the 1600s, "lawn" came to mean a grassy stretch of untilled land, and by mid-century, there were publications on seeding and transplanting sod. In the 1700s, "lawn" came to mean specifically a mown stretch of meadow.

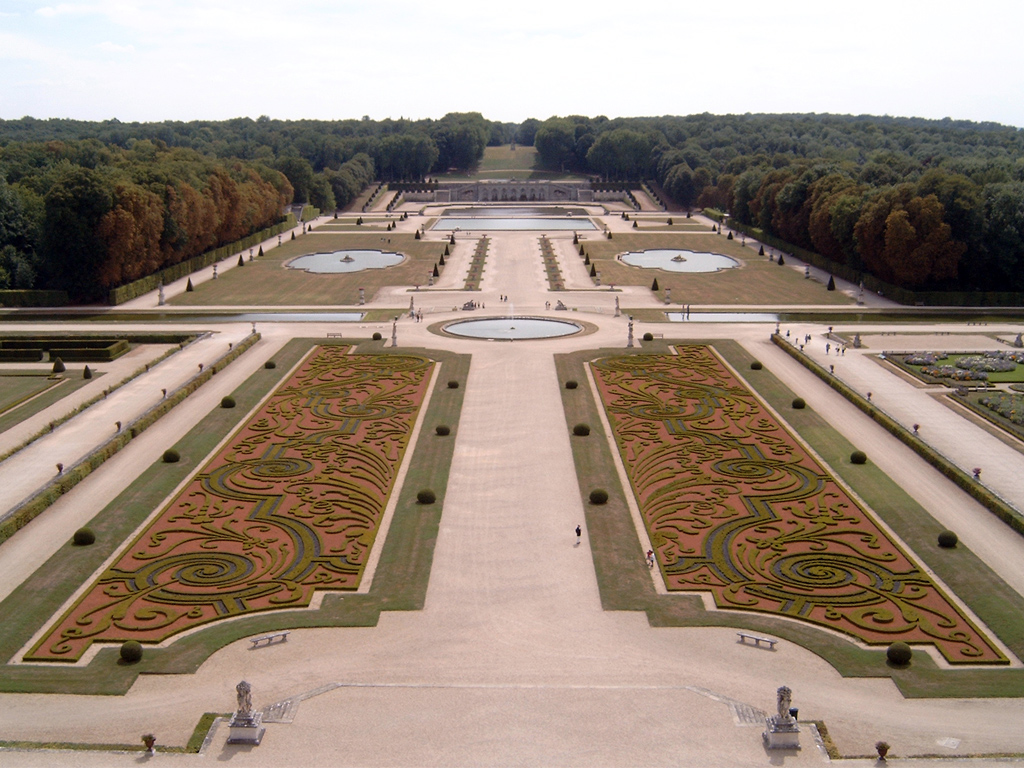
Gardens of the Château de Vaux-le-Vicomte, designed by André Le Nôtre at Maincy

Lawns similar to those of today first appeared in France and England in the 1700s when André Le Nôtre designed the gardens of the Palace of Versailles that included a small area of grass called the tapis vert, or "green carpet", which became a common feature of French gardens. Large, mown open spaces became popular in Europe and North America. The lawn was influenced by later 1700s trends replicating the romantic aestheticism of grassy pastoralism from Italian landscape paintings.

Before the invention of mowing machines in 1830, lawns were managed very differently. They were an element of wealthy estates and manor houses, and in some places were maintained by labor-intensive scything and shearing (for hay or silage). They were also pasture land maintained through grazing by sheep or other livestock.

=== The English lawn ===
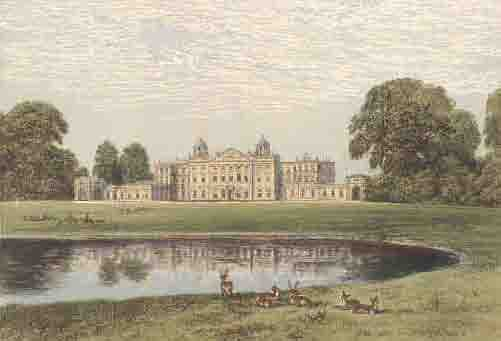
Capability Brown's landscape design at Badminton House

It was not until the 17th and 18th century that the garden and the lawn became a place created first as walkways and social areas. They were made up of meadow plants, such as camomile, a particular favourite (see camomile lawn). In the early 17th century, the Jacobean epoch of gardening began; during this period, the closely cut "English" lawn was born. By the end of this period, the English lawn was a symbol of status of the aristocracy and gentry.

In the early 18th century, landscape gardening for the aristocracy entered a golden age, under the direction of William Kent and Lancelot "Capability" Brown. They refined the English landscape garden style with the design of natural, or "romantic", estate settings for wealthy Englishmen. Brown, remembered as "England's greatest gardener", designed over 170 parks, many of which still endure. His influence was so great that the contributions to the English garden made by his predecessors Charles Bridgeman and William Kent are often overlooked.

His work still endures at Croome Court (where he also designed the house), Blenheim Palace, Warwick Castle, Harewood House, Bowood House, Milton Abbey (and nearby Milton Abbas village), in traces at Kew Gardens and many other locations. His style of smooth undulating lawns which ran seamlessly to the house and meadow, clumps, belts and scattering of trees and his serpentine lakes formed by invisibly damming small rivers, were a new style within the English landscape, a "gardenless" form of landscape gardening, which swept away almost all the remnants of previous formally patterned styles. His landscapes were fundamentally different from what they replaced, the well-known formal gardens of England which were criticised by Alexander Pope and others from the 1710s.

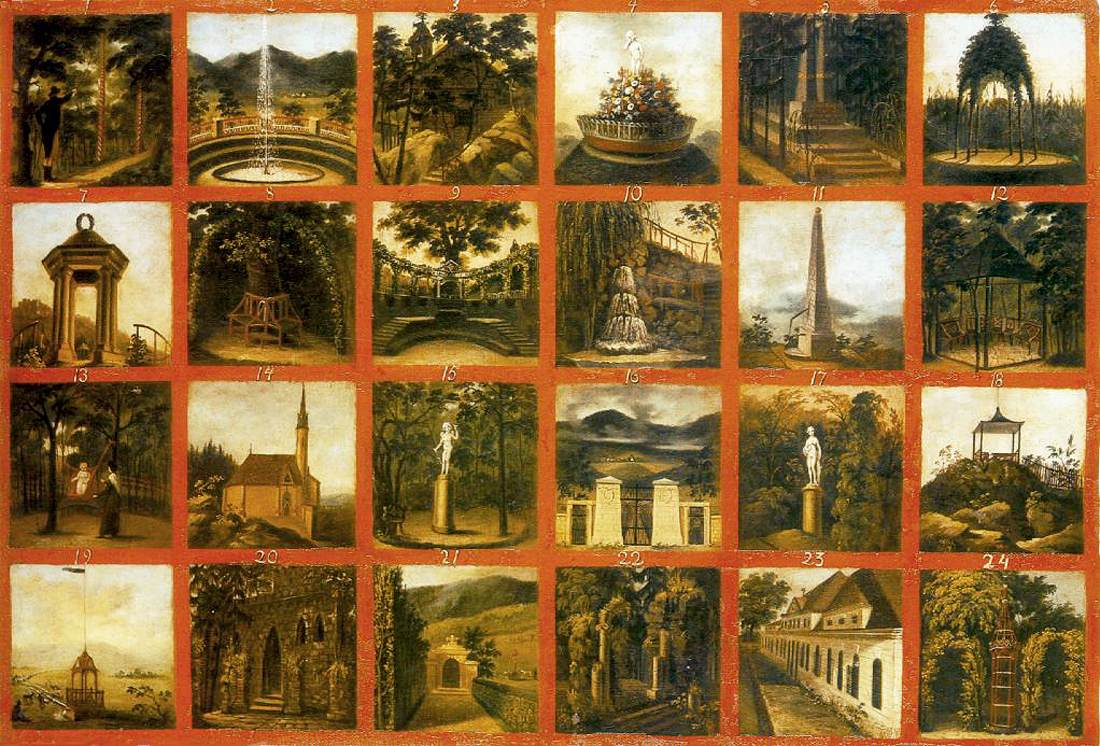
1803 painting of the main elements of the English landscape garden

The open "English style" of parkland first spread across Britain and Ireland, and then across Europe, such as the garden à la française being replaced by the French landscape garden. By this time, the word "lawn" in England had semantically shifted to describe a piece of a garden covered with grass and closely mown.

=== In North America ===
Wealthy families in America during the late 18th century also began mimicking English landscaping styles. British settlers in North America imported an affinity for landscapes in the style of the English lawn. However, early in the colonization of the continent, environments with thick, low-growing, grass-dominated vegetation were rare in the eastern part of the continent, enough so that settlers were warned that it would be difficult to find land suitable for grazing cattle. In 1780, the Shaker community began the first industrial production of high-quality grass seed in North America, and a number of seed companies and nurseries were founded in Philadelphia. The increased availability of these grasses meant they were in plentiful supply for parks and residential areas, not just livestock.

Thomas Jefferson has long been given credit for being the first person to attempt an English-style lawn at his estate, Monticello, in 1806, but many others had tried to emulate English landscaping before he did. Over time, an increasing number towns in New England began to emphasize grass spaces. Many scholars link this development to the romantic and transcendentalist movements of the 19th century. These green commons were also heavily associated with the success of the Revolutionary War and often became the homes of patriotic war memorials after the Civil War ended in 1865.

=== Middle class pursuit ===
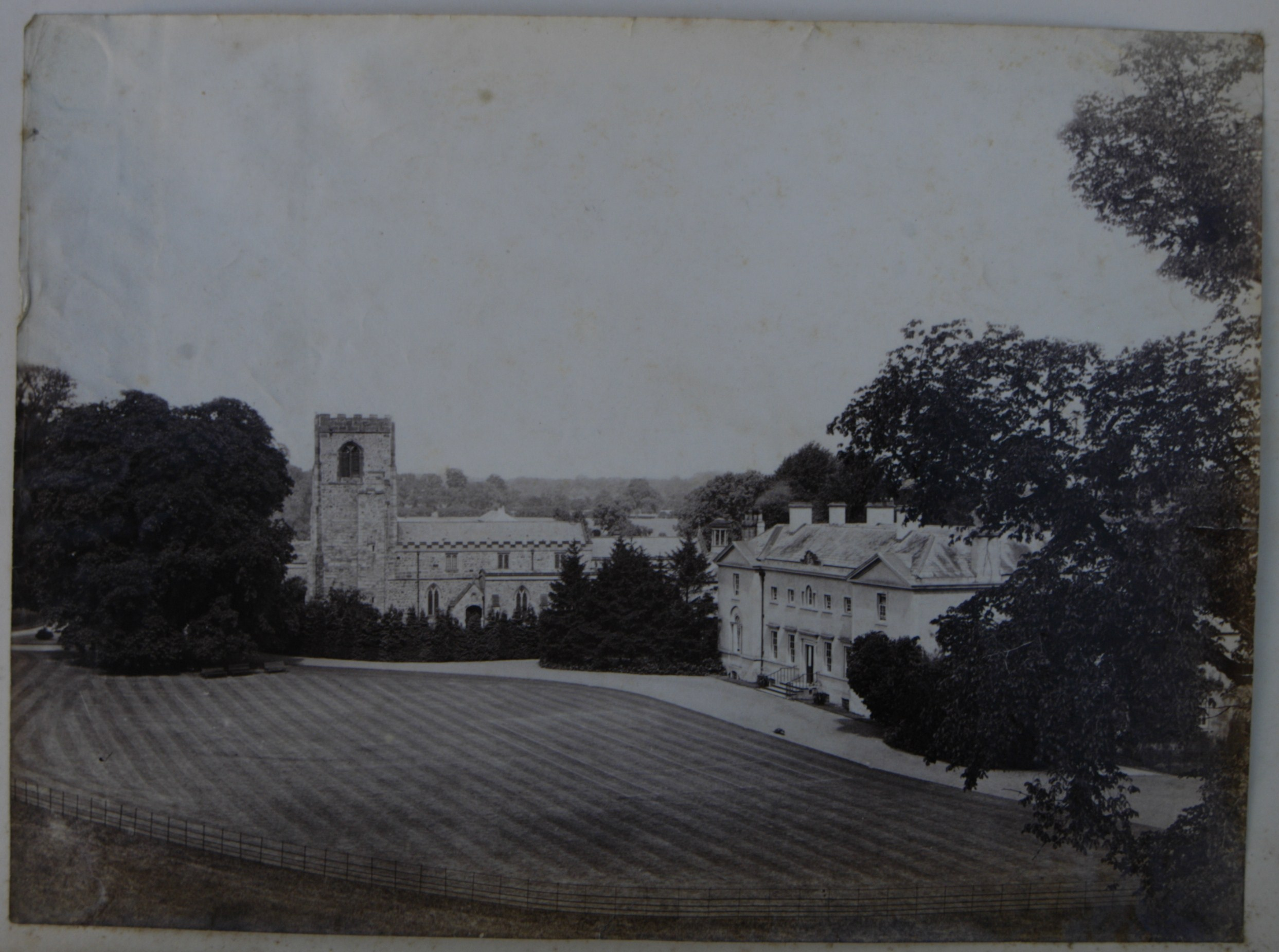
The lawn at Kirkby Fleetham Hall, Yorkshire, England, circa 1889

Before the mechanical lawn mower, the upkeep of lawns was possible only for the extremely wealthy estates and manor houses of the aristocracy. Labor-intensive methods of scything and shearing the grass were required to maintain the lawn in its correct state, and most of the land in England was required for more functional, agricultural purposes.

This all changed with the invention of the lawn mower by Edwin Beard Budding in 1830. Budding had the idea for a lawn mower after seeing a machine in a local cloth mill which used a cutting cylinder (or bladed reel) mounted on a bench to trim the irregular nap from the surface of woolen cloth and give a smooth finish. Budding realised that a similar device could be used to cut grass if the mechanism was mounted in a wheeled frame to make the blades rotate close to the lawn's surface. His mower design was to be used primarily to cut the lawn on sports grounds and extensive gardens, as a superior alternative to the scythe, and he was granted a British patent on 31 August 1830.

Budding went into partnership with a local engineer, John Ferrabee, who paid the costs of development and acquired rights to manufacture and sell lawn mowers and to license other manufacturers. Together they made mowers in a factory at Thrupp near Stroud. Among the other companies manufacturing under license the most successful was Ransomes, Sims & Jefferies of Ipswich which began mower production as early as 1832.

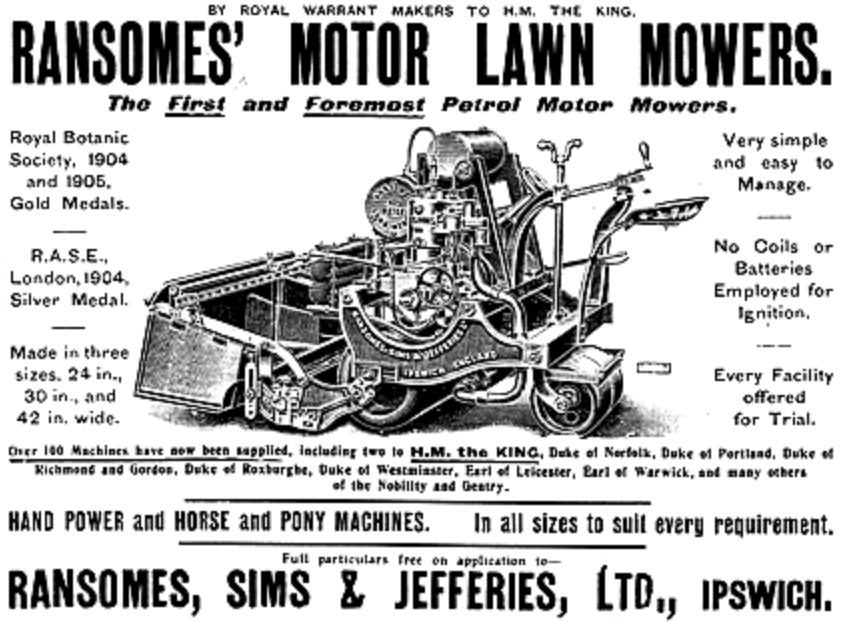
The first petrol-powered lawnmower, 1902

However, his model had two crucial drawbacks. It was immensely heavy (it was made of cast iron) and difficult to manoeuvre in the garden, and did not cut the grass very well. The blade would often spin above the grass uselessly. It took ten more years and further innovations, including the advent of the Bessemer process for the production of the much lighter alloy steel and advances in motorization such as the drive chain, for the lawn mower to become a practical proposition. Middle-class families across the country, in imitation of aristocratic landscape gardens, began to grow finely trimmed lawns in their back gardens.

In the 1850s, Thomas Green of Leeds introduced a revolutionary mower design called the Silens Messor (meaning silent cutter), which used a chain to transmit power from the rear roller to the cutting cylinder. The machine was much lighter and quieter than the gear driven machines that preceded them, and won first prize at the first lawn mower trial at the London Horticultural Gardens. Thus began a great expansion in the lawn mower production in the 1860s. James Sumner of Lancashire patented the first steam-powered lawn mower in 1893. Around 1900, Ransomes' Automaton, available in chain- or gear-driven models, dominated the British market. In 1902, Ransomes produced the first commercially available mower powered by an internal combustion gasoline engine. JP Engineering of Leicester, founded after World War I, invented the first riding mowers.

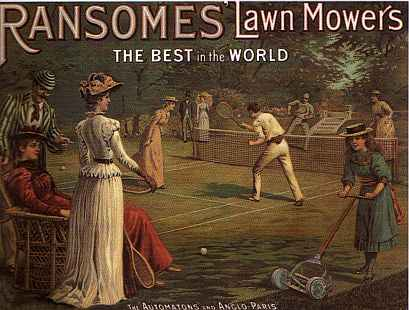
From the 19th century, the cultivation of lawns, especially for sports, became a middle-class obsession in England. Pictured, a lawnmower advertisement from Ransomes.

This went hand-in-hand with a booming consumer market for lawns from the 1860s onward. With the increasing popularity of sports in the mid-Victorian period, the lawn mower was used to craft modern-style sporting ovals, playing fields, pitches and grass courts for the nascent sports of football, lawn bowls, lawn tennis and others. The rise of Suburbanisation in the interwar period was heavily influenced by the garden city movement of Ebenezer Howard and the creation of the first garden suburbs at the turn of the 20th century. The garden suburb, developed through the efforts of social reformer Henrietta Barnett and her husband, exemplified the incorporation of the well manicured lawn into suburban life. Suburbs dramatically increased in size. Harrow Weald went from just 1,500 to over 10,000 while Pinner jumped from 3,00 to over 20,000. During the 1930s, over 4 million new suburban houses were built and the 'suburban revolution' had made England the most heavily suburbanized country in the world by a considerable margin.

Lawns began to proliferate in America from the 1870s onwards. As more plants were introduced from Europe, lawns became smaller as they were filled with flower beds, perennials, sculptures, and water features. Eventually the wealthy began to move away from the cities into new suburban communities. In 1856, an architectural book was published to accompany the development of the new suburbia that placed importance on the availability of a grassy space for children to play on and a space to grow fruits and vegetables that further imbued the lawn with cultural importance. Lawns began making more appearances in development plans, magazine articles, and catalogs. The lawn became less associated with being a status symbol, instead giving way to a landscape aesthetic. Improvements in the lawn mower and water supply enabled the spread of lawn culture from the Northeast to the South, where the grass grew more poorly. This in combination with setback rules, which required all homes to have a 30-foot gap between the structure and the sidewalk meant that the lawn had found a specific place in suburbia. In 1901, the United States Congress allotted $17,000 to the study of the best grasses for lawns, creating the spark for lawn care to become an industry.

=== The chemical boom ===
After World War II, a surplus of synthetic nitrogen in the United States led to chemical firms such as DuPont seeking to expand the market for fertilizers. The suburban lawn offered an opportunity to market fertilizers, previously only used by farmers, to homeowners. In 1955, DuPont released Uramite, a slow-release nitrogen fertilizer specifically marketed for lawns. The trend continued throughout the 1960s, with chemical firms such as DuPont and Monsanto utilizing television advertising and other forms of advertisement to market pesticides, fertilizers, and herbicides. The environmental impacts of this widespread chemical use were noticed as early as the 1960s, but suburban lawns as a source of pollution were largely ignored.

=== Organic lawns ===
Due to the harmful effects of excessive pesticide use, fertilizer use, climate change and pollution, a movement developed in the late 20th century to require organic lawn management. By the first decade of the 21st century, American homeowners were using ten times more pesticides per acre than farmers, poisoning an estimated 60 to 70 million birds yearly. Lawn mowers are a significant contributor to pollution released into Earth's atmosphere, with a riding lawn mower producing the same amount of pollution in one hour of use as 34 cars.

For example, in 2021 the New York City Council approved legislation prohibiting the use of most synthetic pesticides on city-owned property. Similar restrictions have been adopted by other municipalities, reflecting a broader movement toward organic land care practices informed by an increased focus on Lawn metabolism and soil–plant biological processes. There are many locations with organic lawns that require organic landscaping.

=== United States ===
Lawn seating
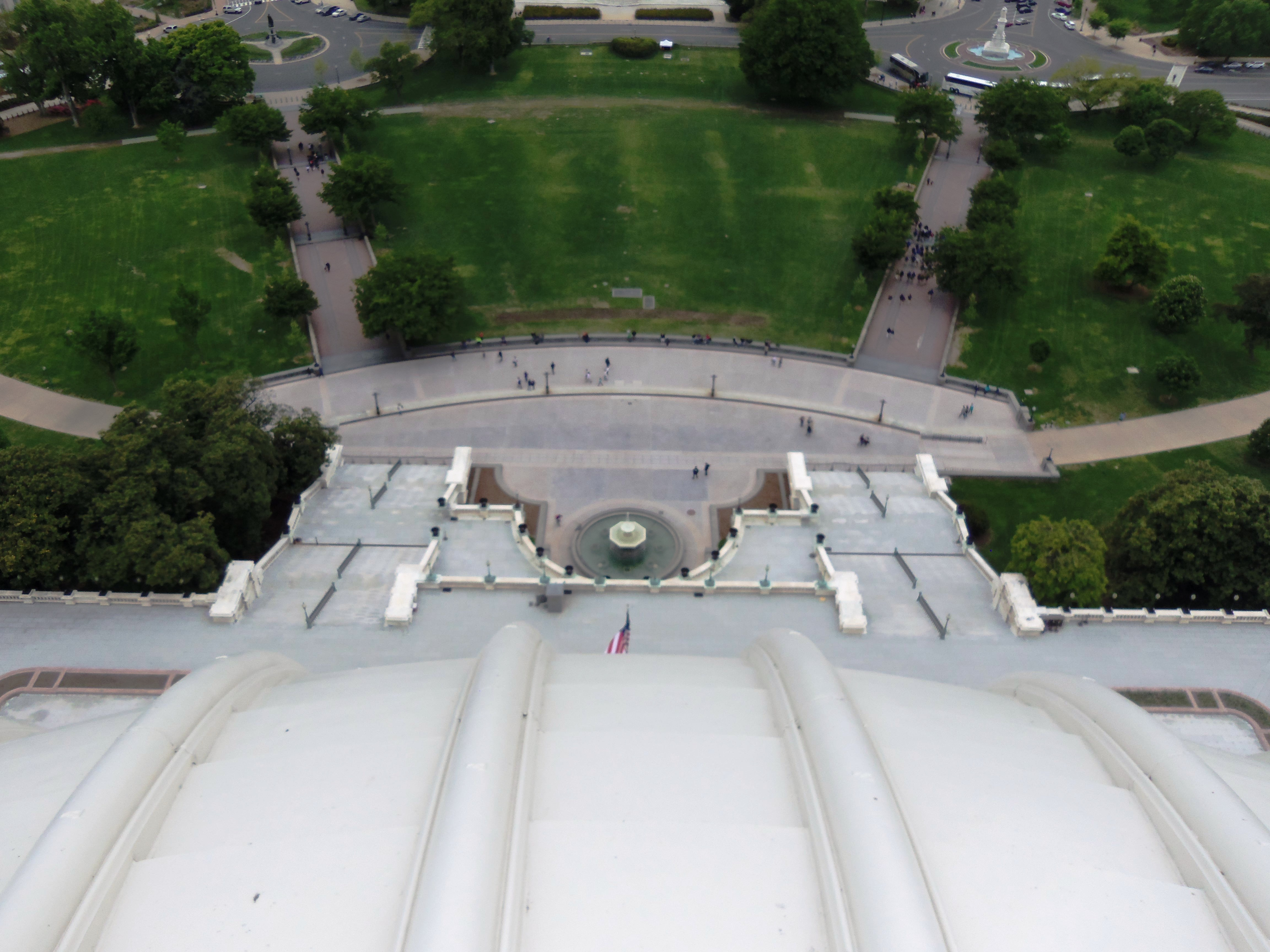
A Memorial Day concert on the west lawn of the U.S. Capitol Building

Prior to European colonization, the grasses on the East Coast of North America were mostly broom straw, wild rye, and marsh grass. As Europeans moved into the region, it was noted by colonists in New England, more than others, that the grasses of the New World were inferior to those of England and that their livestock seemed to receive less nutrition from it. In fact, once livestock brought overseas from Europe spread throughout the colonies, much of the native grasses of New England disappeared, and an inventory list from the 17th century noted supplies of clover and grass seed from England. New colonists were even urged by their country and companies to bring grass seed with them to North America. By the late 17th century, a new market in imported grass seed had begun in New England.

Much of the new grasses brought by Europeans spread quickly and effectively, often ahead of the colonists. One such species, Bermuda grass (Cynodon dactylon), became the most important pasture grass for the southern colonies.

Kentucky bluegrass (Poa pratensis) is a grass native to Europe or the Middle East. It was likely carried to Midwestern United States in the early 1600s by French missionaries and spread via the waterways to the region around Kentucky. However, it may also have spread across the Appalachian Mountains after an introduction on the east coast.

Farmers at first continued to harvest meadows and marshes composed of indigenous grasses until they became overgrazed. These areas quickly fell to erosion and were overrun with less favorable plant life. Soon, farmers began to purposefully plant new species of grass in these areas, hoping to improve the quality and quantity of hay to provide for their livestock as native species had a lower nutritive value. While Middle Eastern and Europeans species of grass did extremely well on the East Coast of North America, it was a number of grasses from the Mediterranean that dominated the Western seaboard. As cultivated grasses became valued for their nutritional benefits to livestock, farmers relied less and less on natural meadows in the more colonized areas of the country. Eventually even the grasses of the Great Plains were overrun with European species that were more durable to the grazing patterns of imported livestock.

A pivotal factor in the spread of the lawn in America was the passage of legislation in 1938 of the 40-hour work week. Until then, Americans had typically worked half days on Saturdays, leaving little time to focus on their lawns. With this legislation and the housing boom following the Second World War, managed grass spaces became more commonplace. The creation in the early 20th century of country clubs and golf courses completed the rise of lawn culture.

According to study based on satellite observations by Cristina Milesi, NASA Earth System Science, its estimates: "More surface area in the United States is devoted to lawns than to individual irrigated crops such as corn or wheat.... area, covering about 128,000 square kilometers in all."

Lawn monoculture was a reflection of more than an interest in offsetting depreciation, it propagated the homogeneity of the suburb itself. Although lawns had been a recognizable feature in English residences since the 19th century, a revolution in industrialization and monoculture of the lawn since the Second World War fundamentally changed the ecology of the lawn. Money and ideas flowed back from Europe after the U.S. entered WWI, changing the way Americans interacted with themselves and nature, and the industrialization of war hastened the industrialization of pest control. Intensive suburbanization both concentrated and expanded the spread of lawn maintenance which meant increased inputs in not only petrochemicals, fertilizers, and pesticides, but also natural resources like water.

Lawns became a means of performing class values for the urban middle class, in which the condition of the lawn becomes representative of moral character and social reliability. The social values associated with lawns are promoted and upheld by social pressure, laws, and chemical producers. Social pressure comes from neighbors or homeowner associations who think that the unkempt lawns of neighbors may affect their own property values or create eyesores. Pressures to maintain a lawn are also legal; there are often local or state laws against letting weeds get too tall or letting a lawn space be especially unkempt, punishable by fees or litigation. Chemical producers unwilling to lose business propagate the ideal of a lawn, making it seem unattainable without chemical aid.

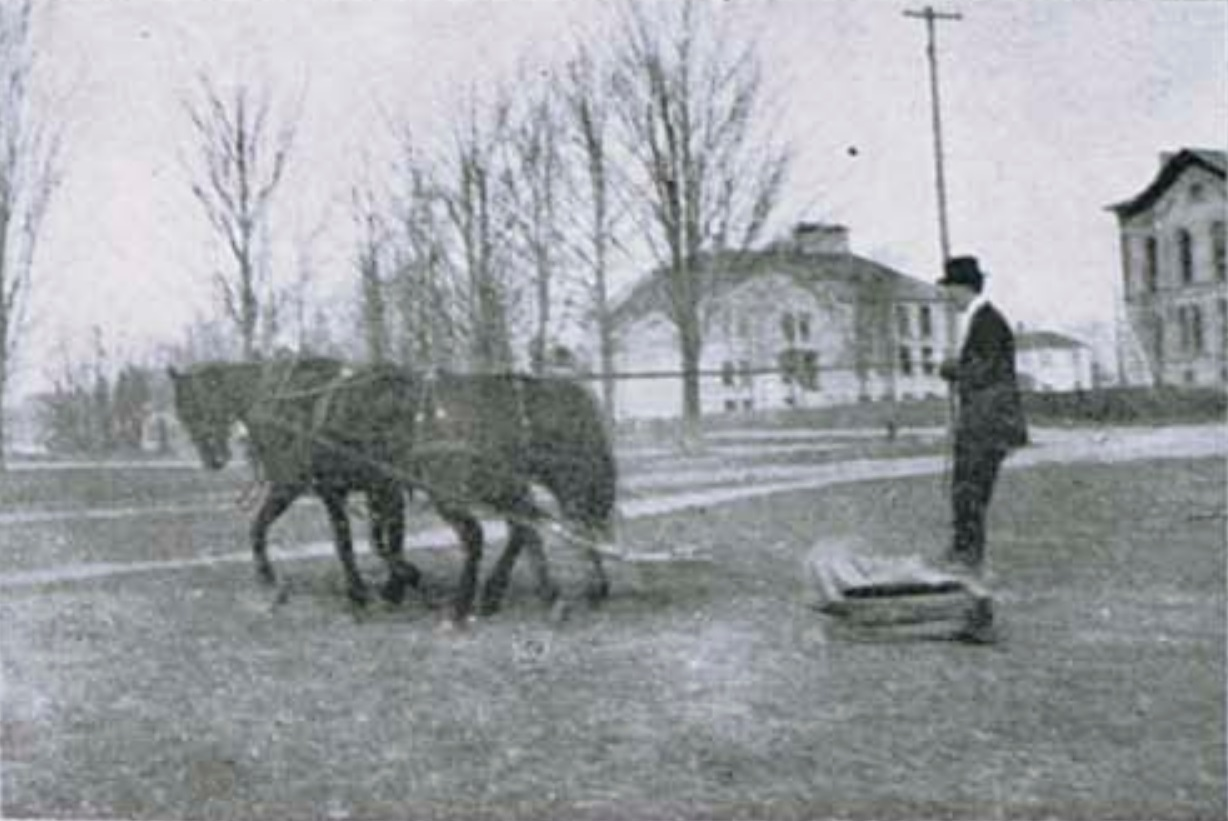
A high school principal caring for the school lawn; from a 1916–1917 yearbook in Sturgeon Bay, Wisconsin

Front lawns became standardized in the 1930s when, over time, specific aspects such as grass type and maintenance methods became popular. The lawn-care industry boomed, but the Great Depression of the 1930s and in the period prior to World War II made it difficult to maintain the cultural standards that had become heavily associated with the lawn due to grass seed shortages in Europe, America's main supplier. Still, seed distributors such as Scotts Miracle-Gro Company in the United States encouraged families to continue to maintain their lawns, promoting it as a stress-relieving hobby. During the war itself, homeowners were asked to maintain the appearances of the home front, likely as a show of strength, morale, and solidarity. After World War II, the lawn aesthetic once again became a standard feature of North America, bouncing back from its minor decline in the decades before with a vengeance, particularly as a result of the housing and population boom post-war.

The VA loan in the United States let American ex-servicemen buy homes without providing a down payment, while the Federal Housing Administration offered lender inducements that aided the reduction of down payments for the average American from 30% to as little as 10%. These developments made owning your own home cheaper than renting, further enabling the spread of suburbia and its lawns.

Levittown, New York, was the beginning of the industrial suburb in the 20th century, and by proxy the industrial lawn. Between 1947 and 1951, Abraham Levitt and his sons built more than seventeen thousand homes, each with its own lawn. Abraham Levitt wrote "No single feature of a suburban residential community contributes as much to the charm and beauty of the individual home and the locality as well-kept lawns". Landscaping was one of the most important factors in Levittown's success – and no feature was more prominent than the lawn. The Levitts understood that landscaping could add to the appeal of their developments and claimed that, "increase in values are most often found in neighborhoods where lawns show as green carpets" and that, over the years, "lawns trees and shrubs become more valuable both aesthetically and monetarily". During 1948, the first spring that Levittown had enjoyed, Levitt and Sons fertilized and reseeded all of the lawns free of charge.

The economic recession that began in 2008 has resulted in many communities worldwide to dig up their lawns and plant fruit and vegetable gardens. This has the potential to greatly change cultural values attached to the lawn, as they are increasingly viewed as environmentally and economically unviable in the modern context.

=== Australia ===
The appearance of the lawn in Australia followed closely after its establishment in North America and parts of Europe. Lawn was established on the so-called "nature strip" (a uniquely Australian term) by the 1920s and was common throughout the developing suburbs of Australia. By the 1950s, the Australian-designed Victa lawn mower was being used by the many people who had turned pastures into lawn and was also being exported to dozens of countries. Prior to the 1970s, all brush and native species were stripped from a development site and replaced with lawns that utilized imported plant species. Since the 1970s there has been an interest in using indigenous species for lawns, especially considering their lower water requirements. Lawns are also established in garden areas as well as used for the surface of sporting fields.

Over time, with consideration to the frequency of droughts in Australia, the movement towards "naturalism", or the use of indigenous plant species in yards, was beneficial. These grasses were more drought resistant than their European counterparts, and many who wished to keep their lawns switched to these alternatives or allowed their green carpets to revert to the indigenous scrub in an effort to reduce the strain on water supplies. However, lawns remain a popular surface and their practical and aesthetically pleasing appearance reduces the use of water-impervious surfaces such as concrete. The growing use of rainwater storage tanks has improved the ability to maintain them.

Following recent droughts, Australia has seen a change to predominately warm-season turfgrasses, particularly in the southern states like New South Wales and Victoria which are predominately temperate climates within urban regions. The more drought tolerant grasses have been chosen by councils and homeowners for the choice of using less water compared to cool-season turfgrasses like fescue and ryegrass. Mild dormancy seems to be of little concern when high-profile areas can be oversown for short periods or nowadays, turf colourants (fake green) are very popular.

== Uses ==
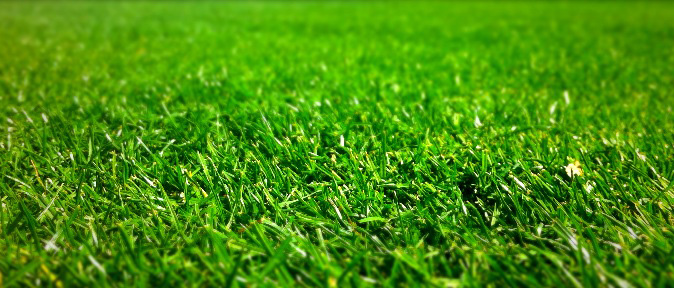
Newly seeded, fertilized and mowed

Lawns are a common feature of private gardens, public landscapes and parks in many parts of the world. They are created for aesthetic pleasure, as well as for sports or other outdoor recreational use. Lawns are useful as a playing surface both because they mitigate erosion and dust generated by intensive foot traffic and because they provide a cushion for players in sports such as rugby, football, soccer, cricket, baseball, golf, tennis, field hockey, and lawn bocce.

Lawns and the resulting lawn clipping waste can be used as an ingredient in making compost and is also viewed as fodder, used in the production of lawn clipping silage which is fed to livestock as a sustainable feed source.

== Types of lawn plants ==
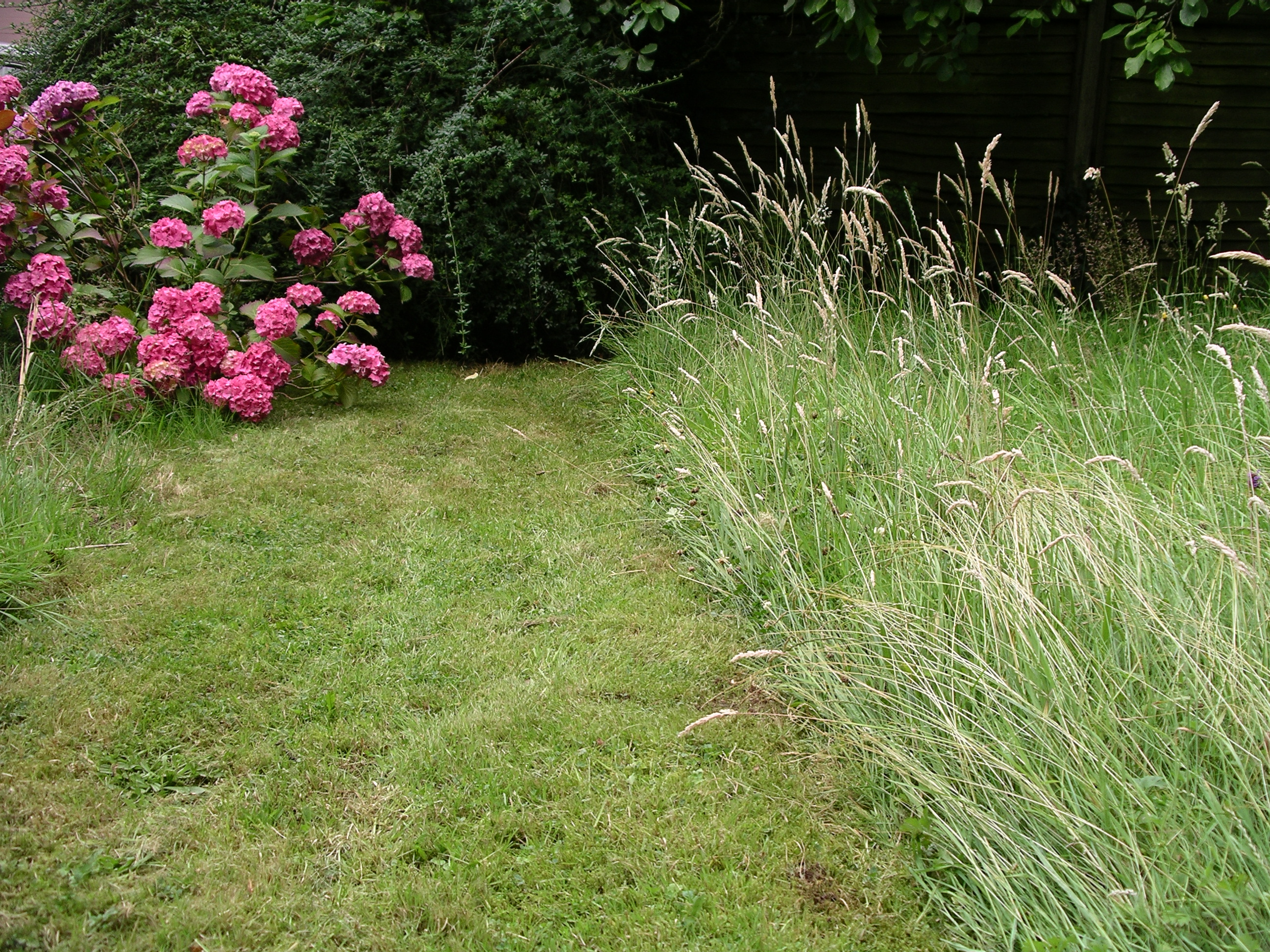
The area on the right has not been mown since the previous autumn.

Lawns need not be, and have not always been, made up of grasses alone. There exist, for instance, moss lawns, clover lawns, thyme lawns, and tapestry lawns (made from diverse forbs). Sedges, low herbs and wildflowers, and other ground covers that can be walked upon are also used.

Thousands of varieties of grasses and grasslike plants are used for lawns, each adapted to specific conditions of precipitation and irrigation, seasonal temperatures, and sun/shade tolerances. Plant hybridizers and botanists are constantly creating and finding improved varieties of the basic species and new ones, often more economical and environmentally sustainable by needing less water, fertilizer, pest and disease treatments, and maintenance. The three basic categories are cool season grasses, warm season grasses, and grass alternatives.

=== Grasses ===
Many different species of grass are currently used, depending on the intended use and the climate. Coarse grasses are used where active sports are played, and finer grasses are used for ornamental lawns for their visual effects. Some grasses are adapted to oceanic climates with cooler summers, and others to tropical and continental climates with hotter summers. Often, a mixture of grass or low plant types is used to form a stronger lawn when one type does better in the warmer seasons and the other in the colder ones. This mixing is taken further by a form of grass breeding which produces what are known as cultivars. A cultivar is a cross-breed of two different varieties of grass and aims to combine certain traits taken from each individual breed. This creates a new strain which can be very specialised, suited to a particular environment, such as low water, low light or low nutrient.

Diagram of a typical lawn grass plant

==== Cool season grasses ====
Cool season grasses start growth at 5 °C (41 °F), and grow at their fastest rate when temperatures are between 10 °C (50 °F) and 25 °C (77 °F), in climates that have relatively mild/cool summers, with two periods of rapid growth in the spring and autumn. They retain their color well in extreme cold and typically grow very dense, carpetlike lawns with relatively little thatch.

- Bluegrass (Poa spp.)
- Bentgrass (Agrostis spp.)
- Ryegrasses (Lolium spp.)
- Fescues (Festuca spp.)
- Feather reed grass (Calamagrostis spp.)
- Tufted hair grass (Deschampsia spp.)

==== Warm season grasses ====
Warm season grasses only start growth at temperatures above 10 °C (50 °F), and grow fastest when temperatures are between 25 °C (77 °F) and 35 °C (95 °F), with one long growth period over the spring and summer (Huxley 1992). They often go dormant in cooler months, turning shades of tan or brown. Many warm season grasses are quite drought tolerant, and can handle very high summer temperatures, although temperatures below −15 °C (5 °F) can kill most southern ecotype warm season grasses. The northern varieties, such as buffalograss and blue grama, are hardy to 45 °C (113 °F).

- Zoysiagrass (Zoysia spp.)
- Bermudagrass (Cynodon spp.)
- St. Augustine grass (Stenotaphrum secundatum)
- Bahiagrass (Paspalum spp.)
- Centipedegrass (Eremochloa ophiuroides)
- Carpet grass (Axonopus spp.)
- Buffalograss (Bouteloua dactyloides)
- Grama grass (Bouteloua spp.)
- Kikuyu grass (Pennisetum clandestinum)

=== Grass seed for shade ===
Grass seed mixes have been developed to include only grass seed species that grow well in low sunlight conditions. These seed mixes are designed to deal with light shade caused by trees that can create patchiness, or slightly heavier shade that prevents the full growth of grass. Most lawns will experience shade in some shape or form due to surrounding fences, furniture, trees or hedges and these grass seed species' are especially useful in the Northern Hemisphere and Northwestern Europe.

- Festuca rubra subsp. commutata (Chewings Fescue)
- Poa pratensis (Smooth Stalked Meadow Grass)
- Festuca ovina (Sheep Fescue)
- Festuca trachyphylla (hard fescue)
- Festuca rubra (Strong Creeping Red Fescue)

=== Sedges ===
Carex species and cultivars are well represented in the horticulture industry as 'sedge' alternatives for 'grass' in mowed lawns and garden meadows. Both low-growing and spreading ornamental cultivars and native species are used in for sustainable landscaping as low-maintenance and drought-tolerant grass replacements for lawns and garden meadows. Wildland habitat restoration projects and natural landscaping and gardens also use them for 'user-friendly' areas. The J. Paul Getty Museum has used Carex pansa (meadow sedge) and Carex praegracilis (dune sedge) expansively in the Sculpture Gardens in Los Angeles.

Some lower sedges used are:

- Carex caryophyllea (cultivar 'The Beatles')
- C. divulsa (Berkeley sedge)
- C. glauca (blue sedge) (syn. C. flacca)
- C. pansa (meadow sedge)
- C. praegracilis (dune sedge)
- C. subfusca (mountain sedge)
- C. tumulicola (foothill sedge) (cultivar 'Santa Cruz Mnts. selection')
- C. uncifolia (ruby sedge)

=== Other ground-cover plants ===
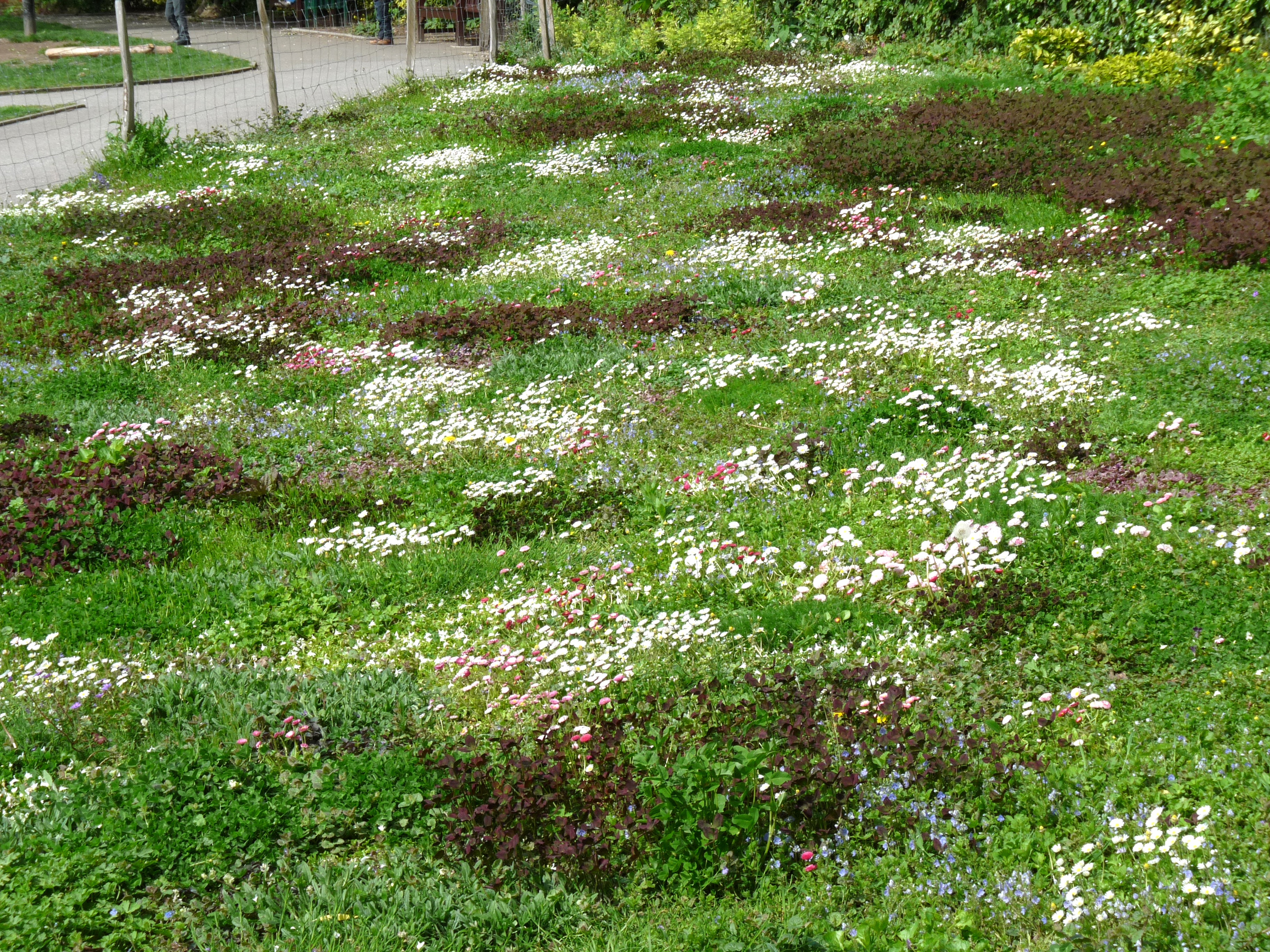
A floral tapestry lawn in Avondale Park, London. The area was previously grassed parkland. Tapestry lawns support more diverse plants and pollinators.

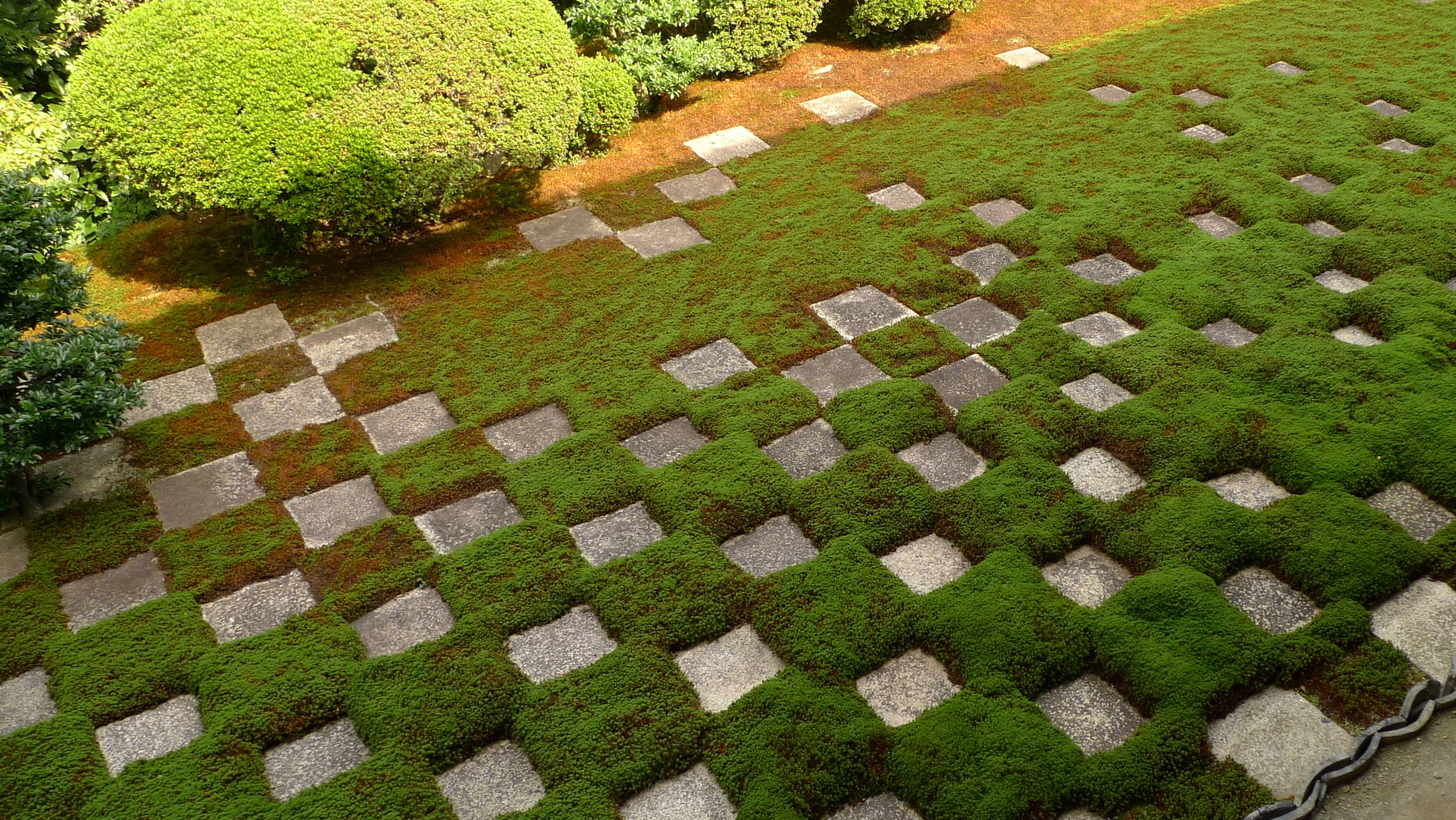
A moss lawn at Tōfuku-ji. The moss at the top of the image is golden-brown because it is dormant; it would become a brilliant green after a minute or two of misting, but that would destroy the ombré effect.

Moss lawns do well in shaded areas under trees, and require only about 1% of the water of a traditional grass lawn once established. Clover lawns do especially well in damp, alkaline soils. Yarrow lawns are drought resistant, can be mowed to form a soft, comfortable turf; common yarrow is native throughout Europe, North America, and parts of Asia, and spreads vegetatively to cover the ground. Camomile lawns and thyme lawns are fragrant (and native to Europe and North Africa). Soleirolia soleirolii favours shaded, damp spaces (and is often used in tsubo-niwas); it is native to the European side of the Mediterranean, and can be invasive elsewhere.

Other low ground covers suitable for lawns include Corsican mint (native to three mediterranean islands, invasive), Ophiopogon planiscapus (native to Japan), Lippia and lawnleaf, (native to Central America and southern North America), purple flowering Mazus (native to East Asia), grey Dymondia (native to South Africa), creeping sedums (various species native to various continents), Cotula species (ditto), and creeping jenny (native to Europe).

==== Eastern North America ====
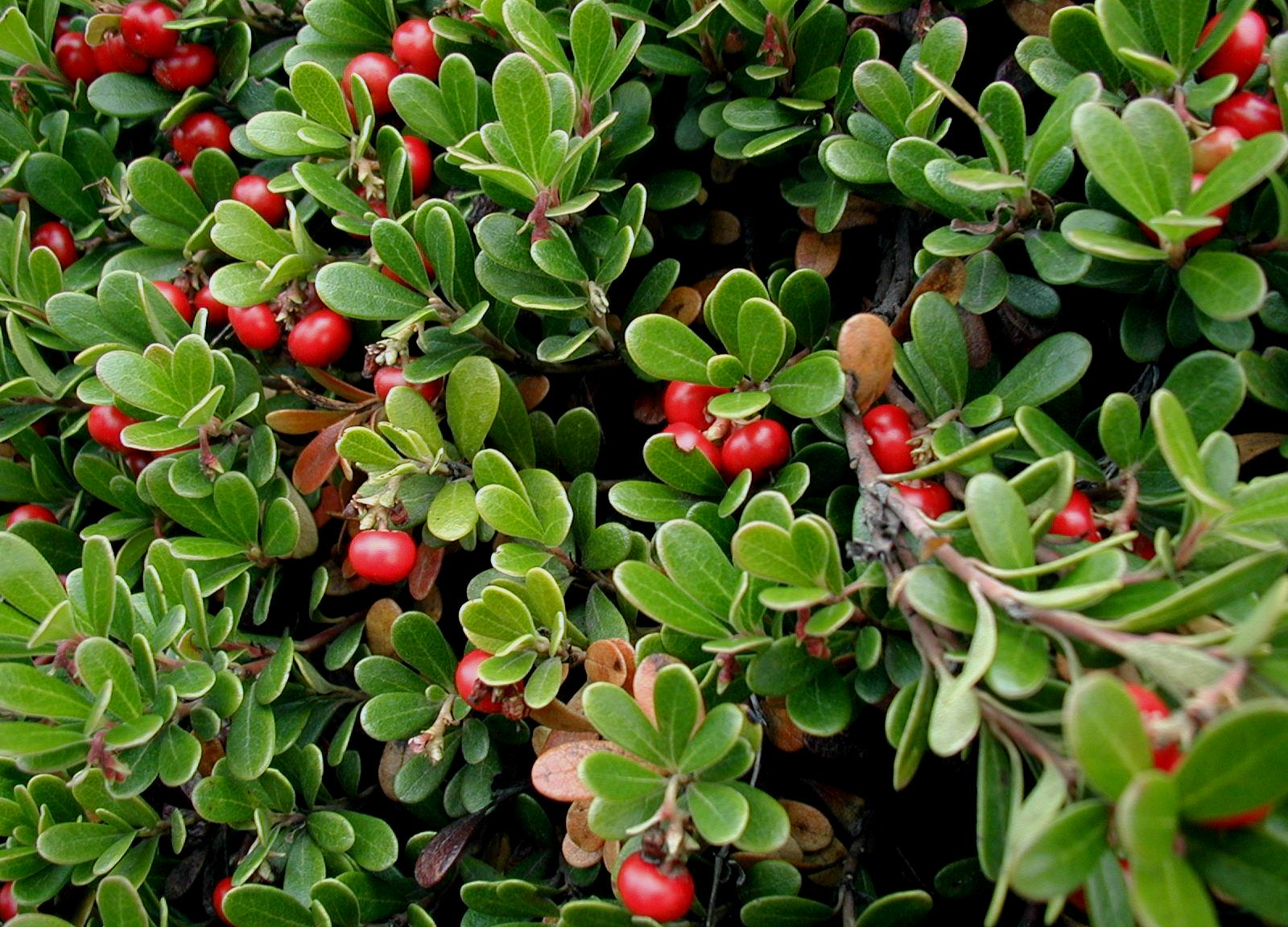
A ground cover plant, common bearberry

Some plants native to Eastern North America that can be used as alternatives to grass lawns or incorporated into lawns are:

- Common yarrow
- Virginia springbeauty
- Wild strawberry
- Dwarf cinquefoil
- Moss phlox
- Creeping phlox
- Sensitive fern
- Canadian wild ginger
- Cinnamon fern
- Lyreleaf sage
- Allegheny pachysandra
- Woodland stonecrop
- Green-and-gold
- Beetleweed
- Blue-eyed grass
- Common blue violet
- Dwarf crested iris
- Wild pink
- Purple wood sorrel
- Spotted cranesbill

== Alternatives to lawns ==
Alternatives to lawns include meadows, drought-tolerant xeriscape gardens, natural landscapes, native plant habitat gardens, paved Spanish courtyard and patio gardens, butterfly gardens, rain gardens, and kitchen gardens. Trees and shrubs in close proximity to lawns provide habitat for birds in traditional, cottage and wildlife gardens.

== Lawn care and maintenance ==
Seasonal lawn establishment and care varies depending on the climate zone and type of lawn grown.

=== Planting and seeding ===
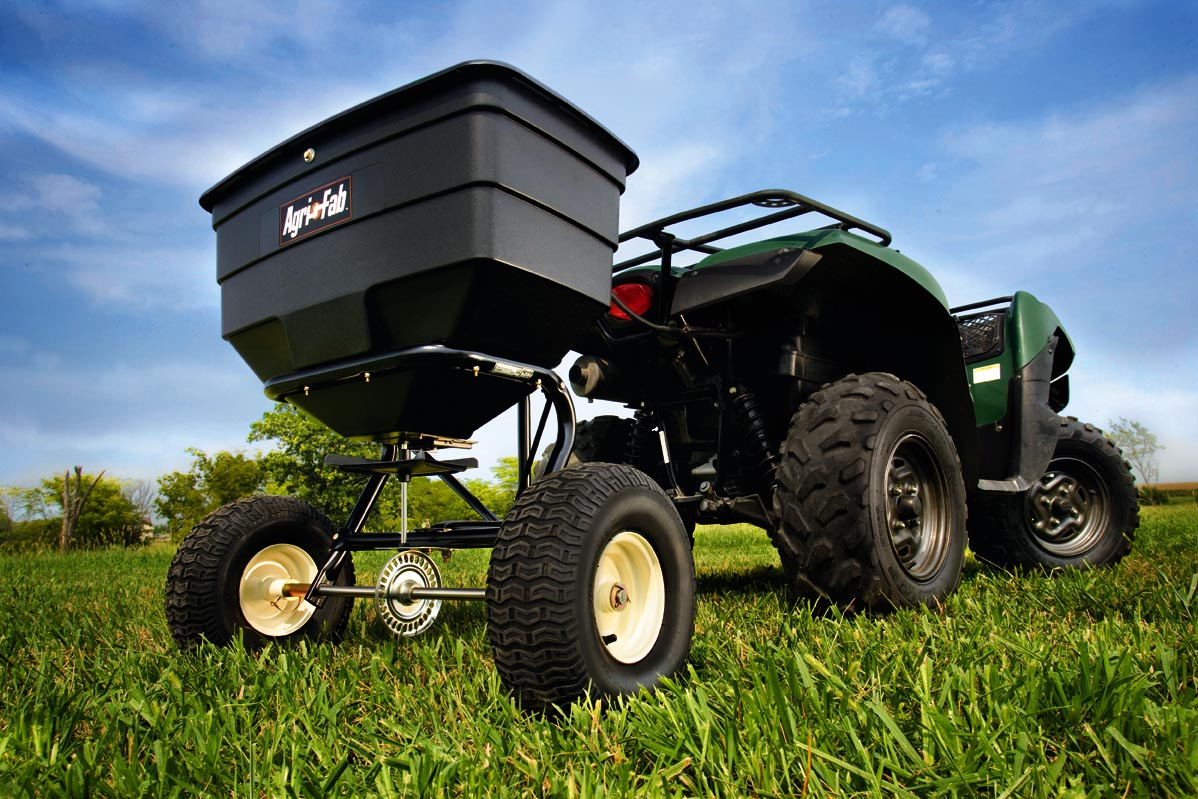
Broadcast spreaders can be attached to tractors or ATVs to spread seed or fertilizer

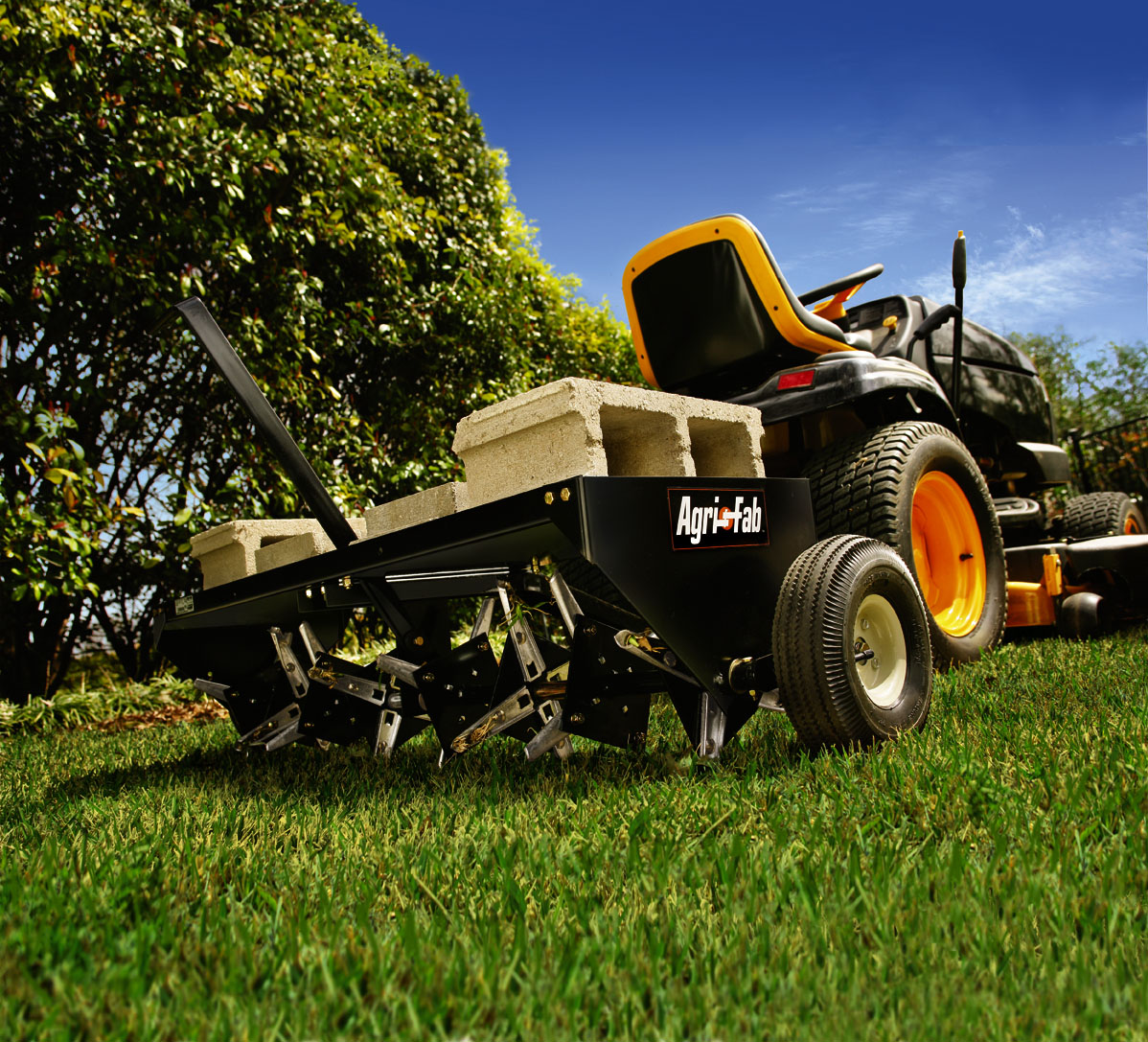
Aeration is one method used to maintain a lawn

Early autumn, spring, and early summer are the primary seasons to seed, lay sod (turf), plant 'liners', or 'sprig' new lawns, when the soil is warmer and air cooler. Seeding is the least expensive, but may take longer for the lawn to be established. Aerating just before planting/seeding may promote deeper root growth and thicker turf.

Sodding (American English), or turfing (British English), provides an almost instant lawn, and can be undertaken in most temperate climates in any season, but is more expensive and more vulnerable to drought until established. Hydroseeding is a quick, less expensive method of planting large, sloped or hillside landscapes. Some grasses and sedges are available and planted from 'liner' and 4-inch (100 mm) containers, from 'flats', 'plugs' or 'sprigs', and are planted apart to grow together.

Lawn growth, 20-hour time lapse

=== Fertilizers and chemicals ===
Various organic and inorganic or synthetic fertilizers are available, with instant or time-release applications. Pesticides, which includes biological and chemical herbicides, insecticides and fungicides, treating diseases like gray leaf spot, are available. Consideration for their effects on the lawn and garden ecosystem and via runoff and dispersion on the surrounding environment, inform laws constraining their use. For example, the Canadian province of Quebec and over 130 municipalities prohibit the use of synthetic lawn pesticides. The Ontario provincial government promised in September 2007 to also implement a province-wide ban on the cosmetic use of lawn pesticides, for protecting the public. Medical and environmental groups supported such a ban.

On 22 April 2008, the Provincial Government of Ontario announced that it would pass legislation that would prohibit, province-wide, the cosmetic use and sale of lawn and garden pesticides. The Ontario legislation would also echo Massachusetts law requiring pesticide manufacturers to reduce the toxins they use in production. Experts advise that a healthy lawn contains at least some "weeds" and insects, discouraging indiscriminate use of potentially harmful chemicals.

Sustainable gardening uses organic horticulture methods, such as organic fertilizers, biological pest control, beneficial insects, and companion planting, among other methods, to sustain an attractive lawn in a safe garden. An example of an organic herbicide is corn gluten meal, which releases an 'organic dipeptide' into the soil to inhibit root formation of germinating weed seeds. An example of an organic alternative to insecticide use is applying beneficial nematodes to combat soil-dwelling grubs, such as the larvae of chafer beetles. The Integrated Pest Management approach is a coordinated low impact approach.

=== Mowing and other maintenance practices ===
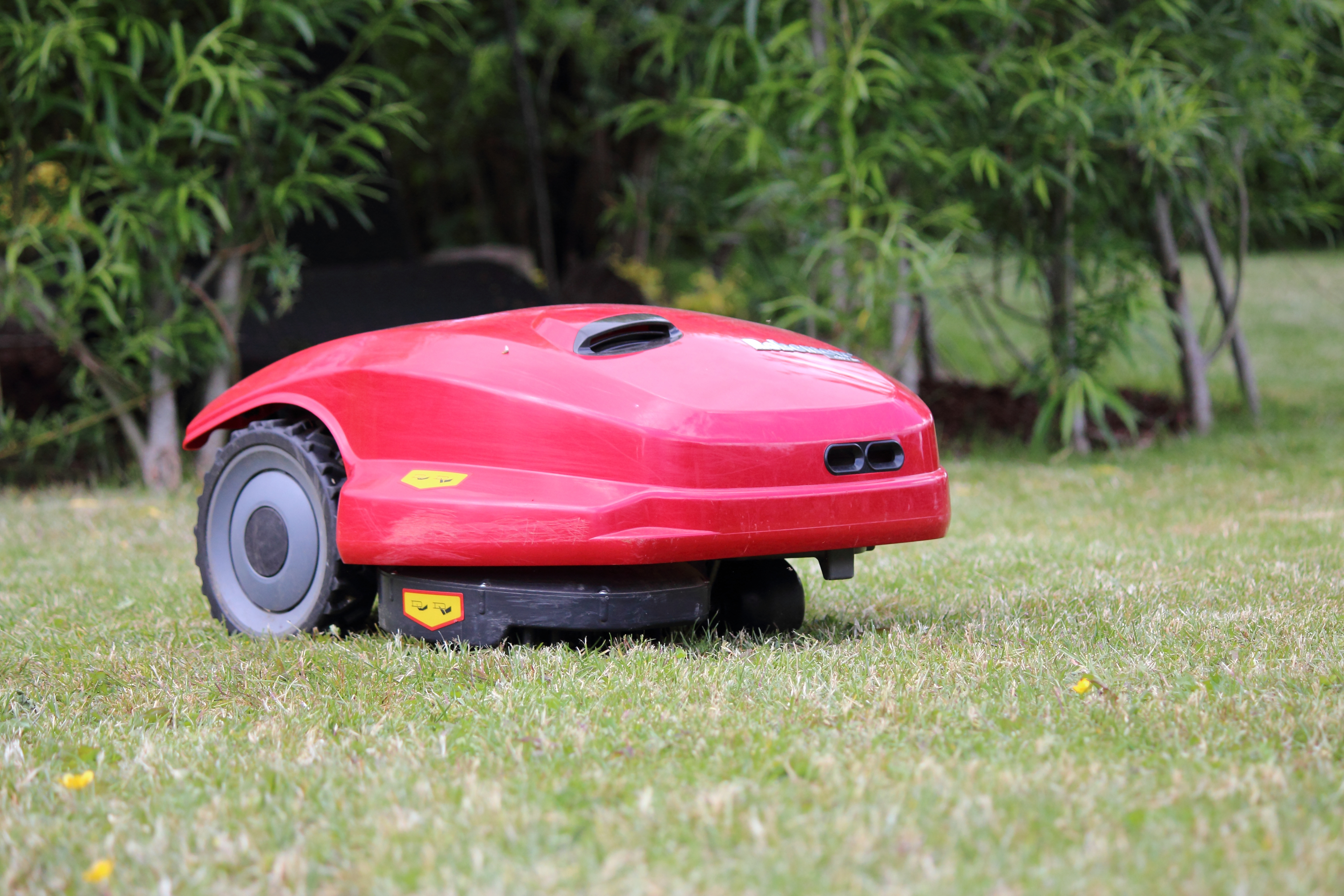
A typical lawn-mowing bot maintaining even and low grass

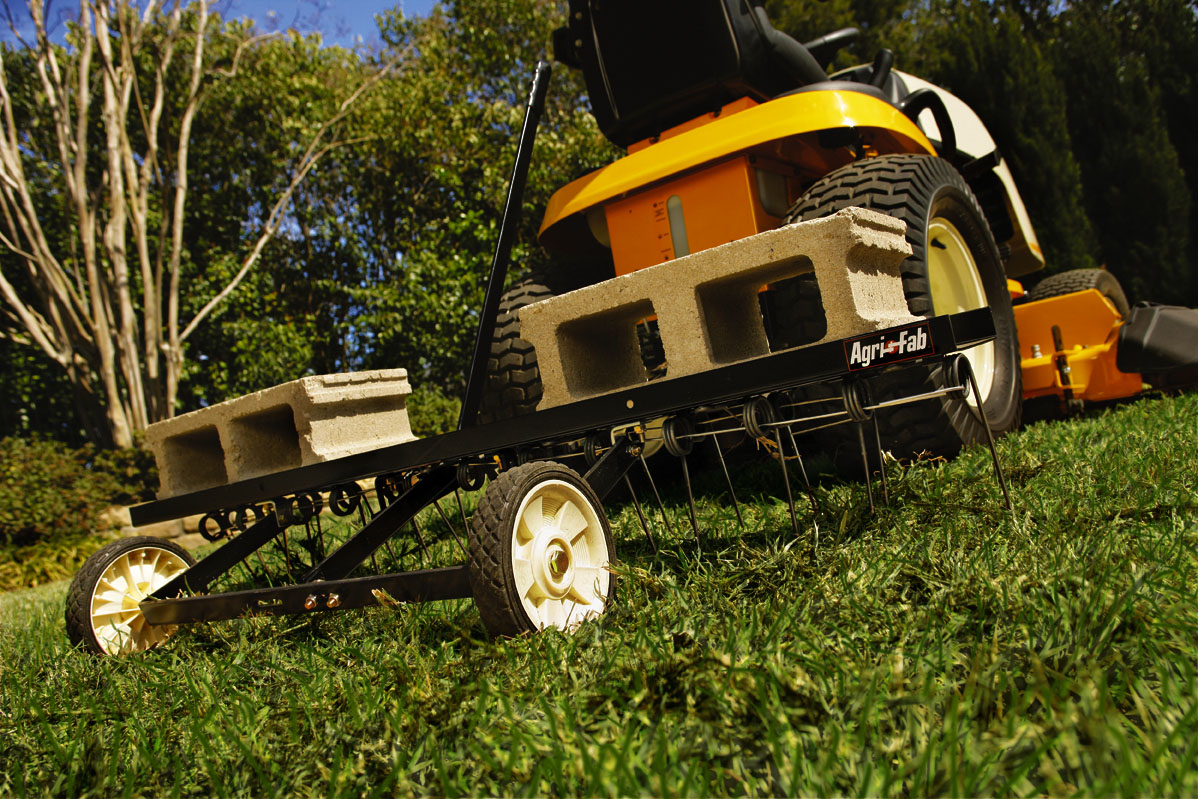
Dethatching removes dead grass and decomposing materials that build up in a lawn

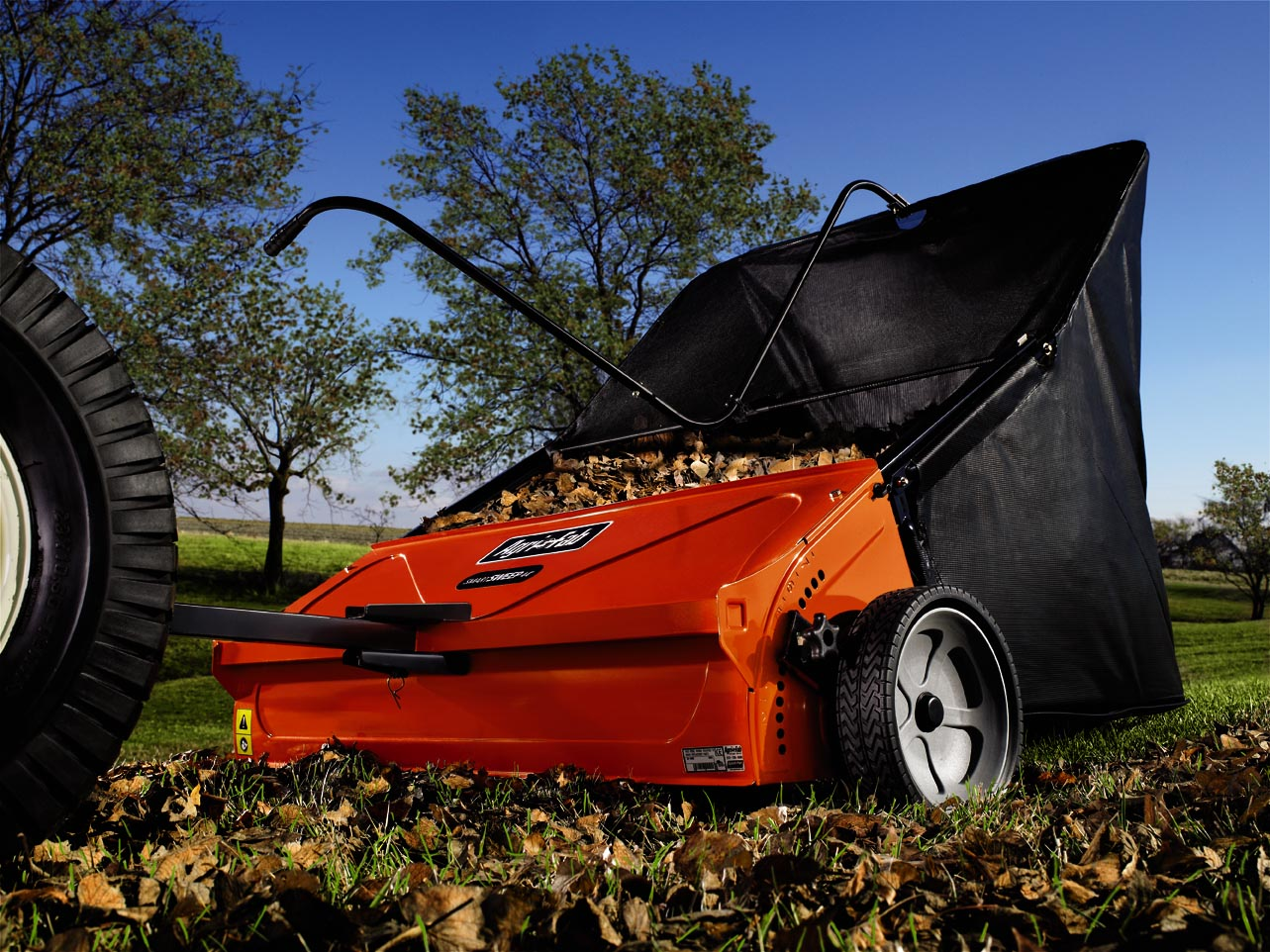
Lawn sweepers clean up debris from dethatching in addition to leaves, twigs, pine needles, etc.

Maintaining a rough lawn requires only occasional cutting with a suitable machine, or grazing by animals. Maintaining a smooth and closely cut lawn, be it for aesthetic or practical reasons or because social pressure from neighbors and local municipal ordinances requires it, necessitates more organized and regular treatments. Usually once a week is adequate for maintaining a lawn in most climates. However, in the hot and rainy seasons of regions contained in hardiness zones greater than 8, lawns may need to be maintained up to two times a week.

Low-maintenance alternatives to traditional turfgrass lawns reduce the need for frequent mowing, watering and chemical inputs.

=== Ecological dynamics ===
Lawns can be considered managed plant communities in which plant species compete for space, light, water, and nutrients. Repeated mowing acts as a form of disturbance that affects plant growth patterns and species composition rather than merely reducing vegetation height.

== Social impacts ==
The prevalence of the lawns in films such as Pleasantville (1998) and Edward Scissorhands (1990) alludes to the importance of the lawn as a social mechanism that gives great importance to visual representation of the American suburb as well as its practised culture. It is implied that a neighbor whose lawn is not in pristine condition is morally corrupt, emphasizing the role a well-kept lawn plays in neighborly and community relationships. In both of these films, green space surrounding a house in the suburbs becomes an indicator of moral integrity as well as of social and gender norms – lawn care has long been associated with men. These lawns also reinforce class and societal norms by subtly excluding those who may not have been able to afford a house with a lawn.

The lawn as a reflection of someone's character and the neighborhood at large is not restricted to films; the same theme appears in The Great Gatsby (1925), by American novelist F. Scott Fitzgerald. Character Nick Carraway rents the house next to Gatsby's and fails to maintain his lawn according to West Egg standards. The rift between the two lawns troubles Gatsby to the point that he dispatches his gardener to mow Carraway's grass and thereby establish uniformity.

Most lawn-care equipment over the decades has been advertised to men, and companies have long associated good lawn-care with good citizenship in their marketing campaigns. The appearance of a healthy lawn was meant to imply the health of the man taking care of it; controlled weeds and strict boundaries became a practical application of the desire to control nature, as well as an expression of control over personal lives once working full-time became central to suburban success. Women were encultured over time to view the lawn as part of the household, as an essential furnishing, and to encourage their husbands to maintain a lawn for the family and community reputation.

During World War II (1939–1945), women became the focus of lawn-care companies in the absence of their husbands and sons. These companies promoted lawn care as a necessary means by which women could help support their male family-members and American patriotism as a whole. The image of the lawn changed from focusing on technology and manhood to emphasizing aesthetic pleasure and the health benefits derived from its maintenance; advertisers at lawn care companies assumed that women would not respond positively to images of efficiency and power. The language of these marketing campaigns still intended to imbue the female population with notions of family, motherhood, and the duties of a wife; it has been argued that this was done so that it would be easier for men returning from war to resume the roles which their wives had taken over in their absence. This was especially apparent in the 1950s and 1960s, when lawn-care rhetoric emphasized the lawn as a husband's responsibility and as a pleasurable hobby when he retired.

There are differences in the particulars of lawn maintenance and appearance, such as the length of the grass, species (and therefore its color), and mowing.

Expectations of lawn maintenance have fueled violent conflict. In 2021, sheriffs acting on behalf of the city of Austin, Texas, United States, attempted to serve a warrant on a resident with an unkempt lawn, which escalated to a deadly shootout with SWAT agents. This followed a nonfatal shootout in Fort Worth, Texas, in the same year due to a resident having grass that exceeded 12 in (30 cm) in length.

== Environmental concerns ==
On average, greater amounts of chemical fertilizer, herbicide and pesticide are used to maintain a given area of lawn than on an equivalent area of cultivated farmland. The use of these products causes environmental pollution, disturbance in the lawn ecosystem, and health risks to humans and wildlife.

In response to environmental concerns, organic landscaping and organic lawn management systems have been developed and are mandated in some municipalities and properties. In the United Kingdom, the environmental group Plantlife has encouraged gardeners to refrain from mowing in the month of May to encourage plant diversity and provide nectar for insects.

Other concerns, criticisms, and ordinances regarding lawns arise from wider environmental consequences:

- Lawns can reduce biodiversity, especially when the lawn covers a large area. Traditional lawns often replace plant species that feed pollinators, requiring bees and butterflies to cross "wastelands" to reach food and host plants. Lawns promote homogenization and are normally cleared of unwanted plant and animal species, typically with synthetic pesticides, which can also kill unintended target species. They may be composed of introduced species not native to the area, particularly in the United States. This can produce a habitat that supports a reduced number of wildlife species.
- Lawn maintenance commonly involves use of fertilizers and synthetic pesticides, which can cause great harm. Some are carcinogens and endocrine disruptors. They may permanently linger in the environment and negatively affect the health of potentially all nearby organisms. The United States Environmental Protection Agency estimated in 2012 that nearly 32,000,000 kilograms (71,000,000 lb) of active pesticide ingredients are used on suburban lawns each year in the United States. There are indications of an emerging regulatory response to this issue. For example, Sweden, Denmark, Norway, Kuwait, and Belize have placed restrictions on the use of the herbicide 2,4-D.
- It has been estimated that nearly 64,000,000 litres (14,000,000 imp gal; 17,000,000 US gal) of gasoline are spilled each summer while re-fueling garden and lawn-care equipment in the United States: approximately 50% more than that spilled during the Exxon Valdez incident.
- The use of pesticides and fertilizers, requiring fossil fuels for manufacturing, distribution, and application, has been shown to contribute to global warming. (Sustainable organic techniques have been shown to help reduce global warming.) A hectare of lawn in Nashville, Tennessee, produces greenhouse gases equivalent to 697 to 2,443 kg of carbon dioxide a year. The higher figure is equivalent to a flight more than halfway around the world. Lawn mowing is one element of lawn culture that causes a great amount of emissions (which can be mitigated by replacing lawn mowers with grazing livestock).

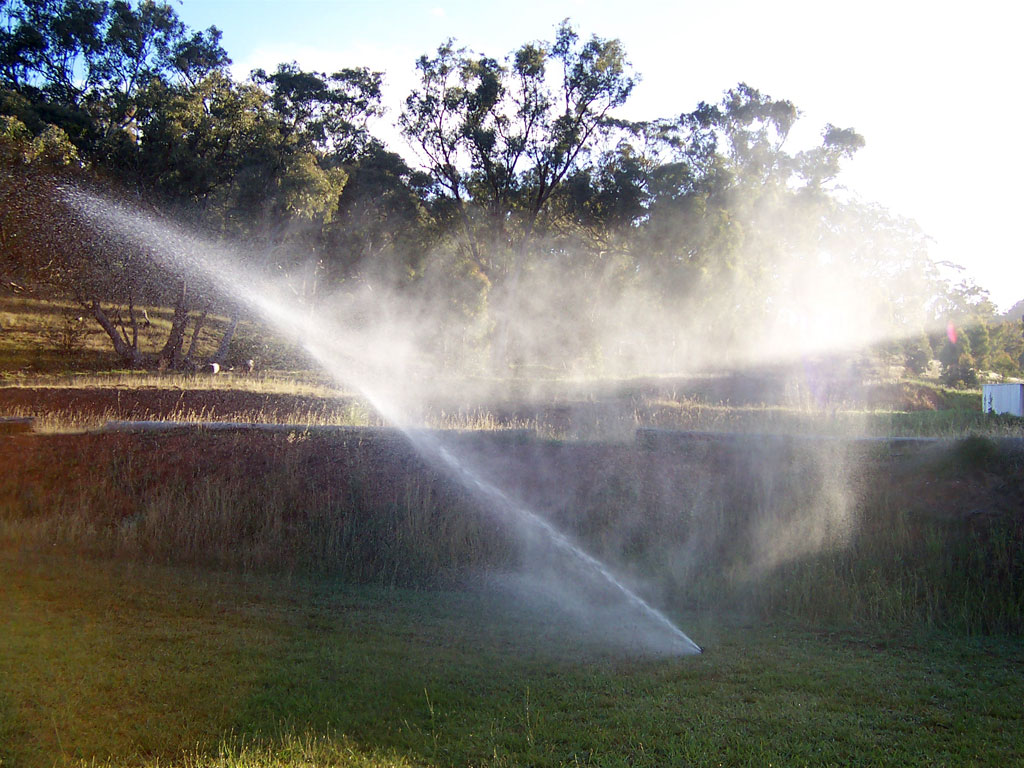
A lawn sprinkler

=== Water conservation ===
Maintaining a green lawn sometimes requires large amounts of water. While natural rainfall is usually sufficient to maintain a lawn's health in the temperate British Isles- the birthplace of the concept of the lawn- in times of drought hosepipe bans may be implemented by the water suppliers. Conversely, exportation of the lawn ideal to more arid regions (e.g. U.S. Southwest and Australia) strains water supply systems when water supplies are already scarce. This necessitates upgrades to larger, more environmentally invasive equipment to deal with increased demand due to lawn watering. Grass typically goes dormant during periods of cold or heat outside of its preferred temperature ranges; dormancy reduces the grasses' water demand. Most grasses typically recover quite well from a drought, but many property owners become concerned about the brown appearance and increase watering during the summer months. Water in Australia observed 1995 data that up to 90% of the water used in Canberra during summer drought periods was used for watering lawns.

In the United States, 50 to 70% of residential water is used for landscaping, with most used to water lawns. A 2005 NASA study estimated conservatively 128,000 square kilometres (49,000 sq mi; 32,000,000 acres) of irrigated lawn in the US, three times the area of irrigated corn. That translates to about 200 US gallons (760 L; 170 imp gal) of drinking-quality fresh water per person per day is required to keep up United States' lawn surface area.

In 2022, the state of Nevada pass a bill that not only banned the installation of new lawns in the state, but also mandated the removal of any lawn deemed "nonfunctional". This was in response to a years-long drought in the state.

=== Chemicals ===
An increased concern from the general public over pesticide and fertilizer use and their associated health risks, combined with the implementation of the legislation, such as the US Food Quality Protection Act, has resulted in the reduced presence of synthetic chemicals, namely pesticides, in urban landscapes such as lawns in the late 20th century. Many of these concerns over the safety and environmental impact of some of the synthetic fertilizers and pesticides has led to their ban by the United States Environmental Protection Agency and many local governments. The use of pesticides and other chemicals to care for lawns has also led to the death of nearly 7 million birds each year, a topic that was central to the novel Silent Spring by the conservationist Rachel Carson.

The use of lawn chemicals made its first appearance in the 18th century through the introduction of "English garden" fads. These types of lawns put precise hedging, clean cut grass, and extravagant plants on display. Following the initial introduction of lawn chemicals, they have still been continually used throughout North America. Because many of the turf-grass species in North America are not native to our ecosystems, they require extensive maintenance. According to the United States Geological Survey, 99% of the urban water samples that were tested contained one or more types of pesticides. In addition to water contamination, chemicals are making their way into houses which can lead to chronic exposure. Currently, standards for pesticide management practices have been put in place through the Food Quality Protection Act.

=== Environmental impact ===
In the United States, lawn heights are generally maintained by gasoline-powered lawn mowers, which contribute to urban smog during the summer months. The EPA found, in some urban areas, up to 5% of smog was due to small gasoline engines made before 1997, such as are typically used on lawn mowers. Since 1997, the EPA has mandated emissions controls on newer engines in an effort to reduce smog.

A 2010 study seemed to show lawn care inputs were balanced by the carbon sequestration benefits of lawns, and they may not be contributors to anthropogenic global warming. Lawns with high maintenance (mowing, irrigation, and leaf blowing) and high fertilization rates have a net emission of carbon dioxide and nitrous oxide that have large global warming potential. Lawns that are fertilized, irrigated, and mowed weekly have a lower species diversity.

Replacing turf grass with low-maintenance groundcovers or employing a variety of low-maintenance perennials, trees and shrubs can be a good alternative to traditional lawn spaces, especially in hard-to-grow or hard-to-mow areas, as it can reduce maintenance requirements, associated pollution and offers higher aesthetic and wildlife value. Growing a mixed variety of flowering plants instead of turfgrass is sometimes referred to as meadowscaping.

=== Non-productive space ===
Lawns take up space that could otherwise be used more productively, such as for urban agriculture or home gardening. This is the case in many cities and suburbs in the United States, where open or unused spaces are "not generally a result of a positive decision to leave room for some use, but rather is an expression of a pastoral aesthetic norm that prizes spacious lawns and the zoning restrictions and neighborhood covenants that give these norms the force of law."

In urban and suburban spaces, growing food in front yards and parking strips can not only provide fresh produce but also be a source of neighborhood pride. While converting lawn space into strictly utilitarian farms is not common, incorporating edible plants into front yards with sustainable and aesthetically pleasing design is of growing interest in the United States.

== See also ==
- Bacterial lawn
- Moss lawn
- Tapestry lawn
- Organic lawn management
- Gardening
- List of organic gardening and farming topics
