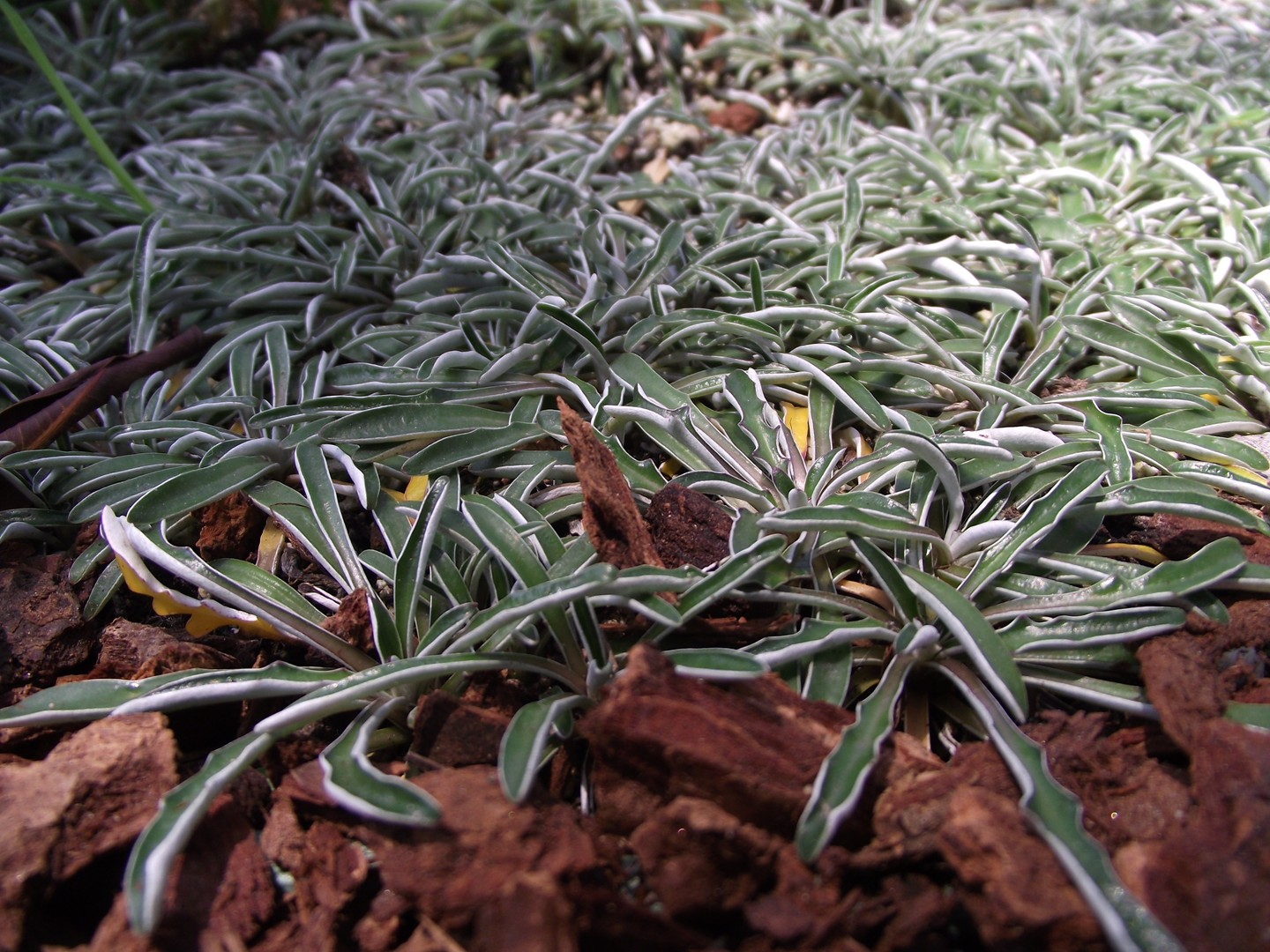

Scientific classification
- Kingdom: Plantae
- Clade: Tracheophytes
- Clade: Angiosperms
- Clade: Eudicots
- Clade: Asterids
- Order: Asterales
- Family: Asteraceae
- Subfamily: Vernonioideae
- Tribe: Arctotideae
- Subtribe: Arctotidinae
- Genus: Dymondia; Compton
- Species: D. margaretae

Binomial name
- Dymondia margaretae Compton

= Dymondia =

Silver carpet

Genus of flowering plants

Dymondia is a genus of flowering plants in the family Asteraceae. There is only one known species, Dymondia margaretae, endemic to the Cape Province region of South Africa.

Dymondia was first discovered and named after Margaret Elizabeth Dryden-Dymond, South African horticulturalist, botanical collector and teacher who worked at Kirstenbosch National Botanical Garden (1909-1952).

== Cultivation ==
- Light: full sun, part shade
- Habit: 2 inches (51 mm) high, spreads to make a carpet like ground cover. Non-invasive, slow-growing.
- Water: very drought tolerant. Regular watering is needed at higher temperatures and for six months after initial planting till plant is established. The deep roots act as water wells providing water to the plant as needed. The Dymondia carpet normally appears green/silver in color, but when roots are depleted and the plant needs water the leaves curl and their silver undersides are exposed to view. Water as needed in the silver colored areas to uncurl the leaves and return to green/silver color.
- Cold hardiness: 20 °F (−7 °C)
- Heat Tolerance: Does best under 100°F or 37°C with adequate watering.
- Origin: Cape Province and coastal plains of South Africa
- Soil: Very sandy – Soil mix of 40% vegetative matter, 30% red lava sand, and 30% river sand. Perlite can be added to the mix as needed and provides faster growing in flats and pots.

Makes a flat, very drought tolerant ground cover and good lawn replacement in dry zones. Takes medium foot traffic and often called living cement. Safe and non-toxic for dogs and pets. Works well as a filler between flagstone, pavers, or stepping stones and other confined areas. Soil retention: Excellent for erosion control on slopes and hills due to the large diameter and deep root system.
