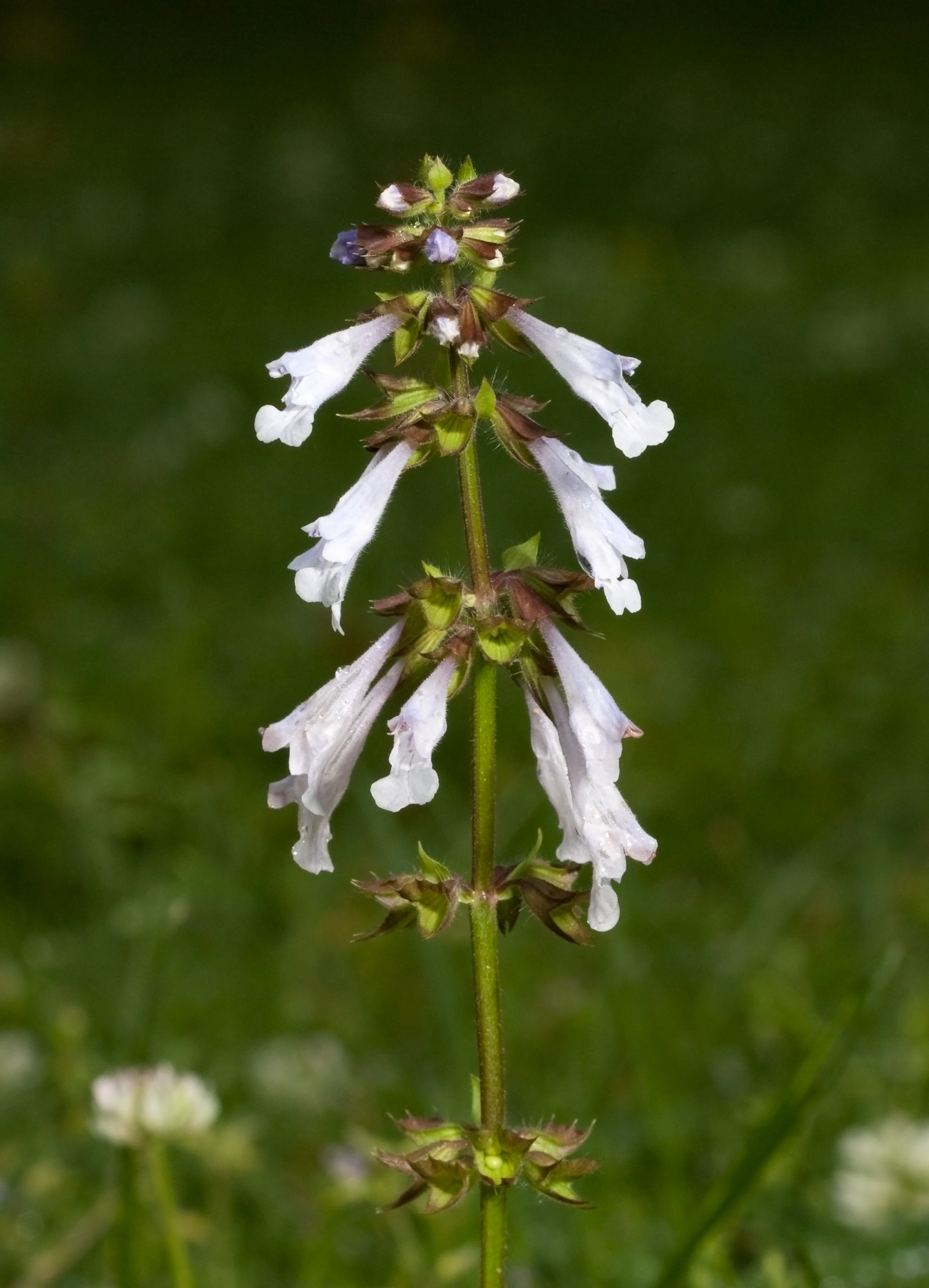

Scientific classification
- Kingdom: Plantae
- Clade: Tracheophytes
- Clade: Angiosperms
- Clade: Eudicots
- Clade: Asterids
- Order: Lamiales
- Family: Lamiaceae
- Genus: Salvia
- Species: S. lyrata

Binomial name
- Salvia lyrata L.

= Salvia lyrata =

Species of plant in the mint family

Salvia lyrata (lyre-leaf sage, lyreleaf sage, wild sage, cancerweed), is a herbaceous perennial in the family Lamiaceae that is native to the United States, from Connecticut west to Missouri, and in the south from Florida west to Texas. It was described and named by Carl Linnaeus in 1753.

== Description ==
Salvia lyrata forms a basal rosette of leaves that are up to 8 inches (20 cm) long, broadening toward the tip. The leaves have irregular margins and are typically pinnately lobed or cut, looking somewhat like a lyre. The center vein is sometimes dark wine-purple. A square-shaped hairy stem up to 2 feet (0.61 m) long grows from the rosette, with uneven whorls of two-lipped lavender to blue flowers. Flowering is heaviest between April and June, though sparse flowering can happen throughout the year. The leaves were once thought to be an external cure for cancer, thus one of the common names "Cancerweed". Salvia lyrata grows in full sun or light to medium shade, with native stands found on roadsides, fields, and open woodlands.

== Cultivation and uses ==
Salvia lyrata is sometimes grown in gardens for its attractive foliage and flowers, though it can prolifically seed, easily spreading into lawns. Its ability to thrive despite being mowed and walked on, however, mean it can be used as a turf grass alternative that is attractive to bees. Several cultivars have been developed with purple leaves. 'Burgundy Bliss' and 'Purple Knockout' are two cultivars with burgundy leaves that are deeper in color than the species. Native Americans used the root as a salve for sores, and used the whole plant as a tea for colds and coughs.

== Gallery ==
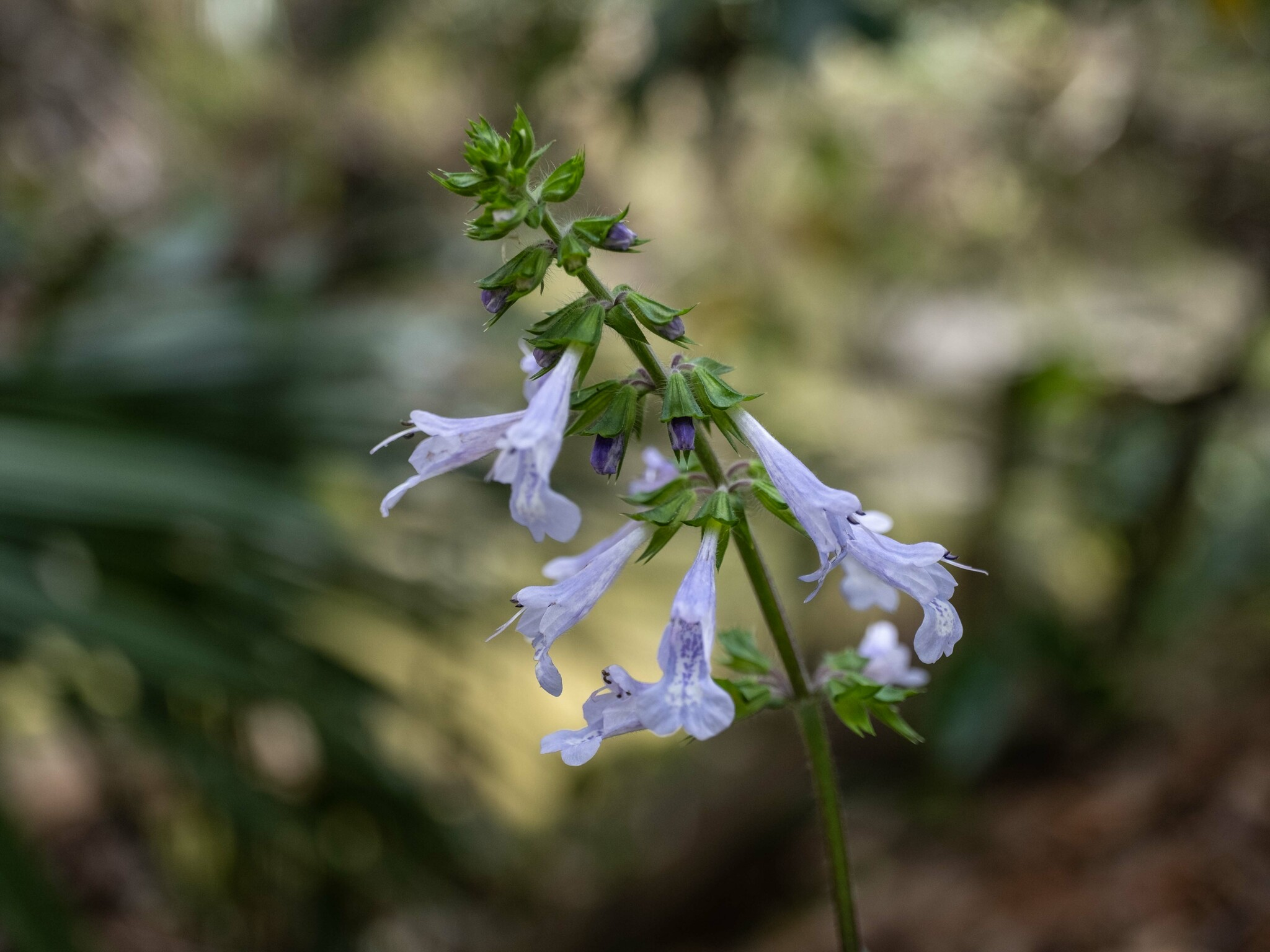
Inflorescence

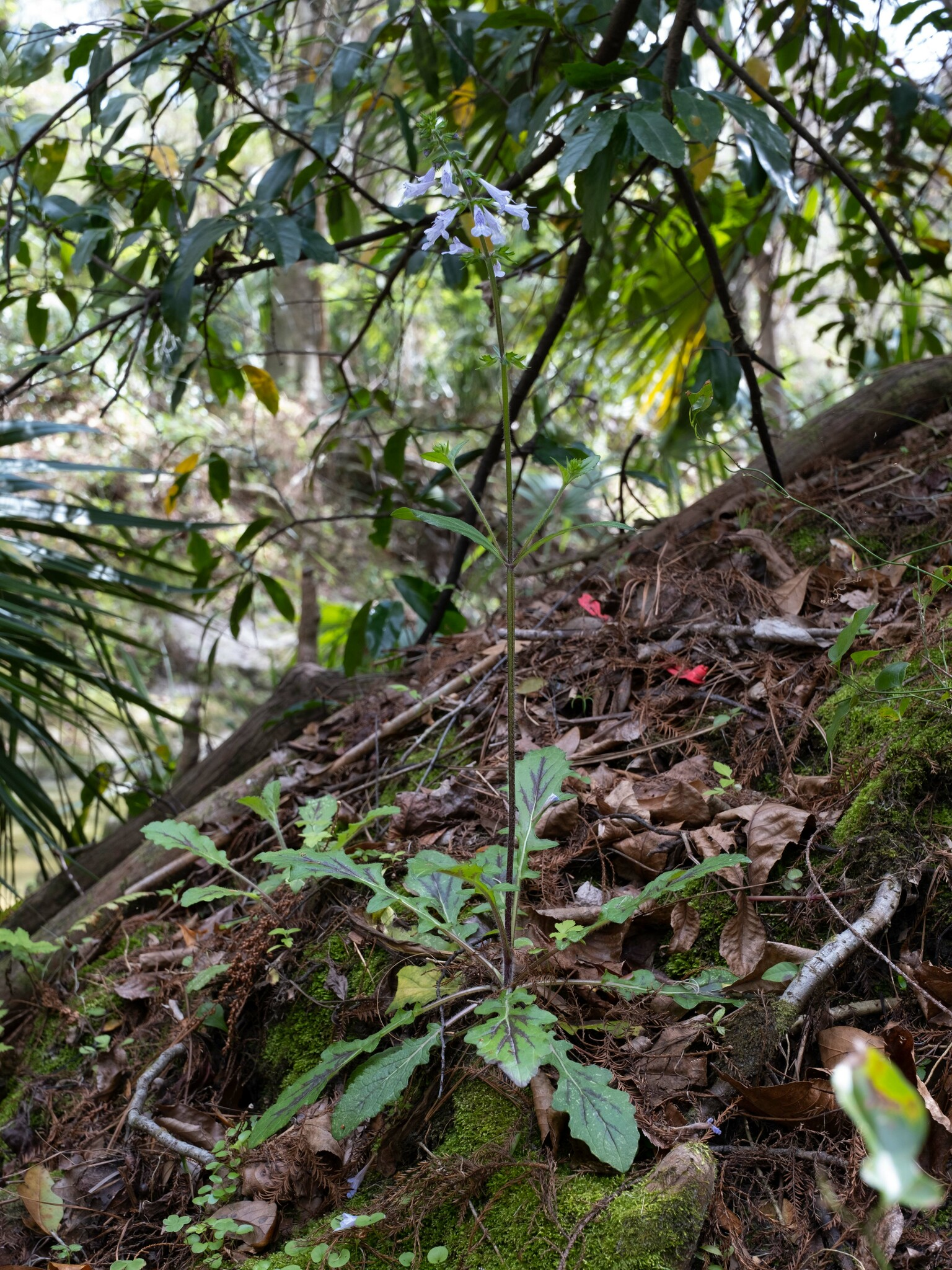
Whole plant

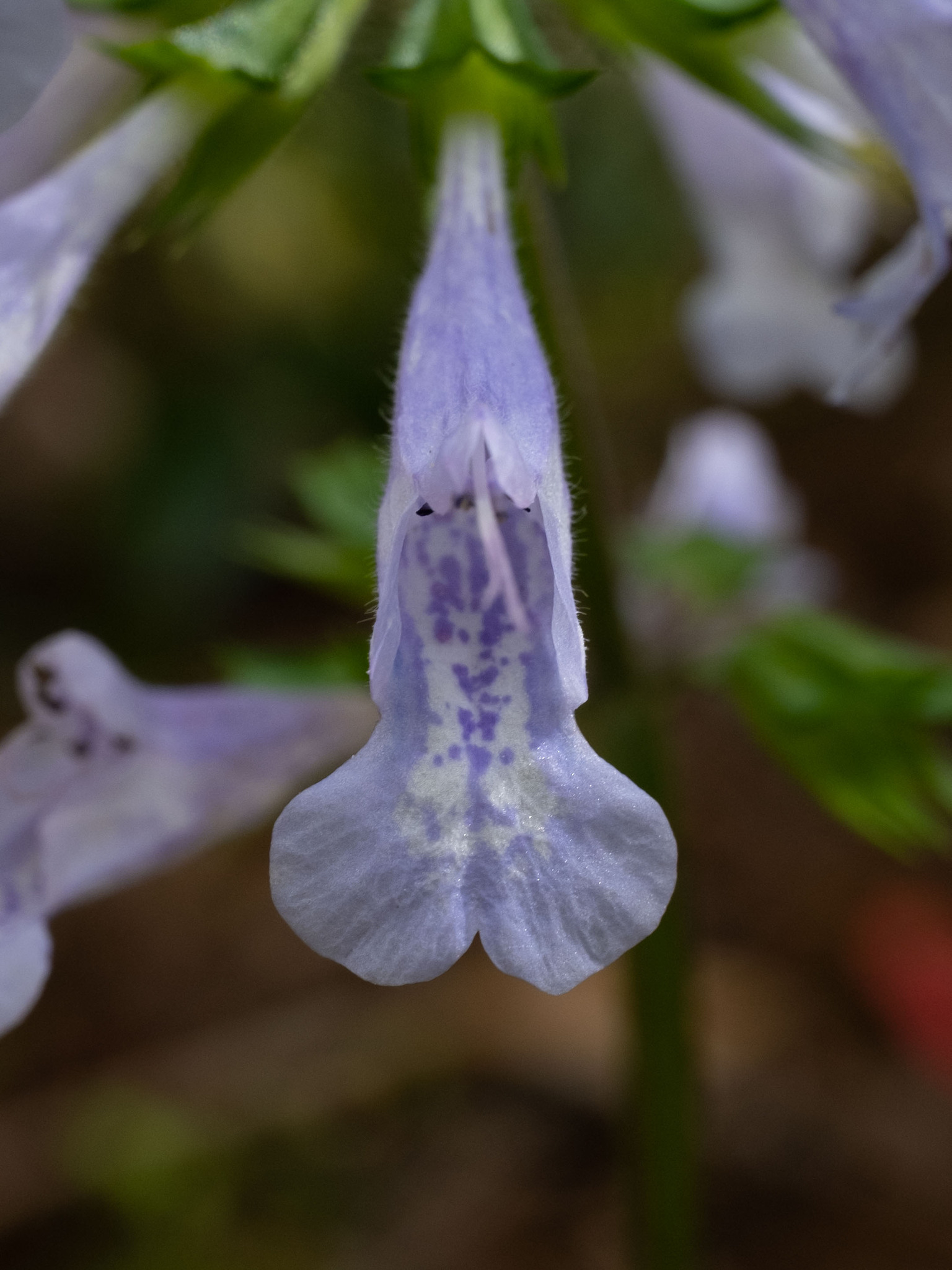
Corolla

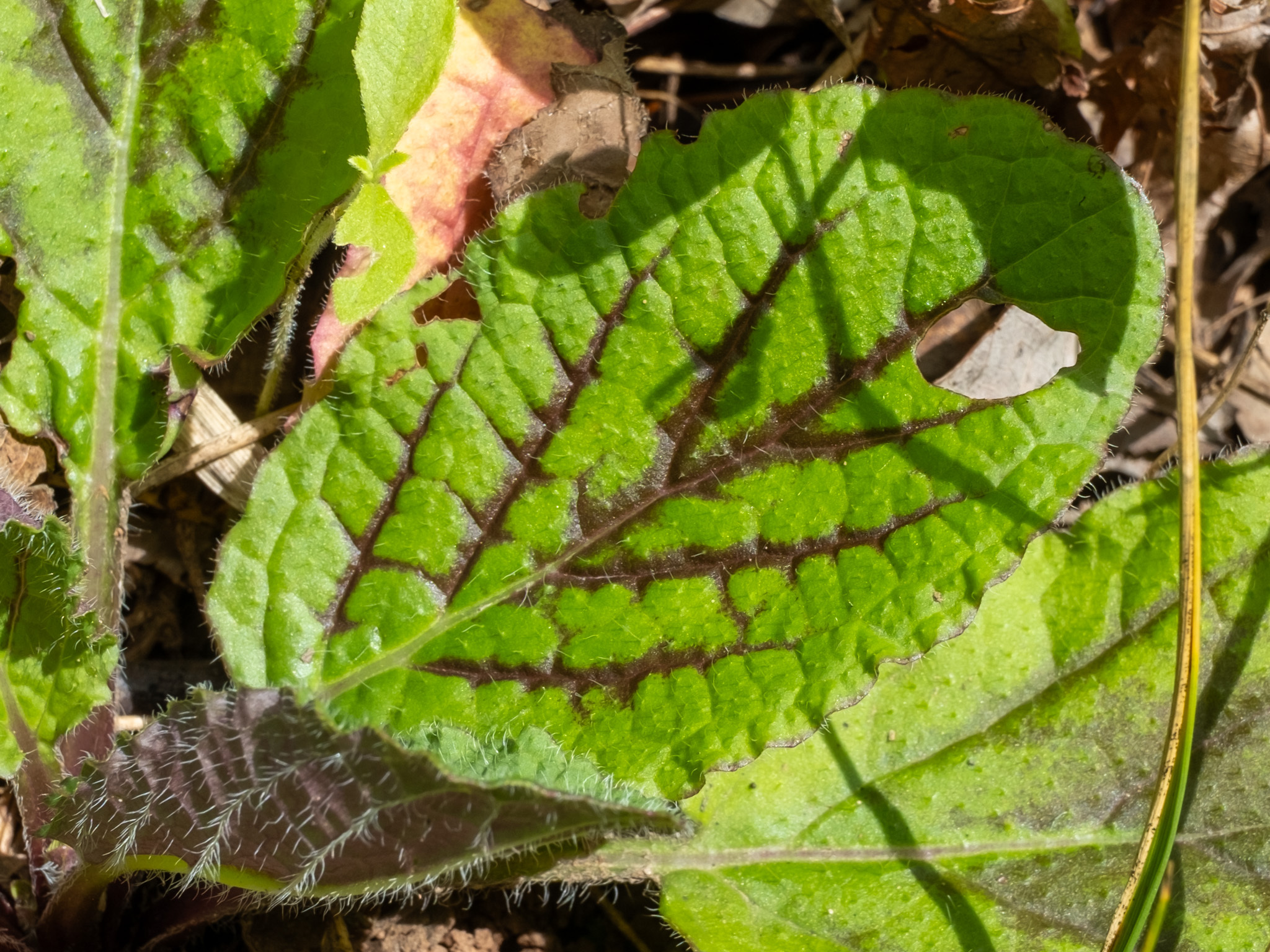
Leaf variegation

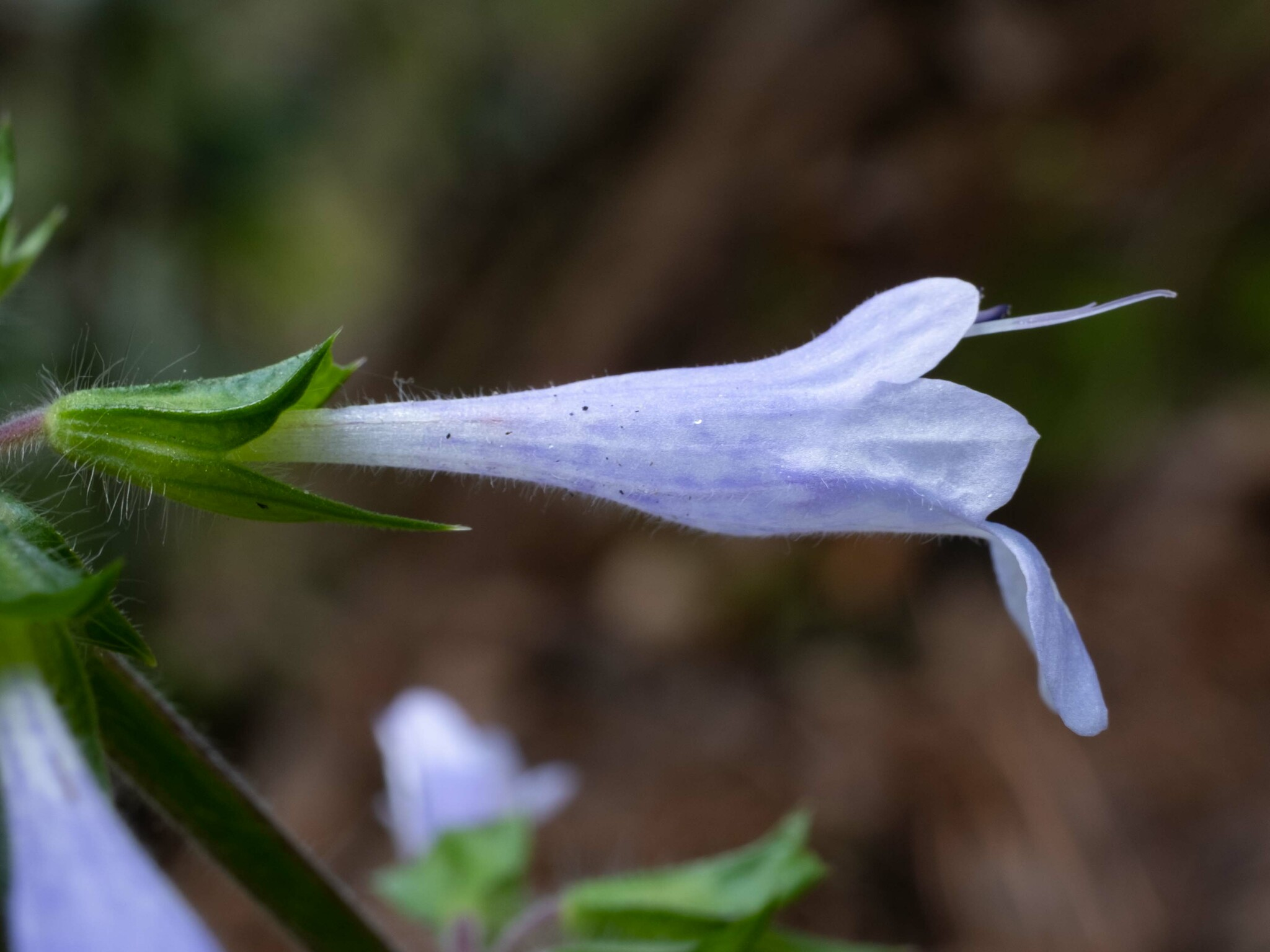
Calyx and corolla
