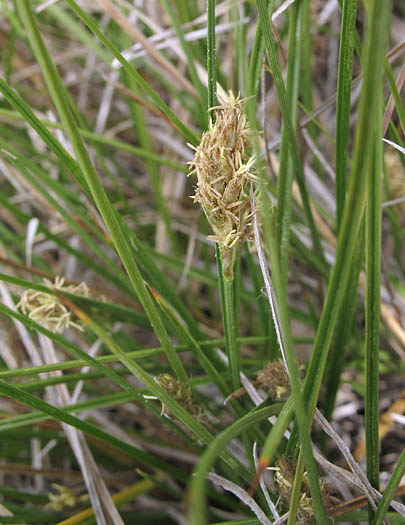
- At Point Mugu State Park in California

Scientific classification
- Kingdom: Plantae
- Clade: Tracheophytes
- Clade: Angiosperms
- Clade: Monocots
- Clade: Commelinids
- Order: Poales
- Family: Cyperaceae
- Genus: Carex
- Section: Carex sect. Divisae
- Species: C. praegracilis

Binomial name
- Carex praegracilis W.Boott

Synonyms
- Carex camporum

= Carex praegracilis =

Species of grass-like plant

Carex praegracilis is a species of North American sedge known as clustered field sedge, field sedge, and expressway sedge. Carex praegracilis is cultivated in the specialty horticulture trade as lawn substitute and meadow-like plantings.

== Distribution ==
This sedge is native to much of North America, from Alaska across southern Canada and throughout the continental United States, from California to Maine, except for the southeastern region.

== Description ==
Carex praegracilis grows in wet and seasonally wet environments in a number of habitats, including meadows and wetlands. It tolerates disturbed habitat such as roadsides and thrives in alkaline substrates. Carex praegracilis produces sharply triangular stems up 1 m (3 ft 3 in) tall from a network of thin, coarse rhizomes.

The inflorescence is a dense, somewhat cylindrical array of flower spikes up to 4 or 5 cm (1.6 or 2.0 in) long. The plant is often dioecious, with an individual bearing male or female flowers in its inflorescences, but not both. The range of this sedge is spreading, especially along roadsides where the application of road salt has apparently encouraged its growth.
