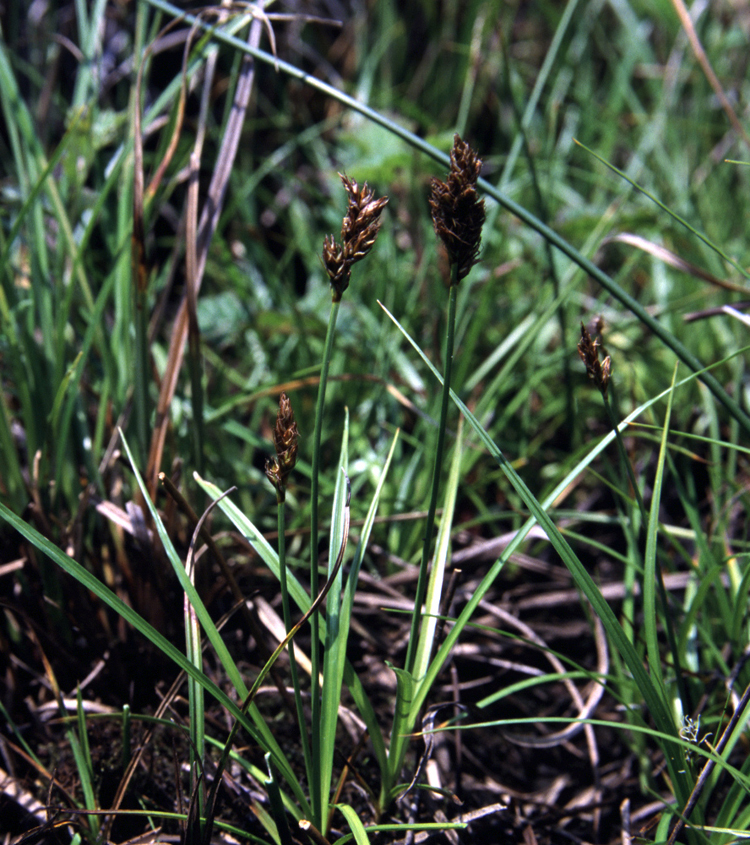

Scientific classification
- Kingdom: Plantae
- Clade: Tracheophytes
- Clade: Angiosperms
- Clade: Monocots
- Clade: Commelinids
- Order: Poales
- Family: Cyperaceae
- Genus: Carex
- Species: C. pansa

Binomial name
- Carex pansa L.H.Bailey

Synonyms
- Carex arenicola

= Carex pansa =

Species of grass-like plant

Carex pansa is a species of sedge known by the common name sand dune sedge. It is native to coast of western North America from British Columbia to California, where it grows in dunes and other sandy habitat. This grasslike sedge produces sharply triangular stems up to about 40 centimeters tall from a network of thin, long, coarse rhizomes. The inflorescence is a cluster of several spikes of dark brownish flowers. The plant sometimes produces only male or female flowers in its inflorescences, but not both. This sedge is sometimes used as a grass substitute in local landscaping schemes.
