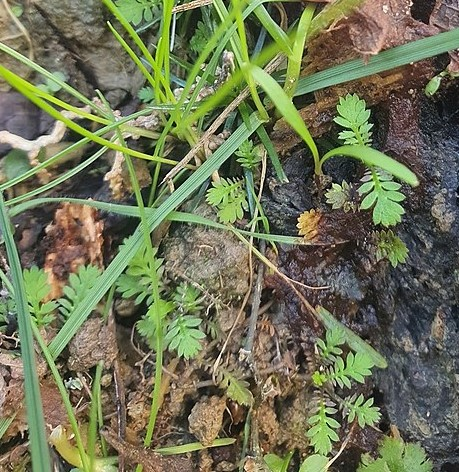
- Leptinella nana, a pygmy button daisy

Conservation status
- Nationally Critical (NZ TCS)

Scientific classification
- Kingdom: Plantae
- Clade: Tracheophytes
- Clade: Angiosperms
- Clade: Eudicots
- Clade: Asterids
- Order: Asterales
- Family: Asteraceae
- Genus: Leptinella
- Species: L. nana

Binomial name
- Leptinella nana (D.G.Lloyd) D.G.Lloyd & C.J.Webb, 1987

Synonyms
- Cotula nana D. Lloyd 1972

= Leptinella nana =

Species of flowering plant

Leptinella nana or pygmy button daisy is a species of flowering plant in the family Asteraceae. It is known from only three sites in New Zealand.

== Taxonomy ==
Leptinella nana was first collected from Tītahi Bay in 1907. It was described as a species in 1972 by David G. Lloyd, originally under the genus Cotula.Leptinella was reinstated as a genus in 1987 due to the distinctive shape of the corolla of their female florets, compared to other Cortula. It is closely related to L. filiformis and L. minor, which are also lowland and low–growing Leptinella.

== Description ==
Leptinella nana is a small, low–growing herb that grows in small patches, often joined with rhizomes that are visible at the ground surface. The leaves are small, green and either free of hairs or with fine sparse ones. Flowers are minute (1.5 to 2 mm wide), yellow–green and tubular.

== Habitat and distribution ==
This species is still found at the type location of Mount Pleasant in the Port Hills, Christchurch, New Zealand. Populations are also found at Rai Valley in Marlborough and Tītahi Bay, on the Wellington coast. L. nana requires small sites that undergo constant disturbance for it to be able to colonise bare soil. It is frequently outcompeted by other plants in damp environments and cannot persist in dry ones. These three sites have similar well draining soils, containing either sand, loess or clay.

== Conservation ==
Leptinella nana has the highest threat ranking of 'Nationally Critical' under the New Zealand Threat Classification System. Regular monitoring of L. nana occurs at all three known sites at least twice per year. This involves population density estimates, weeding around the plants to reduce exotic competitors and mapping of the daisy population. Specimens from the Mount Pleasant and Tītahi Bay populations are being cultivated at numerous sites, including Mana Island, Otari and Christchurch Botanic Gardens.
