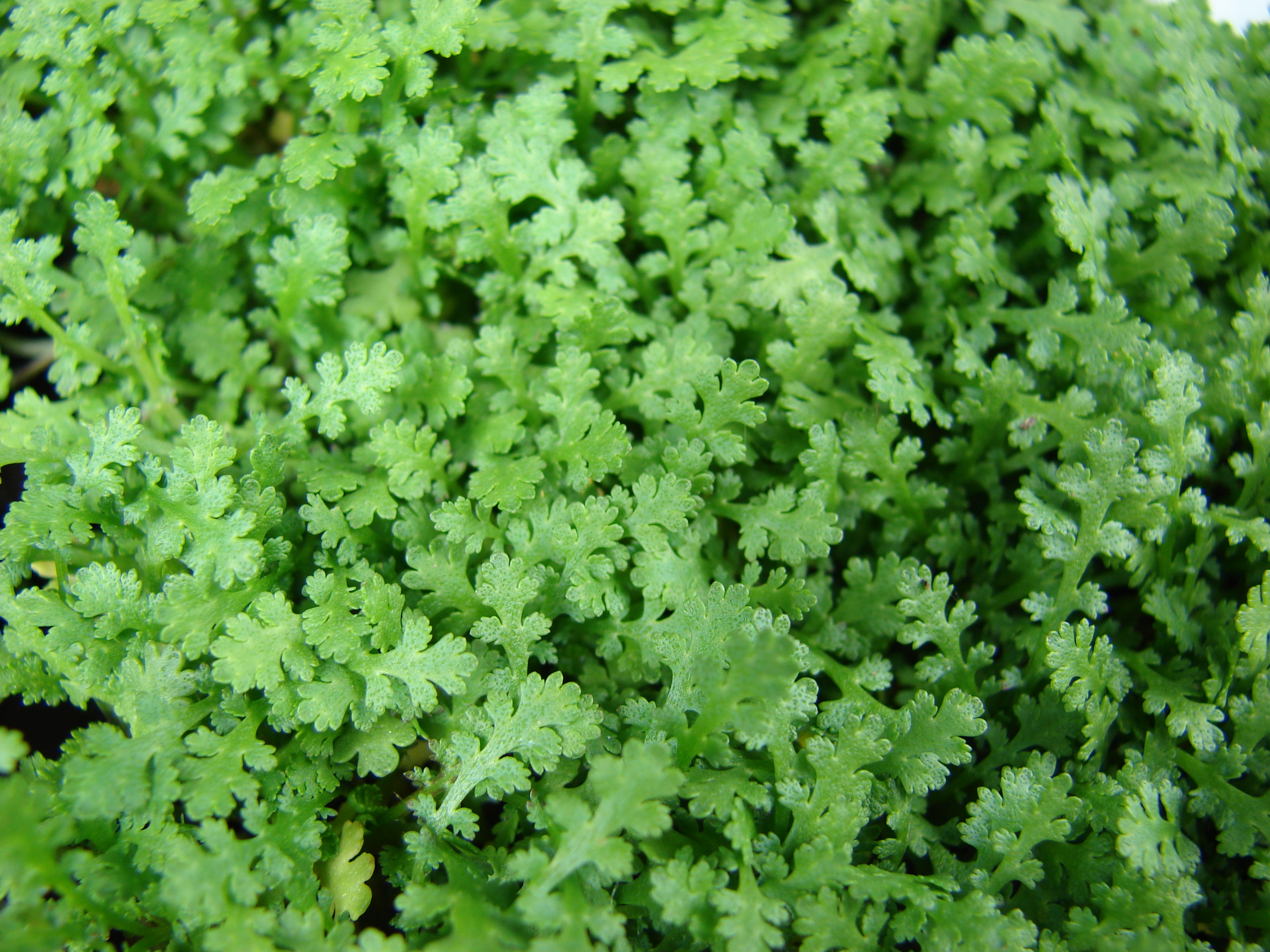
- Leptinella gruveri

Scientific classification
- Kingdom: Plantae
- Clade: Embryophytes
- Clade: Tracheophytes
- Clade: Angiosperms
- Clade: Eudicots
- Clade: Asterids
- Order: Asterales
- Family: Asteraceae
- Subfamily: Asteroideae
- Tribe: Anthemideae
- Genus: Leptinella; Cass.

Synonyms
- Cotula sect. Leptinella (Cass.) Hook.f.; Symphyomera Hook.f.

= Leptinella =

Genus of flowering plants

Leptinella is a genus of alpine flowering plant in the family Asteraceae, comprising 33 species, distributed in New Guinea, Australia, New Zealand, South Africa, and South America. Many of the species are endemic to New Zealand.

For over 100 years, Leptinella species were considered part of the genus Cotula, but the genus Leptinella was reinstated by Lloyd & Webb in 1987. They determined that all species of Leptinella are distinguished from those of the other two sections of Cotula, and other Anthemideae, by the conspicuous "inflated" corollas of the female florets and by chromosome numbers based on x = 26 where known.

Leptinella squalida 'Platt's Black' is a form cultivated as a garden plant, and is used for ground cover and as a component in tapestry lawns.

Species

- L. albida – New Zealand
- L. atrata – Black Daisy – New Zealand
- L. calcarea – New Zealand
- L. dendyi – New Zealand
- L. dioica – New Zealand
- L. dispersa – New Zealand
- L. drummondii – Western Australia
- L. featherstonii – New Zealand incl Chatham Islands
- L. filiformis – New Zealand
- L. goyenii – New Zealand
- L. intermedia – New Zealand
- L. intricata – South Africa
- L. lanata – New Zealand
- L. maniototo – New Zealand
- L. membranacea
- L. minor – Alpine Brass Buttons – New Zealand
- L. nana – New Zealand
- L. pectinata – New Zealand
- L. peduncularis
- L. plumosa – New Zealand, various subantarctic islands
- L. potentillina – Chatham Brass Buttons – Chatham Islands
- L. pusilla – Purple Brass Buttons – New Zealand
- L. pyrethrifolia – New Zealand
- L. reptans – South Australia, Victoria, Tasmania
- L.rotunda – New Zealand
- L. rotundata – New Zealand
- L. sarawaketensis – New Guinea
- L. scariosa – southern Chile, southern Argentina
- L. serrulata – New Zealand
- L. squalida – New Zealand
- L. traillii – New Zealand
- L. wilhelminensis – New Guinea
