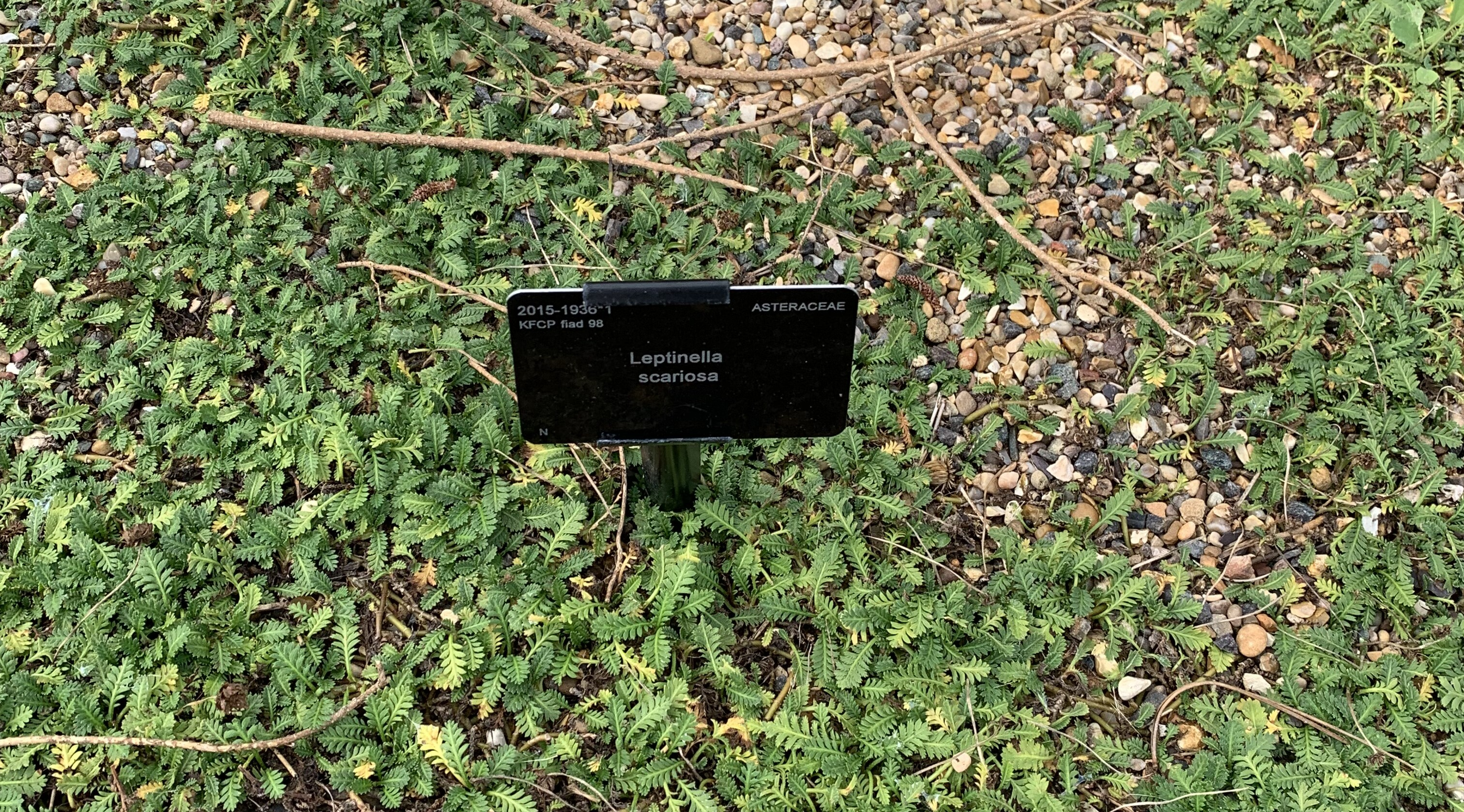
- Leptinella scariosa at Kew Gardens

Scientific classification
- Kingdom: Plantae
- Clade: Tracheophytes
- Clade: Angiosperms
- Clade: Eudicots
- Clade: Asterids
- Order: Asterales
- Family: Asteraceae
- Genus: Leptinella
- Species: L. scariosa

Binomial name
- Leptinella scariosa (Cass.)

Synonyms
- Cotula acaenoides Macloskie; Cotula hombronii Franch.; Cotula scariosa Franch.; Leptinella acaenoides var. major Hook. & Arn.

= Leptinella scariosa =

Species of flowering plant

Leptinella scariosa is a small flowering plant in the daisy family, native to Argentina, Chile, and the Falkland Islands. Its specific epithet, scariosa is derived from Latin, meaning membranous or scar-like.
