= Clover lawn =

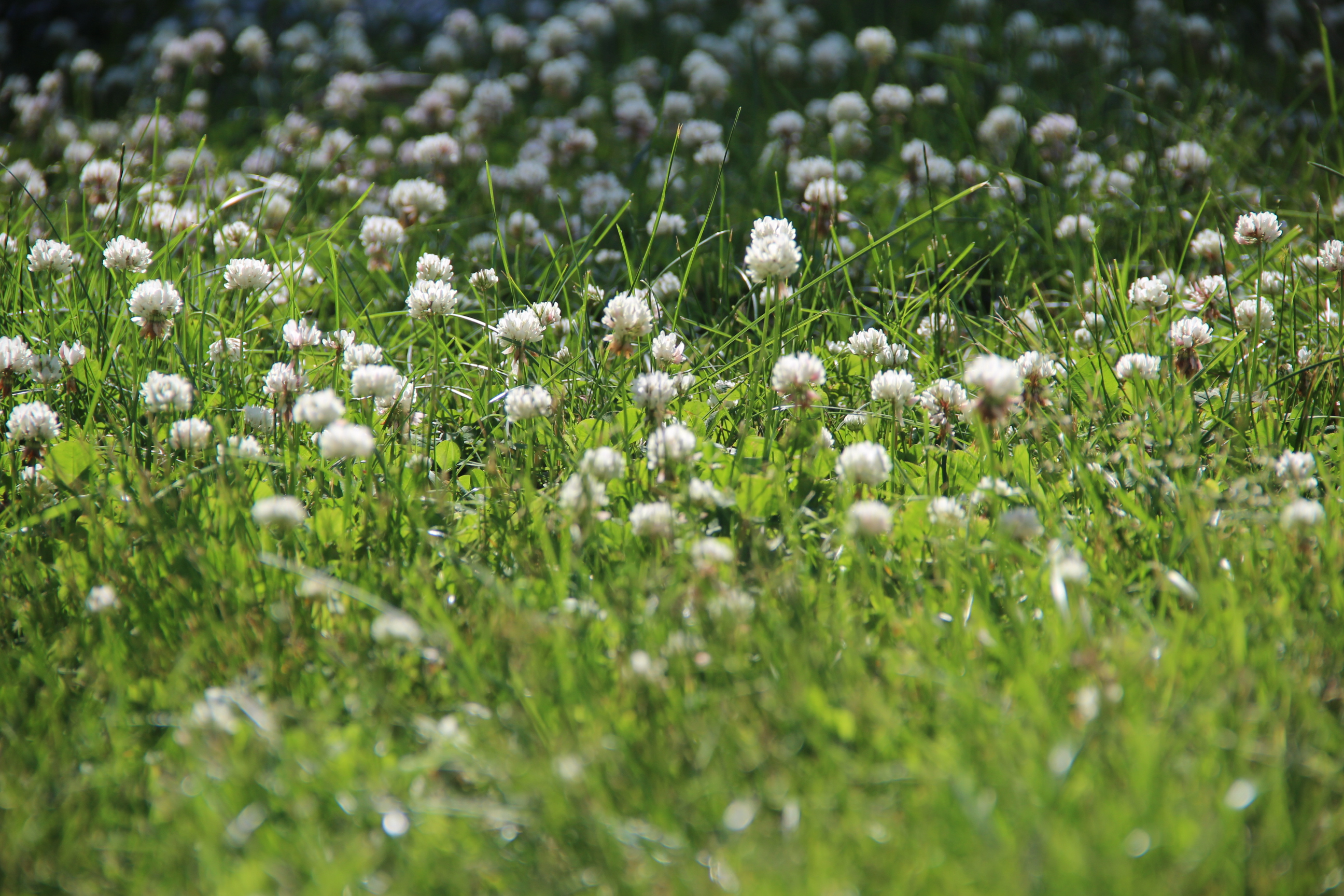
White clover present in a lawn

A clover lawn is composed of clover and can be used as an alternative to grass lawns. It requires less maintenance than a traditional lawn, uses less water, is more heat-tolerant, and fixes its own nitrogen using symbiotic bacteria in its root nodules, removing the need to fertilize. It is less robust to foot traffic than grass, and can stain clothes if bruised. Clover can be oversown on grass if some grass in the lawn is acceptable. If the variety chosen does not self-seed efficiently in place, it may need resowing every few years. If grown continually, it may be susceptible to clover sickness.

White clover is the plant most frequently used, sometimes in dwarf cultivars such as 'Pirouette' and 'Pipolina'. Red clover is also used, but is less resistant to treading, cropping, and disease, and needs more frequent reseeding. Tall crimson or incarnate clover, and shorter, more shade-tolerant strawberry clover, are also used.

There are 240 species of true clover, most of which are native to Eurasia, but some of which are naturally found in parts of Africa and the Americas. Clover is traditionally used as a field crop, so there are many commercial cultivars. Many clover species have been introduced to areas in which they are not native, where they displace native species, so native alternatives are recommended for cultivation.

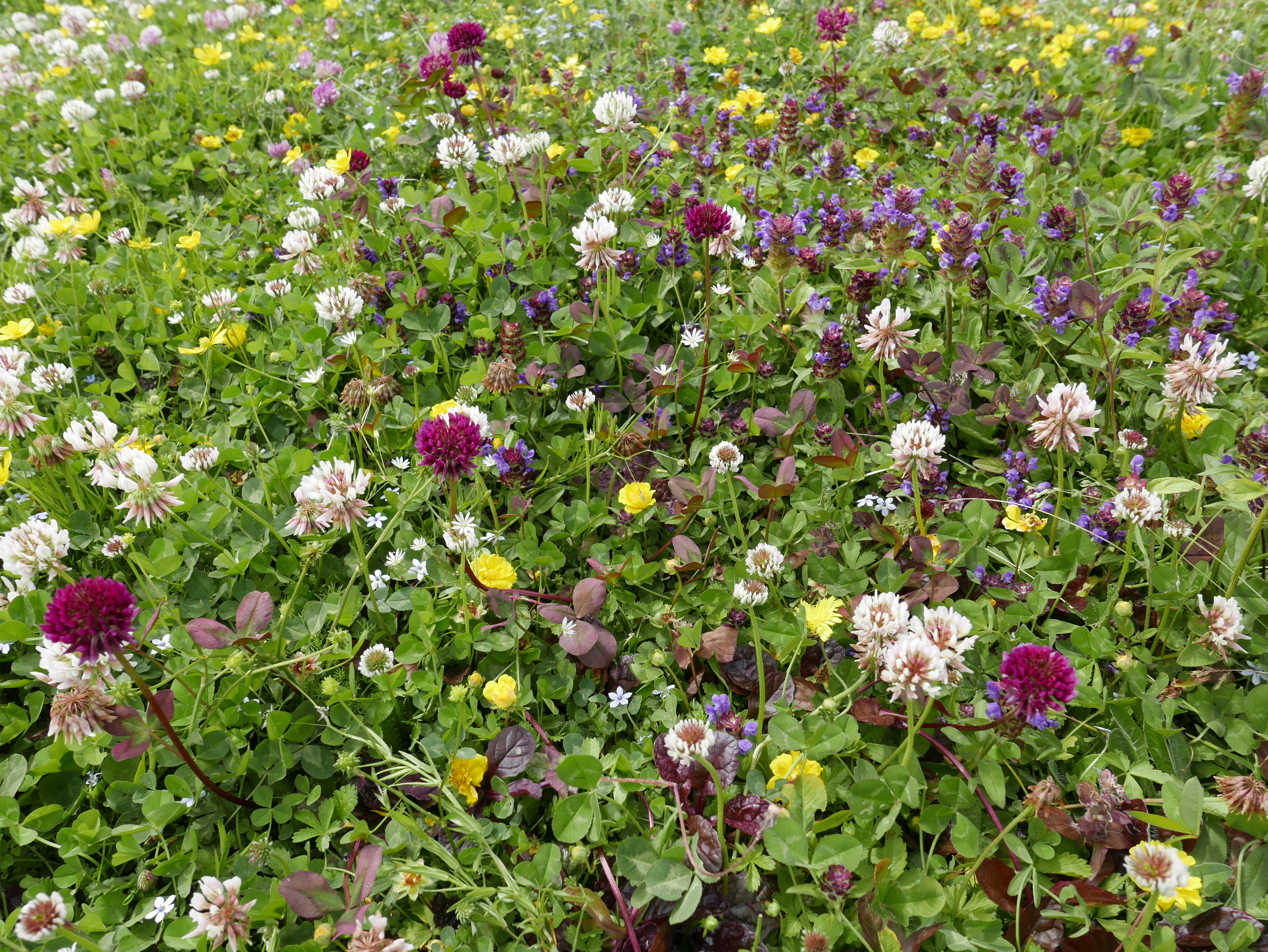
Close-up of a tapestry lawn with both white and red clover.

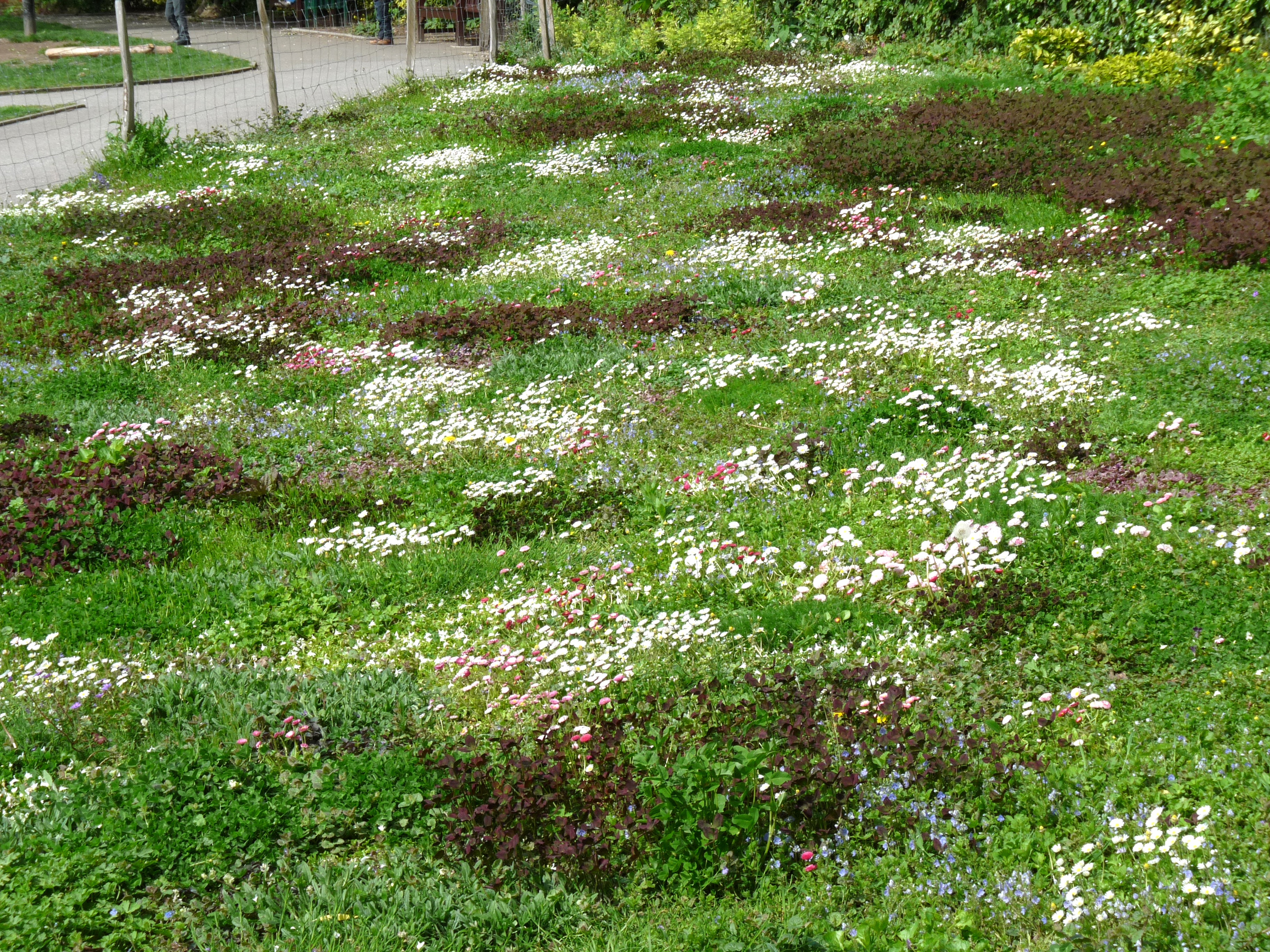
The swathes of red and bright green in this tapestry lawn are clover.

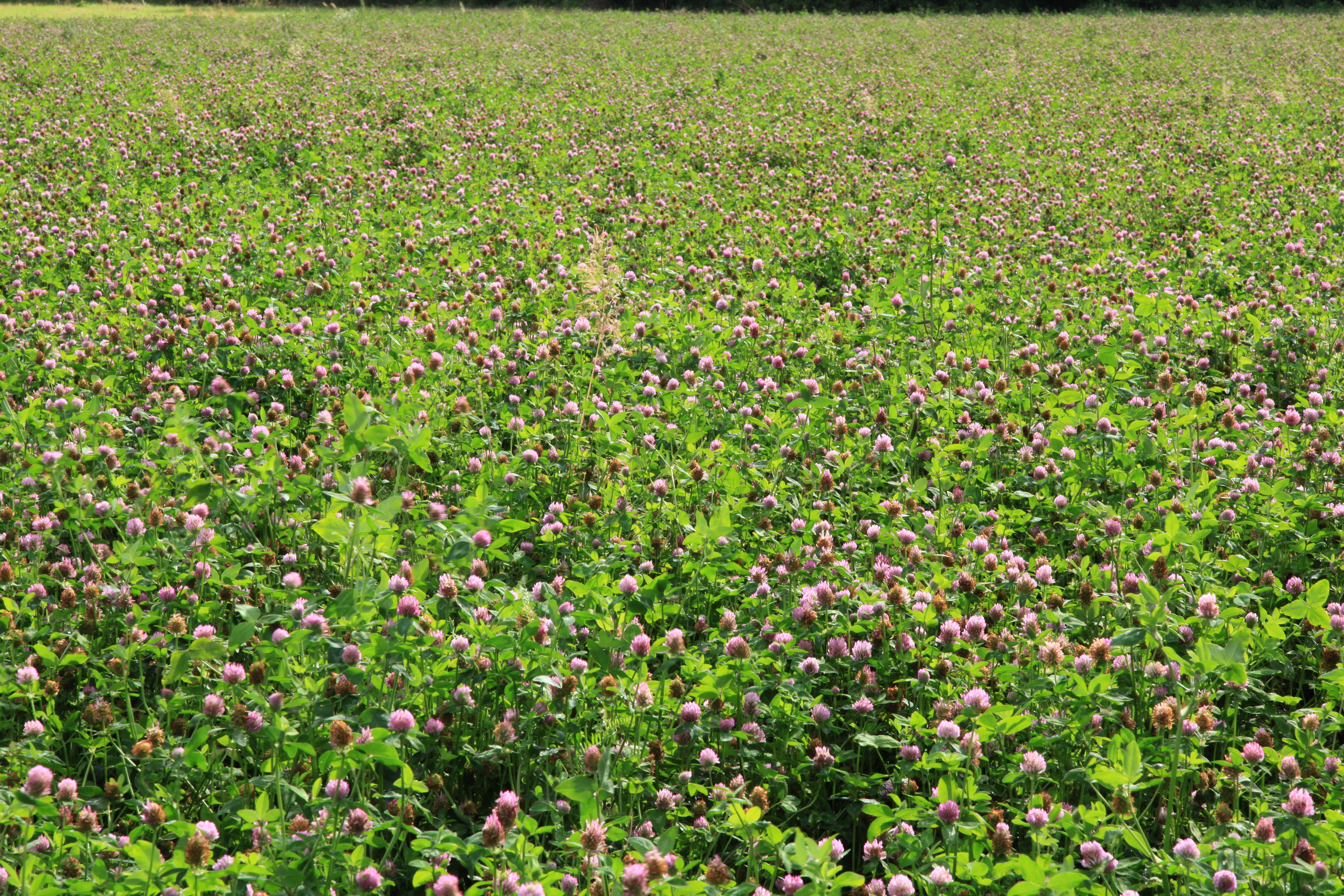
Field of red clover, 'Harmonie' cultivar.

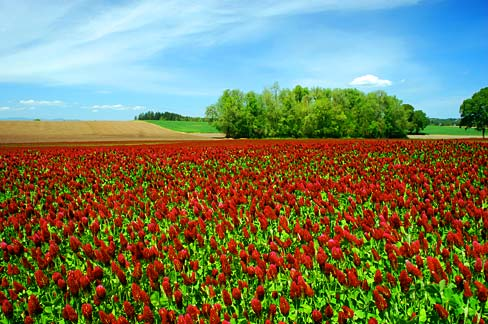
Field of incarnate clover, also called crimson clover.

== Trend ==
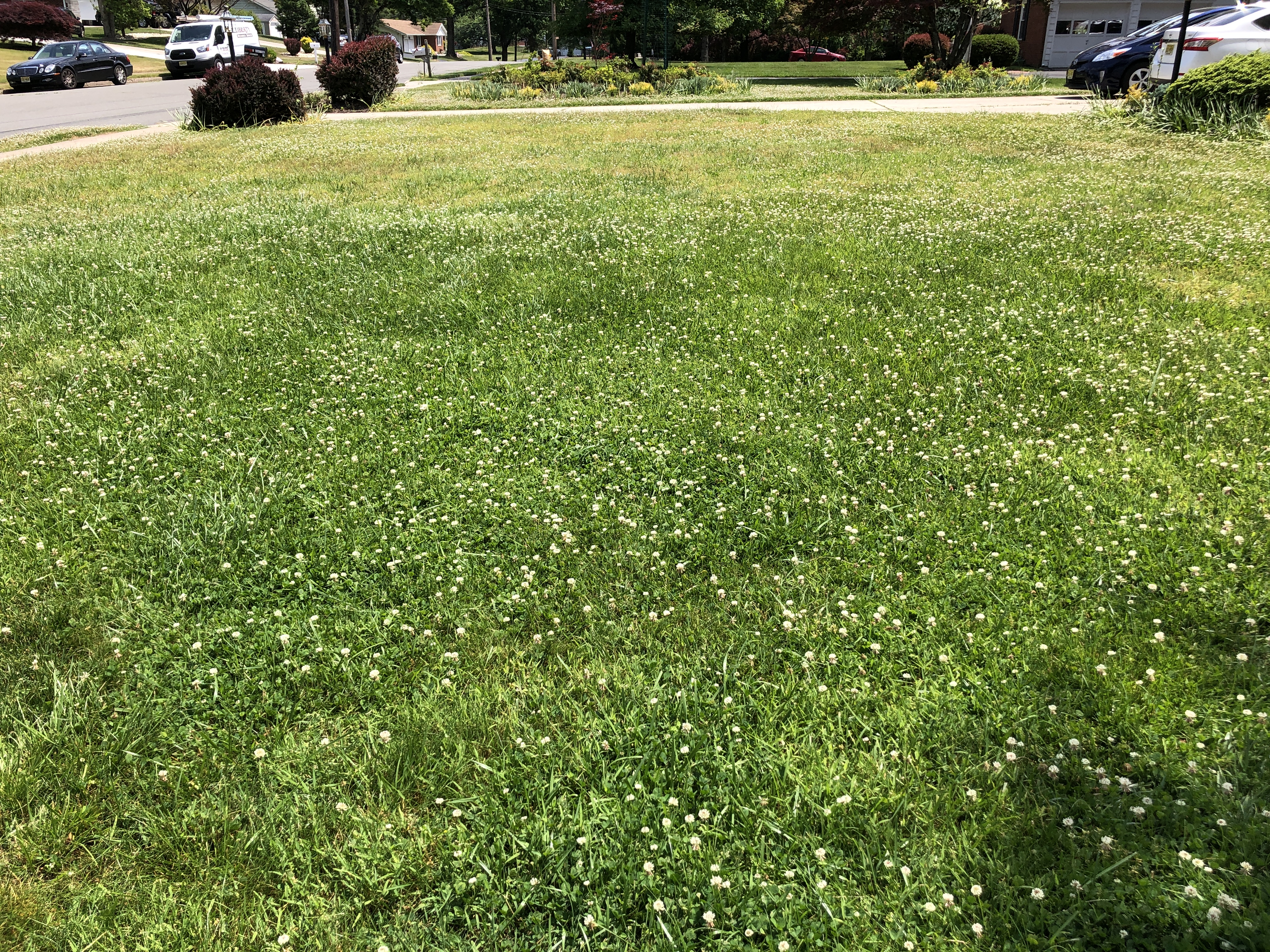
Clover was historically deliberately added to lawn seed mixes. Lawn in New Jersey.

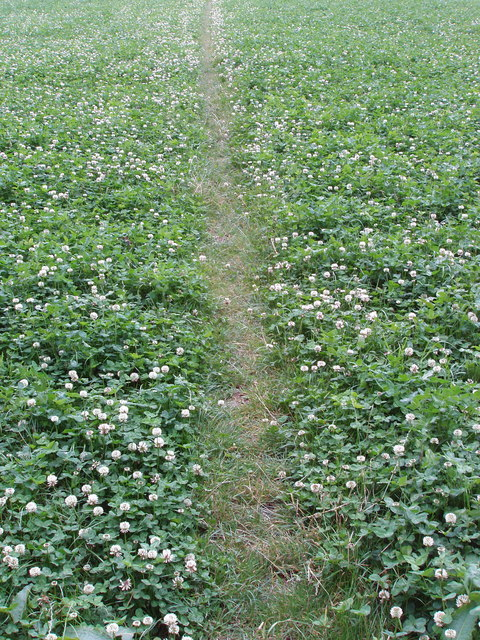
Footpath in white clover

Clover lawns have grown in popularity, along with other grass alternatives, becoming trends shared across social media platforms like TikTok. As a trend, clover lawns gained widespread attention in 2023, being Google's most searched for home improvement. Historically, particularly in the early 1900s, clover was often intentionally included in turf mixes. After the widespread adoption of herbicides for lawn maintenance, clover eventually became undesirable. Then, clover was typically dealt with as a weed before its newfound resurgence. Clover appeals to homeowners who wish to be more environmentally friendly.

Clover lawns are also promoted for erosion control and no-mow highway verge plantings.

== Usage and maintenance ==
White clover, commonly used in clover lawns, attracts pollinators and can have a beneficial effect on local nectar production. It is also a nitrogen fixing plant. White clover is able to withstand damp environments and can be desirable in areas prone to flooding. It is less suited to shaded areas. Clover also functions as groundcover and can reduce a homeowner's reliance on fertilizer, leading to its desirability among consumers. To maintain a height of about 3 to 4 inches, it can be mowed every four to six weeks. Other homeowners allow the clover to grow taller and only mow it a few times a year. Clover is also more robust in alkaline soils than grass. A technique, when clover is preferred to grass, is achieved by adding lime to the soil to encourage the clover to dominate the lawn. Research conducted in Iran and former usage shows that either alone or mixed with grass it is more resistant to heat and requires less water to be maintained.

Clover lawns are vulnerable to anthracnose and are not desirable in grass used for sports due to the leaves causing more slipping than grass. They are functionally desirable for people engaged in urban chicken keeping as they are useful as green forage for the birds. Clover can easily spread to other areas and may not be desirable for homeowners who wish to keep "distinct garden areas".

== See also ==
- Bouteloua dactyloides
- Companion planting
- Moss lawn
- Pollinator garden
