= Tapestry lawn =

Grassless lawn of diverse perennial forbs

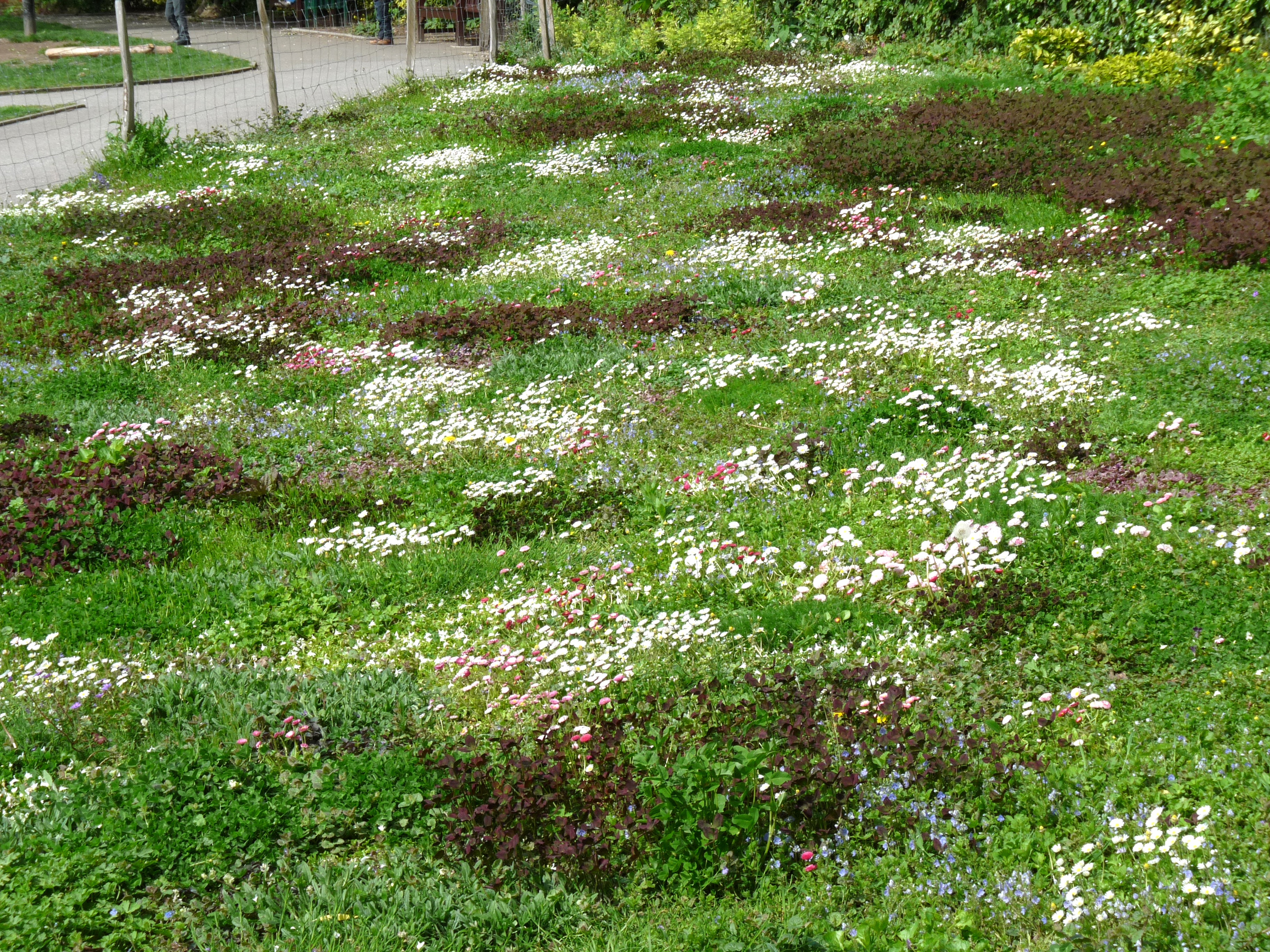
A tapestry lawn in Avondale Park, London. The area was previously grassed parkland.

A tapestry lawn (also referred to as a grass-free lawn) is a lawn made from a variety of different mowing-tolerant perennial forb species. The overall visual effect of the many species of plants grown together is referred to as a tapestry.

The format is based on research carried out at the University of Reading by Lionel Smith PhD. Developed with a temperate humid oceanic climate in mind, it applies ecological principles and horticultural practices to address some of the ecological and environmental issues associated with traditional grass lawns. Compared to a grass lawn, tapestry lawns have higher biodiversity of plants and pollinators alike, and need less mowing.

More diverse swards are generally more resistant to weeds, and improve soil nutrient retention, as different plants fill complementary niches.

== Management ==
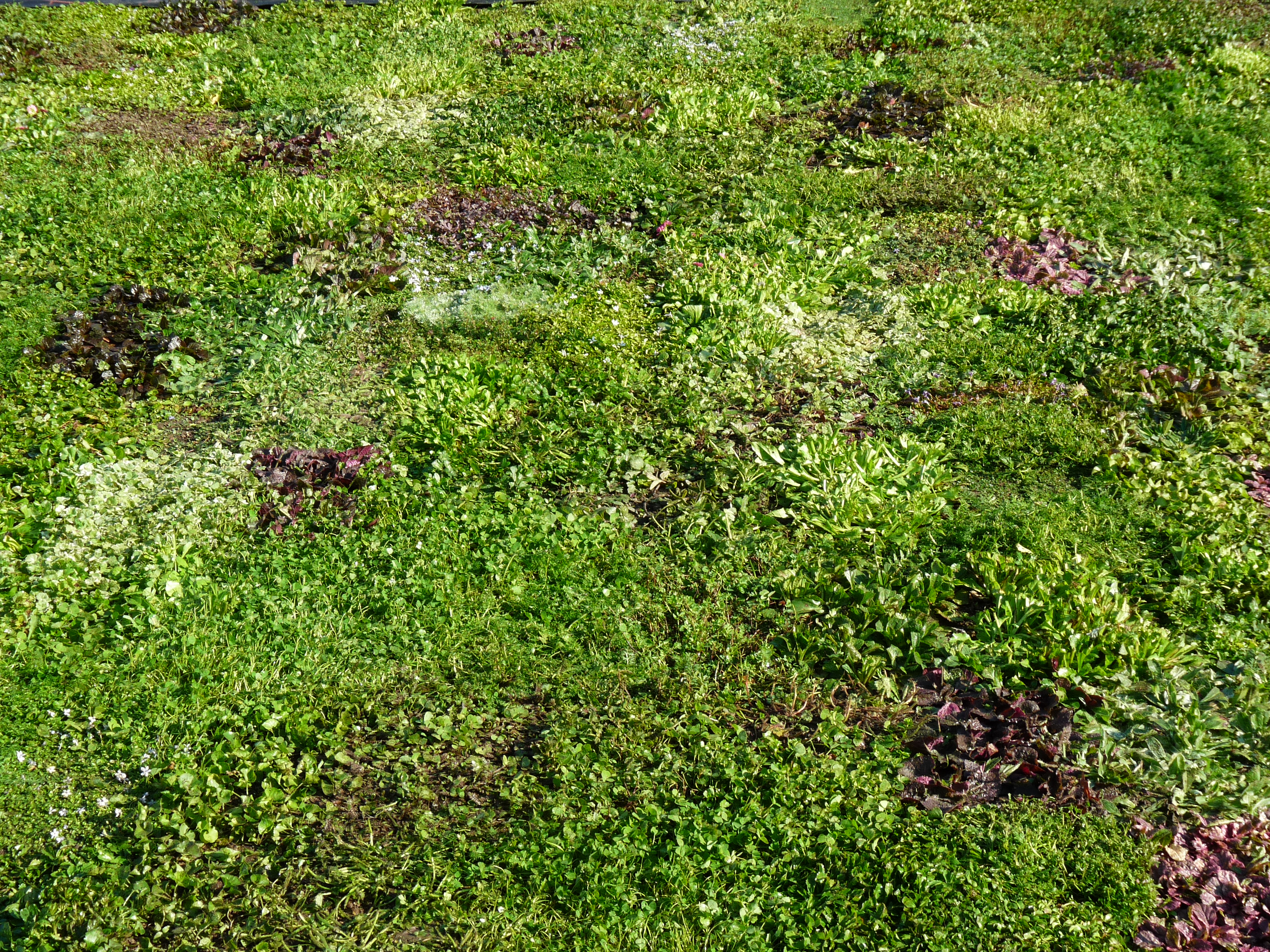
Tapestry lawn freshly mown, Reading University

The traditional practice of mowing is the key management tool for tapestry lawns. The need for a tapestry lawn to be mowed is reduced by up to two-thirds compared to traditional mowing regimes because of the absence of grasses and the growth patterns of forbs. A consequence of this is that greater numbers of both plant and insect species are able to inhabit the lawn.

== Mechanisms ==
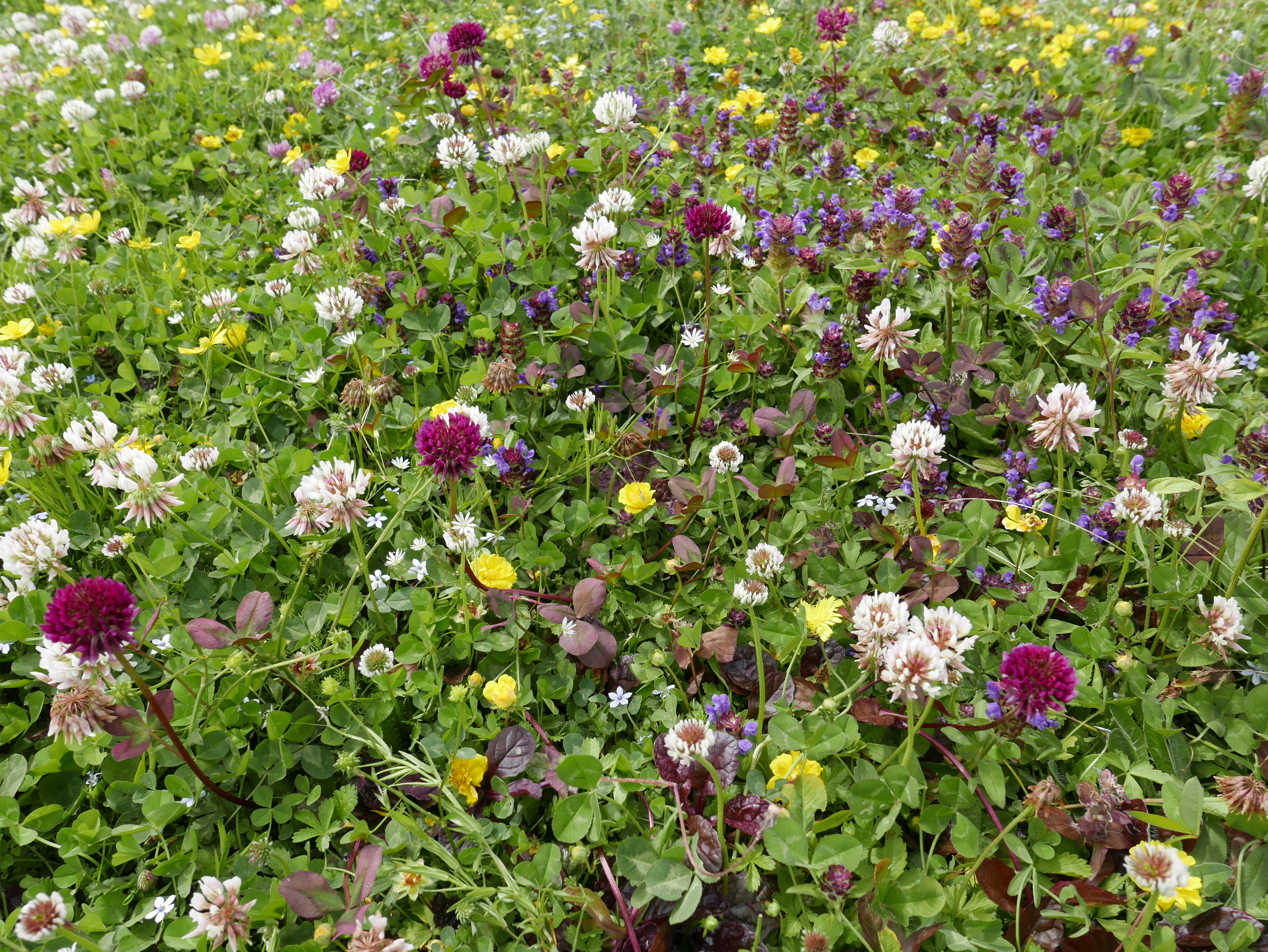
Tapestry lawn of British native species and nativars.

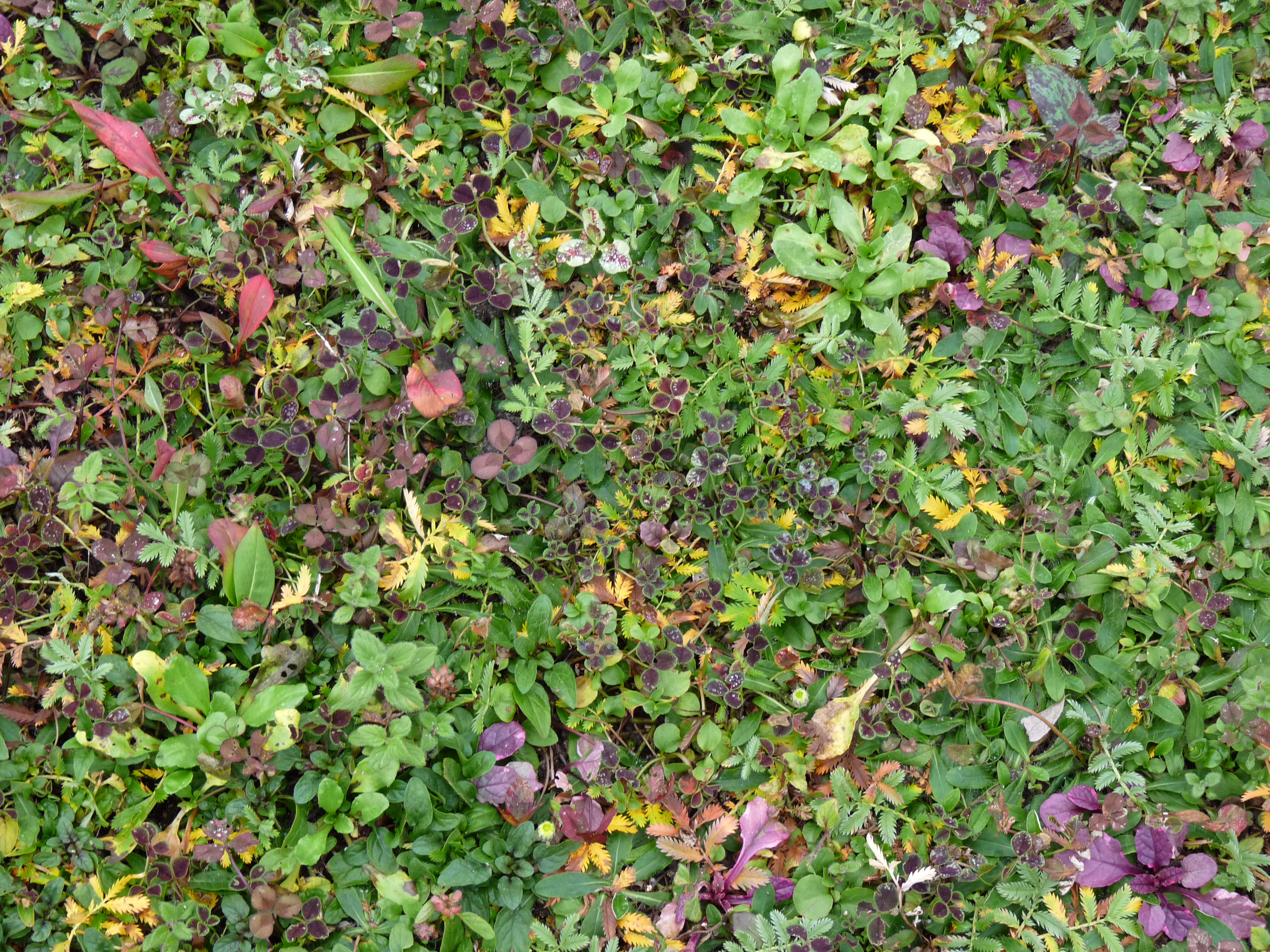
Tapestry lawn in autumn, Reading University

In tapestry lawns, mowing not only operates to maintain a low, lawn-like aesthetic and indicate ongoing care and management; it repeatedly modulates the light environment and intentionally creates physiological stress to the lawn plants. The relatively taller plant species used in a tapestry lawn, such as creeping buttercups (Ranunculus repens), gradually take up more of the available light as they grow, creating internal shade within the lawn and stressing the lower-growing plants e.g. Bellis perennis (daisy). When mowing is applied it removes the taller growth. This allows light to reach the light-starved low-growing plants and substantially stresses the tall plants by reducing their size and photosynthetic area. The plants cut by the mower stop growing and use reserves of carbohydrates to repair the damage. Once the damage has been repaired, they begin to regrow from a reduced-size plant. Meanwhile, the lower-growing and prostrate plants take advantage of the after-mowing window of opportunity to access light previously blocked. In this way both low-growing prostrate plants and the somewhat taller plants can be grown together. Repeatedly changing conditions mean advantage moves from tall plant to prostrate plant and back again in a cycle linked to the frequency of mowing. With no vertical-growing grasses, the need for mowing is substantially reduced. Tapestry lawns do not benefit from added fertilisers or traditional lawn interventions such as raking; these damage the plant community and the lawn and are best avoided.

== Biodiversity ==
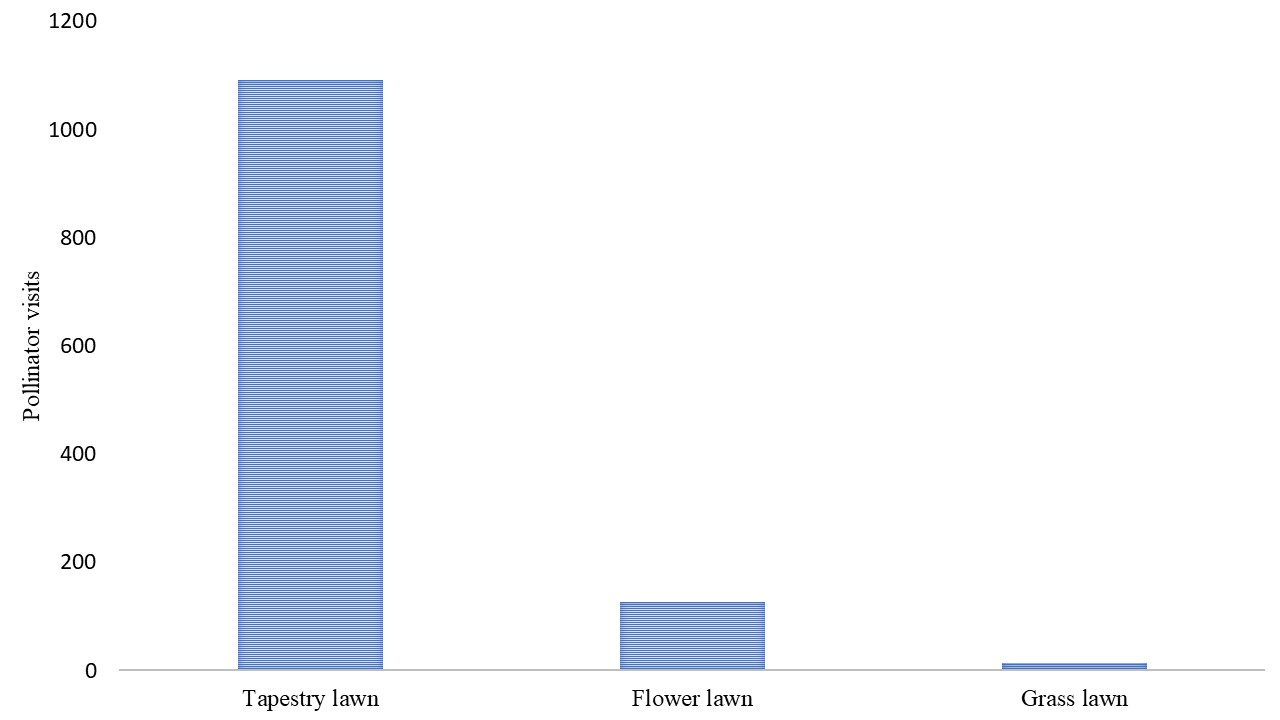
A graph showing the more pollinators in a tapestry lawn than in other types of lawns

An increase in plant diversity and decrease in mowing can increase the overall biodiversity of a green space. Mowing can cause insect mortality through both the action of mowing and the resulting reduced habitat for insects in the lawn. Reduced mowing regimes enabled by the tapestry lawn format offer protection and more abundant food resources for arthropods than a traditional grass lawn. The combination of multiple forb (non-grass) species extends the availability of pollen and nectar for pollinating insects. A study of pollinator interactions with Tapestry Lawns at Reading University (UK) suggests that they can be visited extensively by pollinating insects with around 80 times more pollinators visiting trial tapestry lawns than conventional lawns.

Access to blooms and long stems gives arthropods safe hiding places to hibernate. Growing a mix of both native and non-native plant species in tapestry lawns has been shown to increase insect abundance and diversity.

== Plants ==
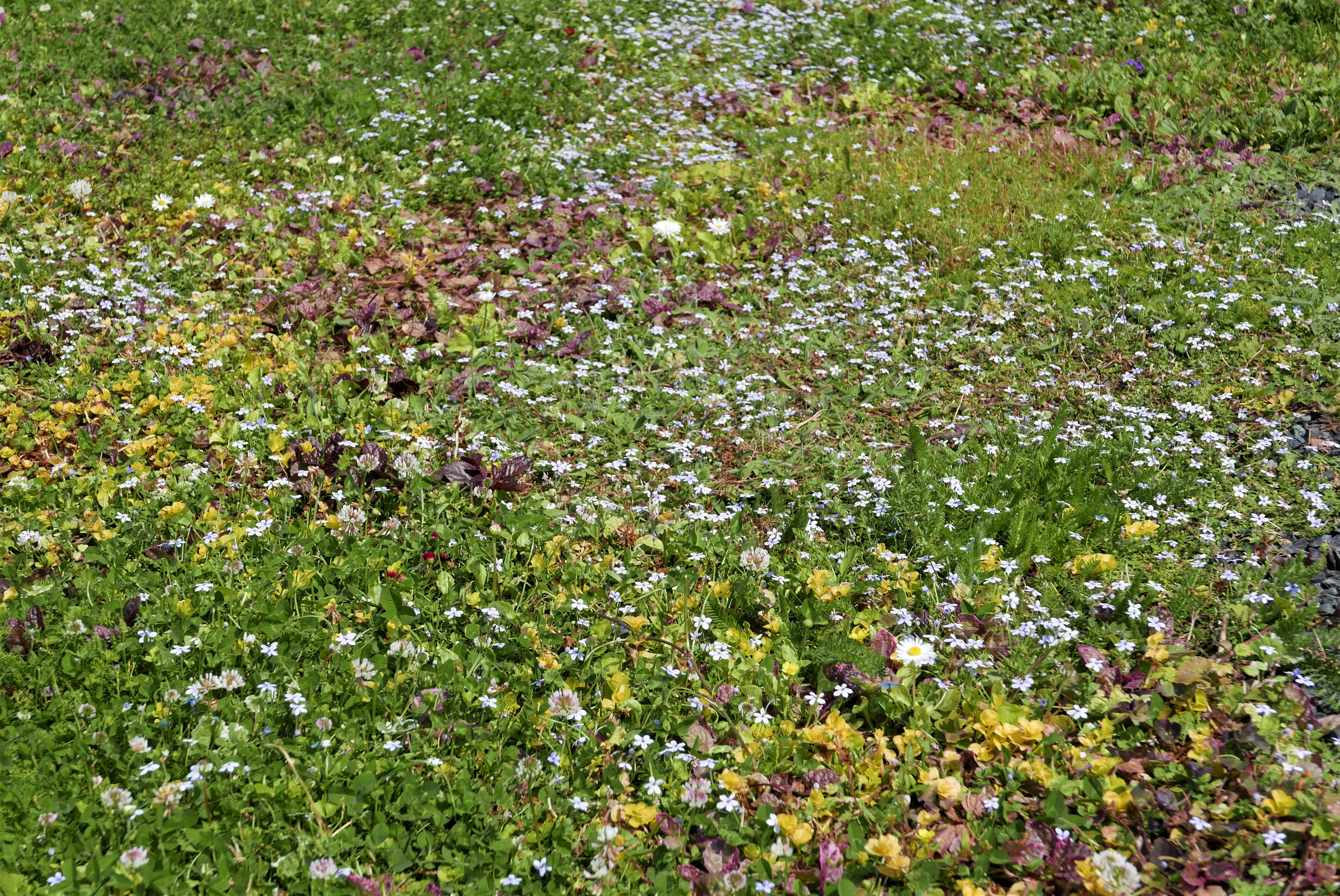
Tapestry lawn composed of native and non-native species.

Suitable plant species for the tapestry lawn tend to have origins in northwestern Europe, but can include species from other temperate regions:

- Acaena inermis (spineless acaena; native to New Zealand)
- Achillea millefolium (yarrow; native to temperate Asia, Euraope, and North America)
- Ajuga reptans (carpet bugle; native to Europe)
- Bellis perennis (lawn daisy; native to Europe)
- Chamaemelum nobile (camomile; native to Western Europe and North Africa)
- Glechoma hederacea (ground ivy or creeping charlie; native to Europe)
- Leptinella dioica (hairless leptinella; native to New Zealand)
- Lobelia pedunculata (matted pratia, blue star creeper; native to Australia)
- Lysimachia nummularia (moneywort, herb twopence and twopenny grass; native to Europe)
- Pilosella officinarum (mouse-ear hawkweed; native to Europe and North Asia)
- Ranunculus repens (creeping buttercup, creeping crowfoot; native to Asia, Europe, and northwest Africa)
- Trifolium repens (white clover; native to Europe and central Asia)
- Veronica chamaedrys (germander speedwell, bird's-eye speedwell; native to Europe)
- Viola odorata (wood violet, sweet violet, common violet; native to Europe and Asia)

The primary component species of tapestry lawns all show the capacity for clonal reproduction, usually via runners, rhizomes and stolons. Other component species include those that are able to successfully set seed in a mown environment e.g. daisies (Bellis perennis). Non-clonal species and those that do not manage to set seed in a mown environment can also be used, although these may require replacement at the end of their natural lifespan.

Some of the plants used have a role in providing simple ground cover (Leptinella sp) and evergreen cover in winter (Ranunculus repens). Some species can be herbaceous and give autumn foliage colour (Argentina anserina); some produce flowers and extend the floral season from spring to autumn (Veronica chamaedrys, Parochetus communis). The use of cultivars brings foliage effects (Ajuga reptans 'Burgundy Glow'), and allows for lawn gardening – where plants are added and subtracted according to requirements.

A wide variety of plant species is used, with a minimum of twelve different species and no upper limit, since environmentally unsuitable species will soon die out. When more species are used there is greater scope for aesthetic choices, extending floral period and resource opportunities for pollinating insects and less chance of any one species becoming dominant in the lawn.

== Establishment ==
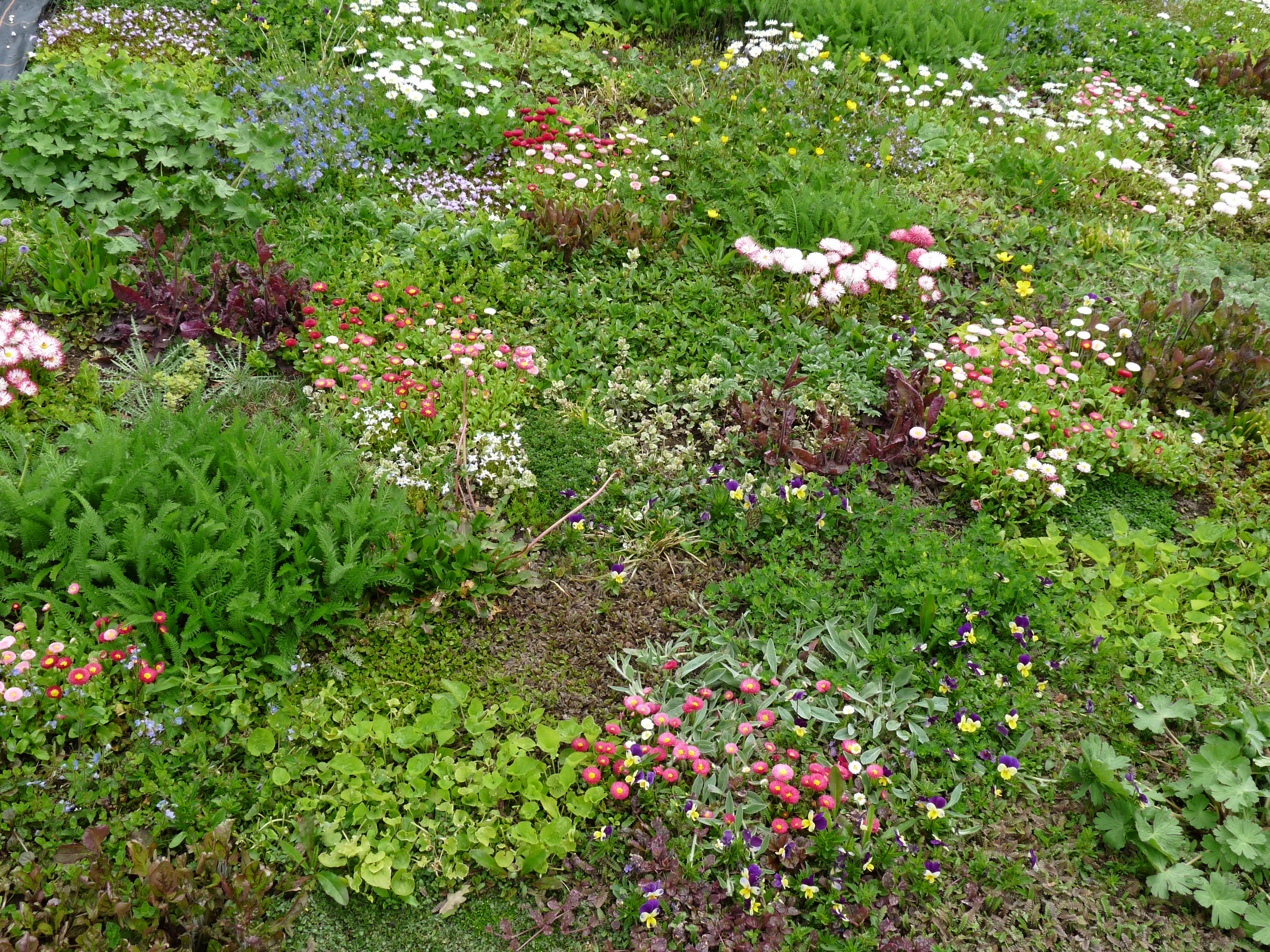
Recently planted tapestry lawn. Reading University.

Tapestry lawns can be established using seeds or plugs from forb species. Starting with plugs gives the immature forbs a higher probability of establishment and decreases the competition with germinating grass seeds in the soil seed bank. Plants should be selected for their ability to spread vegetatively, or have high rates of seed survival and germination, in order to cover any bare soil and decrease maintenance and replanting. Plants can be arranged in a random pattern or with a purposeful design. A mixture of colours, heights, textures, and flowering times is used to maximize the aesthetic appeal of the lawn throughout the year.

== See also ==
- Clover lawn
- Ground cover
- Lawn
- Moss lawn
