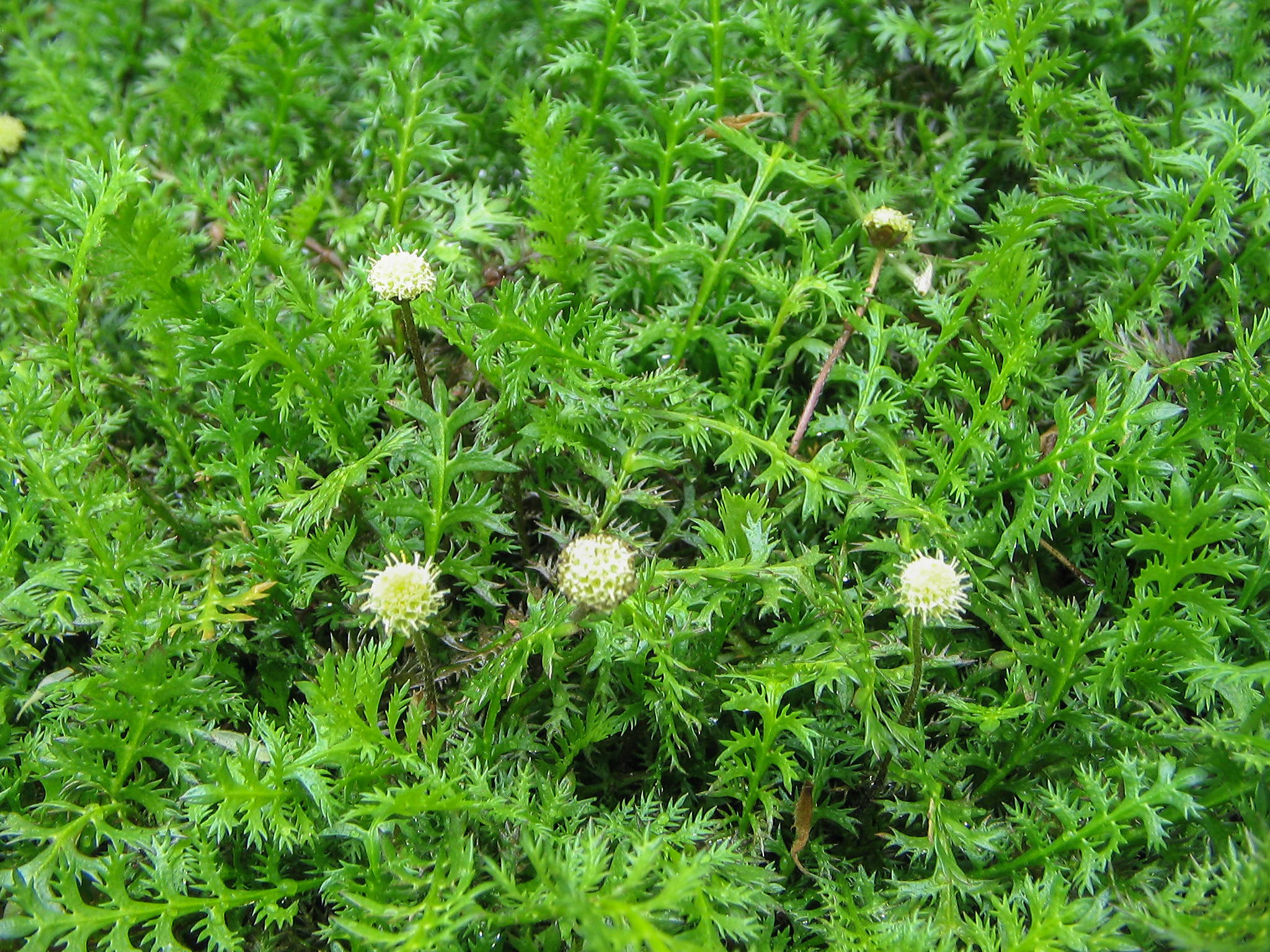

Scientific classification
- Kingdom: Plantae
- Clade: Tracheophytes
- Clade: Angiosperms
- Clade: Eudicots
- Clade: Asterids
- Order: Asterales
- Family: Asteraceae
- Genus: Leptinella
- Species: L. squalida

Binomial name
- Leptinella squalida Hook.f.

Synonyms
- Cotula squalida (Hook.f.) Hook.f.

= Leptinella squalida =

Species of flowering plant

Leptinella squalida is a species of flowering plant in the daisy family, native to New Zealand. Known as "brass buttons" for its yellow button-like flowers, it grows to about 5 cm (2 in) tall, spreading indefinitely via rhizomes.

A cultivar with almost black foliage, L. squalida 'Platt's Black', is grown as an ornamental plant, particularly in rock gardens and in flowering lawns.
