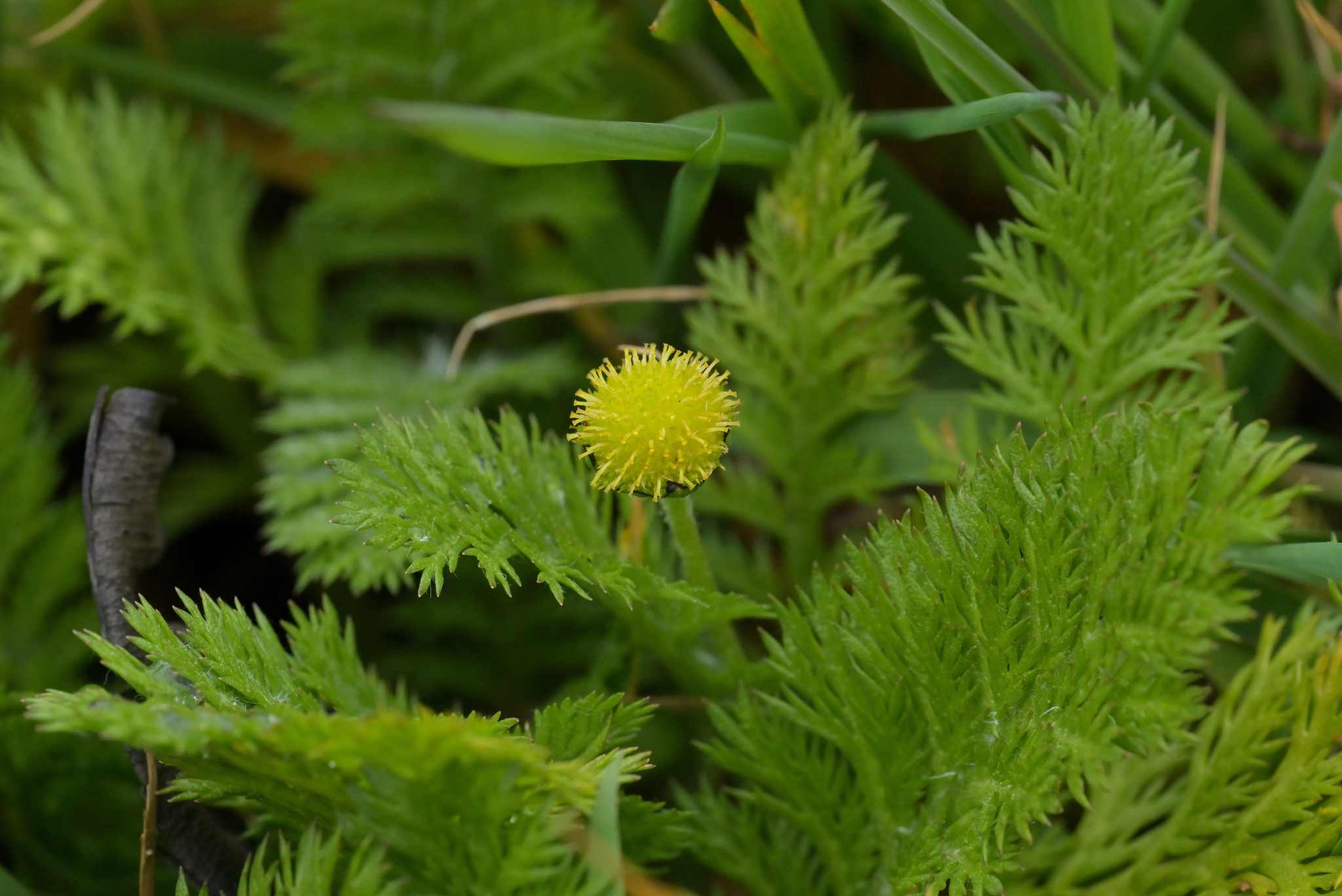

Conservation status
- Naturally Uncommon (NZ TCS)

Scientific classification
- Kingdom: Plantae
- Clade: Tracheophytes
- Clade: Angiosperms
- Clade: Eudicots
- Clade: Asterids
- Order: Asterales
- Family: Asteraceae
- Genus: Leptinella
- Species: L. plumosa

Binomial name
- Leptinella plumosa (Hook.f.)

Synonyms
- Cotula plumosa (Hook.f.) Hook.f.

= Leptinella plumosa =

Species of flowering plant

Leptinella plumosa is a small flowering plant in the daisy family. It is a circumantarctic species found on many subantarctic islands in the Southern Ocean. The specific epithet comes from the Latin for “feathery”, referring to the form of the leaves.

== Description ==
A highly variable species, Leptinella plumosa is a perennial herb that forms extensive mats. Its creeping stems, growing up to 5 mm in diameter, have short, lateral branches with leaves in terminal rosettes. It flowers from November to March, and fruits from February to May.

== Distribution and habitat ==
The plant occurs in the Auckland, Antipodes, Campbell, Macquarie, Kerguelen, Prince Edward, Heard and Crozet Islands. It is widespread in coastal areas and rare inland, but has been recorded at altitudes of up to 150 m above sea level.

== Conservation status ==
In both 2009 and 2012 it was deemed to be "At Risk - Naturally Uncommon" under the New Zealand Threat Classification System, and this New Zealand classification was reaffirmed in 2018 (due to its restricted range) but with a further comment that it is secure overseas.

== Gallery ==
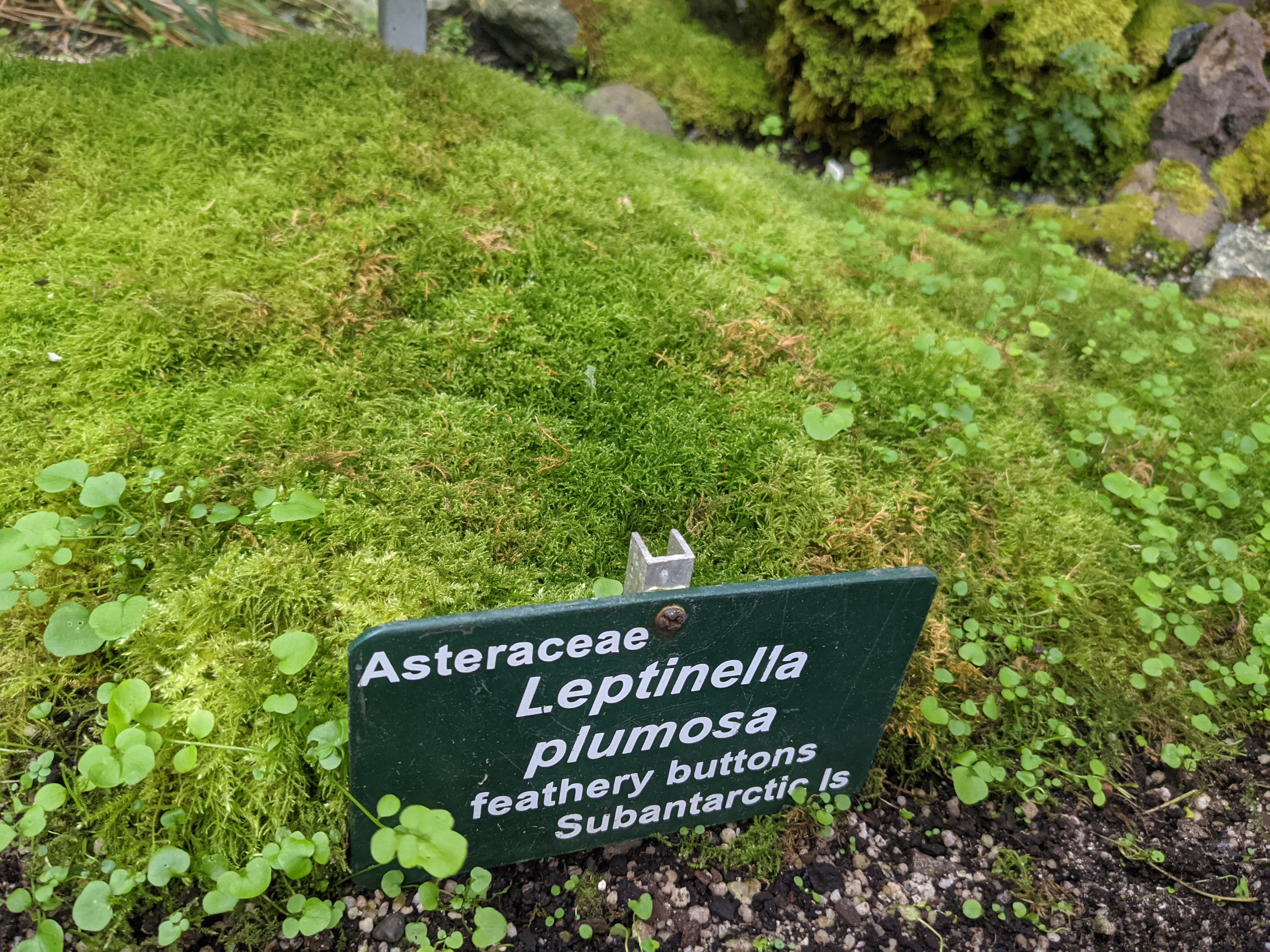
In Royal Hobart Botanical Gardens

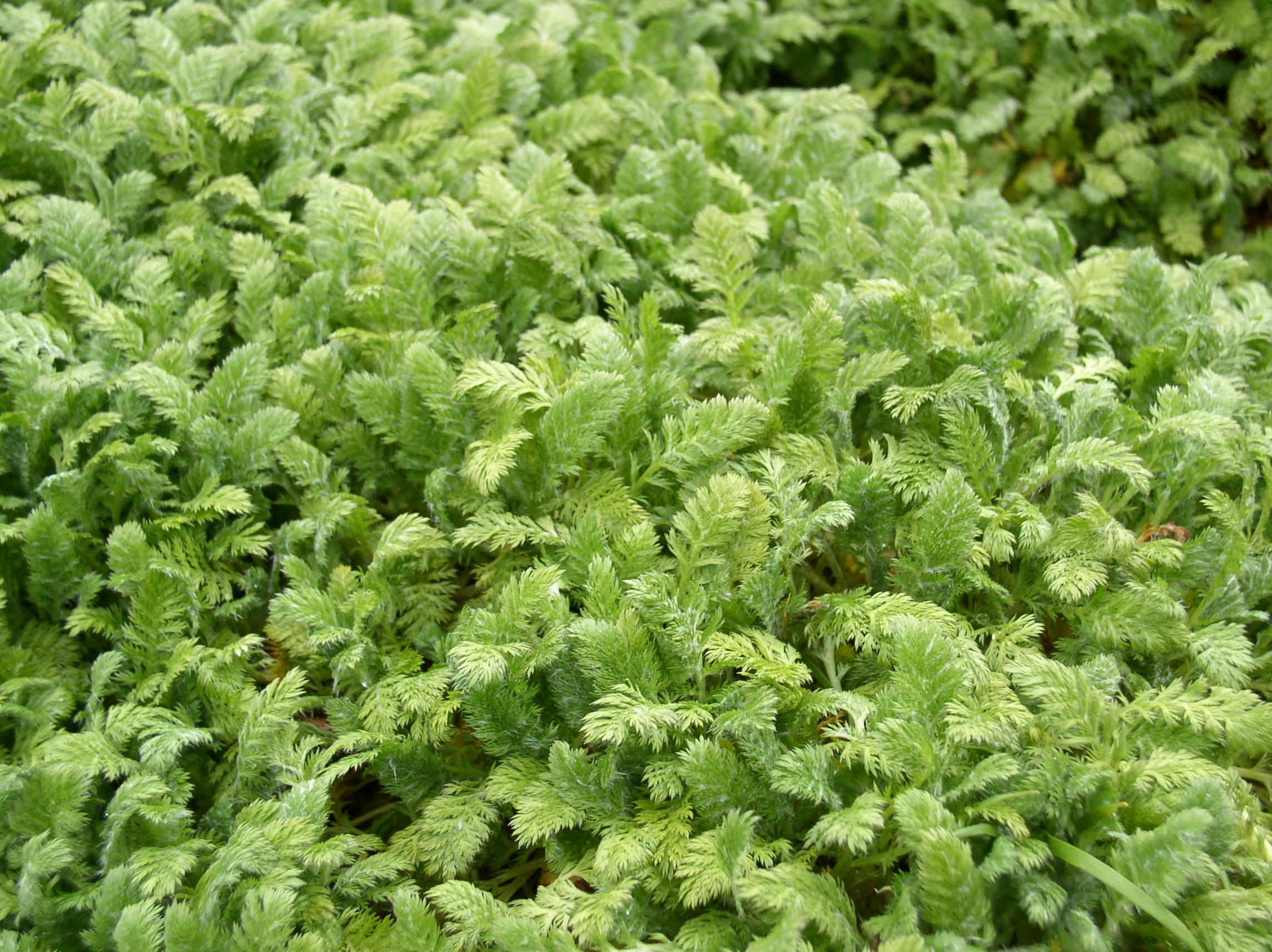
On Possession Island
