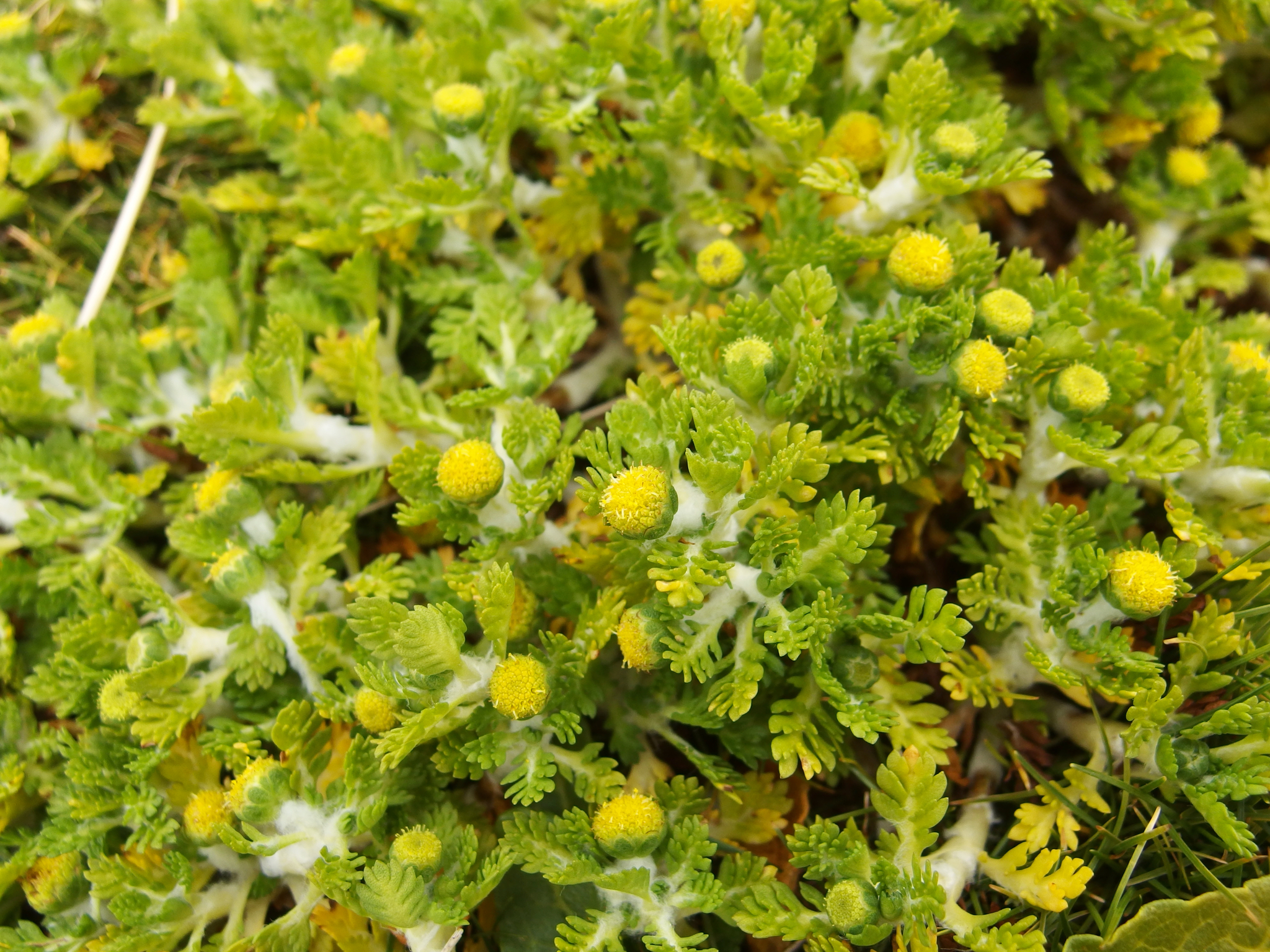

Conservation status
- Naturally Uncommon (NZ TCS)

Scientific classification
- Kingdom: Plantae
- Clade: Tracheophytes
- Clade: Angiosperms
- Clade: Eudicots
- Clade: Asterids
- Order: Asterales
- Family: Asteraceae
- Genus: Leptinella
- Species: L. lanata

Binomial name
- Leptinella lanata (Hook.f.)

Synonyms
- Cotula lanata Hook.f.

= Leptinella lanata =

Species of flowering plant

Leptinella lanata is a small flowering plant in the daisy family, native to the Antipodean Islands. Its specific epithet, lanata, describes its woolly-haired (lanate) rhizomes.

== Description ==
Leptinella lanata is a creeping perennial, monoecious herb.

== Distribution and habitat ==
It is found on the Auckland and Campbell Island and was recently found on Heard Island. It is a coastal species, found on rocks, on cliff tops, on damp exposed peat, in rock crevices and within nesting grounds and seal haul outs.

== Conservation status ==
In both 2009 and 2012 it was deemed to be "At Risk – Naturally Uncommon" under the New Zealand Threat Classification System, and this New Zealand classification was reaffirmed in 2018, due to its restricted range, and with the further comment that it is "data poor".
