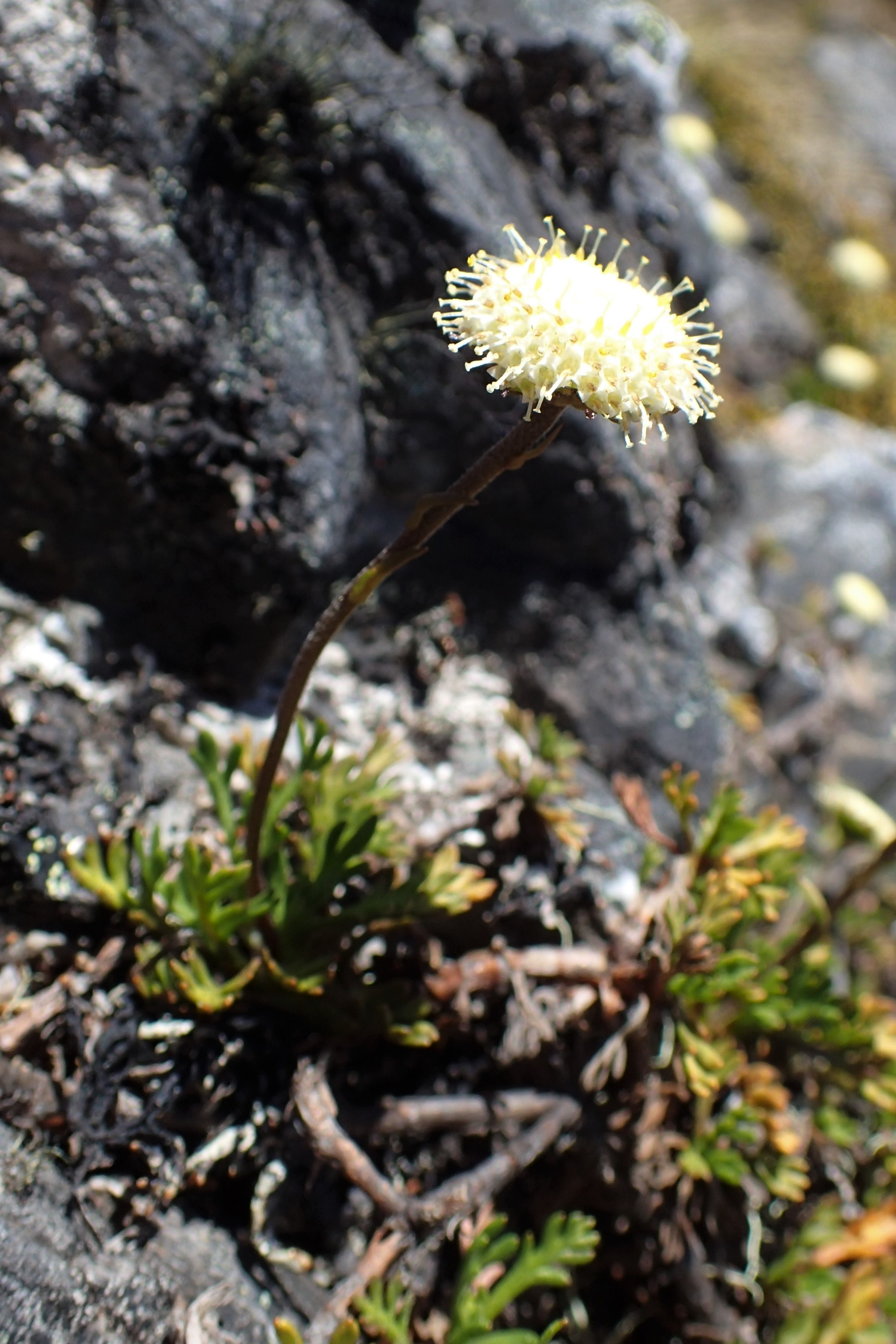
- L. pyrethrifolia in Lewis Pass

Conservation status
- Not Threatened (NZ TCS)

Scientific classification
- Kingdom: Plantae
- Clade: Embryophytes
- Clade: Tracheophytes
- Clade: Angiosperms
- Clade: Eudicots
- Clade: Asterids
- Order: Asterales
- Family: Asteraceae
- Genus: Leptinella
- Species: L. pyrethrifolia

Binomial name
- Leptinella pyrethrifolia (Hook.f.) D.G.Lloyd & C.J.Webb

= Leptinella pyrethrifolia =

Species of flowering plant

Leptinella pyrethrifolia, or button daisy, is a species of flowering plant, endemic to New Zealand. The flowers, formed in a round button-like capitula, are cream, white, or yellow. This species is found only in montane regions of New Zealand. One subspecies, linearifolia, is considered Naturally Uncommon, and is only found in the ultramafic Maungakura / Red Hill region of Nelson. The leaves are known to be aromatic, and along with the attractive flowers, lead this to be an occasional garden plant.

== Description ==
In the nominate subspecies, this plant is a perennial herb that grows prostrate or creeping. The rhizomes, green or red and woody, lay on the surface of the ground, and can form piles of living rhizomes on top of dead ones. The branches cluster off of central nodes, and the leaves can be far from the base of the branch. The leaves are pinnatifid, meaning that they are lobed and cleft, almost like ferns without the repeated branching on the split areas. They are green, and can have up to 40 lobes, each up to 10 mm in length. The inflorescence is called a capitulum (from the Latin for "little head") in this species, as the inflorescences are so dense together that they appear to be a single flowerhead.

There are two forms, as this flower is sexually dimorphic: a pistillate capitula, and a staminate capitula. The bracts beneath the pistillate capitula, the involucre, are hemispherical, while the capitula itself is flat or convex. The flowers are white, cream, or slightly yellow. The staminate capitula can be slightly longer, and is convex, with a flat involucre. Bisexual capitulae are intermediate between the two. The cypsela (or seeds) are golden brown.

The subspecies linearifolia does not have pinnatifid leaves (or rarely just with one or two lobes). It is also separated easily by range.

The flowers form November to January, in the summer.

This form differs from other species in Leptinella by its broad leaves, the general structure, and the white capitula.

== Range and habitat ==
The nominate subspecies is found on both main islands. In the North Island, it is found in and south of the Ruahines. In the South Island, it is found from Marlborough and Nelson to Canterbury. L. p. linearifolia is found only in Maungakura / Red Hill, which is ultramafic and serpentine and have a slightly different ecology than elsewhere in the region. Although it is uncommon globally, it is commonly found throughout this environment.

Both subspecies are found in montane regions, to the alpine environment, and is generally found near scree or rock fields, or water sources.

== Ecology ==
Only the nectar is utilized by the introduced honey bee.

== Etymology ==
The species is named after Pyrethrum, because of its leaves.

== Taxonomy ==
Leptinella pyrethrifolia contains the following varieties:

- Leptinella pyrethrifolia var. linearifolia. This species is considered Naturally Uncommon, due to its small range.
- Leptinella pyrethrifolia var. pyrethrifolia
