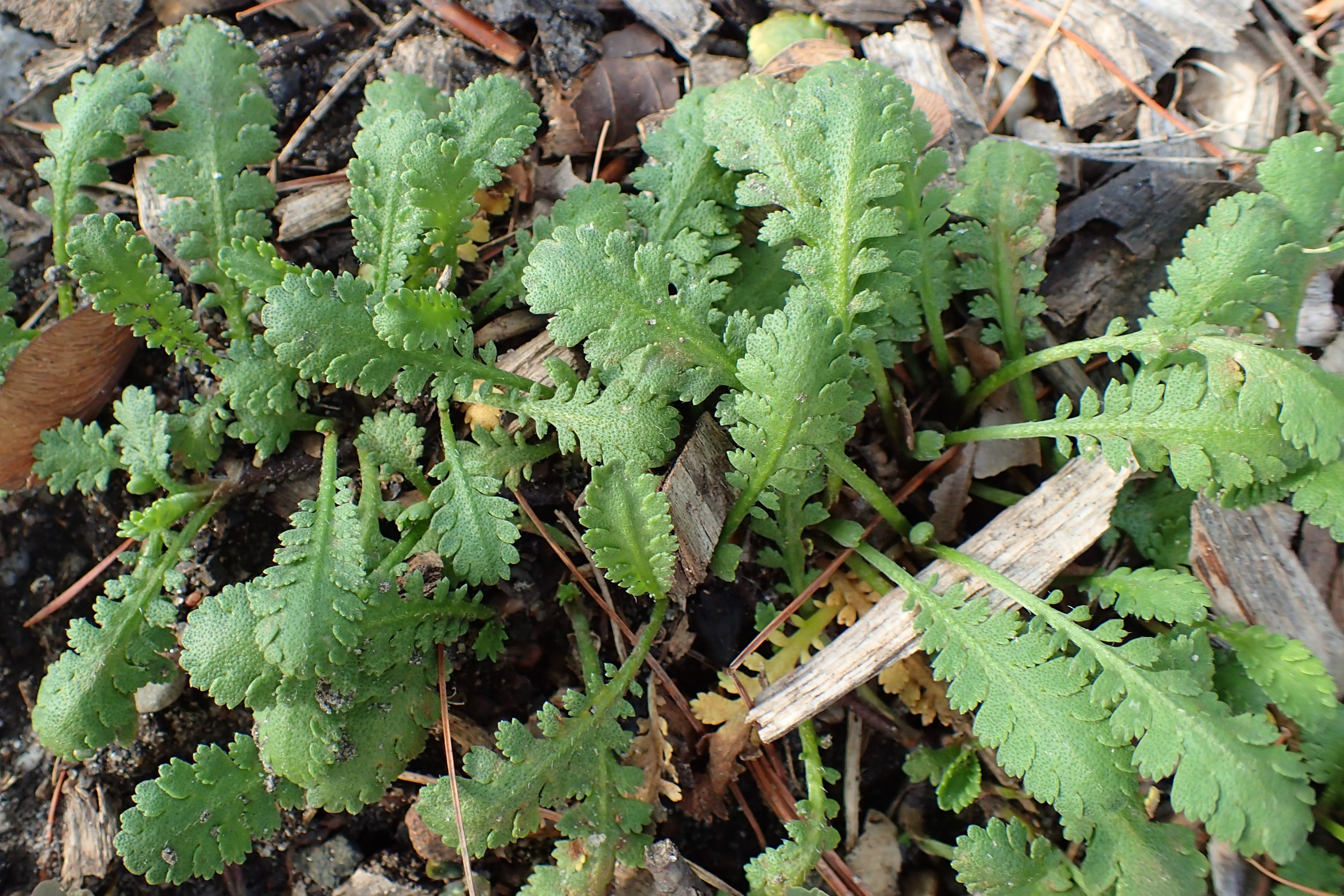
- Foliage
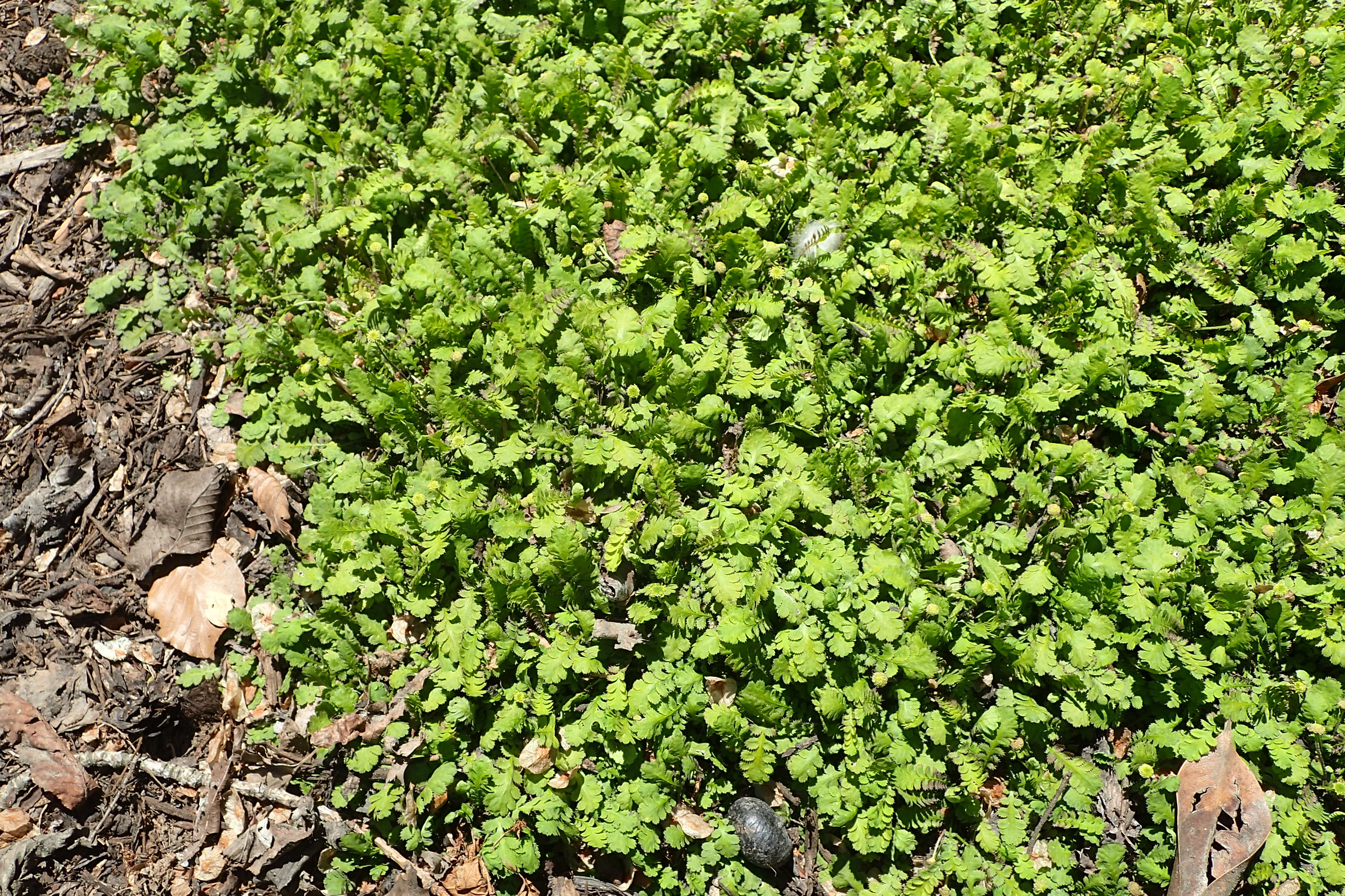
- At Christchurch Botanic Gardens

Scientific classification
- Kingdom: Plantae
- Clade: Tracheophytes
- Clade: Angiosperms
- Clade: Eudicots
- Clade: Asterids
- Order: Asterales
- Family: Asteraceae
- Genus: Leptinella
- Species: L. dioica

Binomial name
- Leptinella dioica Hook.f.

Synonyms
- Cotula dioica Hook.f.; Cotula dioica subsp. monoica D.G.Lloyd; Cotula obscura Kirk

= Leptinella dioica =

Species of plant

Leptinella dioica (syn. Cotula dioica), the hairless leptinella, is a species of flowering plant in the family Asteraceae, native to New Zealand, and introduced to Ireland. A mat-forming perennial useful as a ground cover, there are a number of cultivars, including 'Minima' and 'Seal Island'.

== Subtaxa ==
The following subspecies are accepted:

- Leptinella dioica subsp. dioica – North Island, South Island, doubtfully Antipodean Islands, introduced Ireland
- Leptinella dioica subsp. monoica (D.G.Lloyd) D.G.Lloyd & C.J.Webb – southern North Island
