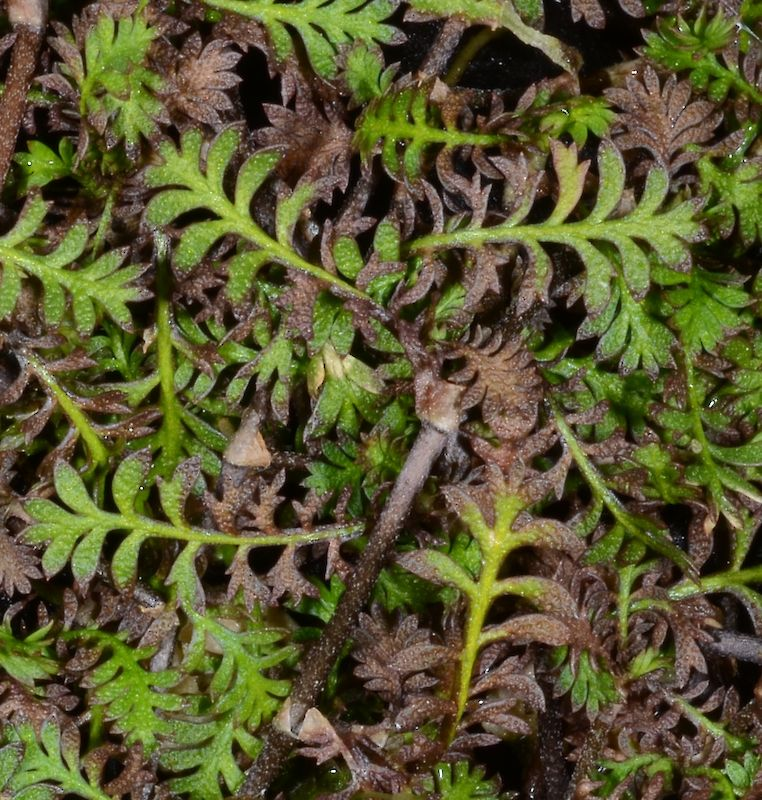

Conservation status
- Nationally Critical (NZ TCS)

Scientific classification
- Kingdom: Plantae
- Clade: Tracheophytes
- Clade: Angiosperms
- Clade: Eudicots
- Clade: Asterids
- Order: Asterales
- Family: Asteraceae
- Genus: Leptinella
- Species: L. filiformis

Binomial name
- Leptinella filiformis (Hook.f.) D.G.Lloyd & C.J.Webb

Synonyms
- Cotula filiformis Hook.f.

= Leptinella filiformis =

Species of flowering plant

Leptinella filiformis, or slender button daisy, is a species of flowering plant in the daisy family, found only in the north-eastern part of the South Island of New Zealand. Thought to be extinct by the 1980s, it was rediscovered growing on a Hanmer Springs hotel lawn in 1998, and in the wild in 2015.

== Description ==
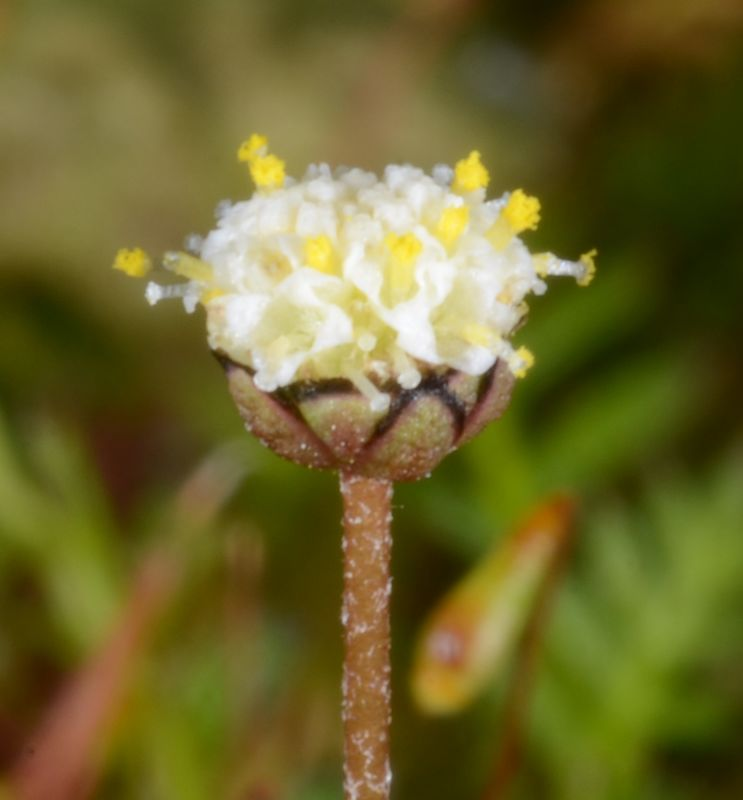
L. filiformis inflorescence

A creeping perennial, L. filiformis forms a low mat, spreading indefinitely via thin rhizomes on the soil surface. It has small green or brown feathery leaves, up to 2 cm (0.8 in) long. Its flowers are small (2–3 mm (0.08–0.12 in)) white button-shaped inflorescences on thin stalks.

== Taxonomy ==
This species was collected by Julius von Haast in 1862 on the Canterbury Plains, "among grass", and sent to Joseph Dalton Hooker, who in 1864 named it Cotula filiformis. David Lloyd, when revising Cotula, initially retained this species, then later transferred it into Leptinella when that taxon was elevated to a genus.

The genus name Leptinella, from the Greek leptos or thin, refers to the plant's slender ovary; filiformis, from the Latin filum or thread, means thread-shaped.

== Distribution and habitat ==
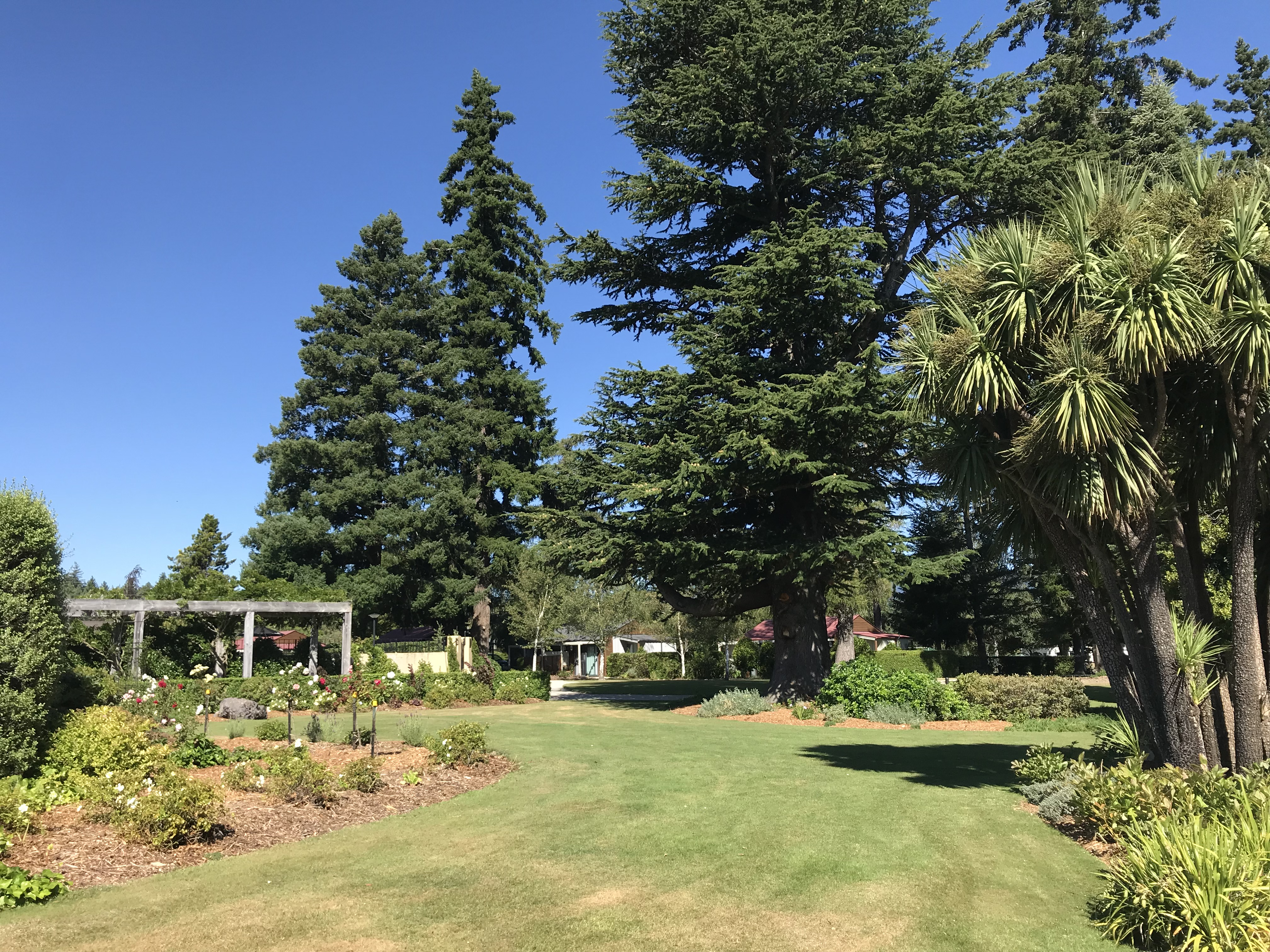
The hotel grounds where L. filiformis was rediscovered in 1998

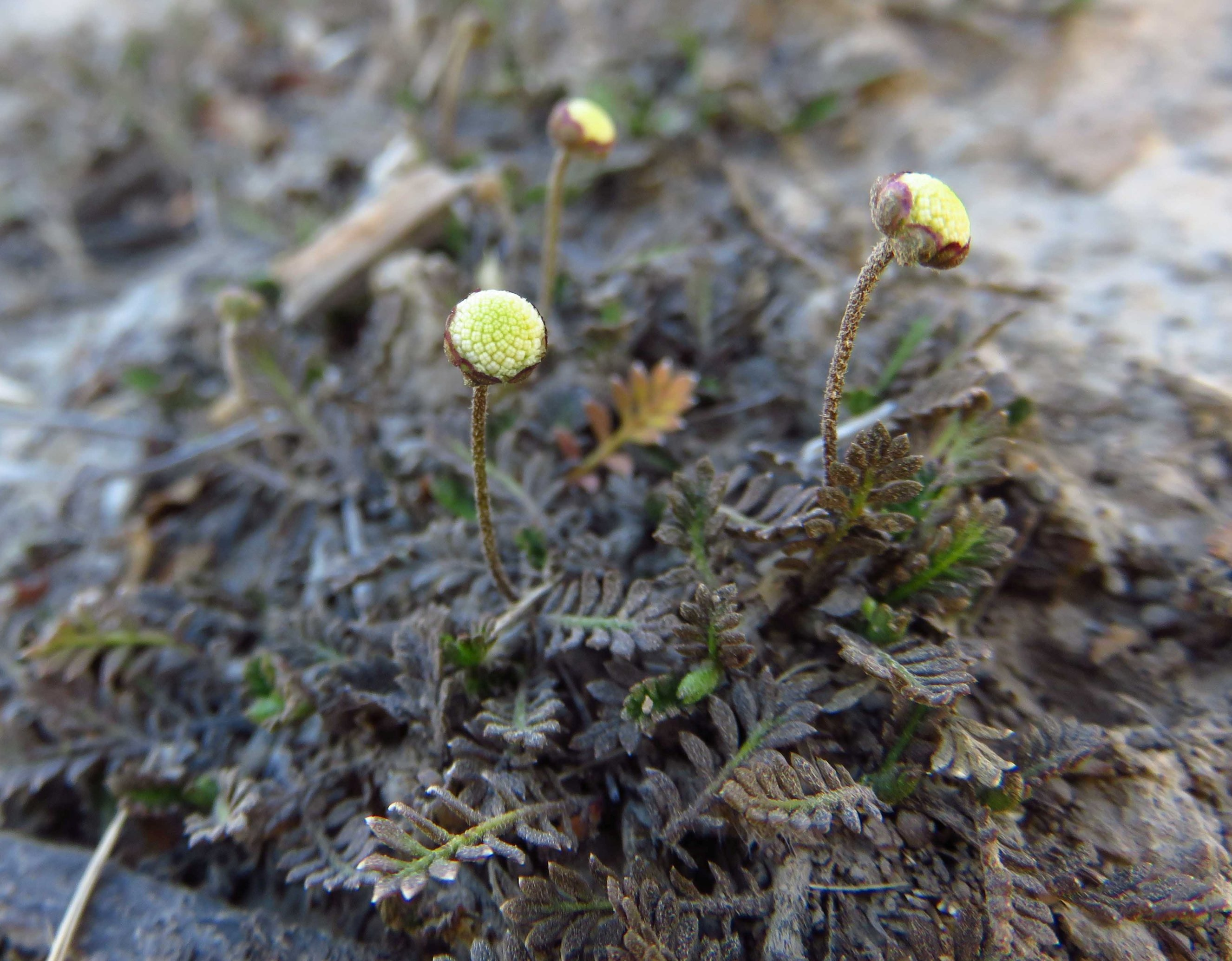
L. filiformis discovered growing in the Clarence River Valley in 2015

This species is known only from Marlborough and Canterbury in the northeast South Island. Although initially recorded from the Canterbury Plains, no further specimens were collected there. In 1919, Cockayne wrote:

Cotula filiformis until a year or two ago had been seen by no living New Zealand botanist, though it was known that Haast collected it on the Canterbury Plain. Thanks, however, to its rediscovery by Mr C.E. Christensen [in 1912], it has since proved to be fairly common on the Hanmer Plain.

L. filiformis had around the same time been found by Cockayne in the Awatere Valley, Marlborough. Subsequent collections were from these two areas: the plain in the Hanmer Valley, Canterbury (and one specimen from Culverden, 40 km (25 mi) away), and the Awatere Valley around Molesworth Station.

This species prefers open bare ground with little other vegetation. It grows in grassland and open shrub land on basins, plains, and dry alluvial river terraces up to 600 m (2,000 ft) above sea level. Field observations suggested it grew best in areas of bare ground created by excessive numbers of rabbits; when rabbits were removed, L. filiformis was swamped by returning vegetation.

== Conservation ==
The main conservation threats to this species are the conversion of open plains to farmland or plantation forests. It does not compete well with pasture grasses or exotic weeds like hawkweed (Pilosella spp.). In the 19th century L. filiformis was locally common, based on collection records in the literature. By the 1970s it was noted as rare and vulnerable, and in the 1980s it was no longer to be found in the wild, and was considered extinct.

In November 1998 botanist Brian Molloy discovered this species growing on the grounds of the then-vacant Hanmer Lodge hotel in Hanmer Springs. Almost pure patches of L. filiformis could be found on the lawn, under a canopy of ornamental exotic trees, mixed with introduced pasture grasses and weeds. Molloy noted this was the only site it had been seen in recent times: the last known specimens had been collected at the same place, in 1975.

In February 1999, Molloy and Department of Conservation (DOC) staff Peter de Lange and Nick Head returned to Hanmer Lodge and collected live plants for propagation. This was timely, because in late 1999 the hotel and grounds were redeveloped, which eradicated all L. filiformis on the site. The propagated plants were subsequently used in numerous plantings in cultivation and in reintroductions to the wild in protected sites.

In January 2015, a wild population of L. filiformis was discovered growing in the Waiau Toa / Clarence River Valley on Molesworth Station. DOC ranger Jan Clayton-Green had previously encountered the species in 2011 in the Clarence Valley without recognising it as L. filiformis; subsequently-collected plants were grown on until they flowered and their identity could be confirmed.
