= Leptinella filicula =

Scientific classification
- Kingdom: Plantae
- Clade: Embryophytes
- Clade: Tracheophytes
- Clade: Angiosperms
- Clade: Eudicots
- Clade: Asterids
- Order: Asterales
- Family: Asteraceae
- Genus: Leptinella
- Species: L. filicula

Binomial name
- Leptinella filicula (Hook.f.) Hook.f

Species of flowering plant

Leptinella filicula, (previously Cotula filicula) also known as ferny buttons or mountain Cotula, is a perennial herb frequently found in wet shaded areas, on mountains and in rainforests across South-Eastern Australia and Tasmania. L. filicula is an angiosperm (flowering plant), in the family Asteraceae, the largest vascular plant family in Australia.

== Description ==
L. filicula is stoloniferous with prostrate branches, growing to 10–75 cm (3.9–29.5 in) wide. Branches commonly have leaves along the full length and are often densely hairy along the stem. Leaves are pinnate, glossy and 20–50 mm (0.79–1.97 in) long. Leaves are oblong to ovate, sometimes with a secondary tooth or becoming bipinnate. Leaves sometimes with mucronate apices and tiny glandular dots. Leaves have slender petioles approximately 10 mm (0.39 in) long, however sometimes pinnate leaves run the length of the leaf and appear stem-clasping

Inflorescences, appearing button-like, are terminal, single, compact flowers that have yellow heads 6–9 mm (0.24–0.35 in) in diameter. Peduncles (flower stalks) are thick and 10-20mm long when in flower and grows closer to 60mm when in fruit. Involucral (surrounding) bracts are oblong or broadly ovate in shape with a blunt tip. The bracts have hyaline margins and are somewhat hairy. Florets are sessile (directly attached without stalks), with outer florets arranged in 3 or 4 rows. The corolla is minute and glandular.

Leptinella filicula fruit is a rounded cypsela, which is an achene common amongst the Asteraceae family. It is 1.5-2mm long, flattened laterally, a narrow wing connected to the seed and the corolla remains attached

Leptinella filicula flowers predominantly in summer.

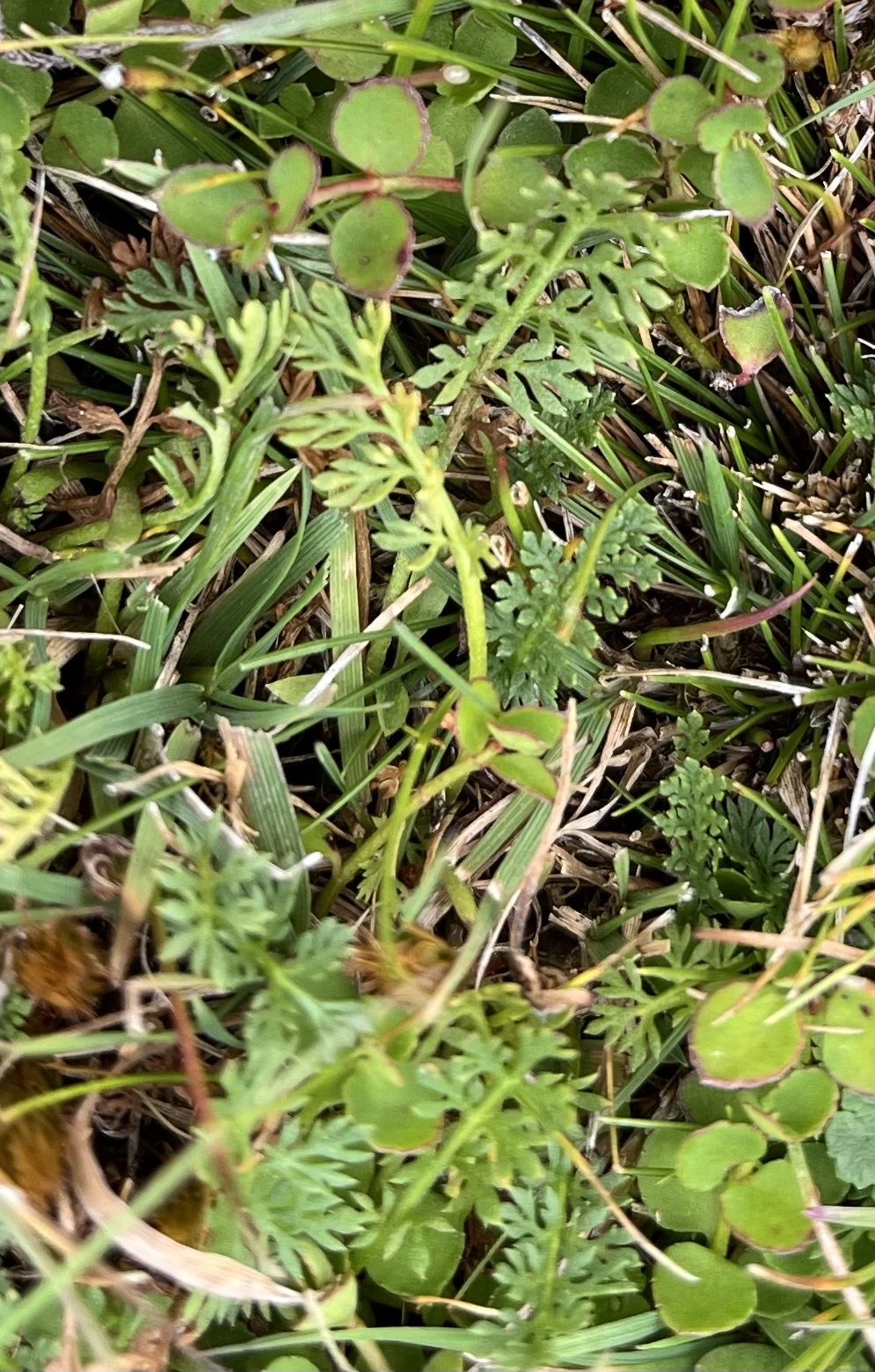
Leptinella filicula, found in the Central Plateau of Tasmania, in a Highland Poa Grassland community. Pictured here with Gonocarpus micranthus.

== Distinguishing characteristics ==
Leptinella filicula has peduncles that are thick and shorter than the leaves when in flower, however when in fruit the peduncle becomes longer than the leaves. L. filicula is typically covered by dense hairs.

== Conservation status ==
Not considered threatened at an international level.

== Taxonomy and phylogeny ==
Leptinella filicula was first described by Joseph Dalton Hooker (Hook.f) in 1856 as Cotula filicula.

The genus Leptinella belongs to the sub-tribe Cotulinae within the Anthemideae tribe of the Asteraceae family. Asteraceae is one of the largest angiosperm families, representing 10% of all flowering plants. It is phenotypically diverse and distributed widely across the globe. Asteraceae contains 16 sub-families and 51 tribes, including the tribe Anthemideae. Anthemideae is typically composed of herbs and shrubs with deeply divided leaves are aromatic and lack pappus bristles. The Old-World tribe contains 115 genera. and is often values for its pharmaceutical properties, as flavouring or spice, or to provide scents Species in the sub-tribe Cotulinae typically have plesiomorphic surface coverings (typically hairs or scales) affixed from the base. They have inflorescences that are solitary or clustered in groups, in the form of radiate, disciform, or discoid. The corolla typically have 3-4 lobes and anthers have a distinct slender-collar with non-polarized tissue. Within the sub-tribe Cotulinae, the genera Cotula, Solvia and Leptinella are closely related. Leptinella and Cotula diverged during the mid-Miocene, and yet have widespread distribution, indicating multiple dispersal events. Leptinella can be found in Australia, New Zealand, New Guinea, South America and the Falkland Islands. Within the Leptinella genus, L. filicula, is considered part of the filicula-group, and shares the trait of monoecious sex type that is common to other Leptinella groups that follow early diverging lineages.

== Distribution and habitat ==
Leptinella filicula is distributed across South-Eastern Australia and Tasmania, and occurs mainly in moist and shady environments. This includes wet Eucalypt forest, as well as montane vegetation, cool temperate rainforest and sub-alpine grasslands and herbfields.

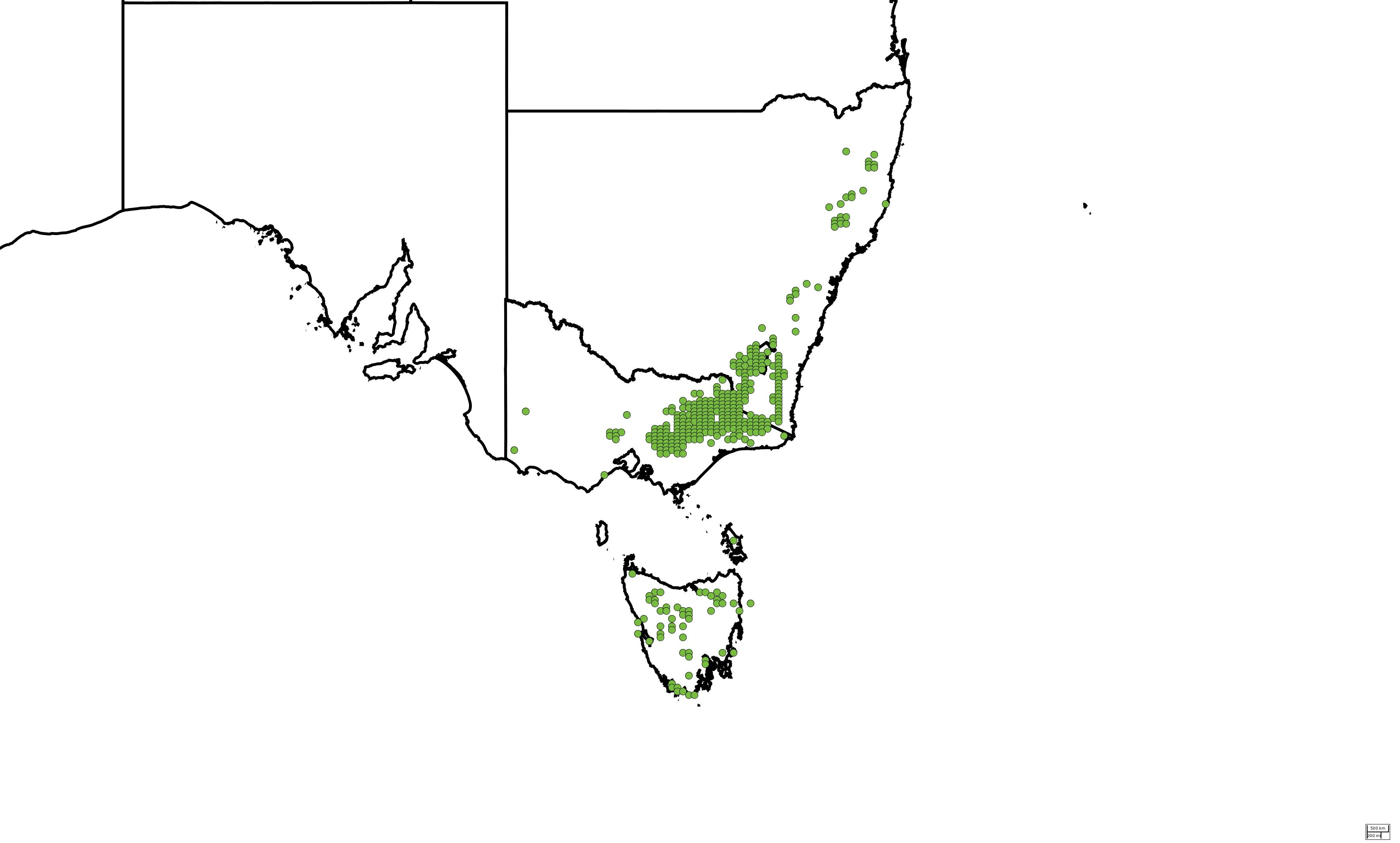
Leptinella filicula distribution map supplied by the Atlas of Living Australia, Leaflet, Open Street Map, Carto DB

== Nomenclature ==
Leptinella derives from the Greek work 'leptos', meaning slender and delicate. Filicula derives from the word filiculoides meaning 'is similar to a small fern'.

== Ecology ==
The presence of L. filicula is diagnostic of the short turf snowpatch grassland vegetation community, Poa costiniana and Poa hiemata grassland, Pultenaea muelleri open heathland and Phebalium squamulosum – Bossiaea foliosa closed heathland. In these highland grasslands and open heaths L. filicula contributes to a carpet of low-stature herbs. In each of these vegetation communities L. filicula contributes to the diversity of sub-alpine herbfields. L. filicula has been identified to contribute to the diet of grazing animals, namely invasive Sambar deer (Rusa unicolor) in South-Eastern Australia.

== Threats ==
While not recognised as a threatened species, shallow soils and risk of soil erosion pose a risk to the abundance of L. filicula. The impact of warming temperatures and reduced precipitation and the subsequent drying of soils may reduce the range of habitat suitable for L. filicula or alter the species' phenology.

== Use and cultivation ==
Used as a native groundcover in gardens in moist sites with some tolerance for sun and frost. Not often commercially available. Propagation possible from seed, cutting or division.
