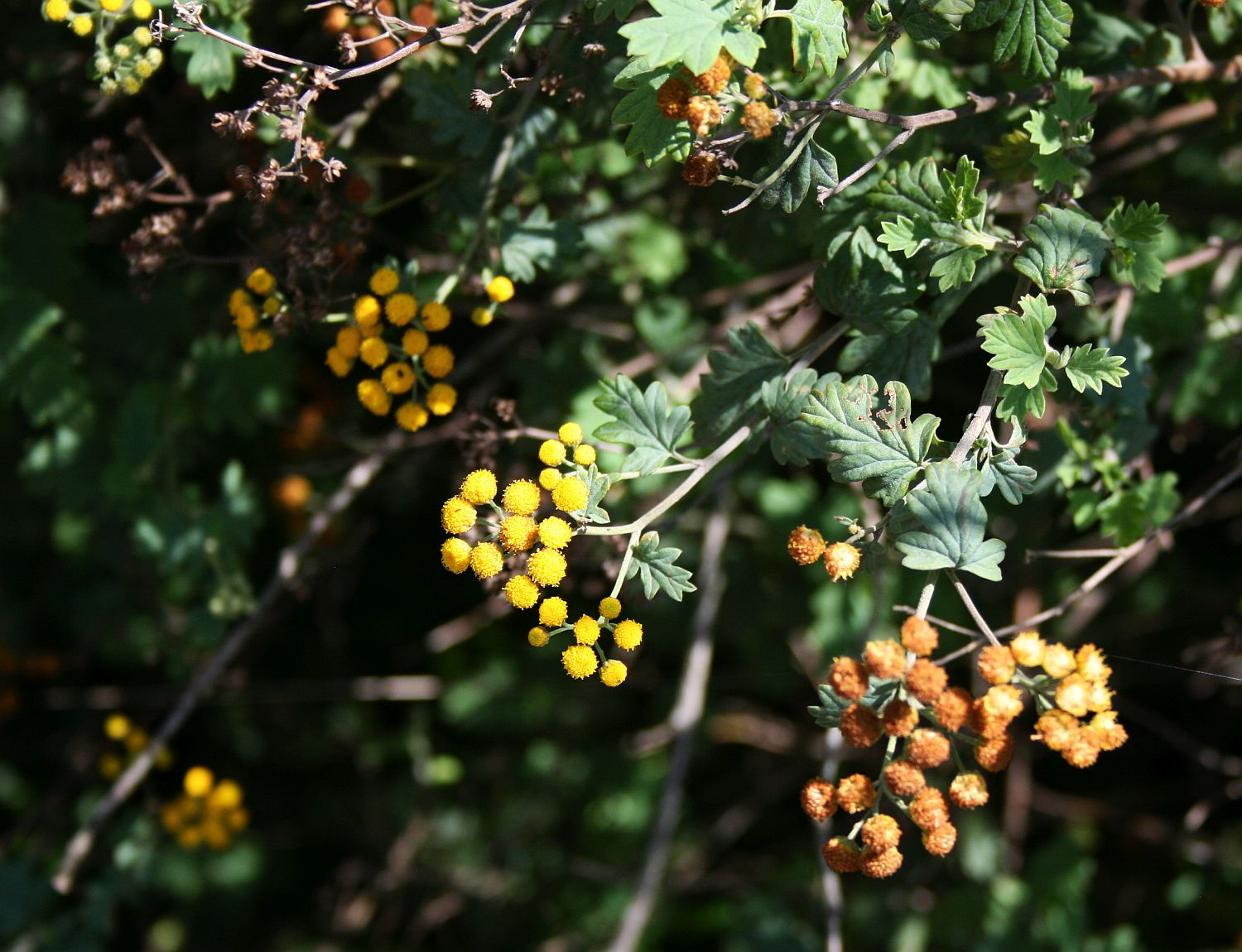
- Schistostephium rotundifolium

Scientific classification
- Kingdom: Plantae
- Clade: Tracheophytes
- Clade: Angiosperms
- Clade: Eudicots
- Clade: Asterids
- Order: Asterales
- Family: Asteraceae
- Subfamily: Asteroideae
- Tribe: Anthemideae
- Genus: Schistostephium; Less.

Type species
- Schistostephium flabelliforme Less.

Synonyms
- Osmitiphyllum Sch.Bip.; Peyrousea DC.

= Schistostephium =

Genus of flowering plants

Schistostephium is a genus of African plants in the chamomile tribe within the daisy family.

Species include:

- Schistostephium artemisiifolium
- Schistostephium crataegifolium
- Schistostephium dactyliferum
- Schistostephium flabelliforme
- Schistostephium griseum
- Schistostephium heptalobum
- Schistostephium hippiifolium
- Schistostephium mollissimum
- Schistostephium oxylobum
- Schistostephium rogersii
- Schistostephium rotundifolium
- Schistostephium scandens
- Schistostephium umbellatum

Species formerly included are:

- Schistostephium radicale - Cotula radicalis (see Cotula)
