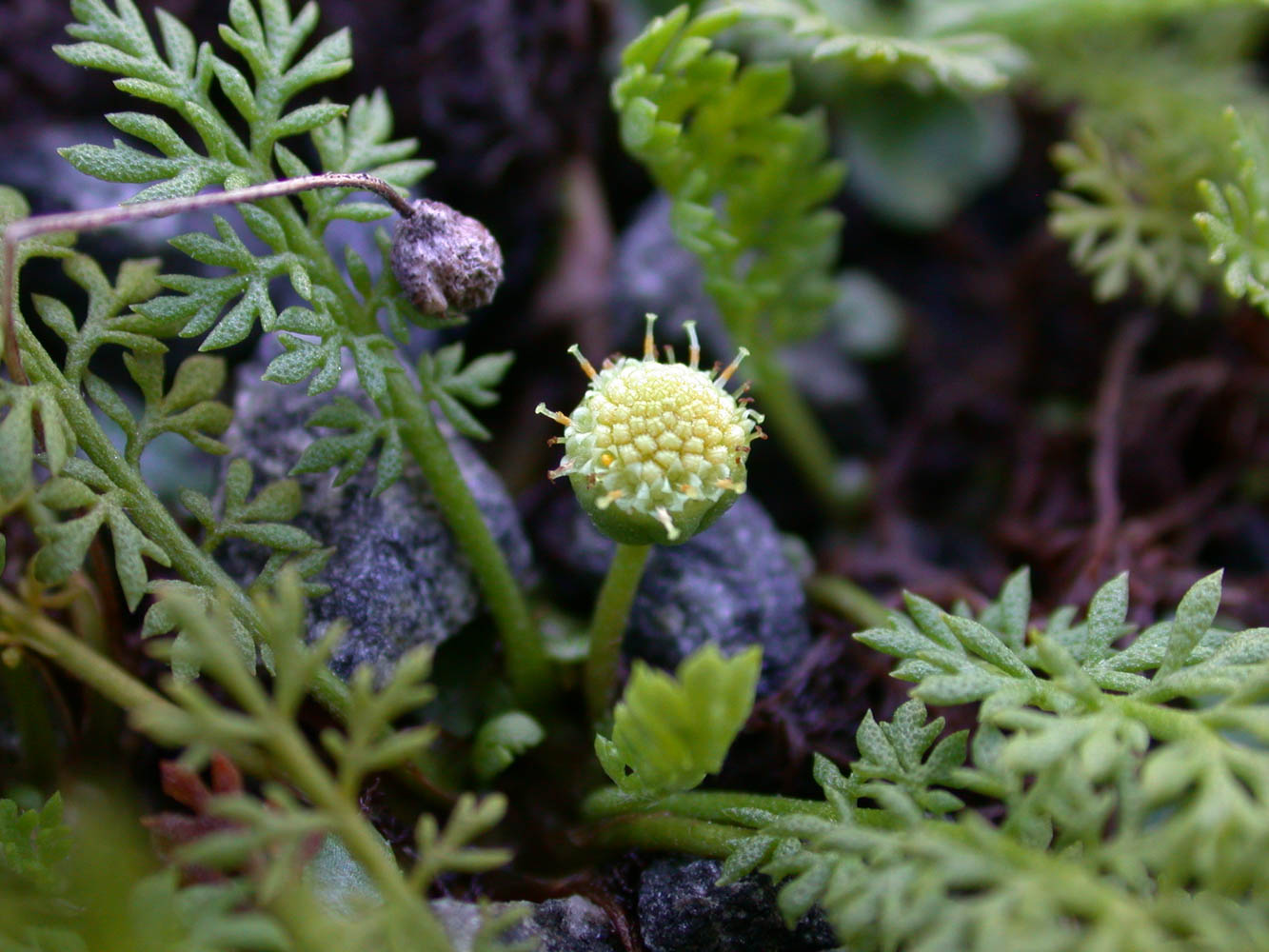

Scientific classification
- Kingdom: Plantae
- Clade: Tracheophytes
- Clade: Angiosperms
- Clade: Eudicots
- Clade: Asterids
- Order: Asterales
- Family: Asteraceae
- Genus: Cotula
- Species: C. alpina

Binomial name
- Cotula alpina Hemsl.

= Cotula alpina =

Species of flowering plant

Cotula alpina, also known as the alpine cotula, is a perennial herb in the family Asteraceae. It is a small flowering plant that forms ground covering mats and is well adapted to alpine environments.

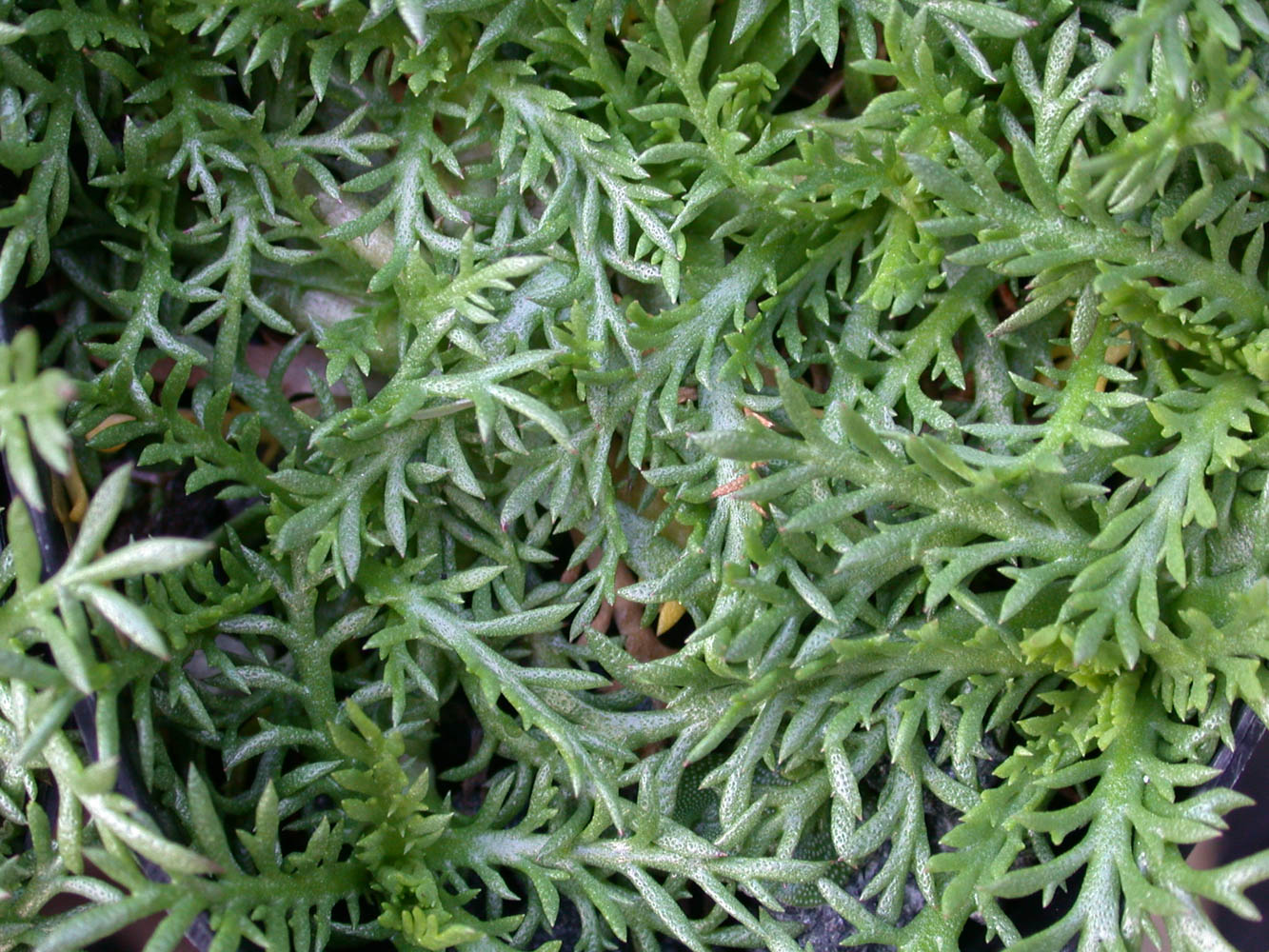
Cotula alpina matted foliage

== Description ==
Alpine cotula has flat glabrous light-green leaves that are pinnately divided almost to the midrib. It forms a large number of rosettes which lie just above ground level while the leaves are hairless and between 1–3 cm in length and 5–10 mm wide. They are slow growing plants and are often stoloniferous. It can be easily confused with Leptinella filicula which has similar looking leaves and is also part of the family Asteraceae. Flowering occurs from spring through to summer. Each rosette produces a single yellow/cream flower, about 7 mm in diameter. They are at the top of erect stalks that are generally shorter than the leaves but extend further when fruiting. A unique characteristic of C. alpina is that the flower-bearing stalks are hollow.

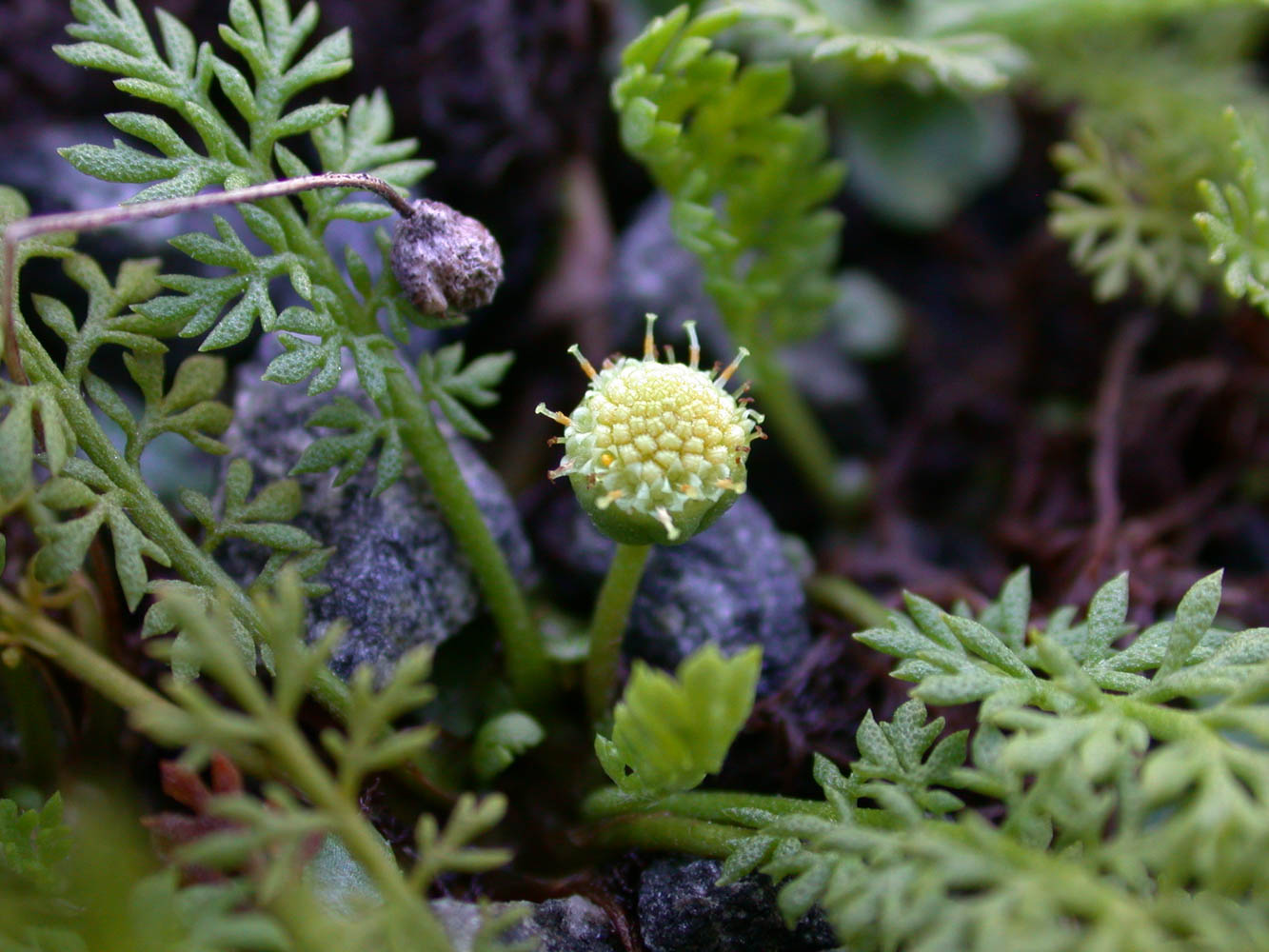
Cotula alpina foliage including fruiting stalk with achenes.

== Distribution and habitat ==
Cotula alpina is found in heath, short herbfield and tussock grasslands in alpine and sub-alpine areas. It is common in the Central Plateau and Midlands of Tasmania and can also be found at high altitudes in Victoria and New South Wales. The herb can survive in shade to full sun and requires high moisture levels for growth. It can also tolerate clay, loam and sandy soil types and is phosphorus intolerant. It can survive through exposed environmental conditions including high winds and low temperatures including snow and frosts. It has been reported to show grazing resistance.

== Seed and germination ==
Cotula aplina has achenes, which are hard, dry fruit which contain a single seed. As the seed matures, the achenes loosen towards the top and develops a fluffy appearance. The seeds are 1.5–2 mm long, compressed laterally and germination can occur after 2 to 4 weeks.
