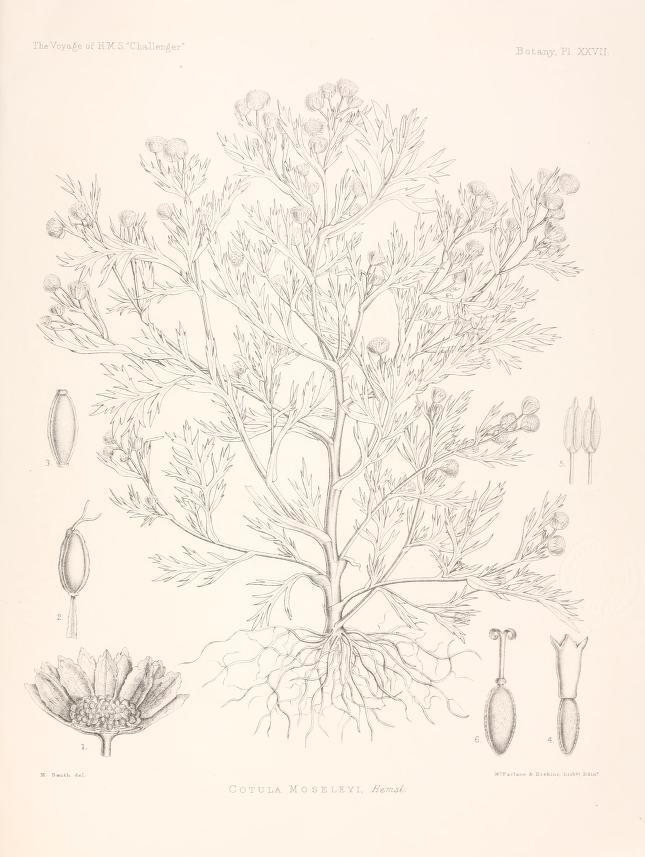
- Drawing of Nightingale brassbuttons (Cotula moseleyi)

Conservation status
- Vulnerable (IUCN 3.1)

Scientific classification
- Kingdom: Plantae
- Clade: Tracheophytes
- Clade: Angiosperms
- Clade: Eudicots
- Clade: Asterids
- Order: Asterales
- Family: Asteraceae
- Genus: Cotula
- Species: C. moseleyi

Binomial name
- Cotula moseleyi Hemsl.

= Cotula moseleyi =

Species of flowering plant

Cotula moseleyi, also known as Nightingale brassbuttons, is a species of flowering plant in the sunflower family. It has been found only in the Tristan da Cunha chain of islands in the South Atlantic Ocean. Its natural habitats are subantarctic forests, subantarctic grassland, rocky shores, and hillsides. It is threatened by habitat loss.
