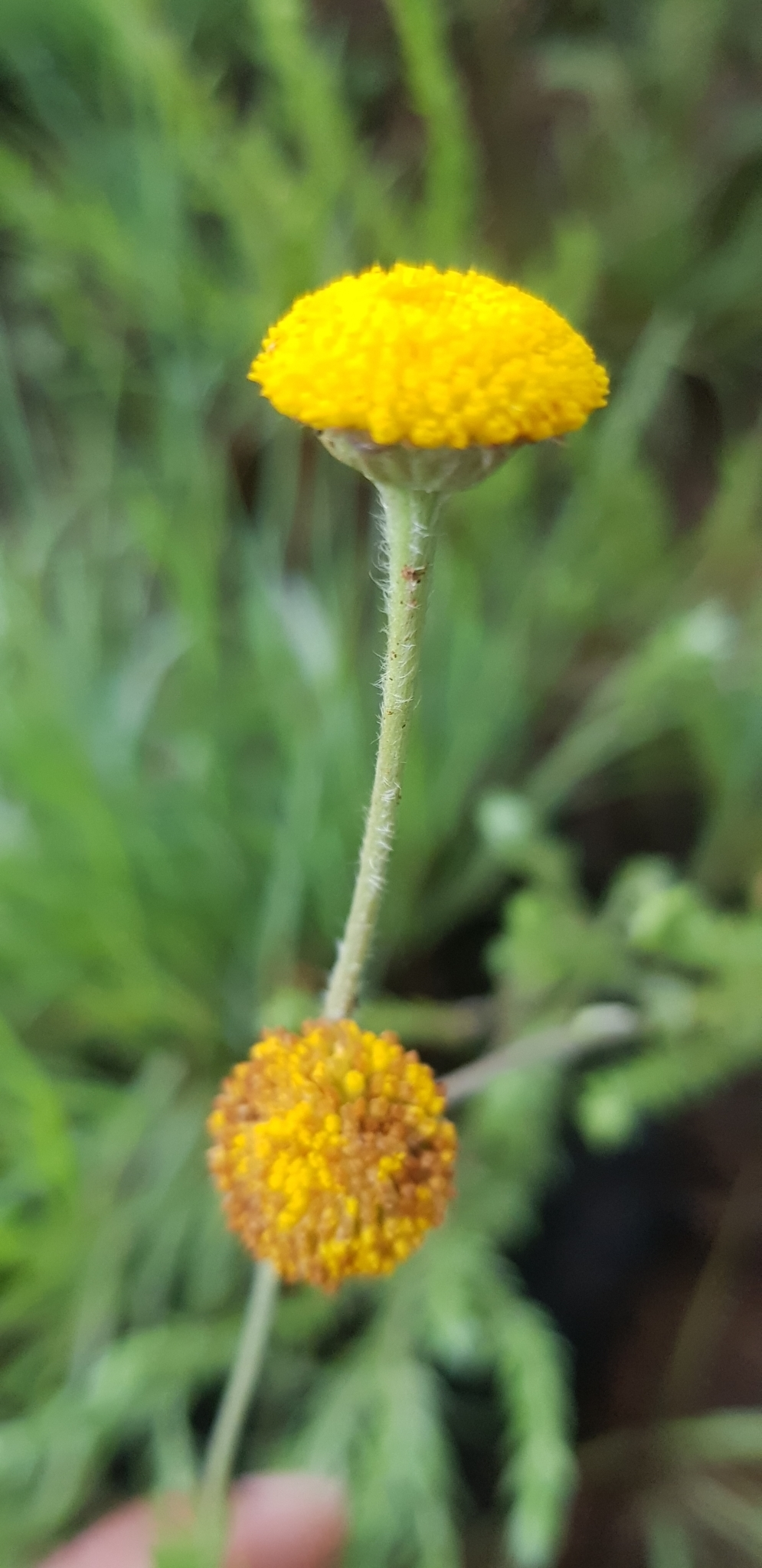

Scientific classification
- Kingdom: Plantae
- Clade: Tracheophytes
- Clade: Angiosperms
- Clade: Eudicots
- Clade: Asterids
- Order: Asterales
- Family: Asteraceae
- Genus: Schistostephium
- Species: S. griseum

Binomial name
- Schistostephium griseum (Harv.) Hutch.

Synonyms
- Tanacetum griseum Harv.

= Schistostephium griseum =

Southern African plant species

Schistostephium griseum is a species of plant from southern Africa.

== Description ==
=== Growth form ===
Schistostephium griseum is a perennial woody herb or shrub that grows up to 75 cm (30 in) tall. It is covered in silky white hairs. The branches have a diameter of 1.5–5 mm (0.059–0.197 in).

=== Leaves ===
The leaves are alternately arranged. They are most common on young branches, but some also grow on the main branch. They are pinnately with three to seven linear lobes and an entire margin. The margins are often thickened and roll inswards. They sometime grow directly on the branches and sometimes have a midrib that lacks lamina at the base. When present, the laminas are more or less oval shaped and pinnately dissected. While the laminas have glands, these are often hidden by hairs. These hairs are the most dense along the midrib and veins. They are about 1 mm (0.039 in) long.

=== Flowers ===
Bright yellow flowers are present in December. They are disc-shaped and borne on long (10–20 cm (3.9–7.9 in)) brown-haired stalks. Hairy bracts subtending the flowerhead are sometimes present. All the flowers are hermaphroditic.

The involucre is broad (13–17 mm (0.51–0.67 in) and shallowly bell-shaped. It is made of about 45 bracts. They are variable in shape and size and are often translucent towards the tips. They are densely hairy below. The hairs are pale when they dry.

The receptacle (the central part of the flower that holds the pollen) is hollow and domed. The anthers have inconspicuous collars and turn white when they dry. The lobes are slightly rounded due to a dense layer of hairs.

=== Fruits ===
The fruits are achenes (dry and single seeded fruits) sparsely covered with glands. They are 2–2.5 mm (0.079–0.098 in) long. Hairs are sparse, or more commonly absent. There is no pappus.

== Distribution and habitat ==
This plant is endemic to South Africa, Eswatini, Lesotho and Mozambique. It grows in stony grassland at altitude of 250–1,300 m (820–4,270 ft). It is also found at the edges of forests.

== Conservation ==
This species is considered to be of least concern by the South African National Biodiversity Institute. While it is declining in parts of its range due to habitat loss and degradation, it has a large enough range to not yet be at risk of extinction.
