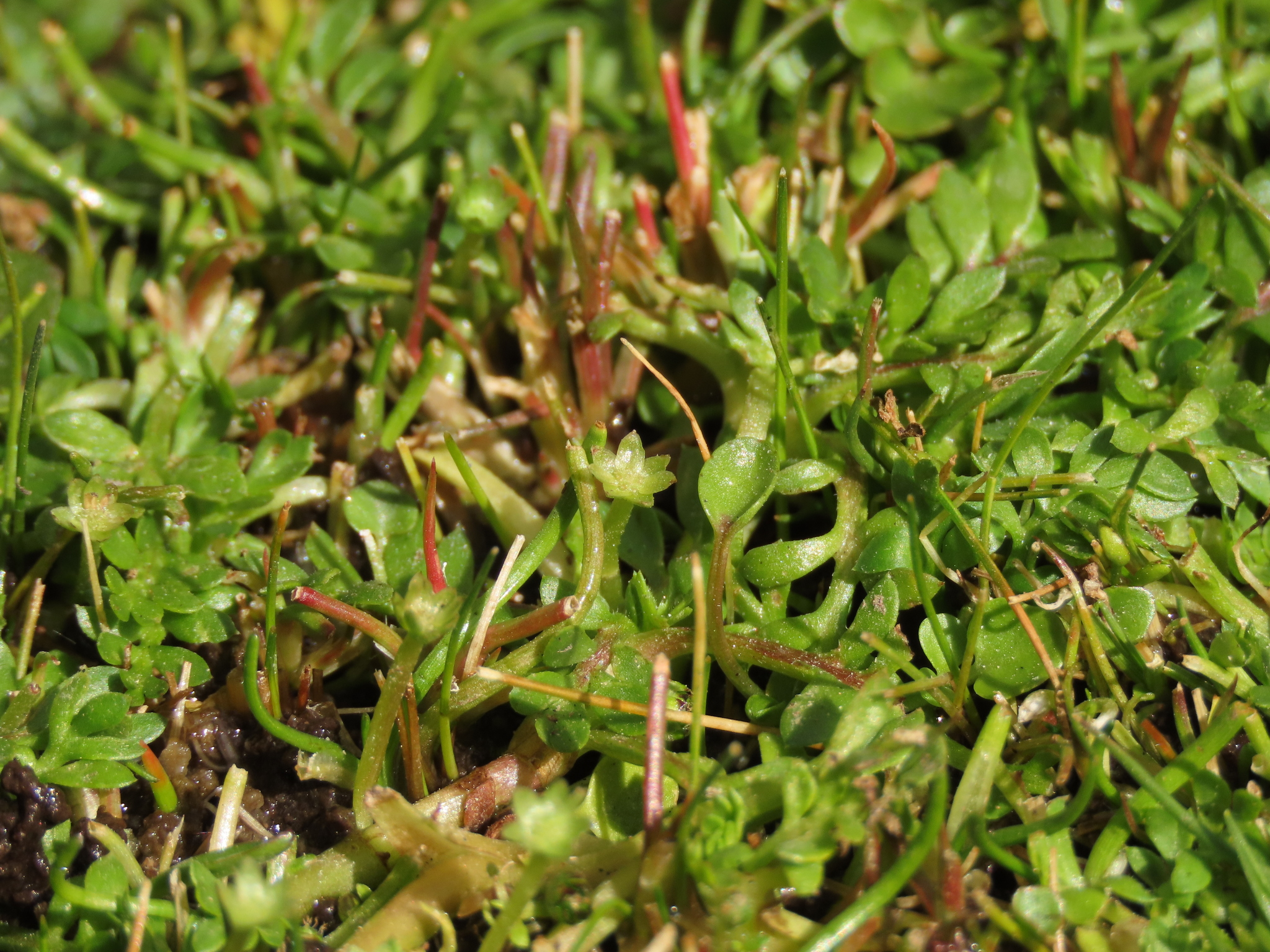

Scientific classification
- Kingdom: Plantae
- Clade: Tracheophytes
- Clade: Angiosperms
- Clade: Eudicots
- Clade: Asterids
- Order: Asterales
- Family: Asteraceae
- Genus: Cotula
- Species: C. mexicana

Binomial name
- Cotula mexicana Hemsl.

Synonyms
- Synonymy: Cotula cabrerae Caro; Cotula pygmaea (Kunth) Benth. & Hook.f. ex Hemsl.; Cotula valparadisea Phil.; Gymnostyles minuta (L.f.) Spreng.; Gymnostyles pedunculata Moc. ex DC.; Gymnostyles peruviana Spreng.; Hippia minuta L.f.; Lancisia minuta (L.f.) Rydb.; Soliva mexicana DC.; Soliva minuta (L.f.) Sweet; Soliva pedicellata Ruiz & Pav.; Soliva pedunculata Ruiz & Pav. ex Steud.; Soliva pygmaea Kunth

= Cotula mexicana =

Species of flowering plant

Cotula mexicana, also known as Mexican brassbuttons, is a plant species in the sunflower family. It is widespread in South America and also found in central Mexico (Puebla, México State, Hidalgo) and parts of the United States (California, Idaho).
