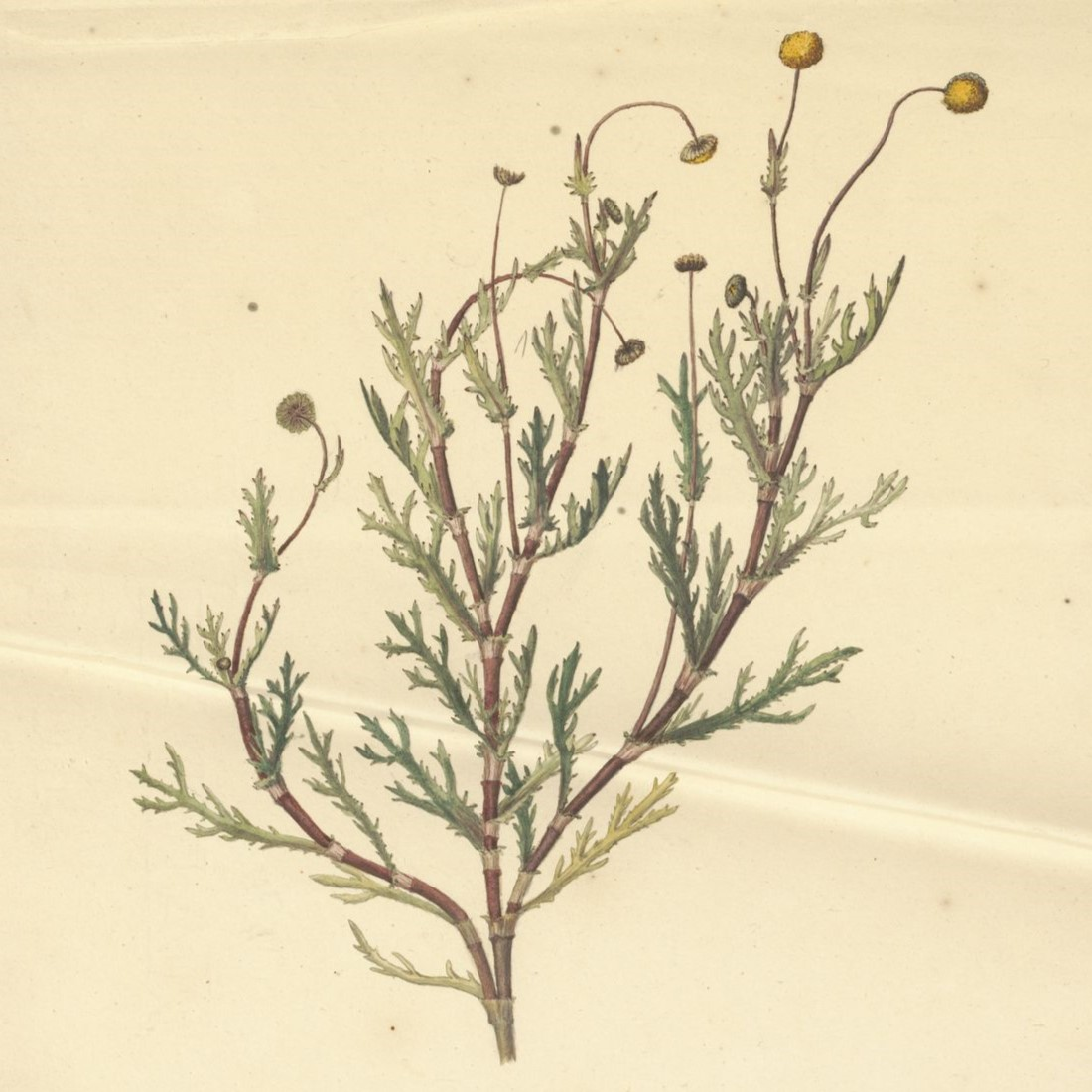

Scientific classification
- Kingdom: Plantae
- Clade: Tracheophytes
- Clade: Angiosperms
- Clade: Eudicots
- Clade: Asterids
- Order: Asterales
- Family: Asteraceae
- Genus: Cotula
- Species: C. anthemoides

Binomial name
- Cotula anthemoides L.

= Cotula anthemoides =

Plant species in the aster family

Cotula anthemoides is a species of flowering plant in the Aster family that is widely distributed across Africa and southern Asia. It has also been introduced to Albania, France, and Poland.

== Description ==
The species grows across the ground, with the ends of the branches sometimes growing upright. It lacks hairs and has several branches up to 20 centimeters long. The leaves have small stalks and are a stretched oval shape, around 2–4 cm long and 1.5–3 cm wide. The capitula are roughly globe-shaped and yellow, with a diameter of 4–6 mm. Each capitulum is solitary on its own thread with stalks 4–5 cm long. The whorl of bracts below the flowers is more or less saucer shaped. The outer florets make a very small corolla, while the disc-florets are twice as long. The fruits are oval shaped and around 1 mm long, with narrow wings and a pale-brown color. The plant flowers from March to June.

== Taxonomy ==
Cotula anthemoides was first formally described by Carl Linnaeus in 1753 in Species Plantarum. Linnaeus gave the following brief description for the species:

COTULA foliis pinnato-multifidis, corollis radio destitutis.
Cotula with cleftly-divided pinnate leaves, lacking ray-like petals.

=== Synonyms ===
The following synonyms are accepted according to Plants of the World Online:

	Name	Author	Year	Journal
Homotypic	Lancisia anthemoides	(L.) Moench	1802	Suppl. Meth.
Homotypic	Pleiogyne anthemoides	(L.) K.Koch	1843	Bot. Zeitung (Berlin)
Heterotypic	Artemisia nilotica	L.	1755	Cent. Pl. I
Heterotypic	Cenia microcephala	E.Mey. ex DC.	1838	Prodr.
Heterotypic	Cotula dichrocephala	Sch.Bip. ex A.Rich.	1848	Tent. Fl. Abyss.
Heterotypic	Cotula microcephala	DC.	1838	Prodr.
Heterotypic	Nananthea tassiliensis	Batt. & Trab.	1913	Bull. Soc. Bot. France
Heterotypic	Pleiogyne cardiospermum	Edgew.	1846	Trans. Linn. Soc. London
Heterotypic	Pleiogyne microcephala	K.Koch	1843	Bot. Zeitung (Berlin)

== Uses ==
The flower heads are used in traditional medicine to treat rheumatic pain. A poultice is created by crushing the flower parts into powder and then warming them with oil.
