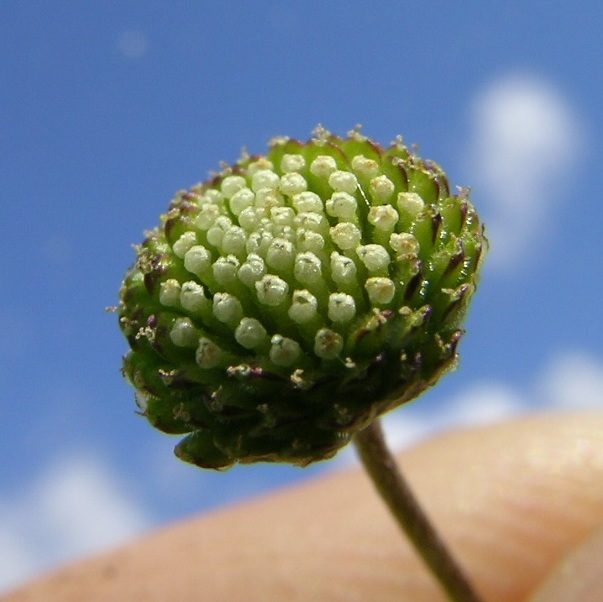

Scientific classification
- Kingdom: Plantae
- Clade: Tracheophytes
- Clade: Angiosperms
- Clade: Eudicots
- Clade: Asterids
- Order: Asterales
- Family: Asteraceae
- Genus: Cotula
- Species: C. australis

Binomial name
- Cotula australis (Sieber ex Spreng.) Hook.

Synonyms
- Anacyclus australis Sieber ex Spreng.; Cotula venosa Colenso; Lancisia australis (Sieber ex Spreng.) Rydb.; Soliva tenella A.Cunn.; Strongylosperma australe (Sieber ex Spreng.) Less.

= Cotula australis =

Species of flowering plant

Cotula australis is a species of plant in the daisy family known by the common names bachelor's buttons, annual buttonweed, southern waterbuttons and Australian waterbuttons. This small plant is native to Australia and New Zealand, but it is known in other areas of the world as a common weed (South America, California, Mexico, South Africa, etc.).

Cotula australis grows low to the ground in a thin mat with some slightly erect, spindly stems. The leaves are divided and subdivided into fringelike lobes. The plant flowers in inflorescences only a few millimetres wide containing minuscule yellow disc florets surrounded by greenish brown bracts and rudimentary ray florets that have been reduced to pistils with no stamens or corolla. The fruit is a tiny winged achene about a millimetre wide.
