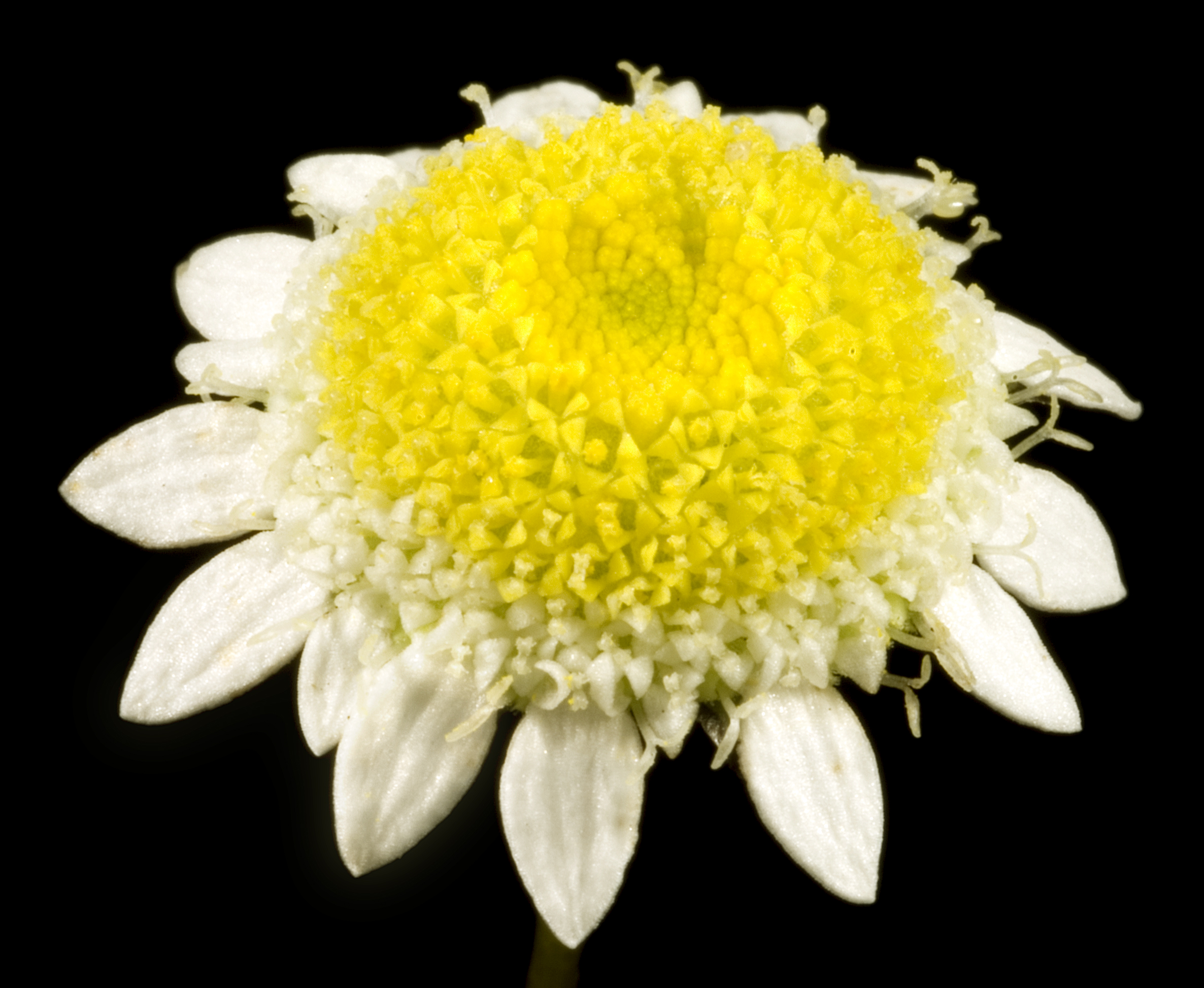

Scientific classification
- Kingdom: Plantae
- Clade: Tracheophytes
- Clade: Angiosperms
- Clade: Eudicots
- Clade: Asterids
- Order: Asterales
- Family: Asteraceae
- Genus: Cotula
- Species: C. turbinata

Binomial name
- Cotula turbinata L.

Synonyms
- List: Cenia anthemoidea DC.; Cenia debilis DC.; Cenia subheterocarpa Less.; Cenia turbinata (L.) Pers.; Cotula pumila Houtt.; Lancisia turbinata Gaertn.; Lidbeckia pruinosa E.Mey. ex DC.; Lidbeckia turbinata Thunb.

= Cotula turbinata =

Species of flowering plant

Cotula turbinata (common name ganskos in South Africa, funnel weed in Western Australia) is a herb in the Asteraceae family native to the Cape Province, but found in India and in Australia

Cotula turbinata is an annual herb, growing to heights of 5 cm to 40 cm, and has hairy stems. In Western Australia, it grows on sandy soils, in lawns and on road verges, where its white and yellow flowers may be seen from July to October.

It was first described by Carl Linnaeus in 1753. The genus name, Cotula, comes from the Greek kotule meaning "small cup" and refers to the cupped area at the base of the leaves, while the specific epithet, turbinata, is a botanical Latin adjective, which describes the flower as having the shape of a top.

== Gallery ==
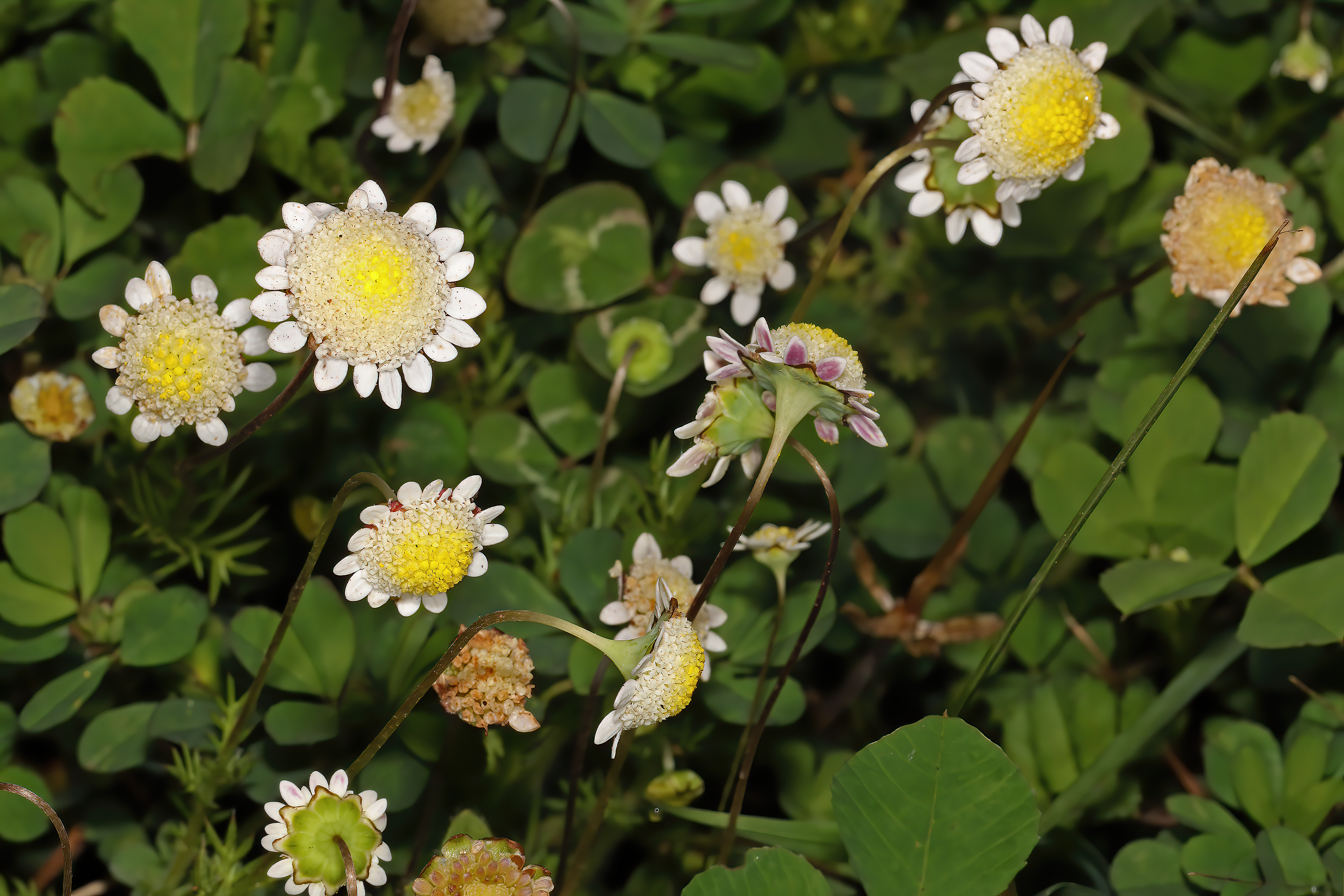

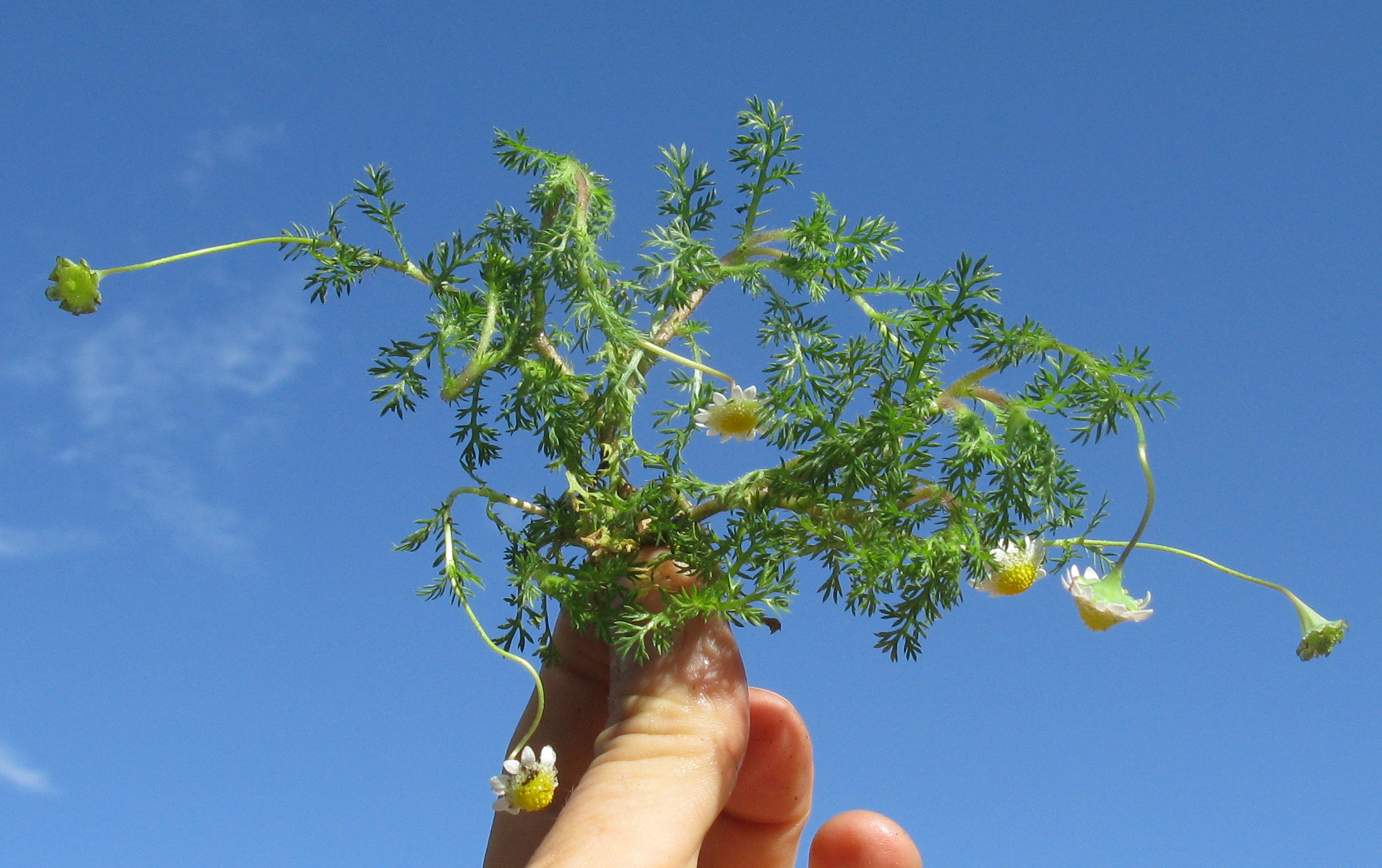

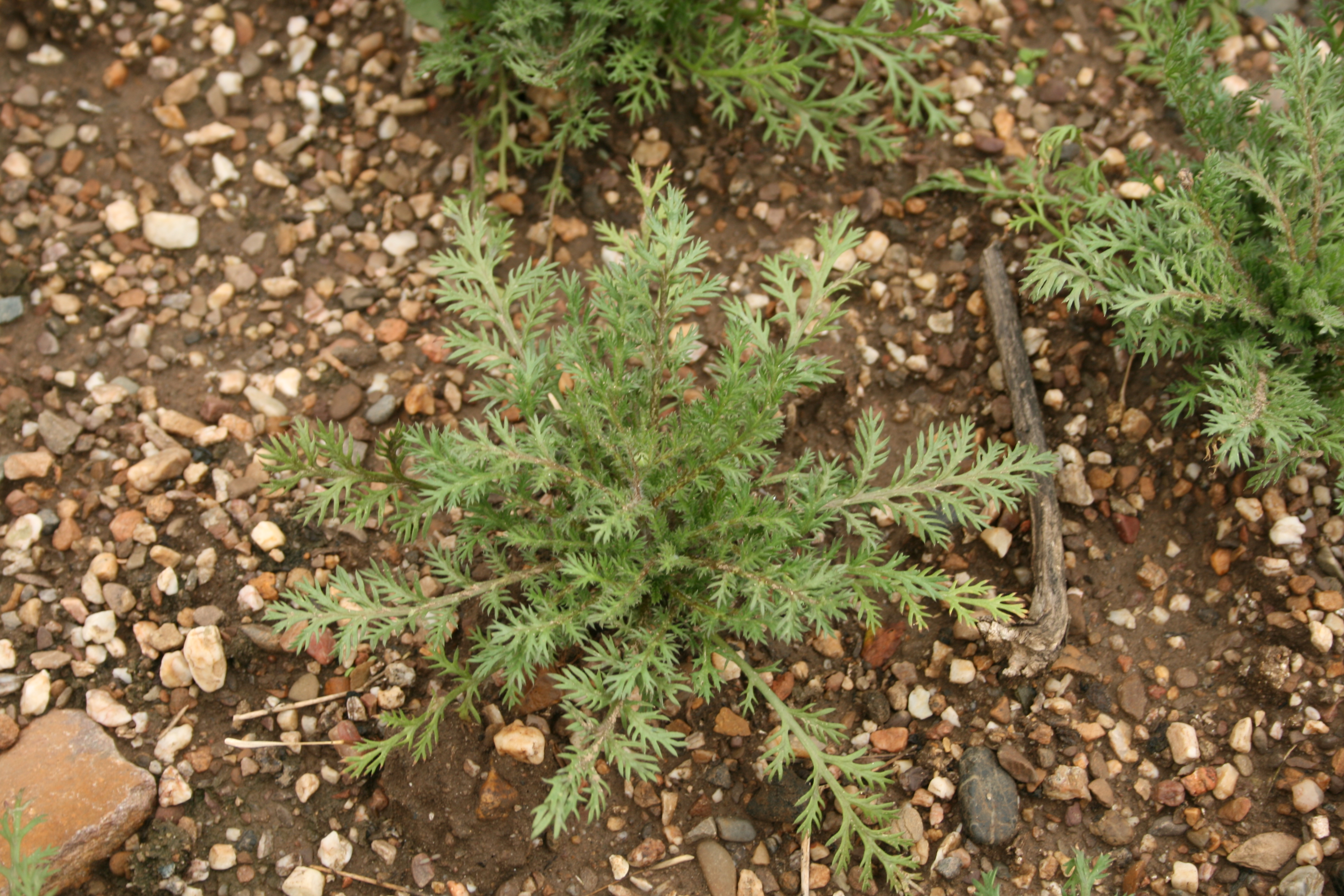
