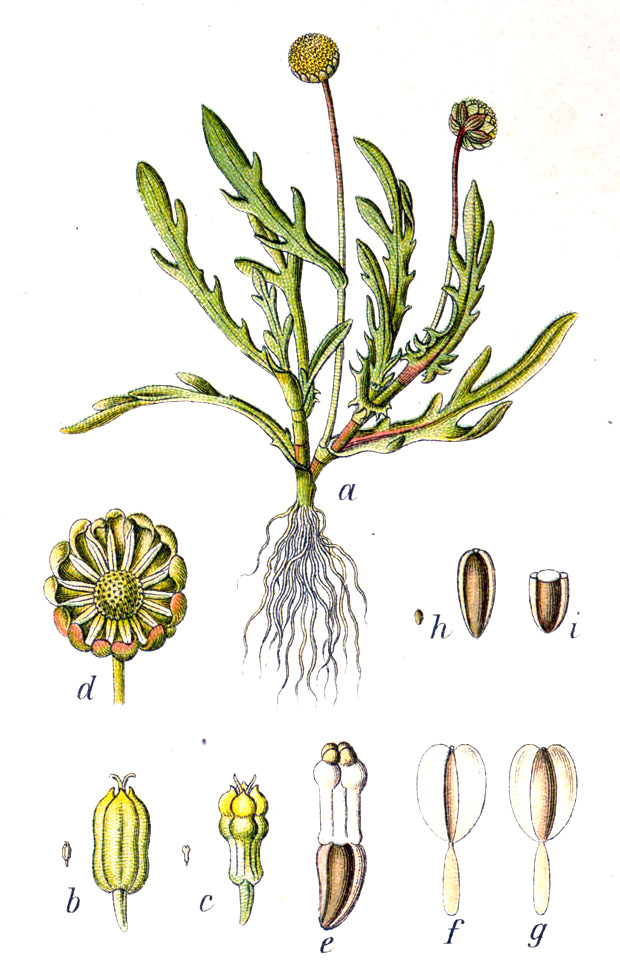
- 1796 illustration

Scientific classification
- Kingdom: Plantae
- Clade: Tracheophytes
- Clade: Angiosperms
- Clade: Eudicots
- Clade: Asterids
- Order: Asterales
- Family: Asteraceae
- Genus: Cotula
- Species: C. coronopifolia

Binomial name
- Cotula coronopifolia L.

Synonyms
- Cotula coronipifolia L.; Cotula integrifolia Burch.; Cotula montevidensis Spreng.; Lancisia coronopifolia (L.) Rydb.

= Cotula coronopifolia =

Species of flowering plant

Cotula coronopifolia is a species of flowering plant in the aster family (Asteraceae). Commonly known as brass buttons, golden buttons, and buttonweed, it is native to southern Africa.

== Description ==
The flower heads are bright yellow discoid heads that look like thick buttons. Individual plants spread stems along the ground and send up the knobby flowers at intervals. The plant is native to southern Africa, but it has been introduced to other parts of the world (Europe, North + South America, etc.).

Brass buttons are common plants that occupy a specialized ecological niche. They prefer muddy, anoxic wetlands and brackish water. They are very salt-tolerant. The plant has fat, fleshy leaves that store water during times of saline inundation. The reddish stems and green, blade-shaped leaves are coated with a shiny cuticle to retain moisture. It can also be found in the wetter patches in vernal pool ecosystems. Brass buttons are common along beaches, salt marshes, and estuaries from California to Washington. It has been present in the British Isles since the late 1800s, especially on the Cheshire coast and is considered a neophyte naturalised plant.

Although brass buttons is known to be invasive, its spread appears to be relatively slow. Its California Invasive Plant Council Inventory rating is "limited", that is, "invasive but their ecological impacts are minor on a statewide level or there was not enough information to justify a higher score. Their reproductive biology and other attributes result in low to moderate rates of invasiveness. Ecological amplitude and distribution are generally limited, but these species may be locally persistent and problematic."

== Gallery ==
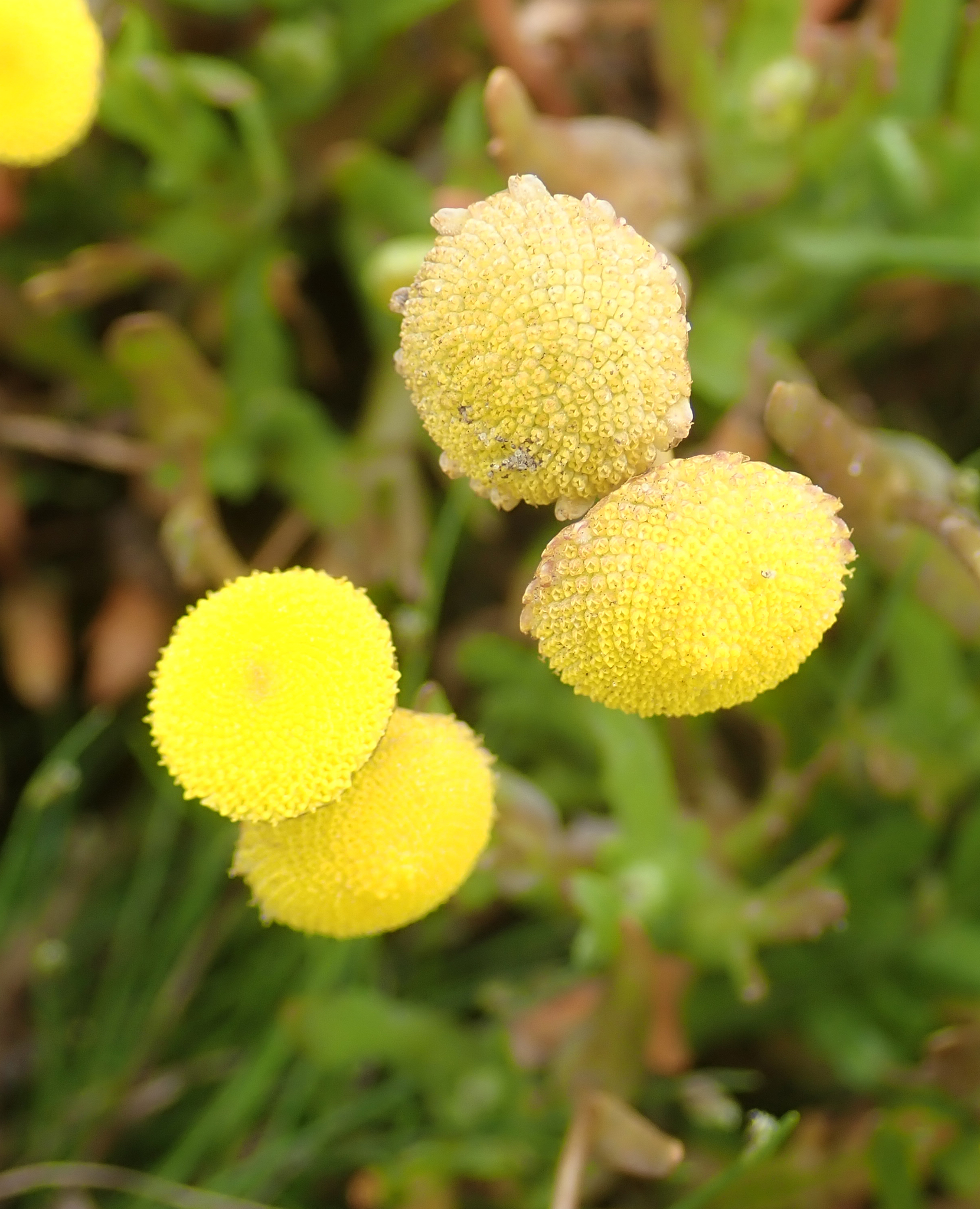

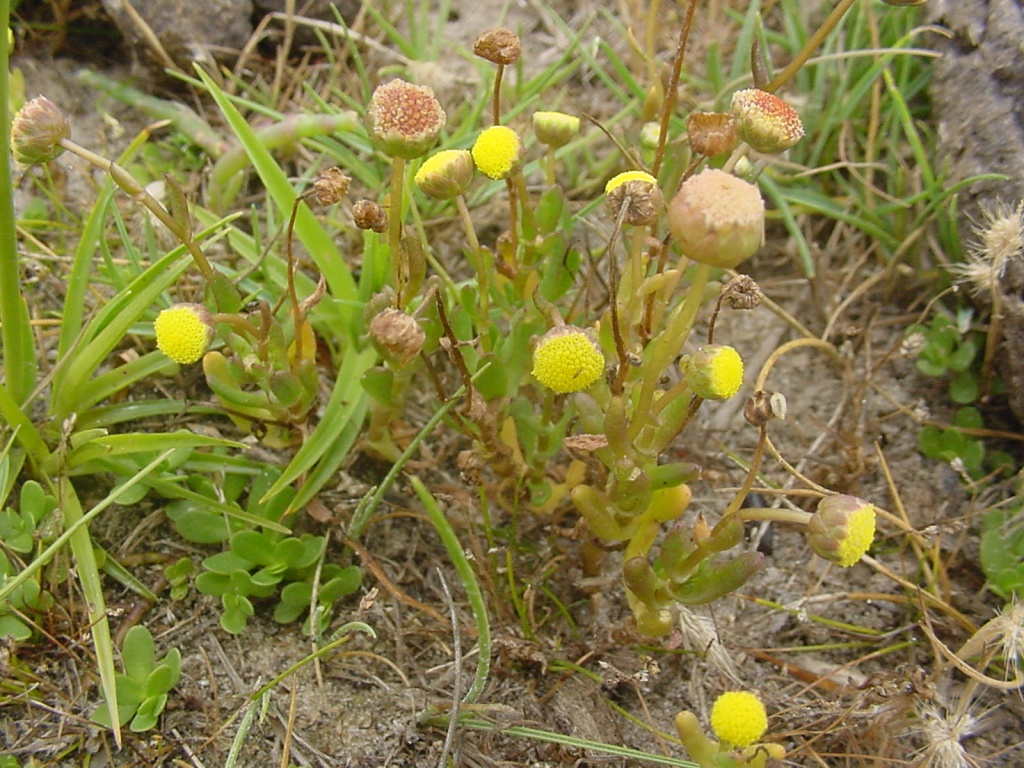

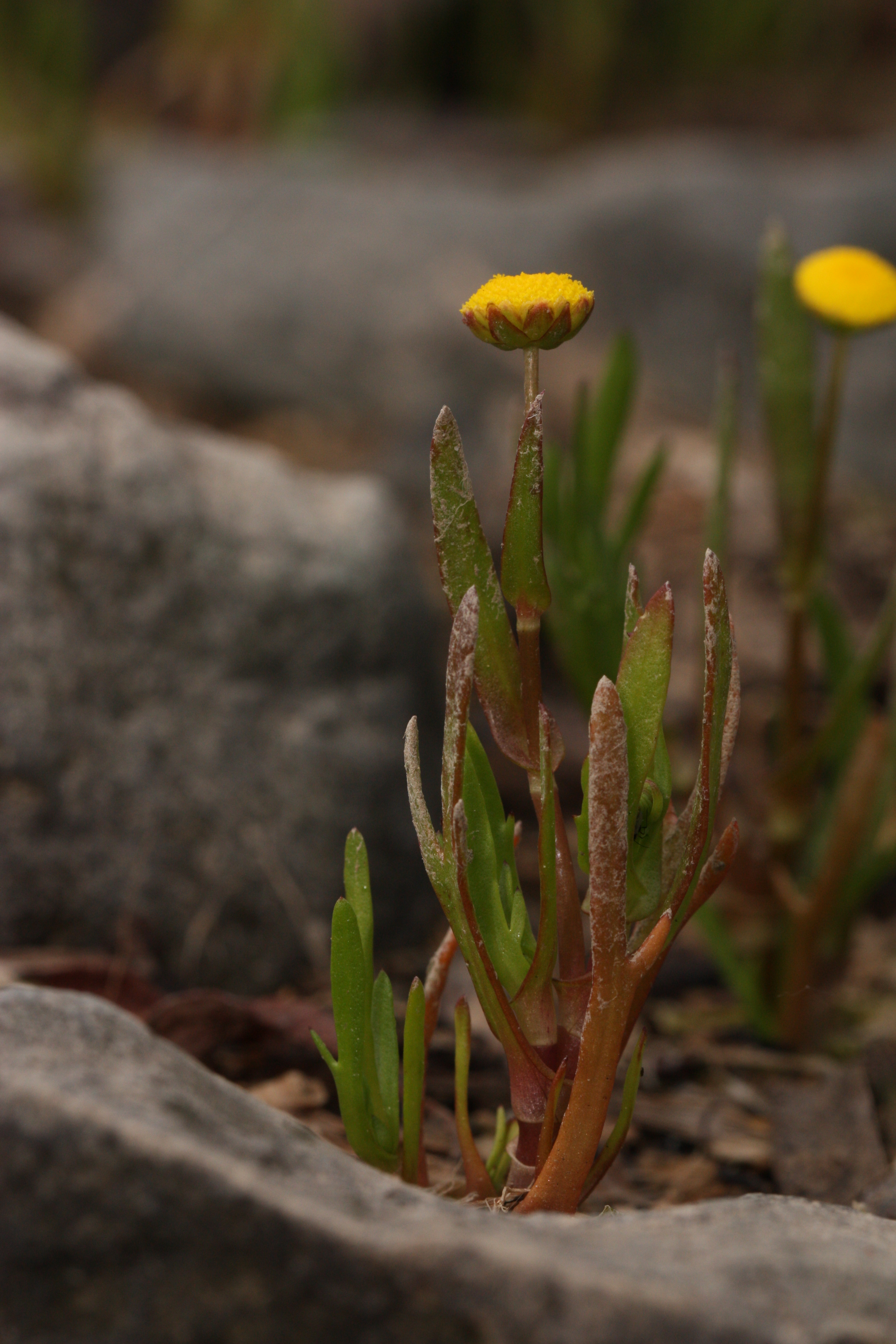
Leaves sheath the stem and are entire or with a few teeth or deep lobes (Fir Island, Washington)

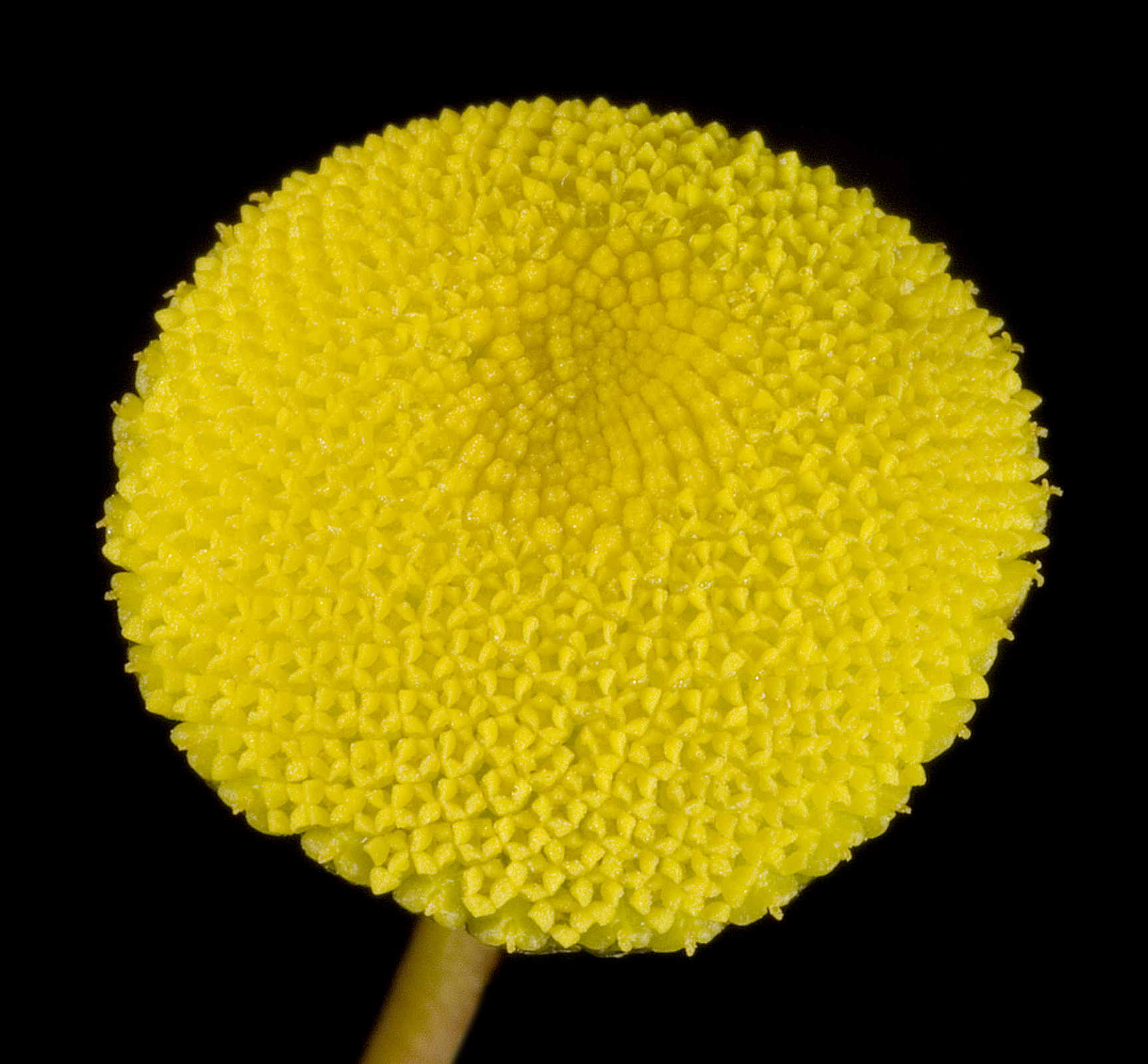
