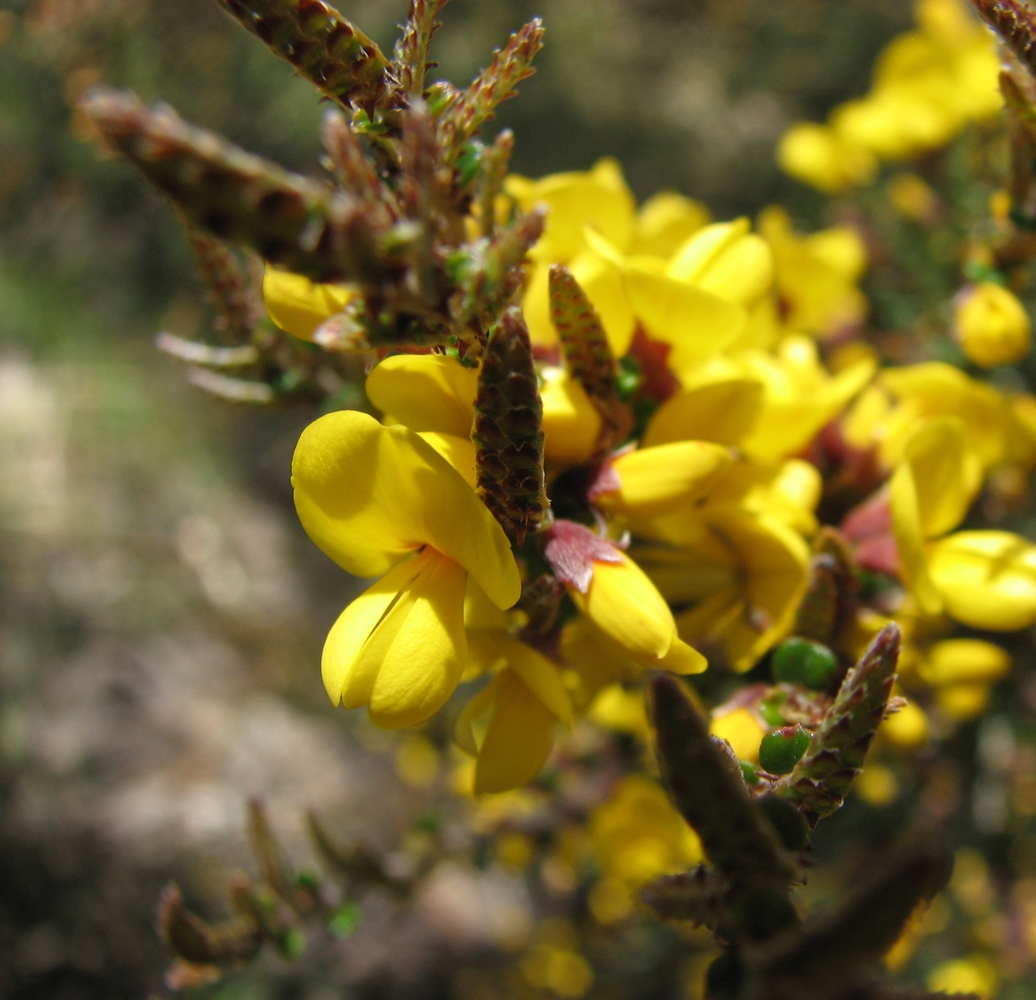
- In Mount Buffalo National Park

Scientific classification
- Kingdom: Plantae
- Clade: Tracheophytes
- Clade: Angiosperms
- Clade: Eudicots
- Clade: Rosids
- Order: Fabales
- Family: Fabaceae
- Subfamily: Faboideae
- Genus: Bossiaea
- Species: B. foliosa

Binomial name
- Bossiaea foliosa A.Cunn.
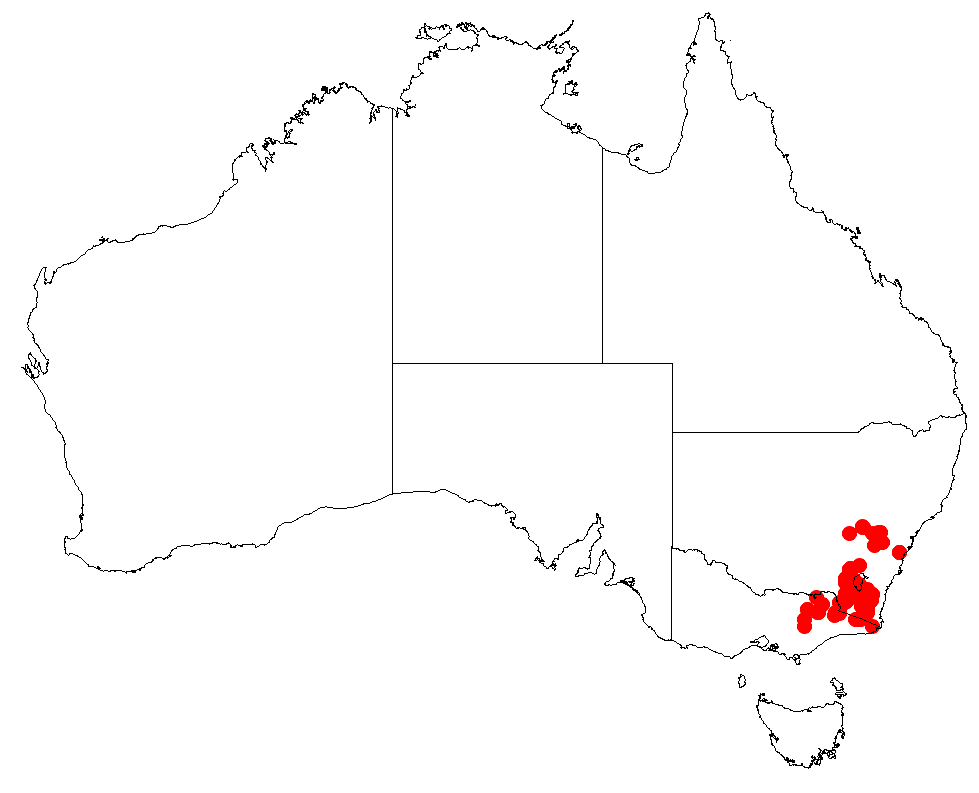
- Occurrence data from AVH

= Bossiaea foliosa =

Leafy bossiaea

Species of legume

Bossiaea foliosa, commonly known as leafy bossiaea, is a species of flowering plant in the family Fabaceae and is endemic to south-eastern Australia. It is an erect shrub with small, broadly egg-shaped to round leaves, and bright yellow flowers.

== Description ==
Bossiaea foliosa is an erect shrub that typically grows to a height of up to about 1.5 m (4 ft 11 in) and has hairy branches. The leaves are arranged alternately along the stems, broadly egg-shaped to more or less round, 1.5–3 mm (0.059–0.118 in) long and 1.5–3.5 mm (0.059–0.138 in) wide with more or less persistent triangular stipules 0.4–1 mm (0.016–0.039 in) long at the base. The flowers are 5–7 mm (0.20–0.28 in) long and arranged singly in leaf axils, each flower on a pedicel up to 2 mm (0.079 in) long with a few crowded bracts about 0.5 mm (0.020 in) long. The sepals are 2.0–3.5 mm (0.079–0.138 in) long with narrow elliptic bracteoles 0.5–1.0 mm (0.020–0.039 in) long at the base of the sepal tube. The petals are uniformly bright yellow, the petals more or less equal in length. Flowering occurs from October to December and the fruit is a more or less round pod 5–8 mm (0.20–0.31 in) long.

== Taxonomy ==
Bossiaea foliosa was first formally described in 1825 by Allan Cunningham who found it growing in "brushy forest-land near Bathurst" and published the description in the chapter "On the Botany of the Blue Mountains" of Barron Field's book, Geographical Memoirs on New South Wales. The specific epithet (foliosa) means "leafy".

== Distribution and habitat ==
Leafy bossiaea grows in open forest and woodland, sometimes in Sphagnum bogs, at high altitudes south from near Orange in New South Wales through the Australian Capital Territory to the ranges in the east and north-east of Victoria.
