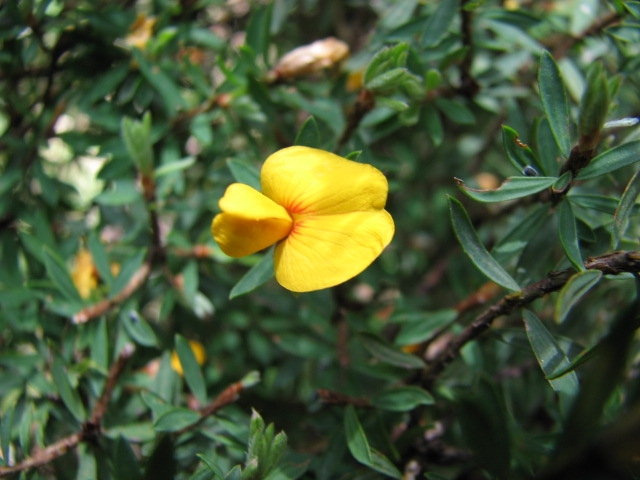
- In Baw Baw National Park

Scientific classification
- Kingdom: Plantae
- Clade: Tracheophytes
- Clade: Angiosperms
- Clade: Eudicots
- Clade: Rosids
- Order: Fabales
- Family: Fabaceae
- Subfamily: Faboideae
- Genus: Pultenaea
- Species: P. muelleri

Binomial name
- Pultenaea muelleri Benth.

Synonyms
- Pultenaea muelleri Benth. var. muelleri

= Pultenaea muelleri =

Mueller's bush-pea

Species of legume

Pultenaea muelleri, commonly known as Mueller's bush-pea, is a species of flowering plant in the family Fabaceae and is endemic to Victoria, Australia. It is a dense shrub with hairy stems, elliptic to narrow egg-shaped leaves with the narrower end towards the base, and yellow and red flowers arranged singly or in pairs on the ends of short side shoots.

== Description ==
Pultenaea muelleri is a shrub that typically grows to a height of 1–3 m (3 ft 3 in – 9 ft 10 in) and has stems covered with tangled hairs. The leaves are elliptic to narrow egg-shaped with the narrower end towards the base, 7–15 mm (0.28–0.59 in) long and 1.5–2 mm (0.059–0.079 in) wide with three or more parallel veins. The edges of the leaves curve inwards and there are stipules 2–3 mm (0.079–0.118 in) long at the base. The flowers are arranged singly or in pairs on the ends of short side shoots with broadly egg-shaped, papery bracts 1–3 mm (0.039–0.118 in) long. The sepals are 5–6 mm (0.20–0.24 in) long with egg-shaped bracteoles about 3 mm (0.12 in) long attached at the base of the sepal tube. The standard petal is 9–10 mm (0.35–0.39 in) long and yellow with a red base. Flowering occurs from November to January and the fruit is a hairy pod.

== Taxonomy ==
Pultenaea muelleri was first formally described in 1864 by George Bentham in Flora Australiensis. The specific epithet (muelleri) honours Ferdinand von Mueller.

== Distribution and habitat ==
Mueller's bush-pea grows on slopes in mountain forest and subalpine snow gum woodland mostly to the east of Melbourne.
