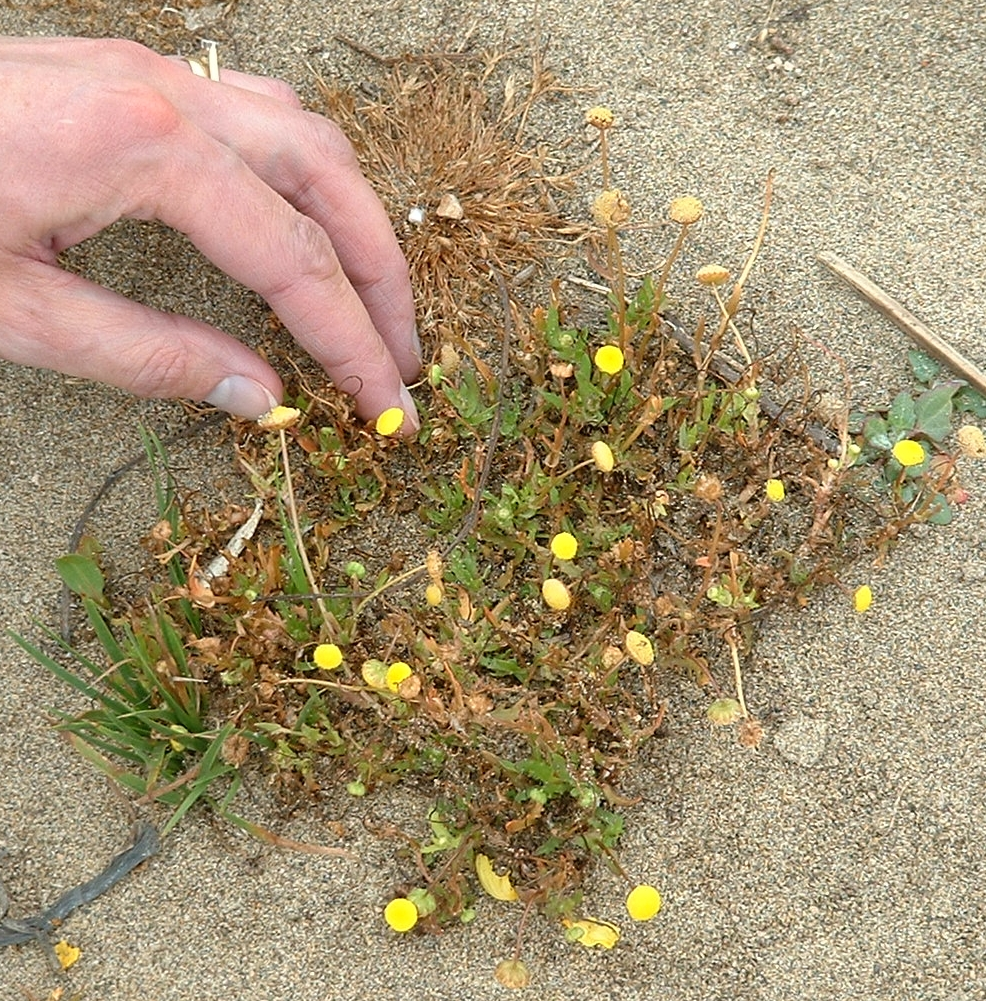
- Cotula coronopifolia

Scientific classification
- Kingdom: Plantae
- Clade: Embryophytes
- Clade: Tracheophytes
- Clade: Spermatophytes
- Clade: Angiosperms
- Clade: Eudicots
- Clade: Asterids
- Order: Asterales
- Family: Asteraceae
- Subfamily: Asteroideae
- Tribe: Anthemideae
- Genus: Cotula; L.

Type species
- Cotula coronopifolia L.

Synonyms
- Baldingeria Neck.; Gymnogyne Steetz; Peyrousea DC.; Lancisia Lam.; Pleiogyne K.Koch; Strongylosperma Less.; Cenia Comm. ex Juss.; Cenia sect. Actinocenia DC.; Hippia L.f.; Ctenosperma Hook.f.; Lancisia Fabr.; Machlis DC.; Otochlamys DC.; Cotyla O.Kuntze & T. von Post

= Cotula =

Genus of flowering plants in the sunflower family

Cotula is a genus of flowering plant in the sunflower family. It includes plants known generally as water buttons or buttonweeds.

The species within this genus can vary extensively in their habit, leaf division, involucre, receptacle and achenes. This makes it difficult to define them by comparing their morphology. The genus can only be defined by looking at the corollas of their flowers. Most are disciform (lacking ray florets). These corollas may be tubular, reduced or even absent. Another characteristic is their solitary heads growing on a peduncle.

== Taxonomy ==
Cotula is the largest genus found in the Southern Hemisphere of the tribe Anthemideae. This genus was first mentioned by Carl Linnaeus, who described four species in his first edition (1753) of Species Plantarum. In 1867 the genus was subdivided by George Bentham into three sections. Since his account, only a few changes have been made but the number of species has remained more or less stable. The sections possess different basic chromosome numbers :

- section Cotula : largest section with about 40 species; mostly in South Africa, a few in North Africa and Australia + the cosmopolitan species C. coronopifolia and the widespread species C. turbinata; this section also includes the former genera Cenia and Otochlamys; basic chromosome numbers x = 8 and x = 10.
- section Strongylosperma (Less.) Benth.: a total of eight species, found in warmer parts of Africa and Asia (often lumped as C. anthemoides), Central and South America (C. mexicana) and Australia (five species, including C. australis); basic chromosome number : x = 18
- section Leptinella (Cass.) Hook f. : the remaining thirty species, found in South America and the Falkland Islands (the type species C. scariosa), New Zealand, the Subantarctic Islands (together 24) and five species from Australia and New Zealand.; the species in this section have a distinctive characteristic not found in the other sections : inflated pistillate corollas; basic chromosome number : x = 13. See also Leptinella.

David G. Lloyd has proposed that the five species from Australia and New Guinea are distinctive enough from the other species from the section Leptinella to be brought under a new section with the proposed name Oligoleima (type species C. longipes).

Species

- Cotula abyssinica Sch.Bip. ex A.Rich.
- Cotula alpina (Hook.f.) Hook.f.
- Cotula andreae (E.Phillips) K.Bremer & Humphries
- Cotula anthemoides L.
- Cotula aurea L.
- Cotula australis (Sieber ex Spreng.) Hook.f.
- Cotula barbata DC.
- Cotula bipinnata Thunb.
- Cotula bracteolata E.Mey. ex DC.
- Cotula burchellii DC.
- Cotula ceniifolia DC.
- Cotula chamaemelifolia Ehrenb. ex K.Koch
- Cotula cinereum
- Cotula coronopifolia L.
- Cotula cotuloides (Steetz) Druce
- Cotula cryptocephala Sch.Bip. ex A.Rich.
- Cotula dielsii Muschl.
- Cotula duckittiae (L.Bolus) K.Bremer & Humphries
- Cotula eckloniana (DC.) Levyns
- Cotula elongata B.Vogel
- Cotula filifolia Thunb.
- Cotula goughensis R.N.R.Br.
- Cotula gymnogyne F.Muell. ex Benth.
- Cotula hemisphaerica Wall. ex Benth. & Hook.f.
- Cotula heterocarpa DC.
- Cotula hispida (DC.) Harv.
- Cotula laxa DC.
- Cotula leptalea DC.
- Cotula lineariloba (DC.) Hilliard
- Cotula loganii Hutch.
- Cotula macroglossa Bolus ex Schltr.
- Cotula mariae K.Bremer & Humphries
- Cotula melaleuca Bolus
- Cotula membranifolia Hilliard
- Cotula mexicana (DC.) Cabrera
- Cotula microglossa (DC.) O.Hoffm. & Kuntze ex Kuntze
- Cotula montana Compton
- Cotula moseleyi Hemsl.
- Cotula myriophylloides Harv.
- Cotula nigellifolia (DC.) K.Bremer & Humphries
- Cotula nudicaulis Thunb.
- Cotula paludosa Hilliard
- Cotula paradoxa Schinz
- Cotula pedicellata Compton
- Cotula pedunculata (Schltr.) E.Phillips
- Cotula pterocarpa DC.
- Cotula pusilla Thunb.
- Cotula radiata O.Hoffm. ex Kuntze
- Cotula radicalis (Killick & Claassen) Hilliard & B.L.Burtt
- Cotula reptans (Benth.) Benth.
- Cotula rosea Boj. ex Less.
- Cotula sericea L.f.
- Cotula socialis Hilliard
- Cotula sororia DC.
- Cotula squalida (Hook.f.) Hook.f.
- Cotula tenella E.Mey. ex DC.
- Cotula thunbergii Harv.
- Cotula turbinata L.
- Cotula villosa DC.
- Cotula vulgaris Levyns
- Cotula zeyheri Fenzl

== Uses ==
Cotula is used in New Zealand as ground cover for bowling greens, playing fields on which the ball-game of bowls is played.
