= List of Helichrysum species =

The following species in the flowering plant genus Helichrysum are accepted by Plants of the World Online. The taxonomy of this genus is complex and remains unresolved.

== A ==
- Helichrysum abbayesii Humbert
- Helichrysum abietifolium Humbert
- Helichrysum abietinum O.Hoffm.
- Helichrysum acervatum S.Moore
- Helichrysum achryroclinoides Baker
- Helichrysum acrophilum Bolus
- Helichrysum acutatum DC.
- Helichrysum adenocarpum DC.
- Helichrysum albanense Hilliard
- Helichrysum albertense Hilliard
- Helichrysum albiflorum Moeser
- Helichrysum albilanatum Hilliard
- Helichrysum albirosulatum Killick
- Helichrysum albobrunneum S.Moore
- Helichrysum album N.E.Br.
- Helichrysum allioides Less.
- Helichrysum alsinoides DC.
- Helichrysum alticola Bolus
- Helichrysum altigenum Schltr. & Moeser
- Helichrysum alucense García-Cas., S.Scholz & E.Hernandez
- Helichrysum × ambiguum (Pers.) C.Presl
- Helichrysum amblyphyllum Mattf.
- Helichrysum amboense Schinz
- Helichrysum ambondrombeense Humbert
- Helichrysum ambositrense Humbert
- Helichrysum ammitophilum Hilliard
- Helichrysum amorginum Boiss. & Orph.
- Helichrysum amplectens Hilliard
- Helichrysum andohahelense Humbert
- Helichrysum angavense Humbert
- Helichrysum angustifrondeum S.Moore
- Helichrysum anomalum Less.
- Helichrysum antandroi Scott Elliot
- Helichrysum aphelexioides DC.
- Helichrysum appendiculatum Less.
- Helichrysum araxinum Takht. ex Kirp.
- Helichrysum arbuscula Chiov.
- Helichrysum archeri Compton
- Helichrysum archimedeum C.Brullo & Brullo
- Helichrysum arenarium (L.) Moench
- Helichrysum arenicola M.D.Hend.
- Helichrysum argentissimum J.M.Wood
- Helichrysum argyranthum O.Hoffm.
- Helichrysum argyrochlamys Humbert
- Helichrysum argyrolepis MacOwan
- Helichrysum argyrophyllum DC.
- Helichrysum argyrosphaerum DC.
- Helichrysum armenium DC.
- Helichrysum arnicoides Cordem.
- Helichrysum artemisioides Boiss. & Hausskn.
- Helichrysum artvinense P.H.Davis & Kupicha
- Helichrysum arussense Chiov.
- Helichrysum arwae J.R.I.Wood
- Helichrysum asperum (Thunb.) Hilliard & B.L.Burtt
- Helichrysum athanaton Georgiadou & Rech.f.
- Helichrysum athrixiifolium (Kuntze) Moeser
- Helichrysum attenuatum Humbert
- Helichrysum aucheri Boiss.
- Helichrysum aurantiacum Boiss. & A.Huet
- Helichrysum aureofolium Hilliard
- Helichrysum aureolum Hilliard
- Helichrysum aureum (Houtt.) Merr.
- Helichrysum auriceps Hilliard
- Helichrysum auronitens Sch.Bip.

== B ==
- Helichrysum bachmannii Klatt
- Helichrysum bakeri Humbert
- Helichrysum bampsianum Lisowski
- Helichrysum baronii Humbert
- Helichrysum barorum Humbert
- Helichrysum basalticum Hilliard
- Helichrysum bellidiastrum Moeser
- Helichrysum bellum Hilliard
- Helichrysum benguellense Hiern
- Helichrysum benoistii Humbert
- Helichrysum benthamii R.Vig. & Humbert
- Helichrysum betsiliense Klatt
- Helichrysum biafranum Hook.f.
- Helichrysum boiteaui Humbert
- Helichrysum bracteiferum Humbert
- Helichrysum brassii Brenan
- Helichrysum brevifolium Humbert
- Helichrysum brownei S.Moore
- Helichrysum brunioides Moeser
- Helichrysum buchananii Engl.
- Helichrysum buddlejoides DC.
- Helichrysum bujerianum DC.
- Helichrysum buschii Juz.

== C ==
- Helichrysum caespititium (DC.) Sond.
- Helichrysum callicomum Harv.
- Helichrysum calocephalum Klatt
- Helichrysum calocladum Humbert
- Helichrysum calvertianum (F.Muell.) F.Muell.
- Helichrysum cameroonense Hutch. & Dalziel
- Helichrysum campanulatum Humbert
- Helichrysum camusianum Humbert
- Helichrysum candolleanum H.Buek
- Helichrysum capense Hilliard
- Helichrysum cataractarum Beentje
- Helichrysum catipes Harv.
- Helichrysum cephaloideum DC.
- Helichrysum cerastoides DC.
- Helichrysum cespitosum DC.
- Helichrysum chamaeyucca Humbert
- Helichrysum chasei Wild
- Helichrysum chasmolycium P.H.Davis
- Helichrysum chermezonii Humbert
- Helichrysum chionoides Philipson
- Helichrysum chionophilum Boiss. & Balansa
- Helichrysum chionosphaerum DC.
- Helichrysum chrysargyrum Moeser
- Helichrysum chrysophorum S.Moore
- Helichrysum citricephalum Hilliard & B.L.Burtt
- Helichrysum citrispinum Delile
- Helichrysum cochinchinense Spreng.
- Helichrysum cochleariforme DC.
- Helichrysum compactum Boiss.
- Helichrysum concursum S.Moore
- Helichrysum confertifolium Klatt
- Helichrysum confertum N.E.Br.
- Helichrysum congolanum Schltr. & O.Hoffm.
- Helichrysum cooperi Harv.
- Helichrysum cordifolium DC.
- Helichrysum coriaceum Sond.
- Helichrysum coursii Humbert
- Helichrysum crassifolium (L.) D.Don ex G.Don
- Helichrysum cremnophilum Humbert
- Helichrysum crispum D.Don ex G.Don
- Helichrysum cryptomerioides Baker
- Helichrysum cuspidatum Mesfin & T.Reilly
- Helichrysum cutchicum (C.B.Clarke) R.S.Rao & Deshp.
- Helichrysum cylindriflorum (L.) Hilliard & B.L.Burtt
- Helichrysum cymosum (L.) D.Don ex G.Don

== D ==
- Helichrysum danguyanum Humbert
- Helichrysum dasyanthum Sweet
- Helichrysum dasycephalum O.Hoffm.
- Helichrysum dasymallum Hilliard
- Helichrysum decaryi Humbert
- Helichrysum decorum DC.
- Helichrysum decrescentisquamatum Humbert
- Helichrysum deltoideum Humbert
- Helichrysum denae Ponert
- Helichrysum depressum (Hook.f.) Benth. & Hook.f.
- Helichrysum deserticola Hilliard
- Helichrysum devium J.Y.Johnson
- Helichrysum devredii Lisowski
- Helichrysum dichotomum Humbert
- Helichrysum dichroolepis Brenan
- Helichrysum dichroum Humbert
- Helichrysum difficile Hilliard
- Helichrysum diffusum DC.
- Helichrysum dimorphotrichum Humbert
- Helichrysum diotoides DC.
- Helichrysum doerfleri Rech.f.
- Helichrysum dracaenifolium Humbert
- Helichrysum drakensbergense Killick
- Helichrysum dregeanum Sond. & Harv.
- Helichrysum dubardii R.Vig. & Humbert
- Helichrysum dunense Hilliard
- Helichrysum duvigneaudii Lisowski

== E ==
- Helichrysum ecklonis Sond.
- Helichrysum edwardsii Wild
- Helichrysum elegantissimum DC.
- Helichrysum elephantinum Cufod.
- Helichrysum ellipticifolium Moeser
- Helichrysum ephelos Hilliard
- Helichrysum erigavoanum Mesfin & T.Reilly
- Helichrysum errerae Tineo
- Helichrysum erubescens Hilliard
- Helichrysum evansii Hilliard
- Helichrysum excisum Less.

== F ==
- Helichrysum faradifani Scott Elliot
- Helichrysum felinum Less.
- Helichrysum ferganicum Lazkov & Sultanova
- Helichrysum filaginoides Humbert
- Helichrysum filicaule Hook.f.
- Helichrysum flagellare Baker
- Helichrysum flammeiceps Brenan
- Helichrysum flanaganii Bolus
- Helichrysum foetidum Moench
- Helichrysum foliosum Humbert
- Helichrysum × fontqueri J.M.Aparicio, D.Mesa, J.Moro & F.Royo
- Helichrysum formosissimum Sch.Bip.
- Helichrysum forskahlii (J.F.Gmel.) Hilliard & B.L.Burtt
- Helichrysum forsythii Humbert
- Helichrysum fourcadei Hilliard
- Helichrysum foveolatum Ponert
- Helichrysum fruticans D.Don
- Helichrysum fulgens Humbert & Staner
- Helichrysum fulvescens DC.
- Helichrysum fulvum N.E.Br.
- Helichrysum funereum Chiov.

== G ==
- Helichrysum gaharoense Moeser & Schltr.
- Helichrysum galpinii N.E.Br.
- Helichrysum gariepinum DC.
- Helichrysum geayi Humbert & Humbert
- Helichrysum geminatum Klatt
- Helichrysum geniorum Humbert
- Helichrysum glaciale Hilliard
- Helichrysum glanduliferum Sch.Bip.
- Helichrysum glandulosum Ledeb.
- Helichrysum globiferum Boiss.
- Helichrysum globosum Sch.Bip.
- Helichrysum glomeratum Klatt
- Helichrysum gloria-dei Chiov.
- Helichrysum glossophyllum Humbert
- Helichrysum glumaceum DC.
- Helichrysum goetzeanum O.Hoffm.
- Helichrysum gofense Cufod.
- Helichrysum gossypinum Sch.Bip.
- Helichrysum goulandriorum Georgiadou
- Helichrysum gradatum Humbert
- Helichrysum grandibracteatum M.D.Hend.
- Helichrysum grandiflorum D.Don
- Helichrysum graniticola Wild
- Helichrysum graveolens (M.Bieb.) Sweet
- Helichrysum griseolanatum Hilliard
- Helichrysum griseum Sond.
- Helichrysum gymnocephalum Humbert
- Helichrysum gymnocomum DC.

== H ==
- Helichrysum hamulosum DC.
- Helichrysum harennense Mesfin
- Helichrysum harveyanum Wild
- Helichrysum haygarthii Bolus
- Helichrysum hebelepis DC.
- Helichrysum hedbergianum Mesfin & T.Reilly
- Helichrysum heldreichii Boiss.
- Helichrysum helianthemifolium D.Don ex G.Don
- Helichrysum heliotropifolium DC.
- Helichrysum helvolum Moeser
- Helichrysum herbaceum (Andrews) Sweet
- Helichrysum herniarioides DC.
- Helichrysum heterolasium Hilliard
- Helichrysum heterotrichum Humbert
- Helichrysum heywoodianum P.H.Davis
- Helichrysum hilliardiae Wild
- Helichrysum hirtum Humbert
- Helichrysum homilochrysum S.Moore
- Helichrysum hookerianum Wight & Arn. ex DC.
- Helichrysum horridum (Sch.Bip.) A.Rich.
- Helichrysum humbertii Sillans
- Helichrysum humblotii Klatt
- Helichrysum hyblaeum Brullo
- Helichrysum hyphocephalum Hilliard
- Helichrysum hypoleucum Harv.

== I–J ==
- Helichrysum ibityense R.Vig. & Humbert
- Helichrysum incarnatum DC.
- Helichrysum indicum (L.) Grierson
- Helichrysum indutum Humbert
- Helichrysum ingomense Hilliard
- Helichrysum inornatum Hilliard & B.L.Burtt
- Helichrysum interjacens Hilliard
- Helichrysum interzonale Compton
- Helichrysum intricatum DC.
- Helichrysum inyangense Wild
- Helichrysum isalense Humbert
- Helichrysum isolepis Bolus
- Helichrysum italicum (Roth) G.Don
- Helichrysum itremense Humbert
- Helichrysum jubilatum Hilliard
- Helichrysum junodii Moeser

== K ==
- Helichrysum kalandanum Lisowski
- Helichrysum × kani-isikii Semiz, Şenol & Günal
- Helichrysum kashgaricum C.H.An
- Helichrysum keilii Moeser
- Helichrysum kermanicum Mozaff. & Rajaei
- Helichrysum kilimanjari Oliv.
- Helichrysum kirkii Oliv. & Hiern
- Helichrysum kitianum Yıldız
- Helichrysum korongoni Beentje
- Helichrysum kraussii Sch.Bip.
- Helichrysum krebsianum Less.
- Helichrysum krookii Moeser

== L ==
- Helichrysum lacteum Coss. & Durieu
- Helichrysum lambertianum DC.
- Helichrysum lancifolium Willd.
- Helichrysum lanuginosum Humbert & Humbert
- Helichrysum lastii Engl.
- Helichrysum lavanduloides DC.
- Helichrysum lawalreeanum Lisowski
- Helichrysum lecomtei R.Vig. & Humbert
- Helichrysum leimanthium Klatt
- Helichrysum lejolyanum Lisowski
- Helichrysum leontonyx DC.
- Helichrysum lepidissimum S.Moore
- Helichrysum leptocephalum (DC.) Humbert
- Helichrysum leptorhizum DC.
- Helichrysum lesliei Hilliard
- Helichrysum leucocephalum Boiss.
- Helichrysum leucocladum Humbert
- Helichrysum leucopsideum DC.
- Helichrysum leucosphaerum Baker
- Helichrysum lineare DC.
- Helichrysum lineatum Bolus
- Helichrysum lingulatum Hilliard
- Helichrysum litorale Bolus
- Helichrysum litoreum Guss.
- Helichrysum longifolium DC.
- Helichrysum longinquum Hilliard
- Helichrysum longiramum Moeser
- Helichrysum lucilioides Less.
- Helichrysum luzulifolium DC.

== M ==
- Helichrysum madagascariense DC.
- Helichrysum maestum Wild
- Helichrysum mahafaly Humbert
- Helichrysum malaisseanum Lisowski
- Helichrysum mandrarense Humbert
- Helichrysum mangorense Humbert
- Helichrysum mannii Hook.f.
- Helichrysum manopappoides Humbert
- Helichrysum maracandicum Popov ex Kirp.
- Helichrysum maranguense O.Hoffm.
- Helichrysum marginatum DC.
- Helichrysum mariepscopicum Hilliard
- Helichrysum marifolium DC.
- Helichrysum marlothianum O.Hoffm.
- Helichrysum marmarolepis S.Moore
- Helichrysum marojejyense Humbert
- Helichrysum massanellanum Herrando, J.M.Blanco, L.Sáez & Galbany
- Helichrysum mauritianum A.J.Scott
- Helichrysum mechowianum Klatt
- Helichrysum melaleucum Rchb. ex Holl
- Helichrysum melanacme DC.
- Helichrysum membranaceum Wild
- Helichrysum meyeri-johannis Engl.
- Helichrysum miconiifolium DC.
- Helichrysum microcephalum DC.
- Helichrysum micropoides DC.
- Helichrysum mildbraedii Moeser
- Helichrysum milfordiae Killick
- Helichrysum milleri Hilliard
- Helichrysum milne-redheadii Brenan
- Helichrysum mimetes S.Moore
- Helichrysum minutiflorum Humbert
- Helichrysum mirabile Humbert
- Helichrysum mixtum O.Hoffm.
- Helichrysum moeserianum Thell.
- Helichrysum moggii Wild
- Helichrysum molestum Hilliard
- Helichrysum mollifolium Hilliard
- Helichrysum monizii Lowe
- Helichrysum monodianum Quézel
- Helichrysum monogynum B.L.Burtt & Sunding
- Helichrysum montanum DC.
- Helichrysum monticola Hilliard
- Helichrysum montis-cati Hilliard
- Helichrysum mossamedense (Hiern) Mendonça
- Helichrysum mundii Harv.
- Helichrysum mussae Nevski
- Helichrysum mutabile Hilliard
- Helichrysum mutisiifolium Less.
- Helichrysum myriocephalum Humbert

== N ==
- Helichrysum nanum Klatt
- Helichrysum natalitium DC.
- Helichrysum nebrodense Heldr.
- Helichrysum neoachyroclinoides Humbert
- Helichrysum neocaledonicum Schltr.
- Helichrysum neoisalense Humbert
- Helichrysum nervicinctum Humbert
- Helichrysum newii Oliv. & Hiern
- Helichrysum nicolai N.Kilian, Galbany & Oberpr.
- Helichrysum nimbicola Hilliard
- Helichrysum nitens Oliv. & Hiern
- Helichrysum niveum Less.
- Helichrysum noeanum Boiss.
- Helichrysum nogaicum Tzvelev
- Helichrysum nudifolium (L.) Less.
- Helichrysum nuratavicum Krasch.

== O ==
- Helichrysum obconicum DC.
- Helichrysum obductum Bolus
- Helichrysum obtusum Moeser
- Helichrysum ochraceum Klatt
- Helichrysum odoratissimum (L.) Sweet
- Helichrysum ogadense Mesfin
- Helichrysum oligocephalum DC.
- Helichrysum oligochaetum F.Muell.
- Helichrysum oligopappum Bolus
- Helichrysum onivense Humbert
- Helichrysum oocephalum Boiss.
- Helichrysum opacum Klatt
- Helichrysum orbicularifolium Sümbül, Göktürk & O.D.Düșen
- Helichrysum oreophilum Klatt
- Helichrysum orientale (L.) Gaertn.
- Helichrysum orothamnus Humbert
- Helichrysum outeniquense Hilliard
- Helichrysum oxybelium DC.

== P–Q ==
- Helichrysum pagophilum M.D.Hend.
- Helichrysum paleatum Hilliard
- Helichrysum pallasii (Spreng.) Ledeb.
- Helichrysum pallens S.Moore
- Helichrysum pallidum DC.
- Helichrysum palustre Hilliard
- Helichrysum pamphylicum P.H.Davis & Kupicha
- Helichrysum panduratum O.Hoffm. ex De Wild. & T.Durand
- Helichrysum pandurifolium Schrank
- Helichrysum pannosum DC.
- Helichrysum panormitanum Guss.
- Helichrysum paronychioides DC.
- Helichrysum pascuosum S.Moore
- Helichrysum patulifolium Baker
- Helichrysum patulum D.Don
- Helichrysum paulayanum Vierh.
- Helichrysum pawekiae Wild
- Helichrysum pedunculatum Hilliard & B.L.Burtt
- Helichrysum pendulum (C.Presl) C.Presl
- Helichrysum pentzioides Less.
- Helichrysum perlanigerum Gamble
- Helichrysum perrieri Humbert
- Helichrysum persicum F.Ghahrem. & Noori
- Helichrysum peshmenianum S.Erik
- Helichrysum petiolare Hilliard & B.L.Burtt
- Helichrysum petraeum Hilliard
- Helichrysum phylicifolium DC.
- Helichrysum plantago DC.
- Helichrysum platycephalum Baker
- Helichrysum platypterum DC.
- Helichrysum plebeium DC.
- Helichrysum plicatum DC.
- Helichrysum plinthocalyx Sosn.
- Helichrysum pluriceps K.Koch
- Helichrysum polhillianum Lisowski
- Helichrysum polioides B.L.Burtt
- Helichrysum polycladum Klatt
- Helichrysum pomelianum Greuter
- Helichrysum populifolium DC.
- Helichrysum praecinctum Klatt
- Helichrysum praecurrens Hilliard
- Helichrysum proteoides (Lam.) Baker
- Helichrysum pseudoanaxeton Humbert
- Helichrysum psiadiifolium Mesfin & T.Reilly
- Helichrysum psilolepis Harv.
- Helichrysum psychrophilum Boiss.
- Helichrysum pulchellum DC.
- Helichrysum pumilio (O.Hoffm.) Hilliard & B.L.Burtt
- Helichrysum pumilum Hook.f.
- Helichrysum pygmaeum Post
- Helichrysum qathlambanum Hilliard
- Helichrysum quartinianum A.Rich.

== R ==
- Helichrysum raynalianum Quézel
- Helichrysum reflexum N.E.Br.
- Helichrysum refractum Hilliard
- Helichrysum retortoides N.E.Br.
- Helichrysum retortum (L.) Willd.
- Helichrysum retrorsum DC.
- Helichrysum revolutum (Thunb.) Less.
- Helichrysum rhodellum Wild
- Helichrysum × rhodium Rech.f.
- Helichrysum riparium Brenan
- Helichrysum robbrechtianum Lisowski
- Helichrysum roseoniveum Marloth & O.Hoffm.
- Helichrysum rosum Less.
- Helichrysum rotundatum Harv.
- Helichrysum rotundifolium Less.
- Helichrysum ruandense Lisowski
- Helichrysum ruderale Hilliard & B.L.Burtt
- Helichrysum rudolfii Hilliard
- Helichrysum rugulosum Less.
- Helichrysum rutilans (L.) D.Don ex G.Don

== S ==
- Helichrysum saboureaui Humbert
- Helichrysum salviifolium Humbert
- Helichrysum sambiranense Humbert
- Helichrysum sanguineum (L.) Kostel.
- Helichrysum sarcolaenifolium Humbert
- Helichrysum saxatile Moris
- Helichrysum saxicola Hilliard
- Helichrysum scabrum Less.
- Helichrysum schimperi (Sch.Bip. ex A.Rich.) Moeser
- Helichrysum scitulum Hilliard & B.L.Burtt
- Helichrysum sclerochlaenum Sch.Bip. ex Moeser
- Helichrysum semifertile F.Muell.
- Helichrysum serpentinicola Wild
- Helichrysum sessile DC.
- Helichrysum sessilioides Hilliard
- Helichrysum setosum Harv.
- Helichrysum sibthorpii Rouy
- Helichrysum silvaticum Hilliard
- Helichrysum simillimum DC.
- Helichrysum simulans Harv. & Sond.
- Helichrysum sivasicum Kit Tan & Yıldız
- Helichrysum solitarium Hilliard
- Helichrysum somalense Baker f.
- Helichrysum sordidum Humbert
- Helichrysum spencerianum Wild
- Helichrysum sphaeroideum Moeser
- Helichrysum spiciforme DC.
- Helichrysum spiralepis Hilliard & B.L.Burtt
- Helichrysum splendidum Less.
- Helichrysum spodiophyllum Hilliard & B.L.Burtt
- Helichrysum stellatum Less.
- Helichrysum stenoclinoides Humbert
- Helichrysum stenopterum DC.
- Helichrysum stilpnocephalum Humbert
- Helichrysum stoechas (L.) Moench
- Helichrysum stoloniferum (L.f.) Willd.
- Helichrysum stolzii Mattf.
- Helichrysum stuhlmannii O.Hoffm.
- Helichrysum subfalcatum Hilliard
- Helichrysum subglobosum Humbert
- Helichrysum subglomeratum Less.
- Helichrysum subluteum Burtt Davy
- Helichrysum subsimile Rech.f.
- Helichrysum subumbellatum Humbert
- Helichrysum sulphureofuscum Baker
- Helichrysum summo-montanum I.Verd.
- Helichrysum sutherlandii Harv.
- Helichrysum swynnertonii S.Moore
- Helichrysum symoensianum Lisowski
- Helichrysum syncephaloides Humbert

== T ==
- Helichrysum taenari Rothm.
- Helichrysum tanacetiflorum Baker
- Helichrysum tanaiticum P.A.Smirn.
- Helichrysum tardieuae Humbert
- Helichrysum tenax M.D.Hend.
- Helichrysum tenderiense Umanets
- Helichrysum tenue Humbert
- Helichrysum tenuiculum DC.
- Helichrysum tenuifolium Killick
- Helichrysum teretifolium (L.) Sweet
- Helichrysum teydeum (Wildpret & Greuter) Raus
- Helichrysum thapsus O.Hoffm.
- Helichrysum theresae Lisowski
- Helichrysum thianschanicum Regel
- Helichrysum tillandsiifolium O.Hoffm.
- Helichrysum tinctum (Thunb.) Hilliard & B.L.Burtt
- Helichrysum tithonioides Wild
- Helichrysum tomentosulum (Klatt) Merxm.
- Helichrysum tomentosum Humbert
- Helichrysum tongense Hilliard
- Helichrysum translucidum Humbert
- Helichrysum transmontanum Hilliard
- Helichrysum traversii Chiov.
- Helichrysum tricostatum Less.
- Helichrysum trilineatum DC.
- Helichrysum trinervatum Baker
- Helichrysum triplinerve DC.
- Helichrysum truncatum Burtt Davy
- Helichrysum turbinatum Fitzg.
- Helichrysum tysonii Hilliard

== U ==
- Helichrysum umbellulatum S.Moore
- Helichrysum umbraculigerum Less.
- Helichrysum undulifolium Hutch. & B.L.Burtt
- Helichrysum unicapitatum Şenol, Seçmen & B.Öztürk
- Helichrysum uninervium Burtt Davy

== V ==
- Helichrysum vaginatum Humbert
- Helichrysum × valentinum Rouy
- Helichrysum vernum Hilliard
- Helichrysum versicolor O.Hoffm. & Muschl.
- Helichrysum viguieri Humbert
- Helichrysum virgineum DC.
- Helichrysum vohimavense Humbert

== W–X ==
- Helichrysum wightii C.B.Clarke ex Hook.f.
- Helichrysum wilmsii Moeser
- Helichrysum witbergense Bolus
- Helichrysum wittei Hutch. & B.L.Burtt
- Helichrysum woodii N.E.Br.
- Helichrysum xerochrysum DC.
- Helichrysum xylocladum Baker

== Y–Z ==
- Helichrysum yuccifolium (Lam.) DC.
- Helichrysum yuksekovaense Yıld.
- Helichrysum yurterianum Gemici, Kit Tan, Yıldırım & M.Gemici
- Helichrysum zeyheri Less.
- Helichrysum zivojini Černjavski & Soska
- Helichrysum zwartbergense Bolus
