= Helichrysum rupestre =

Helichrysum rupestre is a taxon synonym of three species of Helichrysum:

- Helichrysum rupestre Boiss. = Helichrysum pendulum
- Helichrysum rupestre D.C. = Helichrysum panormitanum subsp. panormitanum
- Helichrysum rupestre Guss. ex Nyman = Helichrysum saxatile subsp. saxatile
