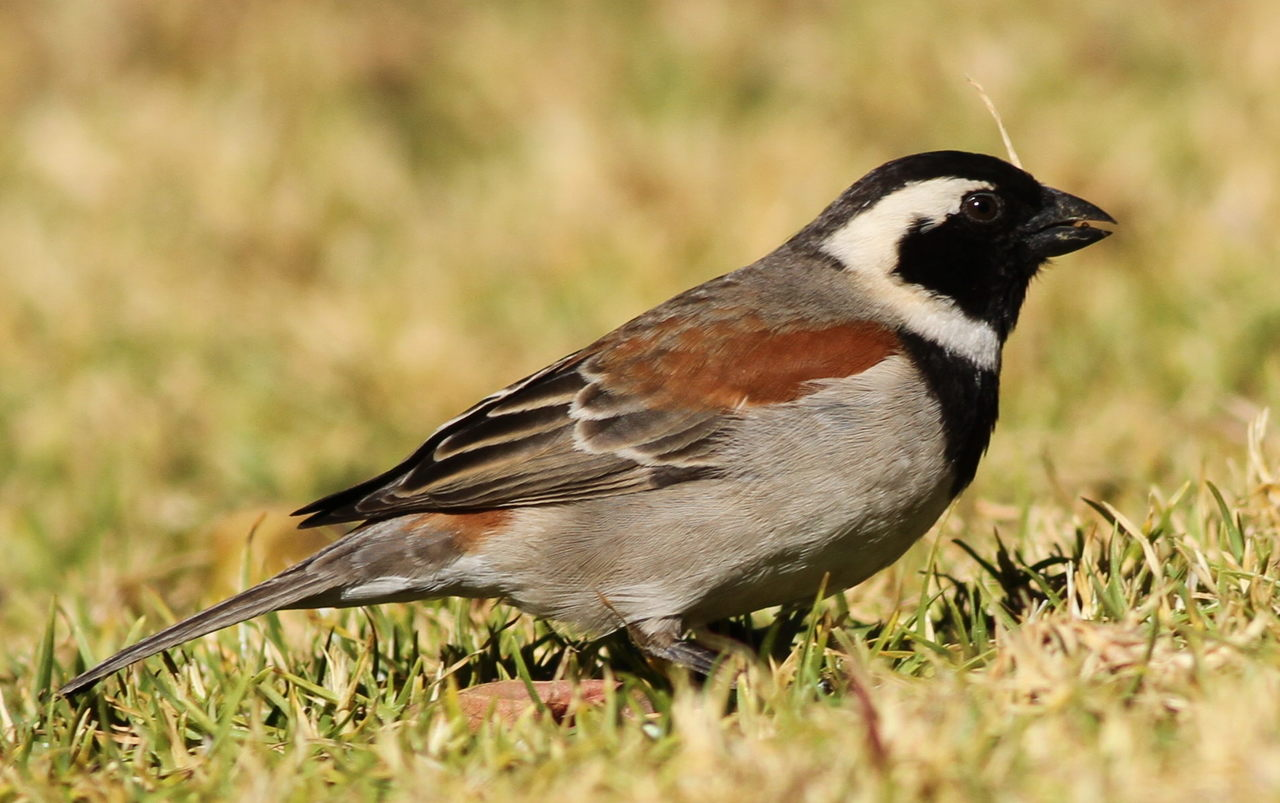
- Male in Roodepoort, South Africa
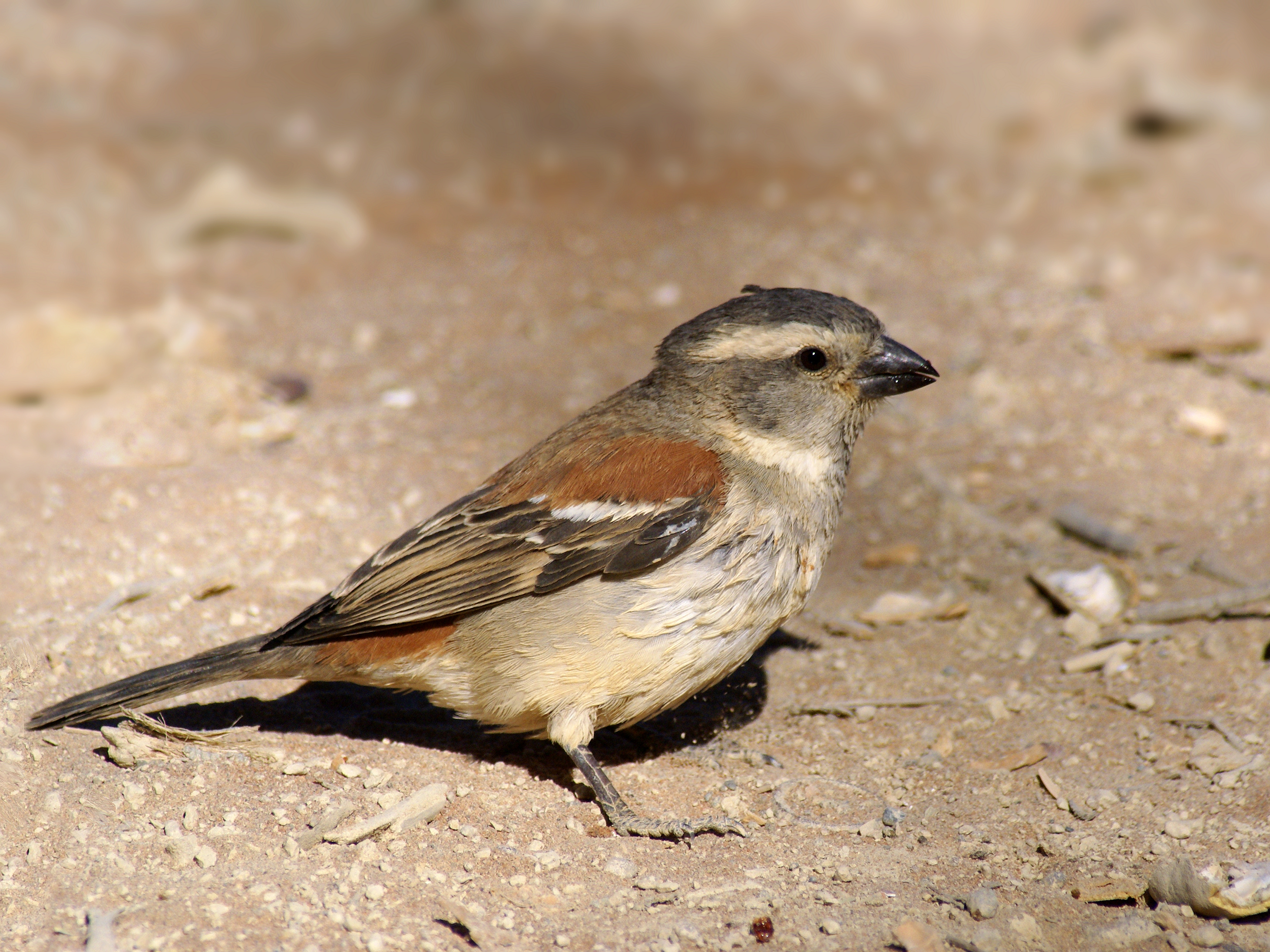
- Female in Sossusvlei, Namibia

Conservation status
- Least Concern (IUCN 3.1)

Scientific classification
- Kingdom: Animalia
- Phylum: Chordata
- Class: Aves
- Order: Passeriformes
- Family: Passeridae
- Genus: Passer
- Species: P. melanurus

Binomial name
- Passer melanurus (Statius Müller, 1776)
- native range

Synonyms
- Loxia melanura Statius Müller, 1776; Fringilla arctuata Gmelin, 1788

= Cape sparrow =

Species of bird

The Cape sparrow (Passer melanurus), or mossie, is a bird of the sparrow family Passeridae found in southern Africa. A medium-sized sparrow at 14–16 centimetres (5.5–6.3 in), it has distinctive plumage, including large pale head stripes in both sexes. Its plumage is mostly grey, brown, and chestnut, and the male has some bold black and white markings on its head and neck. The species inhabits semi-arid savannah, cultivated areas, and towns, and ranges from the central coast of Angola to eastern South Africa and Eswatini. Three subspecies are distinguished in different parts of its range.

Cape sparrows primarily eat seeds, and also eat soft plant parts and insects. They typically breed in colonies, and when not breeding they gather in large nomadic flocks to move around in search of food. The nest can be constructed in a tree, a bush, a cavity, or a disused nest of another species. A typical clutch contains three or four eggs, and both parents are involved in breeding, from nest building to feeding young. The Cape sparrow is common in most of its range and coexists successfully in urban habitats with two of its relatives, the native southern grey-headed sparrow and the house sparrow, an introduced species. The Cape sparrow's population has not been recorded decreasing significantly, and it is not seriously threatened by human activities, so it is assessed as a species of least concern by the International Union for Conservation of Nature (IUCN).

== Description ==
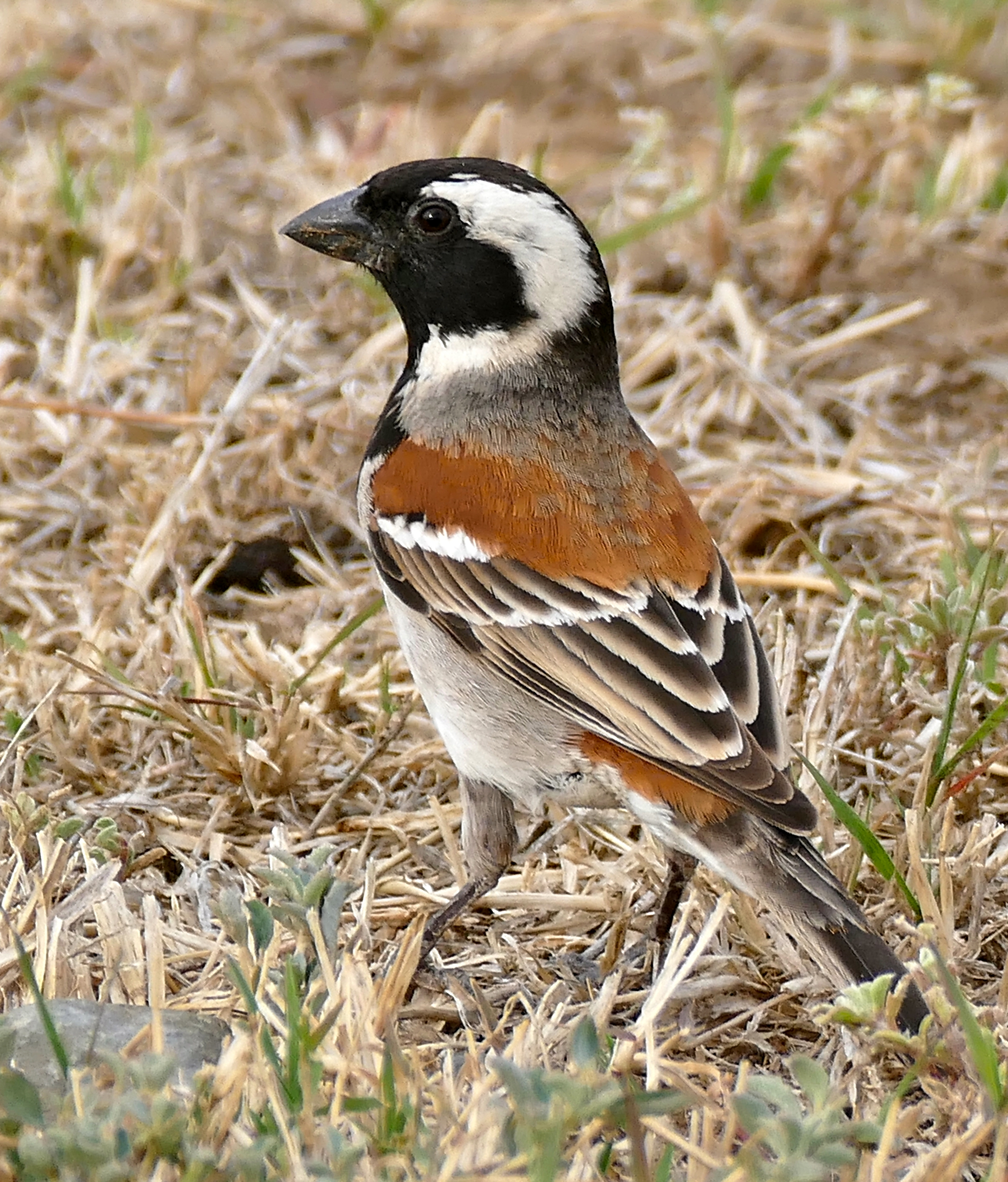
Male at Mountain Zebra National Park

For a sparrow, the Cape sparrow is strikingly coloured and distinctive, and is medium-sized at 14–16 cm (5.5–6.3 in) long. Adults range in weight from 17 to 38 grams (0.60–1.34 oz). The breeding male has a mostly black head, but with a broad white mark on each side, curling from behind the eye to the throat. On the throat a narrow black band connects the black bib of the breast to black of the head. The underparts are greyish, darker on the flanks. The back of the male's neck is dark grey, and its back and shoulders are bright chestnut. The male has a white and a black wing bar below its shoulders, and flight feathers and tail streaked grey and black.

The female is plumaged like the male, but is duller and has a grey head with a different pattern from the male, though it bears a hint of the pale head markings of the male. The juvenile is like the female, but young males have black markings on the head from an early age.

The Cape sparrow's calls are chirps similar to those of the house sparrow, but much more musical and mellow. The basic call is used in flight and while perching socially and transcribed as chissip, chirrup, chreep, or chirrichup. A loud, distinctive call used by the male to advertise nest ownership can be written as tweeng or twileeng; this call can be extended into a jerky and repetitive song, chip cheerup, chip cheerup.

== Taxonomy ==
The Cape sparrow was first taxonomically described by Philipp Ludwig Statius Müller in 1776, as Loxia melanura. Some other earlier biologists described the Cape sparrow in Loxia or Fringilla, but it has otherwise been regarded as a member of the genus Passer along with the house sparrow and other sparrows of the Old World. Within this genus, morphological comparisons and geography were insufficient to elucidate to which species the Cape sparrow is most closely related. Mitochondrial DNA phylogenies have strongly suggested that the Cape sparrow is among the most basal members of its genus, having diverged from the rest of the genus during the late Miocene, over 5 million years ago. It is genetically closest to the southern grey-headed sparrow and the other grey-headed sparrows of Africa and the saxaul sparrow of Central Asia, so these species may be sibling species of the Cape sparrow or similarly early offshoots.

The Cape sparrow's specific epithet comes from the Greek μέλας (melas, "black") and ουρά (oura, "tail"), while the name of the genus Passer comes from a Latin word for small birds.

The Cape sparrow has three subspecies. The nominate subspecies Passer melanurus melanurus is found in western South Africa, east to the western part of Free State. The subspecies vicinus, which is sometimes included in subspecies melanurus, occurs from Free State east to Eastern Cape and Lesotho. The subspecies damarensis ranges from the extreme southern coastal areas of Angola into Namibia, Botswana and southern Zimbabwe, as well as northern South Africa.

== Distribution and habitat ==
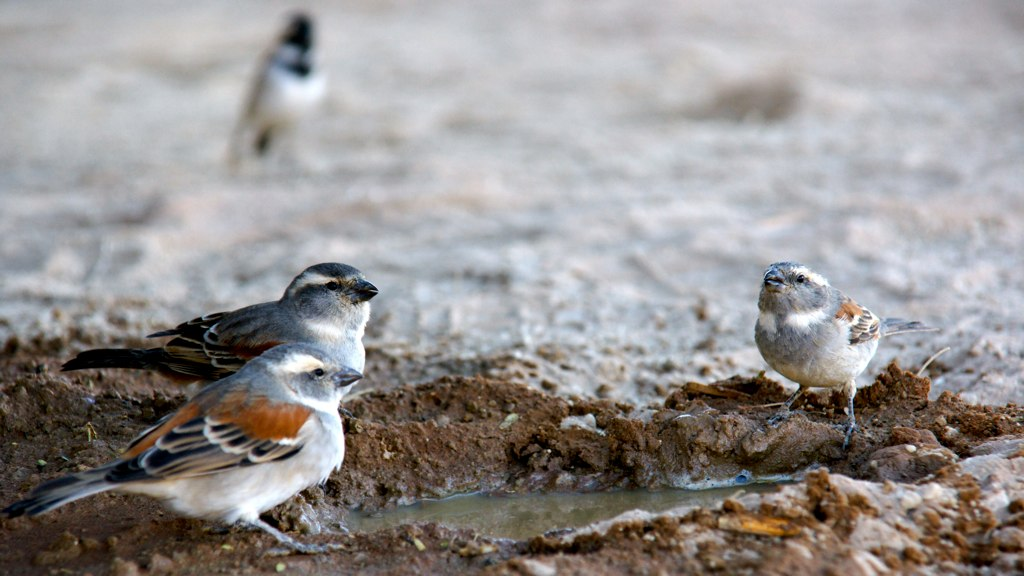
Females drinking at a waterhole in Namibia

The Cape sparrow inhabits southern Africa south of Angola and as far east as Eswatini. The northernmost point in its range is Benguela in Angola, and it is found in the coastal and central parts of Namibia, except for the driest parts of the Namib Desert. It occurs in all of South Africa except the farthest east, in southern Botswana and spottily in the Kalahari Basin of central Botswana. In the east, it breeds at a small number of localities in southeastern Zimbabwe. It has been recorded as a vagrant in Harare, in central Zimbabwe. The eastern limit of its range is reached in the wet forests of Limpopo and KwaZulu Natal, extending into the hills of western Eswatini.

The original habitats of this species were the semi-arid savanna, thornveld, and light woodland typical of southern Africa. When settled agriculture arrived in its range about a thousand years ago, it adapted to cultivated land, and since the arrival of settlement, it has moved into towns. The Cape sparrow prefers habitats with an annual rainfall of less than 75 centimetres (30 in), though in desert areas it is usually found near watercourses or watering holes. While it occurs in urban centres, it prefers parks, gardens, and other open spaces, and has a low reproductive success in more built-up areas.

In towns, the Cape sparrow competes with both the native southern grey-headed sparrow and house sparrow, which was introduced to southern Africa in the 19th century. Since it is more established around humans in its range than either, it successfully competes with both species, though they may exclude it from nesting in holes. A survey by birdwatchers completed in 2000 found the Cape sparrow increasing in abundance in some suburban areas of South Africa (the northern Johannesburg area, and Pietermaritzburg) and decreasing in others (the southern Cape Town area). The house sparrow was reported decreasing in several urban areas, as it has in parts of Europe, declines which are attributed to factors including the increasing density of garden plantings and increases in predation.

== Behaviour ==
=== Social behaviour ===
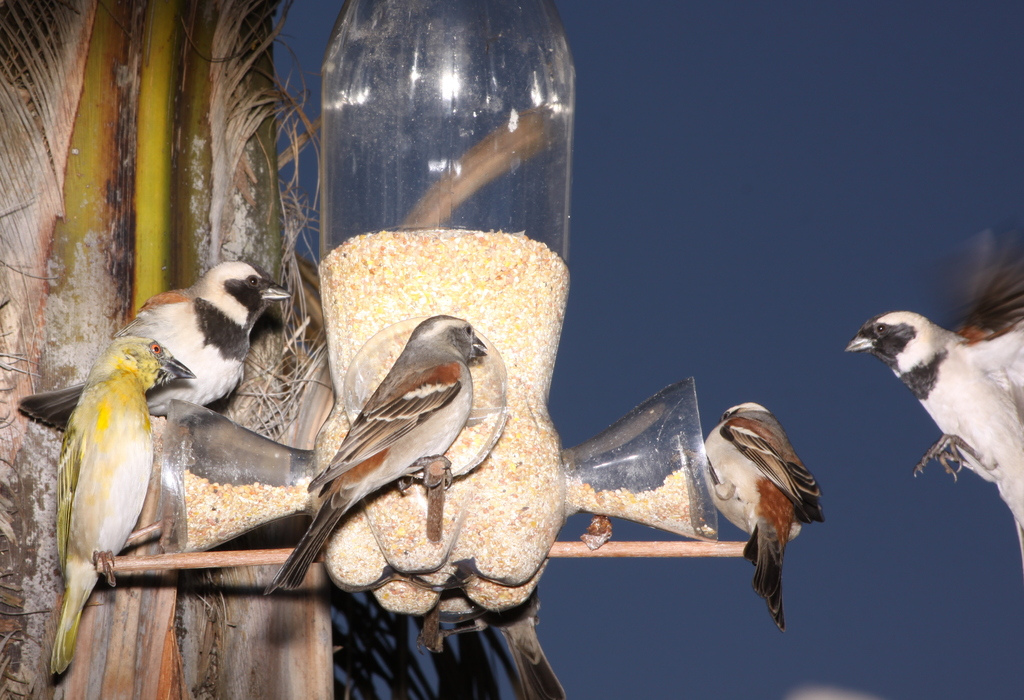
Cape sparrows and a southern masked weaver at a bird feeder in Johannesburg during the winter

The Cape sparrow is social, lives in flocks, and usually breeds in colonies. Away from settled areas it spends much of the year wandering nomadically, in flocks of up to 200 birds. In cultivated and built up areas, smaller flocks form where food is provided for livestock or birds. In such places, it associates with other seed-eating birds, such as the house sparrow, the Cape weaver, and weavers of the genus Euplectes. Birds from urban areas form large flocks seasonally and fly out to the nearby countryside to feed on ripening grain, returning at night to roost.

Cape sparrows prefer to roost in nests, and while wandering outside of the breeding season, birds in uncultivated areas roost socially in old nests or dense bushes. In farmland and towns, Cape sparrows build special nests for roosting, lined more poorly than breeding nests but incorporating a greater quantity of insulating material.

An unusual social behaviour has been described from Cape sparrows in Johannesburg. Groups of 20–30 birds separate from larger flocks and stand close together on the ground with tails on the ground and heads held high. These groups sometimes move in an unconcerted fashion by hopping slowly. Often birds will fly up and hover 30–60 centimetres (12–24 in) above the ground. During these gatherings birds are silent and are never antagonistic. This behaviour's significance is unknown, and it is not reported in any other sparrow species.

=== Feeding ===
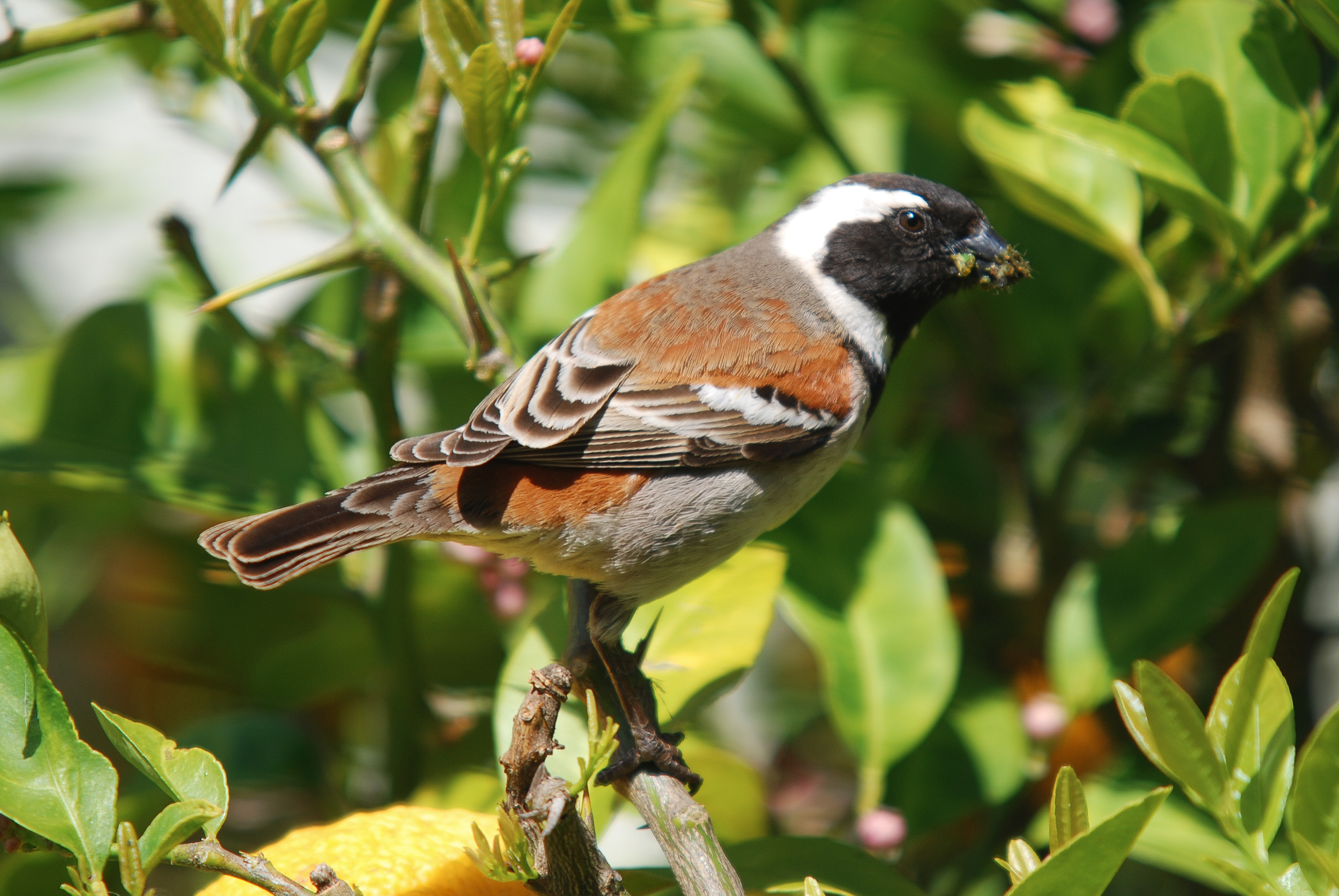
Male Cape sparrow carrying food to feed young

The Cape sparrow mostly eats seeds, foraging in trees and on the ground. The larger seeds of cereals, wild grasses, and other small plants are preferred, with wheat and khakiweed (Alternanthera caracasana) being favourites. Buds and soft fruits are also taken, causing considerable damage to agriculture. Insects are eaten, and nestlings seem to be fed exclusively on caterpillars. The Cape sparrow eats the soft shoots of plants, and probes in aloes for nectar, but these are not important sources of food.

=== Breeding ===
==== Courtship and colonies ====
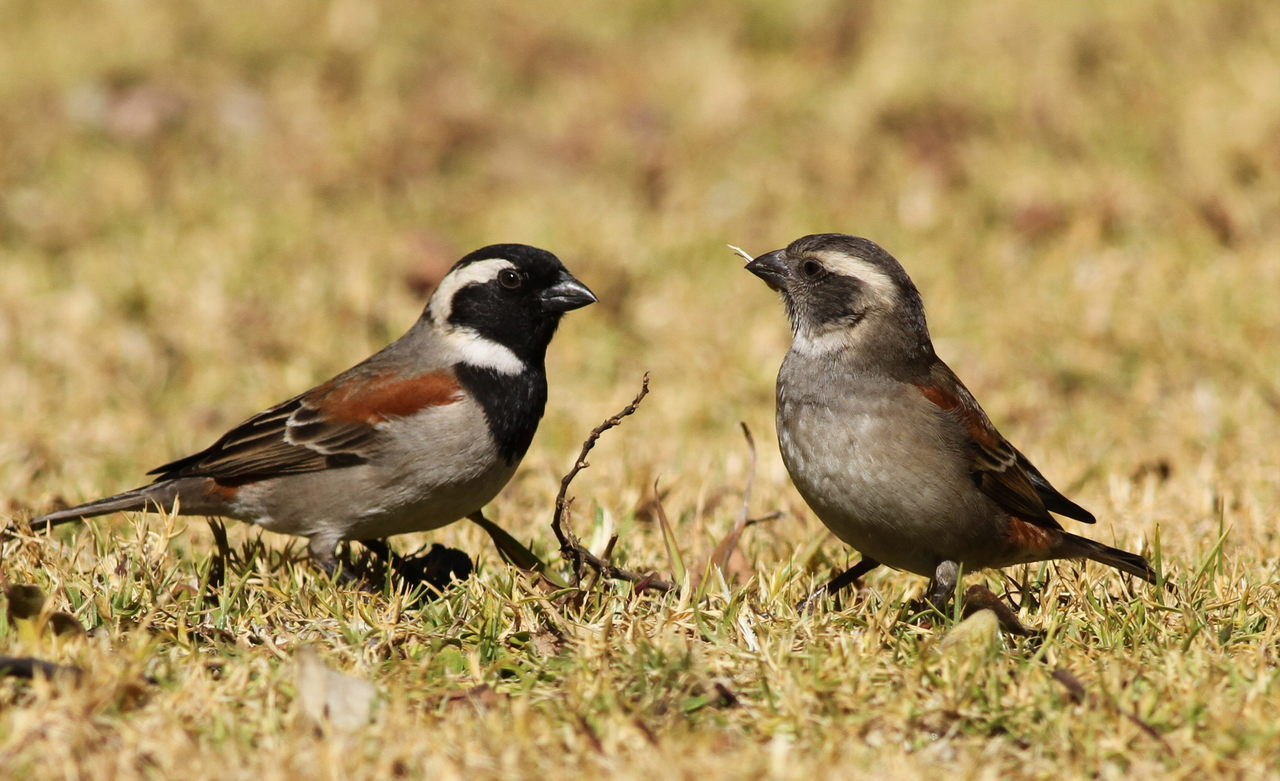
A pair in Johannesburg

The Cape sparrow usually breeds in loose colonies of 50–100 birds. 10 to 20 percent of the breeding birds in each population nest away from colonies, for unknown reasons. The Cape sparrow is usually monogamous, but some records of a male and two females nesting and raising young in one nest have been made in Western Cape. It seems pairs are formed in the non-breeding flocks, but it is not known how pairs are formed, or if the pair bond is for life. Once ready to breed, newly mated pairs look for a suitable nesting site, spending mornings searching, and returning to their flock in the afternoon. Once a site has been selected, both birds begin to build their nest. Other pairs seeking a nest site join them, and in this manner a colony forms quickly.

The courtship display is poorly recorded. Ornithologist J. Denis Summers-Smith observed a display in which the male hopped beside the female in a tree, drooping its wings and ruffling the chestnut-coloured feathers on its back. Groups of two or more males have been observed chasing a female. In the house sparrow a similar display exists, in which a female who is not ready to copulate is chased by her mate, who is joined by other males. It is not known if the display in the Cape sparrow has a similar significance. When ready to mate, the female crouches in solicitation and is mounted by the male. Instances of hybridisation with the house sparrow, the southern grey-headed sparrow, and captives or escapees of the Sudan golden sparrow have been reported.

==== Nesting ====
The Cape sparrow utilises a variety of nesting sites. Bushes and trees, especially acacias, seem to be preferred, and many nests may be built in a single tree. Holes and other covered sites are chosen less frequently. Nests have been recorded from the eaves of buildings, on creepers on walls, in holes in earth banks, and in holes in haystacks. Sometimes the Cape sparrow nests in the disused nests of other birds, such as weavers and swallows. Pairs that nest away from colonies usually choose low bushes or utility poles as nesting sites. Nests are placed at least a metre above the ground, and can be only a few centimetres apart in colonies. Only the nest and its very close vicinity are defended as a territory. Males defend their territory with threatening postures, and sometimes by fighting with bills on the ground.

Nests built in the open are large and untidy domed structures, built of dry grass, twigs, and other plant materials. Any leaves or thorns present in a tree may be worked into the nest. In cavity nests, the hole is filled with a shapeless mass of grass with a cup of soft material containing the eggs on the inside. When the disused domed nests of weavers are used, they are given a soft lining. The nest entrance is on the side, and is sometimes extended into a short funnel. The male and the female construct the nest together, keeping close when finding material and weaving it together. The inside linings of Cape sparrow nests can incorporate large portions of aromatic leaves such as wolbossie (Helichrysum pumilio), thyme (Thymus vulgaris), and camphor (Cinnamomum). This consistent use of aromatics suggests that they have some purpose such as protection against parasites.

==== Eggs and young ====
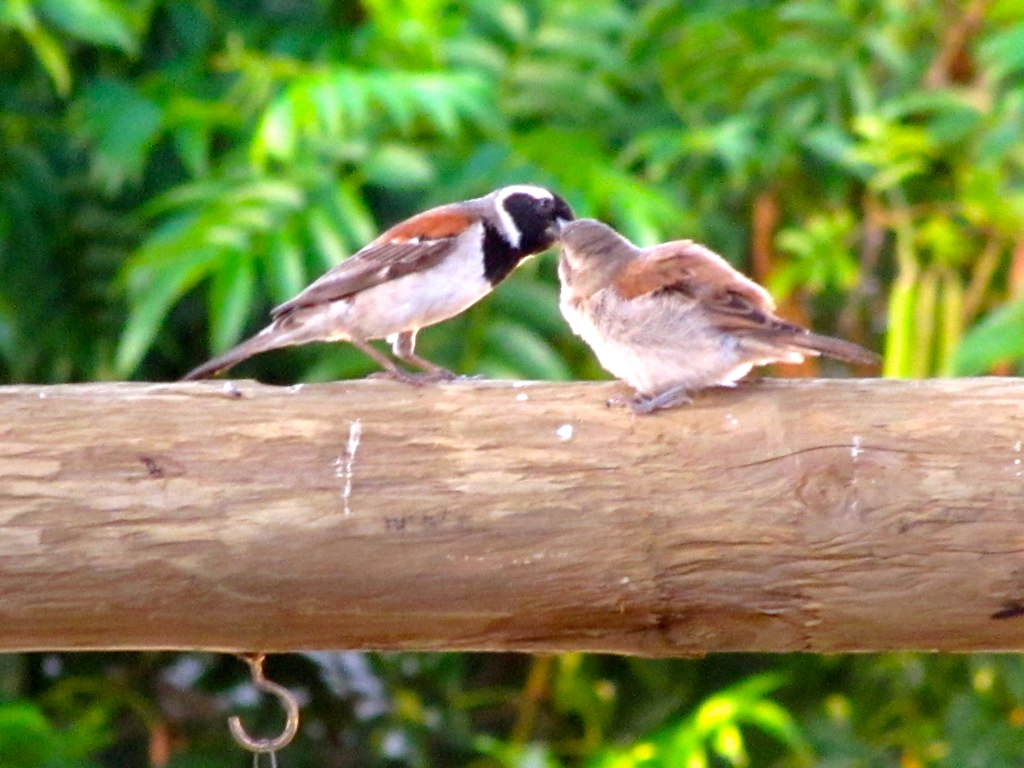
A male feeding a fledgeling

Clutches contain between two and six eggs, typically three or four. Variation in clutch size depends on the amount of food available for young birds. Presumably owing to the greater availability of food, clutches are larger during the peak of the breeding season, and in more southern latitudes of the Cape sparrow's range. Both birds of a pair incubate the eggs during the day, switching every ten or fifteen minutes. At night, only the female incubates the eggs, while the male roosts outside or in the nest. In pairs breeding outside of colonies, birds leave the nest to make room for their mates upon hearing their mates approaching. Among colonial pairs, the incubating bird waits until its partner arrives in the nest, to prevent other birds from entering the nest. Incubation seems to begin before the clutch is complete, and lasts 12–24 days.

The young of a clutch hatch over two or three days and are brooded until their feathers develop and eyes open five days after hatching. The young are fed on insects until they fledge 16 to 25, typically 17, days after hatching. After this they are fed for one or two weeks. While feeding nestlings, the female is dominant over the male. Cape sparrows are among the main hosts of brood parasitism by the dideric cuckoo in southern Africa, and sometimes parasitise nests of their own species.

== Relationships with humans ==
The Cape sparrow is an abundant and familiar bird of human habitations and cultivation in most of southern Africa. It is not believed to be threatened, and accordingly is listed as a species of least concern on the IUCN's Red List. It can be an agricultural pest, especially of grain cultivation and vineyards.

When vineyards in the south-west Cape started letting weeds grow between vines to conserve moisture, around 1956, the Cape sparrow moved in. Cape sparrows quickly exhausted the seeds and started eating the grapes. The Cape sparrow is now a serious pest in vineyards. Vineyards are not an optimal habitat, and some populations have had such a low reproductive success that they could not be maintained without immigration.

The Cape sparrow was featured on the lowest-denomination South African coin, from the farthing (¼-cent) in 1923 to the cent that ceased to be minted in 2002, with designs based on an original by George Kruger Gray. This was said to be because women interned at a concentration camp in Bethulie during the Boer War adopted a biblical quotation (from Matthew 10) as their motto: "Are not two sparrows sold for a farthing? and one of them shall not fall on the ground without your Father." It has also been featured on stamps from Lesotho and the Central African Republic.
