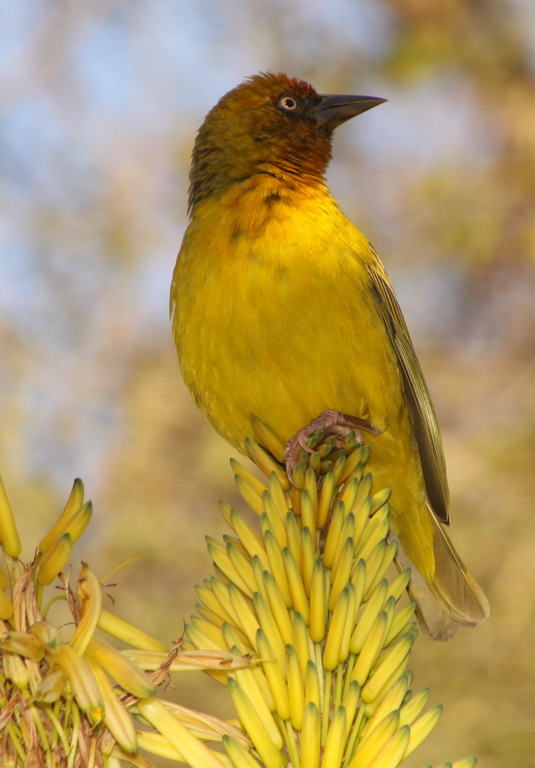
- Male in Johannesburg, South Africa

Conservation status
- Least Concern (IUCN 3.1)

Scientific classification
- Kingdom: Animalia
- Phylum: Chordata
- Class: Aves
- Order: Passeriformes
- Family: Ploceidae
- Genus: Ploceus
- Species: P. capensis

Binomial name
- Ploceus capensis (Linnaeus, 1766)

Synonyms
- Oriolus capensis Linnaeus, 1766

= Cape weaver =

Species of bird

The Cape weaver (Ploceus capensis) is a species of bird in the weaver family, Ploceidae, found in southern Africa.

== Taxonomy and systematics ==
In 1760 the French zoologist Mathurin Jacques Brisson included a description of the Cape weaver in his Ornithologie based on a specimen collected from the Cape of Good Hope. He used the French name Le carouge du Cap de Bonne Espérance and the Latin Xanthornus Capitis Bonae Spei. Although Brisson coined Latin names, these do not conform to the binomial system and are not recognised by the International Commission on Zoological Nomenclature. When in 1766 the Swedish naturalist Carl Linnaeus updated his Systema Naturae for the twelfth edition, he added 240 species that had been previously described by Brisson. One of these was the Cape weaver. Linnaeus included a brief description, coined the binomial name Oriolus capensis and cited Brisson's work. The specific name capensis denotes the Cape of Good Hope. This species is now placed in the genus Ploceus that was erected by the French naturalist Georges Cuvier in 1816. The species is monotypic.

== Description ==
The Cape weaver is a stocky 17 cm long bird with streaked olive-brown upperparts and a long pointed conical bill. The breeding male has a yellow head and underparts, an orange face, and a white iris. The adult female has an olive-yellow head and breast, shading to pale yellow on the lower belly. The female's eyes are brown, but 19% have pale eyes in summer and thus eye colour alone cannot be used to determine the sex. Young birds are similar to the female.

=== Vocalizations ===
The song of the Cape weaver is a harsh, rather hysterical sizzle. The alarm call is a sharp double chip and the contact call is a harsh "azwit".

== Distribution and habitat ==
The Cape weaver is endemic to South Africa, Lesotho and Eswatini, occurring across much of the area excluding the Kalahari Desert from the Orange River in the Northern Cape south to the Cape of Good Hope then east to northern KwaZulu Natal and inland almost to Bloemfontein in the Free State.

The Cape weaver occurs in open grassland, lowland fynbos, coastal thicket and farmland, so long as there is permanent water and trees. In the more arid, hotter regions it is restricted to upland areas and it never occurs in forest.

== Behaviour and ecology ==
When not breeding the Cape Weaver forms flocks, and it congregates in large roosts throughout the year, these may be shared with other birds, including other species of weavers. In some areas they desert the breeding colonies, returning at the commencement of the following breeding season. Anting has been observed and these birds bathe, even in rain or mist.

=== Breeding ===
The Cape weaver is a polygynous, territorial colonial nester, each male may have up to 7 females in a single breeding season. The males normally form colonies of between 2 and 20 males. Each male builds multiple nests within a small territory, which he vigorously defends against other males. Females test the quality of the construction of the nest by pulling at material on the interior; if it is acceptable the female adopts a hunched posture to indicate her readiness to mate. The nest is built by the male in about a week, and is a kidney-shaped, fully waterproof construction made of broad strips of grass or reeds that are woven together. Once a female accepts the nest the male builds an entrance tunnel at its base, while she lines the inside of the nest with fine grass and feathers. The nest is usually attached to the tip of a tree branch, often exotic species such as eucalyptus or willow or it is built in tall wetland vegetation such as reeds Phragmites or reedmace Typha capensis, on utility lines or on fences overlooking water.

It lays a clutch of 2–5 eggs. Eggs are laid in June–February with a peak in October to January in summer rainfall areas and August–October in the winter rainfall zone of the Western Cape. The eggs are incubated by the female for about two weeks. After they hatch, she broods for the first few nights, after which she roosts in an adjacent unused nest. At first, the chicks are fed by the females, but when they are older the males take up a greater role in providing food. The young fledge at about 17 days old.

The Cape weaver is subjected to brood parasitism by the diederik cuckoo. The nests are sometimes heavily infested with parasites such as mites, and the fledglings can be parasitised by ticks. Disused nests may be reused by Cape sparrows and African dusky flycatchers.

=== Feeding ===
The Cape weaver is omnivorous with a diet that is evenly divided between animal and plant matter, particularly seeds, fruit and nectar. It forages in a variety of ways on the ground, in tree foliage, gleaning food from bark and hawking insects in the air. Its relatively long bill is adapted to feeding on a wide variety of food items and there is a long list of items that this species has been recorded as eating, including various insects, spiders, seeds, nectar, and fruit. The females appear to enjoy a more varied diet than the males. Cape weavers are generalist nectar-feeders and in South Africa they are the major pollinators of aloes.

== Status ==
The Cape weaver is not threatened; in fact, it is common and can be a pest in the orchards and agricultural lands of the Western Cape, where it is occasionally killed in large numbers.

== Gallery ==
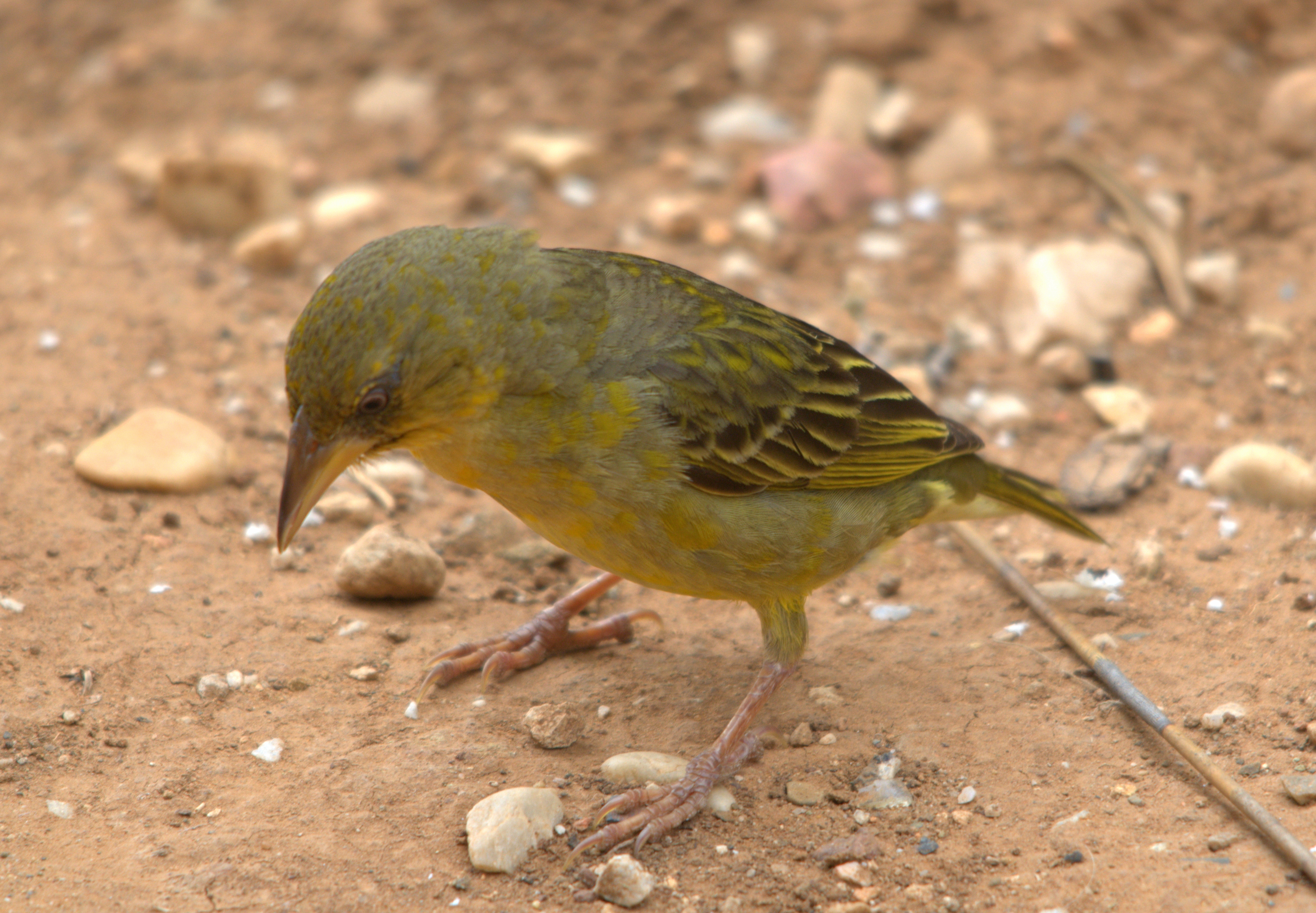
Cape weaver female in Addo Elephant National Park, South Africa

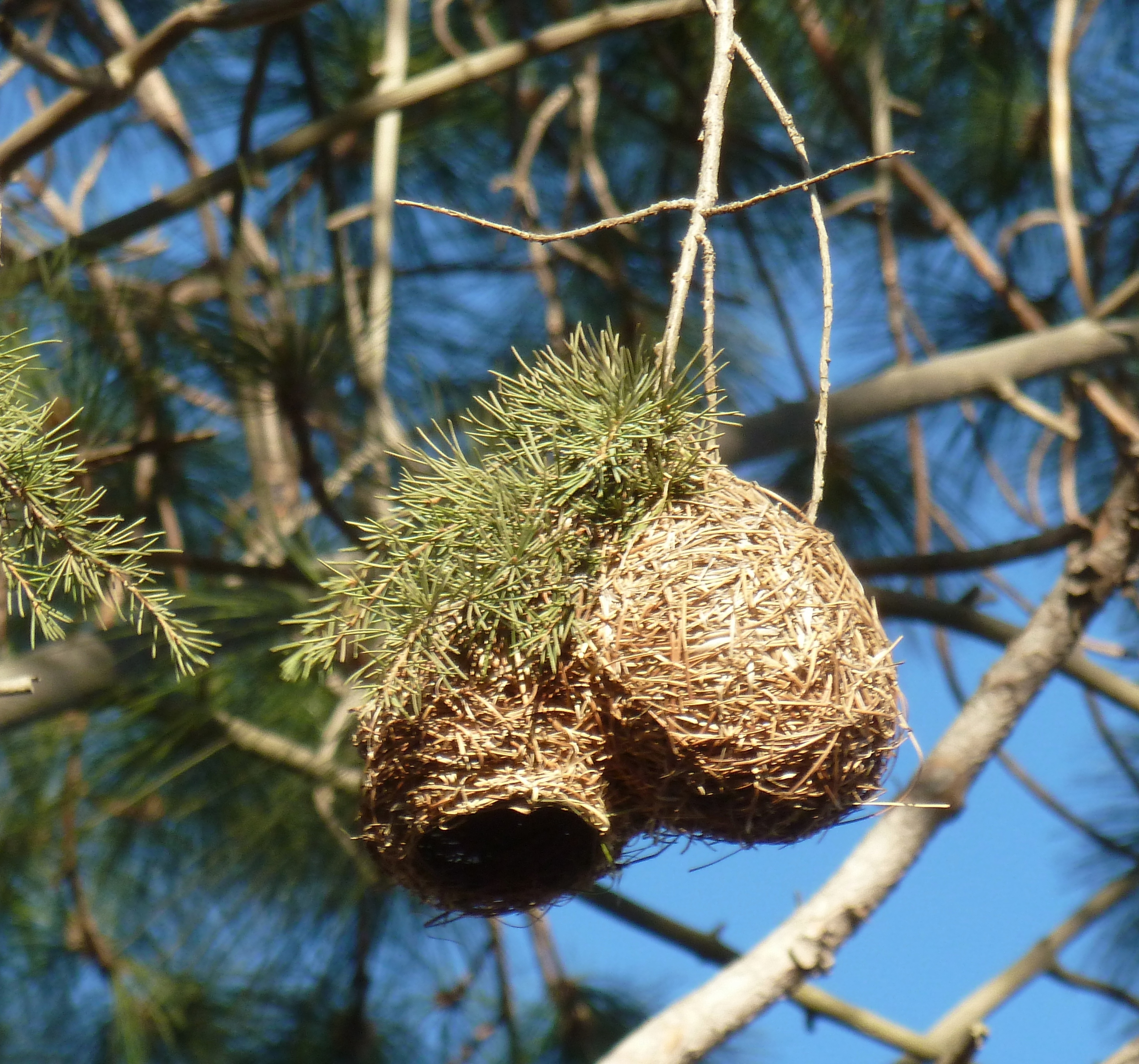
A nest built of pine needles, at Harrismith, Free State

Cape weavers building nests in Goodwood, Cape Town (video)
