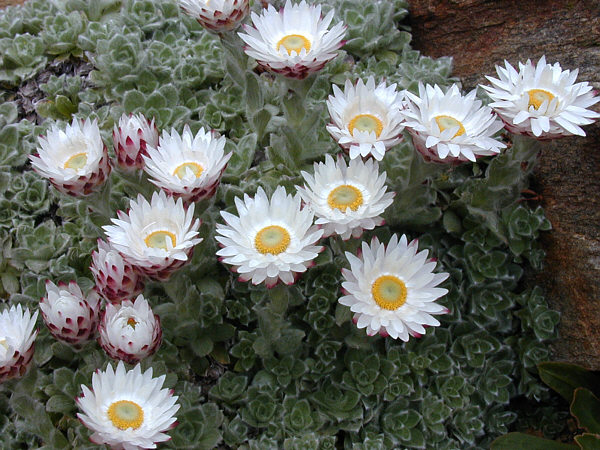

Scientific classification
- Kingdom: Plantae
- Clade: Tracheophytes
- Clade: Angiosperms
- Clade: Eudicots
- Clade: Asterids
- Order: Asterales
- Family: Asteraceae
- Genus: Helichrysum
- Species: H. milfordiae

Binomial name
- Helichrysum milfordiae Killick

= Helichrysum milfordiae =

Species of flowering plant

Helichrysum milfordiae, the Milford everlasting, is a species of flowering plant in the family Asteraceae, native to South Africa. Growing to 10 cm (3.9 in) high by 50 cm (20 in) wide, it is a mat-forming evergreen perennial with silver-grey leaves arranged in tight rosettes, producing solitary daisy-like flowers in spring. The white flower bracts have pink undersides which are prominent in bud.

In cultivation this plant is hardy down to −10 °C (14 °F) but requires the sharp drainage and dry winters of its native habitat, on scree slopes above 2,800 m (9,200 ft) in the Drakensberg of Natal and Lesotho. It is suitable for cultivation in an Alpine garden or similar, with neutral or alkaline soil. In the UK it has gained the Royal Horticultural Society's Award of Garden Merit.
