= Helichrysum sphaeroideum =

Scientific classification
- Kingdom: Plantae
- Clade: Tracheophytes
- Clade: Angiosperms
- Clade: Eudicots
- Clade: Asterids
- Order: Asterales
- Family: Asteraceae
- Genus: Helichrysum
- Species: H. sphaeroideum

Binomial name
- Helichrysum sphaeroideum Moeser (1910)

South African plant species

Helichrysum sphaeroideum is a species of flowering plant in family Asteraceae. It is native to the Cape Provinces of South Africa.

== Description ==
This straggling subshrub grow to be up to 60 cm (24 in) tall. Slender branches grow from the base and often tangle together. They are covered with thin, white felt-like hairs. The leaves are oval or elongated ovals. They are white felted beneath and hairless above.

Flowers are most common in December and January, but may be present between September and February. The flower heads are disc shaped with few to many growing in dense terminal clusters. The inner bracts spread above the white flowers. The tips of the petals way be tinged reddish or pink. Each flower has eight to thirty florets. The ovaries are hairy.

== Distribution and habitat ==
This species grows on the Cape mountains of South Africa. It ranges from Tulbagh and Paarl to Groot Swartberg, north of Calitzdorp. It prefers damp sandstone slopes, usually growing in more sheltered areas such as gullies and ravines.

== Conservation ==
This species is considered to be of least concern by the South African National Biodiversity Institute.
