= Helichrysum artvinense =

Conservation status
- Critically Imperiled (NatureServe)

Scientific classification
- Kingdom: Plantae
- Clade: Tracheophytes
- Clade: Angiosperms
- Clade: Eudicots
- Clade: Asterids
- Order: Asterales
- Family: Asteraceae
- Genus: Helichrysum
- Species: H. artvinense

Binomial name
- Helichrysum artvinense P.H.Davis & Kupicha

Species of plant

Helichrysum artvinense, the Artvinian everlasting, is a herbaceous plant, a member of the family Asteraceae.

== Distribution ==
It is a native species to Turkey.

== Taxonomy ==
It was named by Peter Hadland Davis and Frances Kristina Kupicha, in Not. Roy. Bot. Gard. Edinb. 33: 240, in 1974. This name is unresolved.
