= Helichrysum biafranum =

Conservation status
- Vulnerable (IUCN 2.3)

Scientific classification
- Kingdom: Plantae
- Clade: Tracheophytes
- Clade: Angiosperms
- Clade: Eudicots
- Clade: Asterids
- Order: Asterales
- Family: Asteraceae
- Genus: Helichrysum
- Species: H. biafranum

Binomial name
- Helichrysum biafranum Hook.f.

Species of flowering plant

Helichrysum biafranum is a species of flowering plant in the family Asteraceae. It is found only in Cameroon. Its natural habitat is subtropical or tropical dry forests.
