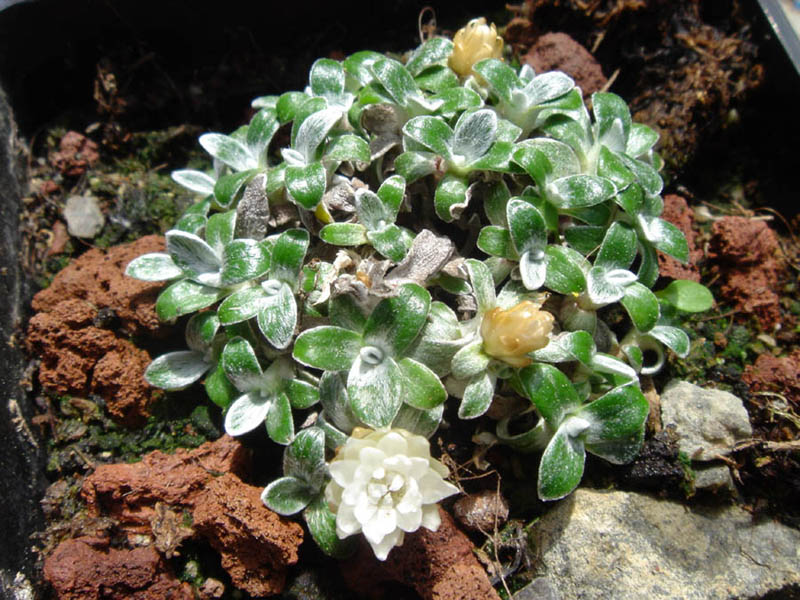

Scientific classification
- Kingdom: Plantae
- Clade: Tracheophytes
- Clade: Angiosperms
- Clade: Eudicots
- Clade: Asterids
- Order: Asterales
- Family: Asteraceae
- Genus: Helichrysum
- Species: H. sessilioides

Binomial name
- Helichrysum sessilioides Hilliard, 1973

Synonyms
- Bryomorphe aretioides Druce; Helichrysum aretioides (Druce) Thell.

= Helichrysum sessilioides =

Species of forb from South Africa

Helichrysum sessilioides is a forb species from Southern Africa.

== Description ==
The many branches of this dwarf shrub form a round and compact cushion. The old stems become woody and gnarled. The branches are densely tufted and leafy. The linear or elongated oval leaves are closely overlapping, forming a rosette when viewed from above. The upper layer is smooth and covered with a hairy layer, making them green with a silvery sheen. They become silvery grey when dry. They are white felted below.

All of the yellow flowers in each of the bell-shaped flower heads are of the same sex. They are solitary at the ends of branchlets. Each has eight to twelve rows of closely overlapping bracts and are longer than the flowers. The outermost bracts are pale brown or pink to red, while the inner ones are white or pale pink.

== Distribution and habitat ==
This plant is found growing on mountains in Lesotho and South Africa. In Lesotho, it is most common in areas that experience an intermediate level of grazing by livestock - while heavy grazing is bad for survival as it presumably gets eaten too, it seems that this species is more easily outcompeted at low levels of grazing and occurs at lower densities.
