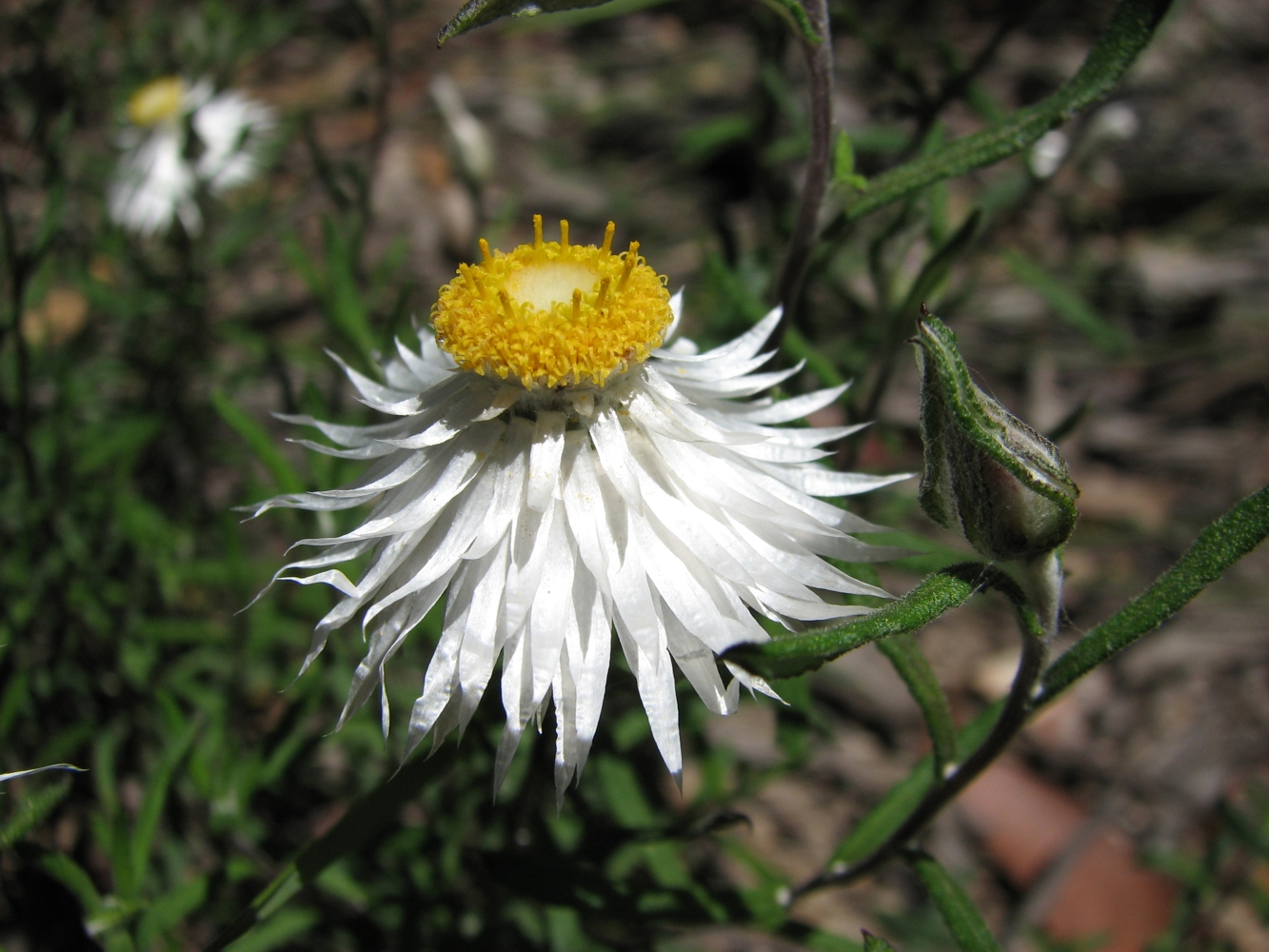
- Helichrysum leucopsideum near Walhalla, Victoria

Scientific classification
- Kingdom: Plantae
- Clade: Tracheophytes
- Clade: Angiosperms
- Clade: Eudicots
- Clade: Asterids
- Order: Asterales
- Family: Asteraceae
- Genus: Helichrysum
- Species: H. leucopsideum

Binomial name
- Helichrysum leucopsideum DC.

Synonyms
- Gnaphalium leucopsideum Labill.

= Helichrysum leucopsideum =

Satin everlasting

Species of plant

Helichrysum leucopsideum, commonly known as satin everlasting, is a flowering, perennial herb in the family Asteraceae. It is grows in all states of Australia except Queensland and the Northern Territory. It has white, terminal flower heads and narrow, woolly leaves.

== Description ==
Helichrysum leucopsideum is an upright, spreading perennial herb 15–50 cm (5.9–19.7 in) high, stems with occasional or thickly woolly glandular hairs. The leaves are narrowly oblong to linear, 1.5–5 cm (0.59–1.97 in) long, 1–10 mm (0.039–0.394 in) wide, blunt to acute and ending with a sharp point. The upper surface green, rough, hairless or with a few scattered glandular hairs. The lower surface grey or white, densely woolly and the margins rolled under or wavy. The flower heads are mostly single or 2-3 in corymbs, 2–3.5 cm (0.79–1.38 in) in diameter and the bracts are arranged in rows of about 10, white, sometimes pinkish in bud, wooly toward the base, folding back toward the stem as the flower matures, florets are yellow and numerous. Flowering occurs mostly in spring and summer and the fruit is cypsela 2–3 mm (0.079–0.118 in) long, smooth, brown and bristly.

== Taxonomy and naming ==
Helichrysum leucopsideum was first formally described in 1838 by Augustin Pyramus de Candolle and the description was published in Prodromus Systematis Naturalis Regni Vegetabilis. The specific epithet (leucopsideum) refers to the white bracts surrounding the disc florets.

== Distribution and habitat ==
Satin everlasting grows in a variety of habitats including sand, open forests, coastal scrub to sub-alpine locations in Western Australia, South Australia, Victoria, Tasmania and New South Wales.
