= Helichrysum pumilum =

Scientific classification
- Kingdom: Plantae
- Clade: Tracheophytes
- Clade: Angiosperms
- Clade: Eudicots
- Clade: Asterids
- Order: Asterales
- Family: Asteraceae
- Genus: Helichrysum
- Species: H. pumilum

Binomial name
- Helichrysum pumilum Hook.F
- Recorded occurrence of H.pumilum from the Atlas of Living Australia (ALA)

Synonyms
- Achyrocline pumila Klatt; Helichrysum pumilum Moeser

Species of flowering plant

Helichrysum pumilum, commonly known as dwarf everlasting, is a rosette herb from the family Asteraceae. It is endemic to Tasmania, where it is commonly found in the West and Southwest of the island state. It is distinctive by its inflorescence, with the flower stalk being densely matted in fine white hairs and the daisy-like flower head having numerous pink or white ray floret-like bracts.

== Description ==
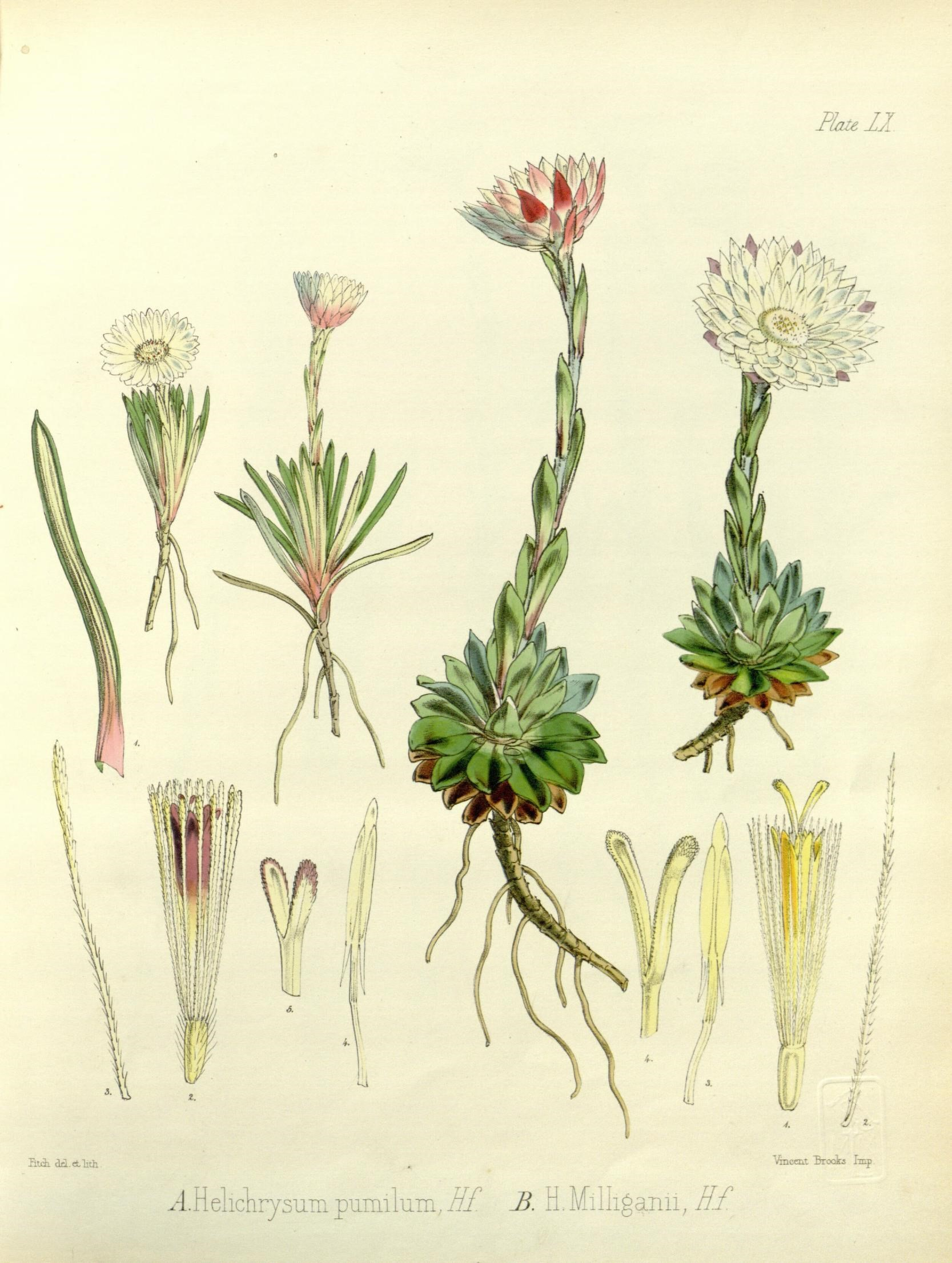
Original illustration of Helichrysum pumilum (left) alongside H.milliganii (right) by Joseph Dalton Hooker.

Flower head

Helichrysum pumilum grows as a low tufted, perennial herb reaching around 10 cm tall. Leaves are linear to spathulate in shape, 15-50mm long and 1-5mm wide with revolute margins. They are grouped in a rosette and arise from the base of the plant. The variety spathulatum has shorter, more spathulate leaves, whilst the leaves of var.pumilum are longer and more linear. Arising from the basally sheathing leaves is an inflorescence containing a white, woolly scape with few leaf-like bracts, 20-100mm long. Forming a rosette around the flower head are elliptic to linear shaped bracts, or phyllaries, resembling the look of ray florets. Outer bracts mostly white in colour but can be streaked with pink, inner bracts are white or pink. The florets are in the form of corolla tubes in the pseudanthium, they are numerous and pink to purple in colour. Flowers in Summer, between December and February.

This plant can be mistaken for Celmisia saxifraga but the heads lack ray florets and the leaves are not silvery and hairy above.

== Taxonomy ==
Helichrysum pumilum was originally described by Joseph Dalton Hooker in his book from the Ross expedition named 'The Botany of the Antarctic Voyage of H.M Discovery Ships Erebus and Terror, in the Years 1839-1843, Under the Command of Captain Sir James Clark Ross. Part III. In his original description, Hooker noted H.pumilum as the smallest of the Helichrysum species and described the possible existence of a broader leaved form of the plant, which he called var β. A.M Buchanan later recognized this different form as distinct at the variant level, designating it the name Helichrysum pumilum var.spathulatum.

== Distribution and habitat ==
Endemic to Tasmania, Helichrysum pumilum grows mostly in the West and Southwest of the state. Seemingly rare sightings have been recorded in the East of the state. The range of H. somalense extends from buttongrass plains to sub-alpine areas, even to the slopes or summits of mountain ranges. The originally described variety, somalense, is mostly confined to the low nutrient, peaty soils of buttongrass plains, occasionally creeping into sub-alpine areas. The variety described by A.M Buchanan, spathulatum, is more confined to the mountainous alpine areas of the West and Southwest, growing in shallow, skeletal soils.

== Ecology ==
Along with various other seeds and flowers of low moorland or sedge-land plains, Helichrysum pumilum is an important food source for the critically endangered Orange-bellied parrot. This small, migratory parrot feasts on the flowers of H. pumilum towards the end of their breeding season, between late summer and early autumn.
