= Helichrysum mollifolium =

Scientific classification
- Kingdom: Plantae
- Clade: Tracheophytes
- Clade: Angiosperms
- Clade: Eudicots
- Clade: Asterids
- Order: Asterales
- Family: Asteraceae
- Genus: Helichrysum
- Species: H. mollifolium

Binomial name
- Helichrysum mollifolium Hilliard

South African plant species

Helichrysum mollifolium is a species of plant from South Africa.

== Description ==
This plant has a terminal flowering stem with long white hairs. There are reduced leaves at the base. The small flowerheads are aggregated into a doubly compound inflorescence. The stems bearing the flowers are clearly visible. The flower bracts are golden brown. It has a small root stock which produces narrow, rhizomes.

=== Similar species ===
It can be distinguished from Helichrysum nudifolium by the soft leaves crowded at the base of the stem and the more golden-brown flower bracts.

It differs from Helichrysum miconiifolium in its soft flowering stem, five nerved leaves and blunt bracts around the flowers.

== Distribution and habitat ==
This plant is known from the KwaZulu Natal province of South Africa. It grows in moist areas in the Drakensberg, between Witsieshoek and Garden Castle. Its habitats include grassy depressions, near streams and the damp margins of forests.

== Conservation ==
As this species is widespread and currently well protected it is considered to be of least concern by the South African National Biodiversity Institute.
