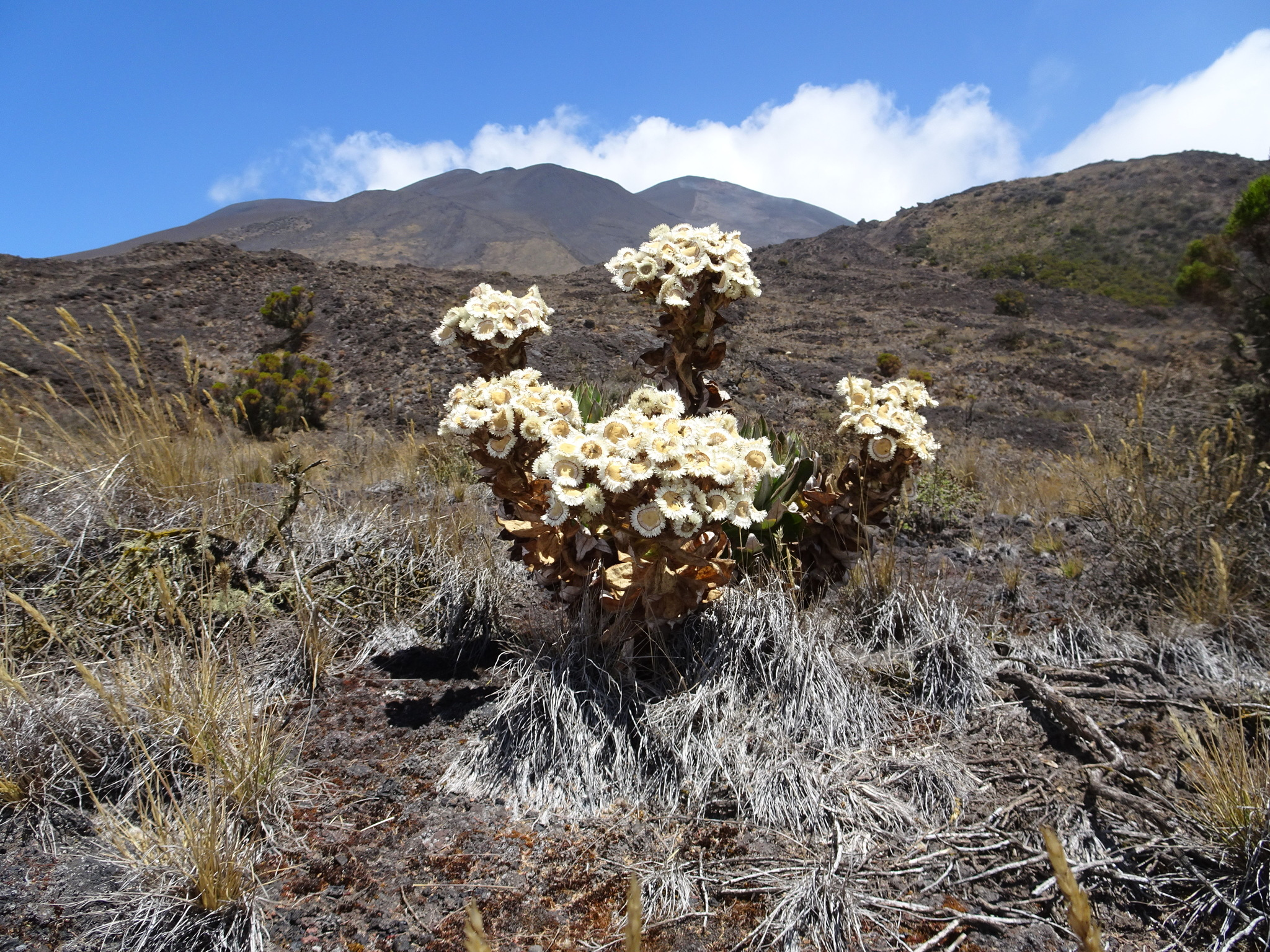

Conservation status
- Near Threatened (IUCN 2.3)

Scientific classification
- Kingdom: Plantae
- Clade: Tracheophytes
- Clade: Angiosperms
- Clade: Eudicots
- Clade: Asterids
- Order: Asterales
- Family: Asteraceae
- Genus: Helichrysum
- Species: H. mannii

Binomial name
- Helichrysum mannii Hook.f.

= Helichrysum mannii =

Species of flowering plant

Helichrysum mannii is a species of flowering plant in the family Asteraceae. It is found in Cameroon and Equatorial Guinea. Its natural habitat is subtropical or tropical dry lowland grassland.
