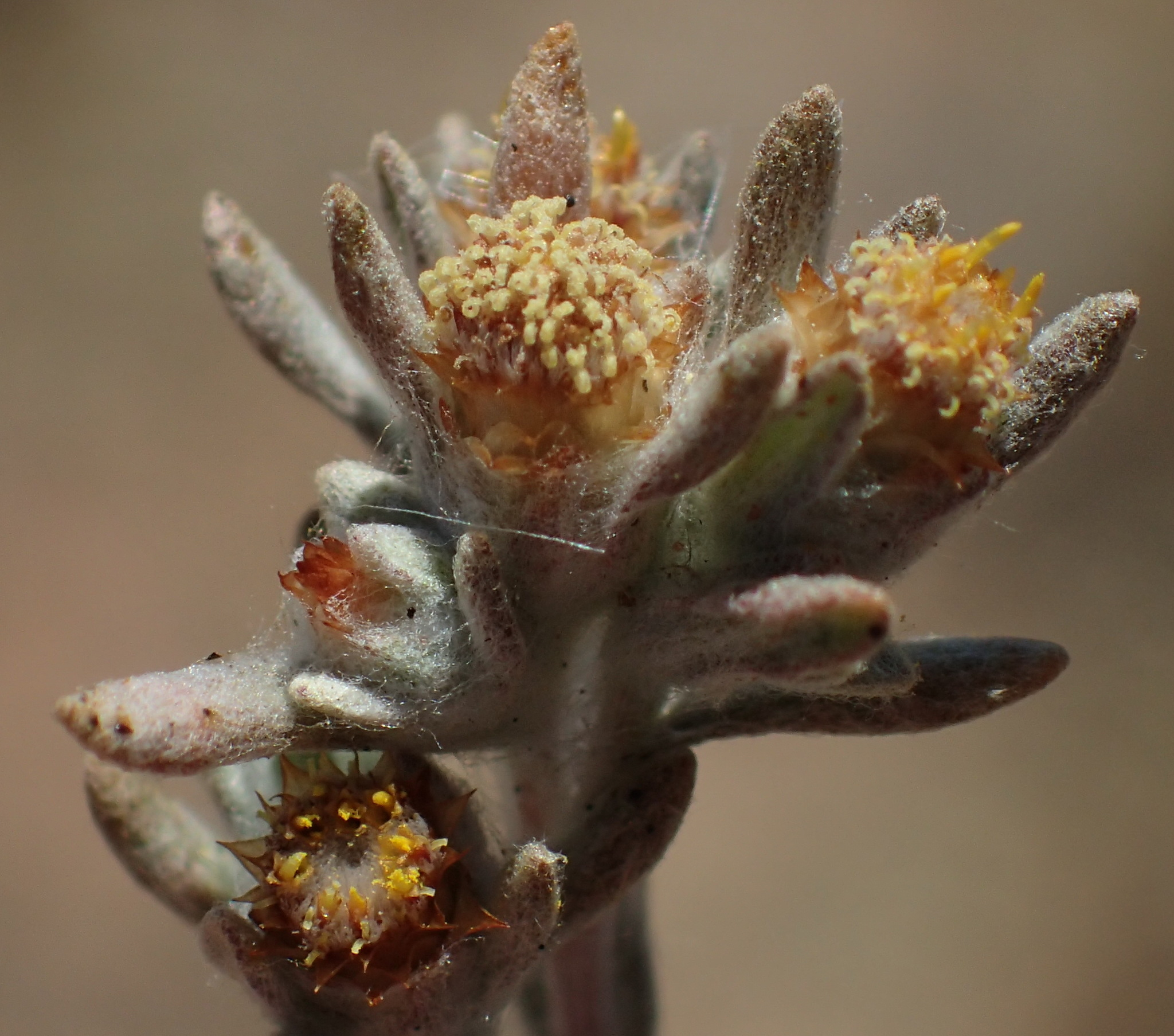

Scientific classification
- Kingdom: Plantae
- Clade: Tracheophytes
- Clade: Angiosperms
- Clade: Eudicots
- Clade: Asterids
- Order: Asterales
- Family: Asteraceae
- Genus: Helichrysum
- Species: H. pumilio

Binomial name
- Helichrysum pumilio Hilliard & B.L.Burtt

Synonyms
- Leontonyx pumilio O.Hoffm. (1898)

= Helichrysum pumilio =

Species of flowering plant

Helichrysum pumilio is a species of flowering plant in the family Asteraceae, known colloquially as the wolbossie. It is a subshrub native to the Cape Provinces and Free State of South Africa. An aromatic, it is used by birds such as the Cape sparrow in their nests, possibly as protection against parasites.

Two subspecies are accepted:

- Helichrysum pumilio subsp. fleckii (S.Moore) Hilliard
- Helichrysum pumilio subsp. pumilio
