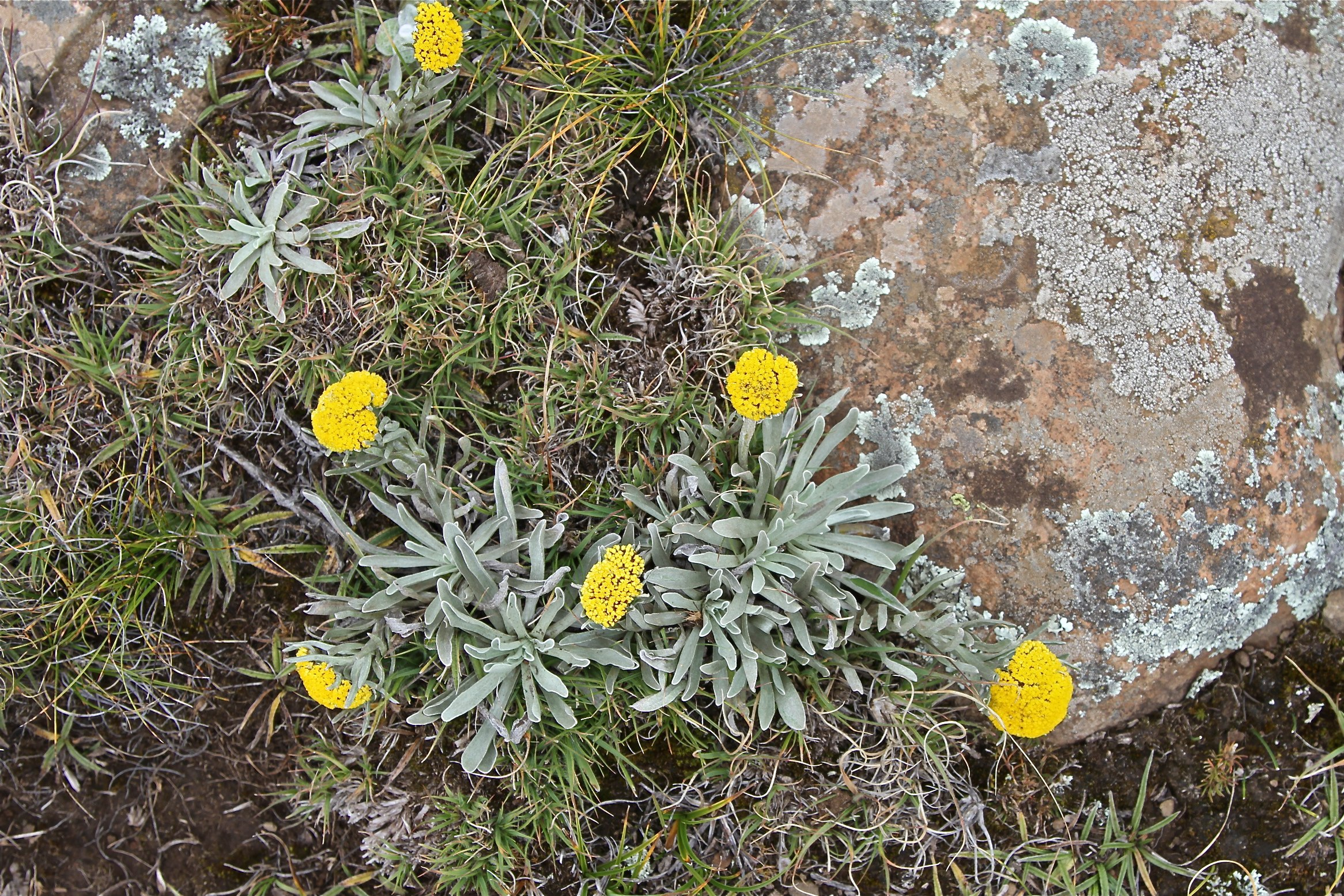

Scientific classification
- Kingdom: Plantae
- Clade: Tracheophytes
- Clade: Angiosperms
- Clade: Eudicots
- Clade: Asterids
- Order: Asterales
- Family: Asteraceae
- Genus: Helichrysum
- Species: H. subglomeratum

Binomial name
- Helichrysum subglomeratum Less.

= Helichrysum subglomeratum =

Species of plant

Helichrysum subglomeratum is a plant from southern and tropical Africa.

== Description ==
This perennial herb grows 8–60 cm (3.1–23.6 in) tall. The rootstock is woody. The leaves form a rosette at the base and sometimes also higher up the stem. The leaves growing at the base are the largest. They are oblanceolate in shape and are silvery and silky. Dense, many flowered flower heads are present between March and June. The flowers grow in cylindrical cymes located at the ends of branches. The outer parts of the flowers are brown or straw coloured and the insides are tipped with bright yellow.

== Distribution and habitat ==
This plant is found growing between South Africa and the Okavango. It is found in the following countries: Angola, Lesotho, Namibia, South Africa, Zambia and Zimbabwe. It grows scattered across rocky grasslands, although it will sometimes form mats on rocky sheets.

== Uses ==
In traditional medicine, the plant has been smoked to treat headaches.
