= Helichrysum ephelos =

Scientific classification
- Kingdom: Plantae
- Clade: Embryophytes
- Clade: Tracheophytes
- Clade: Angiosperms
- Clade: Eudicots
- Clade: Asterids
- Order: Asterales
- Family: Asteraceae
- Genus: Helichrysum
- Species: H. ephelos

Binomial name
- Helichrysum ephelos Hillard

Species of plant

Helichrysum ephelos is a species of plant from South Africa.

== Description ==
The stems of this mat-forming perennial grow from a stolon that roots and branches freely. It produces multiple rosettes of leaves. The tops of the leaves are covered with short white hairs and the bottoms with felt-like silky hairs. Only the tips are free. Flowers, which are present between February and May, are webbed together at the ends of branches. The outer tips of the branches are light brown and the inner tips yellow.

== Distribution and habitat ==
This plant is known only from the KwaZulu Natal province in South Africa. It grows on earth banks and tussocks at wetlands and the marshy sources of streams on the Fort Nottingham Commonage and the top of Insizwa Mountain.

== Conservation ==
Helichrysum ephelos is considered to be rare by the South African National Biodiversity Institute. While it has no immediate threats, this species is a habitat specialist known from only six sites.
