= Helichrysum cameroonense =

Conservation status
- Near Threatened (IUCN 2.3)

Scientific classification
- Kingdom: Plantae
- Clade: Tracheophytes
- Clade: Angiosperms
- Clade: Eudicots
- Clade: Asterids
- Order: Asterales
- Family: Asteraceae
- Genus: Helichrysum
- Species: H. cameroonense

Binomial name
- Helichrysum cameroonense Hutch. & Dalziel

Species of flowering plant

Helichrysum cameroonense is a species of flowering plant in the family Asteraceae. It is found only in Cameroon. Its natural habitat is subtropical or tropical dry lowland grassland.
