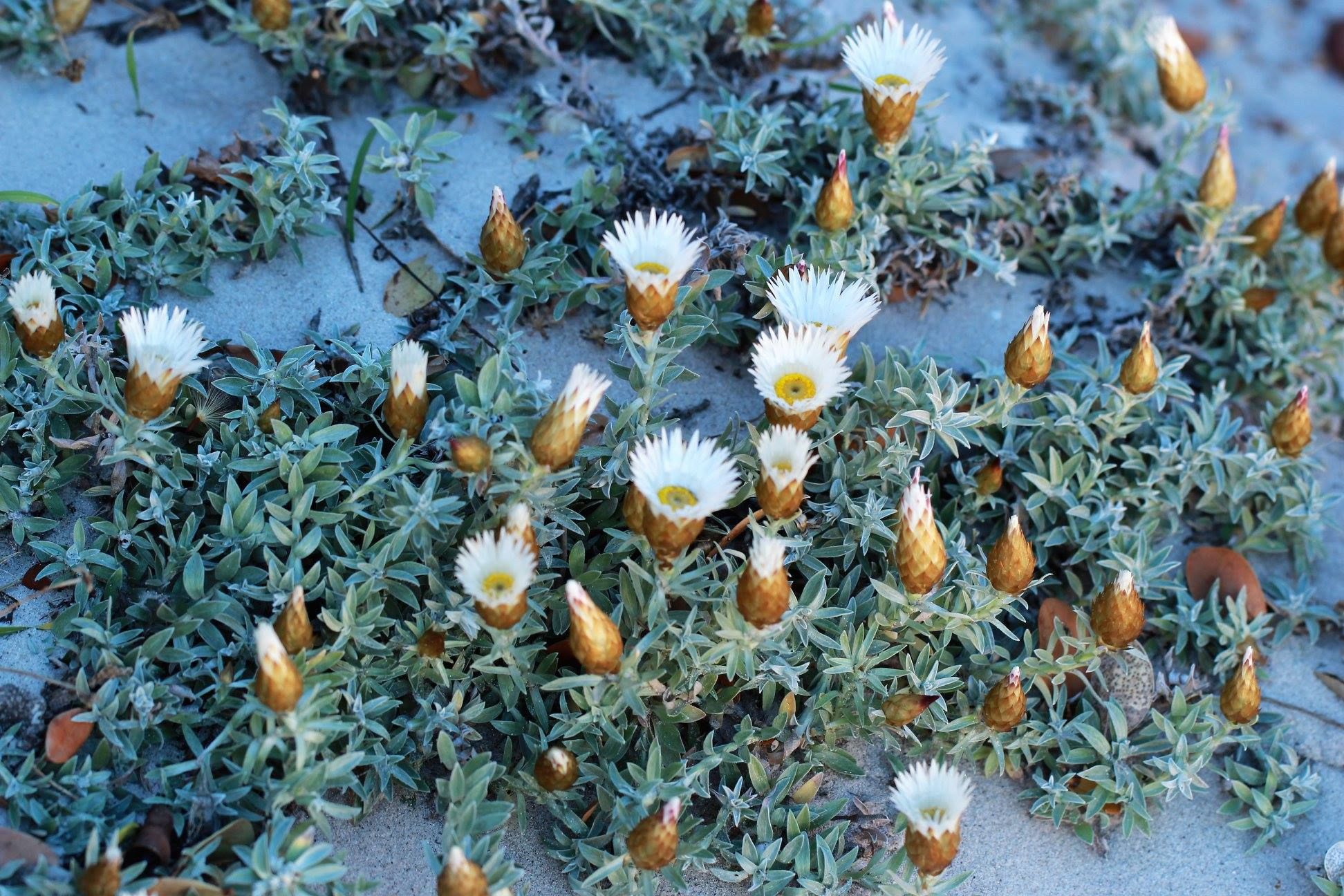

Scientific classification
- Kingdom: Plantae
- Clade: Tracheophytes
- Clade: Angiosperms
- Clade: Eudicots
- Clade: Asterids
- Order: Asterales
- Family: Asteraceae
- Genus: Helichrysum
- Species: H. retortum

Binomial name
- Helichrysum retortum (L.) Willd.

Synonyms
- Argyrocome retorta (L.) Gaertn.; Astelma retorta (L.) D.Don; Astelma retorta (L.) D.Don ex Sw.; Astelma retorta (L.) D.Don ex Sweet; Gnaphalium retortum (L.) Sch.Bip.; Helichrysum argenteum Schrank; Helichrysum radicans (Thunb.) Willd.; Helichrysum retortum var. retortum; Xeranthemum polyfolium Crantz; Xeranthemum radicans Thunb.; Xeranthemum retortum L.

= Helichrysum retortum =

South African plant species

Helichrysum retortum, the flask everlasting or sea strawflower, is a species of plant from South Africa.

== Description ==
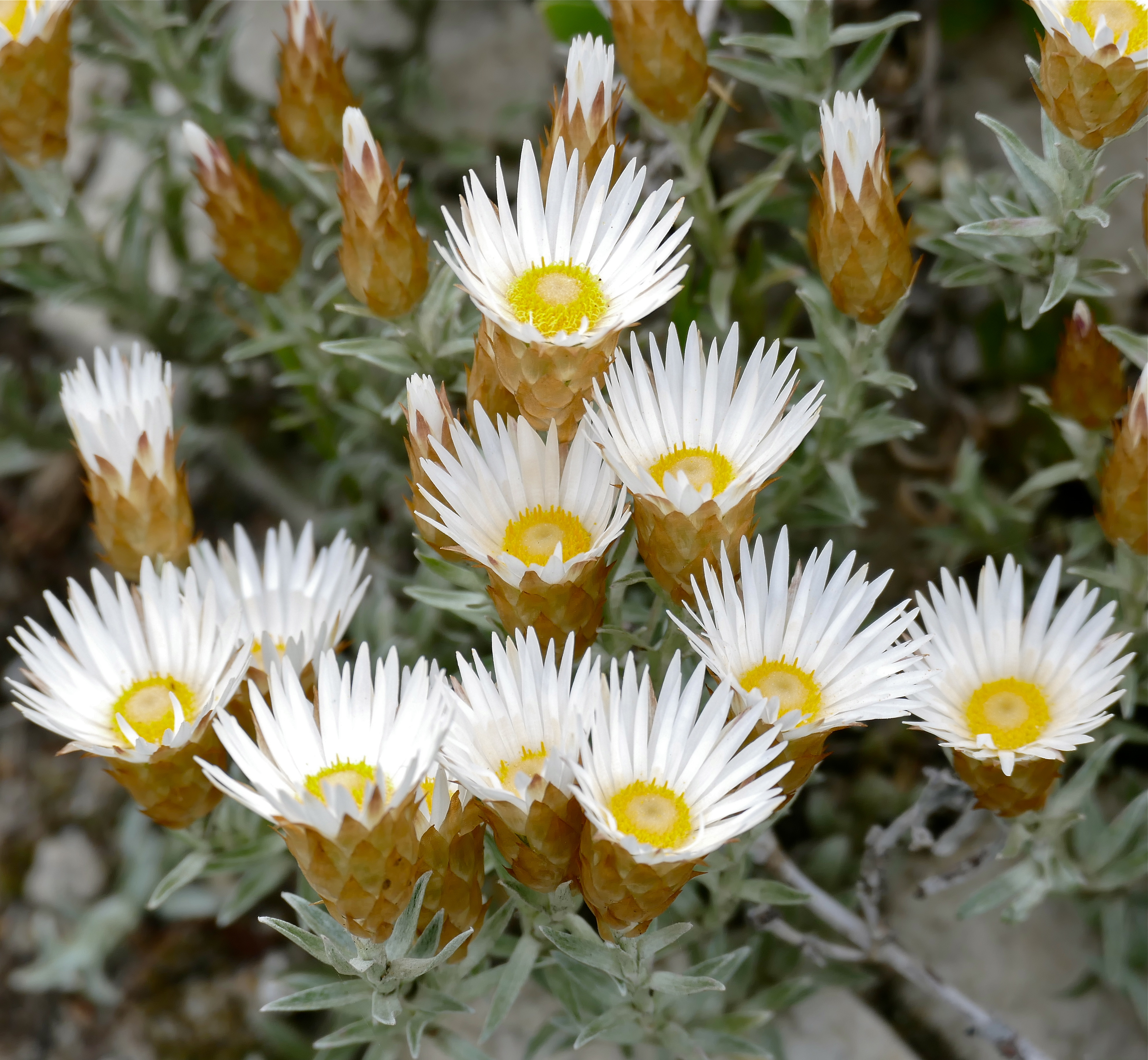
Close up showing the flowers surrounded by bracts

This straggling silvery shrublet grows up to 50 cm (20 in) tall, although the stems may be longer. The overlapping leaves grow close to the stem. They are oblong and the upper leaves are folded and hooked. They are covered in tissue paper-like hairs, making them a silvery colour.

Papery flowers are present between August and December. The terminal disc shaped flower heads are nested in leaves and surrounded by white, glossy bracts that are brown or pink on the outside. The flowers have a diameter of about 4 cm (1.6 in). The ray florets are shiny white in colour and are often flushed with brown and pink. The disc florets are yellow in colour.

== Distribution and habitat ==
This plant is always found growing near the sea. It is found growing on sand cliffs, sand dunes and sandy slopes and flats along the southwest coast of South Africa, from Blouberg to the north of Table Bay and Stillbaai. It sometimes grows up between neighboring bushes.

== Conservation ==
While this species has lost some of its habitat to urban development, it is still considered to be common and is listed as being of least concern by the South African National Biodiversity Institute.
