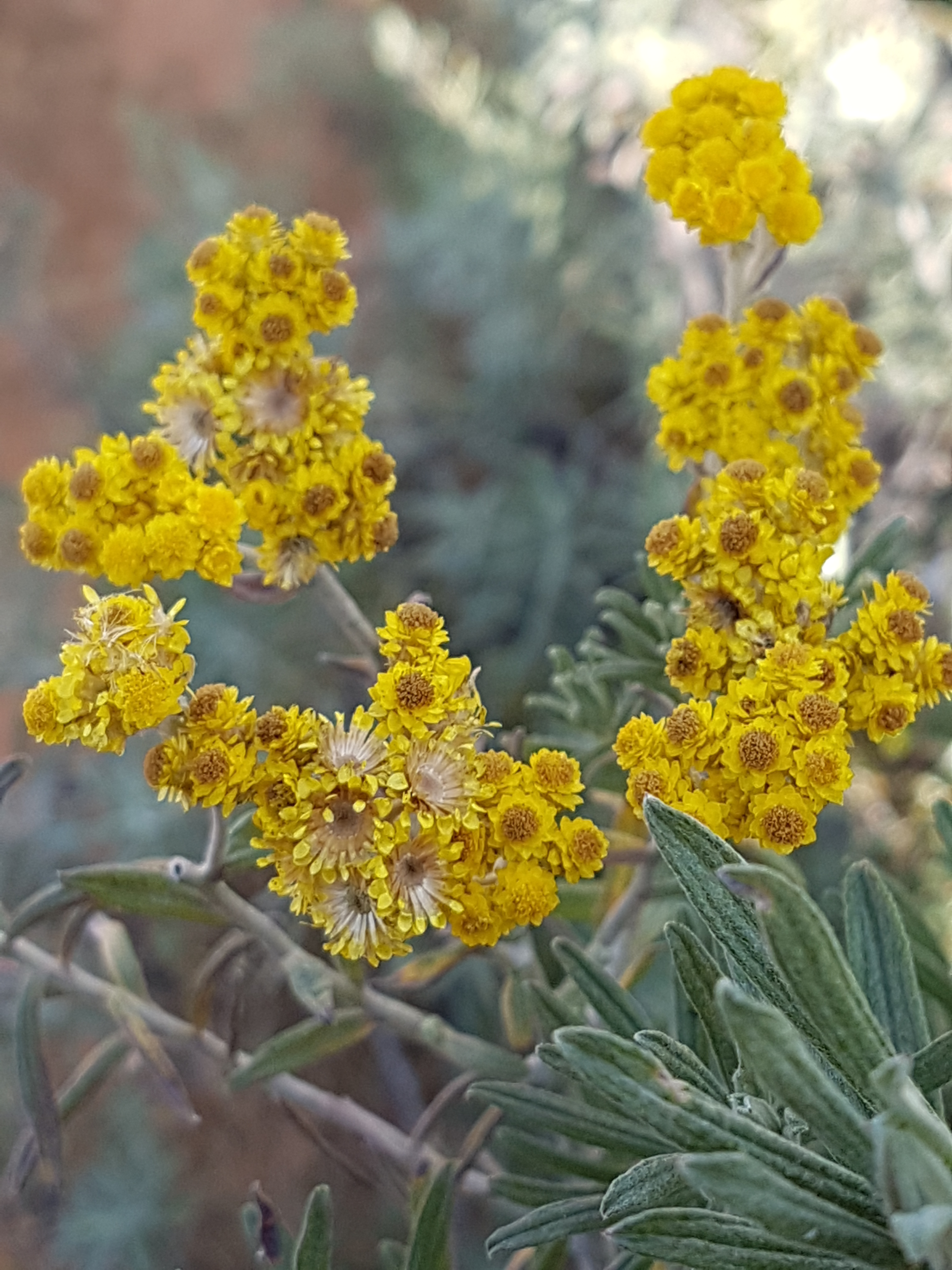

Scientific classification
- Kingdom: Plantae
- Clade: Tracheophytes
- Clade: Angiosperms
- Clade: Eudicots
- Clade: Asterids
- Order: Asterales
- Family: Asteraceae
- Genus: Helichrysum
- Species: H. splendidum

Binomial name
- Helichrysum splendidum (Thunb.) Less.

Synonyms
- Gnaphalium abyssinicum (Sch. Bip. ex Hochst.) Sch. Bip.; Gnaphalium splendidum Thunb.; Gnaphalium strictum Lam.; Gnaphalium xanthinum (DC.) Sch. Bip.; Helichrysum abyssinicum Sch. Bip. ex Hochst.; Helichrysum acrobates Bullock; Helichrysum hendersonae S. Moore; Helichrysum strictum (Lam.) Druce; Helichrysum xanthinum DC.

= Helichrysum splendidum =

Species of flowering plant

Helichrysum splendidum is a species of flowering plant in the family Asteraceae, found in Africa and Yemen A hardy evergreen perennial, it occurs from the Southern Cape to Ethiopia along the eastern escarpment mountains, favouring rocky places in fynbos, grassland and savanna biomes. It forms mound-shaped aggregations 1–2 meters high, sometimes covering entire hillsides. The species is found in South Africa, Eswatini, Lesotho, Tanzania, Ethiopia, South Sudan, Malawi, Zimbabwe, Zambia and Yemen. The distribution of this species is clearly anthropogenic, that is, closely linked to the movements of man through the ages.

The leaves are10–30 (–40) x 1–2 (–6) mm, linear, linear-oblong or linear-lanceolate, with revolute margins. Leaves have a blue-grey colour and are softly woolly on the under surface, as are the young stems. The upper surface is markedly parallel-veined and grooved, the veins protruding on the under side.

Virgate shrub up to 1.5 m tall, or rarely sprawling, branches thinly grey-woolly, closely leafy, older parts glabrescent, rough with leaf scars. Leaves 10–30 (–40) x 1–2 (–6) mm, linear, linear-oblong or linear-lanceolate, apex acute or subacute, mucronate, base broad, half-clasping, margins commonly revolute, upper surface thickly or thinly greyish-white woolly or glabrous or nearly so, lower surface greyish-white woolly. Heads heterogamous, hemispherical, 4–5 mm long, 5–8 mm across the radiating bracts, bases woolly, many in congested or open corymbose panicles terminating long leafy branches. Involucral bracts in c. 5 series, graded, loosely imbricate, inner about equaling or slightly exceeding flowers, tips minutely radiating, bright canary-yellow, rarely orange, glossy. Receptacle very shortly honeycombed. Flowers 47–105, 8–14 female, 39–84 homogamous, yellow. Achenes 0.75 mm long, with duplex hairs. Pappus bristles many, equaling corolla, scabrid, bases cohering by patent cilia.

— Lucid Central

This species is known in cultivation, and has gained the Royal Horticultural Society's Award of Garden Merit.

Helichrysums are a rich source of traditional medicines in South Africa. This species has pleasantly aromatic leaves from which an essential oil used in aromatherapy can be derived. The oil's main components are β-pinene, β-phellandrene, δ-cadinene, germacrene D, and 1,8-cineole.

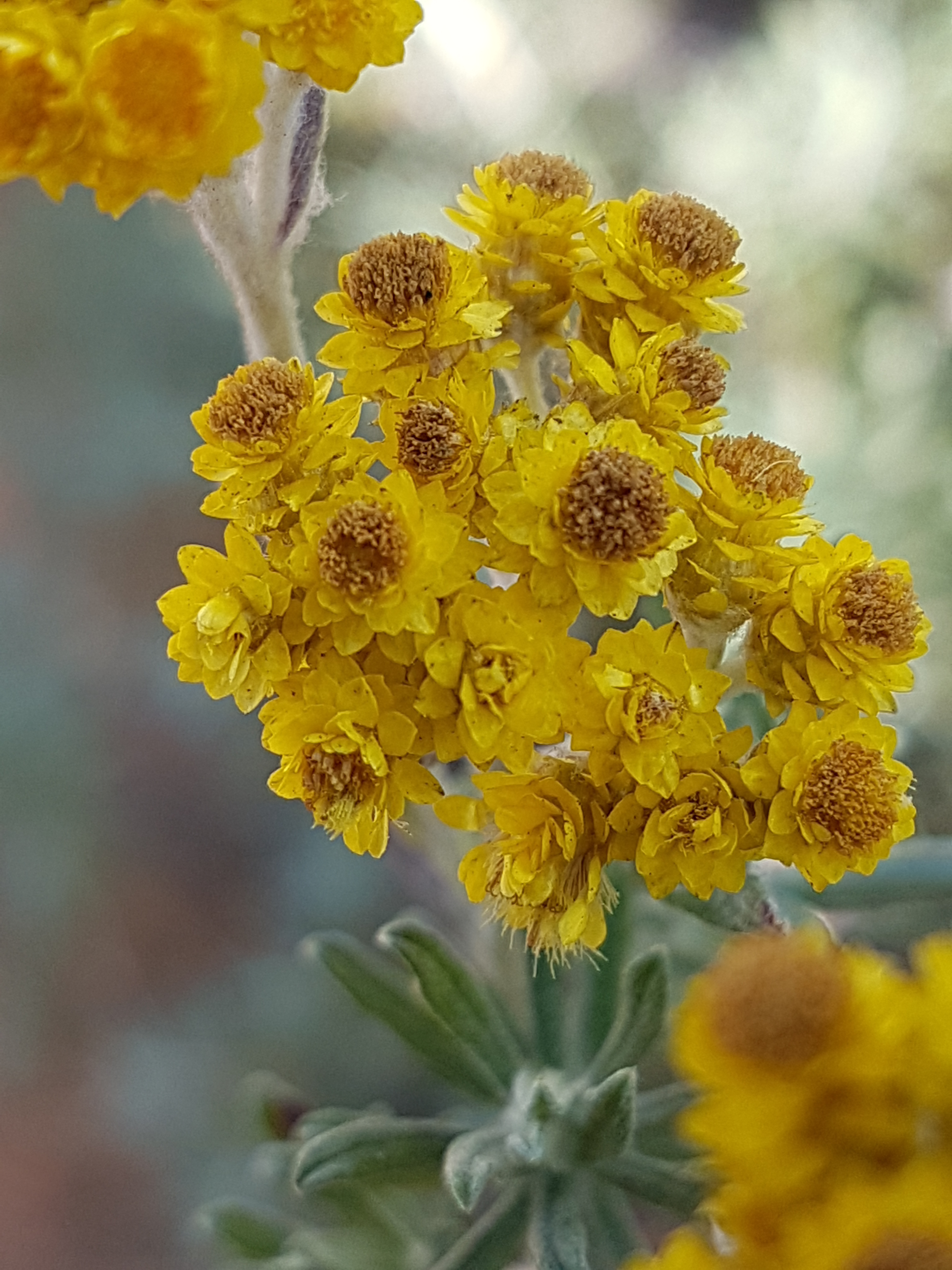

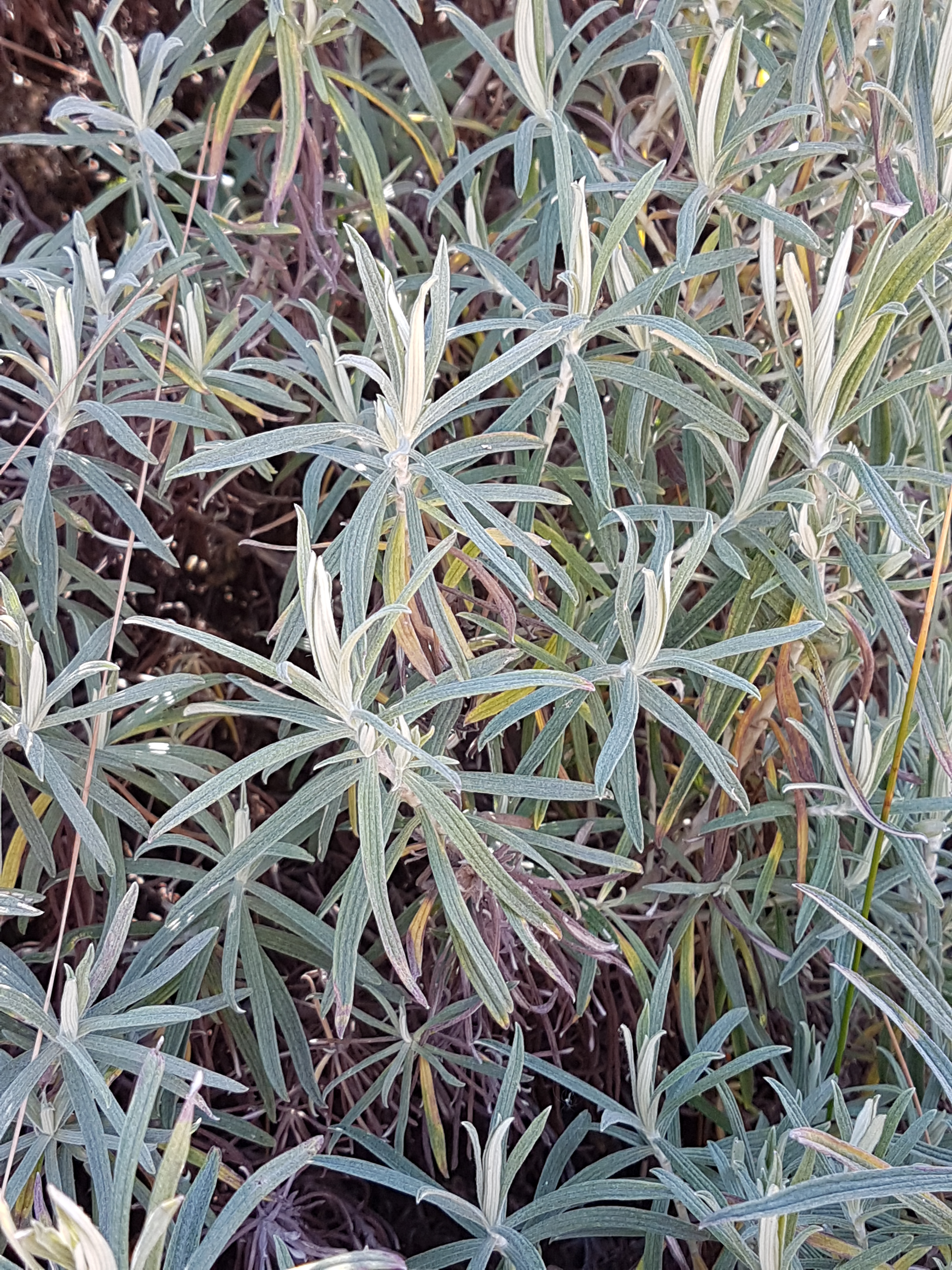
