= Helichrysum paulayanum =

Conservation status
- Least Concern (IUCN 3.1)

Scientific classification
- Kingdom: Plantae
- Clade: Tracheophytes
- Clade: Angiosperms
- Clade: Eudicots
- Clade: Asterids
- Order: Asterales
- Family: Asteraceae
- Genus: Helichrysum
- Species: H. paulayanum

Binomial name
- Helichrysum paulayanum Vierh.

Species of flowering plant

Helichrysum paulayanum is a species of flowering plant in the family Asteraceae. It is found only in the island of Socotra in Yemen.
