= Helichrysum pedunculatum =

Scientific classification
- Kingdom: Plantae
- Clade: Embryophytes
- Clade: Tracheophytes
- Clade: Angiosperms
- Clade: Eudicots
- Clade: Asterids
- Order: Asterales
- Family: Asteraceae
- Genus: Helichrysum
- Species: H. pedunculatum

Binomial name
- Helichrysum pedunculatum Hilliard & B.L.Burtt

Species of flowering plant

Helichrysum pedunculatum is a species of flowering plant in the family Asteraceae, native to South Africa and Lesotho. It is used in traditional medicine to prevent infection after circumcision.
