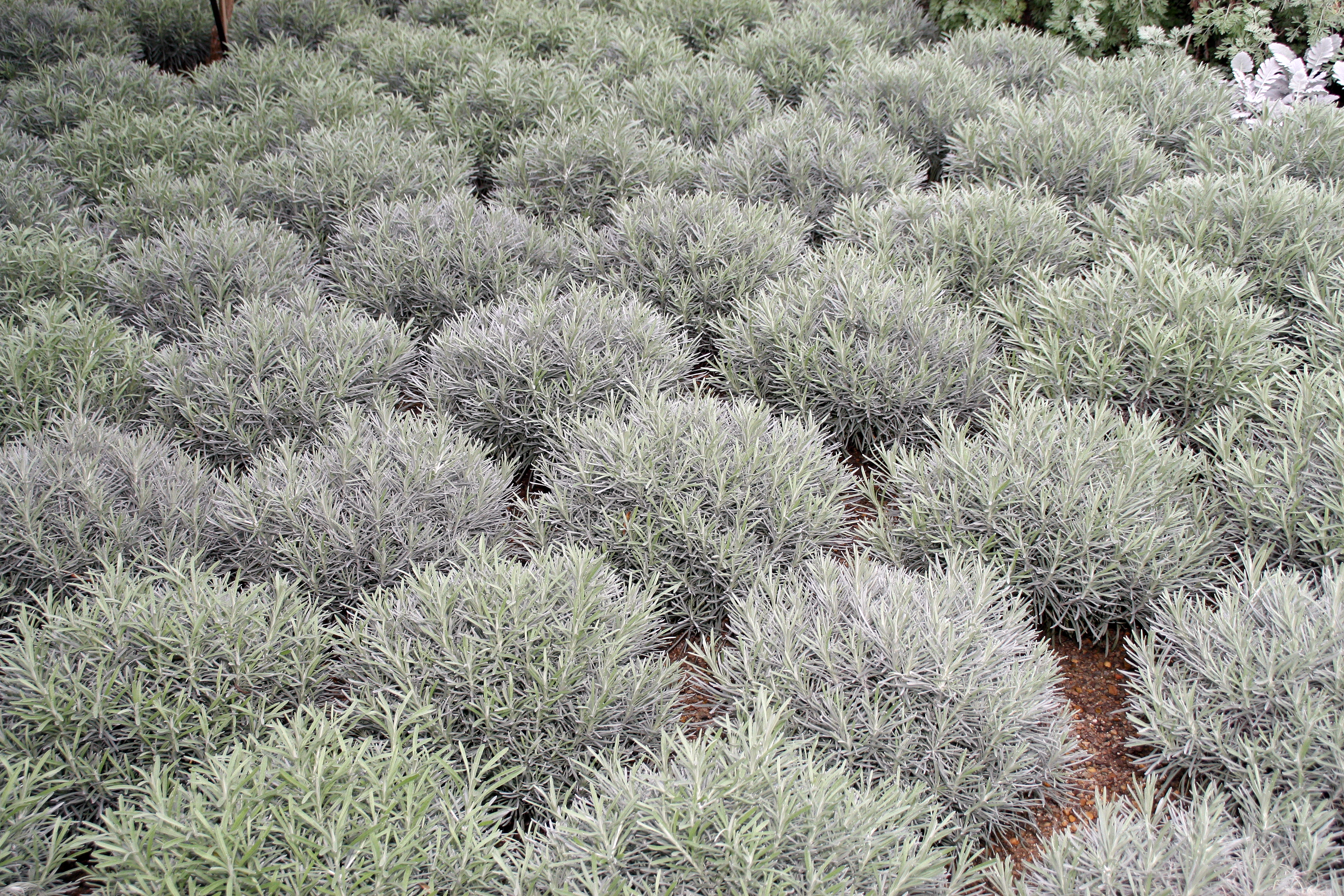
- In cultivation in Pennsylvania

Scientific classification
- Kingdom: Plantae
- Clade: Tracheophytes
- Clade: Angiosperms
- Clade: Eudicots
- Clade: Asterids
- Order: Asterales
- Family: Asteraceae
- Genus: Helichrysum
- Species: H. pendulum

Binomial name
- Helichrysum pendulum (C.Presl) C.Presl

Synonyms
- List: Gnaphalium ambiguum Guss. ex Ten., nom. illeg.; Gnaphalium conglobatum Viv., nom. illeg.; Gnaphalium crassifolium Guss. ex Ten.; Gnaphalium glutinosum Ten.; Gnaphalium glutinosum var. medium Kuntze; Gnaphalium glutinosum var. puberulum Kuntze; Gnaphalium glutinosum var. viscosissimum Kuntze; Gnaphalium lanceolatum Mottet; Gnaphalium pendulum C.Presl; Gnaphalium pedunculare L.; Gnaphalium tomentosum S.Mottet; Helichrysum boissieri Nyman; Helichrysum fontanesii Cambess.; Helichrysum fontanesii var. latifolium Font Quer; Helichrysum glutinosum Ten. ex Nyman; Helichrysum pendulum subsp. boissieri (Nyman) M.B.Crespo & Mateo; Helichrysum pendulum var. compactum Guss.; Helichrysum pendulum subsp. fontanesii (Cambess.) M.B.Crespo & Mateo; Helichrysum pendulum subsp. pendulum in; Helichrysum porcarii Tineo ex Lojac.; Helichrysum rupestre Boiss., nom. illeg.; Helichrysum rupestre subsp. glutinosum (Ten.) Nyman; Helichrysum rupestre subsp. pendulum (C.Presl) Arcang.; Helichrysum rupestre subsp. rouyi Mateo & M.B.Crespo; Helichrysum wickstromii Tineo ex Lojac.

= Helichrysum pendulum =

Species of plant

Helichrysum pendulum is a species of flowering plant in the family Asteraceae, native to the western Mediterranean (Algeria, the Balearic Islands, Morocco, Sicily, Spain, and Tunisia). It was first described by Carl Presl in 1822 as Gnaphalium pendulum.
