= Helichrysum saxatile =

Scientific classification
- Kingdom: Plantae
- Clade: Tracheophytes
- Clade: Angiosperms
- Clade: Eudicots
- Clade: Asterids
- Order: Asterales
- Family: Asteraceae
- Genus: Helichrysum
- Species: H. saxatile

Binomial name
- Helichrysum saxatile Moris

Subspecies
- See text.

Synonyms
- Of Helichrysum saxatile subsp. saxatile: Helichrysum rupestre Guss. ex Nyman, not validly published

Species of plant

Helichrysum saxatile is a species of flowering plant in the family Asteraceae, native to Sardinia. It was first described by Giuseppe Giacinto Moris in 1843.

== Subspecies ==
As of December 2025, Plants of the World Online accepted two subspecies:

- Helichrysum saxatile subsp. morisianum Bacch., Brullo & Mossa
- Helichrysum saxatile subsp. saxatile
