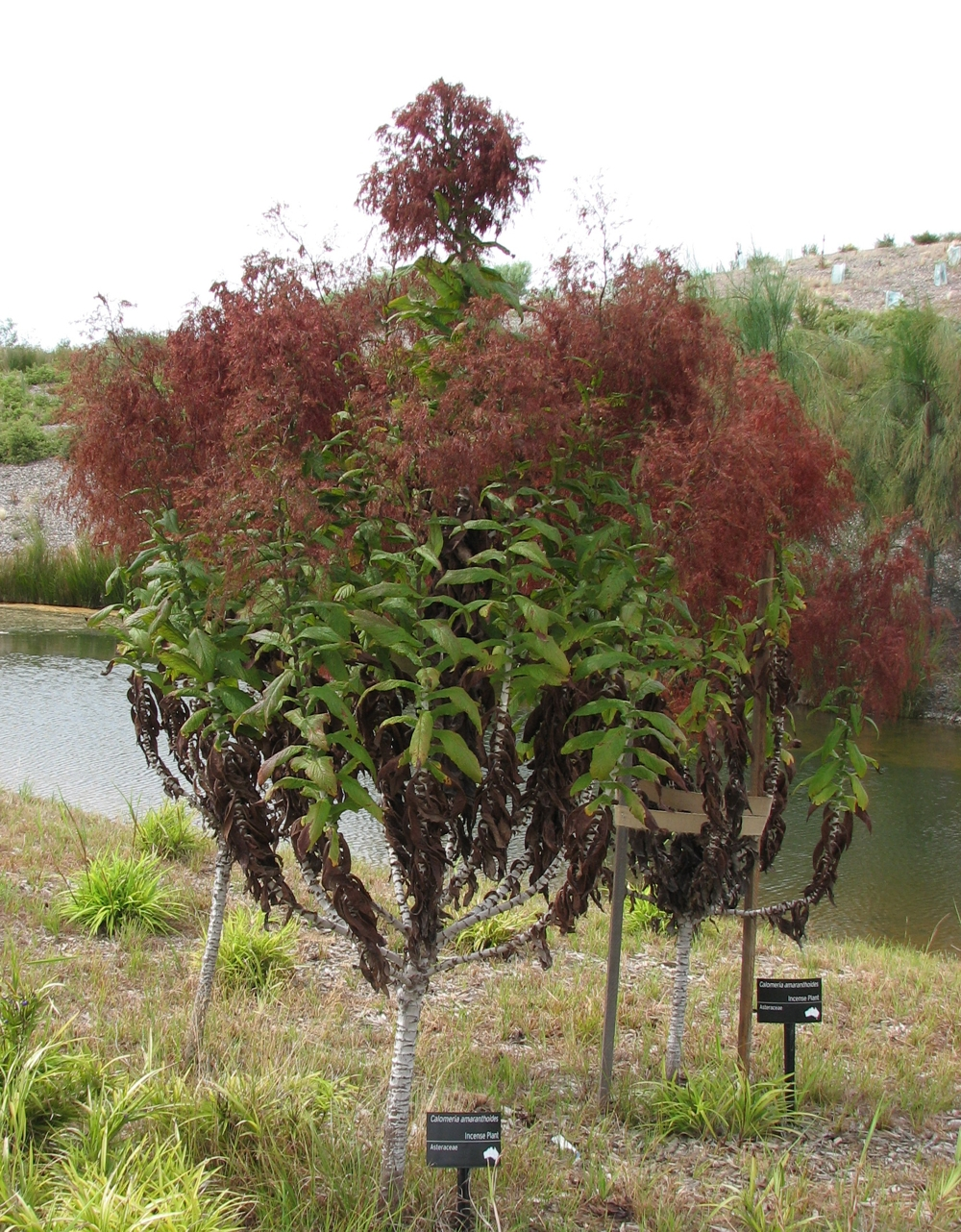
- Calomeria amaranthoides

Scientific classification
- Kingdom: Plantae
- Clade: Tracheophytes
- Clade: Angiosperms
- Clade: Eudicots
- Clade: Asterids
- Order: Asterales
- Family: Asteraceae
- Subfamily: Asteroideae
- Tribe: Gnaphalieae
- Genus: Calomeria; Vent.

Type species
- Calomeria amaranthoides Vent.

Synonyms
- Agathomeris Delile ex Delaun.; Humea sect. Calomeria (Vent.) F.Muell.

= Calomeria =

Genus of flowering plants

Calomeria is a plant genus in the family Asteraceae.

Accepted species

- Calomeria africana (S.Moore) Heine - Mozambique
- Calomeria amaranthoides Vent. - New South Wales and Victoria in Australia

formerly included

several species now in other genera, including Basedowia, Cassinia, Helichrysum, Humeocline and Thiseltonia.

== Description ==
Calomeria amaranthoides is a tall, fragrant biennial herb, growing to 3.5 metres in height. It has sticky stems and leaves which are green above and whitish beneath and are up to 15 cm long and 5 cm wide. Its flowers appear in large brown to red plumes in the summer (January to April in its native range).

== Taxonomy ==
The genus was first formally described by E.P. Ventenat in Jardin de la Malmaison in 1804.
