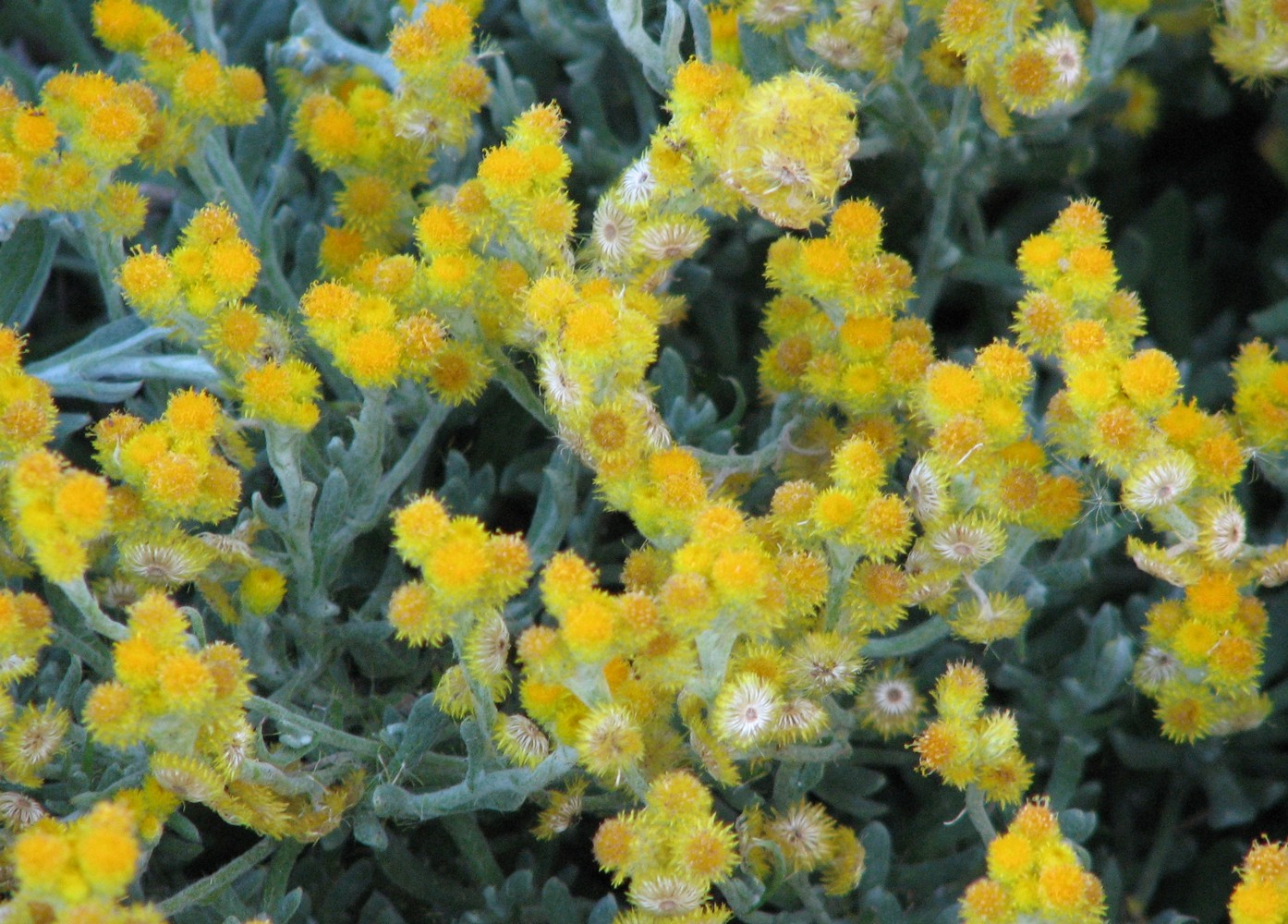
- Chrysocephalum apiculatum

Scientific classification
- Kingdom: Plantae
- Clade: Tracheophytes
- Clade: Angiosperms
- Clade: Eudicots
- Clade: Asterids
- Order: Asterales
- Family: Asteraceae
- Subfamily: Asteroideae
- Tribe: Gnaphalieae
- Genus: Chrysocephalum; Walp.

Synonyms
- Argyrophanes Schltdl.; Helichrysum sect. Chrysocephalum (Walp.) Benth.

= Chrysocephalum =

Genus of flowering plants

Chrysocephalum, known by the common name everlastings for their long life as cut flowers, is a genus of flowering plants in the family Asteraceae. There are nine species, all of which were formerly classified under other genera (Helichrysum, Helipterum and Leptorhynchos).

Species

All the species are endemic to Australia.

- Chrysocephalum apiculatum (Labill.) Steetz - common everlasting, yellow buttons
- Chrysocephalum baxteri (A.Cunn. ex DC.) Anderb.
- Chrysocephalum eremaeum (Haegi) Anderb.
- Chrysocephalum gilesii (F.Muell.) Paul G.Wilson
- Chrysocephalum pterochaetum F.Muell. - perennial sunray
- Chrysocephalum puteale (S.Moore) Paul G.Wilson
- Chrysocephalum semipapposum (Labill.) Steetz - clustered everlasting, yellow buttons
- Chrysocephalum sericeum Paul G.Wilson
- Chrysocephalum vitellinum Paul G.Wilson

== Gallery ==
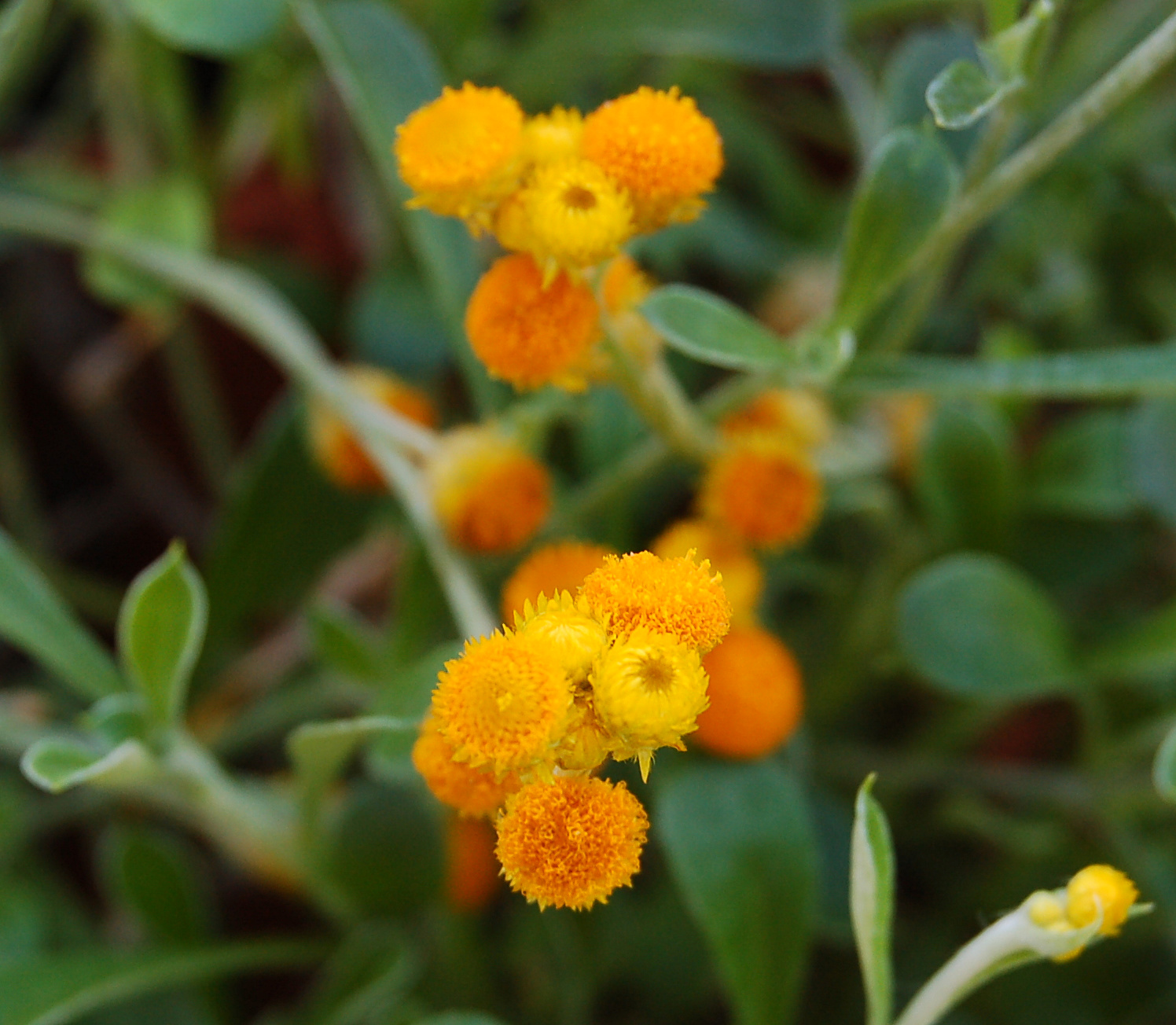
The cultivar C. apiculatum 'Flambe Orange'

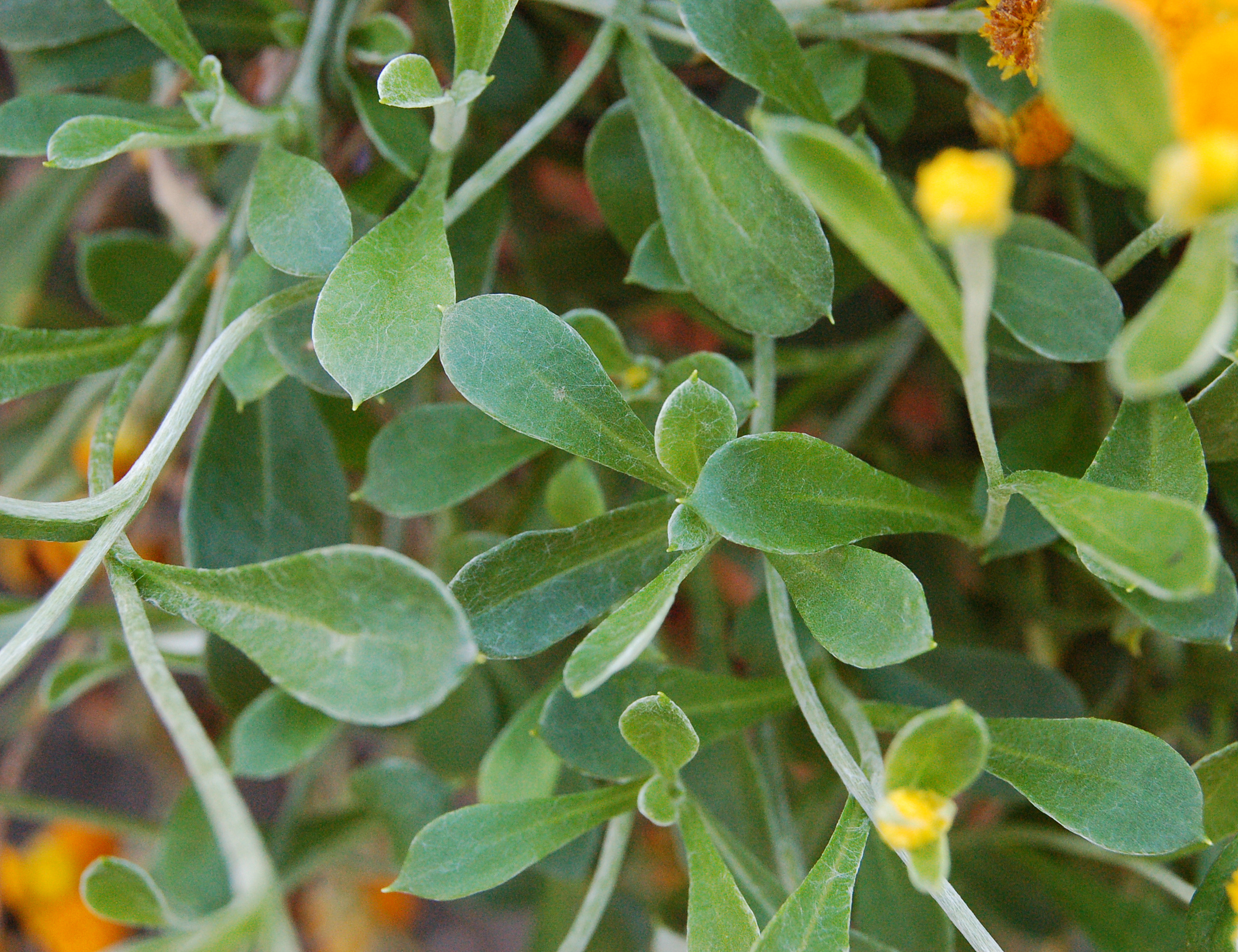
Foliage of 'Flambe Orange'
