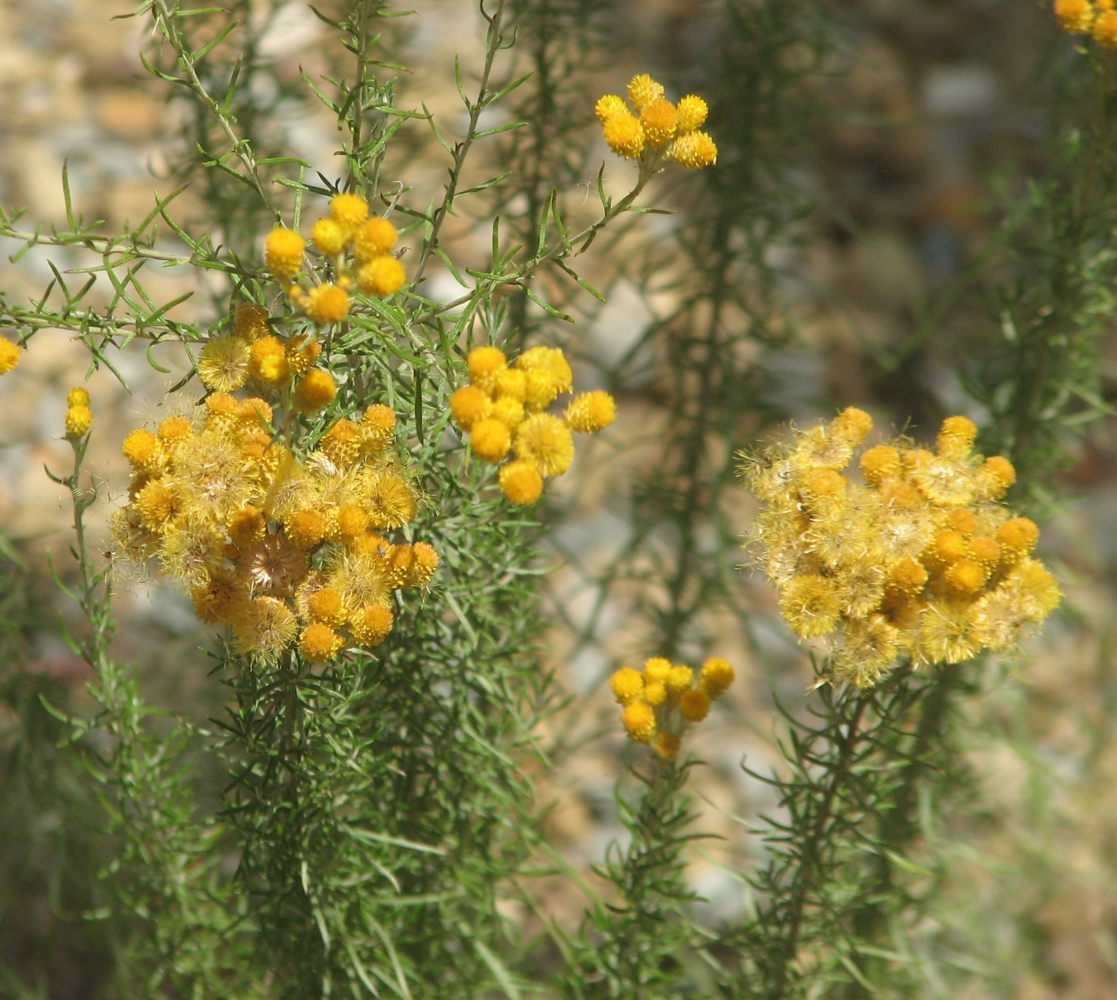

Scientific classification
- Kingdom: Plantae
- Clade: Embryophytes
- Clade: Tracheophytes
- Clade: Spermatophytes
- Clade: Angiosperms
- Clade: Eudicots
- Clade: Asterids
- Order: Asterales
- Family: Asteraceae
- Genus: Chrysocephalum
- Species: C. semipapposum

Binomial name
- Chrysocephalum semipapposum (Labill.) Steetz

Subspecies
- See text

Synonyms
- Gnaphalium semipapposum Labill. Helichrysum abrotaniforme Gand. Helichrysum adonidiforme Gand. Helichrysum ciliatum DC. Helichrysum hirtoviscosum Gand. Helichrysum maidenii Gand. Helichrysum porrectum Gand. Helichrysum readeri Gand. Helichrysum sarcodes Gand. Helichrysum semipapposum (Labill.) DC. Helichrysum squarrulosum DC. Helichrysum sulcaticaule Gand. Helichrysum tasmanicum Gand. Helichrysum waitzioides (Diels) Domin

= Chrysocephalum semipapposum =

Species of plant

Chrysocephalum semipapposum, commonly known as clustered everlasting is a perennial shrub native to Australia. Clustered everlasting belongs to the family Asteraceae. C. semipapposum produces terminal flowers heads in clusters, mainly between spring and early summer with silver-grey appearing stems and branches. It grows up to 40 cm high and 60 cm high, although there have been some varieties which can grow up to 1 m. C. semipapposum is often confused with Chrysocephalum apiculatum or 'yellow buttons', due to their similar appearances. C. semipapposum has 4 different subspecies, however they lack distinctive qualities and are often hard to identify. C. semipapposum is endemic to Australia and can be found in multiple states, most notably within Victoria. The plant is found in a variety of habitats including dry rocky regions. Clustered everlasting often grows sparsely and is rarely found in abundance and can be mistaken for a weed. Clustered everlasting has many uses, including as a source of nectar for butterflies, cut flowers or as an addition to a garden.

== Description ==
Chrysocephalum semipapposum is a perennial herbaceous shrub, which is highly variable. Generally, the erect shrub is 15–60 cm high, and is sprawling in nature, with its width up to 40 cm. Despite this general 60 cm height cap, there have been forms of Chrysocephalum semipapposum found up to 1 metre tall. Chrysocephalum semipapposum can be sometimes mistaken for a weed.

=== Morphology ===
==== Inflorescence ====
The floral display of the Chrysocephalum semipapposum is a corymb, or a cluster of flowers that form a flat head and can be up to 10 cm in diameter. The corymb of the Chrysocephalum semipapposum contains 70 capitula, or flowering shoots which gives the appearance of a single flower. The colour of the capitula can occur from a lemon shade to a common orange shade. These flower heads are compact clusters and are surrounded by bracts. Bracts are an adapted leaf which surrounds the flower with a woolly grey appearance.

==== Stems ====
These corymbs are found on leafy branches, which give a silver-grey appearance. This appearance is due to silky glandular hairs which covers the stems and foliage of Chrysocephalum semipapposum. The slender and erect stems grow from the base of the plant. The leaves are linear in shape and are 0.2–5 cm long and 1-2mm wide. The leaves decrease in size towards the tip of the stem and can end in a sharp or a long, drawn-out point. The leaves are flat and are denser towards to bottom of the plant. The upright stems grow from the base of the plant.

==== Fruit ====
Chrysocephalum semipapposum produces a fruit or achene which does not have to open to bear its seeds. This fruit is found within the dried-out flower heads, and many fruits grow within each flower head. The fruits have pappus bristles, which appear as a feathery attachment. The fruit is white and yellow. Chrysocephalum semipapposum has both bisexual and female flowers

==== Rhizomes ====
Chrysocephalum semipapposum is a rhizomatous herb. A rhizome is a usually horizontal underground stem. The rhizome produces shoots, which grow from the top of the stem. Rhizomes are different from the roots of a plant. They can be distinguished through the appearance of buds and nodes on rhizomes. Rhizomes can produce roots, which occur on the bottom of the horizontal subterranean stems. Rhizomes can live for several years and persist in the soil after they die.

==== Chrysocephalum apiculatum similarities ====
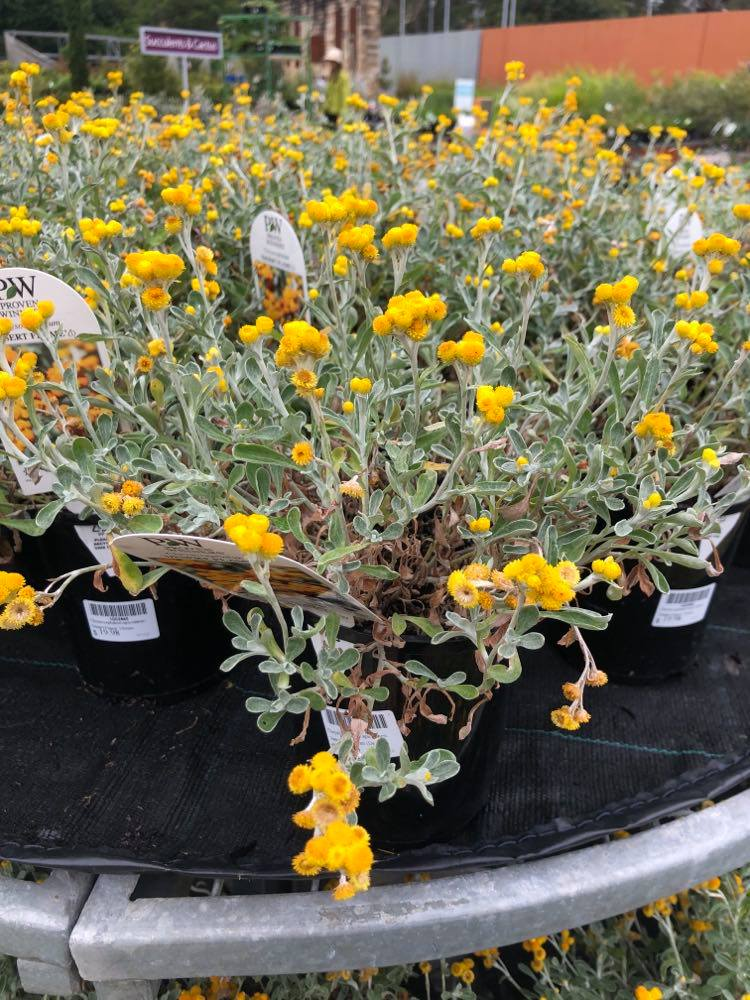
Photograph of Chrysocephalum apiculatum available for sale at a garden centre.

Chrysocephalum apiculatum is similar in appearance to the Chrysocephalum semipapposum. The common names of these plants are often used interchangeably in both professional and recreational settings. The inflorescence, or flower, of Chrysocephalum semipapposum is similar in physical appearance to Chrysocephalum apiculatum which causes confusion when identifying the plant. However, Chrysocephalum apiculatum is a taller plant and has the possibility to be single stemmed or multi-stemmed, where Chrysocephalum semipapposum is only multi-stemmed. C. apiculatum may also have a loose to compact flowerhead, where C. semipapposum has compact flowerhead. Chrysocephalum apiculatum is distributed across all Australian states. C. apiculatum also has numerous named subspecies. These factors could attribute to the higher notability of C. apiculatum than C. semipapposum.

== Taxonomy ==
Chrysocephalum semipapposum is a part of the Asteraceae family, commonly known as daisies, under the Chrysocephalum genus. The Asteraceae family is classified through the following characteristics. The family is made up of shrubs or herbaceous plants. The plants may be annual or perennial and the flower heads contain complicated inflorescence which are surrounded by bracts.

Chrysocephalum semipapposum is a part of the Gnaphalieae tribe, which is one of the larger tribes within the Asteraceae family. This tribe has a long history of taxonomic changes, resulting in many taxonomic changes for Chrysocephalum semipapposum.

Chrysocephalum semipapposum is formerly known as Helichrysum semipapposum. Helichrysum was historically very broad and included a wide range of plant species. The wide defining characteristics made the genus polyphyletic. A polyphyletic genus refers to a group of organisms which are derived from more than one ancestor and are not suitable to be placed in the same taxon. The Helichrysum genus has been reassessed by botanist Arne Anderberg to apply to African and Eurasian plants. Similar Australian plants have been reclassified to the Chrysocephalum genus.

The word chrysocephalum derives from Greek origins. Chryso translates to golden, and cephalus translates to headed, referring to the appearance of the compact flowers.

=== Variation ===
Chrysocephalum semipapposum has 5 subspecies. These subspecies are determined by both morphological features or physical attributes and location in which these varieties are found. C. semipapposum has historically been taxonomically difficult and the subspecies have similar variations which cause overlap. Because of these similar attributes, the subspecies are broad based and do not have specific infraspecific or scientific names.

=== Subspecies ===
The subspecies of C. semipapposum have been defined by Paul G. Wilson. Wilson has made significant contributions in botanical taxonomy. His work is accepted by the International Plant Names Index and has botanical authority.

==== Chrysocephalum semipapposum subsp. semipapposum ====
Chrysocephalum semipapposum subsp. semipapposum is an aromatic perennial herb. This sub-species has sericeous stems, or stems which are covered in fine hair. The leaves are narrow and evenly spread along these stems. This variety is found in New South Wales, South Australia, Victoria and Tasmania.

==== Chrysocephalum semipapposum subsp. lineare ====
This variety grows up to 80 cm high, with slender stems and narrow or linear leaves. This sub-species is generally woolly all over. It can also either have no bristles or have one bristle on the female florets. This subspecies is found in southern Eastern New South Wales, South Australia, Victoria and Tasmania. Occurs in numerous habitats. Growth cycle: December to February. This sub-species has substantial variation. Due to this variation the sub-species has overlap with both subsp. semipapposum and subsp. asperum.

==== Chrysocephalum semipapposum subsp. brevifolium ====
Chrysocephalum semipapposum subsp. brevifolium grows up to 50 cm high. It has slender sparsely cottony stems with thick but narrow leaves 2–3 cm long at the top of the plant and 2–6 cm long at the base of the plant. The female florets generally have five bristles. This subspecies is found in eastern New South Wales, central and south-eastern South Australia, and central and eastern Victoria.

==== Chrysocephalum semipapposum subsp. asperum ====
Chrysocephalum semipapposum subsp. asperum grows up to 90 cm high. The stems have minimal hair, and the leaves grow up to 7 cm long. This subspecies occurs in eastern New South Wales, eastern Victoria, south-east Queensland and north-eastern Tasmania.

==== Chrysocephalum semipapposum subsp. occidentale ====
This subspecies has been found to grow from 40 to 120 cm high with slender erect stems and cottony leaves which are scattered along the stems. This subspecies is found in south-western Western Australia.

== Distribution and habitat ==
Chrysocephalum semipapposum is a native shrub to Australia. C. semipapposum varieties have been found in most Australian states, including New South Wales, South Australia, Queensland and Tasmania however C. semipapposum has been most notably found within Victoria.

Chrysocephalum semipapposum occurs in a variety of habitats. These habitats include woodland hills, grassland hills, mountains or isolated rocky rises. They are rarely found in large groups and are most commonly found as scattered individual shrubs. C. semipapposum can grow in a variety of soils and is a tough plant which can withstand drought.

== Ecology ==
The flowering season of C. semipapposum occurs from September until December, mainly throughout spring and summer. C. semipapposum is a tough shrub and natural disturbances, such as fires promote growth and flowering. The nectar produced by the clustered everlasting flowers are a source of food for butterflies. The plant itself is minimally used as a food option for grazing animals. Chrysocephalum semipapposum will only be eaten as a last resort, when there are limited food sources available.

Growth may be impacted by lower light, producing leggy growth. The growth can also be impacted by the invasion of non-native plants.

Chrysocephalum semipapposum was found to inhibit the process of nitrification in the rhizosphere, when compared to non-rhizosphere soil. The rhizosphere is the soil surrounding the plants roots. Nitrification is the process which transforms the compound ammonium, which is relatively soil bound, into nitrate. Nitrate is more mobile, and has the ability to get lost in the surrounding environment. Nitrification can cause negative impacts on the environment. High levels of nitrogen in the environment can cause toxic algae blooms, biodiversity loss and can contribute to greenhouse gas emissions. Nitrification can also lose up to 50% of nitrogen for the plant. This compound is very important in the creation of plant proteins and stimulating growth within the plant. The rhizosphere has a great impact to the plants ability to take in nutrients, which is integral to the health and growth of the plant. The ability of C. semipapposum to inhibit the process of nitrification is closely related to the lower amount of ammonia oxidising bacteria (AOB) found in the rhizosphere. Further research is needed to evaluate the exact mechanisms found in C. semipapposum which contribute to the inhibition of nitrification.

== Uses ==
The toughness of the clustered everlasting allows it to be used as a ground-covering in residential gardens. Clustered everlasting can also be used to keep weeds out. It is easy to care for due to its drought tolerance and frost resistance. Growing conditions include part shade to full sun, and a dry or well-drained soil. It can handle heavy clay, loam or sand based soils. If dried out, regular pruning down to the base of the stem can promote growth in the next season.

The seed viability for C. semipapposum is higher or equal to 80%, and can also be easily propagated. Propagation can occur through taking cuttings of a pre-existing plant and placing them within a mist bed. Germination can occur under both light, part shade and dark conditions. However, lower light availability may produce thin and underdeveloped seedlings and leggy growth. Germination may also be impacted by insect activity Germination time ranges from 2–4 weeks.

Clustered everlasting can also be used as a cut flower in floral arrangements. Clustered everlasting has a vase life of 7–14 days making it ideal as a flower filler. The bright yellow flowers will also complement the flower market. C. Semipapposum can also be used in dried floral arrangements.
