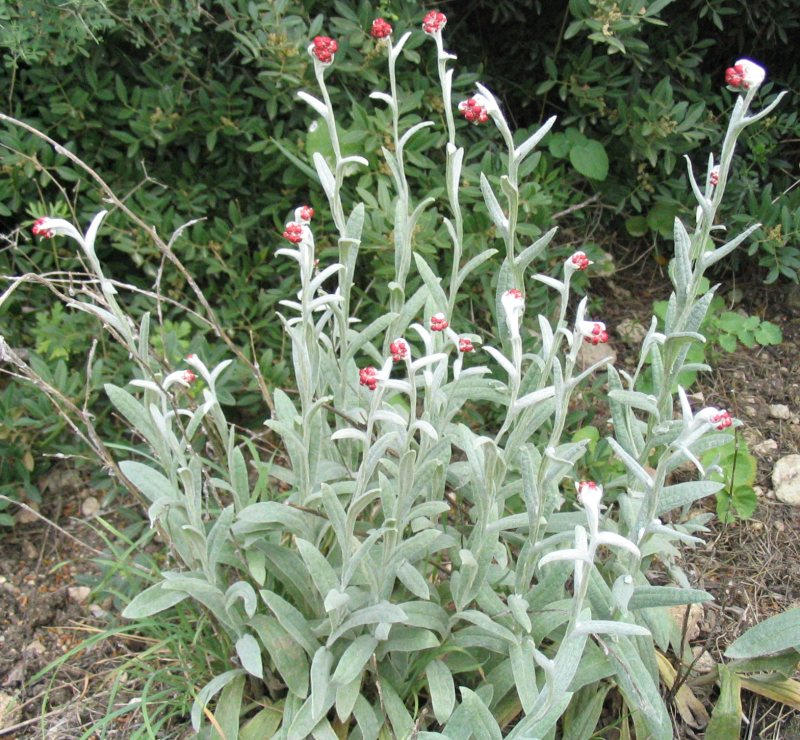
- Helichrysum sanguineum

Scientific classification
- Kingdom: Plantae
- Clade: Tracheophytes
- Clade: Angiosperms
- Clade: Eudicots
- Clade: Asterids
- Order: Asterales
- Family: Asteraceae
- Subfamily: Asteroideae
- Tribe: Gnaphalieae
- Genus: Helichrysum; Mill., 1754

Species
- See list of Helichrysum species

= Helichrysum =

Genus of flowering plants

The genus Helichrysum /hɛlɪˈkraɪsəm/ consists of an estimated 600 species of flowering plants in the sunflower family (Asteraceae). The type species is Helichrysum orientale. They often go by the names everlasting, immortelle, and strawflower. The name is derived from the Ancient Greek words ἥλιος (helios, sun) and χρῡσός (chrysos, gold).

It occurs in Africa (with 244 species in South Africa), Madagascar, Australasia and Eurasia. The plants may be annuals, herbaceous perennials or shrubs, growing to a height of 60–90 cm (24–35 inches). The genus was a wastebasket taxon, and many of its members have been reclassified in smaller genera, most notably the Everlastings, now in the genus Xerochrysum.

Their leaves are oblong to lanceolate. They are flat and pubescent on both sides. The bristles of the pappus are scabrous, barbellate, or plumose.

The receptacle (base of the flower head) is often smooth, with a fringed margin, or honey-combed, and resemble daisies. They may be in almost all colors, except blue. There are many capitula and generally flat-topped corymbs or panicles. The corolla lobes show glandular hairs at the abaxial surface.

Helichrysum species are used as food plants by the larvae of some Lepidoptera species including the bucculaticid leaf-miners Bucculatrix gnaphaliella (which feeds exclusively on Helichrysum arenarium) and Bucculatrix helichrysella (feeds exclusively on H. italicum) and the Coleophora case-bearers C. caelebipennella, C. gnaphalii (feeds exclusively on H arenarium) and C. helichrysiella (feeds exclusively on H. italicum).

== Species ==
Hilliard (1983) divided this large and heterogeneous genus in 30 morphological groups. But the genus remains controversial and is considered by many to be an artificial genus. The taxonomy of this large polymorphic and probably polyphyletic genus is complex and not yet satisfactorily resolved. Several Australian species, such as H. acuminatum and H. bracteatum, have been reclassified in the genus Xerochrysum in 1991, resp. as X. subundulatum and X. bracteatum. In 1989, misaligned species of Helichrysum were reclassified in Syncarpha. Species included in Pseudognaphalium, Anaphalis, Achyrocline and Humeocline are probably congeneric with Helichrysum. Australian species have also been reclassified to the genus Chrysocephalum, including Chrysocephalum semipapposum and Chrysocephalum apiculatum.

== Uses ==
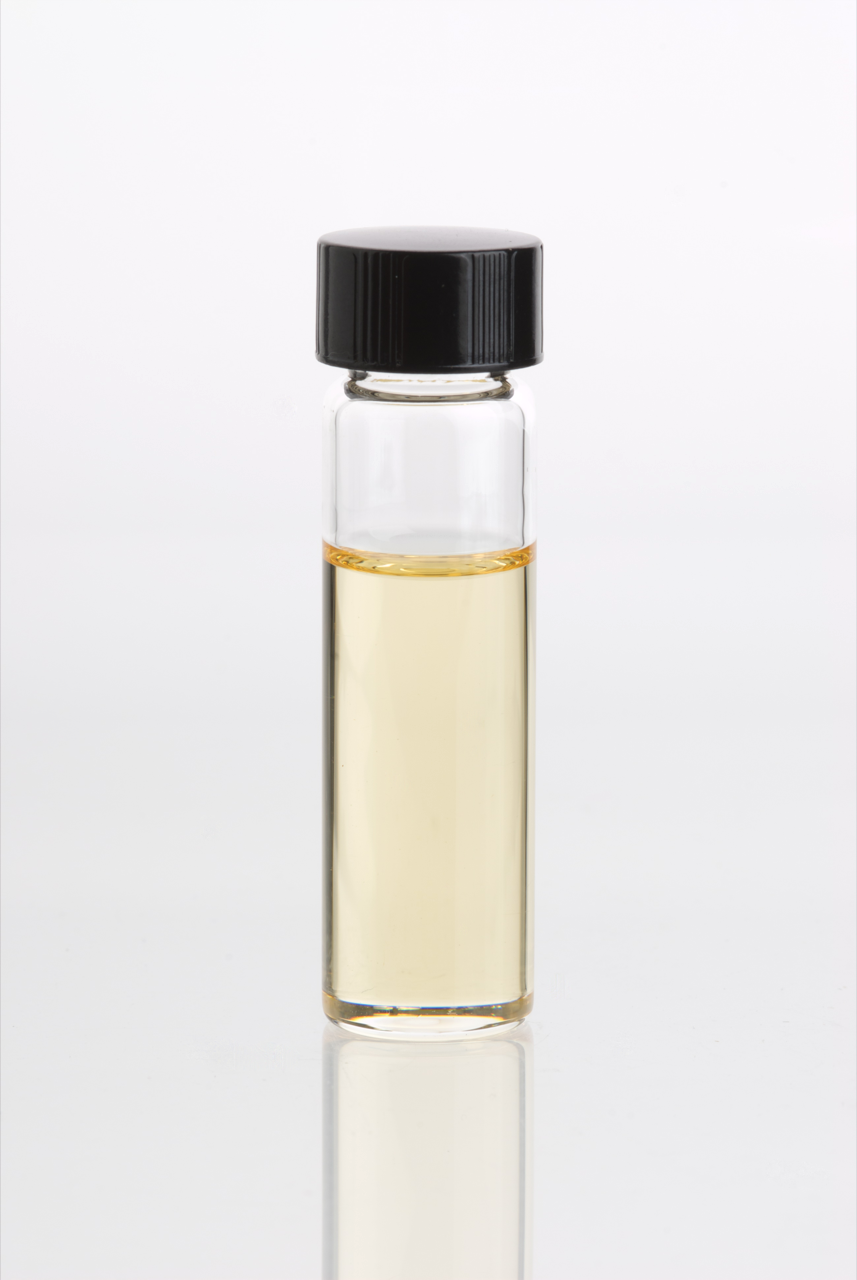
Helichrysum italicum essential oil in glass vial

Several species are grown as ornamental plants, and for dried flowers. When cut young and dried, the open flowers and stalks preserve their colour and shape for long periods.

Helichrysum italicum (synonym Helichrysum angustifolium) is steam distilled to produce a yellow-reddish essential oil popular in fragrance for its unique scent, best described as herbaceous, sweet, and honey-like. The epithet angustifolium means narrow leaved. It is commonly misspelled as augustifolium.

== Gallery ==
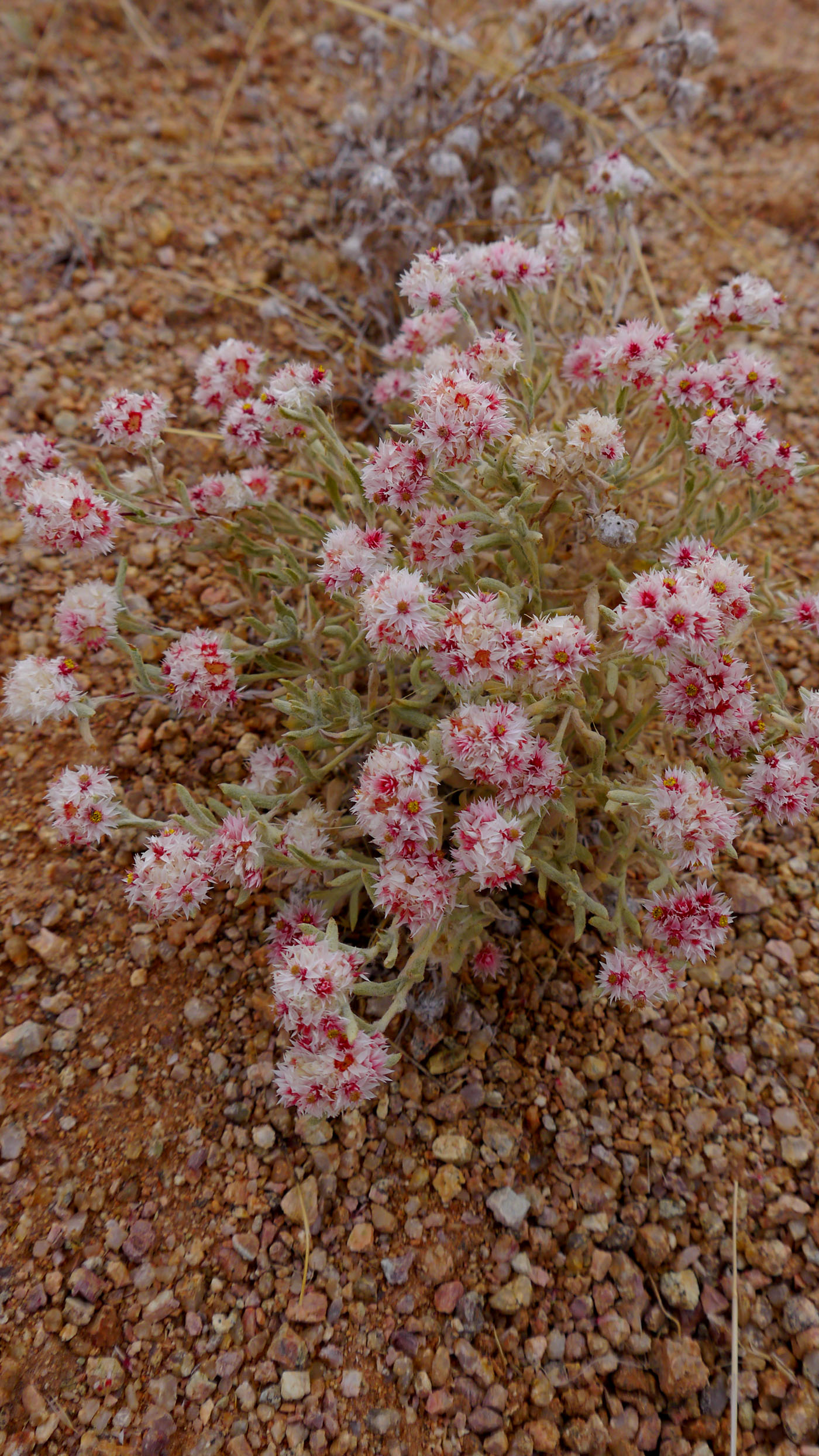
Helichrysum candolleanum in Namibia

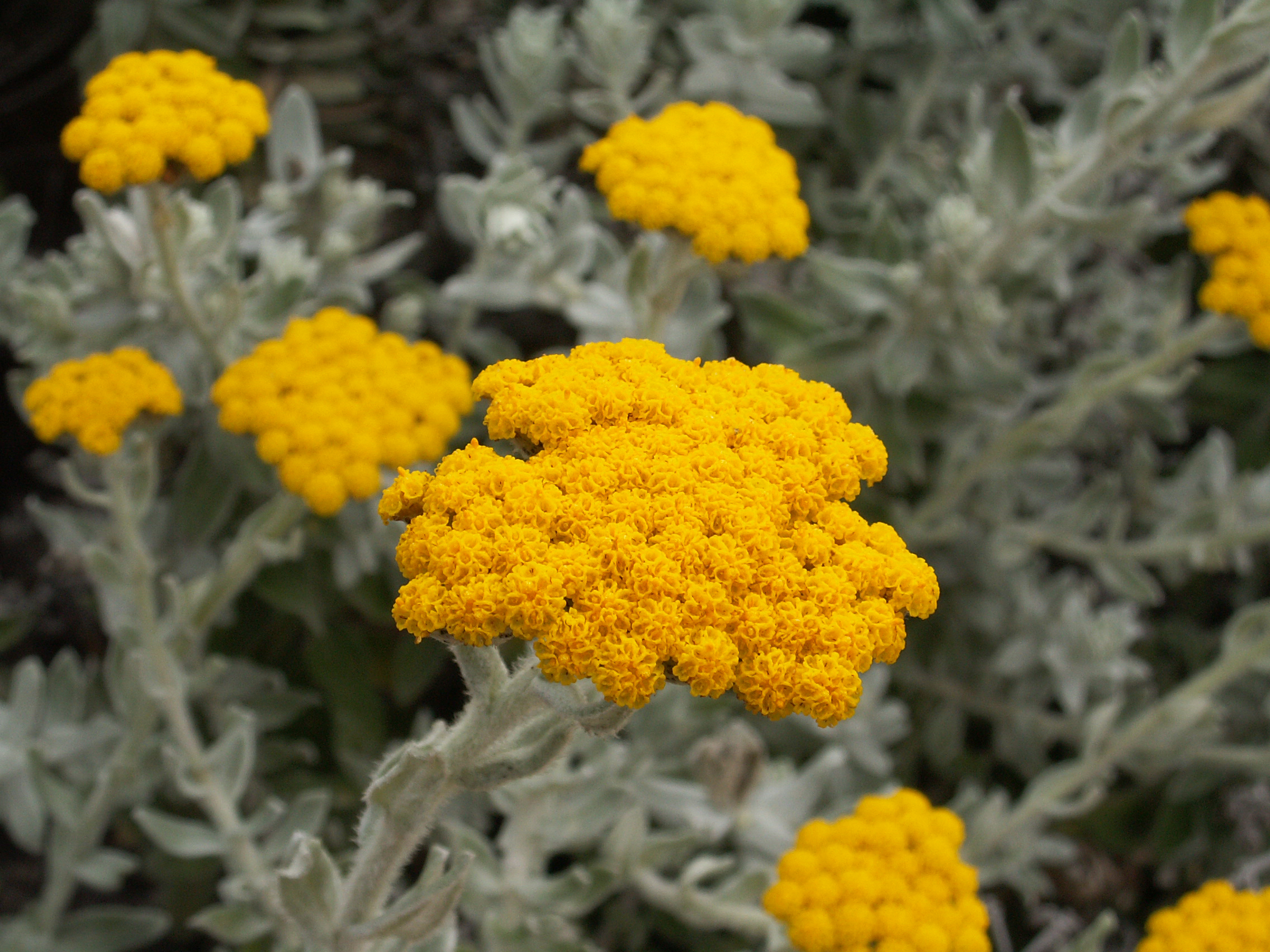
Helichrysum moeserianum in De Hoop N.R., South Africa

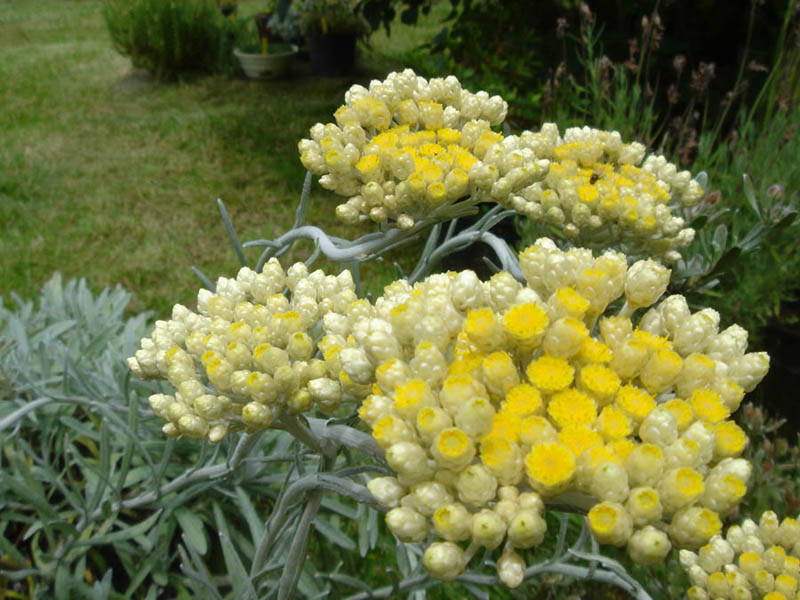
Helichrysum orientale

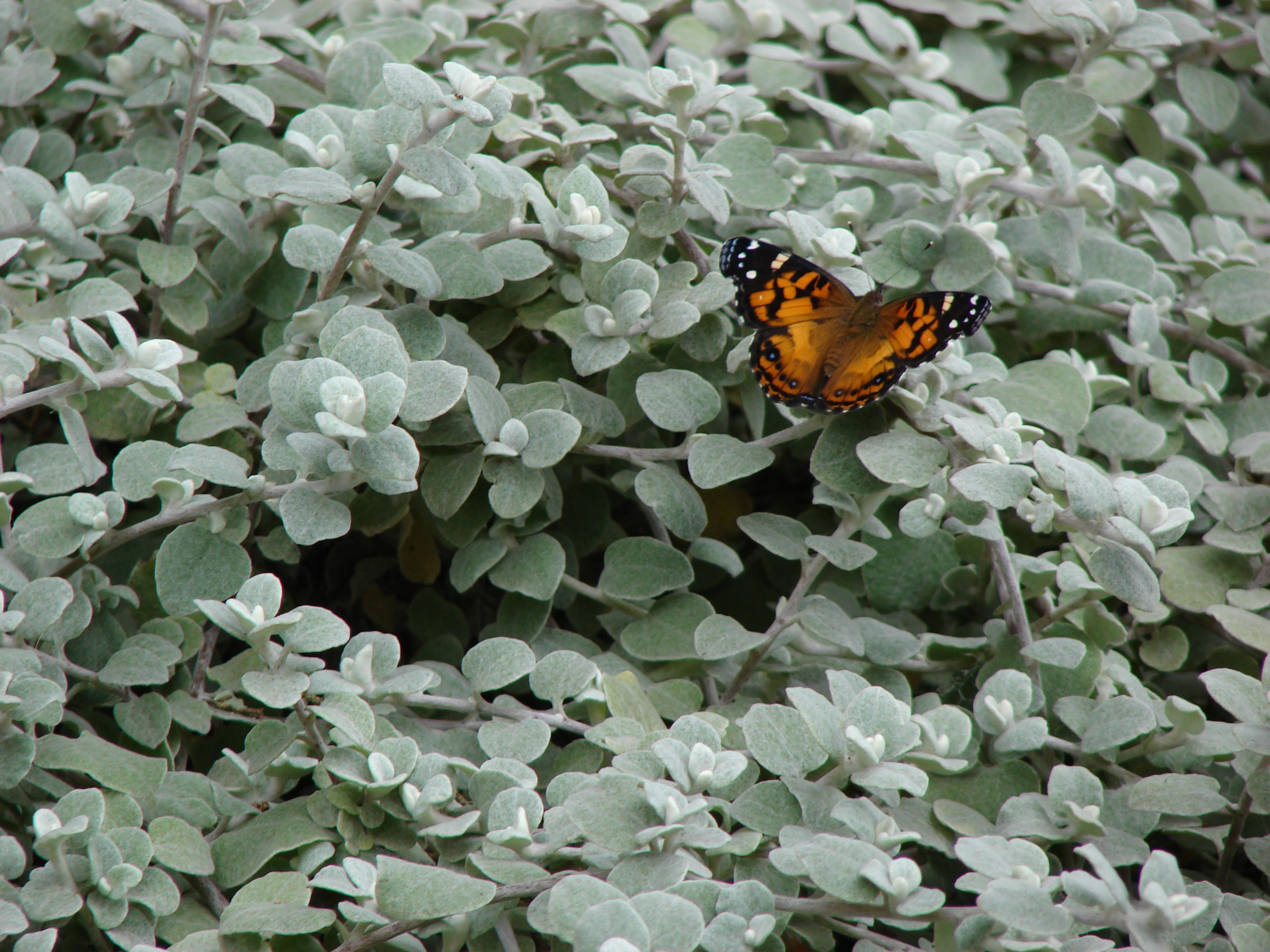
Helichrysum petiolare, Licorice Plant

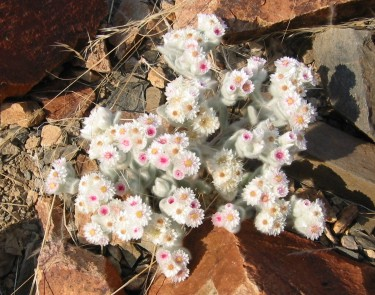
Helichrysum roseo-niveum in Namibia

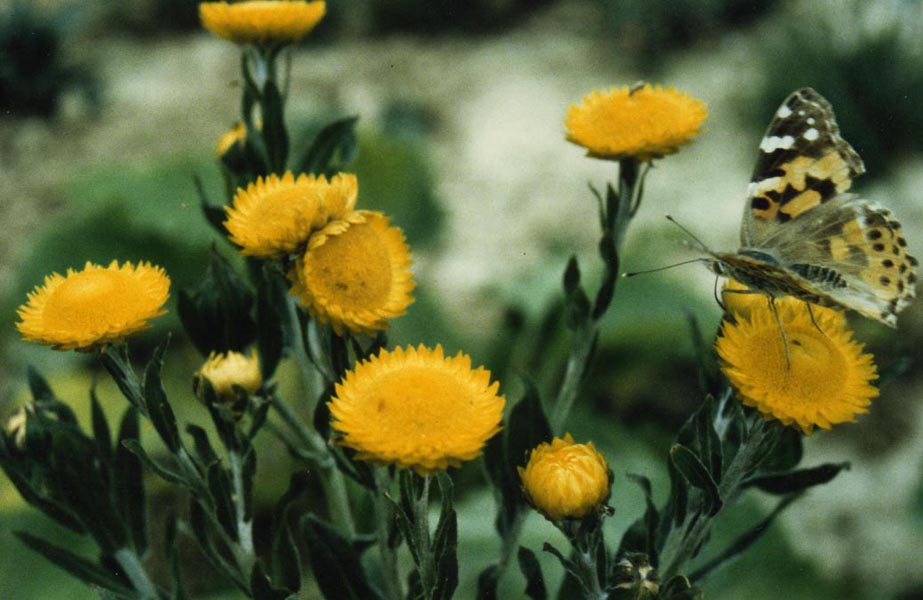
Helichrysum setosum

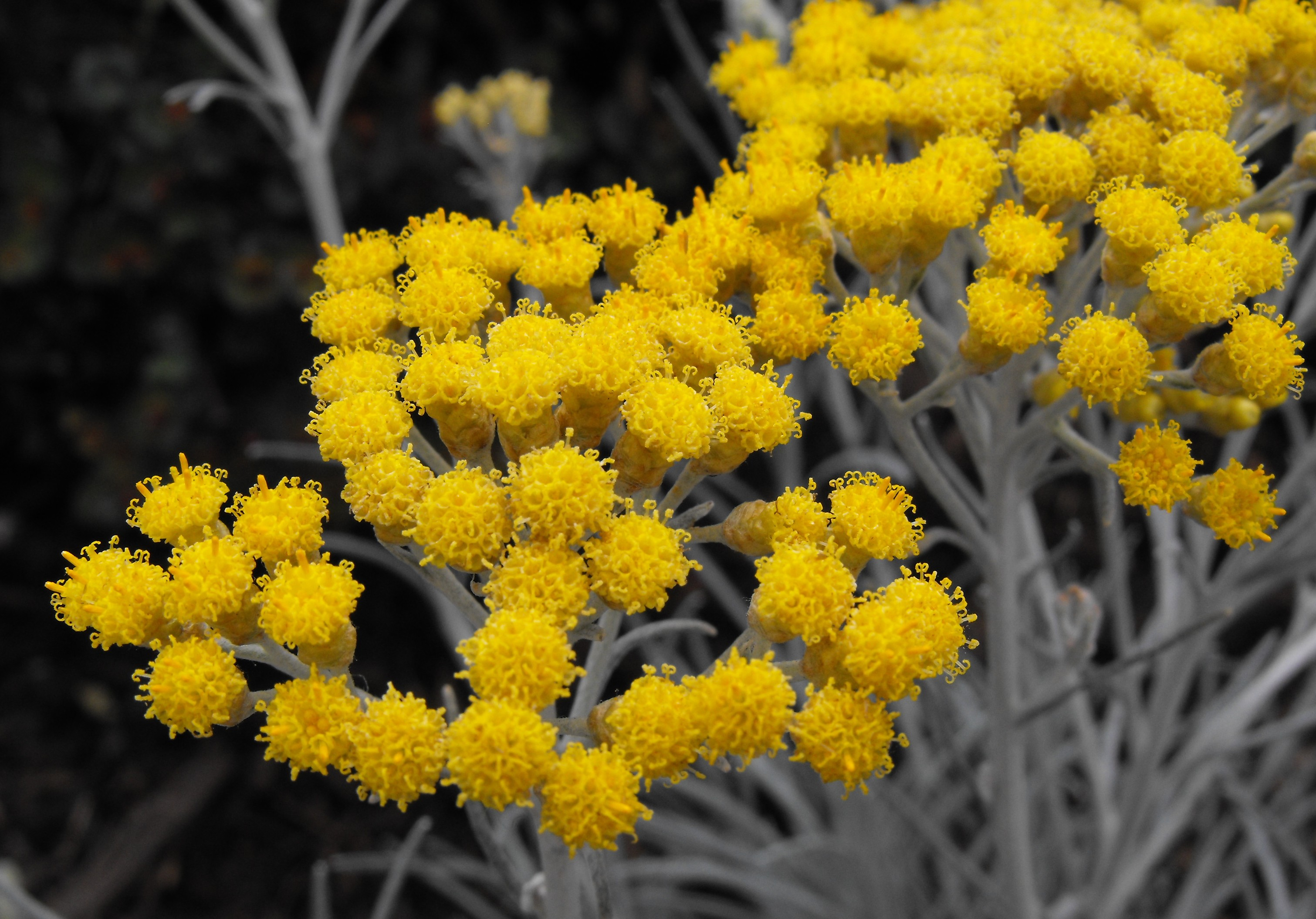
Helichrysum thianschanicum 'Icicles' on display at the San Diego County Fair, CA, USA

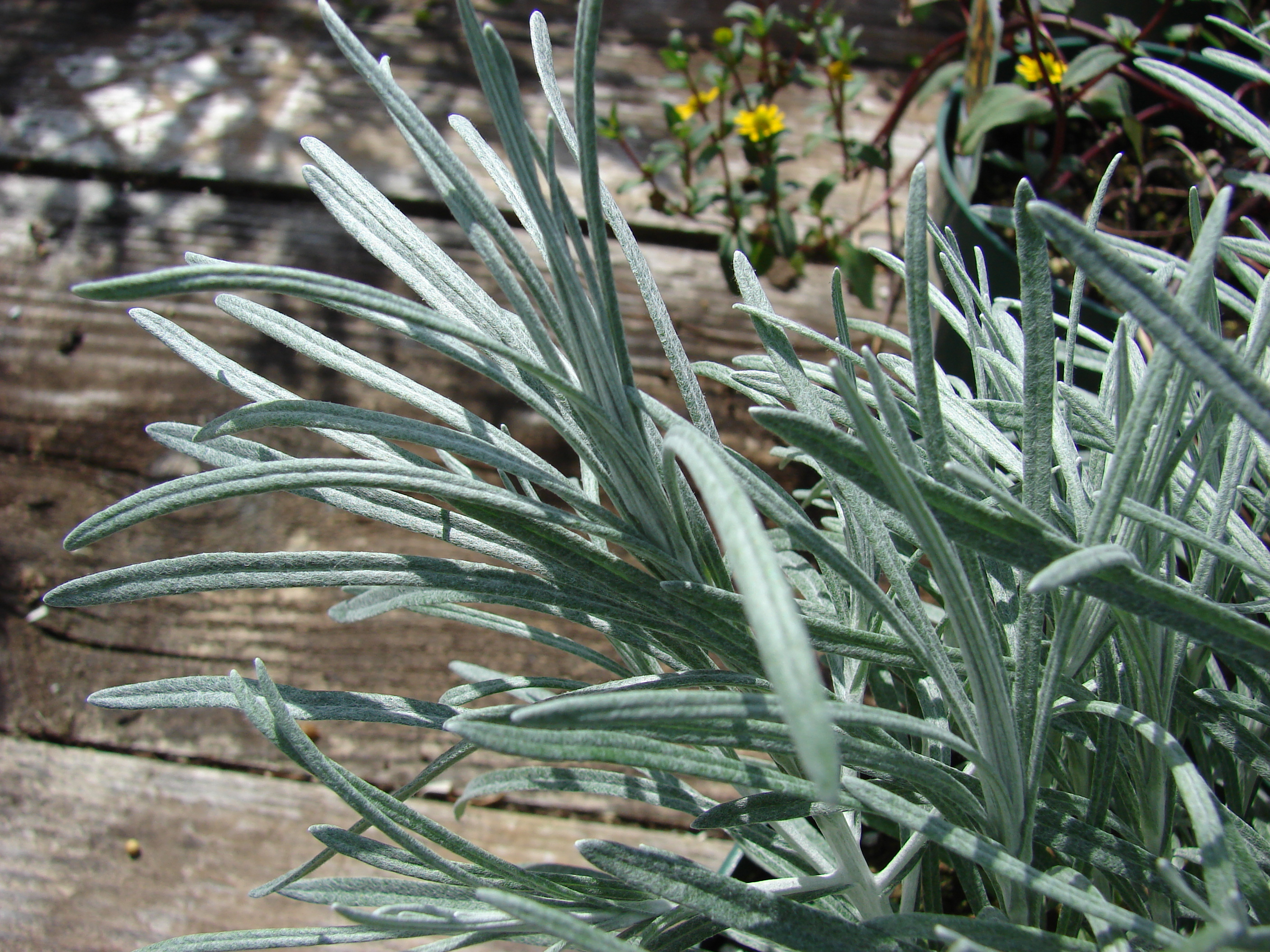
Helichrysum thianschanicum (Icicles leaves) at nursery on Maui

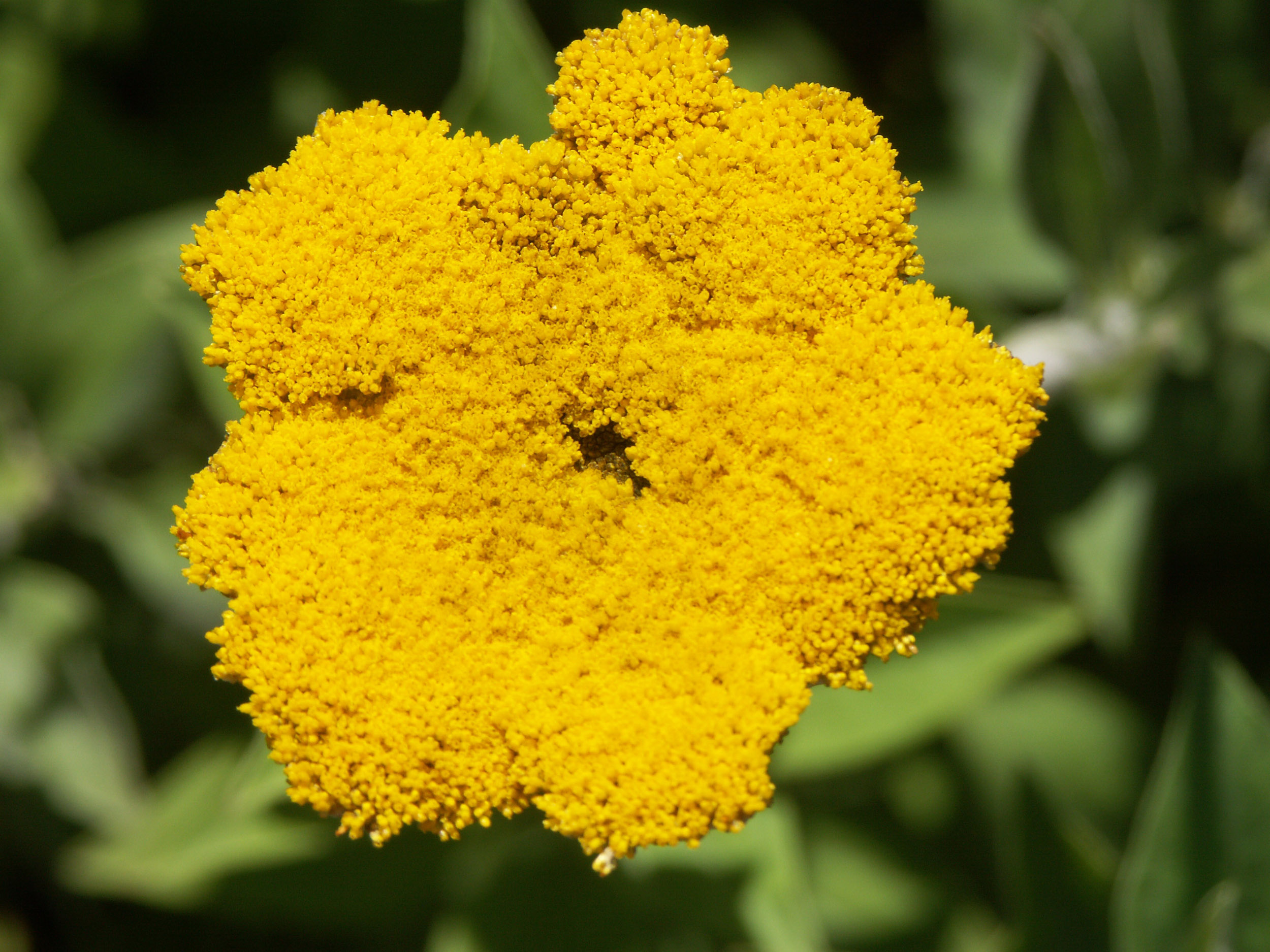
Helichrysum umbraculigerum

Elichrysum Proliferum (Proliferous Everlasting), botanical print from the Curtis's Botanical Magazine, 1822.
