= Leptorhynchos =

The genus Leptorhynchos may refer to:

- Leptorhynchos gaddisi, a dinosaur species in the family Caenagnathidae
- Leptorhynchos (plant), a plant genus in the family Asteraceae
