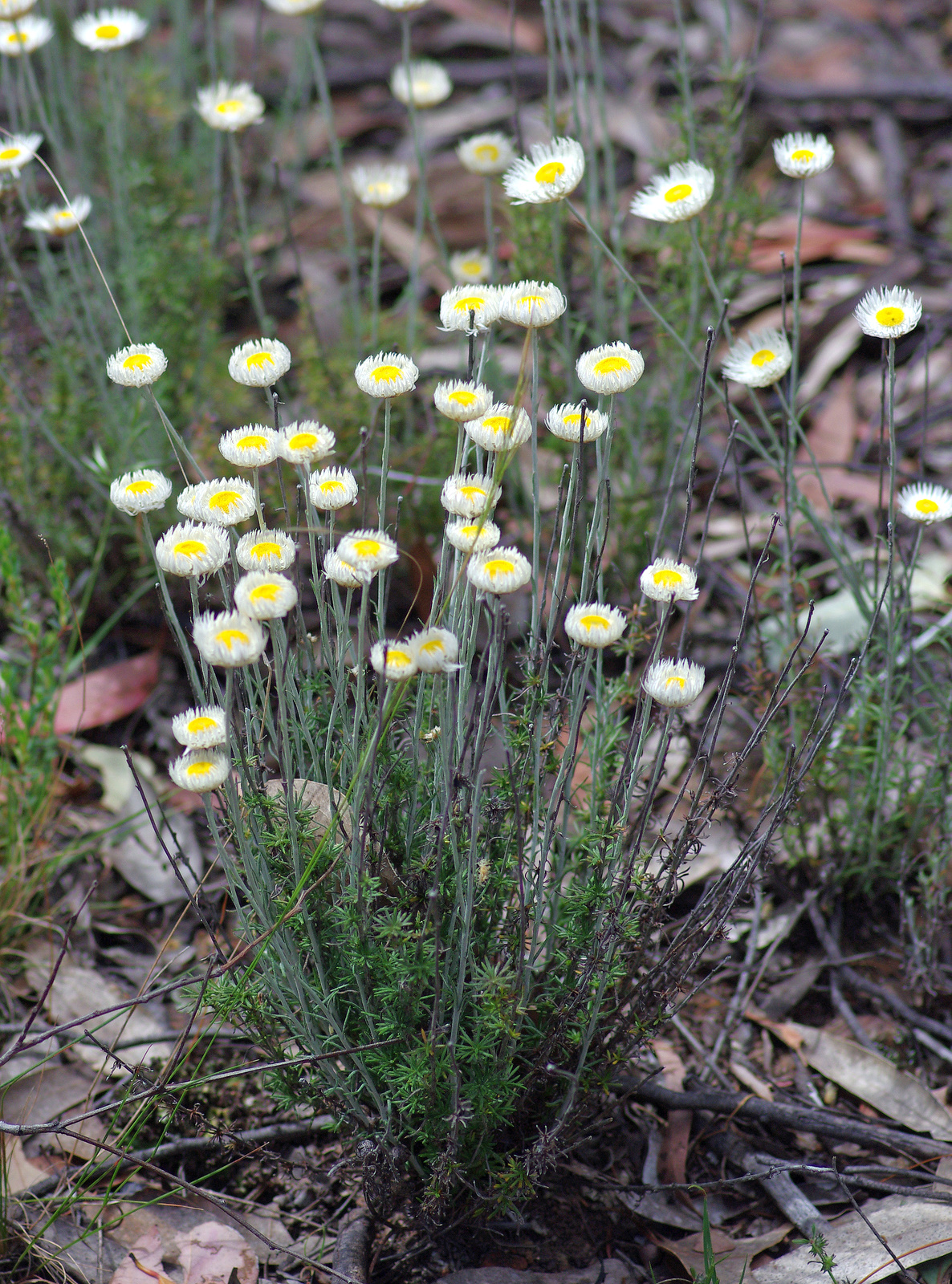

Scientific classification
- Kingdom: Plantae
- Clade: Tracheophytes
- Clade: Angiosperms
- Clade: Eudicots
- Clade: Asterids
- Order: Asterales
- Family: Asteraceae
- Genus: Chrysocephalum
- Species: C. baxteri

Binomial name
- Chrysocephalum baxteri (A.Cunn. ex DC.) Anderb.

Synonyms
- Helichrysum baxteri A.Cunn. ex DC.; Argyrophanes behrii Schltdl.; Chrysocephalum behrianum Sond.; Gnaphalium baxteri Sch.Bip.

= Chrysocephalum baxteri =

Fringed everlasting

Species of plant

Chrysocephalum baxteri, known by the common name fringed everlasting is a perennial herb native to southern Australia. It is a member of the Asteraceae, the daisy family. Found in low heath country and sclerophyll forest. A small plant, 10 to 40 cm high with many stems. Leaves are linear in shape, 4 to 30 mm long, 0.5 to 2.5 mm wide. Both leaf surfaces are a felty grey/green. White flowers mostly form in spring and summer.

Collected by William Baxter, this plant first appeared in scientific literature as Helichrysum baxteri in the Prodromus Systematis Naturalis Regni Vegetabilis of 1838 published by the Swiss botanist, Augustin Pyramus de Candolle.
