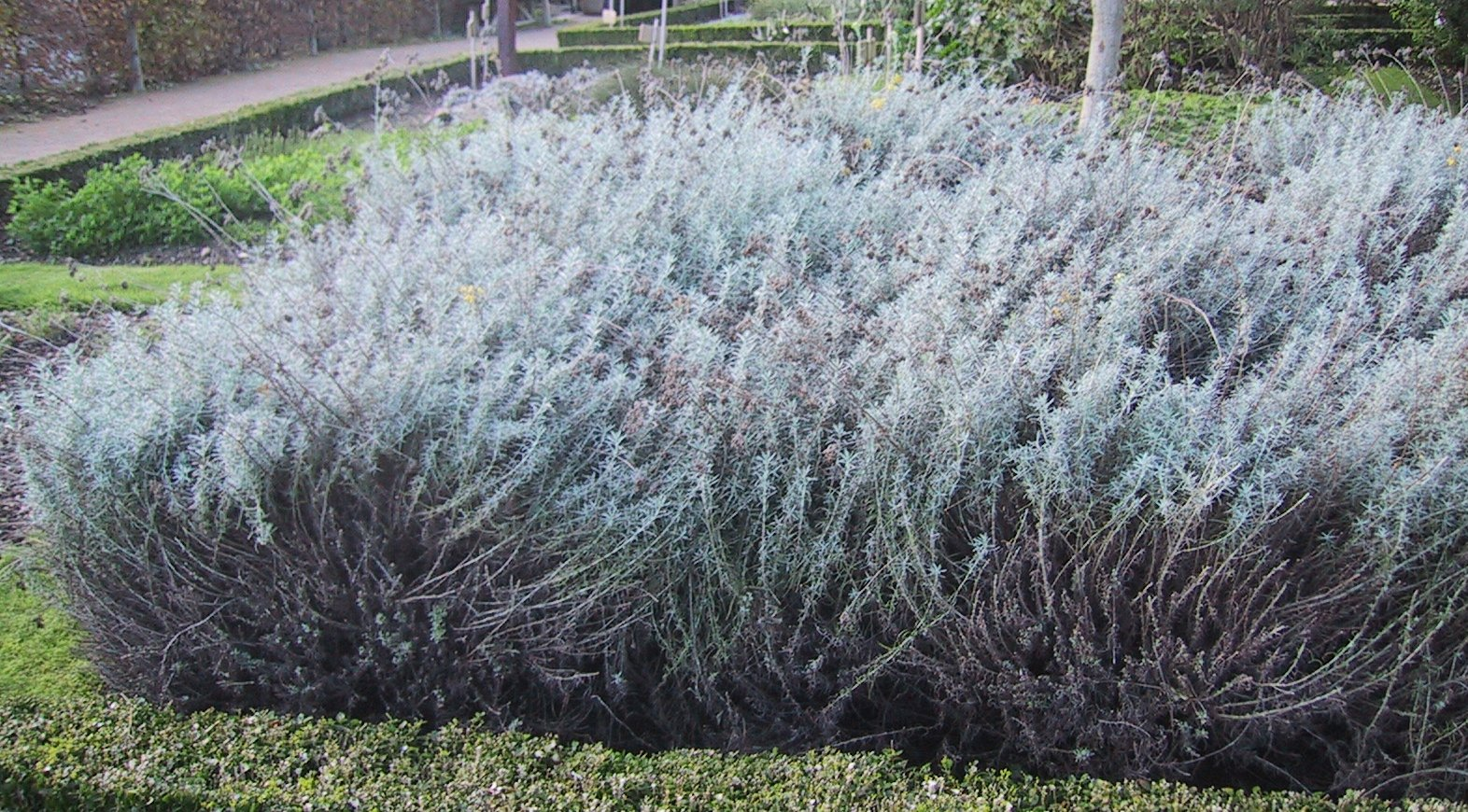

Scientific classification
- Kingdom: Plantae
- Clade: Tracheophytes
- Clade: Angiosperms
- Clade: Eudicots
- Clade: Asterids
- Order: Asterales
- Family: Asteraceae
- Genus: Helichrysum
- Species: H. italicum

Binomial name
- Helichrysum italicum (Roth) G. Don fil.

Synonyms
- Helichrysum angustifolium

= Helichrysum italicum =

Species of flowering plant

Helichrysum italicum is a species of flowering plant in the family Asteraceae. It is sometimes called the curry plant because of the strong fragrance of its leaves; other common names include Italian strawflower and immortelle. It grows on dry, rocky or sandy ground around the Mediterranean. The stems are woody at the base and can reach 60 centimetres (24 in) or more in height. The clusters of yellow flowers are produced in summer, retain their colour after picking, and are used in dried flower arrangements.

Helichrysum italicum is sometimes used as a spice. Although called "curry plant" and bearing the aroma of curry powder, it is not related to this mixture of spices nor the curry tree (Murraya koenigii), and is not used as masala for curry dishes. Rather, it has a resinous, somewhat bitter aroma reminiscent of sage or wormwood. Its young shoots and leaves are used in a stew of Mediterranean meat, fish, or vegetable dishes until they have imparted their flavour and removed before serving. The plant is reportedly used in traditional medicine in several European countries—particularly Italy, Spain, Portugal and Bosnia and Herzegovina—for the treatment of allergies, colds, cough, inflammation, infections and sleeplessness.

== Cultivation ==
Helichrysum italicum is a tender perennial (USDA Zones 7–10). It is propagated by rooting semi-hardwood cuttings in summer and overwintering in frost-free conditions.

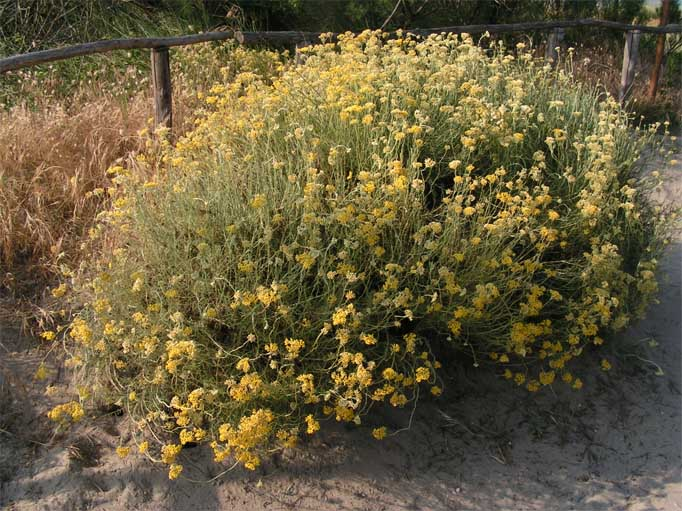
Helichrysum italicum

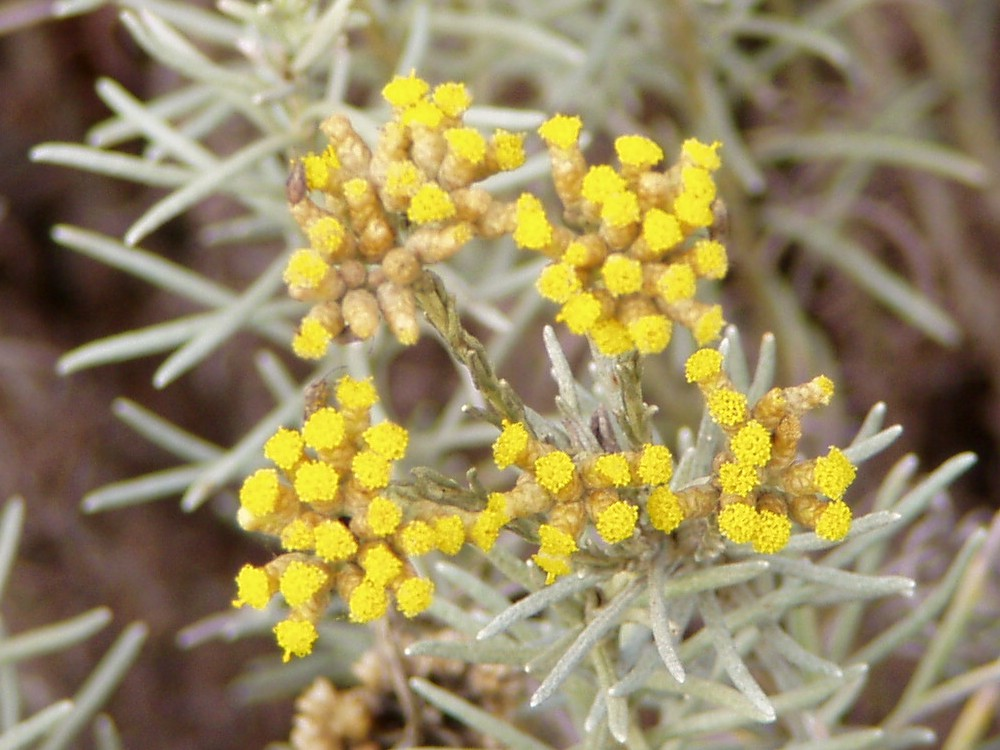
Helichrysum italicum flowering

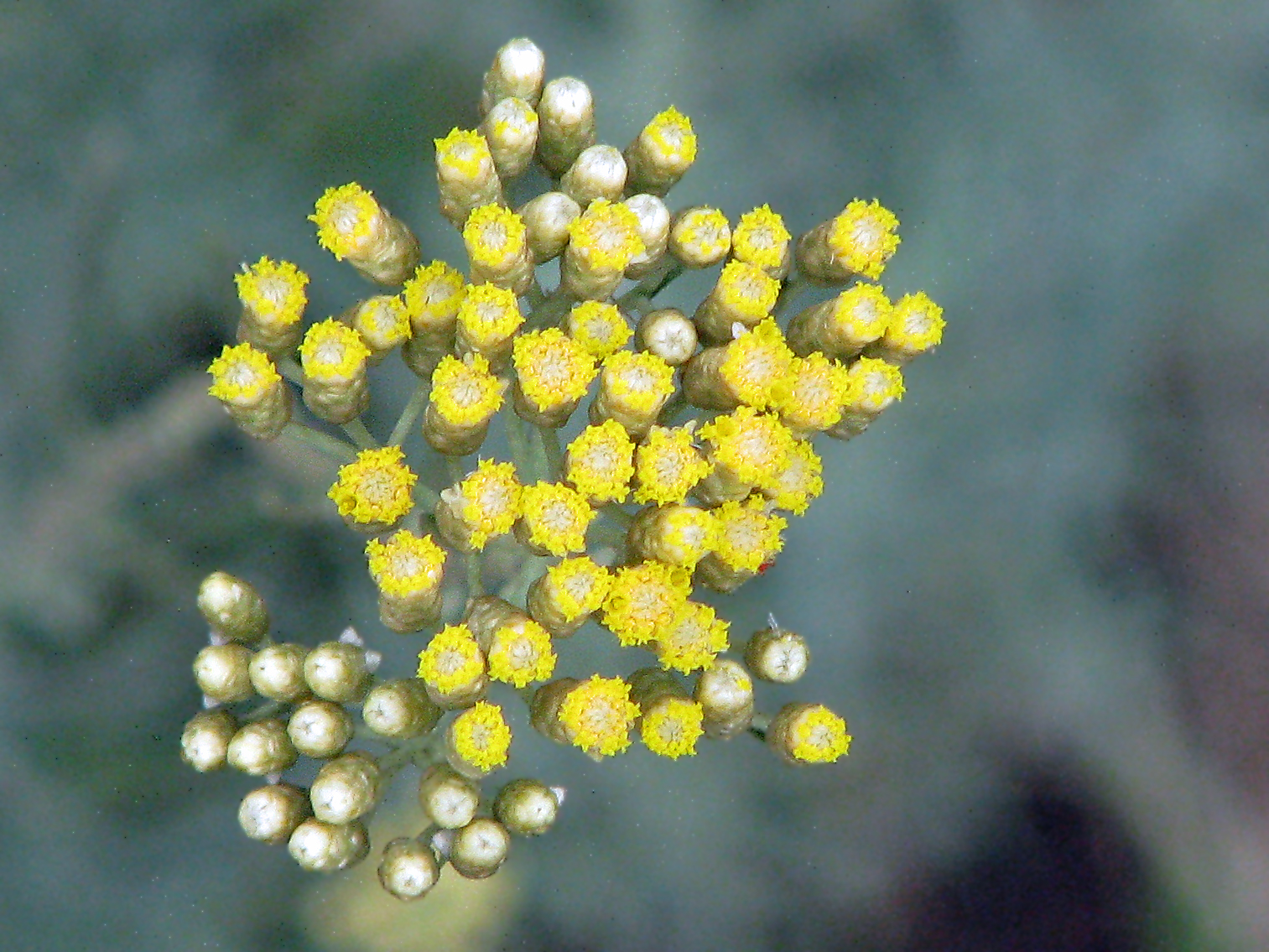
Close-up of inflorescences

== Sources ==
- Frances Tenenbaum (7 October 2003). Taylor's Encyclopedia of Garden Plants: The Most Authoritative Guide to the Best Flowers, Trees, and Shrubs for North American Gardens. Houghton Mifflin Harcourt. p. 189. ISBN 978-0-618-22644-3.
- Diana Miller (15 June 2008). 400 Trees and Shrubs for Small Spaces. Timber Press. p. 108. ISBN 978-0-88192-875-4.
- David Burnie (1995) Wild Flowers of the Mediterranean. ISBN 0-7513-2761-1
- T. G. Tutin et al. (1968) Flora Europaea, Volume 2. ISBN 0-521-06662-X
- J. Mastelić, O. Politeo and I. Jerković Contribution to the Analysis of the Essential Oil of Helichrysum italicum (Roth) G. Don. – Determination of Ester Bonded Acids and Phenols Molecules 2008, 13(4), 795-803 doi:10.3390/molecules13040795
