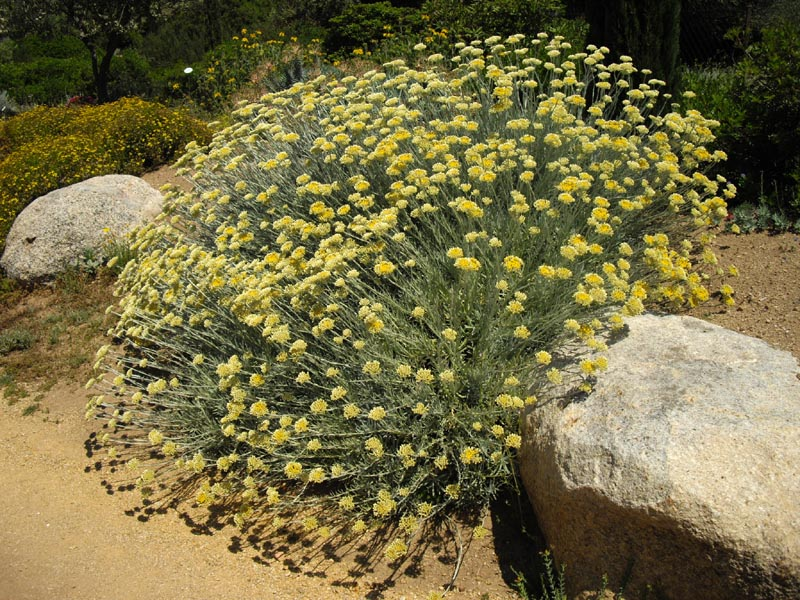

Scientific classification
- Kingdom: Plantae
- Clade: Tracheophytes
- Clade: Angiosperms
- Clade: Eudicots
- Clade: Asterids
- Order: Asterales
- Family: Asteraceae
- Genus: Helichrysum
- Species: H. orientale

Binomial name
- Helichrysum orientale (L.) Vaill.

= Helichrysum orientale =

Species of flowering plant

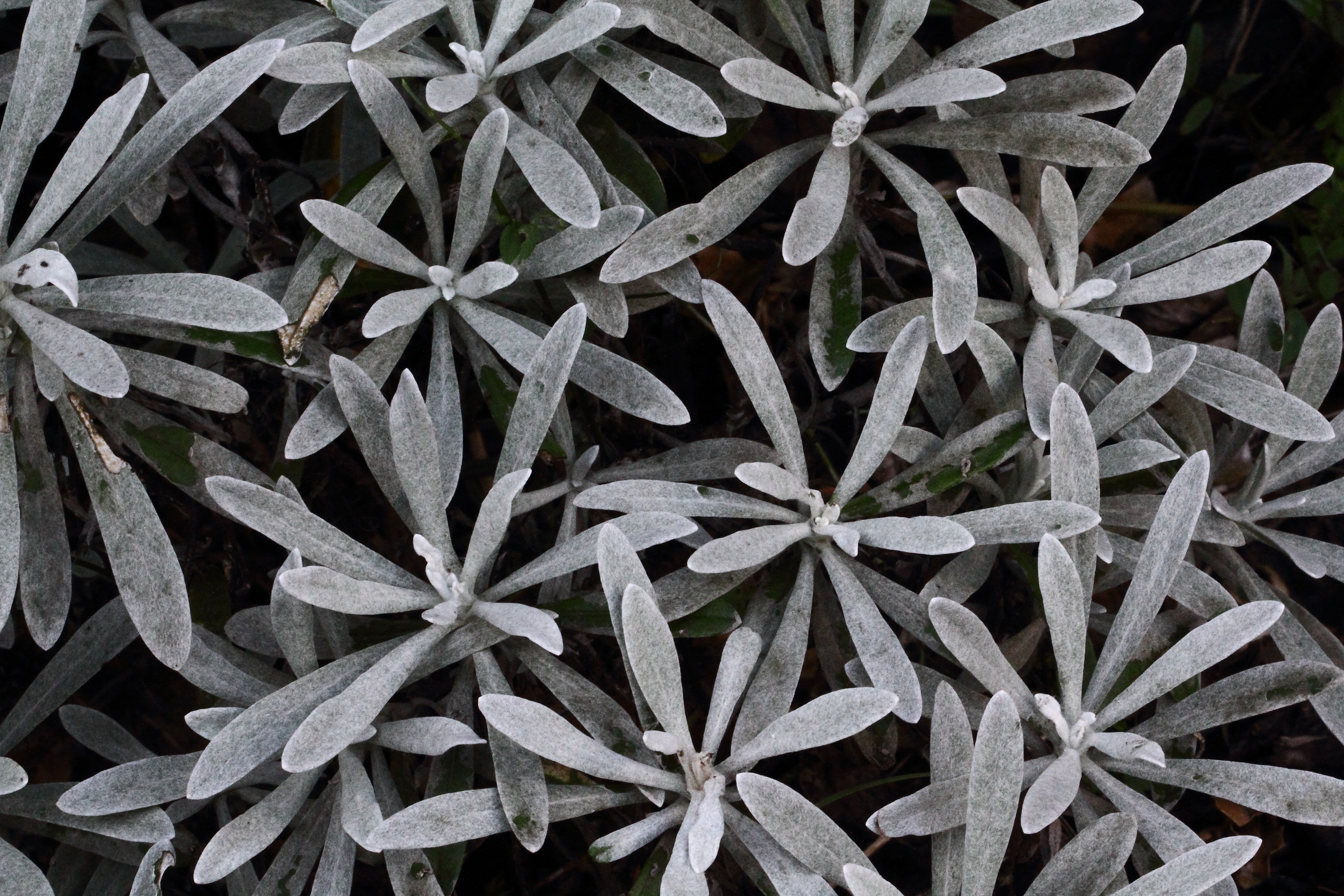
The gray ash foliage of the immortelle Helichrysum orientale

Helichrysum orientale, also known as everlasting and immortelle, is the type species for the genus Helichrysum. It is a native of North Africa, Crete, and parts of Asia bordering on the Mediterranean. It is cultivated in many parts of Europe. It first became known in Europe about the year 1629, and has been cultivated since 1815.

== Description ==
In common with several other plants of the genus Helichrysum, the immortelle plant possesses a large involucre of dry scale-like or scarious bracts, which preserve their appearance when dried, provided the plant be gathered in proper condition. The colour of the bracts is a deep yellow. The evergreen, downy, gray ash foliage becomes almost white in summer, making Helichrysum orientale an attractive plant for gardening.

== Sources ==
The chief supplies of Helichrysum orientale come from lower Provence, where it is cultivated in large quantities on the ground sloping to the Mediterranean, in positions well exposed to the sun, and usually in plots surrounded by dry stone walls. The finest flowers are grown on the slopes of Bandol and La Ciotat, where the plant begins to flower in June.

== Cultivation ==
Immortelle requires a light sandy or stony soil, and is very readily injured by rain or heavy dews. It can be propagated in quantity by means of offsets from the older stems. The flowering stems are gathered in June, when the bracts are fully developed, all the fully expanded and immature flowers being pulled off and rejected. A well-managed plantation is productive for eight or ten years. The plant is tufted in its growth, each plant producing 60 or 70 stems, while each stem produces an average of 20 flowers. About 400 such stems weigh a kilogramme. A hectare of ground will produce 40,000 plants, bearing from 2,400,000 to 2,800,000 stems, and weighing from 5½ to 6½ tons (2½ to 3 tons per acre).

== Uses ==
The natural flowers are commonly used for garlands for the dead, or plants dyed black are mixed with the yellow ones. The plant is also dyed green or orange-red, and thus employed for bouquets or other ornamental purposes.
