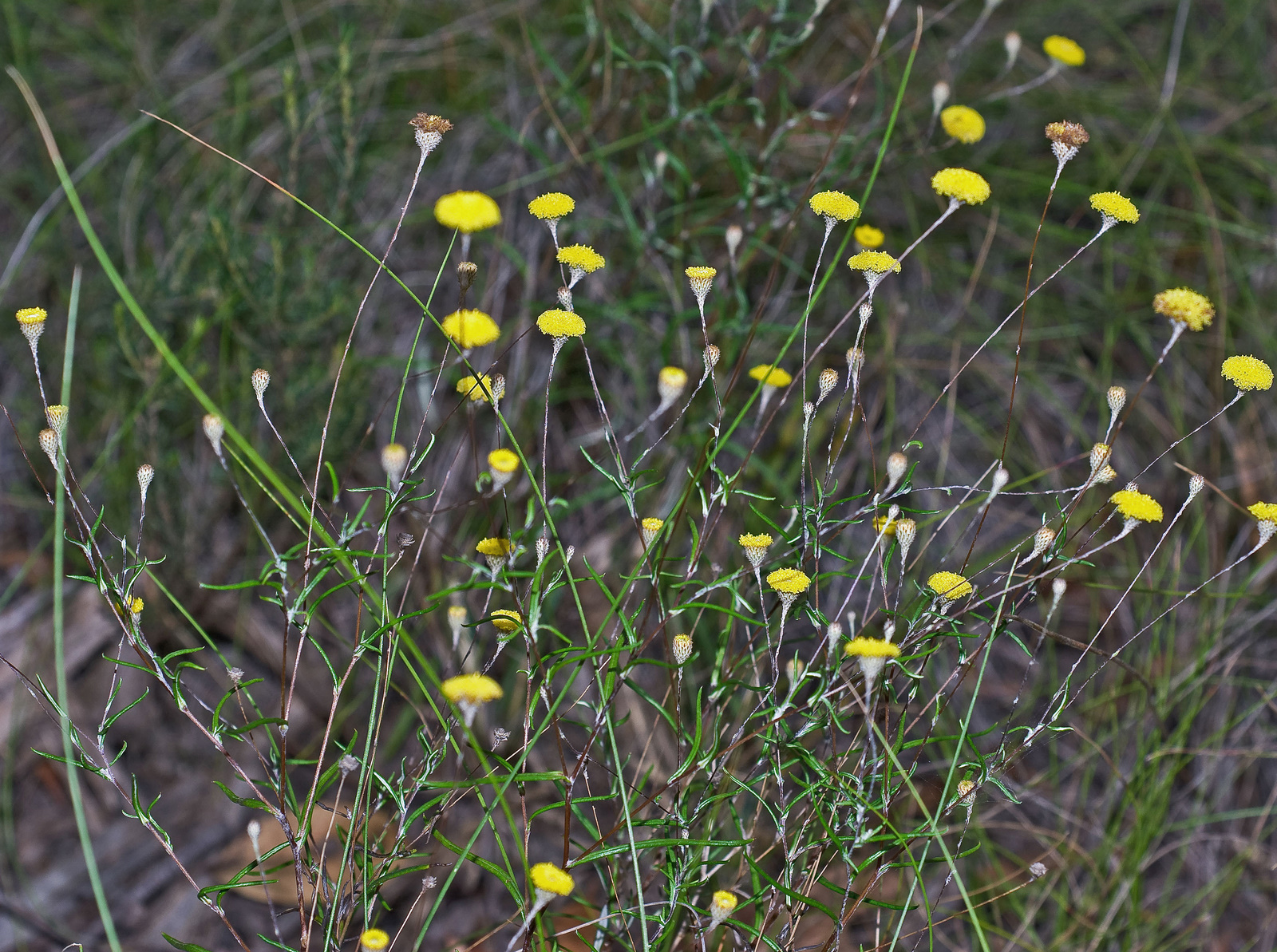

Scientific classification
- Kingdom: Plantae
- Clade: Tracheophytes
- Clade: Angiosperms
- Clade: Eudicots
- Clade: Asterids
- Order: Asterales
- Family: Asteraceae
- Genus: Leptorhynchos
- Species: L. tenuifolius

Binomial name
- Leptorhynchos tenuifolius F.Muell.

= Leptorhynchos tenuifolius =

Wiry buttons

Species of flowering plant

Leptorhynchos tenuifolius, commonly known as wiry buttons, is a species of flowering plant in the family Asteraceae. It is an upright to ascending herb, multi-branched and has yellow flowers and grows in Victoria and South Australia.

== Description ==
Leptorhynchos tenuifolius is a multi-stemmed upright to ascending multi-branched perennial, covered with soft hairs to smooth and 10–40 cm (3.9–15.7 in) high. Leaves are narrow, linear-shaped, pointed, margins recurved, 0.5–4 cm (0.20–1.57 in) long, 1 mm (0.039 in) wide, basal leaves longer and wider. The flower heads are oblong-cone shaped, about 5 mm (0.20 in) in diameter, outer involucral bracts clear with a brown tip, margins densely covered with spreading, soft hairs and the florets yellow. Flowering occurs from October to March and the fruit is a cypsela about 1 mm (0.039 in) long and smooth.

== Taxonomy and naming ==
Leptorhynchos tenuifolius was first formally described in 1858 by Ferdinand von Mueller and the description was published in Fragmenta Phytographiae Australiae. The specific epithet (tenuifolius) means "slender leaved".

== Distribution and habitat ==
Wiry buttons is a locally common species growing in a variety of situations including woodlands, forest and wet areas on sandy soils in Victoria and South Australia.
