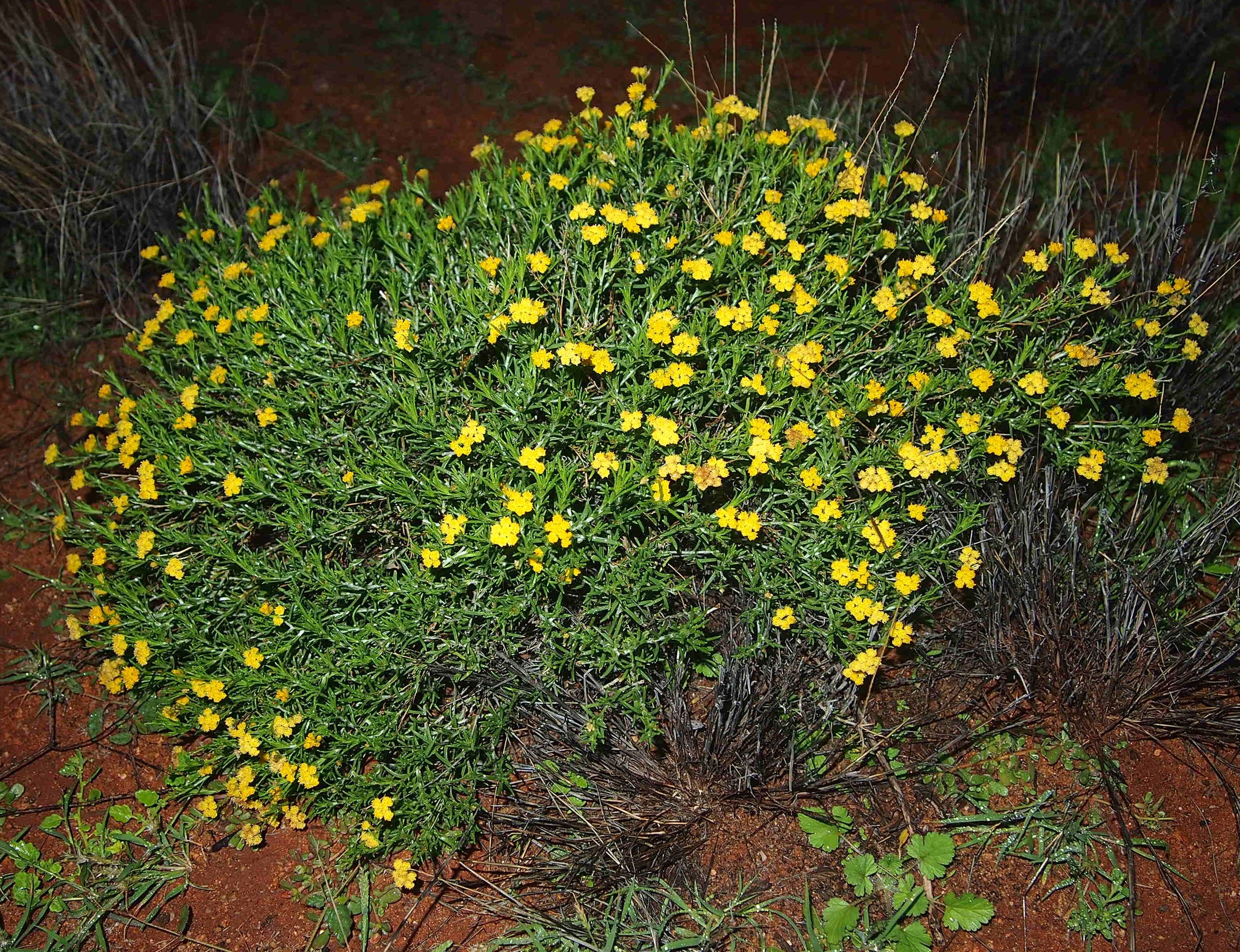

Scientific classification
- Kingdom: Plantae
- Clade: Tracheophytes
- Clade: Angiosperms
- Clade: Eudicots
- Clade: Asterids
- Order: Asterales
- Family: Asteraceae
- Genus: Chrysocephalum
- Species: C. pterochaetum

Binomial name
- Chrysocephalum pterochaetum F.Muell.

Synonyms
- Helipterum pterochaetum (F.Muell.) Benth.; Helichrysum pterochaetum (F.Muell.) F.Muell.

= Chrysocephalum pterochaetum =

Perennial sunray

Species of plant

Chrysocephalum pterochaetum, known by the common name perennial sunray is a perennial herb native to outback and desert areas of Australia. A member of the Asteraceae, the daisy family. A small plant, 15 to 40 cm high with many stems. Leaves are linear to linear oblanceolate in shape, 10 to 30 mm long, 1 to 1.5 mm wide. Leaf surfaces are rough and glandular, and may have felty white hairs. Yellow flowers mostly form throughout the year, but often seen from June to October. Originally collected in 1851 near Kanyaka, South Australia. The habitat of this plant includes sand among rocks, in or near dry creek beds, exposed rocky hill slopes and sandy gibber. The specific epithet pterochaetum is derived from the Ancient Greek language, ptero (winged) and chaetum (hair).
