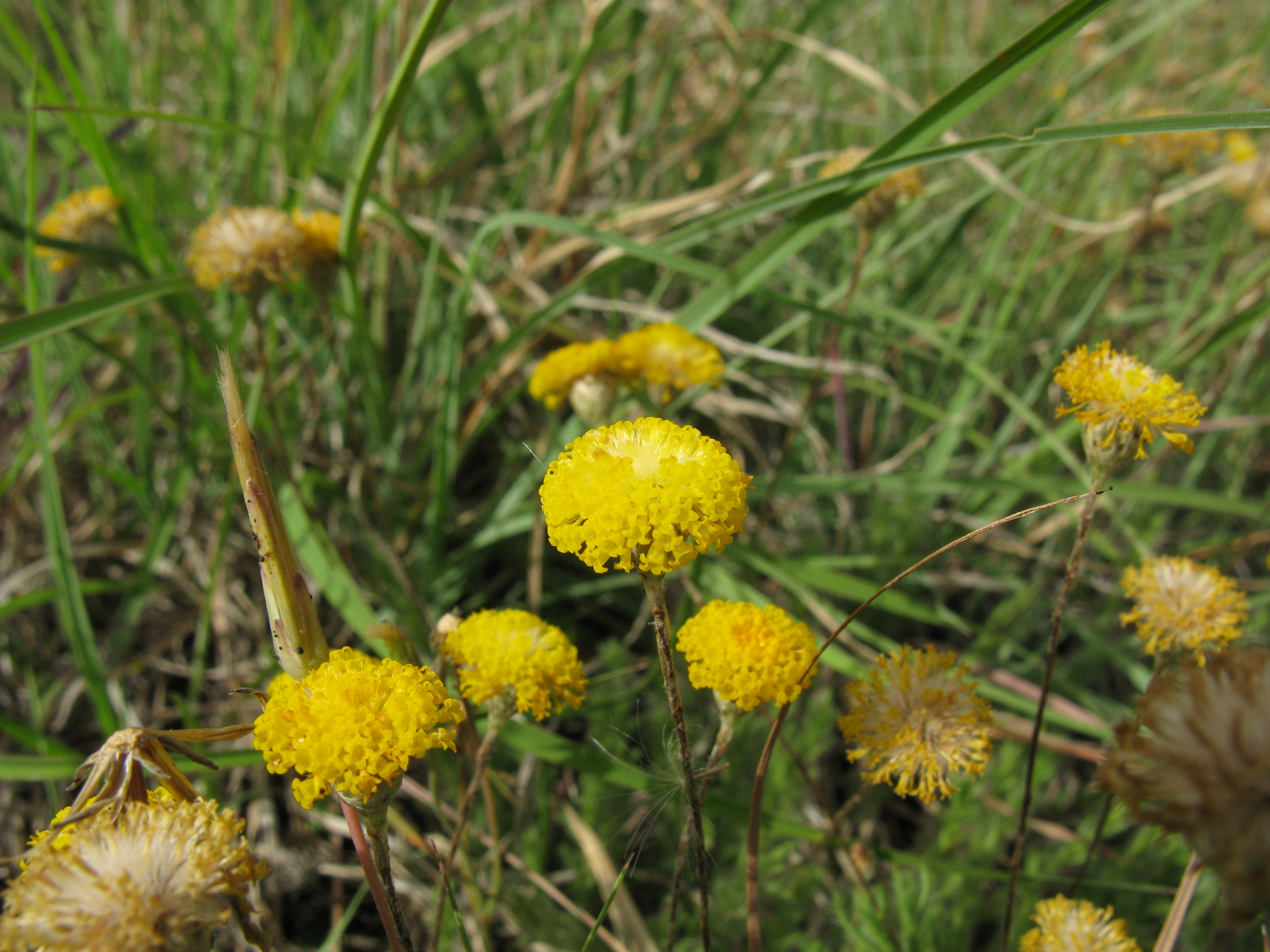

Scientific classification
- Kingdom: Plantae
- Clade: Tracheophytes
- Clade: Angiosperms
- Clade: Eudicots
- Clade: Asterids
- Order: Asterales
- Family: Asteraceae
- Genus: Leptorhynchos
- Species: L. squamatus

Binomial name
- Leptorhynchos squamatus (Labill.)Less.

= Leptorhynchos squamatus =

Scaly buttons

Species of flowering plant

Leptorhynchos squamatus, commonly known as scaly buttons, is a species of flowering plant in the family Asteraceae. It is an upright to ascending herb with variably shaped leaves and yellow flowers and grows in eastern Australia.

== Description ==
Leptorhynchos squamatus is an upright or ascending herb 10–40 cm (4–15.5 in) high, stems mostly simple, woolly to smooth and aging to reddish brown. Its leaves are oblong or narrowly oblong-lance shaped, 1.5–3.5 cm (0.59–1.38 in) long and 2–4 mm (0.079–0.157 in) wide. Leaf lower surface smooth or more or less covered sparsely in longish, coarse hairs, upper surface covered with soft, appressed, woolly hairs at the apex. The involucral bracts extend down the stalk of the inflorescence, mostly dry and scaly, clear or brownish. The flower heads are at the end of branches on a peduncle 5–15 cm (2.0–5.9 in) long, bell-shaped, 7–10 mm (0.28–0.39 in) long, 8–15 mm (0.31–0.59 in) in diameter and the florets yellow. Flowering occurs from summer to autumn and the fruit is an oblong to scythe-shaped achene.

== Taxonomy and naming ==
This species was described in 1806 by Jacques Labillardière who gave it the name Chrysocoma squamata and the description was published in Novae Hollandiae Plantarum Specimen. In 1832 Christian Friedrich Lessing changed the name to Leptorhynchos squamatus and the description was published in Synopsis Generum Compositarum. The specific epithet (squamatus) means "scaly".

== Distribution and habitat ==
Scaly buttons grows in a variety of situations including forest, mallee, bushland on clay and sandy soils in New South Wales, Victoria and Tasmania.
