= Leptorhynchos baileyi =

Scientific classification
- Kingdom: Plantae
- Clade: Tracheophytes
- Clade: Angiosperms
- Clade: Eudicots
- Clade: Asterids
- Order: Asterales
- Family: Asteraceae
- Genus: Leptorhynchos
- Species: L. baileyi

Binomial name
- Leptorhynchos baileyi F.Muell.

Synonyms
- Helichrysum basedowii J.M.Black; Leptorhynchos tetrachaetus var. penicillatus J.M.Black; Leptorrhynchos baileyi F.Muell. orth. var.; Leptorrhynchus baileyi F.Muell. orth. var.; Leptorrhynchus tetrachaetus var. penicillatus J.M.Black orth. var.; Leptorhynchos tetrachaetus auct. non (Schltdl.) J.M.Black

Species of flowering plant

Leptorhynchos baileyi, commonly known as woolly buttons, is a species of flowering plant in the family Asteraceae. It is an erect to ascending annual herb with linear leaves and yellow flowers.

The species was first described in 1877 by Ferdinand von Mueller in his Fragmenta Phytographiae Australiae from specimens collected by Frederick Manson Bailey near Mount Abundance.
