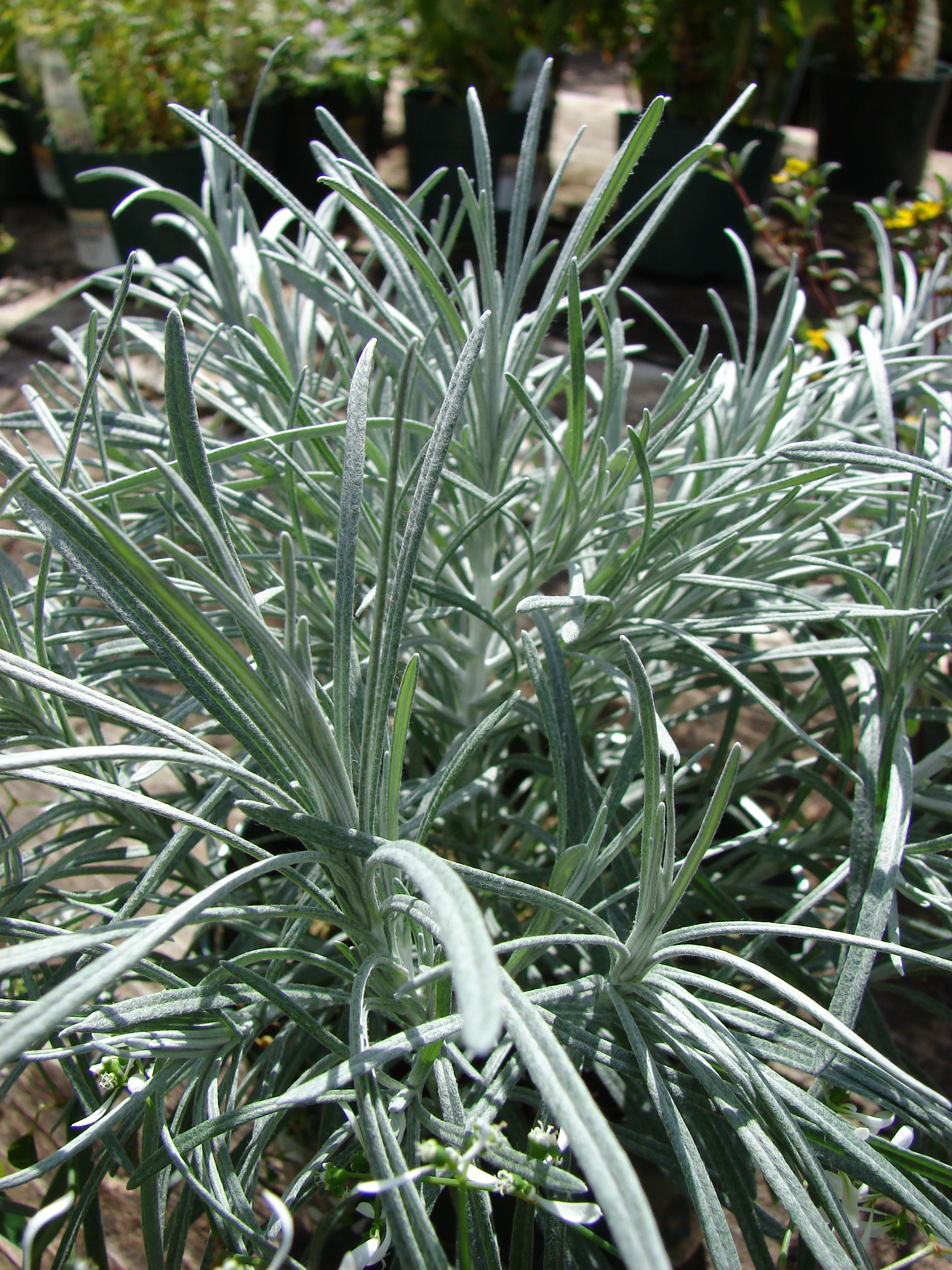
- Helichrysum thianschanicum 'Icicles'

Scientific classification
- Kingdom: Plantae
- Clade: Tracheophytes
- Clade: Angiosperms
- Clade: Eudicots
- Clade: Asterids
- Order: Asterales
- Family: Asteraceae
- Genus: Helichrysum
- Species: H. thianschanicum

Binomial name
- Helichrysum thianschanicum Regel

Synonyms
- Helichrysum arenarium var. kokanicum Regel & Schmalh.; Helichrysum kokanicum (Regel & Schmalh.) Krasch. & Gontsch.; Helichrysum thianschanicum var. aureum O. Fedtsch. & B. Fedtsch.

= Helichrysum thianschanicum =

Species of shrub

Helichrysum thianschanicum is a species of flowering plant in the family Asteraceae. It is commonly known as silver spike or icicle plant. It is part of a large genus of over 500 species.

== Description ==
Helichrysum thianschanicum is a small perennial shrub that grows 2 ft (61 cm) tall and wide. It resembles a lavender plant with basal branching and erect stems and is covered with 2 in (5 cm) long linear leaves that are covered with white pubescence. Yellow clusters of flowers are produced at the ends of stems during the summer. Up to 30 yellow, 1/3 in (8 mm) florets are in each cluster. In its native habitat, H. thianschanicum develops a finger-sized rhizome.

== Taxonomy ==
Helichrysum thianschanicum was first described in 1880 by Eduard August von Regel. The specific epithet refers to the Tian Shan mountain range of Central Asia.

== Distribution ==
Helichrysum thianschanicum grows on gravelly slopes and sand dunes in its native range of western China (Xinjiang) and adjacent Kazakhstan.

== Uses ==
=== Cultivars ===
Helichrysum thianschanicum 'Icicles' is a cultivar commonly grown in the United States for its foliage. During the summer, yellow flowers are produced at the ends of the stems and are composed of up to 30 florets. They are not spectacular but do accent the gray-white foliage. H. thianschanicum is a perennial that originates from a mountain range with hot dry summers and cold dry winters and is difficult to grow in wetter climates. 'Icicles' is usually grown as an annual plant in gardens. It seems resistant to most insect problems.

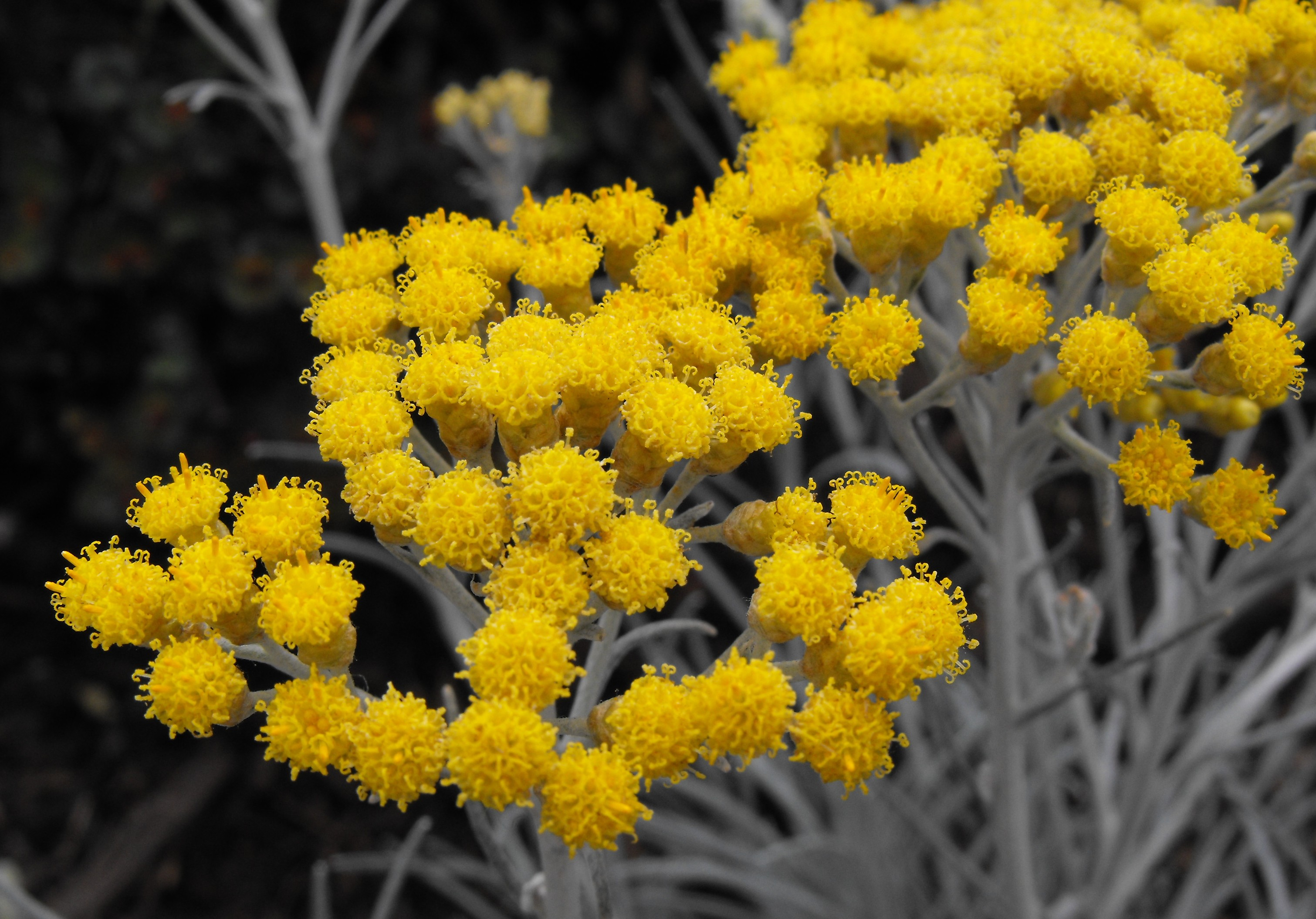
Helichrysum thianschanicum 'Icicles' flowers

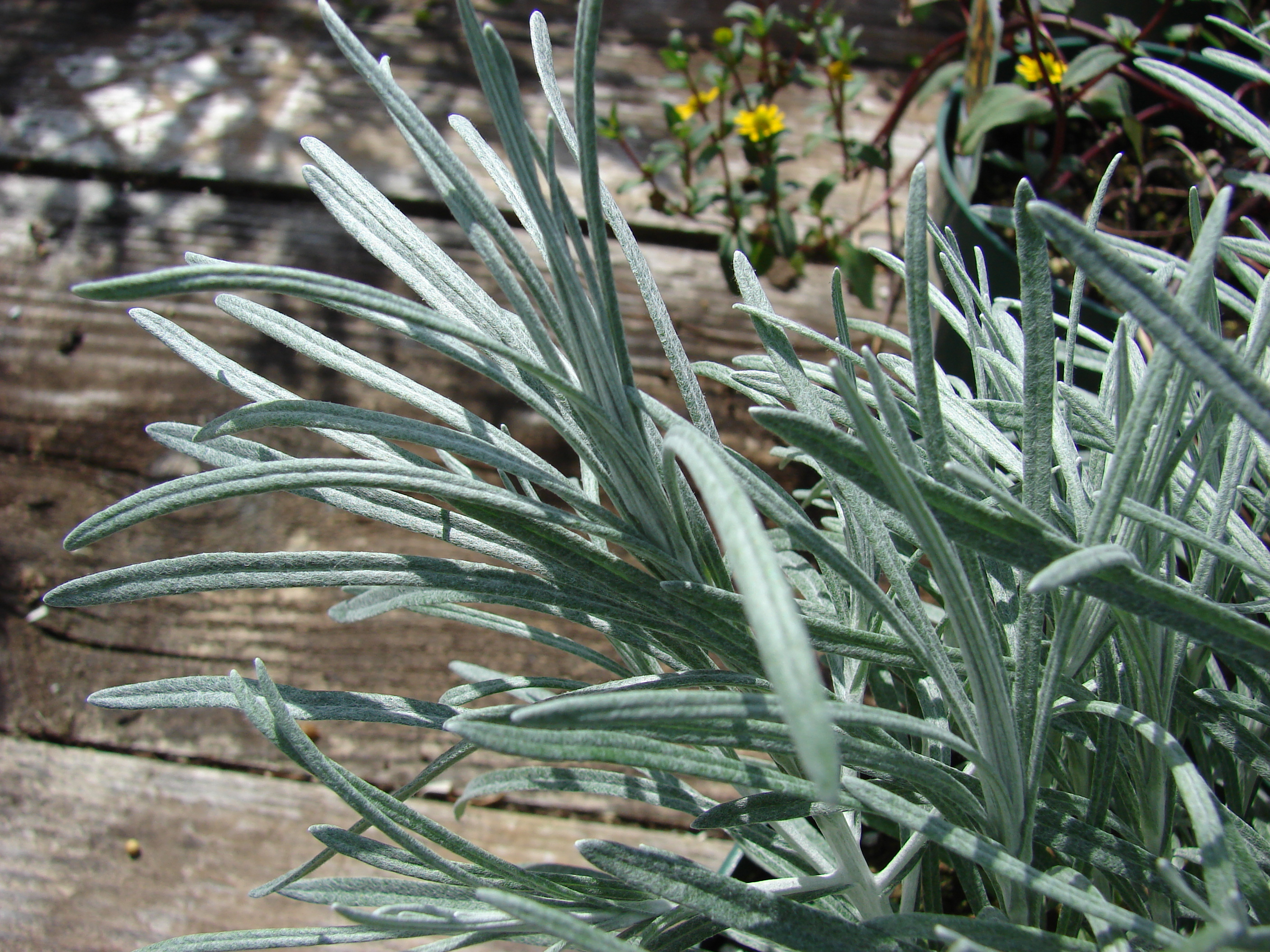
Helichrysum thianschanicum 'Icicles' foliage
