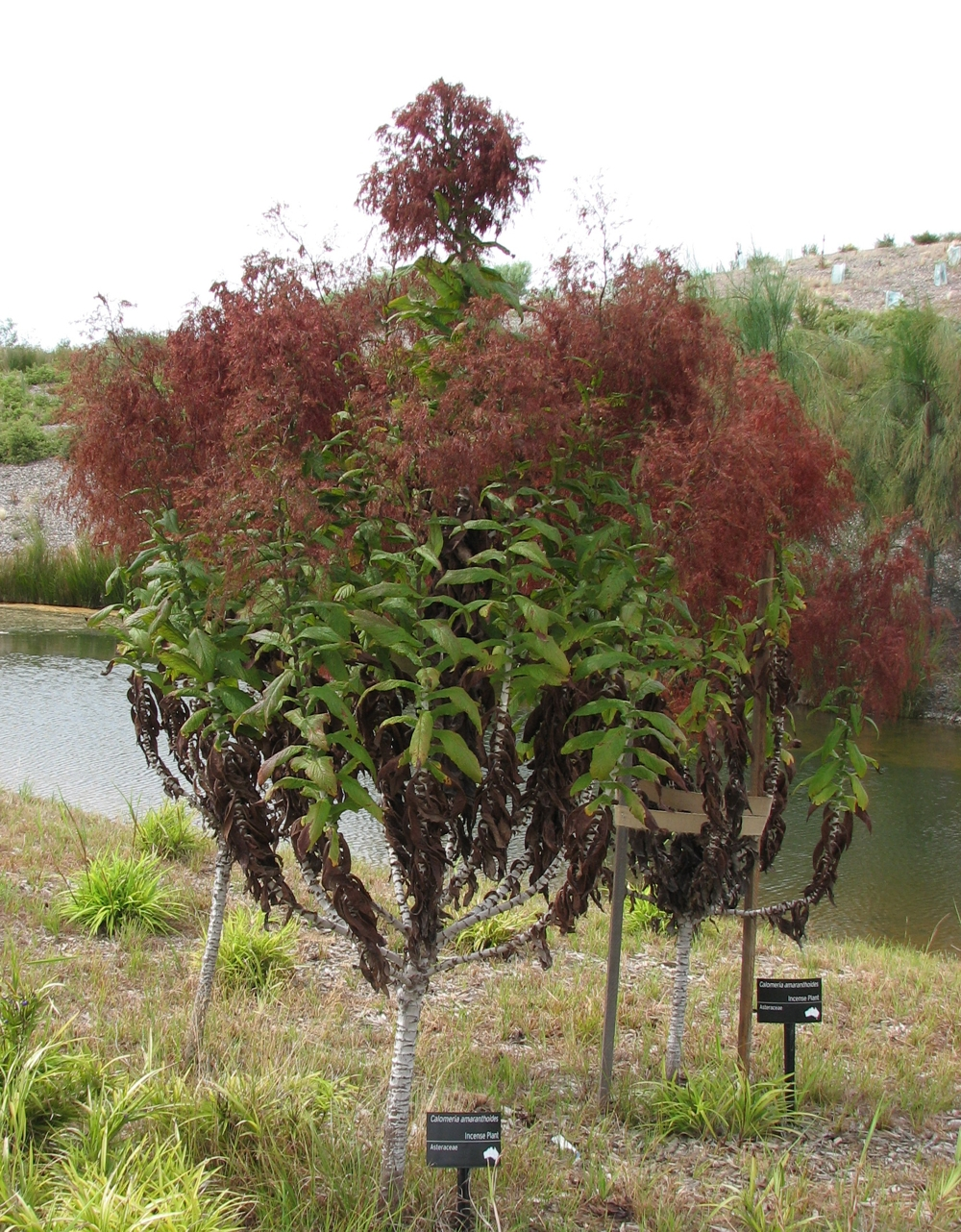

Scientific classification
- Kingdom: Plantae
- Clade: Tracheophytes
- Clade: Angiosperms
- Clade: Eudicots
- Clade: Asterids
- Order: Asterales
- Family: Asteraceae
- Genus: Calomeria
- Species: C. amaranthoides

Binomial name
- Calomeria amaranthoides Vent.

= Calomeria amaranthoides =

Species of flowering plant

Calomeria amaranthoides, the incense plant, is a plant species which is native to New South Wales and Victoria in Australia.

== Description ==
Calomeria amaranthoides is a tall, fragrant biennial herb, growing to 3.5 metres in height. It has sticky stems and leaves which are green above and whitish beneath and are up to 15 cm long and 5 cm wide. Its flowers appear in large brown to red plumes in the summer (January to April in its native range).
