= Thiseltonia =

Scientific classification
- Kingdom: Plantae
- Clade: Embryophytes
- Clade: Tracheophytes
- Clade: Spermatophytes
- Clade: Angiosperms
- Clade: Eudicots
- Clade: Asterids
- Order: Asterales
- Family: Asteraceae
- Subfamily: Asteroideae
- Tribe: Gnaphalieae
- Genus: Thiseltonia; Hemsl.
- Species: T. gracillima

Binomial name
- Thiseltonia gracillima (F.Muell. & Tate) Paul G.Wilson

Synonyms
- Humea gracillima F.Muell. & Tate; Calomeria gracillima (F.Muell. & Tate) Heine; Thiseltonia dyeri Hemsl.

Genus of plants

Thiseltonia is a genus of Australian plants in the daisy family Asteraceae. It is placed in the pussy's-toes tribe Gnaphalieae. As of June 2023, the Global Compositae Database and Florabase accepted only one species, Thiseltonia gracillima, native to Western Australia, and regarded Thiseltonia dyeri as a synonym, while Plants of the World Online accepted Thiseltonia dyeri as a separate species.
