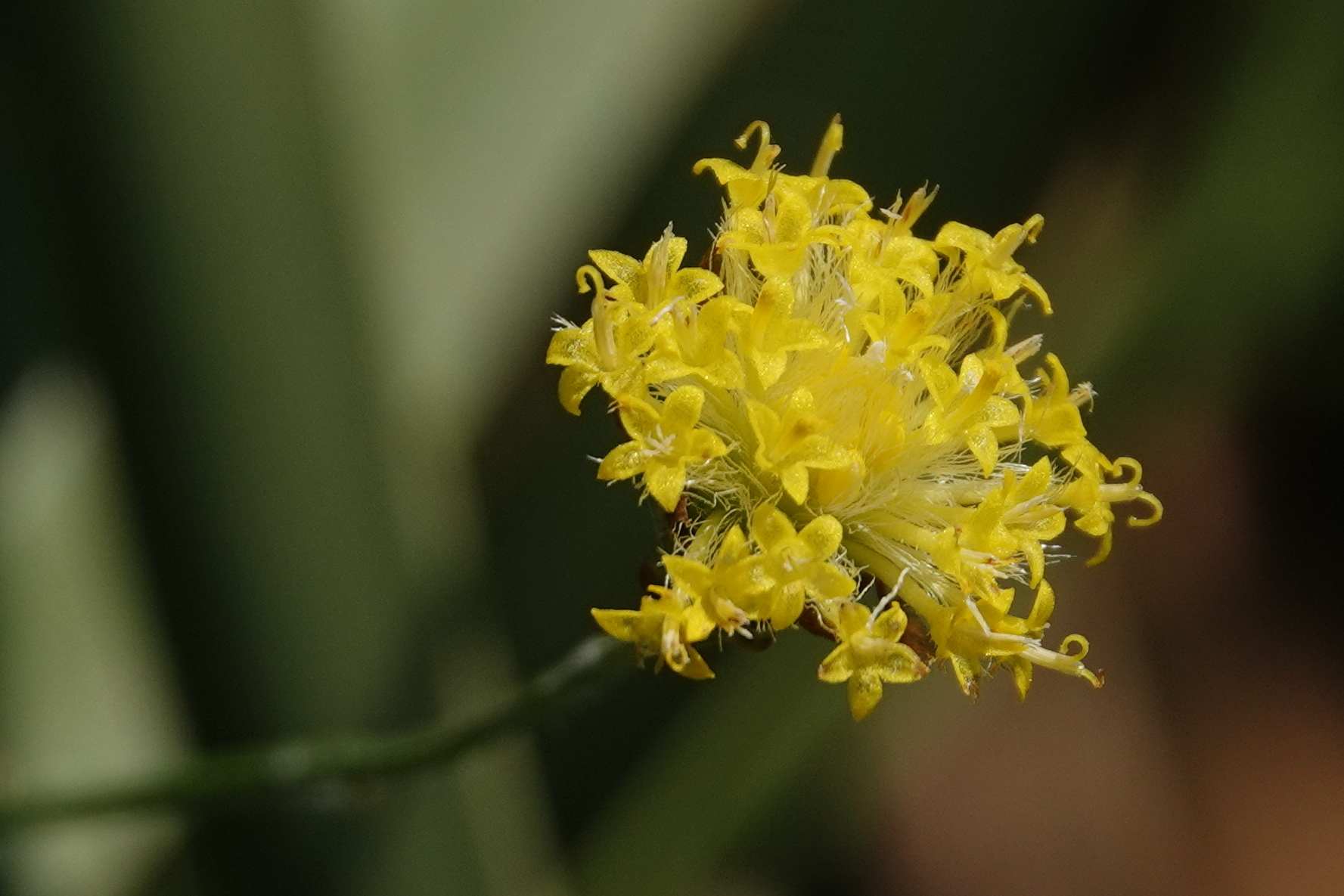
- Leptorhynchos nitidulus

Scientific classification
- Kingdom: Plantae
- Clade: Tracheophytes
- Clade: Angiosperms
- Clade: Eudicots
- Clade: Asterids
- Order: Asterales
- Family: Asteraceae
- Subfamily: Asteroideae
- Tribe: Gnaphalieae
- Genus: Leptorhynchos; Less.

Synonyms
- List: Doratolepis (Benth.) Schltdl.; Helichrysum sect. Leptorhynchos (Less.) Baill.; Helichrysum sect. Leptorhynchus Baill. orth. var.; Leptorhynchos a. Aphanorhynchos Endl. nom. inval.; Leptorhynchos sect. Aphanorhynchos DC. nom. inval.; Leptorhynchus Benth. orth. var.; Leptorrhynchos DC. orth. var.; Leptorrhynchus F.Muell. orth. var.; Podolepis sect. Doratolepis Benth.; Tetrachaeta F.Muell.

= Leptorhynchos (plant) =

Genus of flowering plants

Leptorhynchos is a genus of annual or perennial herbs in the family Asteraceae. All species are endemic to Australia.

== Species list ==
The following is a list of species of Leptorhynchos accepted by the Australian Plant Census as at April 2024:

- Leptorhynchos baileyi F.Muell. - woolly buttons
- Leptorhynchos elongatus DC. - lanky buttons
- Leptorhynchos melanocarpus Paul G.Wilson
- Leptorhynchos nitidulus DC.
- Leptorhynchos orientalis Paul G.Wilson
- Leptorhynchos scaber (Benth.) Haegi
- Leptorhynchos squamatus (Labill.) Less. – scaly buttons
  - Leptorhynchos squamatus subsp. alpinus Flann
  - Leptorhynchos squamatus (Labill.) Less. subsp. squamatus
- Leptorhynchos tenuifolius F.Muell.
- Leptorhynchos tetrachaetus (Schldl.) J.M.Black - beauty buttons
- Leptorhynchos waitzia Sond. - button immortelle
