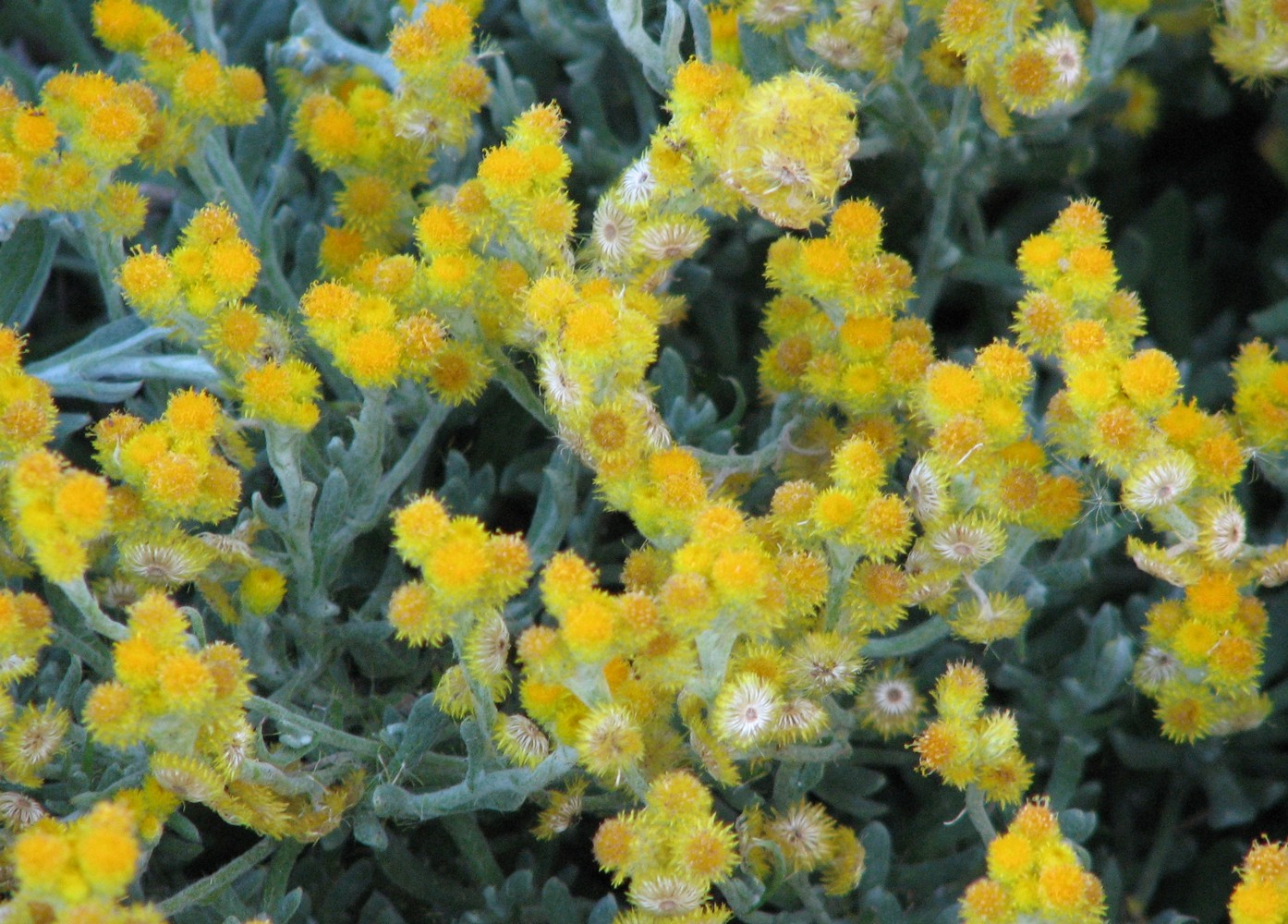

Scientific classification
- Kingdom: Plantae
- Clade: Tracheophytes
- Clade: Angiosperms
- Clade: Eudicots
- Clade: Asterids
- Order: Asterales
- Family: Asteraceae
- Genus: Chrysocephalum
- Species: C. apiculatum

Binomial name
- Chrysocephalum apiculatum (Labill.) Steetz

Synonyms
- Argyrocome apiculata Cass.; Chrysocephalum canescens Turcz.; Chrysocephalum flavissimum (Spreng.) Steetz; Chrysocephalum glabratum Turcz.; Chrysocephalum helichrysoides Walp.; Chrysocephalum odorum (DC.) Walp.; Chrysocephalum squarrulosum (DC.) Steetz; Gnaphalium apiculatum Labill.; Gnaphalium aureum Hort. ex Spreng.; Gnaphalium odorum (DC.) Sch.Bip.; Helichrysum apiculatum (Labill.) D.Don; Helichrysum eremaeum Haegi; Helichrysum ramosissimum Hook.; Helichrysum semiamplexicaule Domin

= Chrysocephalum apiculatum =

Species of plant

Chrysocephalum apiculatum, known by the common names common everlasting and yellow buttons, is a perennial herb native to southern Australia. It is a member of the Asteraceae, the daisy family. The name "everlasting" was inspired by its use as a long-lasting cut flower. It is increasing in popularity in Australia as a cottage garden plant, but is still not well known.

== Description ==
The common everlasting grows to around 40 centimeters high, with spreading horizontal stems that turn upwards as they get longer. The elongated silvery grey leaves clasp tightly to the stems and are covered in fine, silky hairs. The flower heads are yellow in color and spherical in shape, around 1 centimeter in diameter each, and often borne in clusters. The florets are minute. Like many daisies, it has seeds which are gradually dispersed on the wind. The seed germinates readily, but has a short viable life.

== Habitat ==
The plant grows in full sun on light, well-drained soil in grassy areas. It can tolerate moderately salty wind and dry conditions. Severe pruning will also rejuvenate old plants. It is an important food plant for the Australian painted lady (Vanessa kershawi), a butterfly.

== Taxonomy ==
Chrysocephalum apiculatum was first described as Gnaphalium apiculatum by Jacques Labillardière in 1806, but was transferred to the genus, Chrysocephalum, by Joachim Steetz in 1845.
