= Humeocline =

Scientific classification
- Kingdom: Plantae
- Clade: Tracheophytes
- Clade: Angiosperms
- Clade: Eudicots
- Clade: Asterids
- Order: Asterales
- Family: Asteraceae
- Subfamily: Asteroideae
- Tribe: Gnaphalieae
- Genus: Humeocline; Anderb.
- Species: H. madagascariensis

Binomial name
- Humeocline madagascariensis (Humbert) Anderb.

Synonyms
- [umea madagascariensis Humbert; Calomeria madagascariensis (Humbert) Heine

Genus of flowering plants

Humeocline is a genus of plants in the family Asteraceae, endemic to Madagascar.

Species

There is only one known species, Humeocline madagascariensis.
