= R334 (South Africa) =

Road in Eastern Cape, South Africa

Regional route R334
- R334 route map

Route information
- Length: 55 km (34 mi)

Major junctions
- West end: R102 west of Gqeberha
- M10 in Uitenhage; M6 in Uitenhage; R75 in Uitenhage; R335 in Motherwell; R102 near Coega
- East end: N2 near Coega

Location
- Country: South Africa
- Major cities: Uitenhage

Highway system
- Numbered routes of South Africa
← R332	→ R335

The R334 is a Regional Route in the Nelson Mandela Bay Metropolitan Municipality of South Africa that connects the N2 west of Gqeberha to the N2 at Coega north of Gqeberha via Uitenhage. The middle section of the route is also designated as the M20 metropolitan route.

M20 Metropolitan Route

== Route ==
The R334 begins at a junction with the N2 national route north-east of Gqeberha (7.5 km south-west of Colchester), heading west-south-west. It is initially co-signed with the R102 for 10 kilometres before the R334 becomes its own road westwards named Daniel Pienaar Street. It runs through the northern parts of Motherwell, where it forms a four-way-junction with the R335.

16 kilometres after the R335 junction, the R334 crosses the R75 to enter Uitenhage (Kariega). It reaches a t-junction with Graaff-Reinet Street, where the R334 becomes Graaff-Reinet Street southwards and enters the Uitenhage town centre. It meets the north-western origin of the M6 at the Caledon Street junction, where it becomes Caledon Street westwards before becoming Cuyler Street southwards and meeting the northern origin of the M10.

It leaves the town to the south-west, crossing the Swartkops River to become Cape Road and passing the township of KwaNobuhle. It ends at a junction with the R102 to the west of Gqeberha (east of Van Stadens Wild Flower Reserve), near an interchange with the N2.
