= Ibhayi =

Township in the Eastern Cape, South Africa

iBhayi
- Location within Eastern Cape Location within South Africa Location within Africa
- Coordinates: 33.872°S 25.571°E
- Country: South Africa
- Province: Eastern Cape
- Municipality: Nelson Mandela Bay

Area
  - Total: 36.06 km^{2} (13.92 sq mi)

Population (2011)
  - Total: 237,799
  - Density: 6,595/km^{2} (17,080/sq mi)

Racial makeup (2011)
  - Black African: 98.6%
  - Coloured: 0.9%
  - Indian/Asian: 0.1%
  - White: 0.1%
  - Other: 0.3%

First languages (2011)
  - Xhosa: 91.5%
  - English: 3.4%
  - Afrikaans: 1.5%
  - Other: 3.5%
- Time zone: UTC+2 (SAST)
- Postal code (street): 6001

iBhayi is a large township near Gqeberha, South Africa. It is the largest township in the Eastern Cape province and the ninth largest in South Africa after Mitchells Plain near Cape Town in the Western Cape.

In January 2023 a residential home in the iBhayi township of KwaZakhele was the scene of the 2023 Gqeberha mass shooting.

== Etymology ==
iBhayi (sometimes eBhayi) is a Xhosa word meaning "the bay". Although iBhayi is the name used for the collection of predominantly black townships north of Gqeberha, it is also used as a name for the city amongst Xhosa-speaking people.

== Geography ==
iBhayi is a collection of predominantly black townships situated north of the city of Gqeberha, similar to how Soweto, south-west of Johannesburg is also a collection of predominantly black townships.

Most of iBhayi lies east of the R75 except for its northern extensions of KwaDwesi, New KwaDwesi and Masibulele which lie west of the R75.

iBhayi is surrounded by the predominantly Coloured township of Bethelsdorp and the neighbourhood of Algoa Park in the west, Redhouse and Perseverance in the north-east, Swartkops in the east and Deal Party in the south-east.

The main roads in iBhayi are the R75 to Uitenhage and Despatch in the north and Gqeberha in the south and the R367/M19 to Despatch in the north and Swartkops in the south.

New Brighton has been in existence since the region was still farmland and is one of the biggest and oldest settled townships in Ibhayi, while KwaMagxaki township, which was established in 1985, is the second-highest income black suburb. KwaMagxaki is home to a diversified group of professionals, businesspeople and civil servants.

== Subdivisions ==
- Joe Slovo
- KwaDwesi / New KwaDwesi
- KwaMagxaki
- KwaZakhele
- Masibulele
- New Brighton
- Soweto on Sea
- Struandale Industrial
- Zwide
- Motherwell

The Ubuntu Education Fund is based in Zwide, and operates a community centre which opened in 2010.

== Industries ==
The Struandale industrial area is a popular industrial node in Nelson Mandela Bay located east of New Brighton and is often considered part of New Brighton.

Notable companies in Struandale include Distell Distribution, DSV Pharmacare, BASF, MW Wheels, Eveready, and most importantly the Isuzu automotive manufacturing plant and Ford engine manufacturing plant.

Continental Tyre and PPC Cement have manufacturing plants in New Brighton.

== Demographics (2011) ==
- Area: 36.06 square kilometres (13.92 sq mi)
- Population: 237,799: 6,594 inhabitants per square kilometre (17,080/sq mi)
- Households: 63,474: 1,760 per square kilometre (4,600/sq mi)

Gender	Population	%
Female	124,569	52.38
Male	113,230	47.62

Race	Population	%
Black	234,531	98.63
White	230	0.1
Coloured	2,047	0.86
Asian	230	0.1

Historical population
Year	Pop.	±%
1985	220,548	—
1991	257,054	+16.6%
2001	255,826	−0.5%
2011	237,799	−7.0%
