= Swartkops =

- Location within Eastern Cape Location within South Africa
- Coordinates: 33.8752°S 25.6048°E
- Country: South Africa
- Province: Eastern Cape
- Municipality: Nelson Mandela Bay
- Main Place: Port Elizabeth

Area
  - Total: 0.59 km^{2} (0.23 sq mi)

Population (2011)
  - Total: 883
  - Density: 1,500/km^{2} (3,900/sq mi)

Racial makeup (2011)
  - Black African: 21.7%
  - Coloured: 6.5%
  - Indian/Asian: 0.9%
  - White: 70.9%

First languages (2011)
  - Afrikaans: 60.7%
  - English: 26.2%
  - Xhosa: 10.3%
  - Sotho: 1.7%
  - Other: 1.1%
- Time zone: UTC+2 (SAST)
- Postal code (street): 6210
- PO box: 6209
- Area code: 041

Swartkops is a village in the Eastern Cape province of South Africa.

The location is on the Swartkops River, 11 km north of Port Elizabeth and 1,6 km from the Indian Ocean. Swartkops means "black hills" in Afrikaans, and the name is said to refer to surrounding hillocks crested with dark shadows.

A railway junction was built here by the Cape Government Railways in 1872, to service the lines being constructed to Makhanda and Alicedale in the east, Port Elizabeth to the south, and Uitenhage to the west.

== Transport ==
=== Roads ===
The main route through Swartkops is Grahamstown Road (R102 regional route) which leads southwards to Deal Party and Port Elizabeth and northwards to Motherwell and Markman.

The M17 route, named Dibanisa Road, passes Swartkops to the west running northwards to Markman and southwards to iBhayi. The M19 route, named Trunk Road, passes Swartkops to the south running westwards to Redhouse, Perseverance, Despatch and Uitenhage.
