= M10 (Gqeberha) =

Road in Nelson Mandela Bay, South Africa

Metropolitan route M10

Route information
- Maintained by the Nelson Mandela Bay Metropolitan Municipality
- Length: 33 km (21 mi)

Major junctions
- Southeast end: M5 / R102 Govan Mbeki Avenue in Gqeberha
- M8 in Gqeberha; N2 in Gqeberha; M14 in Gqeberha; M19 in Uitenhage; M22 in Uitenhage
- Northwest end: R334 Cuyler Road in Uitenhage

Location
- Country: South Africa

Highway system
- Numbered routes of South Africa
← M9	→ M11

The M10 (sometimes referred to as the R368) is a metropolitan route in the Nelson Mandela Bay Municipality in South Africa that connects Gqeberha and Uitenhage.

It is an alternative route to the R75 Route for travel between Gqeberha and Uitenhage.

== Route ==
The M10 begins at a junction with the R102 (Govan Mbeki Avenue) and the M5 (Mount Road) in North End (just north of the Gqeberha City Centre), heading north-west. It runs along Harrower Road, then Stanford Road (meeting the M8 Kempston Road), to cross the N2 Highway and pass through the southern part of Bethelsdorp.

At the Booysens Park suburb, the M10 turns northwards onto Nooitgedacht Road and reaches a t-junction with Old Uitenhage Road, where it meets the western terminus of the M14. The M10 becomes the Old Uitenhage Road north-westwards and meets the western terminus of the M19 west of Despatch, adjacent to the Nelson Mandela Bay Logistics Park. Here, it becomes Algoa Road and enters Uitenhage Industries, crossing the Swartkops River. It then bends to the west, meeting the M22 and becoming Durban Street, to end at a junction with the R334 (Cuyler Street) in the Uitenhage town centre.
