= Motherwell, South Africa =

Township in the Eastern Cape, South Africa

Motherwell
- Location within Eastern Cape Location within South Africa
- Coordinates: 33.804°S 25.580°E
- Country: South Africa
- Province: Eastern Cape
- Municipality: Nelson Mandela Bay

Area
  - Total: 25.86 km^{2} (9.98 sq mi)

Population (2011)
  - Total: 140,351
  - Density: 5,427/km^{2} (14,060/sq mi)

Racial makeup (2011)
  - Black African: 99.2%
  - Coloured: 0.3%
  - Indian/Asian: 0.1%
  - White: 0.1%
  - Other: 0.4%

First languages (2011)
  - Xhosa: 93.1%
  - English: 2.9%
  - Other: 4.0%
- Time zone: UTC+2 (SAST)
- Postal code (street): 6211
- PO box: 6213

Motherwell is a fast-growing township in the Eastern Cape province of South Africa. It forms part of the Nelson Mandela Bay Metropolitan Municipality which is the metropolitan area comprising Gqeberha, Despatch, Uitenhage and other surrounding towns.

== History ==
Motherwell was planned to accommodate the black squatters who were relocated from Zwide (and Veeplaas), and construction began in 1984. It is the largest settlement in terms of population and land area in Port Elizabeth.

== Geography ==
Motherwell is a township with about 140,000 inhabitants (as of 2011) about 25 km north of the Gqeberha city centre and is situated on the northern outskirts of the city's metropolitan area.

It is separated into blocks called "NU"s [Native Units] (e.g. NU5 or NU8).

Neighbouring areas include Swartkops River nature reserve in the south-west and Markman Industrial Park in the east. Further but nearby communities include Amsterdamhoek/Bluewater Bay, Swartkops, Wells Estate/Saint George's Strand and Coega.

== Facilities ==
Motherwell has a number of public schools, both at the primary and secondary level. It also has a clinic, a day hospital, a library, numerous public parks, and community centers.
