= M6 (Gqeberha) =

Road in Nelson Mandela Bay, South Africa

Metropolitan route M6

Route information
- Maintained by the Nelson Mandela Bay Metropolitan Municipality
- Length: 11.3 km (7.0 mi)

Major junctions
- East end: M19 / R75 in Despatch
- R75 near Uitenhage
- West end: R334 / M20 in Uitenhage

Location
- Country: South Africa

Highway system
- Numbered routes of South Africa
← M5	→ M7

The M6 is a metropolitan route in the Nelson Mandela Bay Municipality in South Africa that connects the eastern part of Despatch with the Uitenhage (Kariega) town centre.

== Route ==
The M6 begins at a junction with the M19 route east of the Despatch town centre (west of the Azalea Park suburb), just 190 metres north of the M19's interchange with the R75 route. The M6 begins by going northwards as Uitenhage Road, crossing the Swartkops River and turning westwards, to reach another interchange with the R75 route, where it leaves Despatch and enters Uitenhage. It continues westwards from the R75 junction as Union Avenue, then Caledon Street, to reach a junction with the R334 route in the Uitenhage town centre, marking its end.
