= M19 (Gqeberha) =

Metropolitan route in South Africa

Metropolitan route M19

Route information
- Maintained by the Nelson Mandela Bay Metropolitan Municipality
- Length: 20 km (12 mi)

Major junctions
- East end: R102 Grahamstown Road in Swartkops
- M17 in Swartkops; M14 in Perseverance; R75 / M6 in Despatch; R75 in Despatch
- West end: M10 in Uitenhage

Location
- Country: South Africa

Highway system
- Numbered routes of South Africa
← M18	→ M20

The M19 (sometimes referred to as the R367) is a metropolitan route in the Nelson Mandela Bay Municipality in South Africa that connects Swartkops with Uitenhage via Despatch.

== Route ==
The route begins at a junction with the R102 (Grahamstown Road) in Swartkops and runs in a north-westerly direction as Trunk Road and bypasses Swartkops to the south. It intersects with the M17 route (Dibanisa Road) and continues in a west-north-westerly direction. It then runs on the outskirts of the metropole, through Redhouse and Perseverance (where it meets the M14 route) and after a few kilometres, it intersects with the R75 freeway (to Gqeberha and Uitenhage) at an interchange south-east of Despatch Central, just south-west of the Azalea Park suburb.

At that interchange, they switch roads, with the R75 becoming the road westwards (a dual carriageway) and the M19 becoming the road northwards. At the immediate next junction, as the road northwards becomes the M6 route, the M19 becomes the road westwards (Main Street; Botha Street) through Despatch Central. West of Despatch Central, it intersects with the R75 freeway again at an off-ramp and immediately after meeting the R75, it ends at an intersection with the M10 (Algoa Road) south-east of the Uitenhage city centre, adjacent to the Nelson Mandela Bay Logistics Park.
