= R75 (South Africa) =

Regional route in South Africa

Provincial route R75

Route information
- Maintained by ECDRPW
- Length: 228 km (142 mi)

Major junctions
- North end: R63 near Graaff-Reinet
- N2 in Gqeberha
- South end: R102 in Gqeberha

Location
- Country: South Africa
- Major cities: Jansenville; Kariega; Despatch; Gqeberha

Highway system
- Numbered routes of South Africa
| ← R74 | → R76 |

The R75 is a provincial route in Eastern Cape, South Africa that connects Graaff-Reinet with Gqeberha via Despatch, Kariega and Jansenville.

== Route ==
Detailed Route

=== Nelson Mandela Bay ===
The R75 begins at the intersection with the R102 (Govan Mbeki Road) in Sydenham, just north of the Gqeberha city centre as a dual-carriage roadway and heads in a north-westerly direction as Commercial Road. It intersects with the N2 highway in the suburb of Korsten and after crossing the N2, it becomes Uitenhage Road.

It passes through the large township of Ibhayi before leaving the built up area of Gqeberha (previously known as Port Elizabeth) and intersecting with the M19 metropolitan route at an interchange south-east of Despatch, adjacent to the Azalea Park suburb. Here, the R75 and the M19 switch roads, with the M19 becoming the northwards road (Uitenhage Road) and the R75 becoming the road westwards, immediately becoming a dual-carriageway freeway.

It bypasses Despatch Central to the south and then turns northwards to intersect with the M19 again just west of Despatch Central (east of Kariega Industrial). It crosses the Swartkops River and bypasses Kariega Central (previously known as Uitenhage) to the east (where it meets the M6 metropolitan route at an interchange) before meeting the R334 and ending as a dual-carriageway freeway north of Kariega and becoming a single-carriageway. 22 km after its ending as a dual-carriageway, it leaves the Nelson Mandela Bay Metropolitan Municipality.

=== Sarah Baartman District ===
After leaving the Nelson Mandela Bay Metropolitan Municipality, it enters the Sarah Baartman District Municipality (previously Cacadu District Municipality), heading in a north-north-west direction and then heading north-west. It intersects with the R336 (to Kirkwood) and passes through Kleinpoort. Shortly after Kleinpoort it intersects with the R329 (to Willowmore) and heads in a northerly direction. It then intersects with the R400 (to Riebeek East and Grahamstown) and heads north-west again passing through Jansenville (where it crosses the Sundays River). In Jansenville it meets with the R339 (to Klipplaat) and heads north-east and then meets with the R337 (to Cradock) and heads north-north-west again as the Soutpansnek Pass towards Graaff-Reinet. It then ends at an intersection with the R63 approximately 23 kilometres south of Graaff-Reinet.

== Mohair Route ==
The Mohair Route, a major tour route in the Eastern Cape follows the R75 from Graaff-Reinet (considered the centre for mohair farming) to Kariega via Jansenville.
