= Sonskyn Hoekie =

Squatter camp in Pretoria, South Africa

Sonskyn Hoekie is a squatter camp on the edge of Pretoria, in South Africa. Confounding the usual stereotype of black informal settlements, the residents of Sonskyn Hoekie are mostly white. However, the ANC has criticised news coverage of Sonskyn Hoekie and underlined that most informal settlements are black.

== Conditions ==
There is no mains electricity or water; sanitation is very basic.
