= R75 =

R75 may refer to:

- R75 (South Africa), a road
- R-75 (Stargate), a fictional alien race in Stargate
- BMW R75, a motorcycle
- Colt R75, a machine gun
- HMS Virago (R75), a destroyer of the Royal Navy
