= Mapleton train collision =

1927 railway incident in South Africa

Details
- Date: 27 July 1927
- Location: Roodekop, Germiston
- Country: South Africa
- Incident type: Head-on collision

Statistics
- Trains: 2
- Deaths: 35
- Injured: 54

On 27 July 1927, a catastrophic head-on train collision occurred on the single-track railway line between Durban and Johannesburg, South Africa, near Roodekop in Germiston between Mapleton and Glenroy. The accident involved a southbound goods train and a northbound passenger train. 35 nine people were killed and 54 others were injured.

== Collision ==
The collision was a head-on train collision on the single-track railway line between Durban and Johannesburg, South Africa, near Roodekop in Germiston between Mapleton and Glenroy. The accident involved a southbound goods train and a northbound passenger train. 35 nine people were killed and 54 others were injured. The disaster site was at an altitude of 6000ft. At the time of the disaster it was dark and it was freezing.

The collision was primarily attributed to a critical error made by the driver of the southbound goods train departing from Roodekop. The driver, carrying the staff which authorised him to travel only as far as a newly added side track, apparently forgot to wait there for the northbound train from Durban. This oversight led to both trains being on the same track simultaneously, resulting in the collision.

== Casualties ==
The collision had tragic consequences. A total of 35 people lost their lives, two people from Europe and 33 from South Africa people. Some people died from the collision while many died succumbing to exposure to the harsh winter weather while waiting for rescue teams to arrive. Additionally, 54 individuals sustained injuries of varying severity. Most of the people on board were en route to the gold mines. There were also convicts on board. They didn't run away but started the rescue work.

== Trains involved ==
One of the locomotives involved in the collision was the SAR A Class 4-8-2T No. 196, manufactured by Dubs & Co. (Dubs No. 3819).

The coach of type J-12 "3119" built at the workshop of the SAR in Uitenhage that was involved in the collision was one of six native coaches numbered 3114 to 3119. She was scrapped after the collision.
