= Francis Flack =

Anglican priest

Francis Walter Flack (b Cambridge 22 May 1859; d Uitenhage 25 June 1933) was an Anglican priest in the last two decades of the nineteenth century and the first three of the twentieth, most notably Archdeacon of Port Elizabeth from 1919 until his death.

Edwardes was educated at St Catharine's College, Cambridge. He was ordained deacon in 1883, and priest in 1884. After a curacy in Shildon he went out to South Africa.He served at Port Alfred, Port Elizabeth and Uitenhage.
