= M11 (Gqeberha) =

Metropolitan route in Nelson Mandela Bay, South Africa

Metropolitan route M11

Location
- Country: South Africa

Highway system
- Numbered routes of South Africa
← M10	→ M12

The M11 is a metropolitan route in Gqeberha, South Africa. It begins at the intersection with the M4 in Humewood and ends at the intersection with the M9 in Walmer.

== Route ==
The M11 begins at the intersection with the M4 Beach Road (to Schoenmakerskop and Deal Party) in Humewood and heads in a southwesterly direction as La Roche Drive. It curves in a northwesterly direction and intersects with Forest Hill Road heading a southwesterly direction again towards Chief Dawid Stuurman International Airport as Allister Miller Drive. The M11 enters Walmer and the airport providing access to its departures, arrivals and car rental facilities. After the airport it turns away from the airport and heading in a northwesterly direction again and becomes 3rd Avenue. It then shortly ends at an intersection with the M9 Heugh Road (to South End and Seaview).

== Suburbs ==
The M11 goes through the following suburbs (including the airport):

- Forest Hill
- Humewood
- Walmer (including the Chief Dawid Stuurman International Airport)
