= Coega Wind Farm =

Wind farm in South Africa

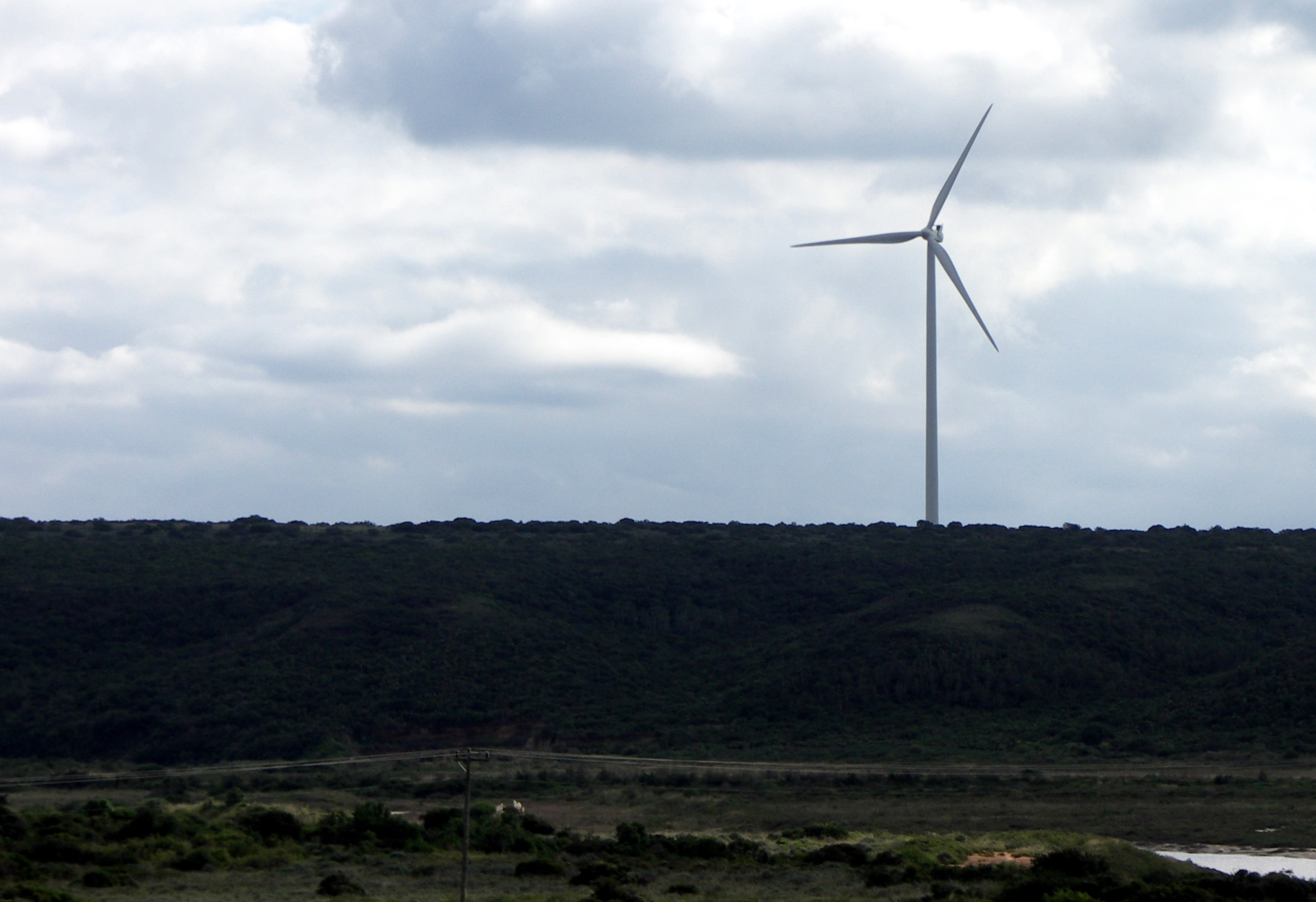
- Wind turbine developed by Electrawinds of Belgium
- Country: South Africa
- Location: Coega
- Coordinates: 33.7544812°S 25.6765536°E
- Status: Operational
- Commission date: 2010
- Owner: Electrawind

Wind farm
- Type: Onshore

Power generation
- Make and model: General Electric: GE2.5XL 1.8 MW

External links
- Commons: Related media on Commons

The Coega Wind Farm is a wind farm in Coega, an Industrial Development Zone (IDZ) covering 110 km^{2} (42 sq mi) of land, that is situated within the Nelson Mandela Metropolitan Municipality near Port Elizabeth, in the Eastern Cape province of South Africa. Installed by the Belgian company Electrawinds, it was the first commercial wind farm built in the country.
