= Tony Gum =

South African photographer (born 1995)

- Born: 1995 (age 29–30); Kwa Langa, Cape Town
- Citizenship: South Africa
- Occupation: Photographer

Tony Gum (born 1995) is a South African photographer. Gum was born in Kwa Langa township in Cape Town, Western Cape Province. She began her photographic career by posting selfies on Instagram; this amateur effort quickly developed into a professional art career. She was awarded the Miami Beach Pulse Prize in 2017.
