= Masifunde Sonke =

Masifunde Sonke is an educational project of South Africa Partners, a Boston-based non-profit dedicated to fostering the development of mutually beneficial partnerships between organizations and institutions in the United States and South Africa in the areas of health, education, and economic development.

The project Masifunde Sonke: Let Us Read Together is a collection of 30 South African children's books that exhibit literary excellence and incorporate themes of justice, hope, and renewal. For each book bought in the US, a second copy of the same book is sent to an under-resourced rural or township school in South Africa. In this way, Masifunde Sonke promotes children's literature to encourage children to read in both countries.

In South Africa, the initiative addresses the need for access to books and library materials in rural and township schools, stimulates economic development, and also increases opportunities for cross-cultural learning between children in the United States and South Africa. In the USA, the initiative gives educators and parents the opportunity to share multicultural literature with their children.

The books cover a range of issues, from the first post-apartheid democratic elections of 1994 in "The Day Gogo Went to Vote" to "Khushu Khushu", a multilingual collection of South African nursery rhymes.
