= Groendal Dam =

- Interactive map of Groendal Dam
- Official name: Groendal Dam
- Location: Eastern Cape, South Africa
- Coordinates: 33°42′1″S 25°16′23″E
- Opening date: 1934
- Operators: Department of Water Affairs and Forestry

Dam and spillways
- Type of dam: arch
- Impounds: Zwartkops River
- Height: 51 m
- Length: 125 m

Reservoir
- Creates: Groendal Dam Reservoir
- Total capacity: 12 100 000 m³
- Surface area: 92 ha

Groendal Dam is an arch-type dam located on the Zwartskop River, near Uitenhage, Eastern Cape, South Africa. The Dam was originally called the Dolley Reservoir, in recognition of the contribution of the Dolley family to the development of Uitenhage. The Dam was constructed in 1933 (commissioned in 1934) and its primary purpose is for municipal and domestic use. The hazard potential of the dam has been ranked high (3).

== See also ==
- List of reservoirs and dams in South Africa
- List of rivers of South Africa
