= Township (South Africa) =

Urban living areas reserved for non-whites in Apartheid South Africa

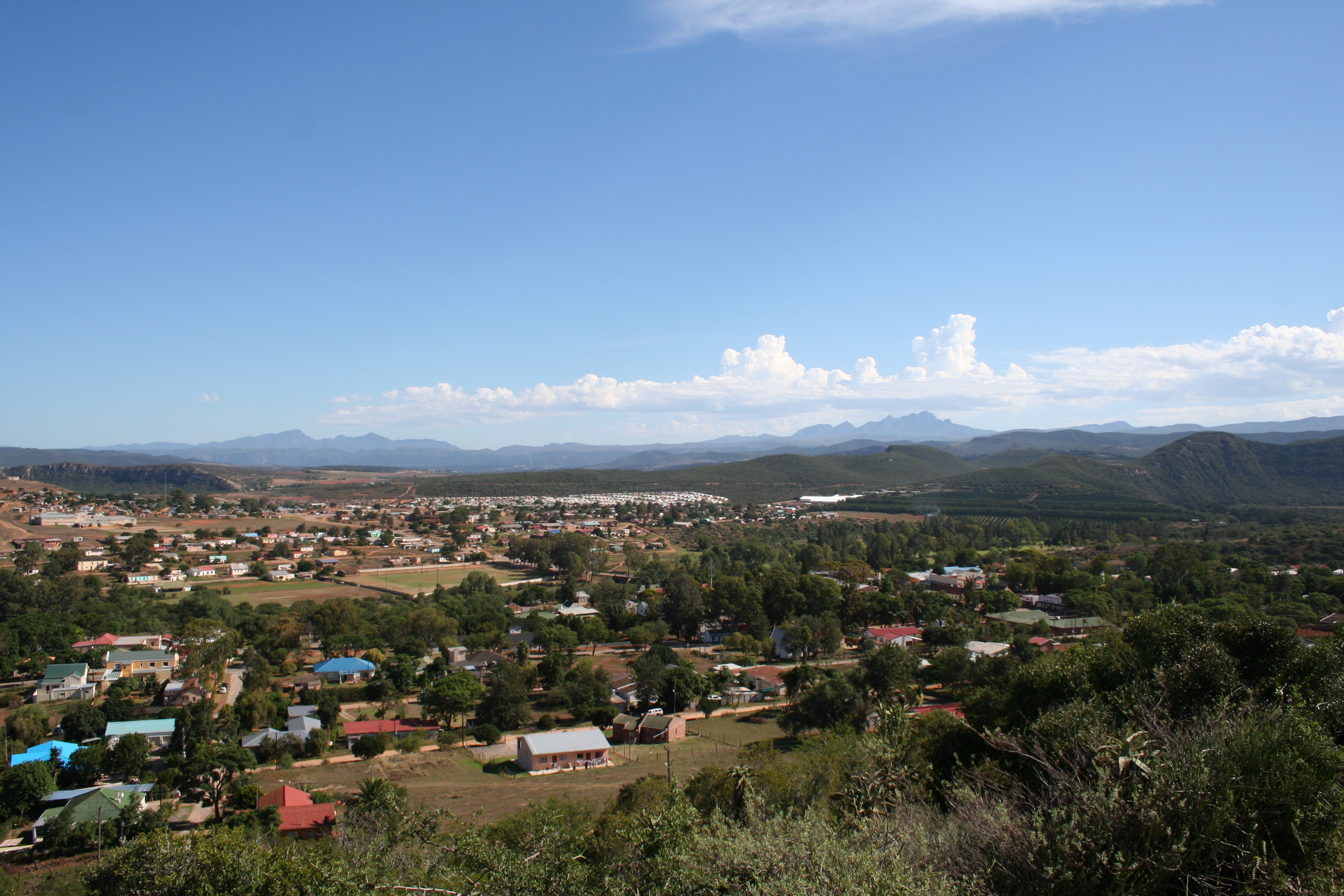
The town of Hankey (foreground), with accompanying township (background) on the edge of the town.

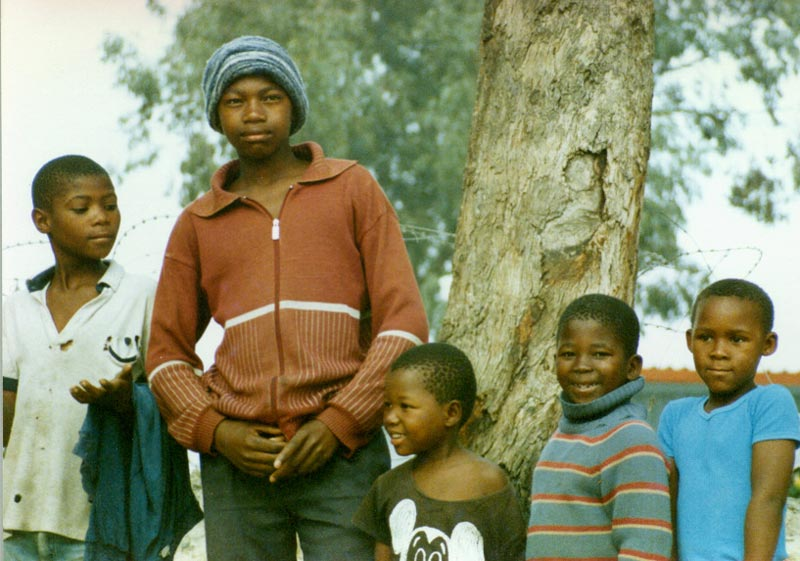
Children in a township near Cape Town in 1989

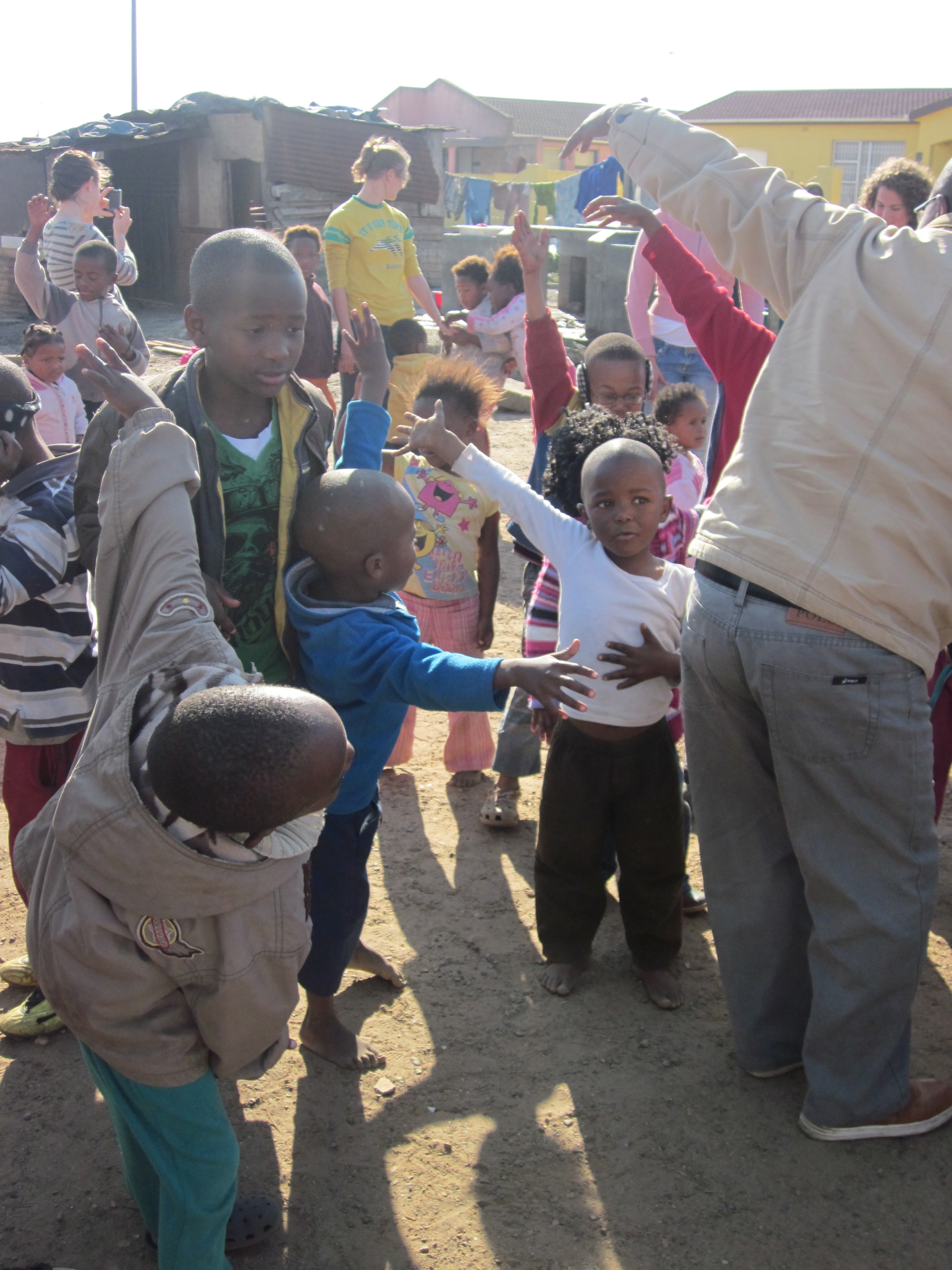
Children in a township near Cape Town

In South Africa, the terms township and location usually refer to an under-developed, racially segregated urban area, from the late 19th century until the end of apartheid, which were reserved for non-whites, namely Black South Africans, Cape Coloureds and Indian South Africans. Townships were usually built on the periphery of towns and cities. The term township also has a distinct legal meaning in South Africa's system of land title, which carries no racial connotations.

Townships for non-whites were also called locations or lokasies in Afrikaans and are often still referred to as such in the smaller towns. The slang term "kasie / kasi", a popular short version of "lokasie" is also used. Townships sometimes have large informal settlements nearby.

== History ==
=== Early development ===
During 1900–1950 (roughly), the majority of the black population in the major urban areas lived in hostels or servants' accommodations, these were provided by employers, and the workers were mostly single men. In the period during and following World War II, urban areas of South Africa experienced a rapid period of urbanisation as the colour bar was relaxed due to the war. Neither employers nor the government built new accommodations or homes for the influx of new residents. This led to overcrowding, and poor living conditions, contributing to high levels of crime and violence. High rents and overcrowding led to land invasions and the growth of shack settlements, which were largely ignored by the government.

By 1950, a large portion of the urban black population lived in townships. In 1950, upwards of 100,000 people were living in townships in the Witwatersrand area; 50,000 people lived in Cato Manor in Durban; and an estimated 150,000 black and coloured people lived in townships in Cape Town.

Living conditions in the shack township settlements were poor, but they had some advantage over the other more established options, like hostels, of being cheap and largely unregulated by the apartheid-era South African Police.

=== Apartheid: 1948–1994 ===
In 1950, the Group Areas Act was enacted, which empowered the Governor-General to designate land for the sole use of a specific race. Under this law, black people were evicted from properties that were in areas designated as "white only" and forced to move into segregated townships. Separate townships were established for each of the three designated non-white race groups: black people, Coloureds, and Indians – as per the Population Registration Act, 1950.

=== Post-apartheid ===
Most South African towns and cities have at least one township associated with them. Some old townships have seen rapid development since 1994, with, for instance, wealthy and middle-income areas sprouting in parts of Soweto and Chatsworth. Despite their origins in apartheid South Africa, today the terms township, location, and informal settlement are not used pejoratively. However, policymakers are, as in the 1950s, once again using the term 'slums' in a highly pejorative way.

== Infrastructure problems ==
Informal settlements that are normally self established around regulated townships are faced with several social problems. Most often, the residents of informal settlements do not own the land on which their houses are built. In effect, these houses are built illegally. Construction is informal and unregulated by the government. This results in a lack of access to basic services such as sewerage, electricity, roads, and clean water, which adversely affects the residents' quality of life.

Sewerage, water, and electrical infrastructure within townships are often in need of repair, resulting in a lack of sanitation due to problems with accessibility and availability. Electricity, water, and sewerage are managed by different government departments, resulting in inefficiencies in the absence of substantial coordination at all stages of the project planning, budgeting, and implementation cycle.

=== Sewerage ===
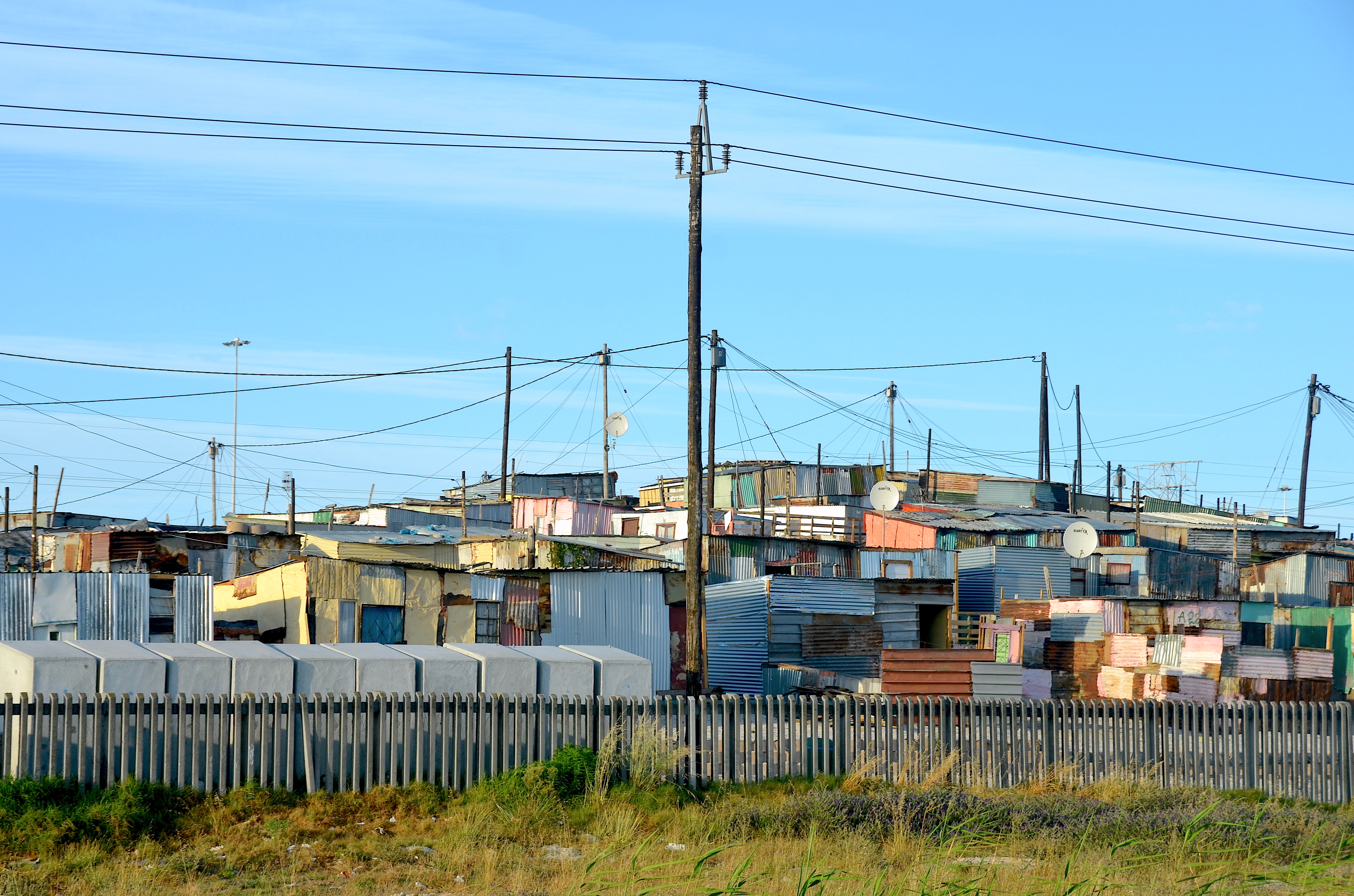
Khayelitsha, Township along N2 road near Cape Town (2015)

The sewer systems within townships are poorly planned and constructed. The population of townships typically grows faster than what the infrastructure was planned for, causing overloads that result in blockages, surges, and overflows. There often are only a limited number of public toilets that are overused, abused, and quickly become health hazards for the communities. Another issue is poor access to maintenance activities, which is caused by a lack of space between houses. Some of the areas on the township peripheries or near the riverbanks do not have access to sanitation facilities because they are not connected to the formal waterborne sewerage system.

=== Water ===
A consequence of inadequate pumping infrastructure and large populations is that the water pressure in the townships is very low. Each section of the townships normally has one pump per section. The water is used for everything from washing clothes to cooking, drinking, bathing, and cleaning the house. Having limited water accessible to each section makes it very hard to meet the daily water needs per household.

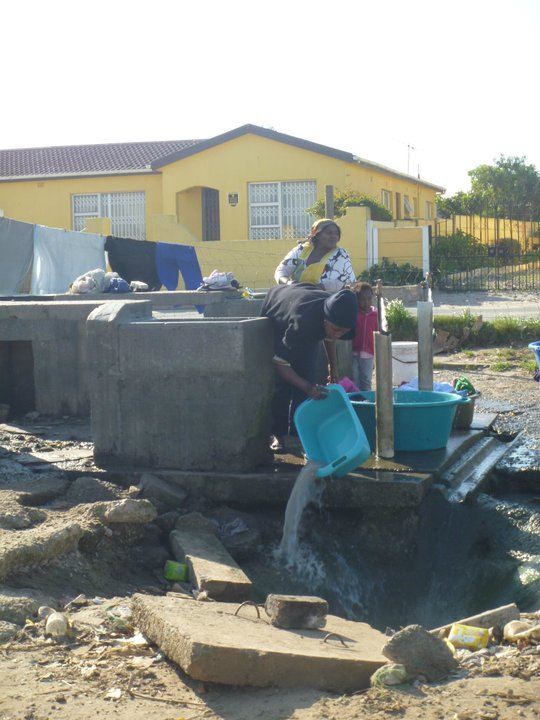
The only water pump in that area of the township.

=== Electricity ===
Illegal electricity connections are all-pervasive in the townships, with electrical wires strung along the trees leading to power boxes. Although dangerous, every house in the area has a wire coming out of it and every wire is known by their owner in order to fix problems as soon as they arise. Most of the sub-stations are very unsecured to begin with so having so many additional wires coming from them is very dangerous for the people nearby and the kids playing in the area. The electricity infrastructure has not undergone upgrades because of the government's disinclination to encourage power usage by non-residents.

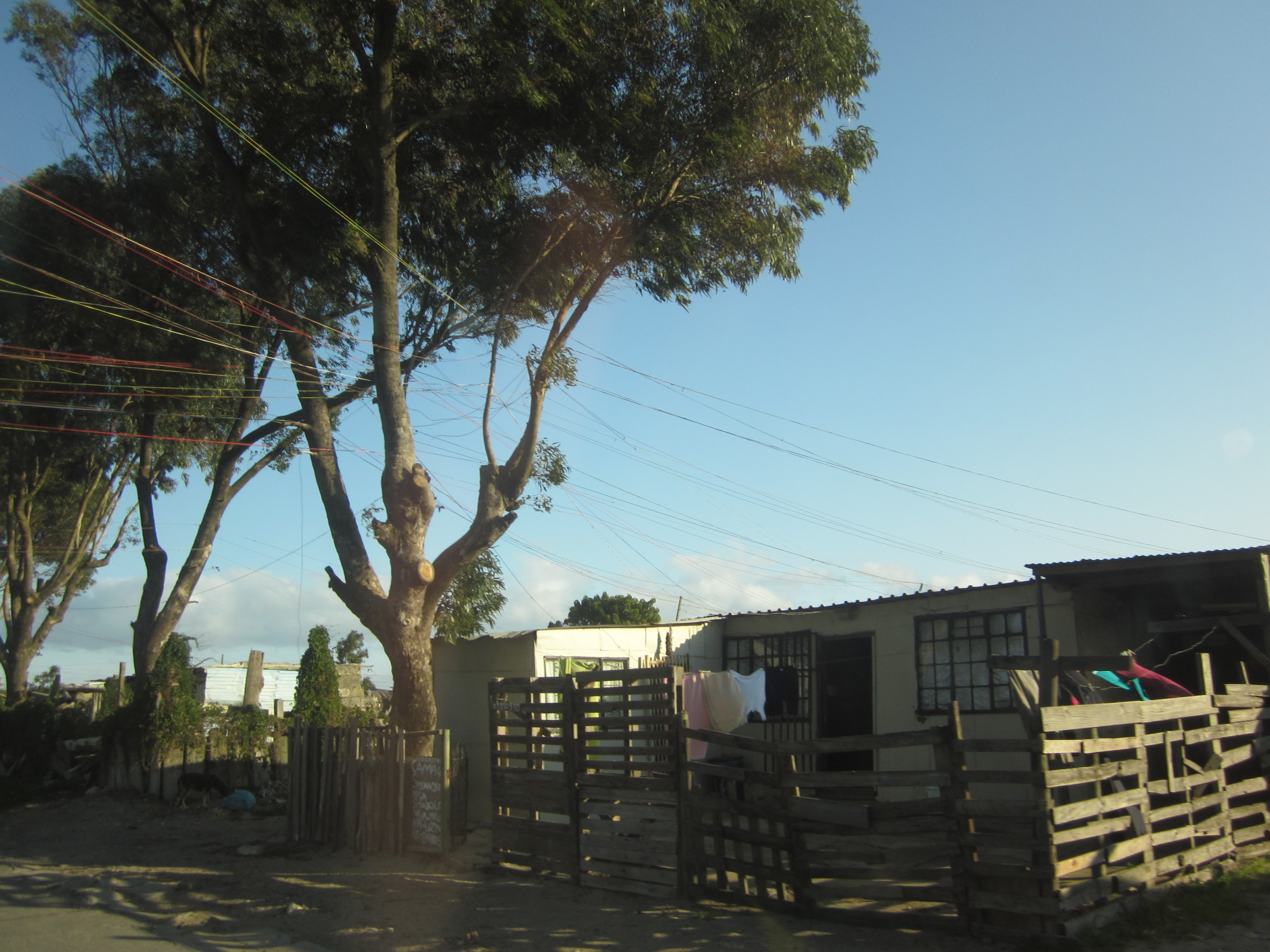
Electricity wires in a township near Cape

=== Flood risks ===
Some townships, such as Alexandra and Diepsloot, are built near rivers, and on flood plains. These areas are extremely dense with only tortuous, narrow access, few communal water points and banks of chemical toilets on the peripheries of the settlements. The settlements are beginning to be built in the old tributaries due to the continuing growth of the townships. Constructing houses in the dried up tributaries is a potential problem in the event of a large storm as the tributary starts to fill up with water again or in case of a backup of sewerage coming into the tributary. The houses built in that area stand the risk of being destroyed by natural occurrences. As the area grows, the tributaries are piped and a number of concrete aprons and gullies are constructed over the tributary into which the communal water points drain. The gullies are then choked with garbage and the tributaries appear to be substantially blocked but this will not hold off the water for very long if a flood comes through. Due to overcrowding, residents choose to build on river banks in hopes of easy access to water and laundry facilities, however, the available water is unsuitable for these purposes due to pollution, and they remain vulnerable to floods.

=== Backyard shacks ===
Backyard shacks are additional units on a plot of land which are rented out by the land owner for additional income. Plots of land designed for single-family houses have been turned into plots, that, on average hold six families instead of one. These structures are illegally built in violation of planning and building codes and strain the infrastructure. Governments are loath to act on backyard dwellings, as doing so would result in large-scale displacement of people. A 2001 study of the township called Diepsloot near Johannesburg showed that 24% of the residents lived in brick structures, 43% were in shack areas, and 27% were in backyard shacks.

== Social issues ==
=== Education ===
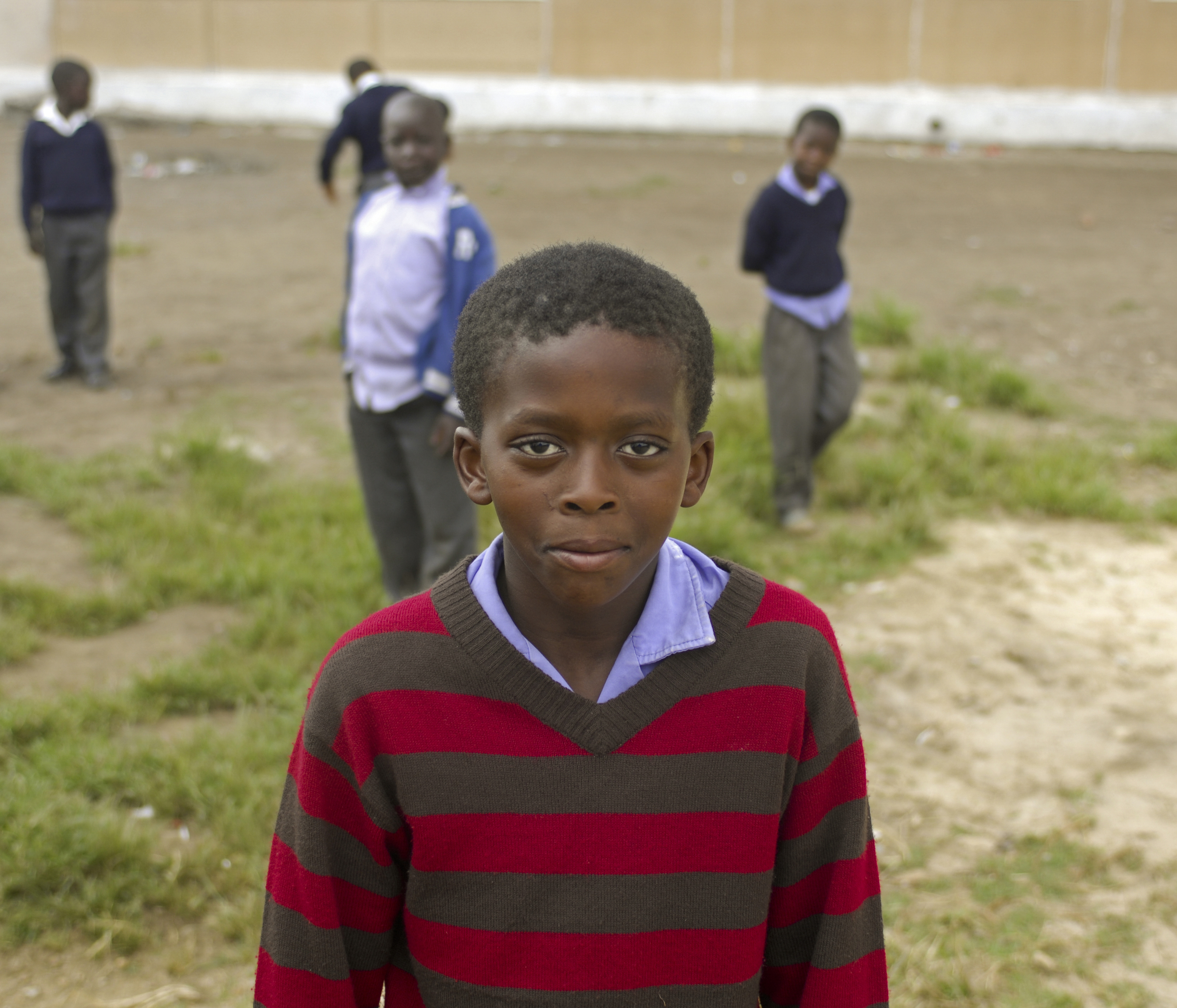
Schoolboy at the Lukhanyo Primary School, Zwelihle Township (Hermanus)

Township schools are often overcrowded and lack adequate infrastructure. There is a high dropout rate among poor youth, particularly around Grade 9. Despite government interventions, education outcomes remain skewed, with township students continuing to under-perform. This skewed distribution is mainly attributable to higher and more rapid drop-out rates among the poor, rather than to a lack of initial access to schooling. The formerly white schools uniformly produce better results as their governing bodies are able to raise substantial private funds. These funds are used to get resources that are usually inaccessible for the rural and township schools which survive on the commitment of their teachers.

There are schemes in operation aiming to give a "second chance" to young people who have dropped out of education, for example one operated by the Ukhanyo Foundation.

=== Gangs and violence ===
Gangs are a problem in townships and children as young as 12 or 13 get initiated into local gangs. Some see violence and gangs as a way of life and a part of their culture. The weapon of choice for most is a gun and with easy accessibility anyone is able to get one. It is estimated that out of the 14 million guns in circulation, in South Africa, only four million are registered and licensed to legal gun owners.

== Largest townships ==
Largest townships in South Africa at the time of the 2011 census:

Township	Population	Neighbouring city/town
Soweto	1,271,628	Johannesburg
Botshabelo	181,712	Bloemfontein
Thembisa	463,109	Kempton Park
Katlehong	407,294	Germiston
Umlazi	404,811	Durban
Soshanguve	403,162	Pretoria
Khayelitsha	391,749	Cape Town
Mamelodi	334,577	Pretoria
Mitchells Plain	310,485	Cape Town
Ibhayi	237,799	Port Elizabeth
Sebokeng	218,515	Vanderbijlpark
Mangaung	217,076	Bloemfontein
Philippi	200,603	Cape Town
Ivory Park	184,383	Midrand
Alexandra	179,624	Sandton
Phoenix	176,989	Durban
KwaMashu	175,663	Durban
Vosloorus	163,216	Boksburg
Mdantsane	154,576	East London
Delft	152,030	Cape Town
Etwatwa	151,866	Benoni
Motherwell	140,351	Port Elizabeth
Tsakane	135,994	Brakpan
Thabong	135,613	Welkom
Evaton	132,851	Vanderbijlpark
Daveyton	127,967	Benoni
Ntuzuma	125,394	Durban
Madadeni	119,497	Newcastle
Embalenhle	118,889	Secunda
Kagiso	115,802	Krugersdorp
Mabopane	110,972	Pretoria
Galeshewe	107,920	Kimberley
KwaNobuhle	107,407	Uitenhage
Saulsville	105,208	City of Tshwane
Jouberton	104,977	Klerksdorp
Thokoza	105,827	Alberton
KwaThema	99,517	Springs
Guguletu	98,468	Cape Town
Diepsloot	95,067	Midrand
Ga-Rankuwa	90,945	Pretoria
Seshego	83,863	Polokwane
Edendale	79,573	Pietermaritzburg
Osizweni	77,845	Newcastle
Orange Farm	76,767	Johannesburg
Hlubi	73,931	Newcastle
Duduza	73,295	Nigel, Gauteng
Mfuleni	52,274	Cape Town
Mpumalanga	62,406	Pinetown
Matsulu	47,306	Mbombela
Thembalethu	43,103	George
Mahwelereng	41,072	Mokopane
Sharpeville	37,599	Vereeniging

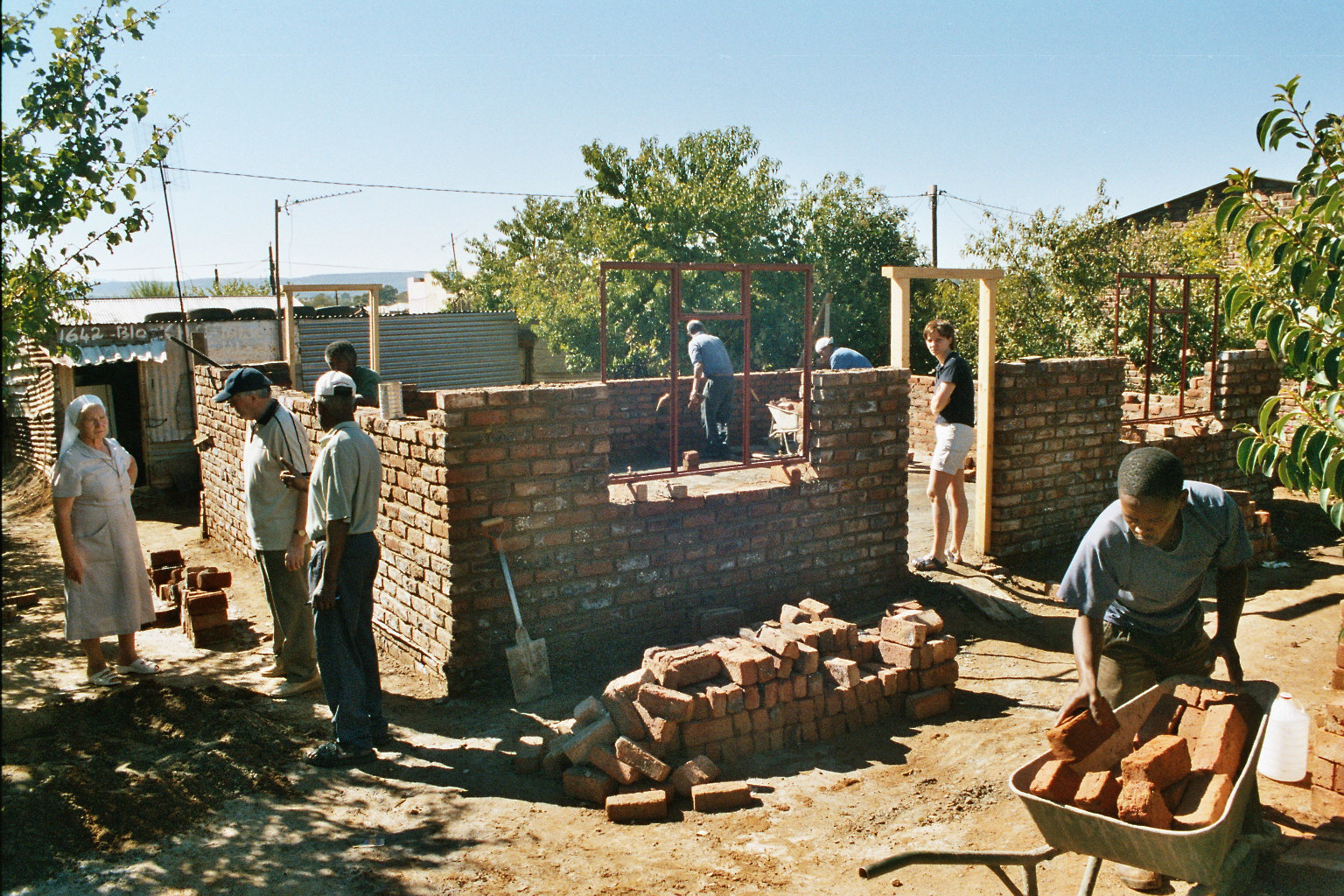
Construction of a house in the former township Dukathole (near Aliwal North)

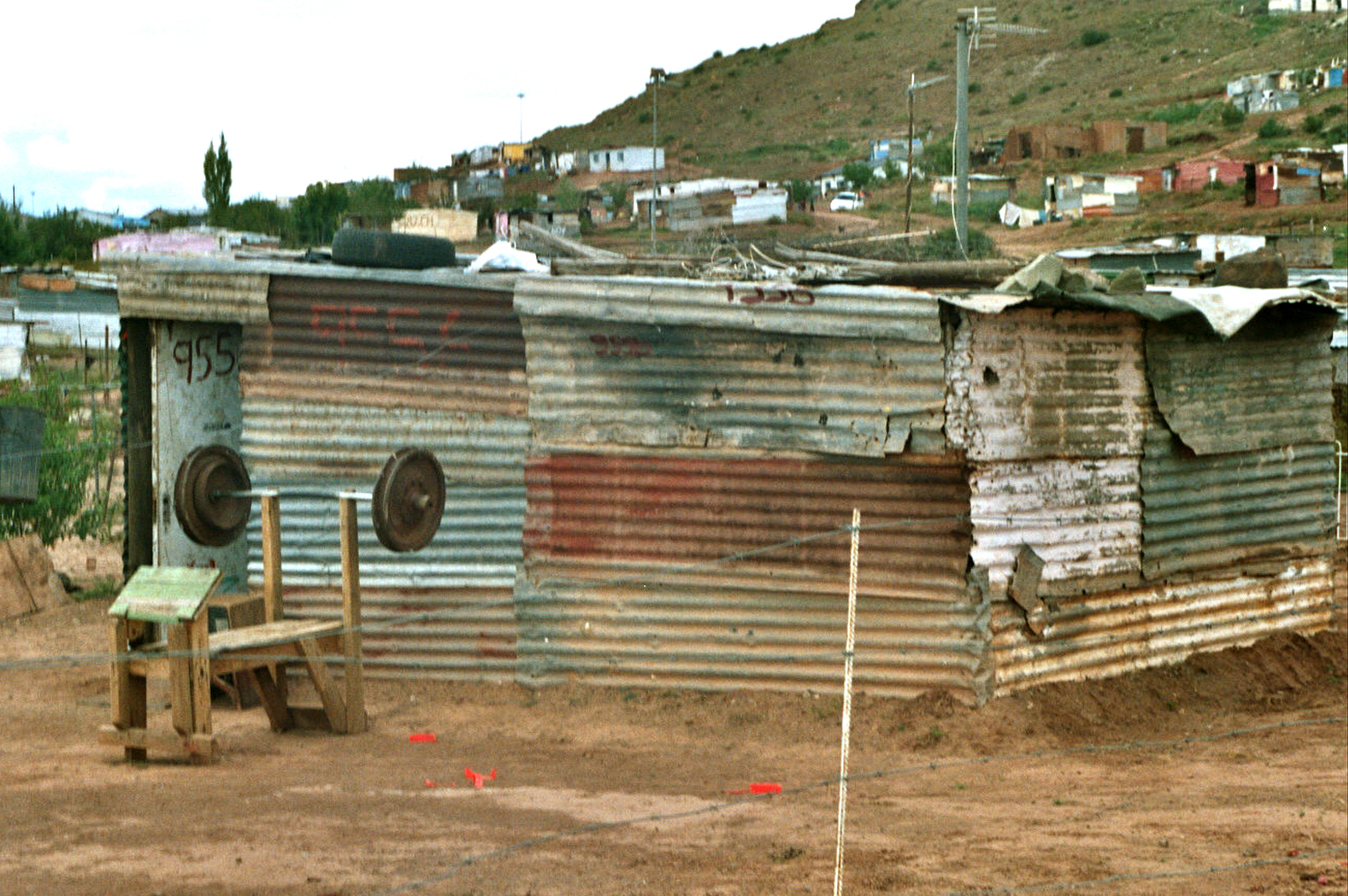
A bigger shack made of corrugated iron within Dukathole

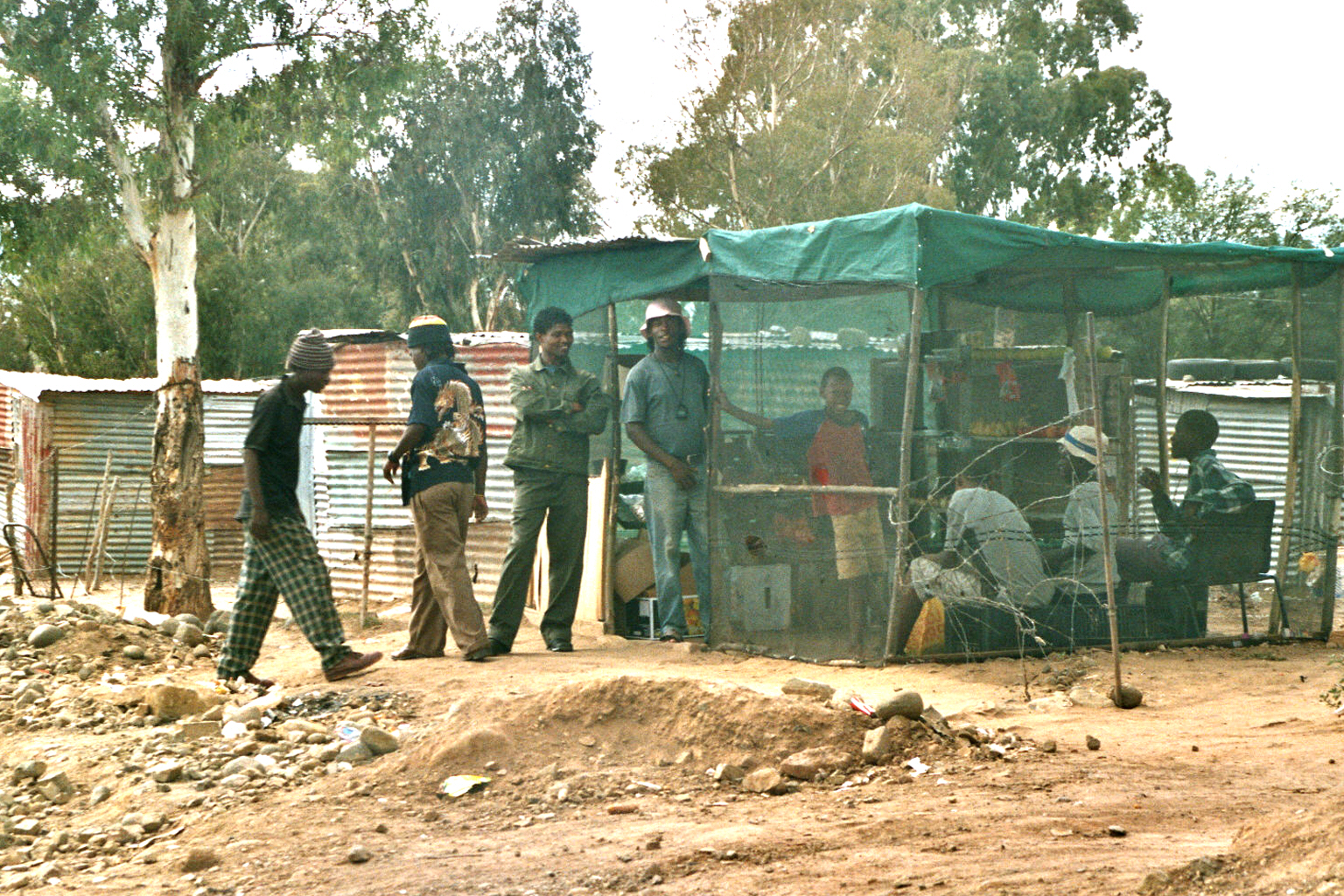
Little shop on the main street of Dukathole

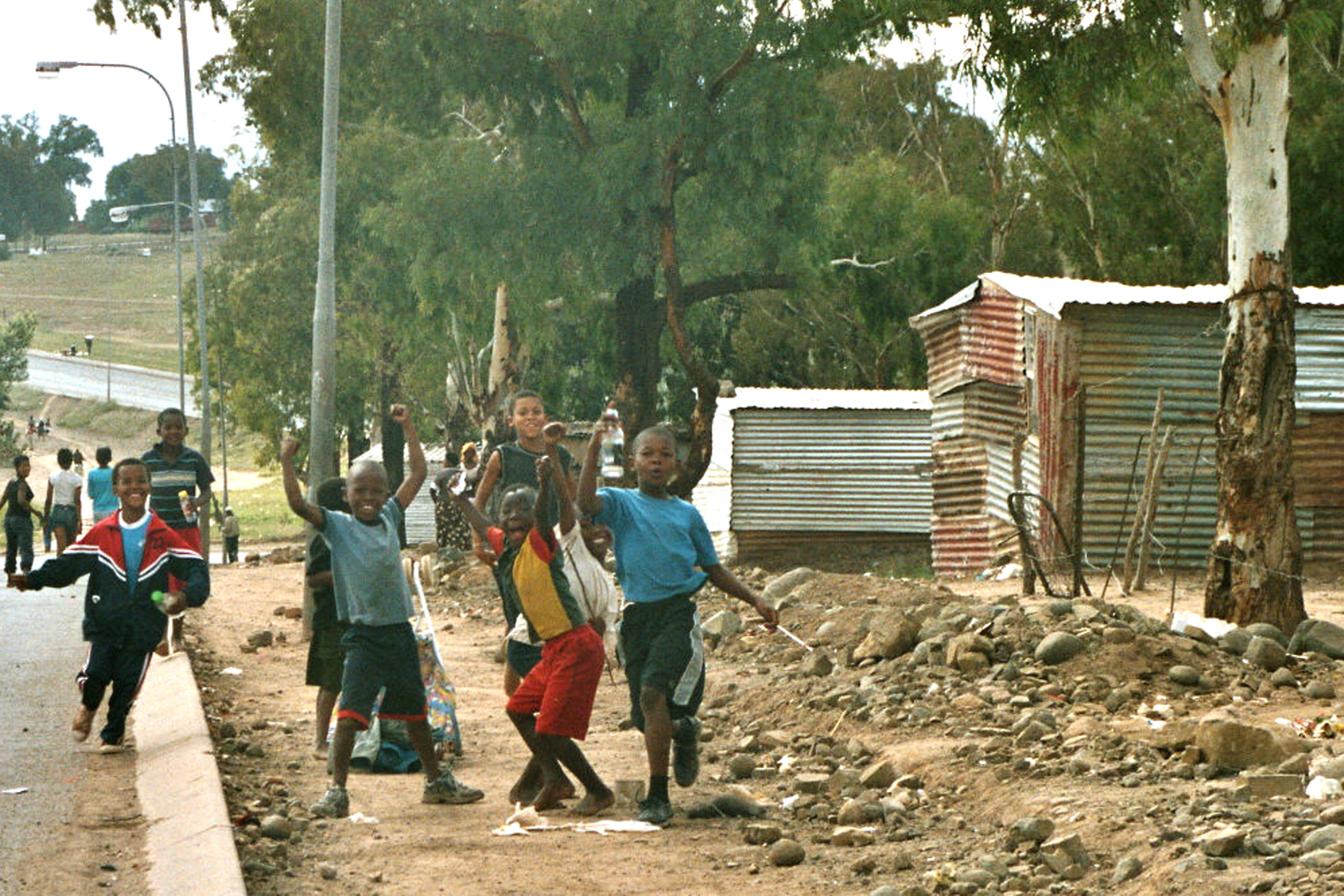
Dukathole - Street scene

== Legal meaning ==
The legal meaning of the term "township" in South Africa differs from the popular usage and has a precise legal meaning without any racial connotations. The term is used in land titles and townships are subdivided into erfs (stands). "Township" can also mean a designated area or district, as part of a place name. For instance "Industrial Township" has been used in reference to an industrial area, e.g. "Westmead Industrial Township", in Pinetown, South Africa.

Often a township (in the legal sense) is established and then the adjoining townships, with the same name as the original township, and with a numbered "Extension" suffix are later established. For example, the Johannesburg suburb of Bryanston has an extension called Bryanston Extension 3.

=== Relationship with "suburb" ===
In traditionally or historically white areas, the term "suburb" is used for legally defined residential townships in everyday conversation.

A suburb's boundaries are often regarded as being the same as the (legal) township boundaries, along with its numbered extensions, and it usually shares its name with the township (with some notable exceptions, such as the Johannesburg suburb known as Rivonia, which is actually the township of Edenburg with numbered extensions called Rivonia Extensions).

Occasionally, formerly independent towns, such as Sandton (which itself consists of numerous suburbs), are referred to as "suburbs".

== See also ==
- HIV/AIDS in South African townships
- Bantustan
- Ghetto
- Racial segregation
- Township tourism
- Old Location, a township of Windhoek, Namibia
- Katutura, a township of Windhoek, Namibia
- Tsotsitaal and Camtho, South African vernacular dialect mainly spoken in townships
