= Beachview, South Africa =

Beachview
- Location within Eastern Cape Location within South Africa
- Coordinates: 34.000°S 25.328°E
- Country: South Africa
- Province: Eastern Cape
- Municipality: Nelson Mandela Bay

Area
  - Total: 1.23 km^{2} (0.47 sq mi)

Population (2011)
  - Total: 475
  - Density: 386/km^{2} (1,000/sq mi)

Racial makeup (2011)
  - White: 92.0%
  - Black African: 3.0%
  - Coloured: 1.7%
  - Indian/Asian: 0.6%
  - Other: 2.7%

First languages (2011)
  - Afrikaans: 51.6%
  - English: 44.8%
  - Other: 3.6%
- Time zone: UTC+2 (SAST)
- Postal code (street): 6070
- PO box: 6011

Beachview is a village in Nelson Mandela Bay in the Eastern Cape province of South Africa.
