= Redhouse Yacht Club =

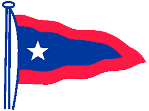
RYC Burgee

The Redhouse Yacht Club (RYC), which is amongst the oldest yacht clubs in South Africa, hosts large dinghy races, and operates a training program that has produced international champion sailors.

The club is located in the village of Redhouse, Eastern Cape, South Africa within a fifteen-minute drive of Port Elizabeth. It is situated on the Zwartkops River, a tributary to Algoa Bay which is a popular vacation destination, and a major South African sailing centre.

== Activities ==
The Club primarily caters to dinghy sailors, sponsors a major dinghy racing program, is an affiliate of the South African Sailing Academy and is a member of the International Sailing Federation as well as part of South African Sailing (organization). The climate around Algoa Bay allows for year-round sailing, and river sailing provides a more sheltered environment for smaller craft. There are about two races per week throughout the year with periodic larger events including national regattas. During its evolution the club has featured large fleets of diverse dinghies with the predominant race fleets presently consisting of Lasers, Mirrors, and Optimists.

The club hosts the annual Eastern Cape inter-schools sailing championship, the 23rd event was held in 1999

The Club provides marina services for local and visiting boaters, and is endorsed as one of the regional attractions by the Eastern Cape Tourism Board.

== History ==
The club began in 1904 when a group of yachtsmen met under the leadership of Mr. R.P. Jones, at the Zwartkops Rowing Club in the Village of Redhouse, South Africa. Three types of boats were featured in the first race under Club colors: five-ton, three-ton, and two-ton though, by contrast, today's popular raceboats such as Lasers and Optimist are limited by a minimum weight of 55 and 35 kilograms respectively.

A National Regatta was held at Redhouse in celebration of the club's 50th Anniversary of the Club in 1954 and the Centenary Regatta took place fifty years later in October 2004.

In the nineteen-seventies, the Mirror class became popular with more women and children becoming involved while junior sailing was boosted by the appearance of the Optimist single-handed dinghy, which has since served as the club's training boat. By 1975, the single-handed Laser had made its appearance at RYC and now dominates the fleet, in part since it is an Olympic class.

During the mid-1990s, Redhouse Yacht produced several successful Optimist sailors who recorded strong results in national and international competitions.

The club's facilities were damaged by a major flooding of the river in August 2006.

== Notable Redhouse Yacht Club Sailors ==
- Andrew Collier
- Phillipa Baer
- Justin Onvlee – South African Sailor who, sailed and incredible regatta, going on to be crowned, the 2004 Laser 4.7 World Champion: Protea Colours: Eastern Province Colours: Laser 4.7 World Championship 2004 – Riva del Garda Italy – 1st: Junior Yachtsman of the Year – 2004 David Butler Trophy: Junior Yachtsman of the Year – 2005 David Butler Trophy:
- Gregory Reuvers – South African Sailor, whose record for the best placed South African Optimist Sailor at a World Championships 22 years later has just been bettered by Ian Walker March, placing an incredible 5th at the 2019 Optimist World Championships. Junior Yachtsman of the Year 1997 – David Butler Trophy: South African Sailing Colours: Eastern Province Colours: European Championships 1996 – Palma Mallorca Spain – 56th: Optimist World Championships 1997 – Carrickfergus – 24th: Optimist World Championships 1998 – Portugal – 31st:
- Simon Baer- South African Sailor achieving a well deservered 27th at the Optimist World Championships: South African Sailing Colours: Eastern Province Colours: Optimist World Championships 1998 – Portugal – 27th: South African Optimist National Champion – 1998:
- Jamie Waters South African Sailing Colours Optimist World Championships
- Mike Giles
