= Soutpansnek =

Coordinates: 32°52′24.0″S 24°42′49.2″E

Soutpansnek (Afrikaans for Salt Pan's Neck) is a mountain pass on the regional road R75, in the Eastern Cape province of South Africa between Jansenville and Graaff-Reinet.
