= Charl Mattheus =

South African Ultra Marathon Athlete (born 1965)

Charl Mattheus (born March 9, 1965, in Somerset East, Eastern Cape, South Africa) is a South African Ultra Marathon Athlete.

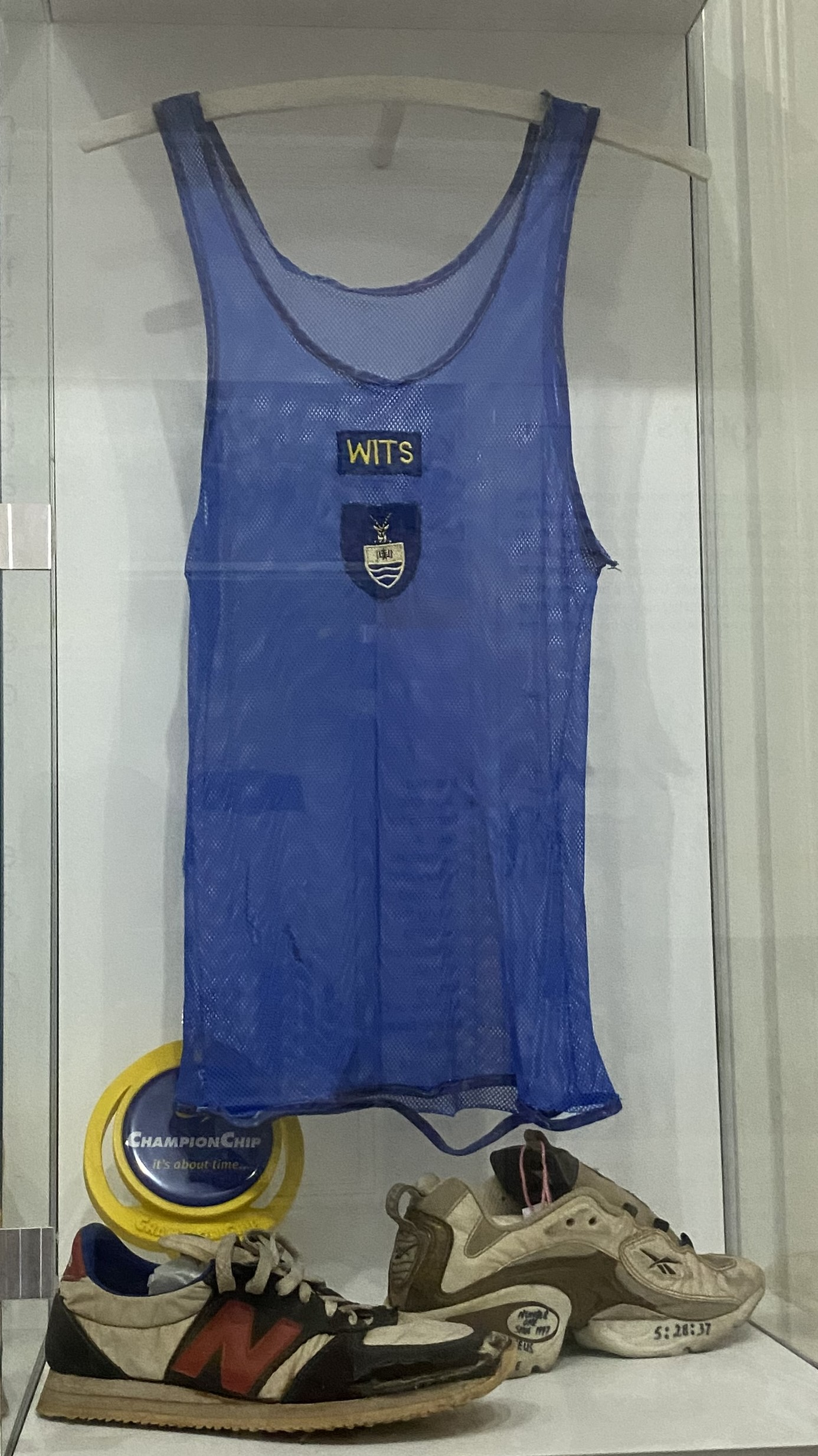
Mattheus's race shoes from the 1997 Comrades Marathon displayed in the Comrades House

== Life and education ==
Mattheus grew up in Despatch, Eastern Cape and completed his high school diploma at High School Despatch in 1982. He subsequently attended and completed a National Technical Diploma in Mechanical Engineering at Russell Road Technical College in Port Elizabeth in 1989. His education in the United States includes a BSc in Management (2007), an MBA (Masters in Business Administration) in Healthcare Management (2011) from Indiana Wesleyan University, and a DBA (Doctor of Business Administration) in Healthcare Management (2017) at Walden University. His first book, Understanding the United States Health Care System, was published in 2020.

Mattheus is known for his win in the Comrades Marathon in 1992, which he was disqualified from for taking medication containing phenylpropanolamine for his cold. Phenylpropanolamine was a prohibited substance at the time. However, research found that phenylpropanolamine provides no additional benefit to runners, and it was removed from the prohibited stimulants list shortly after the event. Mattheus finished the Comrades Marathon twelve times: 21st place in 1987, 7th place in 1988, 9th place in 1989, 32nd place in 1990, 6th place in 1991, 1st place in 1992 (though he was later disqualified), 11th place in 1994, 2nd place in 1995, 4th place in 1996, 1st place in 1997 (Comrades Marathon Champion), 2nd place in 1998, and 154th place in 2000. Mattheus is the only athlete to lose his Comrades Marathon Champion title and regain the title a few years later, improving on his finishing time in 1992 of 5:42:34 with a 5:28:37 time in 1997. Mattheus is now a dual citizen of the United States and South Africa. He lives in Waimanalo Beach, Hawaii, United States.
