= Skoenmakerskop =

- Location within Eastern Cape Location within South Africa
- Coordinates: 34.0307°S 25.579°E
- Country: South Africa
- Province: Eastern Cape
- Municipality: Nelson Mandela Bay
- Main Place: Port Elizabeth
- Time zone: UTC+2 (SAST)

Skoenmakerskop is a small village in the Eastern Cape, South Africa. It is located southwest of the promontory on which Port Elizabeth stands, 8 km west of Chelsea Point. Skoenmakerskop is Afrikaans for 'shoemaker's hill'. The village, the hill, and the Skoenmakersrivier nearby are all said to have been named after Volcker Schoemaker, a soldier who deserted and settled in the Eastern Province.
