= Metropolitan routes in Gqeberha =

Gqeberha, like most South African cities, uses metropolitan or "M" routes for important intra-city routes, a layer below national (N) roads and regional (R) roads. Each city's M roads are independently numbered.

Gqeberha metropolitan 1 route marker

Gqeberha metropolitan 20 route marker

== Table of M roads ==
No.	Direction	Description of route	Suburbs	Street names
M1	East/West	N2 (at level of Bluewater Bay) - R102 (at level of Amsterdamhoek)	Bluewater Bay, Amsterdamhoek	Weinronk Way, Hillcrest Dr., Riverside Dr., Tippers Creek, Amsterdamhoek Dr.
M3	East/West	N2 (at level of Deal Party) - R102 (same)	Deal Party	John Tallant Rd.
M4	North/South, then NW/SE then East/West	R102 (at Deal Party, south of M3) - N2 (interchange, freeway starts) - M5 (interchange) - M7 (interchange) - M9 (freeway ends) - M13 - M11 - M13 - ends in Schoenmakerskop at intersection with M18	Deal Party, North End, Central, South End, Humewood, Summerstrand, Schoenmakerskop	Baxter St., Burman Rd., Settlers Freeway, Humewood Rd., Beach Rd., Marine Dr.
M5	NE/SW	M4 (at level of North End) - R102 - M10 - M26 - R102 (Mill Park)	North End, Mount Croix, Mill Park	Mount Rd.
M6	East/West	R75 (Despatch; cosigned with M19) - M19 (Eastern Despatch) - R75 (Western Despatch) - R334 / M20 (Uitenhage)	Despatch, Uitenhage	Main St., Botha St., Union Ave., Caledon Ave.
M7	East/West	M4 (North End) - R102 - R102 (Mill Park) - M18 - M12 (cosigned for 1 block) - M15 (cosigned for 2 blocks) - N2 (interchange) - R102 (Linton Grange)	North End - Central - Mill Park - Walmer - Springfield - Lorraine - Sunridge Park - Framesby - Linton Grange	Albany Rd., Roseberry Ave., Target Kloof Rd., River Rd., Outspan Rd., 8th Ave., Main Rd., 17th Ave., Circular Dr., Kragga Kamma Rd., Samantha Way, Bramlin St.
M8	NE/SW	N2 (Sidwell) - R75 - M10 - M26 - R102 (Newton Park)	Sidwell, Korsten, Perridgevale, Newton Park	Kempston Rd., C. J. Langhenhoven Dr.
M9	East/West	M4 (South End) - M11 - M18 - M12 - leaves town to Seaview - M15 (area of Colleen Glen)	South End, Walmer, Greenshields Park, Charlo, Mount Pleasant, Seaview	Walmer Blvd., Heugh Rd., Buffelsfontein Rd.
M10	SE/NW (mostly)	R102 (North End) - M5 - M8 - N2 - changes to NE/SW as Nooitgedacht Road - M14 - resumes SE/NW - M19 - M22 - R334 / M20	North End, Sydenham, Sidwell, Gelvandale, Cleary Park, Salsoneville, Loonatville, Booysen Park - Khayamnandi - Despatch - Uitenhage	Harrower Rd., Standford Rd., Nooitgedacht Rd., Old Uitenhage Rd., Algoa Rd., Durban St.
M11	East/West	M4 (Humewood) - M13 - Port Elizabeth Airport - M9 (Walmer)	Humewood, Forest Hill, Walmer	La Roche Dr., Allister Miller Dr., 3rd Ave
M12	North/South	N2 (Cotswold) - M26 - R102 - M7 - M9	Cotswold, Newton Park, Mangold Park, Walmer Downs, Walmer, Springfield, Charlo	Disa Ave., William Moffett Expressway, 17th Ave.
M13	SE/NW	M4 (Humewood) - M11 - M4 (Summerstrand)	Humewood, Forest Hill, Summerstrand	Driftsands Dr., Strandfontein Rd., Admiralty Way
M14	East/West	R367/M19 (Perseverance) - R75 - R368/M16 - M10	Perseverance, Kwamagxaki, Govan Mbeki, Kleinskool, Kwanoxolo, Booysen's Park	Main Rd., Old Uitenhage Rd.
M15	East/West	N2 (Sunridge Park) - M7 - M7 - leaves town - M9 - N2 (out of town)	Sunridge Park, Lorraine, Kamma Park, Theescombe	Kragga Kamma Rd., Seaview Rd.
M17	North/South	R335 (Motherwell) - R367/M19 (Swartkops)	Motherwell, Swartkops	Dibanisa Rd.
M18	North/South	M7 (Walmer) - M9 - M4	Walmer, Port Elizabeth, Schoenmakerskop	10th Ave., Victoria Dr.
M19	ESE/WNW	R102 (Swartkops) - M17 - M14 - R75 - M6 (co-signed) - M6 - R75 - M10 (Despatch)	Swartkops, Perseverance, Despatch	Trunk Rd., Main St., Botha St.
M26	East/West	M5 (North End) - M8 - M12 (Newton Park)	North End, Kensington, Adcockvale, Newton Park	Diaz Rd., Burt Dr.

== See also ==
- Numbered routes in South Africa
