= Despatch, South Africa =

Despatch Despatchers/Klipgooiers
- Location within Eastern Cape Location within South Africa
- Coordinates: 33°48′5.57″S 25°28′36.41″E
- Country: South Africa
- Province: Eastern Cape
- Municipality: Nelson Mandela Bay

Area
  - Total: 19.65 km^{2} (7.59 sq mi)

Population (2011)
  - Total: 39,619
  - Density: 2,016/km^{2} (5,222/sq mi)

Racial makeup (2011)
  - Black African: 36.9%
  - Coloured: 17.8%
  - Indian/Asian: 0.2%
  - White: 44.7%
  - Other: 0.4%

First languages (2011)
  - Afrikaans: 59.7%
  - Xhosa: 33.2%
  - English: 5.1%
  - Other: 2.0%
- Time zone: UTC+2 (SAST)
- Postal code (street): 6220
- PO box: 6219
- Area code: 041

Despatch is a small town in the Eastern Cape Province of South Africa situated between Gqeberha and Uitenhage with an estimated population of 40,000. It forms part of the Nelson Mandela Bay Metropolitan Municipality which includes Gqeberha and Uitenhage, and has collectively a population of over 1.3 million.

== History ==
The town of Despatch is situated on rich clay soil and was the site of a thriving brick industry in the late 1800s. Despatch's name comes from this brick industry, as bricks were dispatched from the original railway siding. Many older buildings in Uitenhage and Port Elizabeth were constructed using these bricks, which can be identified by the word 'Despatch' imprinted on the top and bottom. The town's only remaining reminder of its brick industry past is a chimney built in 1882, which was part of the Brick Works. This chimney, located in a field on the northern outskirts of town next to the railway lines, has recently been restored to its former glory, now featuring supports that give it the appearance of a space rocket.

In 1903 the remains of an Algoasaurus were discovered near Despatch.

The township of Despatch was originally developed in 1942 to offer cheaper housing alternatives to its fast-growing neighbours of Uitenhage and Port Elizabeth. The town obtained official municipal status in 1945 and in 2001 it jointed with Uitenhage, Port Elizabeth and surrounding areas to form the Nelson Mandela Bay Metropolitan Municipality.

== Transport ==
=== Roads ===
Despatch lies just off the R75 highway (serves as a southern bypass) heading north–south from Graaff-Reinet to Gqeberha. However, the main route through the town is the M19 (Botha Street; Main Street) heading south-east from Despatch to Swartkops. The M6 (serves as a northern bypass) connects the R75 interchange in the east to Uitenhage in the west. The M10 bypasses Despatch to the west, heading north–south from Uitenhage Industries to Bethelsdorp.

== Education ==
=== Secondary Education ===
The town is the location of the Urban Academy Private School.

== Notable people ==
- Johan Botha - Cricketer
- Rassie Erasmus - Rugby Coach
- Adri Geldenhuys— Rugby Player
- Danie Gerber - Rugby Player
- Rynard Landman - Rugby Player
- Rudi Koertzen - Cricket Umpire
- Charl Mattheus - Comrades Marathon Runner
- Elric van Vuuren - Rugby Player
- Daniel du Plessis - Rugby Player
- Arnold Vosloo - Hollywood actor
- Andries Ferreira - Rugby Player
