= Coega =

Special economic zone in the Eastern Cape, South Africa

Coega Special Economic Zone
- Special economic zone
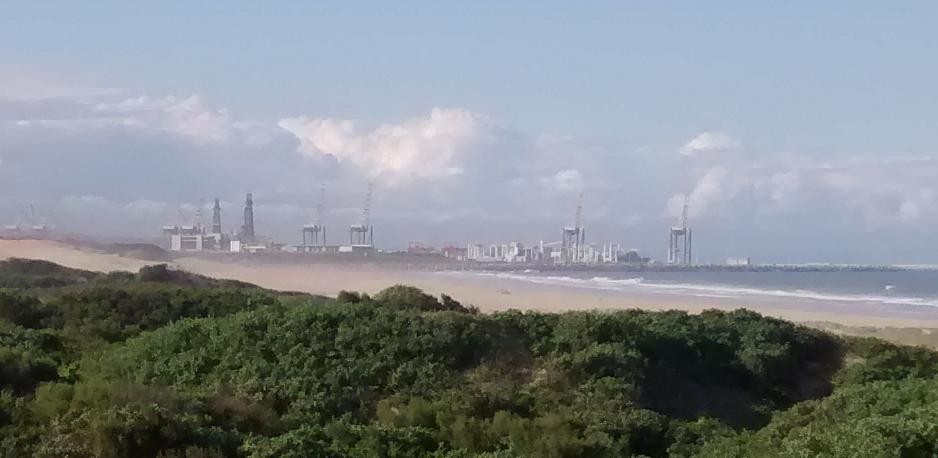
- View of the Coega SEZ from St George Beach
- Interactive map of Coega Special Economic Zone
- Location within Eastern Cape
- Coordinates: 33°47′45.7″S 25°40′4.4″E
- Country: South Africa
- Province: Eastern Cape
- Metropolitan municipality: Nelson Mandela Bay Metropolitan Municipality
- Established: 1999; 27 years ago

Area
  - Total: 90.03 km^{2} (34.76 sq mi)
- Time zone: UTC+2 (SAST)
- Website: coega.co.za

The Coega Special Economic Zone (Coega SEZ) is a special economic zone situated approximately 20km from Gqeberha, in the Eastern Cape province of South Africa.

Established in 1999, and 90.03 sqkm in extent, the initiative is a multibillion-dollar industrial development complex customised for heavy, medium and light industries, and adjacent to a deep-water port, the Port of Ngqura.

The zone is developed and operated by the Coega Development Corporation (CDC), while the Transnet National Ports Authority (TNPA) develops the deep-water port facility, the Port of Ngqura.

== Structure ==
The Coega SEZ is a phased development around industry clusters with Custom Control Areas dedicated for export-oriented manufacturing for companies located in the zone. Coega offers a platform for global exports by attracting foreign and local investment in manufacturing industries.

A strategic development framework plan for the Coega SEZ has been developed, focusing on infrastructure development and facilities for the core development area, which comprises 65 km^{2}.

The Coega SEZ is demarcated into 14 zones and is specifically designed along the cluster model linking related industries from the commercial cluster, logistics cluster to automotive cluster, and energy cluster.

The Coega SEZ was developed to attract investment from the automotive, agro-processing, chemicals, energy, general manufacturing, metals, and business process outsourcing.

== Port of Ngqura ==
The Port of Ngqura is a deep-water port adjacent to Coega SEZ, 20 km northeast of Gqeberha on the east coast (Indian Ocean) of South Africa. The deep-water port, with a depth of between 16m and 18m, cost R10 billion and became operational in 2009. The Port assists the Coega SEZ as a means of transporting equipment and manufactured products in and out of the country.

== Laydown area ==
Between Coega SEZ and Ngqura Port is a 12-hectare laydown area designed to be a temporary storage site for abnormal cargo. The project which cost R9 million, was started in 2014 and started operating in April 2015.

== Economic impact ==
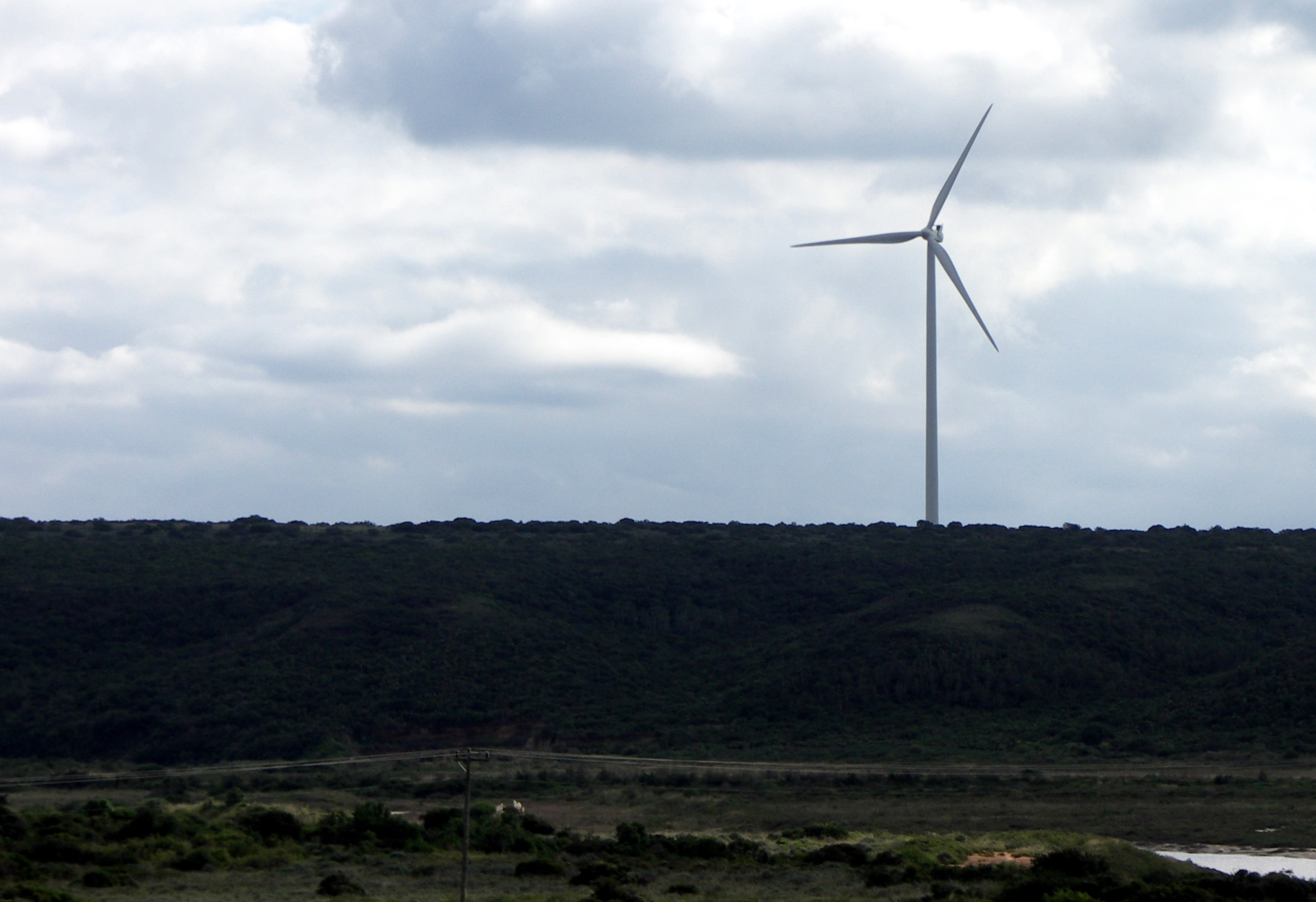
The first turbine of the Coega Wind Farm

At the beginning of 2017, Coega had attracted 54 new investors with over R30 billion investment since it was established in 1999. During the 2015/2016 financial year, the SEZ made R12 billion through investments.

In January 2017, the SEZ reported that there were 36 operational investors with a combined investment value of R6.6 billion. In January 2017, in its June 2016/2017, Coega announced that it had signed 16 new investors valued at R11.69 billion and created 16500 jobs.

The Coega SEZ reached 7 170 Operational jobs and 9 330 new construction jobs both in the SEZ and new infrastructure projects were created in 2016/2017.

5 886 people were trained and the SMME spend reached 36% during the financial year of 2016/2017. 555 people are currently contracted on the projects in the SEZ, and 70% of them are Nelson Mandela Bay-based residents. SEZ investment projects and infrastructure development programmes created more than 83 405 jobs in the past eight years.

== Awards ==
- Infrastructure Development category winner at the Vision 2030 Awards
- Top Performing Public Service Award in South Africa at the 14th Annual Business Awards
- Three 14th Annual Oliver Empowerment Awards -Legends of Empowerment & Transformation, Job Creation Award and Top Empowered Vision 2030 Award
