= Redhouse, South Africa =

Redhouse
- Location within Eastern Cape Location within South Africa
- Coordinates: 33°50′S 25°34′E
- Country: South Africa
- Province: Eastern Cape
- Municipality: Nelson Mandela Bay
- Main Place: Port Elizabeth

Area
  - Total: 0.78 km^{2} (0.30 sq mi)

Population (2011)
  - Total: 375
  - Density: 480/km^{2} (1,200/sq mi)

Racial makeup (2011)
  - Black African: 16.5%
  - Coloured: 2.1%
  - Indian/Asian: 0.8%
  - White: 78.9%
  - Other: 1.6%

First languages (2011)
  - English: 67.9%
  - Xhosa: 17.1%
  - Afrikaans: 12.8%
  - Southern Ndebele: 1.1%
  - Other: 1.1%
- Time zone: UTC+2 (SAST)
- Postal code (street): 6215
- PO box: 6215

Redhouse is a small village in the Eastern Cape of South Africa, located to the north of the city of Port Elizabeth. It is adjacent to a declared wetland reserve, soon hopefully to be a Ramsar site.

The village is situated on the Zwartkops River, and is host to the Redhouse Yacht Club. The village was built around the Redhouse train station, which is a stopping point for passenger and freight trains coming from or going to the Port Elizabeth harbour. There are over 10,000 water birds here, in the summer, including flamingos, which attract tourists. There are no shops or businesses in Redhouse, apart from two bed and breakfast establishments. There is a small primary school, a church, a lawn bowling club, a squash court, a sailing club, library, and village town hall.
