= KwaNobuhle =

- Location within Eastern Cape Location within South Africa
- Coordinates: 33°46′S 25°24′E
- Country: South Africa
- Province: Eastern Cape
- Municipality: Nelson Mandela Bay

Area
  - Total: 23.48 km^{2} (9.07 sq mi)

Population (2011)
  - Total: 107,474
  - Density: 4,577/km^{2} (11,860/sq mi)

Racial makeup (2011)
  - Black African: 99.1%
  - Coloured: 0.5%
  - Indian/Asian: 0.1%
  - White: 0.1%
  - Other: 0.3%

First languages (2011)
  - Xhosa: 94.3%
  - English: 2.4%
  - Other: 3.4%
- Time zone: UTC+2 (SAST)
- PO box: 6242
- Area code: 041

KwaNobuhle is the largest township on the outskirts of Uitenhage (Kariega) in the Eastern Cape province of the Republic of South Africa. It was formed during the time of Forced Removals, officially opened in 1967. The meaning of KwaNobuhle is "beautiful place".

== History ==
=== Early history ===
Long before colonial conquest, the Eastern Cape was home to Xhosa-speaking people, including the abaThembu and namaMfengu. While there is no specific archaeological or ethnographic site directly linked to KwaNobuhle, the broader region formed part of traditional Nguni / Xhosa territories.

Uitenhage was founded in 1804 by the Dutch colonial government. The land was primarily used for farming or grazing, typical of peri-urban areas near colonial towns like Uitenhage. It was sparsely populated, with no dense settlements or formal housing infrastructure. Some parts were likely owned by white farmers, as per the colonial and apartheid-era land ownership patterns. Older residents of KwaNobuhle remember farm land such as kwaSaneyisi. Reference is also made to older names of lands around KwaNobuhle such as eGxamesini.

As Uitenhage industrialised in the 19th and early 20th centuries (e.g., with the establishment of rail and manufacturing), Black and Coloured South Africans were increasingly pushed out of central areas through racist urban planning. By the 1950s, overcrowding in places like kwaLanga and eXaba (older Black townships near Uitenhage) led to state planning for KwaNobuhle as a “Native” township under apartheid’s Group Areas Act.

=== 1960 - 1969 ===
KwaNobuhle was established as a dormitory town situated approximately four kilometers south of Uitenhage (now known as Kariega), near Port Elizabeth (now known as Gqeberha), in the Eastern Cape.

The name KwaNobuhle translates to "a place of beauty" in English. This town traces its origins back to 1967. It was established in order to house those residents of the old Uitenhage suburbs of kwaLanga, eXaba and New Gubbs who, at that time, were being displaced from their homes by the authorities under provisions of the Group Areas Act.

=== 1970 - 1979 ===
There was continued expansion of KwaNobuhle to accommodate rising urban Black population. KwaNobuhle became more politically aware; youth involvement in movements also grew due to increasing frustration over lack of infrastructure, housing shortages, and oppressive local government policies.

Below are the number of stands for the first sections of the township.

Township Development
Suburb Name	Suburb Number	Number of Stands	Year Developed	Developed By
Angola	Extension 1	2 500	1967	Uitenhage Municipality
Mocambique	Extension 2	2 000	1974/5	Uitenhage Municipality

=== 1980 - 1989 ===
This is regarded as the most turbulent decade in the history of KwaNobuhle. Extensions 3, 4A, 4B were developed to manage overcrowding.

Township Development
Suburb Number	Suburb Name	Number of Stands	Year Developed	Developed By
Example	Extension 3	1 815	1980/81	Bantu Affairs Administration Board
Comfihomes	Extension 4	3 714	1984/5	Owners
Tyoksville	Extension 5	187	1984/5	Owners
Tyoksville	Extension 6	1 012	1986	Owners
Tyoksville	Extension 7	2 071	1986	Owners
Tyoksville	Extension 8	4 033	1986	Owners
Other	Other	Other	Other	Other

However, tensions rose due to poor living conditions and increased rent / service charges. In 1984, the residents embarked on a protest about rent hikes. The youth formed resistance groups like Uitenhage Youth Congress to strengthen the resistance. At the height of the political unrest, on 21 Mar 1985, police open fire on a funeral procession in Langa (linked to KwaNobuhle activists), killing 35 people. This is remembered as the Uitenhage Massacre.

In 1986, another mass occurrence of forced removals took place. Up to 47,000 people forcibly relocated to new areas like Tyoksville (Extensions 4C–8), many living in shacks. The following two years, 1987-1989 saw a surge in “black-on-black” violence, often incited by government-backed vigilante groups (e.g., the Peacemakers). ANC and PAC-aligned youth groups clashed amid infiltration by state agents. Activists were tortured, killed, or went into hiding. At this time, political funerals become flashpoints.

=== 1990 - 1999 ===
The early 1990s were a period when South Africa was making a transition into democracy. Around this time, KwaNobuhle experienced both relief and lingering violence tied to political tensions. After the 1994 elections that the ANC won, the Langa Massacre memorial that was vandalized in 1987 was restored in 1994 in KwaNobuhle Cemetery.

- Ukwakhiwa kweChris Hani
- Kiribands

=== 2000 - 2009 ===
KwaNobuhle remained a symbol of resistance and historical trauma. Ongoing development projects attempted to improve services. Civil society continue to commemorate past atrocities through education, museums, and annual memorials.

In 2000, VW workers in KwaNobuhle were dismissed following protests linked to NUMSA union leadership, highlighting labor tensions.

- VW Workers Dismissed (2000)
- Amadlozi

=== 2010 - 2019 ===
In December 2012, the R20 million LoveLife Youth Centre—funded by Volkswagen and iG Metal—opened, offering sports, HIV/AIDS counselling, outreach to 20 schools, and engaging approximately 20,000 youth, annually. In 2019, during municipal budget meetings, residents demanded better roads, sanitation, street lighting, old-age homes, and small-business support. The mayor pledged 80% of capital spending would go to poor areas like KwaNobuhle

=== 2020 - Present ===
As part of a Ford–World Vision initiative in Nelson Mandela Bay, KwaNobuhle was among communities receiving atmospheric water-from-air units, serving ~1,100 people between Nov 2019–Mar 2020. With Kouga Dam supplies hitting <5%, the municipality installed 100 water tanks at 50 sites in July 2021 and began a new pipeline connecting to the Gariep Dam via Nooitgedacht.

In October 2024 Ndlambe Street began crumbling after flood damage, worsened by increased truck and taxi traffic. Ongoing closure of the Matanzima Bridge led to major congestion on Nomakhwezana Road and Ndlambe Street, with residents pleading for municipal solutions.

Cable theft at Mabandla Bridge left parts of the township dark for nearly two weeks, disrupting homes, food storage, and water pumps; electricity restoration reached ~90% by Feb 9, but some areas remained offline.

== Education ==
=== Pre-Schools ===
Listed in alphabetical order.

No.	Pre-School Name	Comment
	Khanya PrS	
	Ruth Dano PrS	

=== Primary Schools ===
Listed in alphabetical order.

No.	School name	Comment
Junior Primary Schools
	Alex Jayiya PS	
	Ashton Gontshi PS	
	James Ntungwana PS	
	Magqabi PS	
	Melumzi PS	
	Mngcunube PS	
	Nokwezi PS	
	Nosipho PS	
	Nozizi Luzipho PS	
	Ntlemeza PS	
	Vuba PS	
Senior Primary Schools
	Hombakazi PS	
	Mjuleni PS	
	Mthonjeni PS	
	Phindubuye PS	
	Phakamile PS	
	RH Godlo PS	
	Sikhothina PS	
	Stephen Nkomo PS	
	Tulwana PS	

=== High Schools ===
Listed in alphabetical order.

No.	School name	Comment
	Molly Blackburn HS	
	Nkululeko HS	
	Phaphani HS	
	Solomon Mahlangu HS	
	Thanduxolo HS	
	Tinarha HS	
	VM Kwinana HS	

=== Higher Education ===
Listed in alphabetical order.

No.	Institution Name	Comment
1	Eastcape Midlands TVET College	

=== Special school and extra classes ===
Listed in alphabetical order.

No.	Institution Name	Comment
1	LS Ngonyama (LSN) Technology Centre	
2	Mzamomhle Special School	
3	Kutlwanong Science and Mathematics Program	

== Health ==
The public Laetitia Bam Day Hospital (eDay) is the primary healthcare facility in KwaNobuhle. It handles outpatient consultations, maternal / child health, minor trauma, TB care, and chronic disease management. As of early 2020, the facility was undergoing major renovation, with temporary structures in place, creating challenges such as shared waiting areas and limited trauma space.

There are private healthcare providers such as the:

- Blue Lite Clinic – an NGO-run private clinic based in Ward 47 (Peace Village). Offers first-line care including family planning, basic assessments, TB outreach, and weekly visits from a government nursing sister.
- Private Practice – Several practitioners, GPs, Dentists, etc. (i.e. iiSurgery), operate in the community offering fee-based services.

== Economy ==
KwaNobuhle spans around 23.5 km² with a population exceeding 100,000 (2011 census). Its proximity to Uitenhage’s automotive firms—including VW and Goodyear (now closed in June 2025) — offers local employment, especially through supplier parks.

While formal jobs exist, many residents rely on the informal economy—spaza shops, hair salons, car repairs, and street vending—mirroring broader Eastern Cape dynamics with high underemployment and limited capital access.

== Sport, Arts and Culture ==
=== Sport ===
- KwaNobuhle Sports Stadium / Multipurpose Centre A formal venue for cricket, soccer, and local athletics. However, in 2018, it was flagged as the most dilapidated in the metro, with cracked pavilions and safety issues—prioritising it for repairs under the Safety at Sports and Recreational Events Act (SASREA) . The stadium remains vital for youth programmes and community sports events .
- Jabavu Stadium A community sports ground used for school sports, rugby, and possibly cultural gatherings.

=== Arts and Culture ===
- Babs Madlakane Community Hall A multipurpose public hall used for music concerts, cultural performances, community meetings, and events like weddings.
- KwaNobuhle Library A public library that supports literacy, school projects, arts-based educational programmes, and reading clubs.
- LoveLife Youth Centre A flagship youth development hub, known for arts engagement, workshops, leadership growth, and community events. Highly valued by local youth as a safe and empowering space.
- KwaNobuhle Youth Services Centre Initiated by the municipality and architecture firm noh, this centre transformed a high-visibility intersection into a formal hub for youth-led street businesses and civic engagement.

== Programmes ==
=== SMME Development ===
A Township Development Strategy (2018–2022) by the Sustainable Livelihoods Foundation (commissioned by Volkswagen B-BBEE Trust) surveyed and supported micro-enterprises in KwaNobuhle.

- Focused on sectors like automotive services, hair and beauty, recycling, and creative industries.
- Phase two trained 45 entrepreneurs over nine months in business finance, marketing, digital tools. Many saw increased turnover, better branding, and stronger networks.

=== Agricultural Innovation ===
In 2013, the Department of Science & Technology and EU launched an essential‑oils production cluster in KwaNobuhle.

- Based on a rose‑scented geranium cultivar, expanding from 12 ha to intended 30 ha output.
- Aimed at job creation (about 31 full-time roles), skills development (horticulture, distillation, management) and catalyzing agri-business growth.

=== Education and Youth Empowerment ===
In May 2025, Volkswagen Group Africa opened the KwaNobuhle Maths and Science Centre at Solomon Mahlangu Secondary School.

- Plans to invest ~R25 million over four years (2025–28).
- Will support two cohorts (~200 Grade 10 learners per year) with STEM tutoring until 2027 / 28.
- Aims to foster future engineers and innovators.

== Key Challenges ==
=== Water Supply ===
KwaNobuhle has been one of the townships in the region that have experienced problems with disrupted water supply or water restrictions during droughts due low levels in the Kouga Dam and Lourie Dam. Completion of the Nooitgedacht water scheme, implemented by Amatola Water and financed by the Department of Water and Sanitation is seen as a way to alleviate these problems.

Other longstanding challenges include:

- Unemployment and poverty — remain significant barriers; many rely on small-scale informal trade.
- Limited access to capital and business mentorship — impedes scaling of township enterprises.
- Persistent infrastructure gaps — poor roads, inconsistent water / sanitation—hinder economic growth.

Yet partnerships involving government, NGOs, community groups, and VWGA offer pathways for skills-building, youth development, and enterprise incubation.
