= Bethelsdorp =

Town in Eastern Cape, South Africa

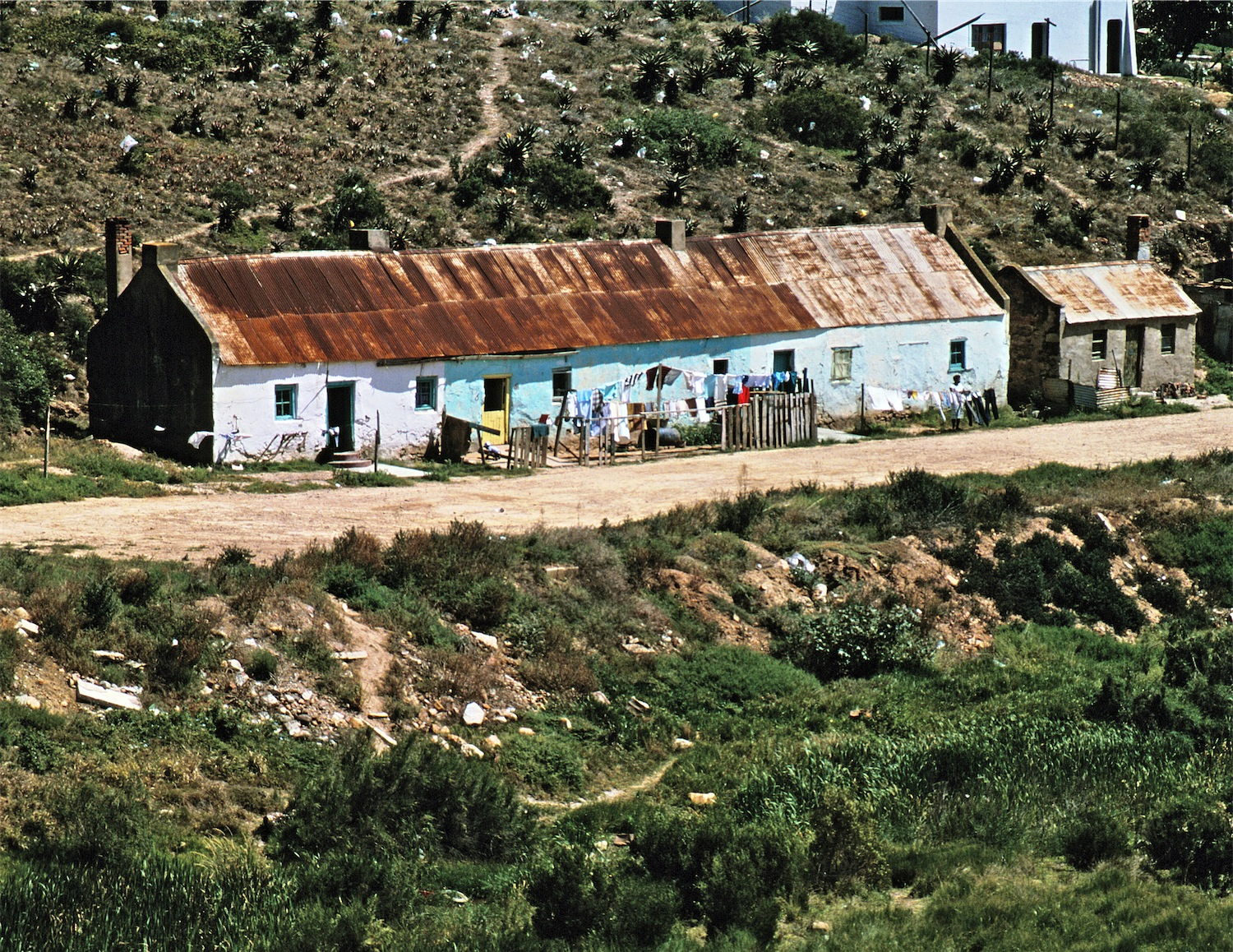
- Almshouses, Alms Street, Bethelsdorp

- Location within Eastern Cape Location within South Africa
- Coordinates: 33°53′S 25°30′E
- Country: South Africa
- Province: Eastern Cape
- Municipality: Nelson Mandela Bay
- Established: 1803

Area
  - Total: 36.62 km^{2} (14.14 sq mi)

Population (2011)
  - Total: 182,012
  - Density: 4,970/km^{2} (12,870/sq mi)

Racial makeup (2011)
  - Black African: 34.1%
  - Coloured: 64.4%
  - Indian/Asian: 0.6%
  - White: 0.2%
  - Other: 0.8%

First languages (2011)
  - Afrikaans: 57.8%
  - Xhosa: 28.7%
  - English: 11.2%
  - Other: 2.3%
- Time zone: UTC+2 (SAST)
- Postal code (street): 6059
- PO box: 6003
- Area code: +27 (0)41

Bethelsdorp is a town in Nelson Mandela Bay Metropolitan Municipality in the Eastern Cape province of South Africa, 20 km north-west of Port Elizabeth.

== History ==
The town was established in 1803 by Rev. J.T. van der Kemp on the farm Roodepas of Theunis Botha as a mission station of the London Missionary Society. The name is derived from the Hebrew word Bet-el (בית אל), meaning 'House of God'.

Under the previous political dispensation, Bethelsdorp was a township almost exclusively inhabited by coloureds (Afrikaans: Kleurlinge). This changed somewhat with the end of Apartheid in South Africa in 1994, as living and trading in the township is now freely open to all races.
