= Uitenhage =

- Kariega
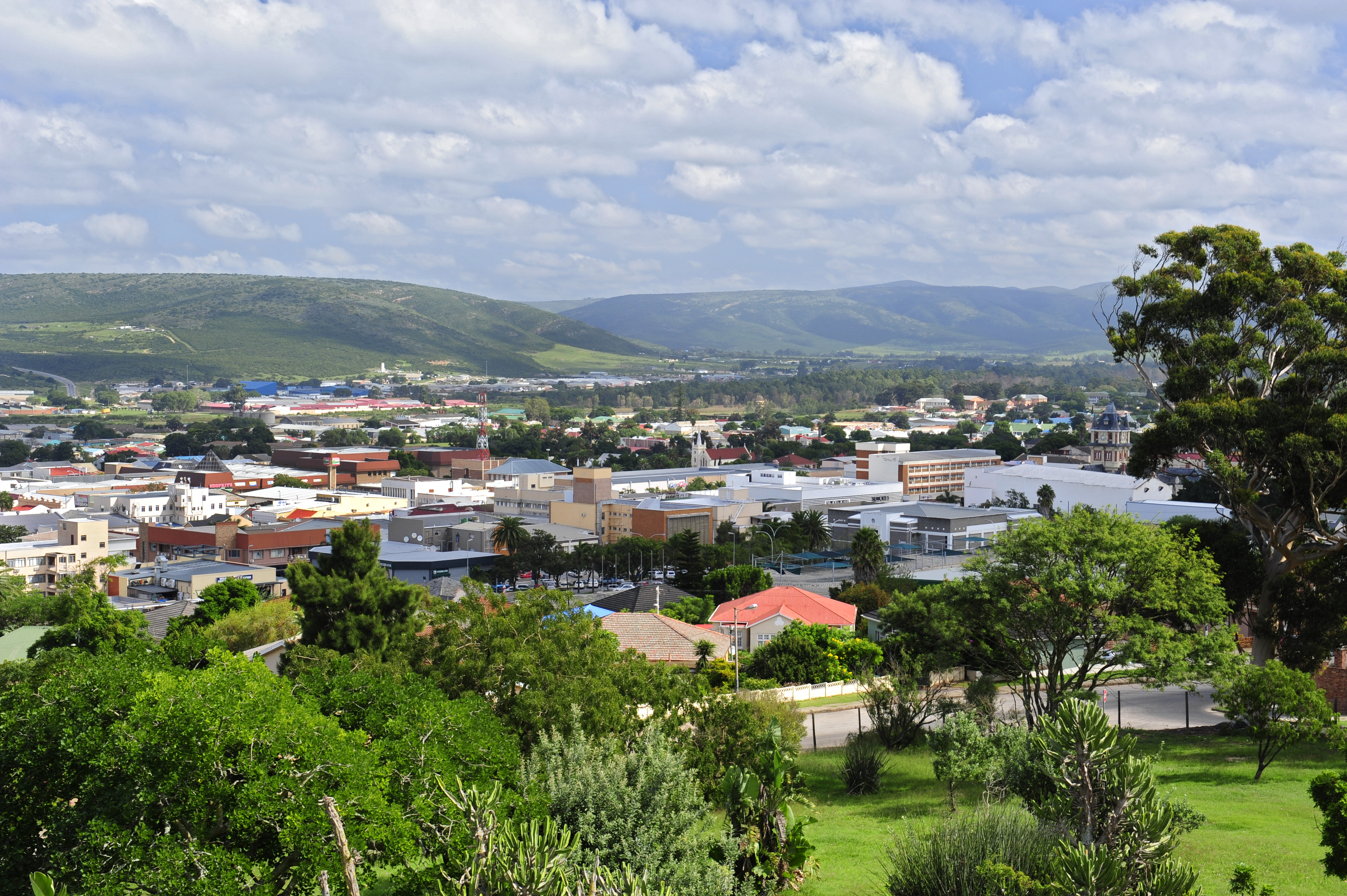
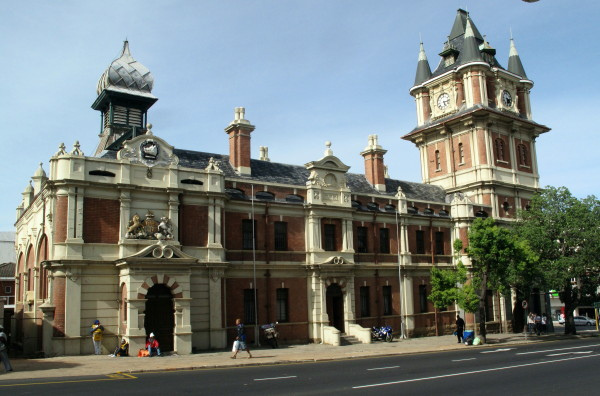
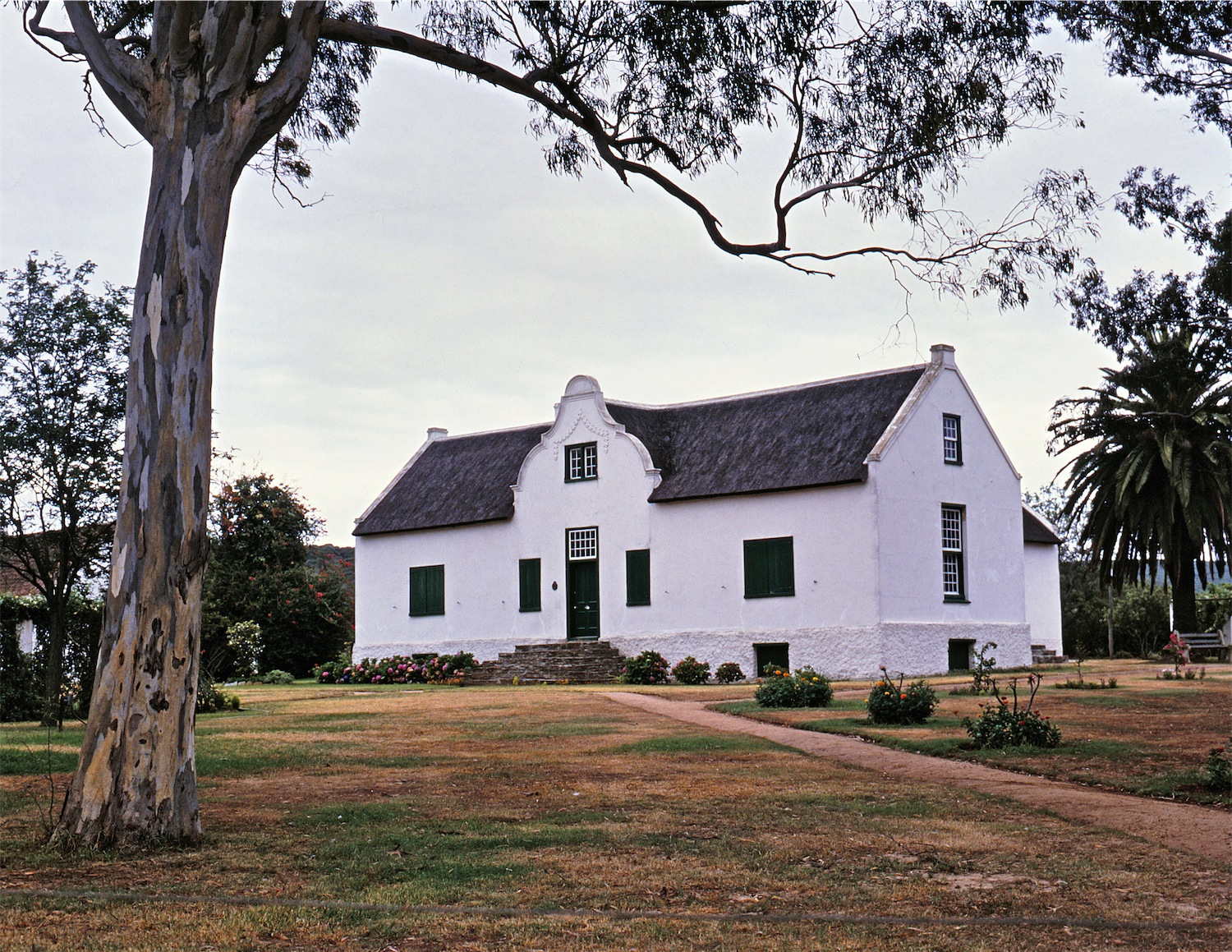
- Clockwise from Top: View of the town, Cuyler Manor, Victoria Tower.

- Location within Eastern Cape Location within South Africa Location within Africa
- Coordinates: 33°46′S 25°24′E
- Country: South Africa
- Province: Eastern Cape
- Municipality: Nelson Mandela Bay
- Established: 1804

Area
  - Total: 75.35 km^{2} (29.09 sq mi)
- Elevation: 103 m (338 ft)

Population (2011)
  - Total: 103,639
  - Density: 1,375/km^{2} (3,562/sq mi)

Racial makeup (2011)
  - Black African: 23.8%
  - Coloured: 54.7%
  - Indian/Asian: 1.2%
  - White: 18.4%
  - Other: 1.8%

First languages (2011)
  - Afrikaans: 68.9%
  - Xhosa: 17.9%
  - English: 10.4%
  - Other: 2.9%
- Time zone: UTC+2 (SAST)
- Postal code (street): 6229
- PO box: 6230
- Area code: 041

Uitenhage (/ˈjuːtənheɪɡ/ YOO-tən-hayg; Afrikaans: [œitənˈɦɑːχə]), officially renamed Kariega, is a South African town in the Eastern Cape Province. It is well known for the Volkswagen factory located there, which is the biggest car factory on the African continent. Along with the city of Port Elizabeth and the small town of Despatch, it forms part of the Nelson Mandela Bay Metropolitan Municipality.

== History ==
Uitenhage was founded on 25 April 1804 by landdrost (district magistrate) Jacob Glen Cuyler and named in honour of the Cape's Commissioner-General Jacob Abraham Uitenhage de Mist by the Dutch Cape Colony governor, Jan Willem Janssens. Uitenhage formed part of the district of Graaff Reinet (shortly after its short-lived secession).

The Cape Colony received a degree of independence when "Responsible Government" was declared in 1872. In 1875, the Cape government of John Molteno took over the rudimentary Uitenhage railway site, incorporated it into the Cape Government Railways (CGR), and began construction of the lines connecting Uitenhage to Port Elizabeth and the Southern African interior. Two years later in 1877, Uitenhage was declared a municipality.

Nearly a hundred years later, as part of the Republic of South Africa, Uitenhage became a centre for resistance against apartheid. In 1985, police opened fire on a funeral procession in Uitenhage, killing a number of unarmed people, in an event that became notorious as an example of police oppression in South Africa under apartheid.

In 2001 it was incorporated with Port Elizabeth and Despatch into the Nelson Mandela Bay Metropolitan Municipality. On 23 February 2021, Minister of Sports, Arts and Culture, Nathi Mthethwa approved and gazetted the decision to rename Uitenhage to Kariega along with the neighbouring city of Port Elizabeth, which was renamed Gqeberha.

== Geography ==
Uitenhage is situated on the banks of the Swartkops River, approximately 30 kilometres (18.6 miles) north-west of Gqeberha. Uitenhage, along with the city of Gqeberha, the neighbouring town of Despatch, the adjoining township of KwaNobuhle and surrounding areas, form the Nelson Mandela Bay Metropolitan Municipality.

Uitenhage also lies at the start of the Mohair Route which leads along Route 75 towards Graaff-Reinet (the centre for mohair farming in South Africa), 228 kilometres or 142 miles to the northwest via Jansenville on Route 75.

Climate data for Uitenhage (normals 1993-2022, elevation: 157 m or 515 ft)
Month	Jan	Feb	Mar	Apr	May	Jun	Jul	Aug	Sep	Oct	Nov	Dec	Year
Daily mean °C (°F)	22.7 (72.9)	22.9 (73.2)	21.7 (71.1)	19.3 (66.7)	16.9 (62.4)	14.9 (58.8)	14.3 (57.7)	14.8 (58.6)	16.1 (61.0)	18.0 (64.4)	19.2 (66.6)	21.1 (70.0)	18.5 (65.3)
Average precipitation mm (inches)	60.1 (2.37)	33.5 (1.32)	31.6 (1.24)	53.0 (2.09)	18.5 (0.73)	35.2 (1.39)	12.4 (0.49)	36.7 (1.44)	49.8 (1.96)	50.1 (1.97)	72.4 (2.85)	119.7 (4.71)	573 (22.56)
Source: Climate Charts

== Industries ==
Uitenhage is known for the large industries situated there. The largest of these industries are the Volkswagen of South Africa and Goodyear factories. An automotive supplier park, Alexander Park Industrial, has also been created directly next to the Volkswagen factory, thus allowing automotive component manufacturers to construct their manufacturing plants close by. Other industries of note are the food processing giant, Sovereign Foods, located in Kruisrivier industrial area and The Nelson Mandela Bay Logistics Park which hosts several other industries, including Fauricia. These industries are heavily interlinked.

== Transport ==
=== Roads ===
The R75 highway, also known as Route 75, bypasses Uitenhage to the east, heading north–south from Graaff-Reinet to Gqeberha with interchanges at the M19, M6, R334 and Graaff-Reinet Road. The R334 connects Uitenhage with Coega to the east and with KwaNobuhle and the R102 (near Van Stadens Pass) to the south-west.

The town is also intersected by metropolitan routes such as the M6 (Caledon Street; Union Avenue) to Despatch in the east, the M10 (Durban Street; Algoa Road) to Bethelsdorp in the south-west, the M19 (Botha Street) to Despatch and the M22 (Marconi Street; Mel Brooks Avenue) to KwaNobuhle in the south.

The main streets through the CBD, known as Uitenhage Central, include Cuyler Street, Caledon Street in Upper Central and Durban Street in Lower Central.

== Notable people ==
- Lloyiso Bala, R&B singer; part of Bala Brothers group and leading kwaito group TKZee
- Mihlali Mosi, professional Rugby Player from Muir College Boys' High School
- Linky Boshoff, South African tennis player from Riebeek College Girls' High School
- Okkert Brits, Olympic pole vaulter
- Joseph Petrus Hendrik Crowe, British Army officer who was awarded the Victoria Cross
- Deshun Deysel, member of the 1996 South African Everest Expedition
- Carel Fourie, Springbok rugby wing; from Die Brandwag Hoërskool
- Nantie Hayward, South African cricketer who now plays in the Indian Cricket League
- Allan Hendrickse, preacher-teacher-politician during the apartheid era
- Mcebisi Jonas, former deputy Finance Minister, active member of ANC's Uitenhage branch
- Deon Kayser, rugby player
- Johann van der Merwe, Springbok rugby centre 1969/70 British tour; from Die Brandwag Hoërskool
- Bicks Ndoni, former mayor of Uitenhage and ANC politician
- Smuts Ngonyama, ANC National Spokesman during Thabo Mbeki's Era. Recently appointed South African Ambassador to Spain
- Anrich Nortje, South African cricketer
- Charles Robert Redcliffe, Labour Party politician, community leader and anti-apartheid activist
- Christo van Rensburg, South African tennis player, ATP-ranked
- Enoch Sontonga, composer of Nkosi Sikelel' iAfrika which is now part of the national anthem
- James Wide, double leg amputee railway signalman and owner of Jack the signal-baboon
- Garth Wright, Springbok rugby scrum-half from Muir College
- Lee-Roy Wright, South African actor and television presenter

== Notable animals ==
- Jack – a chacma baboon trained to assist signalman James Wide, who had both legs amputated.

== Notable buildings ==
- Masjid al-Qudama (1849), is one of the oldest mosques in the country.
- Cuyler Manor, historic house museum

== Coats of arms ==
Drostdy — In 1804, the Cape colonial government assigned the shield of Jacob Abraham Uitenhage de Mist's arms to the new Uitenhage drostdy. The arms were Sable, a cross moline Argent, i.e. a silver cross moline on a black shield. An anchor was placed behind the shield. The British authorities discontinued the drostdy seals in 1814, and replaced them with the royal coat of arms.

Municipality — In 1881, the Uitenhage municipal council adopted the De Mist arms, complete with a crest consisting of a cross moline issuing from a gold coronet. The arms were registered with the Cape Provincial Administration in September 1956 and at the Bureau of Heraldry in June 1994.

Divisional council — The Uitenhage divisional council (the local authority for the rural areas outside the town) assumed a coat of arms in 1968. The arms were granted by the provincial administrator in August 1968 and registered at the Bureau of Heraldry in June 1972.

On the arms were stated: "Or, a triple crowned tree Vert, the trunk entwined with the Batavian tricolour; on a chief wavy Sable a cross moline between dexter a pickaxe and hammer in saltire, handles downwards and sinister two scrolls in saltire, Argent." In layman's terms, the design was a golden shield displaying, from top to bottom, a crossed pickaxe and hammer, a cross moline and two crossed scrolls on a black horizontal strip with a wavy edge, and a triple-crowned tree with a Batavian Republic flag wrapped around it.

The crest was an elephant, and the motto Per laborem ad honorem.

== Bibliography ==
- Sellick, W.S.J. (1904). Uitenhage, past and present : souvenir of the Centenary, 1804-1904.
