= Swartkops River =

Eastern Cape, South Africa watercourse

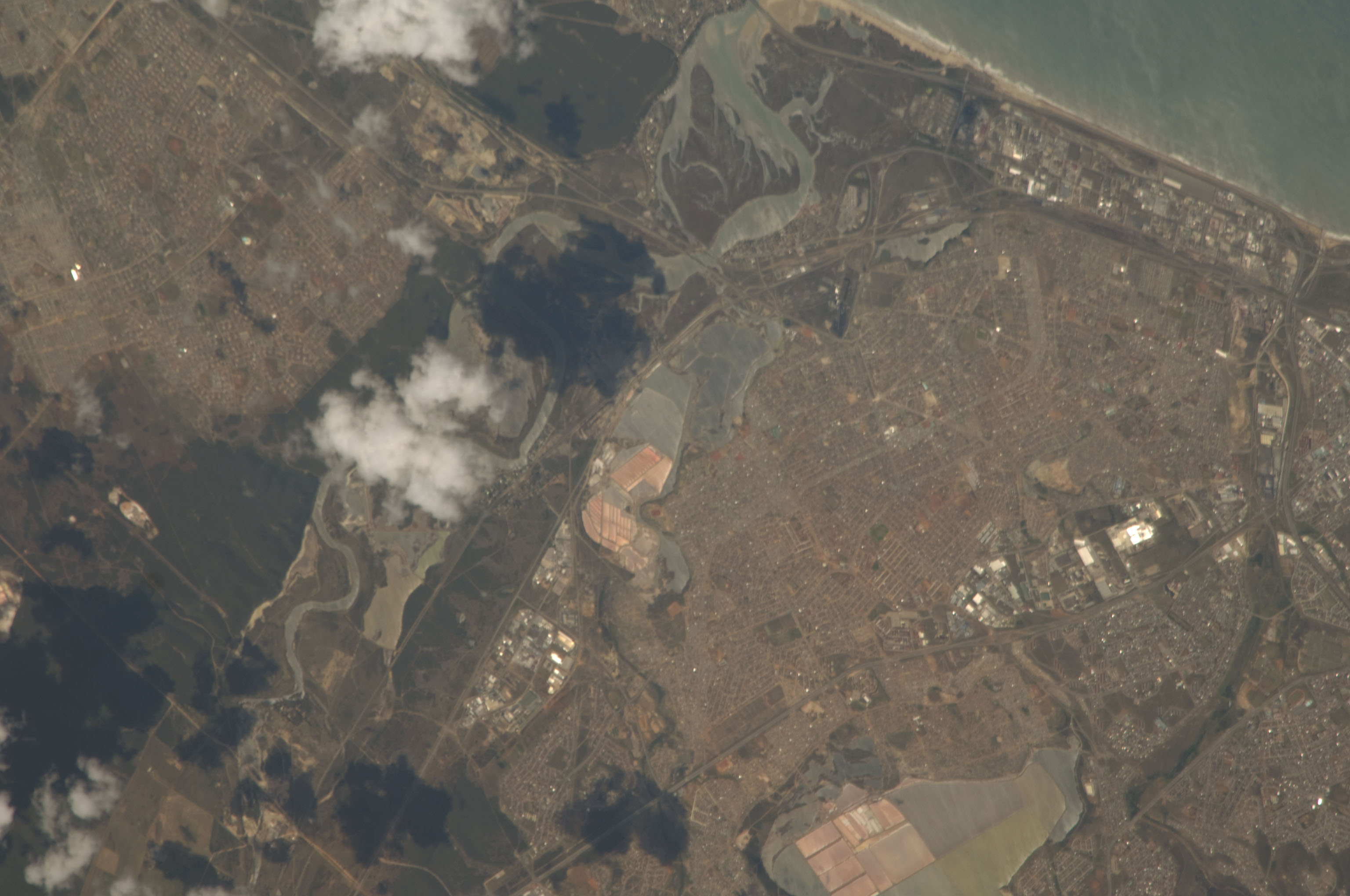
- View of South Africa taken during ISS Expedition 18, 2008

Physical characteristics
- Mouth
  - coordinates: 33.8633°S 25.6294°E

Swartkops River, also Zwartskop River, (Afrikaans: black hills) is a watercourse in the Eastern Cape province of South Africa. The source of the Swartkops is near Cockscombe Mountain, and it flows east into the Algoa Bay of the Indian Ocean in Bluewater Bay, just outside Gqeberha. Its two main tributaries are the northern Kwa-Zunga River and the southern Elands River. The river is also fed by Motherwell Canal, Markman Canal, and Chatty River, which are also sources of water pollution. The river's Groendal Dam was constructed in 1933. The Swartzkops watershed lies within the Uitenhage Artesian Basin. The river suffers from sewage pollution, litter, and algae blooms.
