= Nelson Mandela Bay Metropolitan Municipality =

Nelson Mandela Bay
- Metropolitan municipality
- Nelson Mandela Bay Metropolitan Municipality
- Seal

- Location in the Eastern Cape
- Coordinates: 33°57′S 25°36′E
- Country: South Africa
- Province: Eastern Cape
- Seat: Gqeberha (Port Elizabeth)
- Wards: 60

Government
  - Type: Municipal council
  - Mayor: Babalwa Lobishe (ANC)

Area
  - Total: 1,959 km^{2} (756 sq mi)

Population (2022)
  - Total: 1,190,496
  - Density: 607.7/km^{2} (1,574/sq mi)

Racial makeup (2022)
  - Black African: 62.7%
  - Coloured: 19.2%
  - Indian/Asian: 1.2%
  - White: 15.7%

First languages (2011)
  - Xhosa: 53.9%
  - Afrikaans: 29.3%
  - English: 13.5%
  - Other: 3.3%
- Time zone: UTC+2 (SAST)
- Municipal code: NMA

The Nelson Mandela Bay Municipality (Xhosa: uMasipala oMbaxa iNelson Mandela Bay; Afrikaans: Nelson Mandelabaai Metropolitaanse Munisipaliteit) is one of eight metropolitan municipalities in South Africa. It is located on the shores of Algoa Bay in the Eastern Cape province and comprises the city of Gqeberha (Port Elizabeth), the nearby towns of Kariega (Uitenhage) and Despatch, and the surrounding rural area.

The name "Nelson Mandela Bay Metropolitan Municipality" was chosen to honour former President Nelson Mandela.

== History ==
Bricks used in the Nelson Mandela Bay Metropolitan Municipality around 1903–04 may have been made from parts of the holotype of the sauropod dinosaur Algoasaurus bauri.

Established on 5 December 2000, the Nelson Mandela Bay Metropolitan Municipality was formed as an administrative area covering Gqeberha (Port Elizabeth), the neighbouring towns of Kariega (Uitenhage) and Despatch and the surrounding agricultural areas. Thus included the following cities/towns/villages:

- Beachview
- Bethelsdorp
- Colchester
- Despatch
- Gqeberha
- iBhayi
- KwaNobuhle
- Motherwell
- New Brighton
- Seaview
- Swartkops
- Uitenhage

== Demographics and statistics ==
Geographical distribution of home languages in the Nelson Mandela Bay Metro Afrikaans English Xhosa No language dominant

As of the census of 2011, there are 1,152,115 people and 324,292 households in the Nelson Mandela Bay Metropolitan Municipality.

In the 2007 census, 60.4% of respondents described themselves as Black African, 22.6% Coloured, 16.1% White and 0.9% Indian/Asian.

The largest religious groupings are Christian (89.4% of residents), no religion (6.1%), Muslim (1.5%), Jewish (0.4%) and Hindu (0.3%).

57.3% of the residents speak Xhosa as their mother tongue. Afrikaans is the mother tongue of 29.7%, and English, 12.1%.

- 16.0% of all households are single-person.
- The average household size is 3.86.
- The median age is 26 years.
- For every 100 females there are 91.2 males.
- 28.2% of the population aged 15–65 is unemployed.
- The median annual income of working adults aged 15–65 is ZAR 21 837 ($3,282).

According to the 2009 edition of the municipality's 2006–2011 Integrated Development Plan, manufacturing is the single largest contributor to the local economy (33%), followed by community services (27%). Tourism represents a key sector of the economy that has increasingly contributed to job creation in recent years, thanks in large part to the municipality's seaside location and its abundance of unspoiled beaches, of which four carry Blue Flag status.

100% of households have access to a source of water within a 200 m radius. 91% of households have access to a basic level of sanitation. 100% of households within the urban boundary have access to a basic level of solid waste removal, and 97% of households in formally demarcated municipal residential areas have access to a basic level of electricity. The municipality has 41 permanent and satellite clinics, 13 mobile clinics, eight hospitals, 22 libraries, 31 community and municipal halls, 79 sports facilities, 19 beaches, 18 pools, 273 schools, one university (the Nelson Mandela University), four technical colleges and two Further Education and Training institutions.

== Main places ==
The censuses of 2001 and 2011 divided the municipality into the following main places:

Place 2011	Place 2001	Area 2011 (km^{2})	Area 2001 (km^{2})	Population 2011	Population 2001	Most spoken language
	Beachview	-	0.78	-	500	Afrikaans
Bethelsdorp	Bethelsdorp	36.62	77.64	182,012	134,617	Afrikaans
Blue Horizon Bay	Blue Horizon Bay	1.40	2.74	419	409	Afrikaans
-	Cannonvale	-	0.69	-	196	Afrikaans
Clarendon Marine	-	6.56	-	2,434	-	no
Colchester	Colchester	5.73	1.28	2,073	743	Afrikaans
Despatch	Despatch	19.65	38.75	39,619	25,086	Afrikaans
-	Port Elizabeth (since 2021: Walmer South)	-	1.90	-	16,686	Xhosa
iBhayi	iBhayi	36.06	23.69	237,799	255,826	Xhosa
-	Kabah	-	1.68	-	3,282	Afrikaans
-	Khaya Mnandi	-	0.82	-	5,379	Xhosa
-	KwaLanga	-	0.70	-	8,196	Xhosa
-	KwaDwesi	-	5.10	-	17,733	Xhosa
KwaNobuhle	KwaNobuhle	23.48	15.34	107,474	87,585	Xhosa
Motherwell	Motherwell	25.86	29.52	140,351	117,319	Xhosa
Gqeberha	Port Elizabeth	251.03	335.30	312,392	237,500	Afrikaans
-	Seaview	-	1.60	-	732	English
Uitenhage (since 2021: Kariega)	Uitenhage	75.35	84.77	103,639	71,666	Afrikaans
Woodridge	Woodridge	4.98	0.56	362	270	Xhosa
-	Young Park	-	0.52	-	762	Afrikaans
Nelson Mandela Bay NU	Remainder of the municipality	1,472.19	1,328.77	23,542	21,281	Xhosa

== Government ==
The municipal council consists of one hundred and twenty members elected by mixed-member proportional representation. Sixty councillors are elected by first-past-the-post voting in sixty wards, while the remaining sixty are chosen from party lists so that the total number of party representatives is proportional to the number of votes received. In the local government election of 1 November 2021, no party obtained a majority on the council again. The African National Congress managed to form a minority coalition government to govern the municipality. Former councillor and businesswoman Eugene Johnson of the ANC was elected mayor on 22 November 2021, in a coalition consisting of the parties: GOOD, AIM, UDM, DOP, Northern Alliance, Patriotic Alliance and the PAC. She won against the DA's mayoral candidate, Nqaba Bhanga, by 1 vote, as a DA councillor was absent.

During a council meeting on 21 September 2022, Johnson was removed as mayor through a vote of no confidence and succeeded by the DA's Retief Odendaal. Odendaal was, in return, removed as mayor in a vote of no confidence and replaced with council speaker Gary van Niekerk on 26 May 2023. Babalwa Lobishe was then elected mayor on 31 October 2024.

The following table shows the results of the 2026 municipal election.

Party	Ward			List			Total seats
Party	Votes	%	Seats	Votes	%	Seats	Total seats
Democratic Alliance	144,201	43.98	28	145,328	44.37	25	53
African National Congress	83,026	25.32	32	83,975	25.64	0	32
Economic Freedom Fighters	17,876	5.45	0	18,487	5.64	7	7
South African Communist Party	10,926	3.33	0	10,012	3.06	4	4
Patriotic Alliance	10,038	3.06	0	9,856	3.01	4	4
Freedom Front Plus	7,679	2.34	0	8,559	2.61	3	3
United Democratic Movement	7,811	2.38	0	8,011	2.45	3	3
Mayibuye Civic Movement	5,431	1.66	0	7,207	2.20	2	2
ActionSA	5,533	1.69	0	6,316	1.93	2	2
uMkhonto weSizwe Party	3,783	1.15	0	3,963	1.21	2	2
African Christian Democratic Party	3,770	1.15	0	3,238	0.99	1	1
Afrika Mayibuye Movement	3,780	1.15	0	3,009	0.92	1	1
African Transformation Movement	3,687	1.12	0	3,030	0.93	1	1
Pan Africanist Congress of Azania	2,790	0.85	0	2,872	0.88	1	1
Independent candidates	3,847	1.17	0				0
United Progressive People Alliance	1,820	0.56	0	1,771	0.54	1	1
African Independent Congress	1,784	0.54	0	1,602	0.49	1	1
Democratic Movement	1,603	0.49	0	1,406	0.43	1	1
National Alliance	1,040	0.32	0	844	0.26	1	1
21 other parties	7,457	2.27	0	8,060	2.46	0	0
Total	327,882	100.00	60	327,546	100.00	60	120
Valid votes	327,882	98.14		327,546	98.24		
Invalid/blank votes	6,201	1.86		5,863	1.76		
Total votes	334,083	100.00		333,409	100.00		
Registered voters/turnout	636,660	52.47		636,660	52.37		

== See also ==
- Algoa Bay
