= De Aar railway station =

Railway station in South Africa

De Aar
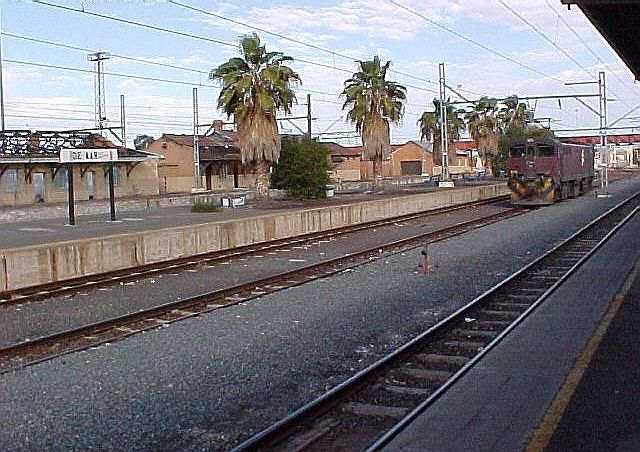

General information
- Location: Hoofstraat, De Aar 7000
- Coordinates: 30°39′3″S 24°0′48″E
- System: Railway station
- Owner: TFR
- Line: Shosholoza Meyl: Johannesburg–Cape Town Cape Town–Durban Cape Town–East London Premier Classe: Johannesburg–Cape Town
- Platforms: 1 side, 1 island
- Tracks: 3

Construction
- Structure type: At-grade
Location

De Aar railway station is a railway station serving the town of De Aar, in the Northern Cape province of South Africa. De Aar is a major junction where the Cape Town–Kimberley main line meets a line from Port Elizabeth and another from Upington and Namibia. As such, it is served by several routes of the Shosholoza Meyl inter-city service.

Preceding station	Shosholoza Meyl	Following station
Kimberley towards Johannesburg	Johannesburg–Cape Town Tourist class trains	Hutchinson towards Cape Town
Hutchinson towards Cape Town	Cape Town–Durban Tourist class trains	Kimberley towards Durban
Oranjerivier towards Johannesburg	Johannesburg–Cape Town Economy class trains	Merriman towards Cape Town
Merriman towards Cape Town	Cape Town–Durban Economy class trains	Oranjerivier towards Durban
Merriman towards Cape Town	Cape Town–East London	Noupoort towards East London
Preceding station	Premier Classe	Following station
Kimberley towards Johannesburg	Johannesburg–Cape Town	Beaufort West towards Cape Town
