= Bloemfontein railway station =

Railway station in South Africa

Bloemfontein central
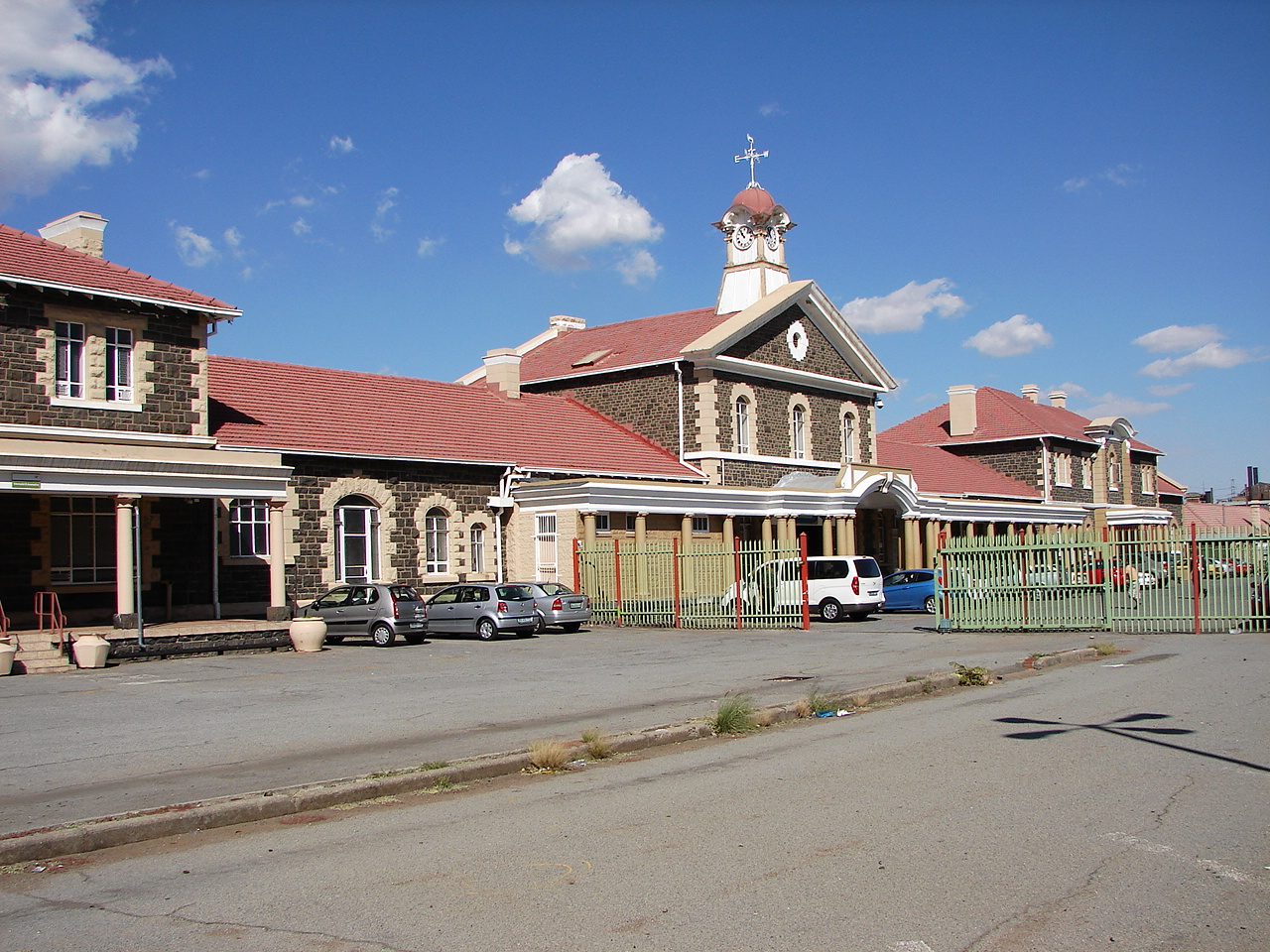
- Bloemfontein station building

General information
- Location: Harvey Road, Bloemfontein 9301
- Coordinates: 29°7′7″S 26°13′35″E
- System: Railway station
- Owner: TFR
- Line: Johannesburg–Port Elizabeth Johannesburg–East London Johannesburg–Kimberley–Bloemfontein Cape Town–Durban
- Platforms: 1 side platform, 5 islands
- Tracks: 9

Construction
- Structure type: At-grade
Location

Bloemfontein central railway station is a railway station located in Bloemfontein, Free State Province, South Africa.

The first railway line connected Bloemfontein to Cape Town in 1890, resulting in a centrally located station site on the corner of Maitland and Harvey streets, east of Kings Park. Centrally located in both the city and the nation, in March 1900 at the Battle of Paardeberg during the Second Boer War, the station became a major point of strategic fighting between the Boers and the British Army, led by General Roberts.

The modern station is served by Shosholoza Meyl inter-city trains connecting it to Johannesburg, Port Elizabeth and East London six times a week; Kimberley twice weekly; and Durban and Cape Town once weekly.

The industrial area, Hamilton, is situated to the south of the city and generates most of the stations freight traffic. During 2005-2006 over 90,000 tons of beer was received, dispatched from Rosslyn, Gauteng; 56,998 tons of fuel from East London, and 8,872 tons from Durban; and 5,000 tonnes of coal.

Preceding station	Shosholoza Meyl	Following station
Kroonstad towards Johannesburg	Johannesburg–Port Elizabeth Tourist class trains	Springfontein towards Port Elizabeth
Brandfort towards Johannesburg	Johannesburg–Port Elizabeth Economy class trains	Springfontein towards Port Elizabeth
Brandfort towards Johannesburg	Johannesburg–East London	Springfontein towards East London
Kimberley towards Cape Town	Cape Town–Durban Tourist class trains	Kroonstad towards Durban
Kimberley towards Cape Town	Cape Town–Durban Economy class trains	Brandfort towards Durban
Kimberley towards Johannesburg	Johannesburg–Kimberley–Bloemfontein	Terminus
