= Central station =

Common name for a railway station

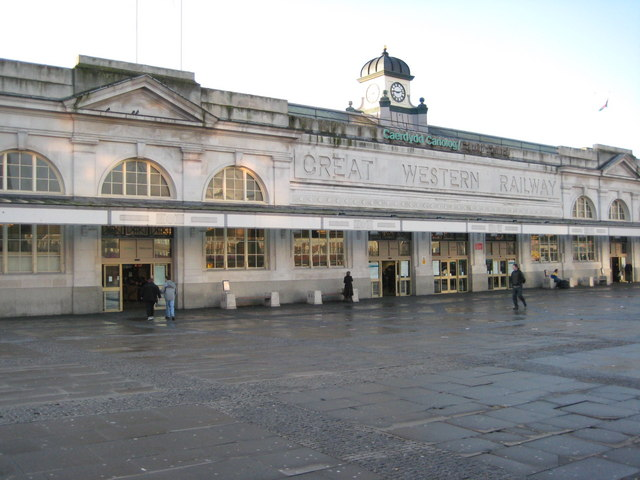
Cardiff Central railway station

Central stations or central railway stations emerged in the second half of the nineteenth century as railway stations that had initially been built on the edge of city centres were enveloped by urban expansion and became an integral part of the city centres themselves. As a result, "Central Station" is often, but not always, part of the proper name for a railway station that is the central or primary railway hub for a city.

== Development ==
=== Emergence and growth ===
Central stations emerged in the second half of the nineteenth century during what has been termed the "Railway Age". Initially railway stations were built on the edge of city centres but, subsequently, with urban expansion, they became an integral part of the city centres themselves.

For example, the first centralized railway terminal in Germany was Hanover Hauptbahnhof, built in 1879. This set the precedent for other major German cities. Frankfurt followed in 1888 and Cologne in the 1890s. Classic German central railway station architecture "reached its zenith" with the completion of Hamburg Hauptbahnhof in 1906 and Leipzig Hauptbahnhof in 1915.

In Europe, it was normal for the authorities to exercise greater control over railway development than in Britain and this meant that the central station was often the focal point of town planning. "Indeed, in most large continental cities the station was deliberately fronted by a square to set it off." During the 1880s "world leadership in large station design passed to Germany, where state funding helped secure the building of central stations on a lavish scale." By contrast, British entrepreneurialism led to a great diversity of ownership and rights and a lack of centralised coherence in the construction of major stations.

In time the urban expansion that put many of these stations at the heart of a city, also hemmed them in so that, although they became increasingly central to the town or city, they were further away from airports or, in some cases, other transport hubs such as bus stations leading to a lack of interoperability and interconnectivity between the different modes of transport.

A revival of fortunes for central stations arose during the 1980s, boosted by the advent of high speed rail and light rail services, that saw opportunities being seized for upgrading central stations and their facilities to create large intermodal transport hubs simultaneously serving many modes of transport, while providing a range of modern facilities for the traveller, creating a "city within a city."

=== Present-day function ===
==== Transport nodes ====
Today, central stations, particularly in Europe, act as termini for a multitude of rail services - suburban, regional, domestic and international - provided by national carriers or private companies, on conventional rail networks, underground railways and tram systems. These services are often divided between several levels. In many cases, central railway stations are collocated with bus stations as well as taxi services.

==== Industrial and commercial centres ====
Central railway stations are not just major transportation nodes but may also be "a specific section of the city with a concentration of infrastructure but also with a diversified collection of buildings and open spaces" which makes them "one of the most complex social areas" of the city. This has drawn in railway business - freight and local industry using the marshalling yards - and commercial business - shops, cafes and entertainment facilities.

==== High speed rail ====
The reinvigoration of central stations since the 1980s has been, in part, due to the rise of high speed rail services. But countries have taken different approaches. France gave greater weight to 'peripheral stations', stations external to cities and new high speed lines. Germany and Italy went for the modification of existing lines and central stations. Spain opted for a hybrid approach with new high speed railway lines using existing central stations.

== "Central Station" as a name ==
=== English-speaking countries ===
"Central Station" is a common proper name for a railway station that is the central or primary railway hub for a city, for example, Manchester Central, which is not to be confused with those stations in which "Central" appears in name not because they were "central" in the sense above but because they were once served by railway companies with "Central" as part of their name. For example, Leicester Central railway station was owned by the Great Central Railway, and Central Station (Chicago) was owned by the Illinois Central Railroad.

Some Great Western Railway stations in the UK had "General" in their name if they were the principal station serving the town. Apart from Wrexham General, all have been renamed.

=== Non-English-speaking countries ===
When translating foreign station names, "Central Station" is commonly used if the literal meaning of the station's name is "central station", "principal station" or "main station". An example of the last is the Danish word hovedbanegård. Travel and rail sources such as Rough Guides, Thomas Cook European Timetable and Deutsche Bahn's passenger information generally use the native name, but tourist, travel and railway operator websites as well as the English publications of some national railway operators often use "Central Station" or "central railway station" instead.

Non-English names for "Central Station" include:

- Централна гара (tsentralna gara) in Bulgarian
- střed or hlavní nádraží in Czech
- Centraal Station (abbreviated formerly as CS and currently as Centraal) in Dutch
- Gare centrale in French
- Hauptbahnhof, historically also Centralbahnhof or Zentralbahnhof, in German
- תחנה מרכזית (tahana merkazit) in Hebrew
- Stazione Centrale (abbreviated C.le) in Italian
- sentralstasjon in Norwegian
- Estação Central in Portuguese
- Estación Central in Spanish
- centralstation (abbreviated central or C) in Swedish

Non-English terms that literally mean "principal station" or "main station" are often translated into English as "Central":

- Glavni kolodvor (abbreviated Gl. kol.) in Croatian
- hlavní nádraží (abbreviated hl. n.) in Czech
- hovedbanegård (abbreviated H) in Danish
- Hauptbahnhof (abbreviated Hbf in Germany and Austria and HB in Switzerland) in German
- Dworzec Główny (abbreviated Gł.) in Polish
- hlavná stanica (abbreviated hl. st.) in Slovak

== Examples of central stations ==
The following are examples of stations from around the world where "Central Station" is part of their name in English or can be translated as such from their native language.

=== Europe ===
==== Austria ====
1. Wien Hauptbahnhof
2. Graz Hauptbahnhof
3. Linz Hauptbahnhof
4. Salzburg Hauptbahnhof
5. Innsbruck Hauptbahnhof
6. St. Pölten Hauptbahnhof
7. Wels Hauptbahnhof
8. Wörgl Hauptbahnhof
9. Leoben Hauptbahnhof

==== Belarus ====
1. Brest Central Station (Brest-Centralny, Брест-Центральный)

==== Belgium ====
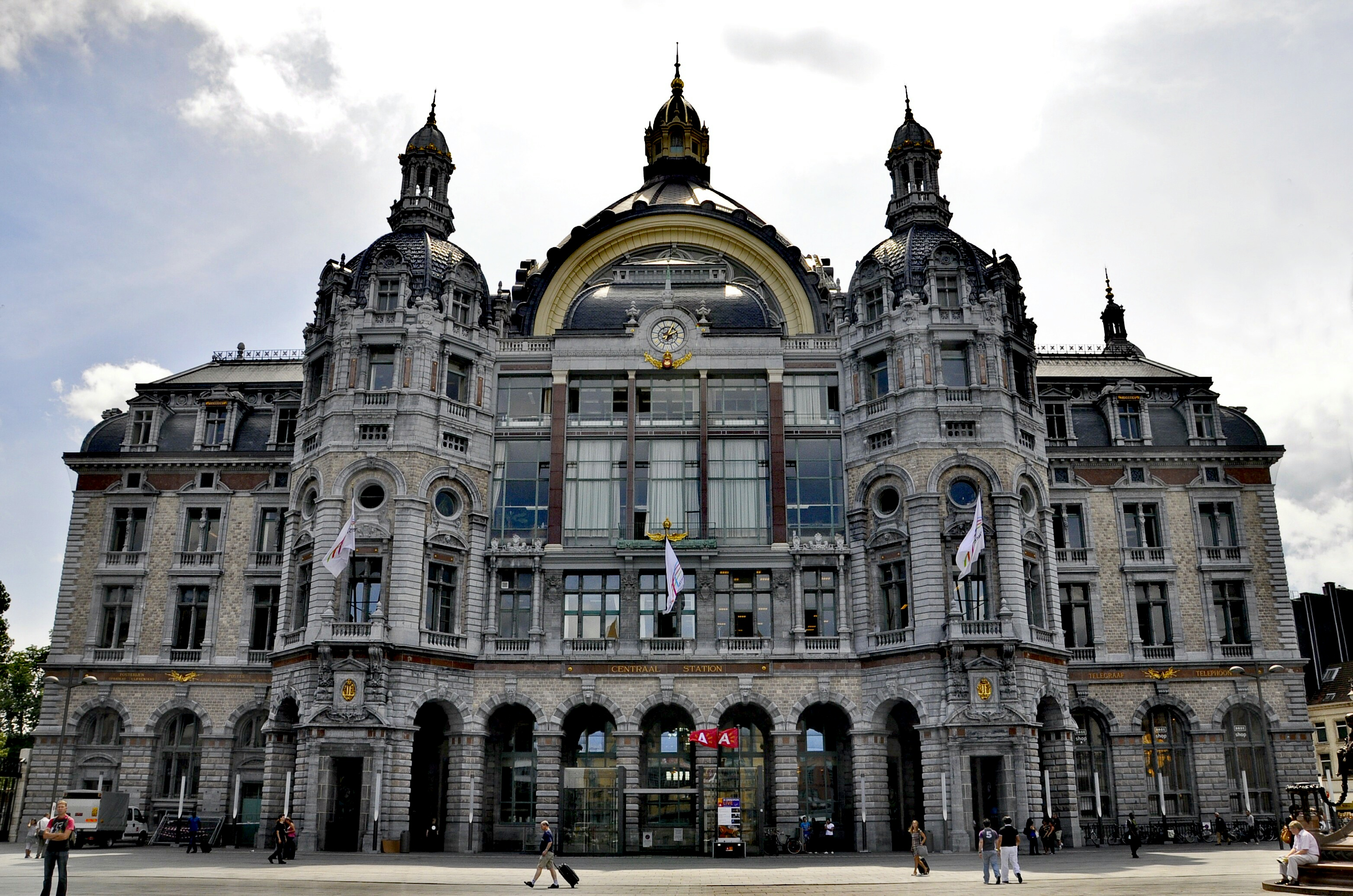
Antwerp Centraal station

Three stations in Belgium are named "-Central" (Dutch Centraal).

1. Antwerp Central Station (Antwerpen-Centraal)
2. Brussels Central Station (Bruxelles-Central / Brussel-Centraal) - not to be confused with the city's main international station, Brussels Midi (meaning "Brussels south"; the French word "Midi" is generally used as the station's name in English).
3. Verviers-Central railway station (Verviers-Central)

==== Bulgaria ====
There are three stations with "central" in their names:

1. Central Railway Station, Sofia (Централна гара София)
2. Central Railway Station, Plovdiv (Централна гара Пловдив)
3. Ruse Central railway station (Централна гара Русе)

==== Czech Republic ====
The following stations are named "hlavní nádraží" (English: 'main station', abbreviated hl.n.):

1. Brno hlavní nádraží (Brno)
2. Česká Lípa hlavní nádraží (Česká Lípa)
3. Děčín hlavní nádraží (Děčín)
4. Hradec Králové hlavní nádraží (Hradec Králové)
5. Karviná hlavní nádraží (Karviná)
6. Kutná Hora hlavní nádraží (Kutná Hora)
7. Mladá Boleslav hlavní nádraží (Mladá Boleslav)
8. Nymburk hlavní nádraží (Nymburk)
9. Olomouc hlavní nádraží (Olomouc)
10. Ostrava hlavní nádraží (Ostrava)
11. Pardubice hlavní nádraží (Pardubice)
12. Plzeň hlavní nádraží (Plzeň)
13. Praha hlavní nádraží (Prague)
  Hlavní nádraží – the corresponding metro station in Prague
14. Prostějov hlavní nádraží (Prostějov)
15. Trutnov hlavní nádraží (Trutnov)
16. Ústí nad Labem hlavní nádraží (Ústí nad Labem)

The following stations are named "střed" or "centrum", indicating their central location between other stations serving the town:

1. Brumov střed (Brumov)
2. Louny střed (Louny)
3. Mikulášovice střed (Mikulášovice)
4. Ostrava střed(Ostrava)
5. Pardubice centrum, (Pardubice)
6. Smržovka střed (Smržovka)
7. Trutnov střed (Trutnov)
8. Zlín střed (Zlín)

In addition to the above, Praha Masarykovo nádraží was named "Praha střed" from 1953 until 1990.

==== Denmark ====
Two Danish stations, as follows, have names often translated as "Central".

1. Aarhus Central Station – the busiest Danish station outside the Copenhagen area
2. Copenhagen Central Station – the largest station in Denmark

Both stations bear the title of Hovedbanegård in Danish, which literally translated means main-(rail)way-yard, but which actually refers to the infrastructure complexity, size and importance. A station of lesser importance is called a banegård. However a city can have several banegårde as well as a hovedbanegård, and several cities and towns that have a banegård such as Aalborg do not have a hovedbanegård. Thus, Copenhagen Central Station is not the most central in Copenhagen, nor is it the most central that serves a broad range of routes, that would be Nørreport Station, which has been translated into English as Nørreport Metro Station. Copenhagen Central Station is however the most important, with its many more platforms and historic facilities (that has now been moved to other locations, in response to changed need from modern locomotives, wagons and coaches), and despite serving almost the same amount of regional and intercity trains as Nørreport, it allows for longer stops and with much more room for passengers to traverse the station along serving international trains.

==== Finland ====
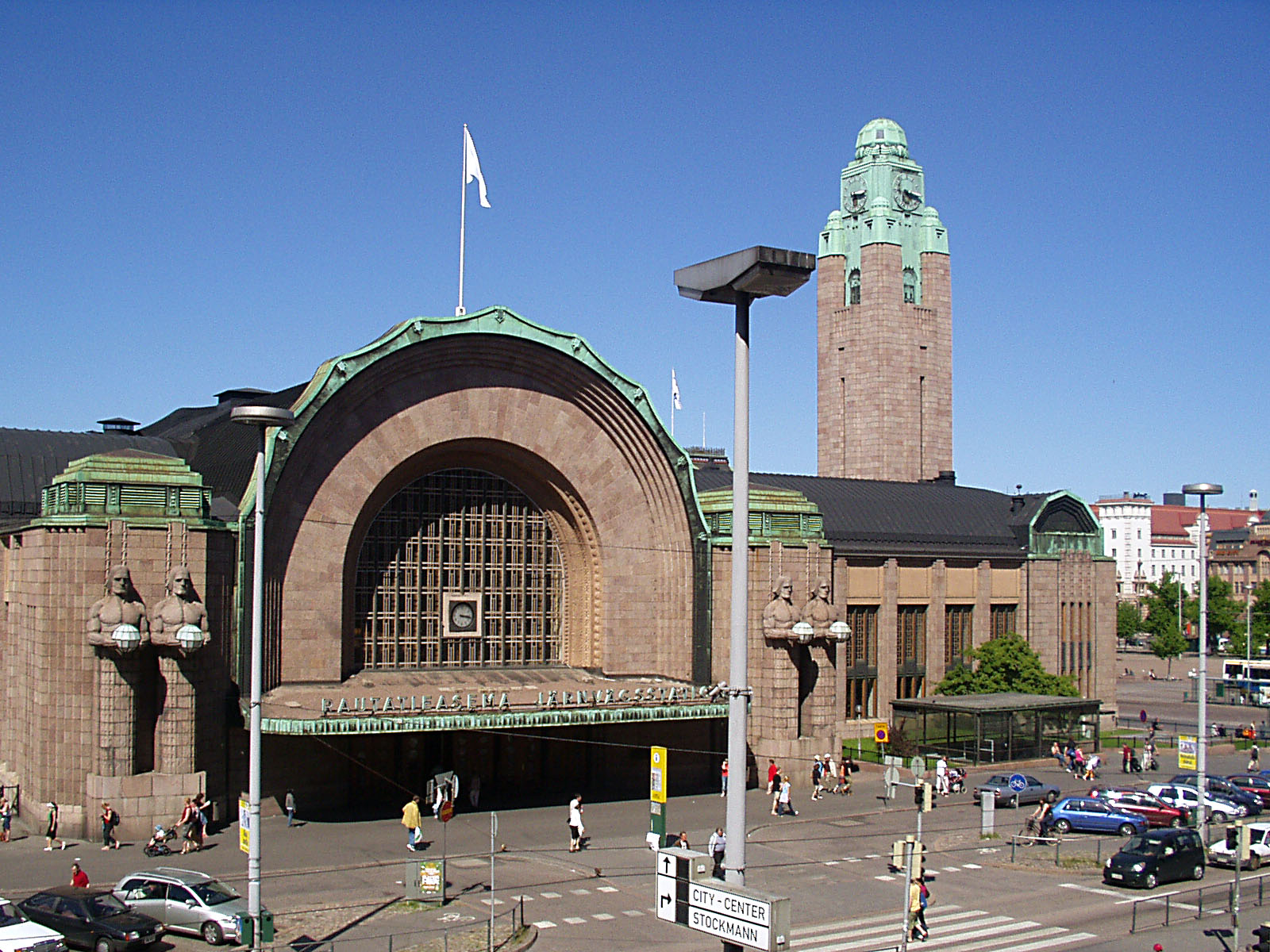
Helsinki Central Station

Two Finnish stations can be translated to central:

1. Helsinki Central railway station (Finnish: Helsingin päärautatieasema, Swedish: Helsingfors centralstation)
2. Turku Central railway station (Finnish: Turun päärautatieasema, Swedish: Åbo centralstation)

==== France ====
1. Strasbourg-Ville station, Strasbourg
2. Marseille-Saint-Charles station, Marseille
3. Nantes station, Nantes
4. Nice-Ville station, Nice

==== Germany ====
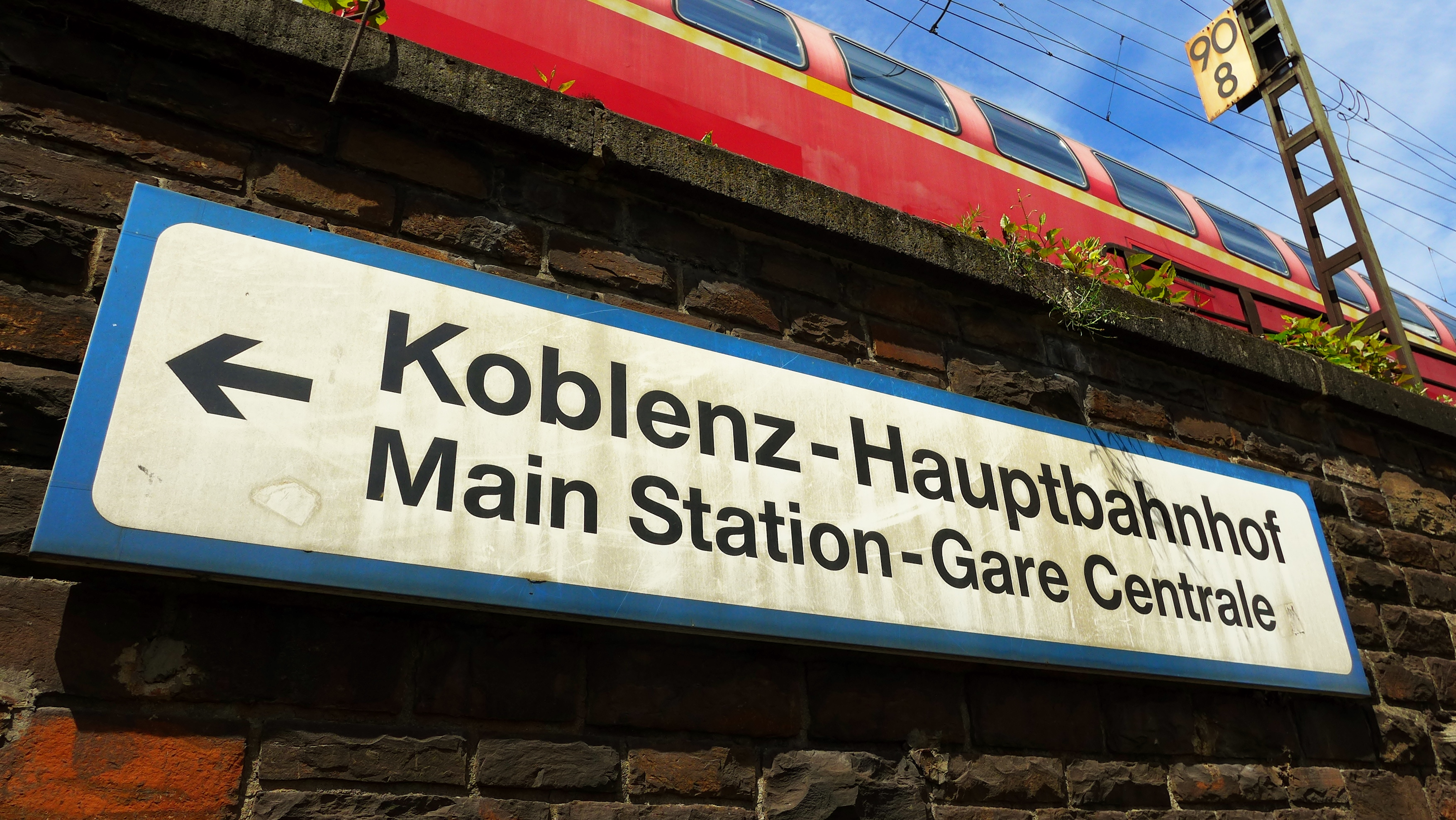
A Deutsche Bahn sign giving directions in three languages to Koblenz Hauptbahnhof.

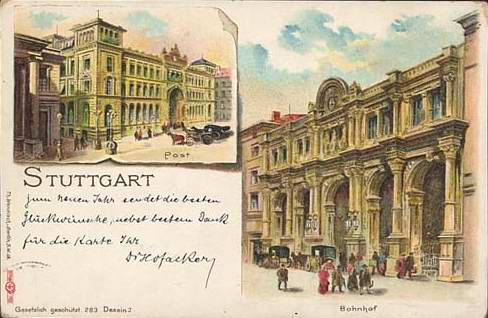
The former Stuttgart Zentralbahnhof

The German word for "central station" is Hauptbahnhof (literally "main railway station"); historically Centralbahnhof and Zentralbahnhof were also used. Geographically central stations may be named Mitte or Stadtmitte ("city centre"), e.g. Koblenz Stadtmitte station. In most German cities with more than one passenger station, the principal station is usually the Hauptbahnhof; some German sources translate this as "central station" although stations named Hauptbahnhof may not be centrally located.

While using Hauptbahnhof in its journey planner and passenger information, in English-language publications Deutsche Bahn uses variously Hauptbahnhof, Main and Central.

The following stations historically bore the name Centralbahnhof or Zentralbahnhof as part of their proper name (See Centralbahnhof):

1. Chemnitz Hauptbahnhof
2. Köln Hauptbahnhof
3. Frankfurt Hauptbahnhof
4. Hamburg Dammtor station: documents from around the time of the opening of the station refer to Centralbahnhof. or Zentral-Bahnhof.
5. Ingolstadt Hauptbahnhof
6. Magdeburg Hauptbahnhof
7. Mainz Hauptbahnhof
8. München Hauptbahnhof until 1 May 1904.
9. Oldenburg Hauptbahnhof (called Centralbahnhof Oldenburg from 1879 to 1911)
10. Osnabrück Hauptbahnhof
11. Stuttgart Zentralbahnhof (or Centralbahnhof) was a centrally located station on the Zentralbahn (replaced by Stuttgart Hauptbahnhof, which opened on a new site east of the centre in 1922).

==== Italy ====
1. Agrigento Centrale railway station
2. Bari Centrale railway station
3. Bari Centrale railway station (FAL)
4. Barletta Centrale railway station (FNB)
5. Bologna Centrale railway station
6. Caltanissetta Centrale railway station
7. Catania Centrale railway station
8. Gorizia Centrale railway station
9. La Spezia Centrale railway station
10. Lamezia Terme Centrale railway station
11. Livorno Centrale railway station
12. Messina Centrale railway station
13. Milano Centrale railway station
14. Napoli Centrale railway station
15. Nardò Centrale railway station
16. Palermo Centrale railway station
17. Pescara Centrale railway station
18. Pisa Centrale railway station
19. Porto Empedocle Centrale railway station
20. Potenza Centrale railway station
21. Prato Centrale railway station
22. Reggio Calabria Centrale railway station
23. Tarvisio Centrale railway station - now closed
24. Torre Annunziata Centrale railway station
25. Trieste Centrale railway station
26. Treviglio railway station, also known as Treviglio Centrale
27. Treviso Centrale railway station

==== Netherlands ====
In the Netherlands, a centraal station (abbreviated CS), in its original sense, was a railway station served by several railway companies; so it had the same meaning as a union station in the USA. Since the various private railways were merged in the early 20th century into a national railway, the term came to mean, in everyday language, the main railway station of a city.

Since the 2000s, the rule is that a city's principal station may be called "Centraal" if it has more than a certain number of passengers per day (currently 40.000). This meant that Almere Centraal had to be demoted to "Almere Centrum"; however, Leiden was renamed "Leiden Centraal". Additionally, stations with international high-speed trains may be given the name Centraal; this applies to Arnhem. Breda was intended to receive the epithet after renovation in 2016, but since high speed services do not yet call there, it is still called Breda.

Non-railway signage, such as on buses or roads, sometimes indicates Centraal or CS even when a city's main railway station is not actually so named.

Eight stations have the word Centraal:

1. Amsterdam Centraal
2. Den Haag Centraal
3. Leiden Centraal
4. Rotterdam Centraal
5. Utrecht Centraal
6. Arnhem Centraal
7. Eindhoven Centraal
8. Amersfoort Centraal

There are also stations with the word Centrum, which indicates the station is in the city centre:

1. Almere Centrum
2. Barneveld Centrum
3. Ede Centrum
4. Kerkrade Centrum
5. Lelystad Centrum
6. Schiedam Centrum
7. Veenendaal Centrum
8. Vlaardingen Centrum

==== Norway ====
1. Oslo Central Station (Oslo Sentralstasjon)
2. Trondheim Central Station (Trondheim Sentralstasjon)

==== Poland ====
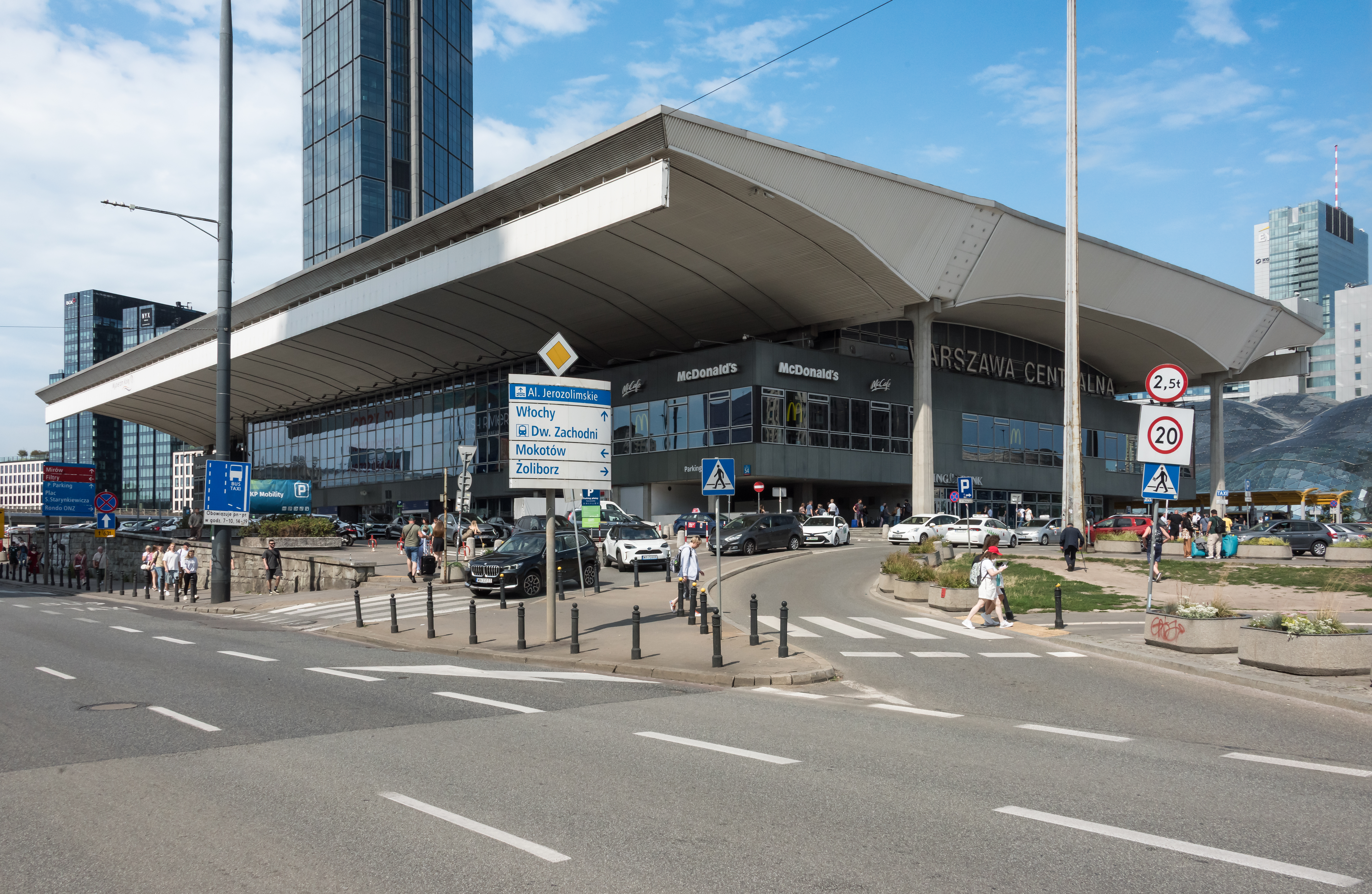
Warsaw Central Station

The designation "main station" (Dworzec główny, abbreviated to " Gł.") is used in many Polish cities to indicate the most important passenger or goods station, for instance Szczecin Główny. However, there is an exception:

Warszawa Centralna railway station is the principal station in Warsaw, but Warszawa Główna railway station (reopened in March 2021) is the terminus for several train services.

The following stations are named "main station" (dworzec główny):

1. Bielsko-Biała Główna (Bielsko-Biała)
2. Bydgoszcz Główna (Bydgoszcz)
3. Gdańsk Główny (Gdańsk)
4. Gdynia Główna (Gdynia)
5. Iława Główna (Iława)
6. Kielce Główne (Kielce), from 10 Dec 2023
7. Kłodzko Główne (Kłodzko)
8. Kraków Główny (Kraków)
9. Lublin Główny (Lublin), from 15 Dec 2019
10. Łowicz Główny (Łowicz)
11. Olsztyn Główny (Olsztyn)
12. Opole Główne (Opole)
13. Piła Główna (Piła)
14. Podkowa Leśna Główna (Podkowa Leśna)
15. Poznań Główny (Poznań)
16. Przemyśl Główny (Przemyśl)
17. Radom Główny (Radom), from 12 Dec 2021
18. Rzeszów Główny (Rzeszów), from 14 Dec 2008
19. Sosnowiec Główny (Sosnowiec)
20. Szczecin Główny (Szczecin)
21. Toruń Główny (Toruń)
22. Wałbrzych Główny (Wałbrzych)
23. Wrocław Główny (Wrocław)
24. Zielona Góra Główna (Zielona Góra), from 9 Dec 2018

The adjective "main" is thus not used only for stations in a few capitals of voivodeships, including: Białystok, Gorzów Wielkopolski, Katowice and Łódź.

==== Sweden ====
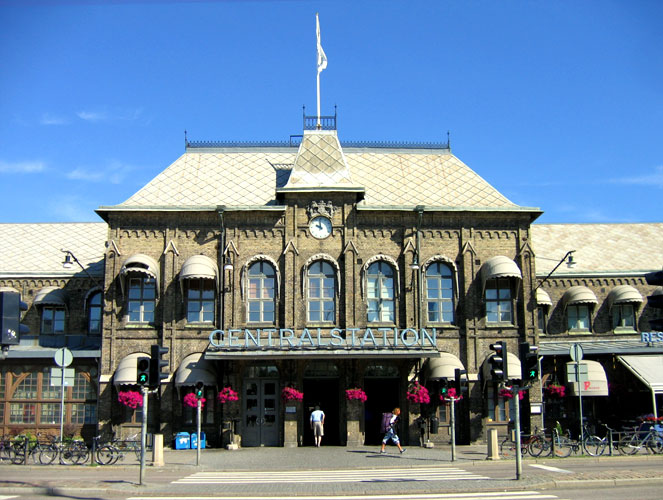
Gothenburg Central Station

In Sweden the term "central station" (Centralstation, abbreviated to Central or C) is used to indicate the primary station in towns and cities with more than one railway station. Many are termini for one or more lines. However, the term can also occur in a broader sense, even being used for the only railway station in a town. In some cases, this is because other stations have closed; but in others the station is called "central" even though there has only ever been one. In these cases, the term "central" was used to highlight the level of service provided, due to the station's importance in the network, particularly at important railway junctions.

1. Arlanda Central Station (Stockholm Arlanda Airport)
2. Gothenburg Central Station
3. Halmstad Central Station
4. Hässleholm Central Station
5. Jönköping Central Station
6. Malmö Central Station
7. Norrköping Central Station
8. Nässjö Central Station
9. Stockholm Central Station
10. Uppsala Central Station
11. Västerås Central Station
12. Lund Central Station
13. Kalmar Central Station
14. Karlskrona Central Station
15. Kristianstad Central Station
16. Linköping Central Station
17. Helsingborg Central Station
18. Södertälje Central Station
19. Örebro Central Station

==== Switzerland ====
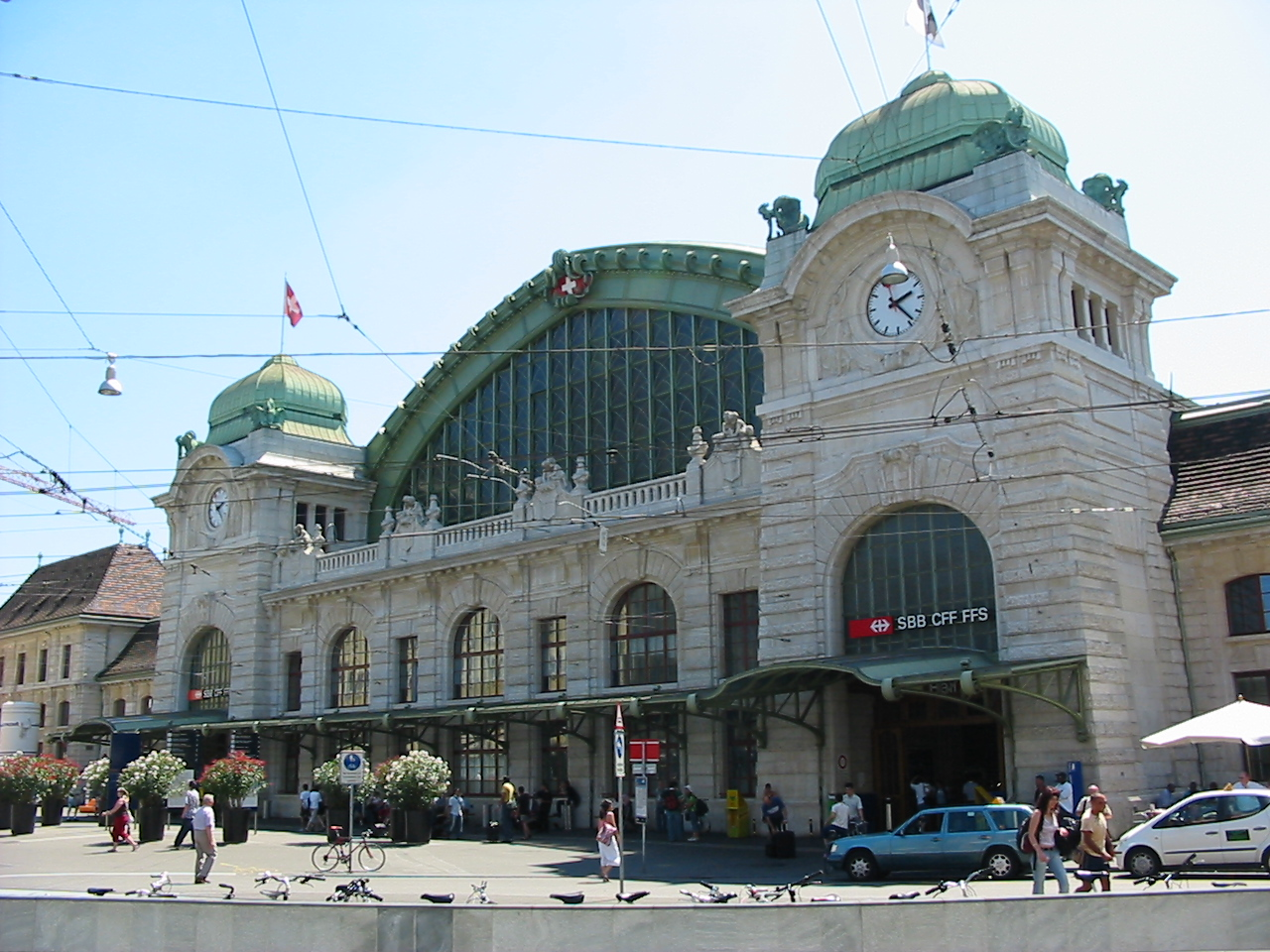
Basel Central Station

Basel SBB railway station was originally known as the Centralbahnhof or, in English, Basle Central Station and is still sometimes referred to today as the Centralbahnhof or Basel/Basle Central Station. The name of Zürich Hauptbahnhof, often shortened to Zürich HB or just HB, literally translated into English, is Zurich Main Station, but, as indicated in the Germany section above, some German sources translate Hauptbahnhof as "central station".

==== Turkey ====
1. Adana railway station
2. Ankara railway station
3. Eskişehir railway station
4. Gaziantep railway station
5. Kars railway station
6. Kayseri railway station
7. Mersin railway station

==== United Kingdom ====
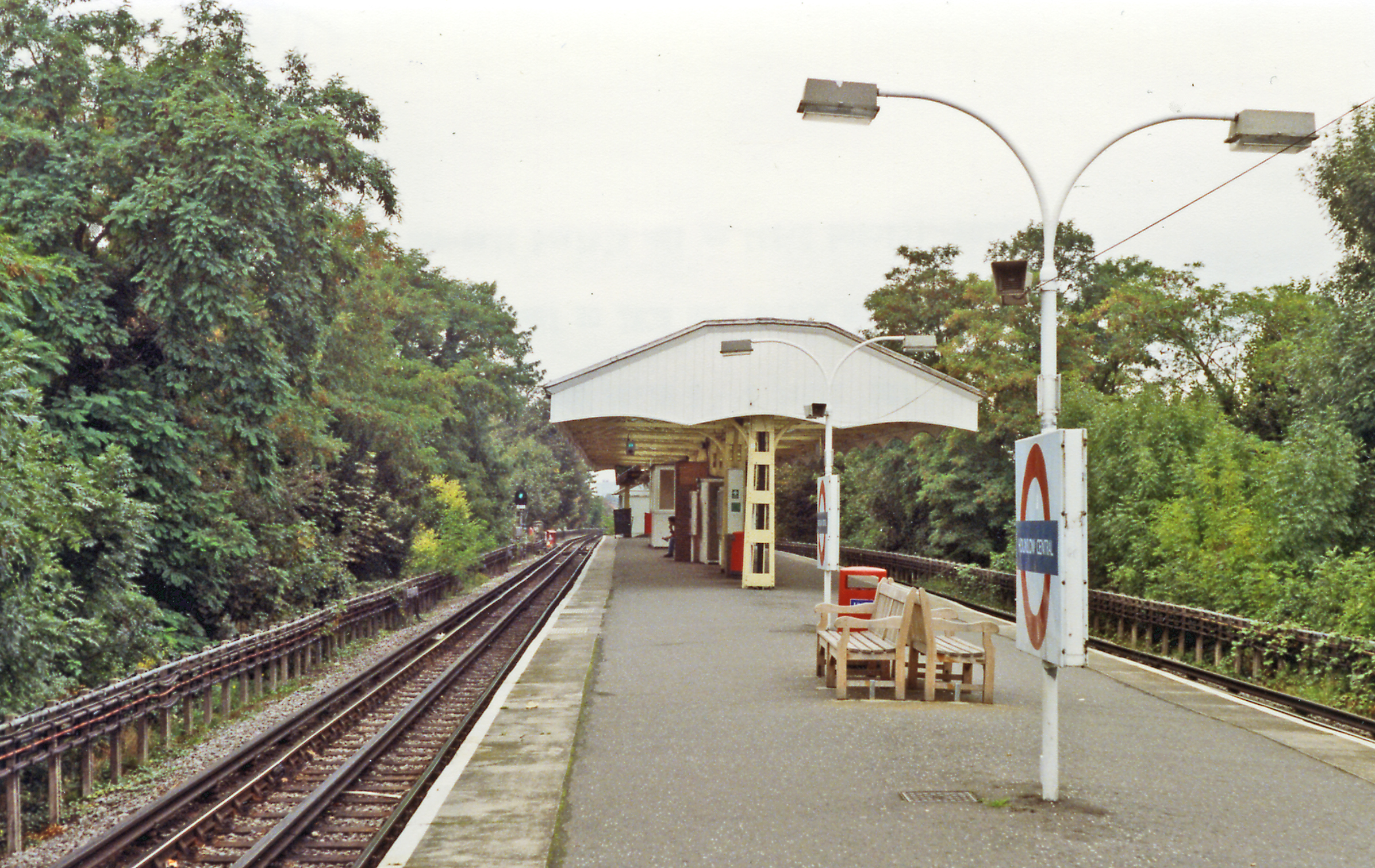
Hounslow Central station

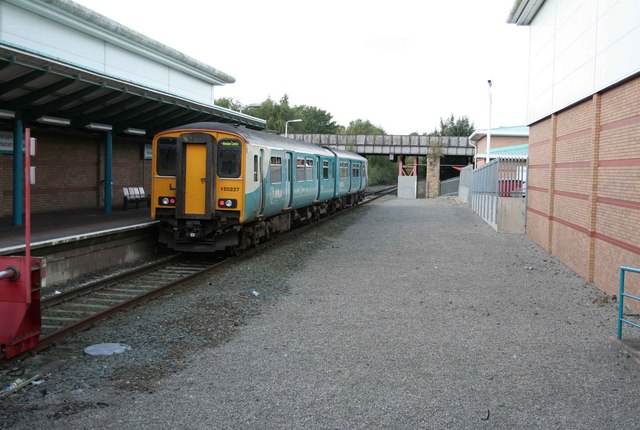
Wrexham Central station

Many railway stations in Britain that use 'Central' are not principal stations, and are called Central to distinguish them from other stations with different names, or for prestige. In some cases, a station originally owned by the Great Central Railway in locations served by more than one station was called Central. Town also appears: for example Edenbridge Town distinguishes it from Edenbridge station.

One of the few principal stations in Britain that is called 'Central' and truly is in the centre of the city it serves is Glasgow Central. Though Glasgow was once served by four principal terminus stations, all within the city centre, only one was called 'Central'. With a few exceptions such as the Argyle line, Glasgow Central serves all stations south of the city while Glasgow Queen Street is the principal station for all services north of the city. Likewise, Cardiff Central is located in the city centre and is the mainline hub of the South Wales rail network, which includes 19 other stations in Cardiff itself, including another principal city centre station, Cardiff Queen Street.

Not all the stations in the following list still exist.

1. Acton Central railway station
2. Belfast Grand Central station
3. Birkenhead Central railway station
4. Brackley Central railway station
5. Burnley Central railway station
6. Cardiff Central railway station
7. Central railway station (London)
8. Central Croydon railway station
9. Chesterfield Central railway station
10. Coatbridge Central railway station
11. Dumbarton Central railway station
12. Exeter Central railway station
13. Finchley Central tube station
14. Folkestone Central railway station
15. Gainsborough Central railway station
16. Glasgow Central railway station
17. Greenock Central railway station
18. Hackney Central railway station
19. Hamilton Central railway station
20. Helensburgh Central railway station
21. Hendon Central tube station
22. Hounslow Central tube station
23. Hyde Central railway station
24. Kirkby-in-Ashfield Central railway station
25. Leicester Central railway station
26. Lincoln Central railway station
27. Liverpool Central railway station
28. Loughborough Central railway station
29. Manchester Central railway station
30. Mansfield Central railway station
31. Milton Keynes Central railway station
32. New Mills Central railway station
33. Newcastle Central railway station and associated Central Station Metro station
34. Redcar Central railway station
35. Rotherham Central railway station
36. Rugby Central railway station
37. St Helens Central railway station
38. St Helens Central (GCR) railway station
39. Salford Central railway station
40. Scarborough Central railway station
41. Southampton Central railway station
42. Southend Central railway station
43. Staveley Central railway station
44. Sutton-in-Ashfield Central railway station
45. Telford Central railway station
46. Tuxford Central railway station
47. Walthamstow Central station
48. Warrington Central railway station
49. Wembley Central station
50. Windsor & Eton Central railway station
51. Wrexham Central railway station

=== Central America ===
==== Cuba ====
- Central Railway Station, Havana, commuter and national rail station in Havana

=== North America ===
==== Canada ====
- Central station (Edmonton), in Edmonton
- Montreal Central Station, in Montreal
- Guelph Central Station, an intermodal (rail/bus) station in Guelph

==== United States ====
In the United States, several "Central" stations were built by railways called "Central", the best known example being Grand Central Station in New York City, which is so named because it was built by the New York Central Railroad.

This contrasts with a union station, which, in the past, served more than one railway company (the equivalent term in Europe is a joint station). The government-funded Amtrak took over the operation of all intercity passenger rail in the 1970s and 1980s.

- Buffalo Central Terminal, in Buffalo, New York
- Central Station, Chicago
- Grand Central Station, Chicago
- Central (CTA Green Line), Chicago, Illinois
- Central (CTA Purple Line), Evanston, Illinois
- Central Station (JTA Skyway), Jacksonville, Florida
- Central Station (Memphis), Memphis, Tennessee
- MiamiCentral, Miami, Florida
- Grand Central Terminal, New York City
- Great Central Station, Chicago

=== South America ===
==== Argentina ====
- Estación Central in Buenos Aires, Argentina operated from 1872 to 1897.

==== Brazil ====
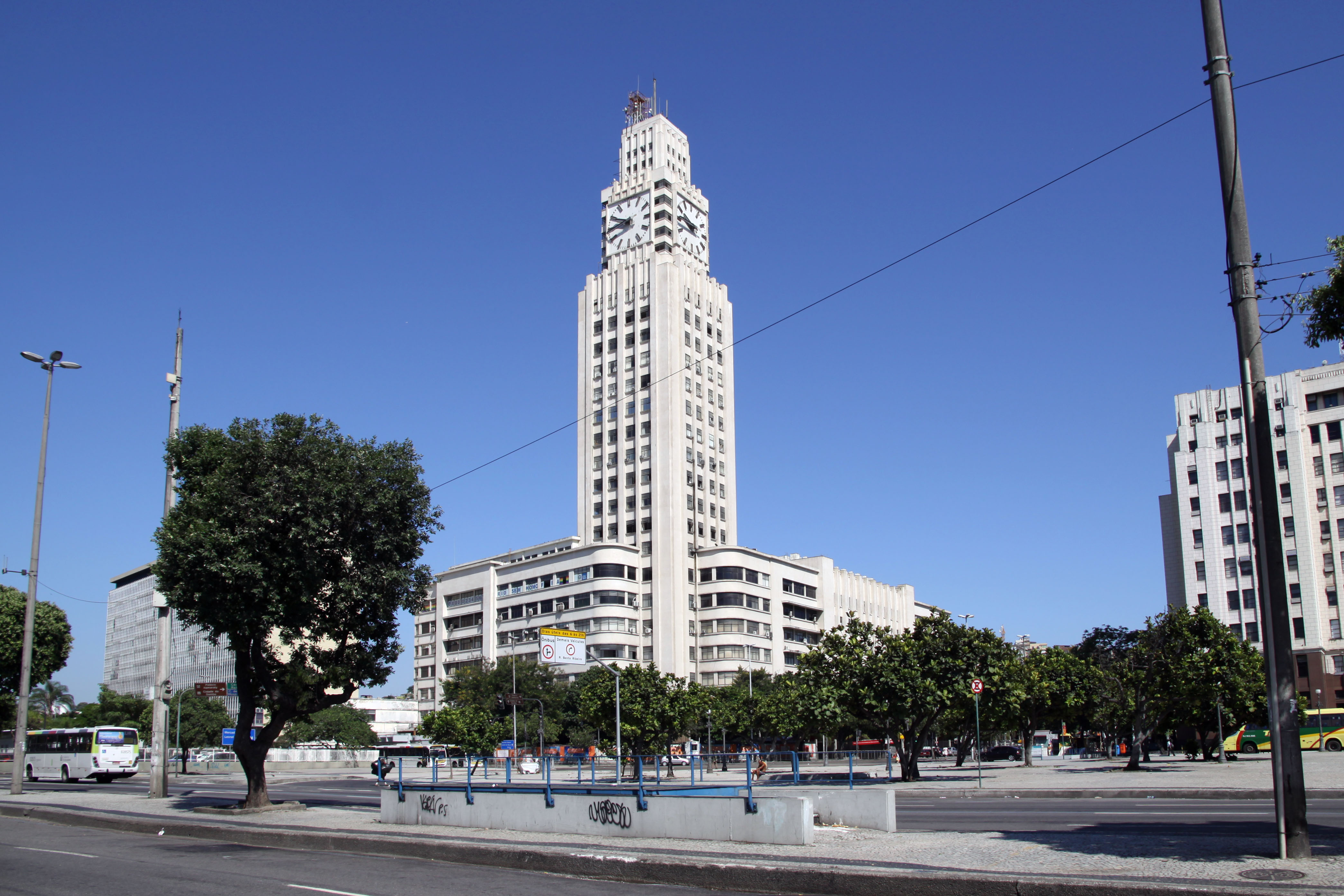
Estação Central do Brasil, in the downtown Rio de Janeiro.

In Brazil, "Central Station" is called as "Estação Central" and can be a place that integrates bus or train.

- Central do Brasil, in Rio de Janeiro
- Estação da Luz, in São Paulo
- Central station (Federal District Metro)

==== Chile ====
- Estación Alameda in Santiago, Chile is known unofficially as Estación Central

=== Asia ===
==== Azerbaijan ====
- Baku railway station
- Sumgait railway station

==== Bangladesh ====
- Kamalapur Railway Station

==== Hong Kong ====
- Central and Hong Kong stations, a main interchange station of the MTR rapid transit system (located in Central; served by the Airport Express, Island line, Tsuen Wan line and Tung Chung line.)

==== India ====
- Kanpur Central (CNB), in Kanpur, Uttar Pradesh
- Mangalore Central (MAQ) in Mangalore, Karnataka
- Mumbai Central (MMCT), in Mumbai, Maharashtra
- Trivandrum Central (TVC), in Trivandrum, Kerala
- MGR Chennai Central (MAS), in Chennai, Tamil Nadu

==== Indonesia ====
- Manggarai Central Station (MRI) in Tebet, South Jakarta

==== Israel ====
- Be'er Sheva Center railway station, Be'er Sheva
- Haifa Center HaShmona railway station, Haifa
- Modi'in Central railway station, Modi'in
- Tel Aviv Savidor Central railway station, Tel Aviv
- Jerusalem–Yitzhak Navon railway station, Jerusalem

==== Japan ====
- Kagoshima-Chūō Station in Kagoshima, formerly Nishi-Kagoshima Station

==== Malaysia ====
Sentral is the Malay spelling for the English word central.

- Kuala Lumpur Sentral station, in Kuala Lumpur
- Penang Sentral station in Butterworth, Penang
- Johor Bahru Sentral station, in Johor Bahru

==== South Korea ====
In South Korea, major railway stations of the city don't usually have additional names besides the name of the respective city, like these examples below.

- Seoul Station in Seoul
- Busan Station in Busan

However, some stations do have a term 중앙(Jungang)(literally. Central) in their names to differentiate the original station. These stations are usually located in closer locations to the city centre.

- Changwon Jungang station in Changwon
- Dongducheon Jungang station in Dongducheon
- Samseong Jungang station in Samseong-dong, Seoul
- Jung-ang station (Uijeongbu) in Uijeongbu

Also, there are Jungang metro stations which are named after the neighborhood name, Jungang-dong.

- Jungang station (Ansan)
- Jungang station (Busan Metro)

==== Taiwan ====
- Taipei Main Station in Taipei City
- Taichung railway station in Taichung City
- Kaohsiung Main Station in Kaohsiung City

==== Thailand ====
- Krung Thep Aphiwat Central Terminal, also known as Bang Sue Grand Station, is the current central station of Bangkok, Thailand
  - Hua Lamphong railway station is the former central station of Bangkok until 19 January 2023
- Hat Yai Junction railway station is the central station of Hat Yai
- Chachoengsao Junction railway station is the central station of Chachoengsao

=== Africa ===
==== South Africa ====
- Cape Town railway station, Cape Town
- Bloemfontein railway station, Bloemfontein
- Durban railway station, Durban
- Johannesburg Park station, Johannesburg
- Kimberley railway station, Kimberley
- Mafikeng railway station, Rustenburg
- Pietermaritzburg railway station, Pietermaritzburg
- Pretoria railway station, Pretoria

=== Oceania ===
==== Australia ====
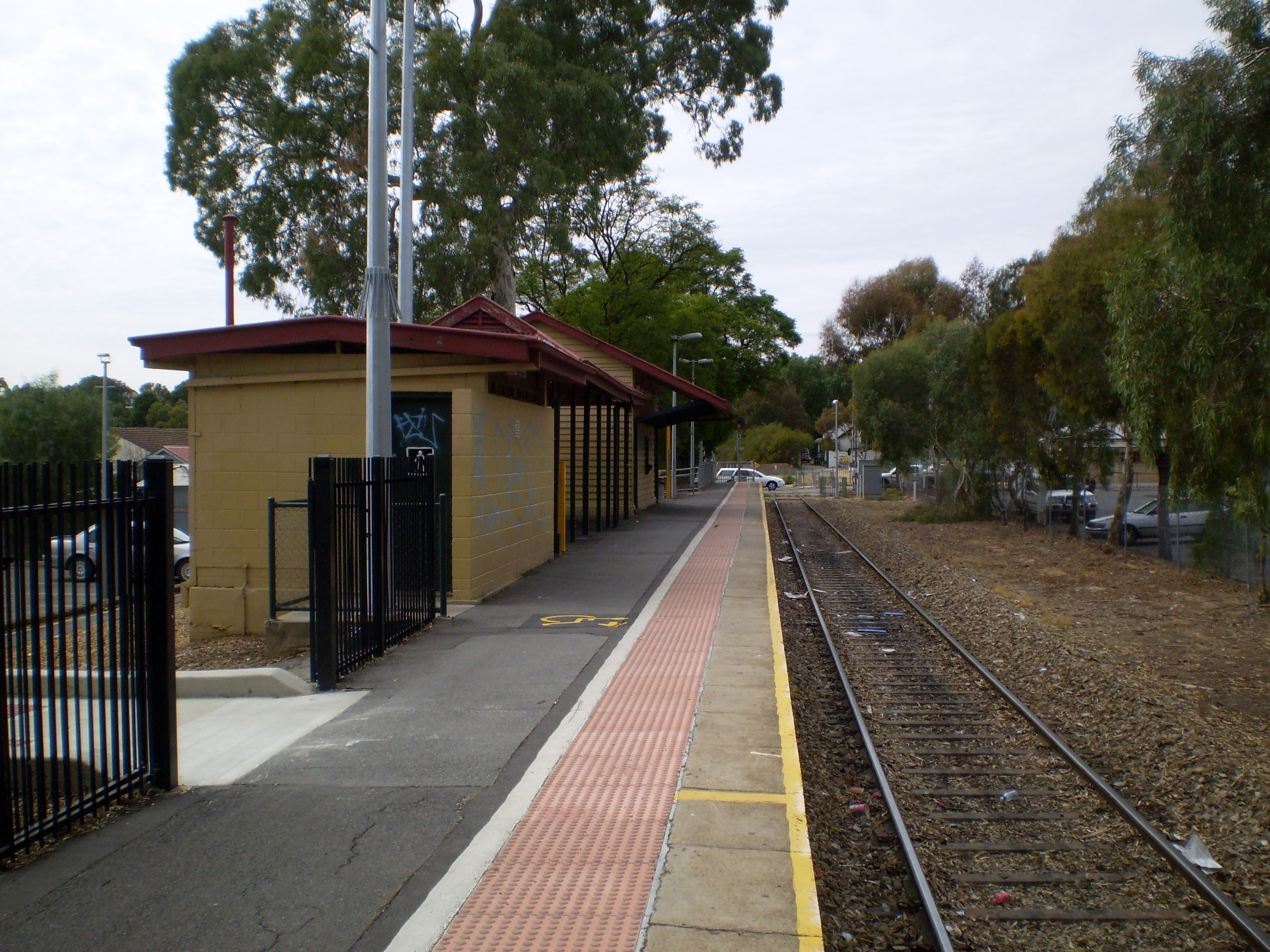
Gawler Central railway station, Adelaide

- Central railway station, Brisbane
- Melbourne Central railway station, named after Melbourne Central Shopping Centre, Melbourne
- Central railway station, Sydney, also known as Sydney Terminal, Sydney
- Gawler Central railway station, Adelaide
- Wynnum Central railway station, Brisbane
- Cockburn Central railway station, Perth
