= Kimberley railway station (South Africa) =

Railway station in South Africa

Kimberley
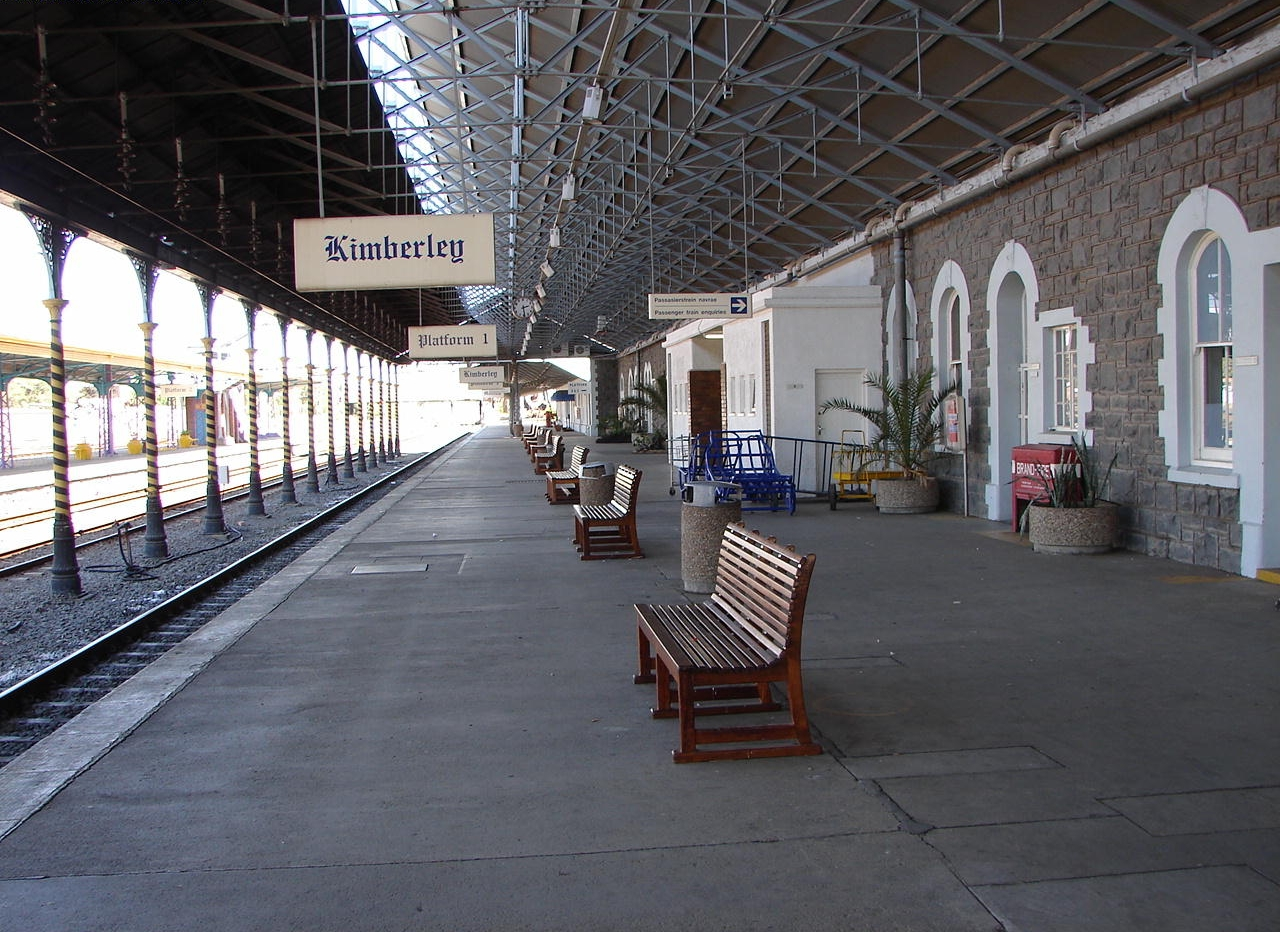
- Kimberley station platform

General information
- Location: Florence Street, Kimberley 8301
- Coordinates: 28°44′7″S 24°46′11″E
- System: Railway station
- Owner: TFR
- Line: Shosholoza Meyl: Johannesburg–Cape Town Cape Town–Durban Johannesburg–Kimberley–Bloemfontein Premier Classe: Johannesburg–Cape Town
- Platforms: 1 side, 1 island
- Tracks: 3

Construction
- Structure type: At-grade
Location

Kimberley railway station is the central railway station of the city of Kimberley, in the Northern Cape province of South Africa. Because Kimberley is the junction of the main Cape Town–Johannesburg main line with another line from Bloemfontein, it is served by several routes of the Shosholoza Meyl inter-city service. Kimberley railway station is also used by the luxury tourist-oriented Blue Train and the private train holiday company Rovos Rail.

| Preceding station | Shosholoza Meyl | Following station |
|---|---|---|
| Warrenton towards Johannesburg | Johannesburg–Kimberley–Bloemfontein | Bloemfontein Terminus |
| Warrenton towards Johannesburg | Johannesburg–Cape Town Tourist class trains | De Aar towards Cape Town |
| Warrenton towards Johannesburg | Johannesburg–Cape Town Economy class trains | Oranjerivier towards Cape Town |
| De Aar towards Cape Town | Cape Town–Durban Tourist class trains | Bloemfontein towards Durban |
| Oranjerivier towards Cape Town | Cape Town–Durban Economy class trains | Bloemfontein towards Durban |
| Preceding station | Premier Classe | Following station |
| Klerksdorp towards Johannesburg | Johannesburg–Cape Town | De Aar towards Cape Town |
