= East London railway station =

Railway station in South Africa

East London
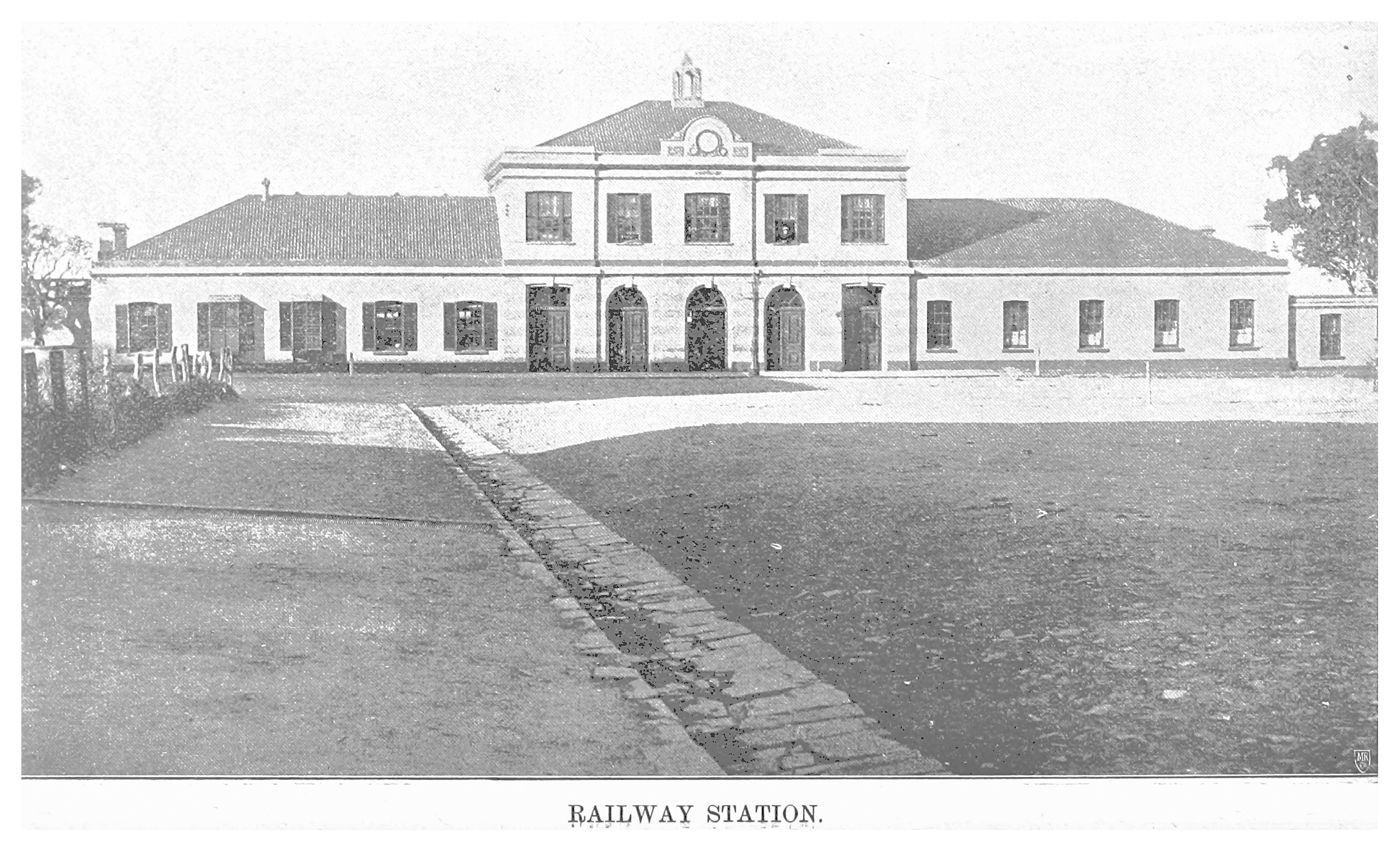
- (1893)

General information
- Location: Station Street, East London 5201
- Coordinates: 33°1′0″S 27°54′26″E
- System: Railway station
- Owner: TFR
- Line: Shosholoza Meyl: Johannesburg–East London Cape Town–East London Metrorail: East London Metrorail
- Platforms: 5 terminus platforms
- Tracks: 5

Construction
- Structure type: At-grade

History
- Opened: 1880
Location

East London railway station is the central railway station in the city of East London in the Eastern Cape province of South Africa. It is the terminus for Shosholoza Meyl inter-city trains to Johannesburg and Cape Town, and of a Metrorail commuter service to Mdantsane and Berlin.

East London station is located along Station Road on the edge of the city's central business district. It is laid out as a terminal station, with five tracks for passenger trains.

Preceding station	Metrorail	Following station
Southernwood towards Berlin	East London Metrorail	Terminus
Preceding station	Shosholoza Meyl	Following station
Berlin, E-Cape towards Johannesburg	Johannesburg–East London	Terminus
Berlin, E-Cape towards Cape Town	Cape Town–East London	Terminus
