= Free State Stadium =

Stadium in South Africa

Toyota Stadium
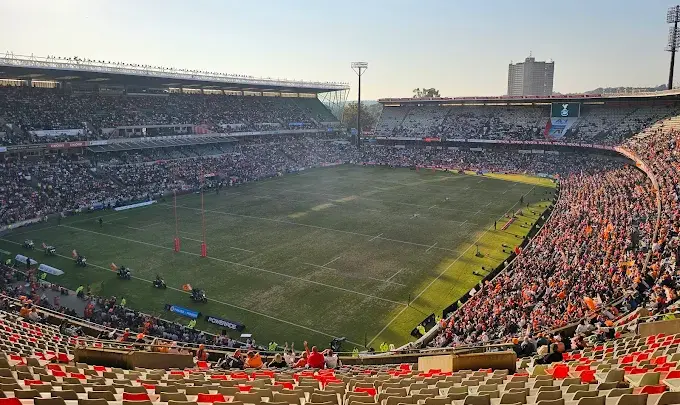
- Interactive map of Toyota Stadium
- Full name: Toyota Stadium
- Former names: Vodacom Park
- Location: Kings Way, Bloemfontein, South Africa
- Coordinates: 29°7′2″S 26°12′32″E
- Operator: Mangaung Metropolitan Municipality
- Capacity: 42,000
- Executive suites: 100
- Surface: Ryegrass
- Scoreboard: yes
- Field size: 100 by 70 metres (330 ft × 230 ft)
- Public transit: Bloemfontein railway station

Construction
- Built: 1955
- Renovated: 1995
- Expanded: 2009

Tenants
- Rugby union Free State Cheetahs; Cheetahs (1997–present)

The Free State Stadium (Afrikaans: Vrystaatstadion), currently known as the Toyota Stadium for sponsorship reasons and formerly known as Vodacom Park, is a stadium in Bloemfontein in the Free State of South Africa, used mainly for rugby union and also sometimes for association football. It was originally built for the 1995 Rugby World Cup, and was one of the venues for the 2010 FIFA World Cup.

The primary rugby union tenants of the facility are the Free State Cheetahs, which participate in South Africa's domestic competition, the Currie Cup. Previously, the Cheetahs represented the Free State and Northern Cape provinces in the international Pro14 competition.

Until their sale before the start of the 2021–22 South African Premiership, the primary association football tenant was Bloemfontein Celtic, who played in South Africa's domestic South African Premiership.

== Upgrade ==
In 2025, the stadium was downgraded to Class C status, meaning it was no longer eligible to host international rugby matches. An upgrade was completed in February 2026, restoring it to Class B, and once again eligible to host international matches.

== Notable matches ==
=== 1995 Rugby World Cup ===
The stadium was one of the host venues for the 1995 Rugby World Cup. It hosted first-round matches in Pool C during the tournament.

Date	Team #1	Res.	Team #2	Round	Attendance
27 May 1995	Japan	10–57	Wales	Group C	12,000
31 May 1995	Ireland	50–28	Japan	Group C	15,000
4 June 1995^{1}	Japan	17–145	New Zealand	Group C	17,000

=== 1996 African Cup of Nations ===
The Free State Stadium was one of venues used for the 1996 African Cup of Nations. It hosted six group matches and a quarter-final match:

Date	Time (SAST)	Team #1	Result	Team #2	Round	Attendance
14 January 1996		Zambia	0–0	Algeria	Group B	9,000
15 January 1996		Sierra Leone	2–1	Burkina Faso	Group B	1,500
18 January 1996		Algeria	2–0	Sierra Leone	Group B	1,500
20 January 1996		Zambia	5–1	Burkina Faso	Group B	2,000
24 January 1996		Zambia	4–0	Sierra Leone	Group B	200
25 January 1996		Ghana	2–0	Mozambique	Group D	3,500
27 January 1996		Zambia	3–1	Egypt	Quarter-finals	8,500

=== 2009 FIFA Confederations Cup ===
The Free State Stadium was one of the host venues for the 2009 FIFA Confederations Cup.

Date	Time (SAST)	Team #1	Result	Team #2	Round	Attendance
15 June 2009	16:00	Brazil	4–3	Egypt	Group B	27,851
17 June 2009	16:00	Spain	1–0	Iraq	Group A	30,512
20 June 2009	20:30	Spain	2–0	South Africa	Group A	38,212
24 June 2009	20:30	Spain	0–2	United States	Semi-finals	35,369

=== 2010 FIFA World Cup ===
Ahead of the 2010 FIFA World Cup, a second tier was added to the main grandstand on the western side of the ground, increasing the net capacity from 36,538 to 40,911. Additionally, new turnstiles were created, the floodlights upgraded, electronic scoreboards installed, the sound system revamped to the required standards, and CCTV and media facilities improved.

Bloemfontein received R221 million to upgrade the stadium. Though cost estimates were at R245 million, the city decided to stand in for the R24m shortfall. Tenders were advertised in February and March 2007. Upgrade work started in July 2007.

Date	Time (SAST)	Team #1	Result	Team #2	Round	Attendance
14 June 2010	16.00	Japan	1–0	Cameroon	Group E	30,620
17 June 2010	16.00	Greece	2–1	Nigeria	Group B	31,593
20 June 2010	13.30	Slovakia	0–2	Paraguay	Group F	26,643
22 June 2010	16.00	France	1–2	South Africa	Group A	39,415
25 June 2010	20.30	Switzerland	0–0	Honduras	Group H	28,042
27 June 2010	16.00	Germany	4–1	England	Round of 16	40,510

== See also ==
- List of stadiums in South Africa
- List of African stadiums by capacity
