= Metrorail Eastern Cape =

Metrorail Eastern Cape Region

Overview
- Owner: PRASA
- Transit type: Commuter rail
- Number of lines: 2
- Annual ridership: 400,000 (2023)
- Website: www.metrorail.co.za

Operation
- Operator: Metrorail

Technical
- Track gauge: 1,067 mm (3 ft 6 in)

Metrorail Eastern Cape is the name given to the commuter rail services operated by Metrorail, a division of the Passenger Rail Agency of South Africa, in the Eastern Cape province of South Africa. There are two lines, one connecting Port Elizabeth, Despatch and Uitenhage, and the other connecting East London, Mdantsane and Berlin.

Unlike the other Metrorail regions, which use electric multiple units, the Eastern Cape services are provided by sets of ten coaches pulled by diesel locomotives.

== Lines ==
The Uitenhage CBD Line (also known as Port Elizabeth Line) starts at Port Elizabeth railway station in central Port Elizabeth, and runs northwards along the main Port Elizabeth–Bloemfontein line as far as Swartkops, where it branches west through Despatch to Uitenhage. PRASA is planning to construct a branch serving Motherwell and the Coega Industrial Development Zone.

The Berlin Line (also known as East London Line) starts at East London railway station and runs along the main East London–Bloemfontein railway line through Mdantsane to end in Berlin.
