= Pietermaritzburg railway station =

Railway station in South Africa

Pietermaritzburg
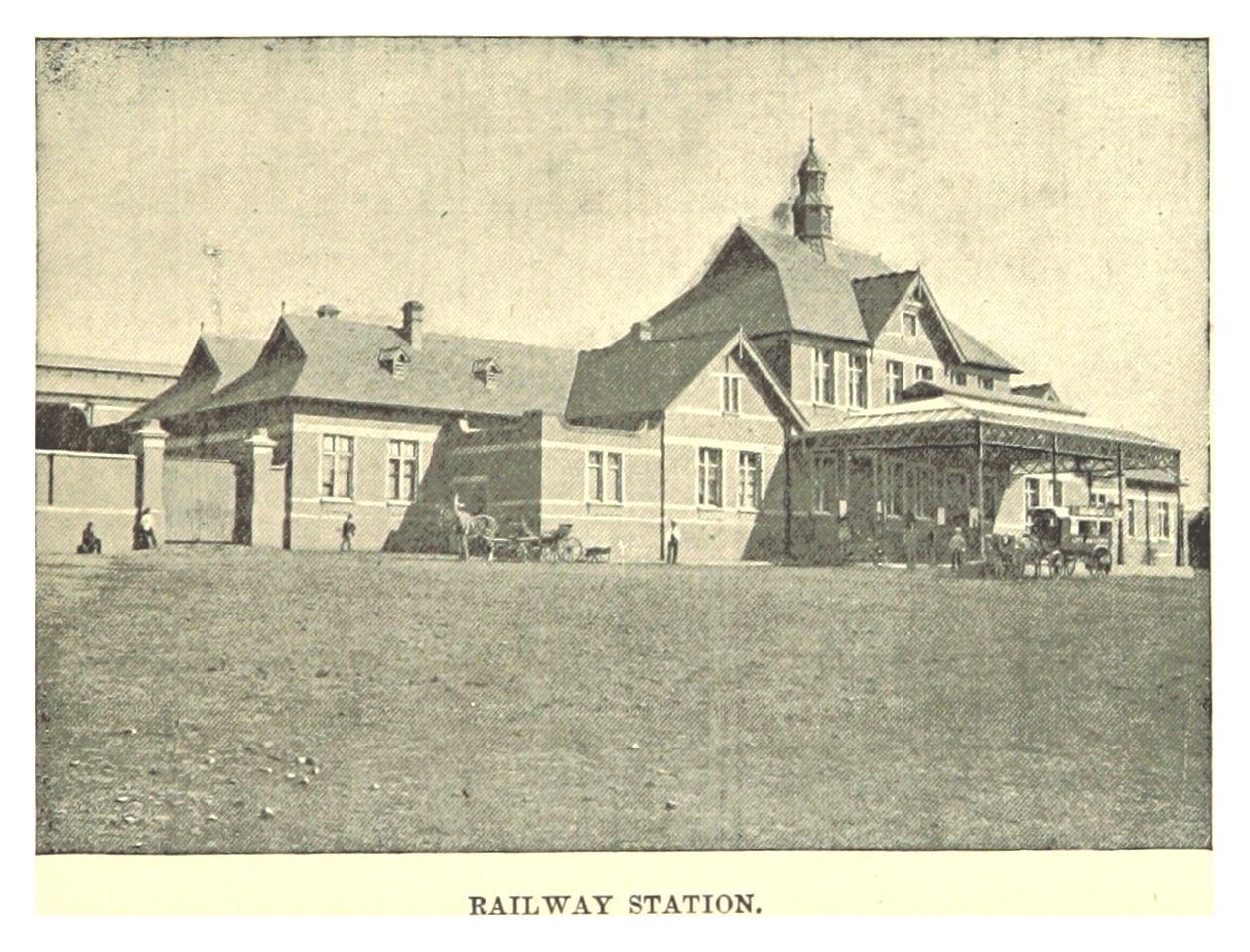

General information
- Location: 23 Rail Street, Pietermaritzburg, 3201
- Coordinates: 29°36′35″S 30°22′5″E
- System: Railway Station
- Owner: PRASA
- Line: Shosholoza Meyl: Johannesburg–Durban Cape Town–Durban Premier Classe: Johannesburg–Durban

Construction
- Structure type: At-grade Red Brick Victorian
Location

Pietermaritzburg Railway Station is the main railway station serving the city of Pietermaritzburg (/ˌpiːtərˈmærɪtsbɜːrɡ/), South Africa. It is located on Railway and Pine Streets in the South Western corner of the city centre.

Historically, the station is famous as being the place where Mahatma Gandhi was thrown off a train for riding first class in 1893. The station is also a stop on the erratically run long-distance passenger rail service, operated by Shosholoza Meyl.

Preceding station	Shosholoza Meyl	Following station
Ladysmith towards Johannesburg	Johannesburg–Durban	Durban Terminus
Ladysmith towards Cape Town	Cape Town–Durban	Durban Terminus
Preceding station	Premier Classe	Following station
Ladysmith towards Johannesburg	Johannesburg–Durban	Durban Terminus
