= Kroonstad railway station =

Railway station in South Africa

Kroonstad Station

General information
- Location: Stasie Street, Charl Malanville, Kroonstad, 9501
- Coordinates: 27.6596°S 27.2339°E
- Operated by: TFR
- Line: Johannesburg–East London Johannesburg–Cape Town Cape Town–Durban Johannesburg–Port Elizabeth
- Platforms: 1 side platform, 2 islands
- Tracks: 6

Construction
- Structure type: at grade
Location

Kroonstad railway station is the railway station in the city of Kroonstad in the Free State province of South Africa.
