= Mafikeng railway station =

Railway station in South Africa

Mahikeng Railway Station

General information
- Location: Station Road, Mahikeng
- Coordinates: 25°52′05″S 25°38′33″E
- Owner: Transnet

History
- Opened: 1885
Location

Mahikeng Railway Station is the central railway station in the city of Mahikeng, South Africa and is among the oldest railway stations on the African continent. It is situated on Station Road, Mahikeng Town.

A steel cover was put on in 1913 over the railway bridge on the Vryburg Road.
