= De Aar =

Town in Northern Cape, South Africa

- Town
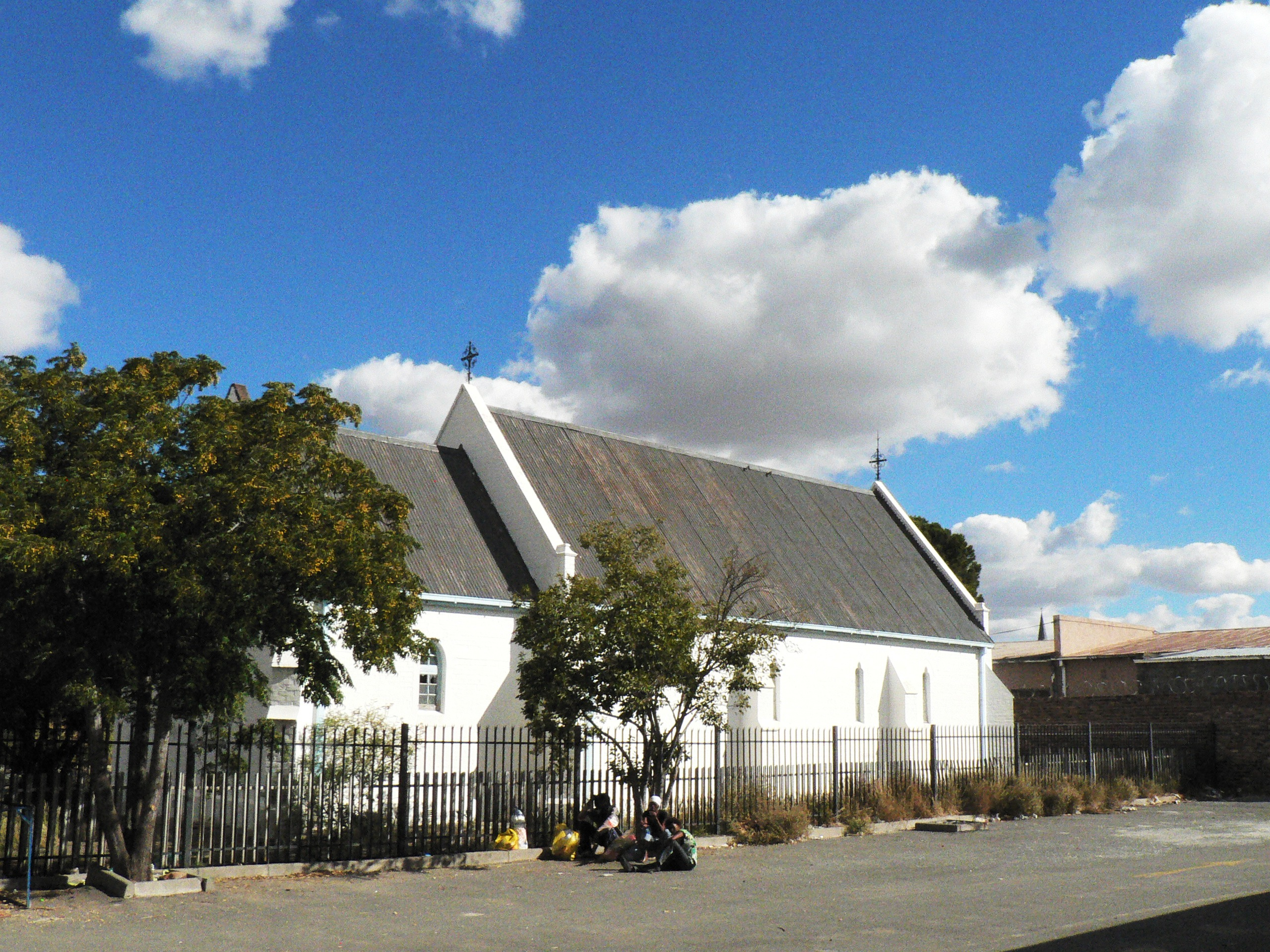
- St. Pauls Church, De Aar

- Location within Northern Cape Location within South Africa Location within Africa
- Coordinates: 30°39′00″S 24°01′00″E
- Country: South Africa
- Province: Northern Cape
- District: Pixley ka Seme
- Municipality: Emthanjeni
- Established: 1902

Area
  - Total: 84.2 km^{2} (32.5 sq mi)
- Elevation: 1,286 m (4,219 ft)

Population (2011)
  - Total: 23,760
  - Density: 282/km^{2} (731/sq mi)

Racial makeup (2011)
  - Coloured: 71.7%
  - Black African: 16.5%
  - White: 10.4%
  - Indian/Asian: 0.7%
  - Other: 0.7%

First languages (2011)
  - Afrikaans: 85.9%
  - Xhosa: 8.8%
  - English: 2.4%
  - Other: 3.3%
- Time zone: UTC+2 (SAST)
- Postal code (street): 7000
- PO box: 7000
- Area code: 053

De Aar is a town in the Northern Cape province of South Africa. It has a population of around 42,000 inhabitants.

It is the second-most important railway junction in the country, situated on the line between Cape Town and Kimberley. The junction was of particular strategic importance to the British during the Second Boer War. De Aar is also a primary commercial distribution centre for a large area of the central Great Karoo. Major production activities of the area include wool production and livestock farming. The area is also popular for hunting, although the region is rather arid. De Aar is also affectionately known as "Die SES" deriving its nickname from the six farms that have surrounded De Aar since the 1900s.

== History ==
De Aar was originally established on the Farm "De Aar." The name means "the artery", a reference to its underground water supply. The Cape Government Railways were founded in 1872, and the route that the government chose for the line to connect the Kimberley diamond fields to Cape Town on the coast, ran directly through De Aar. Because of its central location, the government also selected the location for a junction between this first railway line, and the other Cape railway networks further east, in 1881. In 1899 two brothers who ran a trading store and hotel at the junction, Isaac and Wulf Friedlander, purchased the farm of De Aar. Following the Anglo Boer War, the Friedlander brothers surveyed the land for the establishment of a town. The municipality was created a year later and the town's first mayor, Dr Harry Baker, was elected in 1907.

The South African Defence Force's 97 Ammunition Depot is located 7 kilometres (4.3 mi) outside of De Aar. This is a large facility, and includes 186 magazines and an internal railway system. The South African Army's School of Ammunition is also located at the facility.

== Geography ==
=== Climate ===
De Aar has a semi-arid climate (Köppen: BSk) with hot summers and cool winters. Diurnal air temperature variation is high throughout the year, resulting in cool summer nights and frosty winter nights. The average annual precipitation is 196 mm (8 in), with most rainfall occurring during summer and autumn.

Climate data for De Aar, elevation 1,286 m (4,219 ft), (1991–2020 normals, extremes 1999–2023)
Month	Jan	Feb	Mar	Apr	May	Jun	Jul	Aug	Sep	Oct	Nov	Dec	Year
Record high °C (°F)	42.8 (109.0)	37.9 (100.2)	37.1 (98.8)	33.6 (92.5)	29.9 (85.8)	24.9 (76.8)	26.0 (78.8)	29.8 (85.6)	35.0 (95.0)	37.7 (99.9)	39.2 (102.6)	40.0 (104.0)	42.8 (109.0)
Mean daily maximum °C (°F)	32.2 (90.0)	31.4 (88.5)	29.0 (84.2)	24.1 (75.4)	20.4 (68.7)	16.8 (62.2)	17.0 (62.6)	19.5 (67.1)	23.7 (74.7)	26.8 (80.2)	29.0 (84.2)	31.4 (88.5)	25.0 (77.0)
Daily mean °C (°F)	24.3 (75.7)	23.8 (74.8)	21.6 (70.9)	17.2 (63.0)	13.5 (56.3)	9.9 (49.8)	9.7 (49.5)	11.8 (53.2)	15.5 (59.9)	18.6 (65.5)	20.8 (69.4)	23.2 (73.8)	17.5 (63.5)
Mean daily minimum °C (°F)	16.4 (61.5)	16.3 (61.3)	14.2 (57.6)	10.2 (50.4)	6.6 (43.9)	3.0 (37.4)	2.5 (36.5)	4.1 (39.4)	7.3 (45.1)	10.5 (50.9)	12.6 (54.7)	15.1 (59.2)	9.9 (49.8)
Record low °C (°F)	6.1 (43.0)	6.1 (43.0)	3.8 (38.8)	−0.9 (30.4)	−3.7 (25.3)	−5.9 (21.4)	−6.8 (19.8)	−6.3 (20.7)	−3.4 (25.9)	0.2 (32.4)	2.4 (36.3)	6.9 (44.4)	−6.8 (19.8)
Average precipitation mm (inches)	45.6 (1.80)	49.6 (1.95)	48.9 (1.93)	31.6 (1.24)	18.7 (0.74)	13.2 (0.52)	7.1 (0.28)	9.4 (0.37)	11.1 (0.44)	22.8 (0.90)	26.8 (1.06)	37.4 (1.47)	322.5 (12.70)
Average precipitation days (≥ 1.0 mm)	5.5	5.2	5.6	4.1	2.7	1.9	1.3	1.2	1.2	2.7	3.2	4.2	38.8
Mean monthly sunshine hours	338.6	295.3	298.0	272.4	268.7	253.7	272.5	294.5	293.7	323.5	331.6	353.4	3,573.5
Source 1: NOAA
Source 2: Starlings Roost Weather (extremes)

== Tourist attractions ==
There are ancient Khoisan rock engravings on the Volksrust and Brandfontein farms. Additionally, there is a "Garden of Remembrance", which honours the British troops killed in the Anglo-Boer War. The town is also home to a major military ammunition dump. The DoD Ammunition Sub Depot De Aar is located about 2 km west of the town. De Aar is famous amongst Paragliding & Hang-Gliding pilots worldwide as it holds 2 World records & some countries' National Distance records. De Aar was also the host to the XC World Series in 2008 and 2009. During the summer months De Aar is home for several thousand Kestrels. Every evening the birds fill the sky above town and land in the big trees near the hospital just as the sun sets to spend the night.

- Doornkloof Nature Reserve
- Karoo Gariep Conservancy
- Rolfontein Nature Reserve

== Famous people ==
- Annie Nonzwakazi Albanie, a woman of the people. The major rural township where black people were displaced to during apartheid, and most still reside, was named after her. She lived in Street 18, and was married to George Albanie - formerly George Mbane - whose name was also changed during apartheid in order to benefit from preferential rights afforded to people of mixed race, over those of black Africans, but still inferior to whites.
- Olive Schreiner, author, lived in De Aar for a while, although her house has now been converted into a restaurant.
- Clerans Olifant, Narysec participant from Department of Rural Development and Land Reform
- Gerrit Badenhorst, Former Powerlifter, Professional Strongman, and South Africa's Strongest Man winner.

== Coats of arms ==
=== Municipal (1) ===
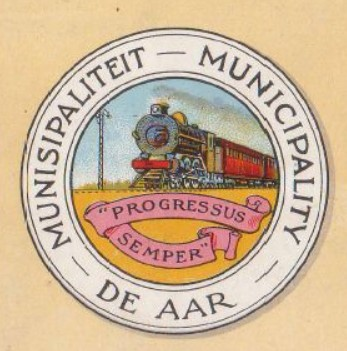
De Aar Coat of Arms

By 1931, the De Aar municipal council had adopted a seal-like emblem depicting a railway locomotive and the motto Progressus semper surrounded by a circle inscribed "Munisipaliteit – Municipality – De Aar".

=== Municipal (2) ===
By 1952, the municipality had assumed a coat of arms depicting a railway locomotive above a ram's head. The motto was on a riband below the shield.

=== Municipal (3) ===
This design was improved a few years later, and the new version was registered with the Cape Provincial Administration in November 1955. The arms were now : Or, a merino ram's head caboshed proper, a base barry wavy of four Azure and Argent; on a chief Argent a locomotive Sable (i.e. a golden shield displaying, from top to bottom, a black locomotive on a silver background, a ram's head on a golden background, and four wavy stripes alternately blue and silver).

=== Municipal (4) ===
An entirely new coat of arms was registered at the Bureau of Heraldry in March 1986. The arms were : Azure, a pale Argent; on a Chief Gules, a ram's head caboshed Argent, between two wheels Or (i.e. a blue shield with a silver stripe down the middle and, across the top, a red stripe displaying a ram's head between two golden wheels). The crest was an heraldic fountain above a water bouget, and the motto was Semper progressus.

== Gallery ==
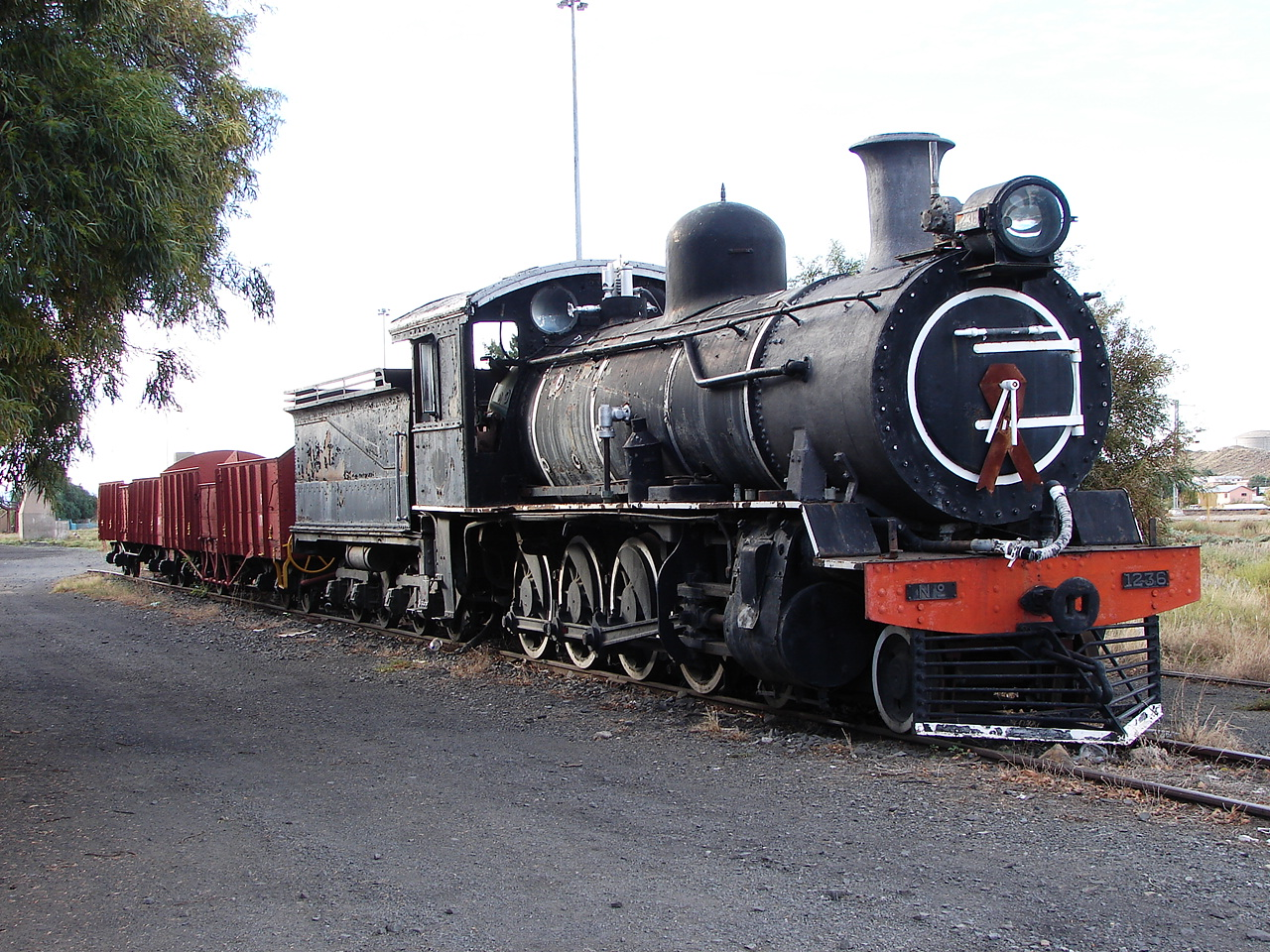
SAR Class 8FW no. 1236 plinthed at De Aar

== See also ==
- The South African Wine Initiative
- De Aar railway station
