= Västerås central station =

Railway station in Västerås, Sweden

Västerås C
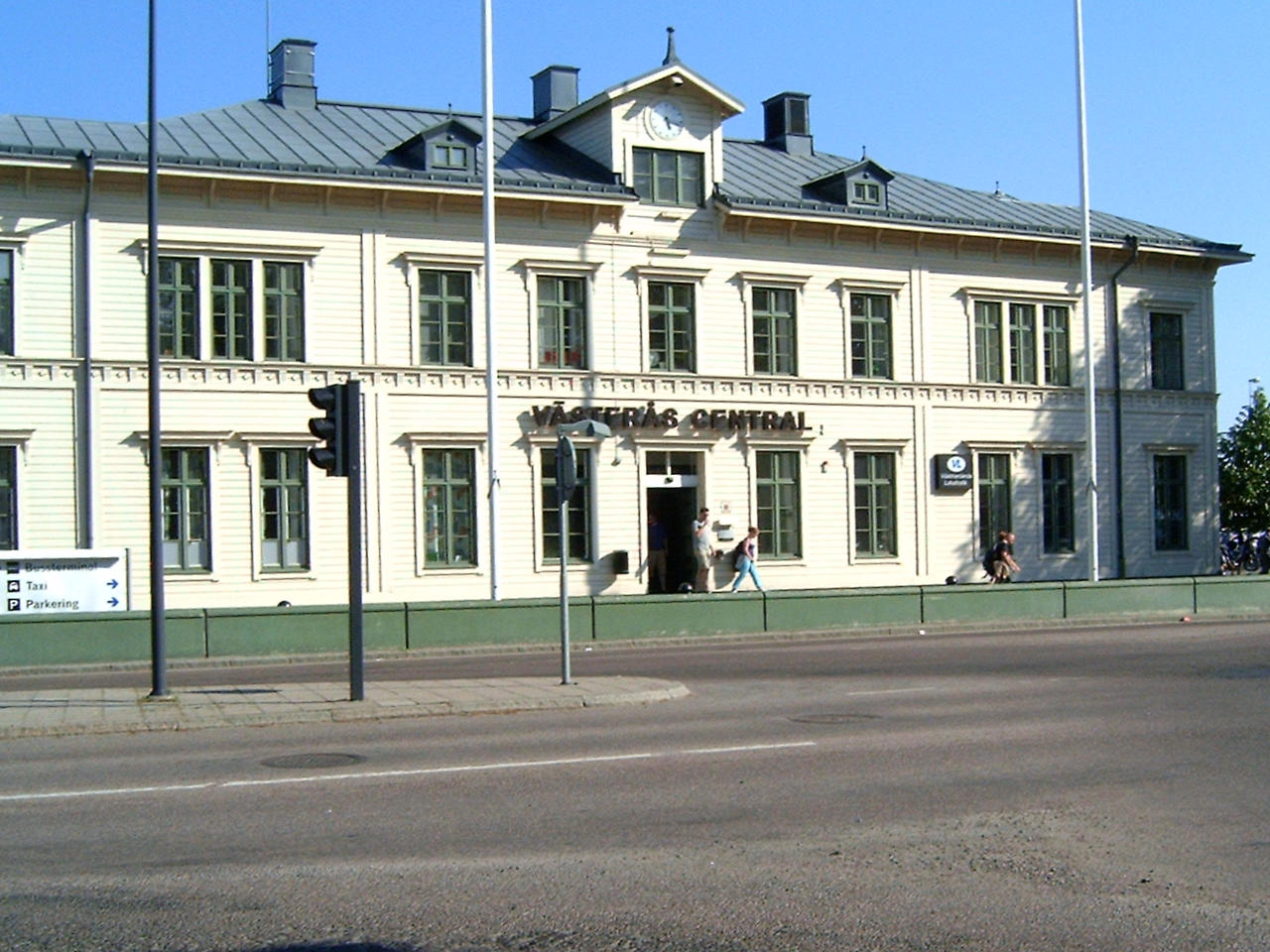

General information
- Location: Södra Ringvägen 1; 722 12 Västerås; Sweden
- Coordinates: 59°36′26″N 16°33′7″E
- Owner: Västerås Central AB (station infrastructure); Trafikverket (rail infrastructure)
- Operator: SJ
- Line: Stockholm-Örebro/Frövi
- Platforms: 3
- Tracks: 5

History
- Opened: 1875; 151 years ago

Services
Preceding station	SJ	Following station
Enköping towards Stockholm C	Mälaren Line and Western Main Line	Köping towards Göteborg C via Örebro C
Preceding station	Regional trains	Following station
Kolbäck towards Linköping C	Mälartåg	Ransta towards Uppsala C
Dingtuna towards Ludvika	Tåg i Bergslagen	Terminus
Location

Västerås central station (Swedish: Västerås resecentrum or Västerås centralstation) is a railway station in Västerås, Sweden on the Mälarbanan railway. It was originally designed by Statens Järnvägars Arkitektkontor under the leadership of Adolf W. Edelsvärd. The moving and extension of the station and the addition of a new bridge was designed by architects SAR Lars Westerberg and Charlie Gullström at Gullstöm Westerberg Arkitektkontor AB in collaboration with architect SAR Laszlo Marko.

The owner of the station is Västerås Central AB, which is jointly owned by Jernhusen AB (51%) and Västerås stad (49%).

== Gallery ==
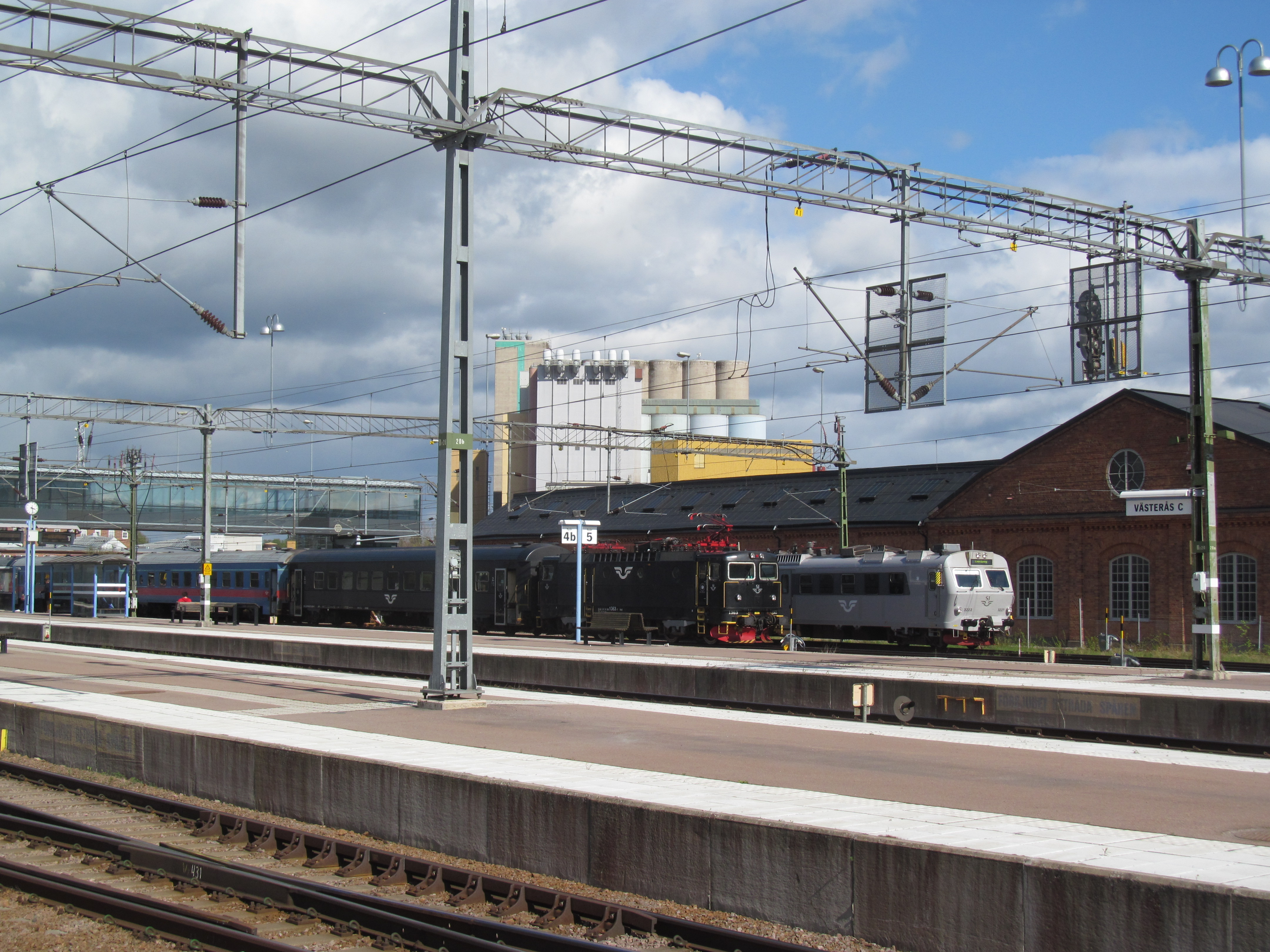
Platforms

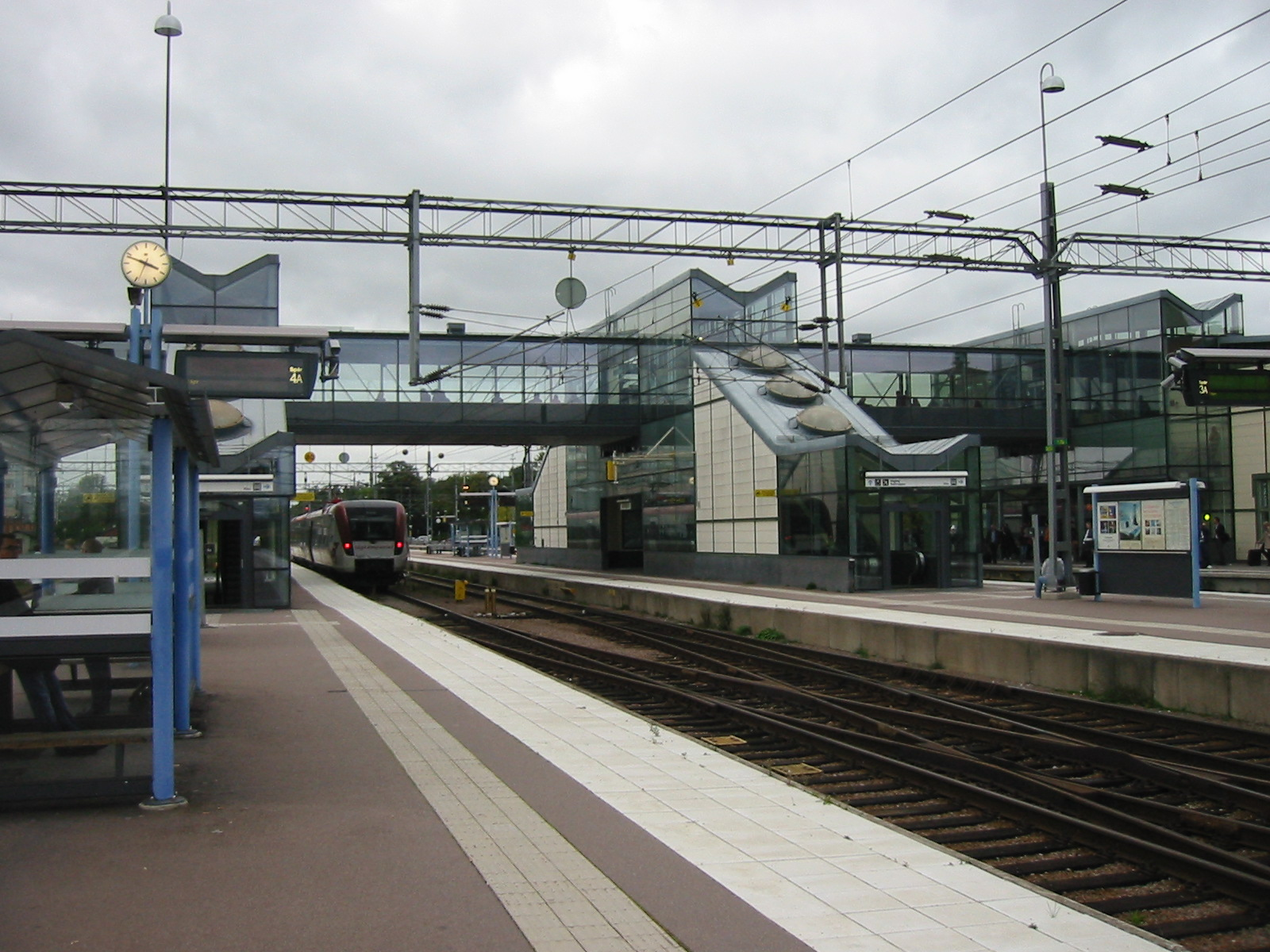
The passenger bridge

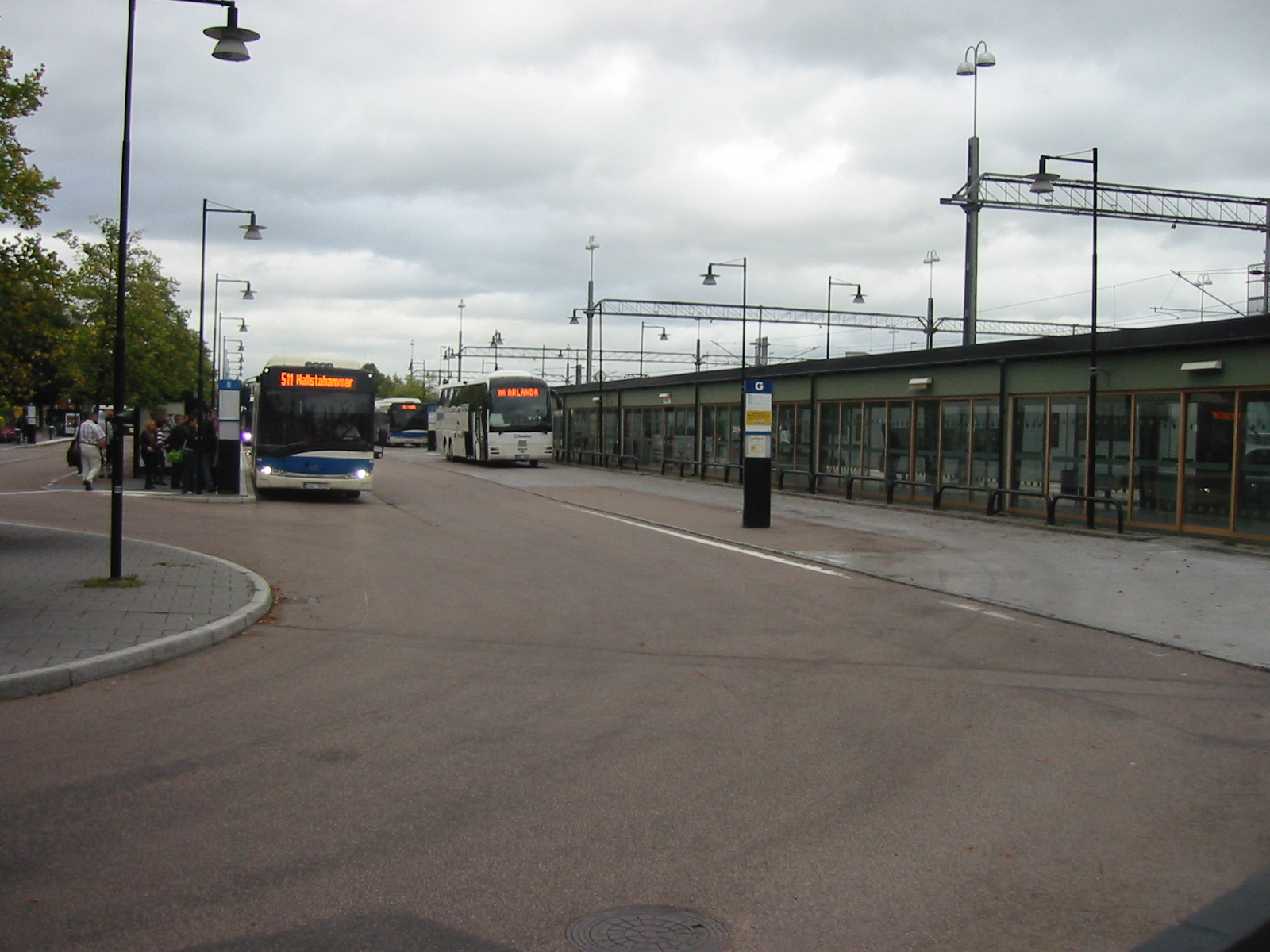
The bus terminal
