= Port Elizabeth railway station =

Railway station in South Africa

Port Elizabeth

General information
- Location: Jetty Street, Gqeberha, 6001
- Coordinates: 33°57′38″S 25°37′30″E
- System: Railway station
- Owner: TFR
- Line: Metrorail: Port Elizabeth Metrorail Shosholoza Meyl: Johannesburg–Port Elizabeth Premier Classe: Cape Town–Port Elizabeth
- Platforms: 7 terminus platforms
- Tracks: 7
- Connections: Apple Express (at Humewood Road)

Construction
- Structure type: At-grade

Services
Preceding station	Metrorail	Following station
North End towards Uitenhage	Port Elizabeth Metrorail	Terminus
Preceding station	Shosholoza Meyl	Following station
Alicedale towards Johannesburg	Johannesburg–Port Elizabeth	Terminus
Preceding station	Premier Classe	Following station
Uitenhage towards Cape Town	Cape Town–Port Elizabeth	Terminus
Location

Port Elizabeth railway station is a railway station, located in Gqeberha, South Africa.

In 1873, Prime Minister John Molteno of the Cape Colony commenced work on connecting Port Elizabeth to the developing national railway network, resulting in the station complex being located in the historic central district, near the harbour. The prosperity which followed the construction of railways to the interior earned for the port the designation of "the Liverpool of South Africa." The station was completed in 1875.

Passenger services operating from the station include:

- Metrorail - operates frequent commuter trains to Uitenhage and the surrounding suburbs during weekdays, with a reduced service over weekends
- Shosholoza Meyl - operates daily inter-city trains to Johannesburg and Bloemfontein. You can also get to Cape Town, Kimberley, Pietermaritzburg and Durban (by changing trains in Bloemfontein), to East London (by changing trains in Noupoort, Colesberg or Bloemfontein), to Mthatha (by changing trains in Noupoort and Amabele) or to Grahamstown (by changing trains in Alicedale)
- Premier Classe - operates twice-weekly luxury trains to Cape Town via George and Oudtshoorn.

The Apple Express narrow-gauge tourist train to Avontuur operated from the separate station in Humewood Road near King's Beach.

== See also ==
- Donkin Heritage Trail
