= Ntabozuko, South Africa =

Ntabozuko Berlin
- Location within Eastern Cape Location within South Africa Location within Africa
- Coordinates: 32.874°S 27.588°E
- Country: South Africa
- Province: Eastern Cape
- Municipality: Buffalo City

Area
  - Total: 38.22 km^{2} (14.76 sq mi)

Population (2011)
  - Total: 3,047
  - Density: 79.72/km^{2} (206.5/sq mi)

Racial makeup (2011)
  - Black African: 94.1%
  - Coloured: 0.7%
  - Indian/Asian: 0.1%
  - White: 4.9%
  - Other: 0.3%

First languages (2011)
  - Xhosa: 91.2%
  - English: 4.5%
  - Afrikaans: 1.9%
  - Other: 2.4%
- Time zone: UTC+2 (SAST)
- Postal code (street): 5660
- PO box: 5660
- Area code: 043

Ntabozuko (formerly Berlin until 23 February 2021) is a small town in the Buffalo City Metropolitan Municipality in the Eastern Cape province of South Africa.

Located about 20 km east of Qonce, it was founded in 1857 by Carl Pape, a missionary, and German settlers of the British-German Legion, and named after the German metropolis of Berlin.

== Transport ==
=== Roads ===
The N2 is the main freeway passing Ntabazuko from Qonce in the west to KuGompo City in the south-east, with off-ramps at La Rochelle Street/Edgar Glass Street. However, the R102 is the main road through Ntabazuko, connecting the small town with Mdantsane and KuGompo City to the south-east.
