= Durban railway station =

Central railway station in Durban, South Africa

Durban
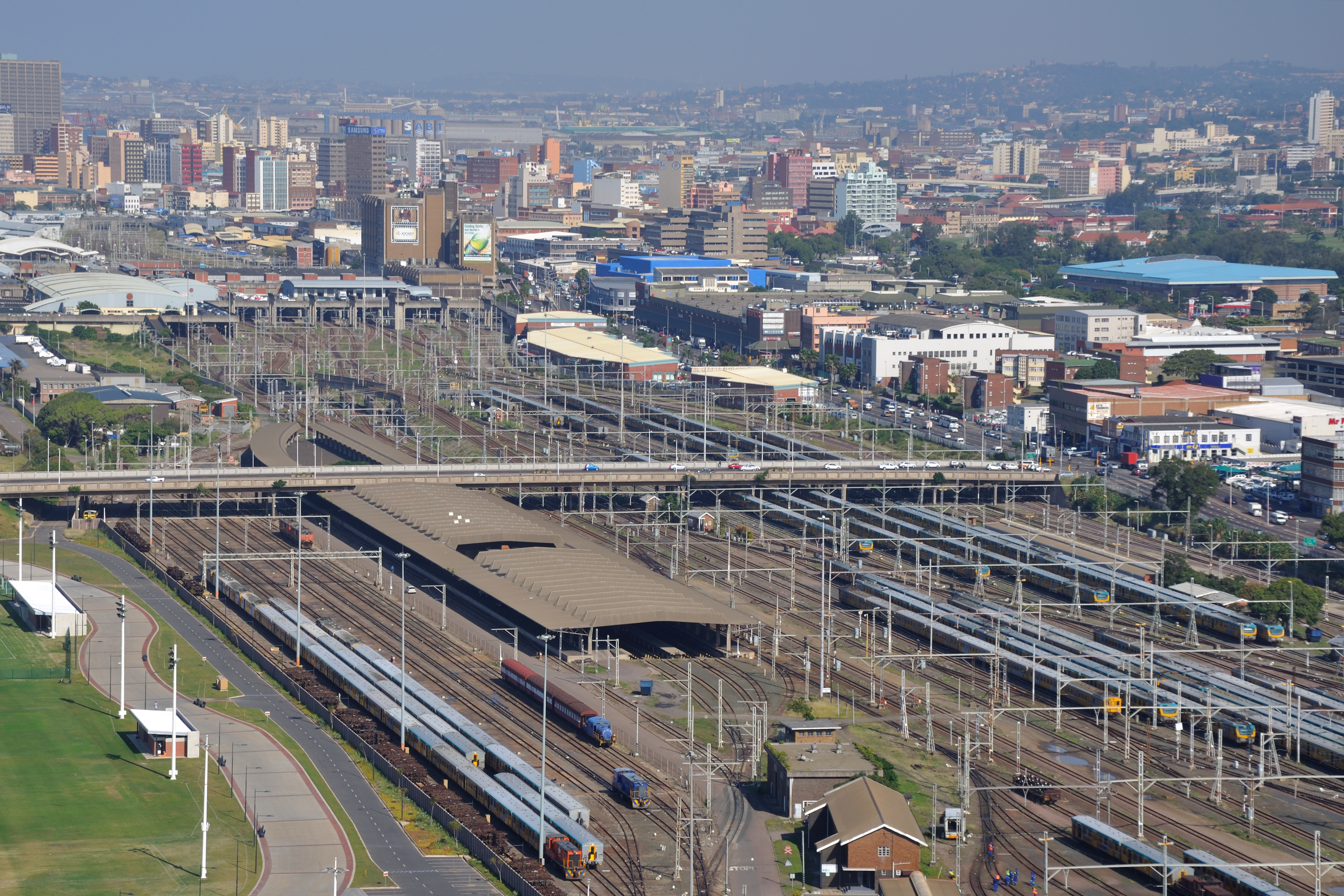
- Durban station seen from Moses Mabhida Stadium, 22 June 2011

General information
- Location: 65 Masabalala Yengwa Avenue, Durban 4000
- Coordinates: 29°50′41″S 31°1′21″E
- System: Railway station
- Owner: PRASA
- Line: Metrorail: Old Main Line New Main Line Chatsworth Line kwaMashu–Umlazi Line North Coast Line South Coast Line Bluff Line Shosholoza Meyl: Johannesburg–Durban Cape Town–Durban Premier Classe: Johannesburg–Durban
Location

Durban railway station is the central railway station in the city of Durban, South Africa, located between Umgeni Road and NMR Avenue / Masabalala Yengwa Avenue just to the north of the central business district. It is the terminus of Shosholoza Meyl long-distance services from Johannesburg and Cape Town, and the hub of a network of Metrorail commuter rail services that stretch as far as KwaDukuza (Stanger) to the north, Kelso to the south, and Cato Ridge inland.

Preceding station	Metrorail	Following station
Berea Road towards Pinetown	Old Main Line	Terminus
Berea Road towards Cato Ridge	New Main Line	Terminus
Berea Road towards Crossmoor	Chatsworth Line	Terminus
Berea Road towards Umlazi	kwaMashu–Umlazi Line	Moses Mabhida towards kwaMashu
Berea Road Terminus	North Coast Line	Moses Mabhida towards Stanger
Berea Road towards Kelso	South Coast Line	Terminus
Berea Road towards Wests	Bluff Line	Terminus
Preceding station	Shosholoza Meyl	Following station
Pietermaritzburg towards Johannesburg	Johannesburg–Durban	Terminus
Pietermaritzburg towards Cape Town	Cape Town–Durban	Terminus
Preceding station	Premier Classe	Following station
Pietermaritzburg towards Johannesburg	Johannesburg–Durban	Terminus
