= Shosholoza Meyl =

Long-distance train service in South Africa

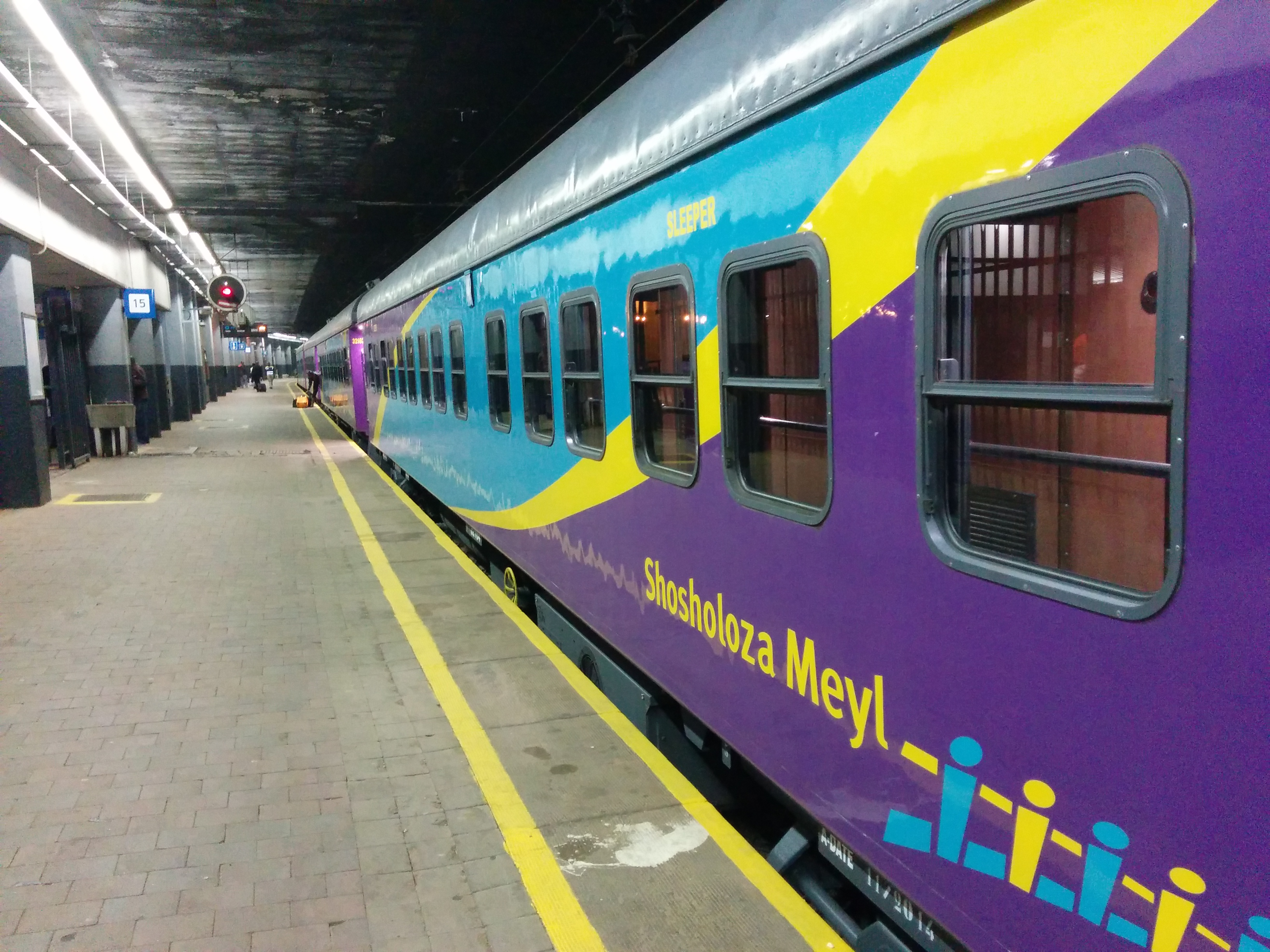
- A Shosholoza Meyl train at Johannesburg Park station in 2015
- Type: Subsidiary
- Industry: Rail transport
- Founded: 1996; 30 years ago
- Headquarters: Johannesburg, Gauteng, South Africa
- Key people: Hishaam Emeran (PRASA Group CEO)
- Products: Long-distance passenger rail
- Website: shosholozameyl.co.za

Shosholoza Meyl is a division of the Passenger Rail Agency of South Africa (PRASA) that operates long-distance (intercity) passenger rail services. It operates various train routes across South Africa, carrying approximately 4 million passengers annually. Before 2009, Shosholoza Meyl was a division of Spoornet, but it was transferred after the formation of PRASA.

"Shosholoza" is the name of a popular South African song about workers on a train and it therefore means moving forward. "Meyl" is a word that is related to a South African word for "long distance train", according to the Spoornet/Shosholoza Meyl website. The company's name prior to change was "Mainline Passenger Services".

In August 2010, Shosholoza Meyl suspended services claiming either contract difficulties (between Transnet and Prasa) or unreliable trains. Some services began to resume in November 2010.

Shosholoza Meyl services were suspended by PRASA following a fatal crash with a goods train on 12 February 2020. A revised service was introduced from 27 November 2020. Three of the four services in operation were suspended in October 2024 due to a lack of locomotive capability. Currently a reintroduction of passenger services from Johannesburg to Queenstown, Durban, Musina, and Cape Town is planned for 2027, but concerns have been raised over the feasibility of this as most PRASA funding is earmarked for Metrorail.

== Routes ==
Shosholoza Meyl route map (several routes shown were not operating in 2024)

As of October 2024, Shosholoza Meyl only operates during the December to March peak season and only on the following route:

- Johannesburg – Bloemfontein – Queenstown - East London

== Track and equipment ==
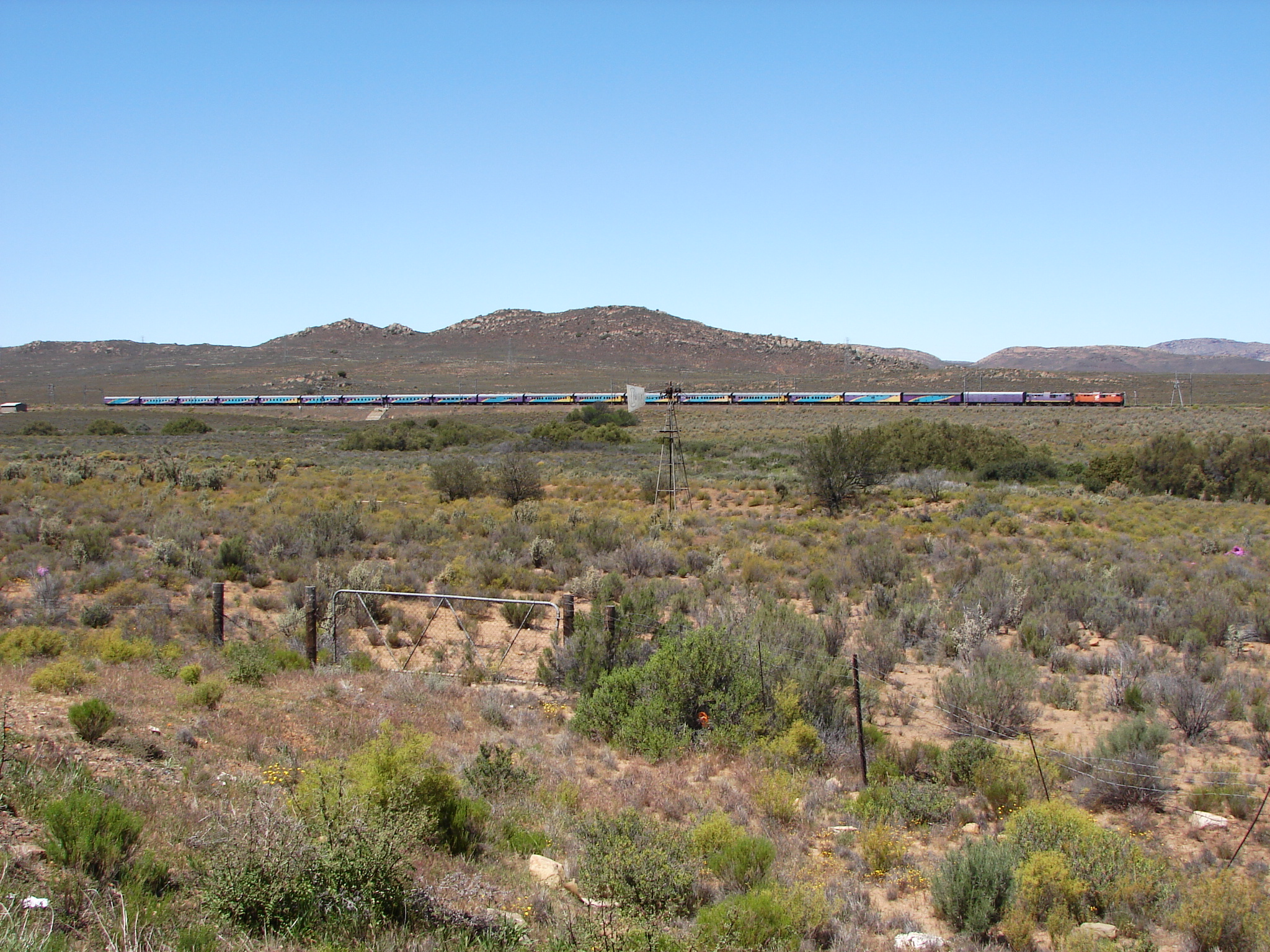
Shosholoza Meyl at Quarry loop near Touws River

Shosholoza Meyl trains run on the Cape gauge (1,067 mm (3 ft 6 in)) Transnet mainline track. The trains are locomotive-pulled. Most routes are completely electrified 3 kV DC and 25 kV AC systems, usually class 6E1 or class 18E locomotives on the 3 kV system and class 7E on the 25 kV system. Diesel is used on the Johannesburg – Port Elizabeth trains between Bloemfontein and Noupoort, and on the Durban - Cape Town trains between Bloemfontein and Kimberley. Before 2002, the Pretoria – Cape Town trains were hauled by diesel locomotives between Kimberley and De Aar.

== Coaches ==
The trains are made up of three types of coach:

- Sleeper 4: six 4-person compartments and two 2-person coupés, plus shower and toilet facilities.
- Sleeper 6: six 6-person compartments and two 3-person coupés, plus shower and toilet facilities.
- Sitter: 72 seats, in 18 rows of 4 seats with an aisle in the middle, plus toilet facilities. There are also various older types of carriages with differing levels of comfort used as sitters.

Since 1 July 2006 Shosholoza Meyl has operated its sleepers and sitters as separate trains. Starting from 1 November 2006 sleeping carriages were re-introduced on selected Economy Trains, this decision was however reversed shortly thereafter. Now the Economy Trains convey 'Sitter' carriages only.

== Incidents ==
On 4 January 2018, a passenger train operated by Shosholoza Meyl collided with a truck on a level crossing near Kroonstad. The train was derailed and at least one of the carriages caught fire. Twenty one people were killed and 254 were injured.

On 12 February 2020, another Shosholoza Meyl train collided with a goods train near Bonny Doone Road in Horizon View, west of Johannesburg. One person died in the incident and several people were injured. After the incident, the Railway Safety Regulator suspended all Shosholoza Meyl train operations indefinitely.

== See also ==
- Spoornet
- Transnet
