= Timeline of Gqeberha =

The following is a timeline of the history of Gqeberha in the Nelson Mandela Bay Municipality, Eastern Cape province, South Africa.

== Prior to 20th century ==
- 1754 - Dutch settlements at the Cape extended eastwards to adjacent Algoa Bay.
- 1799 - Fort Frederick built by British during the Napoleonic Wars.
- 1820 - Port Elizabeth settlement founded by British.
- 1823 - Population: 319.
- 1836 - Made a free warehousing port
- 1841 - Jetty constructed in Algoa Bay.
- 1845 - Eastern Province Herald newspaper begins publication.
- 1856
  - Grey High School founded.
  - King George VI Art Gallery opens.
- 1859 - St George's Park founded.
- 1861 - Town of Port Elizabeth incorporated.
- 1862 - Western-Road Synagogue formed.
- 1865 - Hill Presbyterian Church consecrated.
- 1866 - St. Augustine's Cathedral built.
- 1873 - Railway station building starts.
- 1875
  - Uitenhage-Port Elizabeth railway begins operating.
  - Port Elizabeth railway station built.
- 1880 - Prince Alfred's Guard Drill Hall built.
- 1881 - Horsecar tram begins operating.
- 1882
  - Imbumba yama Nyama political group formed.
  - Conservatory built in St George's Park.
- 1885 - "South African Exhibition" held
- 1888 - Mighty Elephants rugby team formed.
- 1889 - St George's Park Cricket Ground in use.
- 1892 - Opera House built.
- 1897 - Electric tram begins operating.
- 1899 - Humewood Road railway station built.
- 1900 - Post Office built.

== 20th century ==
- 1900-1902 - Port Elizabeth Concentration Camp in operation
- 1903 - New Brighton black township established.
- 1905 - Horse Memorial erected.
- 1907
  - NG gemeente Port Elizabeth (church) founded.
  - Prince Alfred's Guard Memorial unveiled.
- 1908
  - Port Elizabeth Orthodox Hebrew Congregation formed.
  - Devastating flooding
- 1912 - Raleigh Street Synagogue built.
- 1913 - Port Elizabeth gains city status.
- 1917 - Airplane flown from Cape Town to Port Elizabeth.
- 1928 - NG gemeente Port Elizabeth-Sentraal (church) founded.
- 1929 - Port Elizabeth Airport and Gereformeerde kerk Port Elizabeth (church) established.
- 1936 - Campanile (belltower) installed.
- 1937 - Oosterlig newspaper begins publication.
- 1940 - NG gemeente Port Elizabeth-Wes (church) founded.
- 1940 - Victoria Park High School was founded
- 1949 - Adcockvale suburb laid out (approximate date).
- 1950 - Evening Post newspaper begins publication.
- 1951 - Van Stadens-veldblomreservaat (nature reserve) established near city.
- 1952 - Govan Mbeki, Raymond Mhlaba and Vuyisile Mini were imprisoned for three months in Rooi Hel ('Red Hell' or North End Prison, Port Elizabeth) for participating in the Defiance Campaign.
- 1954 - 20th Century Theatre in business.
- 1960
  - Boet Erasmus Stadium opens.
  - Alliance Française of Port Elizabeth founded.
- 1961 - 16 December: Bombings.
- 1964 - University of Port Elizabeth established.
- 1965 - Walmer, South Africa becomes part of Port Elizabeth.
- 1969 - Kouga Dam begins operating in vicinity of city.
- 1979 - Port Elizabeth Black Civic Organisation founded.
- 1984
  - Port Elizabeth Youth Congress founded.
  - Development of Motherwell begins near city.
- 1985
  - March: Labor strike.
  - 8 May: Disappearance of "Pebco Three" anti-apartheid activists.
  - 27 June: The deaths of "The Cradock Four" political activists.
- 1986 - Jewish Pioneer's Memorial Museum established.^{(de)}
- 1991 - Population: 303,353 city; 853,205 metro.
- 1995
  - Nceba Faku elected mayor.
  - Part of 1995 Rugby World Cup contest played in Port Elizabeth.
- 1996 - Part of 1996 Africa Cup of Nations football contest played in Port Elizabeth.

== 21st century ==
- 2001
  - Port Elizabeth becomes the seat of the newly created Nelson Mandela Bay Metropolitan Municipality.
  - Anti-apartheid leader Govan Mbeki dies at age 91.
- 2004 - Website Mandelametro.gov.za launched.
- 2005
  - First premier of the Eastern Cape and anti-apartheid leader Raymond Mhlaba dies at the ages of 85 years.
  - Nelson Mandela University formed.
  - Red Location Museum of apartheid opens.
- 2006
  - 1 March: South African municipal elections, 2006 held.
  - Nondumiso Maphazi becomes mayor.^{(fr)}
  - Bay United F.C. (football club) formed.
- 2009
  - Nelson Mandela Bay Stadium opens.
  - Zanoxolo Wayile becomes mayor.^{(fr)}
  - Southern Kings rugby team formed.
- 2010
  - Gelvandale Stadium opens.
  - Part of 2010 FIFA World Cup football contest played in Port Elizabeth.
- 2011 - Population: 312,392.
- 2013
  - Part of 2013 Africa Cup of Nations football contest played in Port Elizabeth.
  - Ben Fihla becomes mayor.
- 2015
  - Danny Jordaan becomes mayor.
  - Chippa United F.C. moved to the city from Cape Town.
- 2016 - Athol Trollip becomes mayor.
- 2021
  - Name officially changed from Port Elizabeth to Gqeberha.
- 2023 - Eight people are killed in a mass shooting.

== See also ==
- History of Gqeberha
- List of heritage sites in Gqeberha
- Timelines of other cities in South Africa: Cape Town, Durban, Johannesburg, Pietermaritzburg, Pretoria

== Bibliography ==
- "Directory of Port Elizabeth". Cape of Good Hope Almanac and Annual Register for 1853. Cape Town: Van de Sandt de Villiers & Tier. 1852.
- Port Elizabeth Directory and Guide to the Eastern Province of the Cape of Good Hope. Port Elizabeth: J.W.C. Mackay. 1877.
- John Noble, ed. (1886). "Cities and Towns of the Colony". Official Handbook: History, Productions and Resources of the Cape of Good Hope. Cape Town: Saul Solomon & Co. for the Colonial & Indian Exhibition Committee. "Port Elizabeth"
- "Port Elizabeth" . Encyclopædia Britannica. Vol. 22 (11th ed.). 1910. pp. 112–113.
- Eleanor K Lorimer (1971). Panorama of Port Elizabeth. Cape Town: A. A. Balkema. OCLC 297945.
- H.O. Terblanche (1977). "Die trek van die Afrikaner na Port Elizabeth" [Trek of the Afrikaner to Port Elizabeth]. Historia. 22 (1). Historical Association of South Africa: 90–107. hdl:10520/AJA0018229X_323.
- A. J. Christopher (1987). "Apartheid Planning in South Africa: The Case of Port Elizabeth". Geographical Journal. 153 (2): 195–204. Bibcode:1987GeogJ.153..195C. doi:10.2307/634871. JSTOR 634871.
- J.G. Nel (1989). "Making of an Apartheid City: The Case of Port Elizabeth, Republic of South Africa". African Urban Quarterly. 4. ISSN 0747-6108.
- A. J. Christopher (1991). "Port Elizabeth". In Anthony Lemon (ed.). Homes Apart: South Africa's Segregated Cities. Indiana University Press. ISBN 0-253-33321-0.
- Janet Cherry (1993). "myth of working class defeat: Port Elizabeth in the post-war years". Kronos: Journal of Cape History. 20. University of the Western Cape. hdl:10520/AJA02590190_435.
- H.O. Terblanche; M.J. Swart (1993). "Die Afrikaner se stryd om taalgelykberegtiging in Port Elizabeth, 1902-1937" [Afrikaner's struggle for language equality in Port Elizabeth, 1902-1937]. South African Journal of Cultural History (in Afrikaans). 7. hdl:10520/AJA10113053_59.
- Jennifer Robinson (1993). "Politics of urban form: differential citizenship and township formation in Port Elizabeth 1925-1945". Kronos: Journal of Cape History. 20. hdl:10520/AJA02590190_434.
- Gary Baines (1998). "Port Elizabeth history: a select annotated bibliography". South African Historical Journal (38).
- H.O. Terblanche (1998). "Die stigting van die eerste Afrikaanse koerante in Port Elizabeth" [Foundation of the first Afrikaans newspapers in Port Elizabeth]. South African Journal of Cultural History (in Afrikaans). 12 (1): 60–74. hdl:10520/AJA10113053_103.
- Gary Baines (2004). "A Progressive South African City?". Journal of Urban History. 31.
