= Donkin Heritage Trail =

Pedestrian route in Port Elizabeth, South Africa

The Donkin Heritage Trail is a 5 km self-guided walking trail along the old hill of central Gqeberha, Eastern Cape, South Africa. The Donkin Heritage Trail is named after the acting Governor of the Cape Colony, Rufane Shaw Donkin.

The trail links 51 places of historical interest and showcases settler history from as early as 1820. Sites include groups of double-storey semi-detached houses with prominent Victorian and Georgian features. These were erected shortly after the turn of the 20th century. It consists of five residences in Donkin Street, facing onto the Donkin Reserve. One of the residential homes is located at 14 Constitution Street and two others located at 8 and 10 Whitlock Street. The Donkin Street complex forms a notable row of terrace houses, and is one of the city's most prominent landmarks. Many of the landmarks have been declared national monuments.

== Places on the Donkin Heritage Trail ==
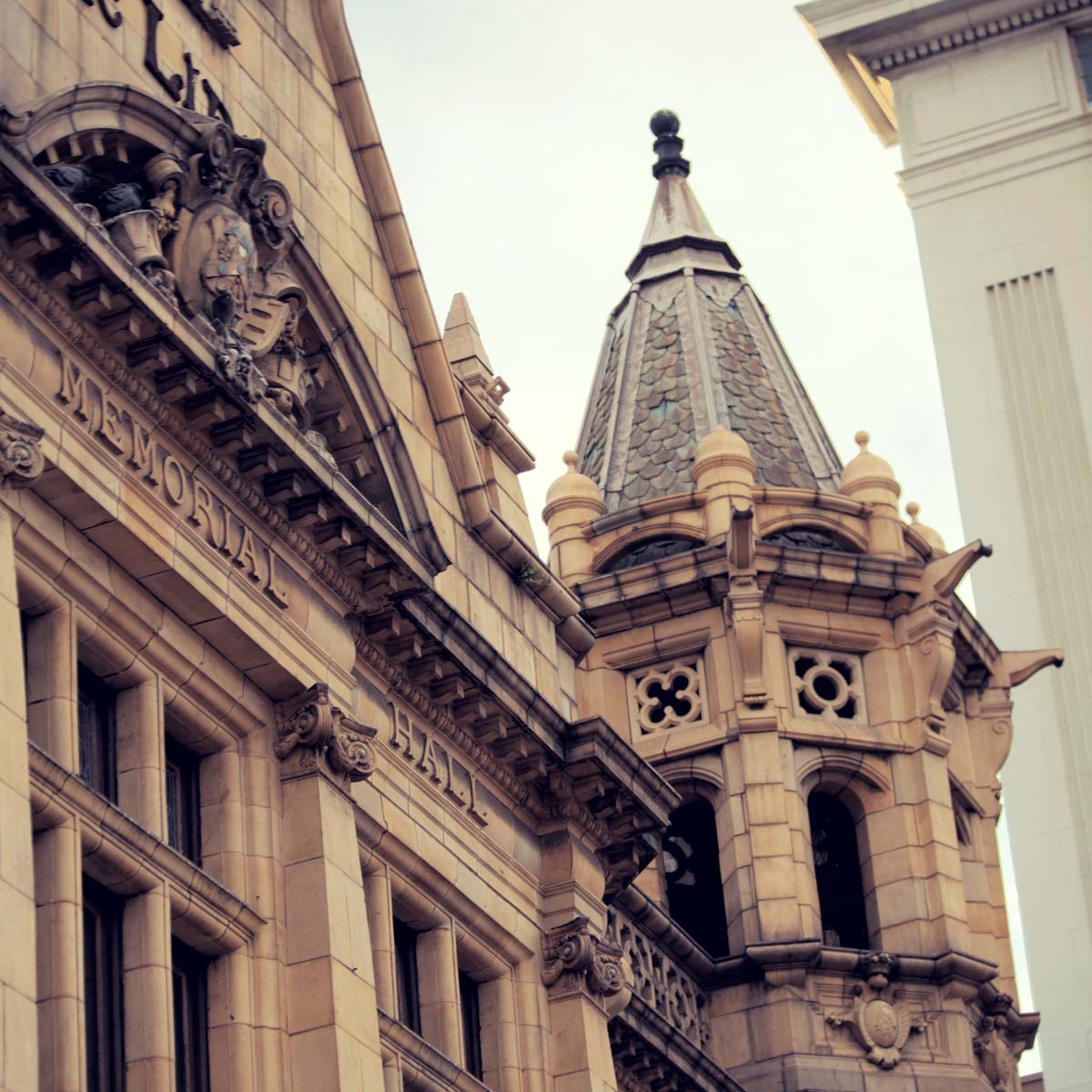
The Port Elizabeth Main Library

=== Main Library ===
The Main Library building with Victorian Gothic architecture, is on the corner of Market Square.

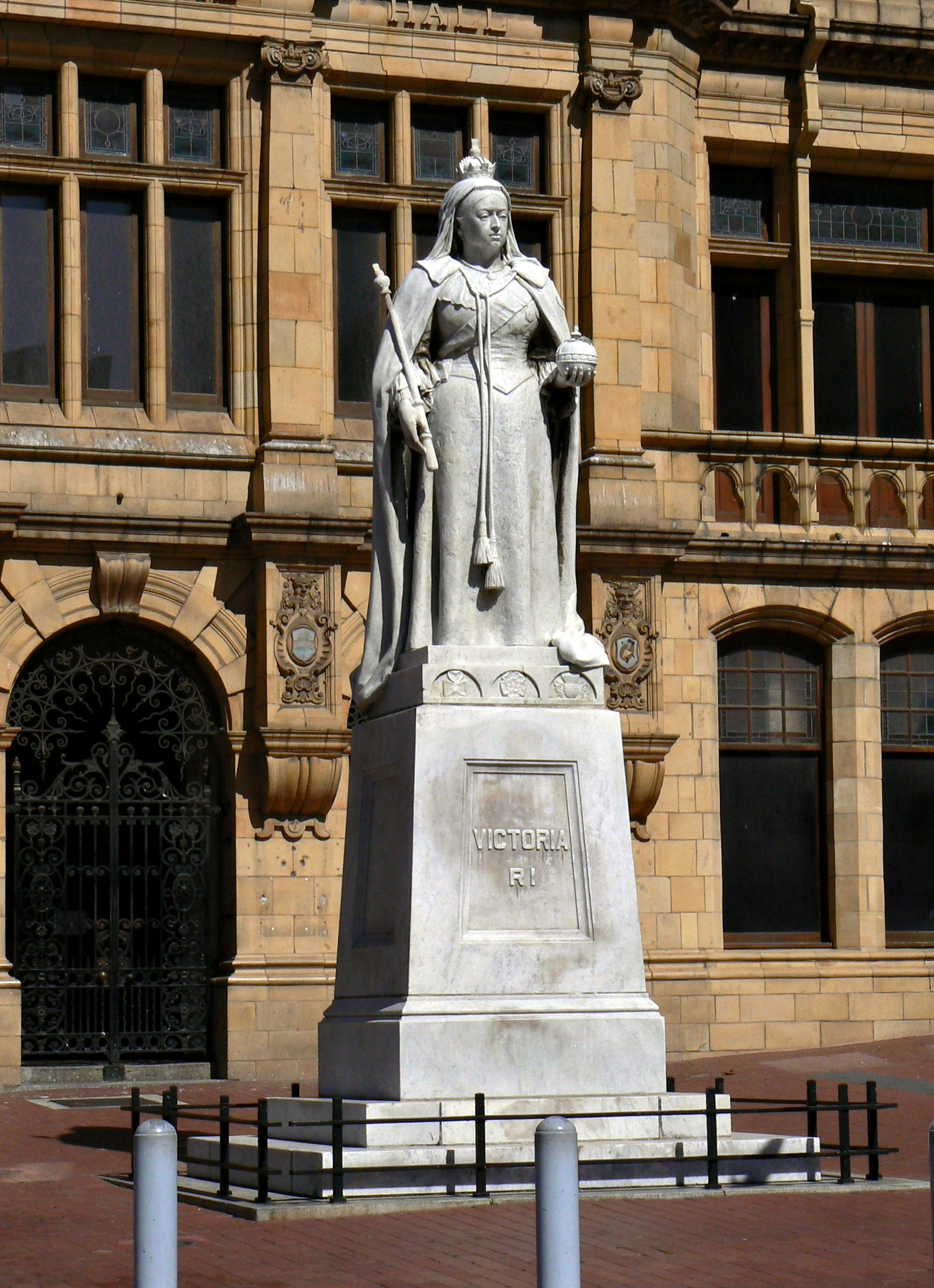
The Queen Victoria statue in front of the Main Library, Gqeberha, South Africa.

=== Queen Victoria Statue ===
A marble statue of Queen Victoria stands at the entrance of the library.

=== Market Square ===
The trail begins at this site, the centrepiece of the Market Square is the City Hall. There is a replica of the Diaz Cross, commemorating the first European to sail into Algoa Bay in 1488.

=== City Hall ===
The City Hall is central to the Market square and dates back to 1858.

=== Prester John Memorial ===
The Prester John Memorial is a Coptic Cross with two figures inside it. It commemorates the Portuguese explorers who discovered South Africa as well as the story of a far older mythical figure named Prester John. Between the 12th and 18th centuries Prester John was believed to have been an early Christian King and one of the descendants of the Three Magi of Christian belief. He was the ‘patron’ of Christian exploration of the world and is seen as ‘a symbol to European Christians of the Church’s universality, transcending culture and geography to encompass all humanity’ and therefore a figurehead for Portuguese sailors and explorers.

=== Campanile ===
The Campanile is a 120-foot bell tower, which was built in the 1920s to commemorate the 1820 Settlers. The first proposal for a memorial tower to commemorate the landing of the British Settlers of 1820, was made in 1904 by the Reverend Alfred E Hall, a minister of the Queen Street Baptist Church. On 9 April 1921, the foundation stone of the Campanile was laid by H R H Prince Arthur of Connaught, governor of the Union of South Africa. On 10 March 1922, the design for the Campanile was approved and the contract for building the structure was subsequently awarded on 18 March 1922 to a local firm of builders, Harris and Harrower Limited. The tender was worth £6 150. It took approximately 18 months to complete the campanile. The dressed stone, used to construct the base, was taken from some of the oldest buildings in the city and the arched main doorway was built of stone quarried in Grahamstown. The tower is made of brick and reinforced with concrete. Each brick went through a quality test before being used. The structure, both base and belfry, is made of local brick faced with smooth, red Grahamstown bricks. The roof tiles were also obtained from Grahamstown.

Architecturally, the Campanile is well-proportioned, lofty and slender and simple. The structure is reminiscent of the famous St Mark's Campanile in Venice, which is 320 feet high. The Campanile in Gqeberha is 170 feet high from ground level to the tip of the pyramid roof. The area of the structure at the base is 23 feet square, its foundation resting upon sea-worn rock. The windows at different floor levels are fitted with decorative precast concrete grilles and the belfry. There are eight floors within the tower and to reach the observation floor, which is approximately 136 feet above the floor level of the reception area, the visitor has to climb 204 steps. The frieze of the reception area is artistically inscribed with brief details of the events connected with the erection of the Campanile.

The tower was erected at a final cost of £5 940, but there was neither clock nor bells for the proposed carillon, so that fund-raising was started for that purpose. The largest bell in the carillon is about 6 feet in diameter and weighs between three and four tons. The bells were hoisted into position in the belfry during July 1936 and the first recital on the carillon was given on 9 September by Lionel Field, Mus Bac, ARCM.

Six of the bells were sponsored by descendants of 1820 Settlers as a tribute to their forebears, or by others who wished to honour their memory. Details are embossed on each of the 23 bells which are engraved on a brass plaque affixed to a wall in the reception area of the Campanile. Bells are rung from the campanile three times a day. The 204-step spiral staircase leads to views over Algoa Bay. The Campanile is partially overshadowed by the Settler's Freeway, however, it remains a focal point of the city's built environment.

=== Railway Station ===
The Port Elizabeth railway station, located north of the Campanile, and the Railway Station building existed since 1875, when the first line was constructed to Uitenhage approximately 40 Kilometres away. The original building was designed by James Bisset, Resident Engineer, Harbour and Public Works. Additions including the cast-iron supported roof of the main concourse, were designed by E.J. Sherwood and was completed by 1893. S.A. Transport Services renovated the station which was re-opened on 8 August 1985.

=== Old Harbour Board Building ===
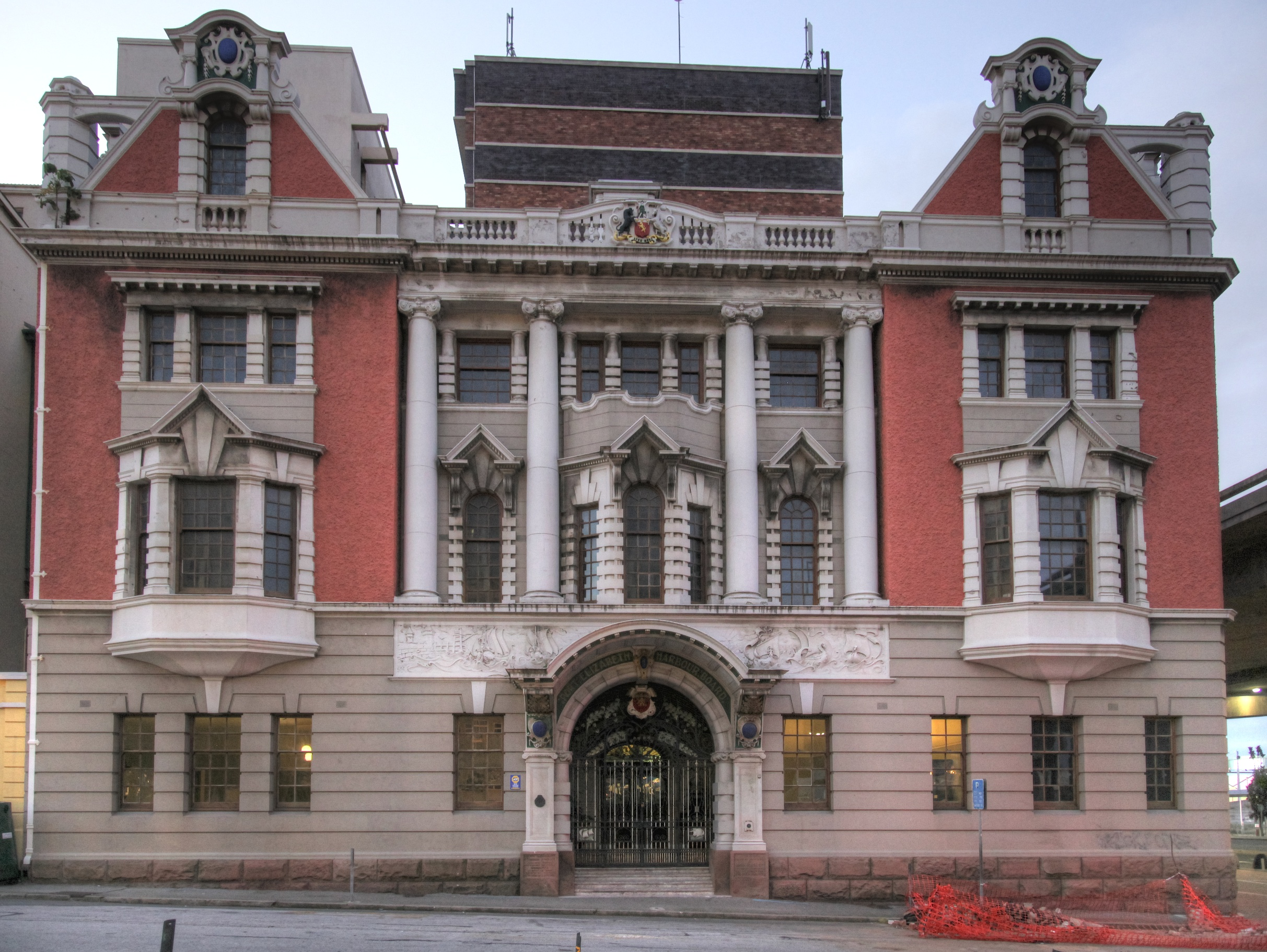
Old Harbour Board Building on Fleming street

The Harbour Board Building, a national monument, is also known as 'the White House'. It is situated on the Remainder of Erf 1762, Gqeberha Central, in the Municipality and Division of Gqeberha and measures 3 Morgen 41 square roods 141.4 square feet.

=== Old Post Office ===
The Old Post Office is situated at the top of Flemming Street an lies directly behind the City Hall. It was opened in 1900 and was designed by the Public Works Department of the Cape Colonial Government. Its style is typical of public buildings of the late Victorian era. Later, the building incorporated the former Magistrate's Court building erected in 1885 and the police station and barracks.

=== Feather Market Centre ===
The Feather Market Centre is located in the Market Square and was named for its history as a trading and auction house for ostrich feathers in the late 1800s till the early 1900s.

=== 7, 10 & 12 Castle Hill ===
Number 7 Castle Hill is believed to be one of the oldest surviving settler cottages in the city. No 7 Castle Hill was completed in 1825 and is one of the oldest surviving Settler cottages in Gqeberha. Following renovations, No. 7 Castle Hill, was opened as a Museum in 1965. The two buildings 10-12 Castle Hill, were originally owned by Police Constable Sterley, date from about 1840, and together with the adjacent house at 7 Castle Hill, are typical examples of early English settler architecture of their time. They were declared a National Monument under old NMC legislation on 2 November 1973.

=== Prince Alfred's Guard Drill Hall ===
Prince Alfred's Guard Drill Hall is located on the corners of Castle Hill, Prospect and Daly Streets in the center of Gqeberha. Built in 1880, the building is the headquarters of one of the oldest volunteer regiments in South Africa - the Prince Alfred's Guard (PAG) Regiment.

=== Athenaeum Building ===
The Athenæum was first declared as a national monument in 1980. It stands on Belmont Terrace, guarded by historic Gqeberha streets, Military Road and Castle Hill in the suburb of Central near the port. The building is one of the few examples of the classical style of architecture in the city and was designed by George William Smith.

=== Fort Fredrick ===
Fort Fredrick is one of the city of Gqeberha's oldest structures. The fort was built at the mouth of the Baakens River in 1799 in order to defend against any invasion of French troops during the Napoleonic Wars. The French troops never invaded and the cannons were never fired. The cannons are still located in the area.

=== Port Elizabeth/St George's Club ===
St George's Park is the oldest park in Gqeberha and is within walking distance of the city centre. The Park incorporates the internationally renowned Port Elizabeth Cricket Club, the founding cricket club in South Africa as well as the oldest bowling green in South Africa (named "Founders Green"), the St. George's Park Swimming Pool, Prince Alfred's Guard Memorial as well as the 1882 Victorian Pearson Conservatory, which was built for the cultivation of exotic plants, water lilies and orchids.

=== Trinder Square ===
Trinder Square was originally a natural wide pond used for watering cattle and horses. The pond has since been filled in and is used as a playground for children. Trinder was a family name of the merchants Joseph and William Smith who owned property nearby.

=== Hillside House ===
In 1824, the property was granted to George Daniel Diesel . The building was erected after that date and is richly decorated with a number of Victorian architectural elements. It accommodated numerous famous Gqeberha citizens, including its Harbour Master, the Civil Commissioner and James Somers Kirkwood, after whom the village was named. It was declared a National Monument under old NMC legislation on 9 December 1988.

=== Fleming House ===
The original portion of the manor-house known as Fleming House, together with the garden and the boundary wall fronting onto Bird Street, at 20 Bird Street, Gqeberha

=== Cora Terrace ===
The Georgian home was built in the 1850s to house soldiers guarding the port of Gqeberha. It now functions as a guesthouse.

=== Holy Rosary Convent ===
A catholic school established in 1867. Later, in 1983, the Holy Rosary Convent, Marist Brothers College and Priory High merged to form Trinity High School

=== Mannville Open Air Theatre ===
The Mannville Open Air Theatre which is located on the South-Western side of St George's Park, Park Drive, Central. The theatre is named after Bruce and the late Helen Mann. They chose the site in consultation with the then Director of Parks, because of the sheltered, quiet and sylvan area. Since the first production in 1972, a Summer Shakespearean Festival is presented in February every year.

=== Pearson Conservatory ===
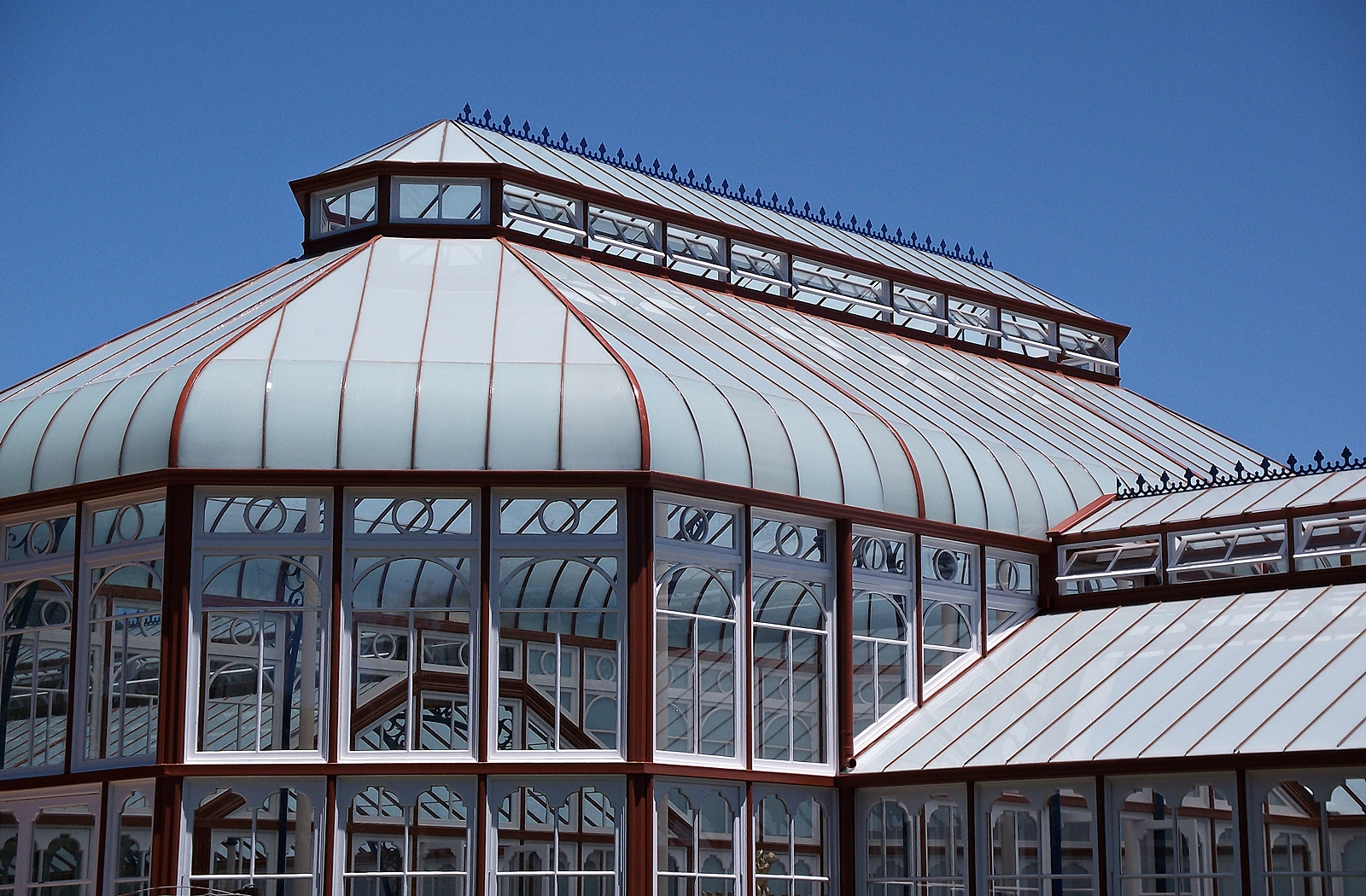
The Pearson Conservatory which is located in St George's Park, Gqeberha, South Africa

Pearson Conservatory, a glass framed Victorian observatory, was constructed in 1882 and is located within Gqeberha's St Georges Park. It has undergone approximately R5,5m worth of renovation over the past 128 years. According to the National Heritage Resources Act of 1999, the building is listed as a Grade II structure of significance.

=== Prince Alfred's Guard Memorial ===
Prince Alfred's Guard Memorial developed from a fusion of a military museum formerly housed in the Donkin Reserve complex and the regimental museum of the Prince Alfred's Guard Regiment.

=== Sharley Cribb Nursing College ===
The house “Sundridge” was built by architect G W Smith in 1897 for A E Allen Smith and his wife Emily (born Savage) in the Art Nouveau style. In 1929 Herman Sammel converted it into the very modem Park Hotel by adding a large bedroom wing thereafter, a ballroom was also built. It has been the Nursing College since 1949 and the house has been restored. Sharley Cribb is remembered for her services in the cause of nursing reform.

=== Horse Memorial ===
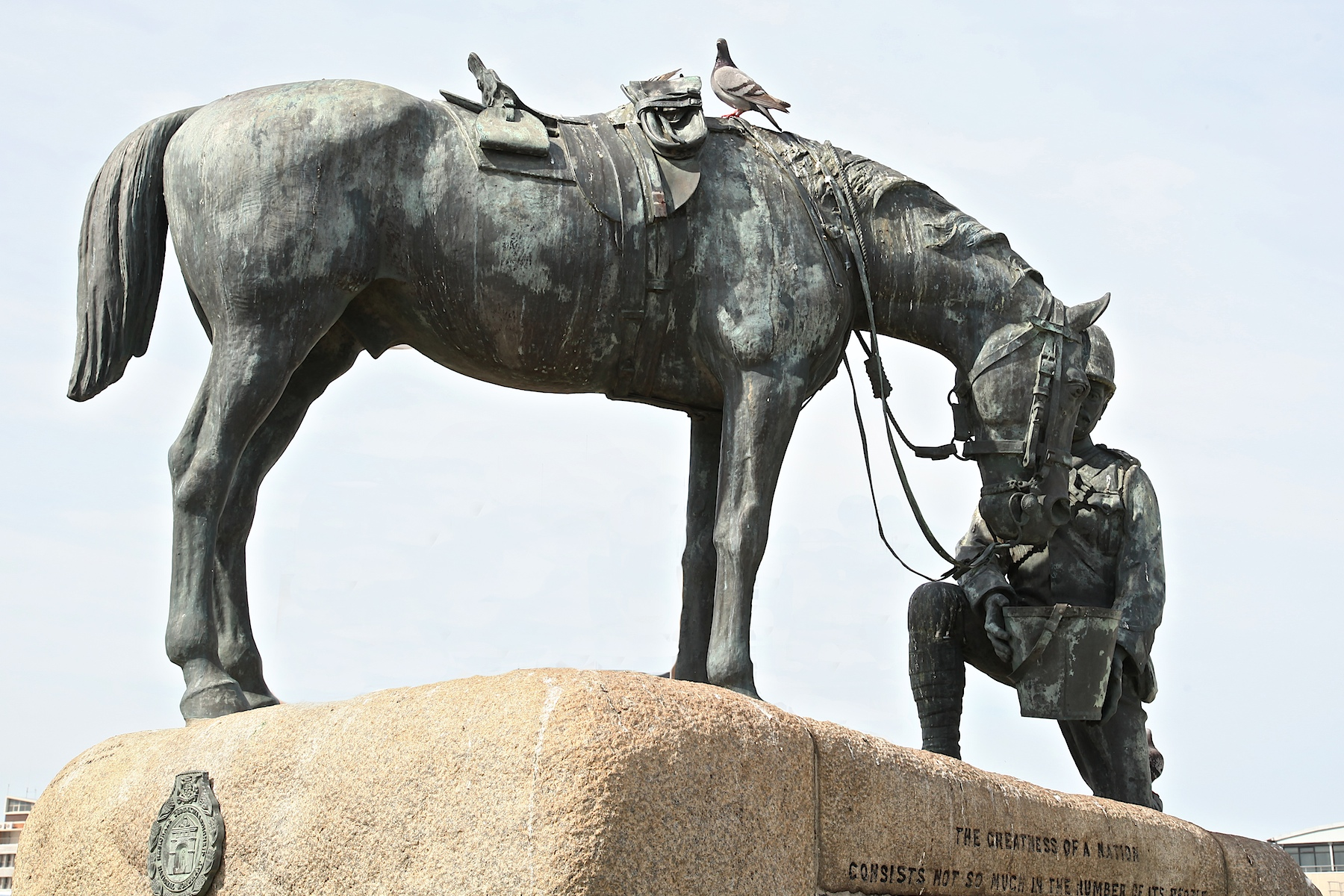
The Horse Memorial

The Horse Memorial is dedicated to the hundreds of thousands of horses that were transported to PE during the Anglo-Boer War between 1899 and 1902. Many of these horses died on-route, while being offloaded at the docks or during combat. The bronze statue showing a soldier kneeling at the head of a tired and thirsty horse was designed by British sculptor Joseph Whitehead, and cast in Surrey, England. The life-size statue was erected in 1905 and stands on a granite horse trough at the juncture of Russell Road and Cape Road. The statue is a protected National Heritage structure.

=== The Hill Presbyterian Church ===
The Hill Presbyterian Church is situated at the corner of Belmont and Alfred Terrace. In 1861 the Rev. George Renny was brought to Port Elizabeth as minister to the Presbyterian community. Services were held in the Old Grey Institute while the present church was being constructed. It was consecrated in 1865. The architect was Mr F.M. Pfeil.

=== Grey Institute ===
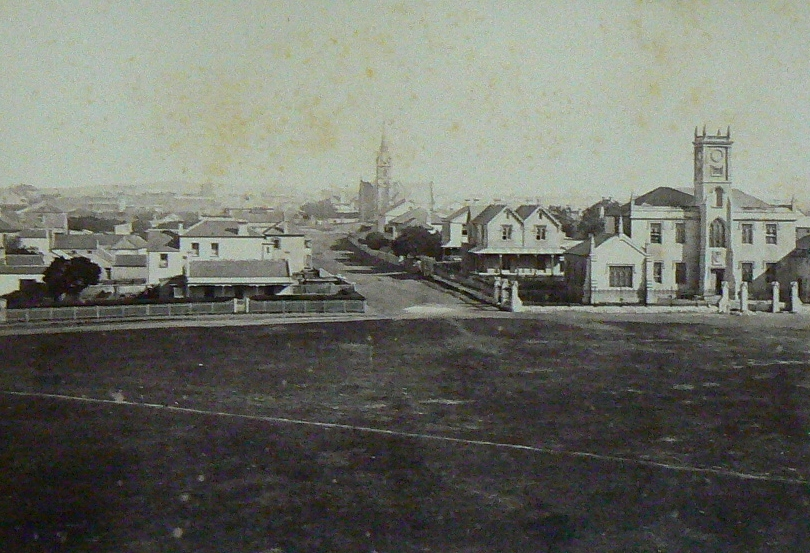
Early photo of the Grey Institute in Port Elizabeth

The school was named in honour of the Governor, in recognition of his contribution to education in the colony. Classes commenced in January 1859 for elementary classes and in April 1859 for the high school. A clock tower was added to the building in 1875. the high school was moved to new premises due to space constraints. The school then became known as the Albert Jackson School. The old building continued to serve the needs of the preparatory school. It was declared a National Monument under old NMC legislation on 10 December 1976.

=== Donkin Reserve, Pyramid and Lighthouse ===
The trail starts at the Donkin Reserve and Lighthouse, where a map of the trail can be purchased. The Nelson Mandela Bay Tourism Info Centre is located in the old lighthouse . The Opera House is also located here. The pyramid was built in memory of Sir Rufane Donkin's wife Elizabeth on the hill which is now known as Donkin's Reserve

=== Opera House ===
The Opera House was built in 1892 and was run mainly by candlelight. The Opera House is the oldest running theatre in Africa and is the only Victorian style theatre left on the continent. The Port Elizabeth Opera House and Barn Theatre are located halfway down Whites Road, Central. It was proclaimed a national monument in 1980.

=== Other sites ===
Other sites include:

- The Moorings
- Annerley House
- 5 Bird Street
- Pembridge House
- 8 & 10 Bird Street
- Old Museum
- Cenotaph
- NMM Art Museum
- Knockfierna
- Ron Belling Art Gallery
- St George's Park, Gqeberha
- Pearson St Congregational Church
- St John's Methodist Church
- Holy Trinity Anglican Church
- Restored Houses
- Victoria House
- Donkin Street Houses
- Isapearson Street
- King Edward Hotel
- Grand Garden's Hotel
- St Augustine's RC Cathedral
- St Mary Anglican Cathedral

== See also ==
- Algoa Bay
- Bell tower
- List of heritage sites in Port Elizabeth
- Victorian architecture
