= Feather Market Centre =

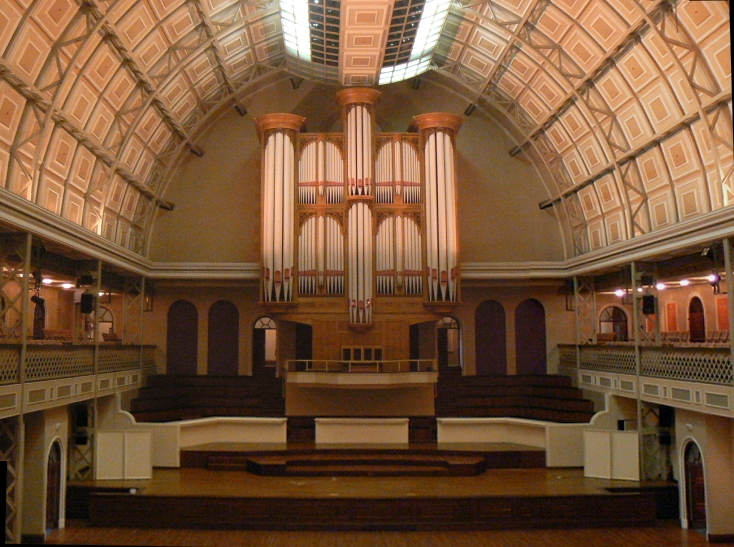
- Interior of main hall
- Interactive map of the Feather Market Centre area

General information
- Classification: Provincial Heritage
- Location: Gqeberha (Port Elizabeth), South Africa
- Coordinates: 33°57′47″S 25°37′24″E
- Year built: 1883-1885, 1908
- Opened: December 10, 1885
- Renovated: 1993

Design and construction
- Architects: William Henry Miles, Arthur Shaw Butterworth

The Feather Market Centre, formerly known as the Feathermarket Hall is a historic public building in Gqeberha, formerly Port Elizabeth, in the Eastern Cape, South Africa. It stands near the harbour and the Baakens River and remains one of the city's most significant heritage structures.

== History ==
The site was originally used as a wool market from 1863. With the rapid growth of the ostrich feather industry in the late nineteenth century, the municipality required a dedicated auction and storage facility close to the harbour. Planning for a new market building began in the 1870s.

In 1878 a design competition was held for new market buildings, including a feather market, restaurant, and offices for the Chamber of Commerce. Although the original plans were abandoned due to cost, the roof design by the British civil engineer Sir John Wolfe Barry was already commissioned and constructed in England. The roof was shipped to Port Elizabeth in 1882.

William Henry Miles was appointed consulting engineer in 1881 and tasked with designing a building to fit the completed roof. Construction used local stone with Coega stone facings. The roof structure was erected in 1883, with the largest principal weighing approximately eight tons.

The Feathermarket Hall officially opened on 10 December 1885. The opening coincided with the South African Exhibition and was conducted by the Governor of the Cape Colony, Sir Hercules Robinson. The first ostrich feather sale in the new hall took place on 2 February 1885.

Original Building (1885)

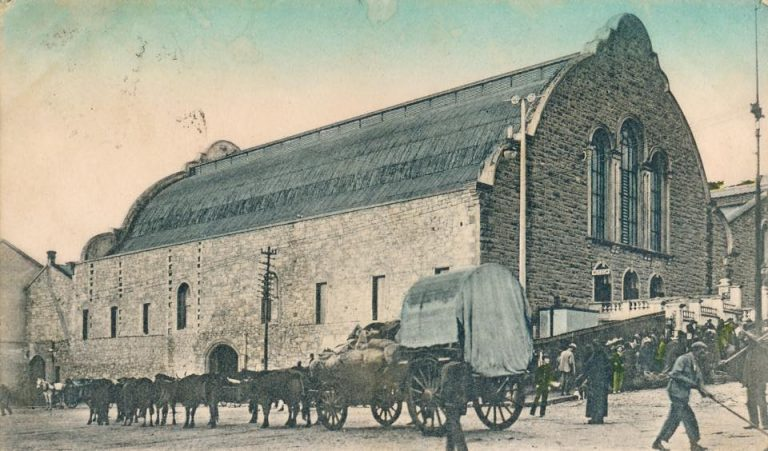

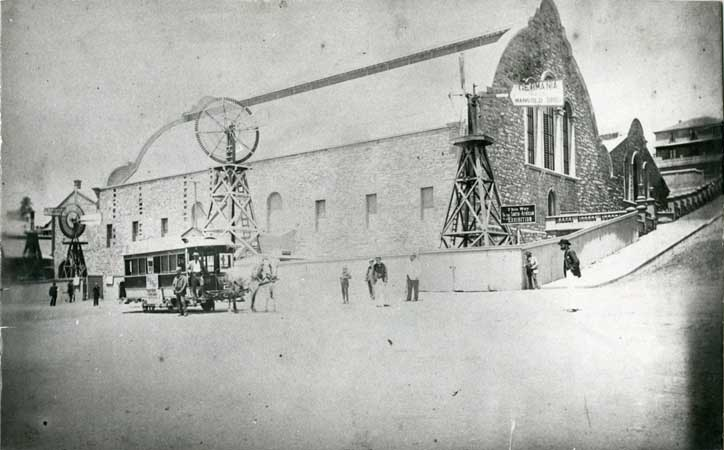

Due to financial constraints, Miles's proposed front building facing Baakens Street was postponed for more than two decades.

In 1908 a new frontage and extension were completed along Baakens Street. This work was designed by the municipal engineer Arthur Shaw Butterworth and became known as the Market Buildings. The extension provided additional market space and office accommodation. A verandah was added in 1917.

Feathermarket Hall extension (1908), as seen from Baakens Street.

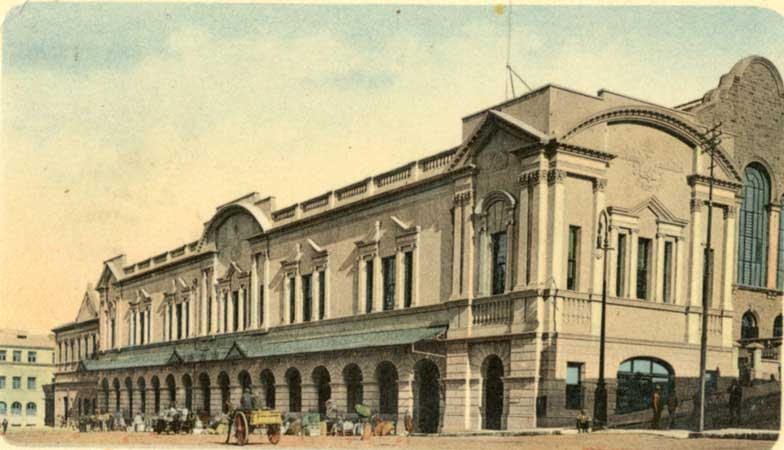

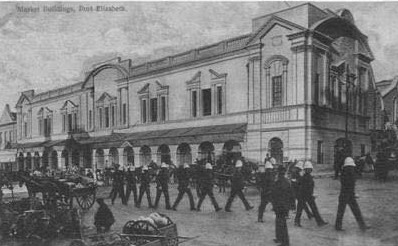

== Historic uses and notable events ==
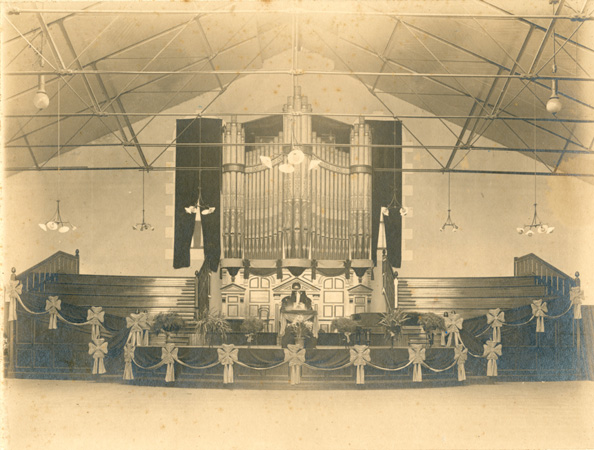
Feathermarket Hall (1910)

The primary original function of the hall was as an auction and storage venue for ostrich feathers. As the ostrich feather industry declined, the hall was adapted for broader civic use. It hosted concerts, exhibitions, public meetings, and unusual events. One of the most notable occurred in March 1892, when a parachute descent was performed indoors by the aeronaut Stanley Spencer during a public lecture on ballooning. Each performance attracted around 800 spectators.

During the South African War, the hall was used for public functions, including a Christmas dinner for troops in 1900. In later decades it continued to serve as a major venue for concerts and civic gatherings.

== The organ ==
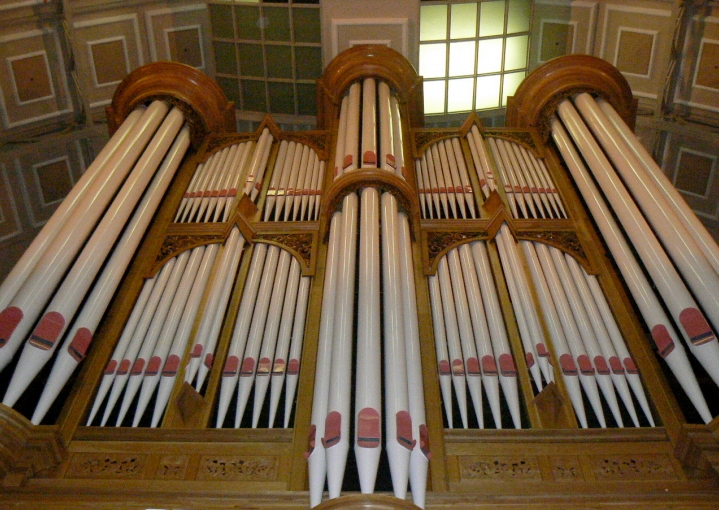
Organ in main hall

A large pipe organ was installed in the Feathermarket Hall in the 1890s. The instrument was built by Norman and Beard of Norwich and was originally exhibited at the Kimberley Exhibition of 1892. The Port Elizabeth municipality purchased the organ for £2,000 after the exhibition.

The organ was installed in the Feathermarket Hall due to the Town Hall being too small to accommodate it. The inaugural recital took place on 15 June 1893. Roger Ascham served as municipal organist and performed more than 1,000 concerts on the instrument between 1895 and his death in 1934.

== Present use ==
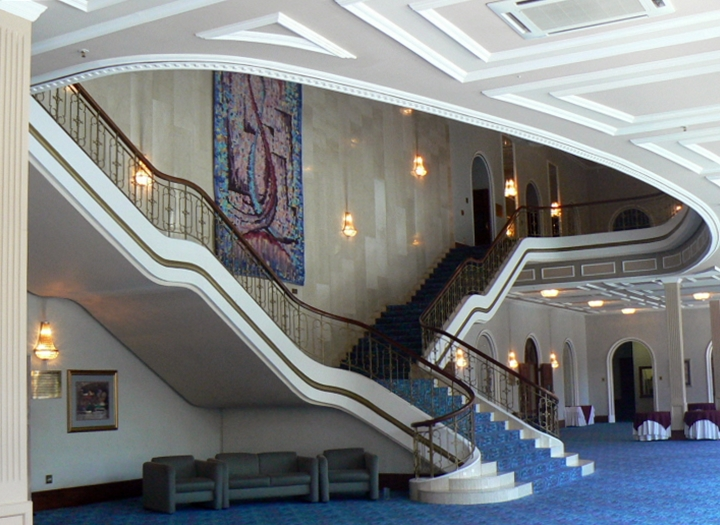
Main stairway

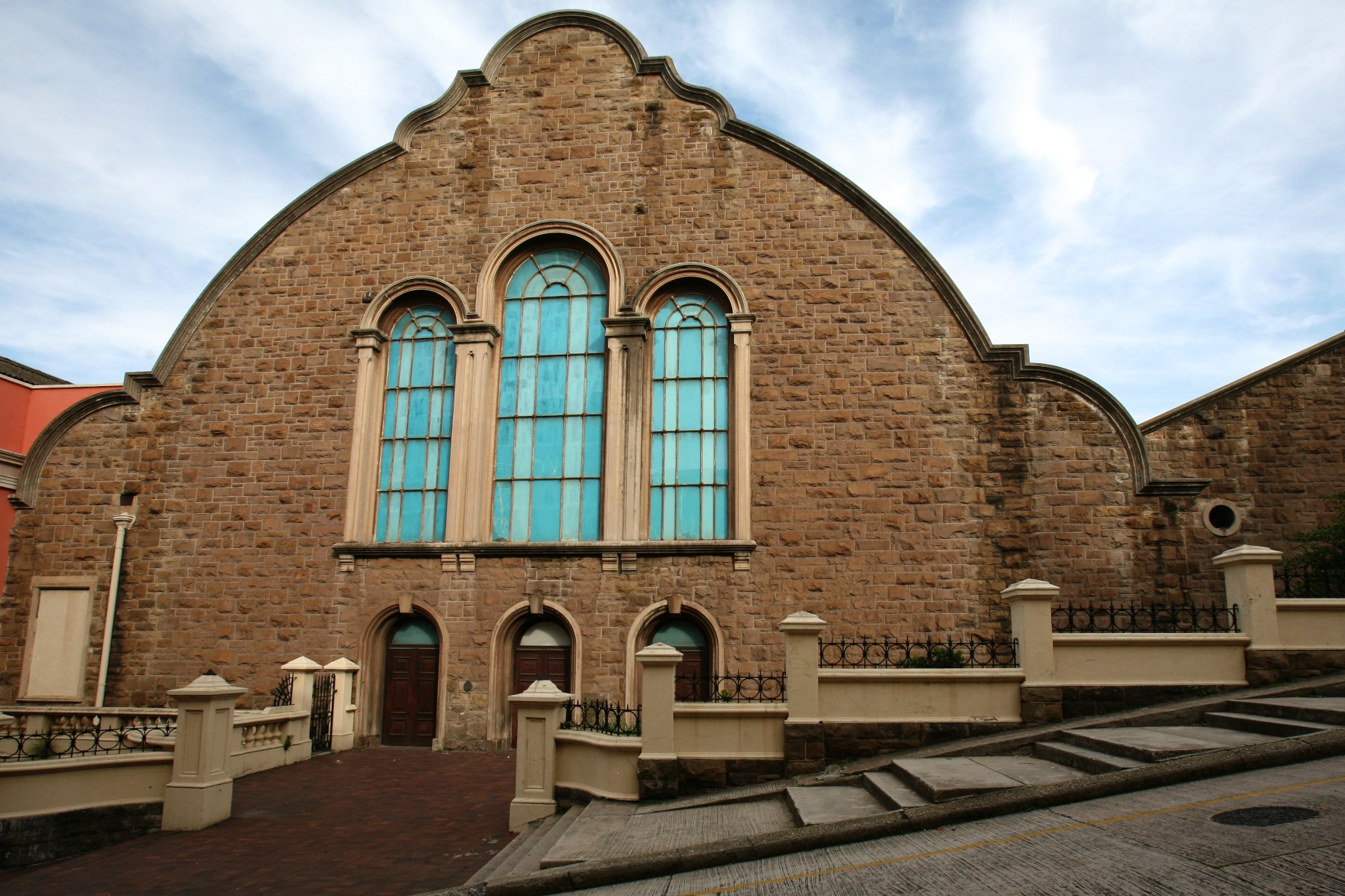

The Feathermarket Hall was declared a national monument in 1980. In 1993 the building and its 1908 extension were extensively refurbished by municipal architects and reopened as the Feather Market Centre. The complex now includes conference facilities and a concert hall.
