= Port Elizabeth Concentration Camp =

Political internment camp in South Africa

The Port Elizabeth Concentration Camp was a British run concentration camp in Port Elizabeth, South Africa, at that time part of the Cape Colony, used as part of the Boer War. It was active from December 1900 to around November 1902. Originally sited on Port Elizabeth racecourse, it was moved to higher ground, two miles north-west of the town. It housed 200 children and 86 women behind a 1.5-m high fence, in zinc and iron huts. A separate, fenced camp housed 32 men nearby. Under John Fox Smith, the racetrack had been used earlier to house Uitlander refugees from Boer territory, but the growing Boer population led to relocating such internees to the location described here, a former Prince Alfred's Guard barracks.

Only a few died in this so-called "model camp" compared to the thousands elsewhere, mainly because of its situation on the coast, near a major supply center. Most of those interned here were Orange Free State citizens from Jagersfontein and Fauresmith, who were considered to be aiding the enemy. Among them were the mother, wife, three sisters-in-law, and children of Gen. and future Prime Minister of South Africa J. B. M. Hertzog. He later told Dr. J.P. Botha: "My wife endured the hardships of the Port Elizabeth concentration camp. Our son was four months old when the war began. The merciful and provident hand of the Lord allowed both to survive and return to me."

== Life in the camp ==
The camp was controlled by British military authorities out of Bloemfontein. It was located on what is now Lenox St, near what is now the Mount Road South African Police Services station, the former John Brown's Dam, and today's Kemsley Park Police Sports Ground and Old Grey Sports Club. The women and older girls did most of the cooking, discipline, and cleaning, taught, and conducted Bible study, concerts, and other forms of recreation. They washed, ironed, and tailored clothes for the 17,000 white inhabitants of the town to make extra income. The British scorched earth policy had plunged most of these families, after all, into misery. Mrs. a volunteer from Stellenbosch, played an important role in making life more bearable for the internees.

Traveling pastors regularly ministered there, since the Port Elizabeth Reformed Church (NGK) would not be founded until 1907. Congregations and other organizations in the district contributed food, clothes, and money, part of the general solidarity ethos among Afrikaners at the time.

Circumstances were better here than in other camps, one of the reasons this camp and the nearby one in Uitenhage are lesser-known. Emily Hobhouse, who came from England to visit the camps as secretary of the South Africa Conciliation Committee, writes in her book The Brunt of the War, and where it Fell that Lord Rowntree, who visited the camp and wrote to his colleagues in England about how well people were treated in the camps, and his wife watched the arrival of a group of Free Staters: "Mostly women and children, many with babes in their arms, many children stumbling alongside and clinging to a dress or hand; most of them tired, sad, sullen, with an expression of distress at once on their face and their clothing." He also said that "everyone, even the smallest of children, carried something valuable in their hands, a gourd, a kettle, a small bundle of clothes, here and there a sack with a few victuals; a lonely woman petted her cat."

The New York Times in their article "The Alleged Ill-Treatment of Boer Women" carried a brief from the Hon. T.J. Ferreira where he alleged bad treatment of the "exiles" contrary to British rules. He himself visited the Port Elizabeth camp, "determined to seek the truth" and stayed there. "The food was excellent," he acknowledged, and continued to describe a feast of top sirloin and coffee. According to him, the women and children were "very fortunate, had no reason to complain, and were very happy to stay there until they could return home."

Some did escape, however. Hendrina Rabie-Van der Merwe, earlier a sister in the Boer Commando Red Cross, was caught and sent to Port Elizabeth. She wrote in her book, Onthou!, how she and a good friend, Hannie Marais, ran away from the camp with Hendrina dressed as a little girl, a distinct possibility given the latter's diminutive statue. Beyond the gate was a grove of trees, behind which they rolled her dress 12 inches to just below her knees. She wore a colored blouse and a straw hat on top, and loosened her hair. Hendrina pretended to be an English bridesmaid, Helen Taylor, in need of transit to Humansdorp. The plan worked, though she was caught later. She escaped several times, and was later held in prisons rather than camps.

Sarah Raal wrote of the mood in the Camp when news broke of the surrender in her book, Met Die Boere In Die Veld ("With the Boers in the Veld"):

Camp Commandant Richards gave notice that everyone should see his front office at nine o'clock. When we arrived, he was standing on a cart drawn by two mules. He stood upright on the bench of the car with a cypress switch in his hand. When nine o'clock hit, he said: "It's peace, it's peace, the Boers have lost their homeland." Then he jumped off the seat, sat down, and the mules pulled the cart away. For a few minutes, a dead stillness set in, and the women began to cry. Some thought the commandant was lying, others tore up their Bibles, and the rest threw their hats in the air and shouted "hurray." I went to the tent to cry into my pillow.

A. Coetzee also discussed conditions in the camp in his Diaries of the Concentration Camp at Port Elizabeth.

== Port Elizabeth Concentration Camp Memorial ==
Early attempts were made to establish a monument on the site of the camp were stymied by City Council opposition. The Summerstrand branch of a women's organization known as the Dames Aktueel, supported by their colleagues in the city Rapportryers, nevertheless donated the money and built the monument, which was finally unveiled on October 29, 1983, by Professor Marius Swart of Stellenbosch University. The cost was around R4,500, paid out to architects Maritz & Maritz and contractors Strydom, Basson, & Tait.

The symbols in the memorial are as follows:

- Barbed wire fence: Confinement
- Dark bricks: Squalid conditions
- Light bricks: Afrikaners
- Plaque: Women and children as the heart
- Gap in fence: Hope of liberation
- No roof: Faith and prayers unobstructed

Men, women, and children travelled in a wagon on 11 August 2001, from the Camp site to the Dutch Reformed Church in South Africa (NHK) church in Newton Park for a commemoration of the victims of the camps throughout the Republic, followed by folk theatre. The wagon, named after Hendrina Rabie-Van der Merwe, carried a chest with a guestbook for the anniversary event in Bloemfontein.

== Grave memorial ==
Fourteen people died at the concentration camp during the Second Boer War between November 1900 and April 1902. With the exception of two paid burials, among others that of a nephew of Gen. Hertzog, the dead were buried in the potter's field of the indigent in the North End Cemetery. This section was poorly maintained, with no gravestones and great difficulty separating one from another.

After hearing several testimonials, City Council agreed to dedicate a 6x2-m plot of ground where most of the graves were found to build a memorial. The local Afrikaner Liaison Committee (Afrikaans: Afrikaanse Skakelkomitee) took the lead in the initiative, and on October 10, 1959, a memorial plaque and stone were unveiled on this land, the highlight of Heroes' Day that year. The great-nephew of Cabinet Minister Dr. Albert Hertzog, who spent time in the camp as a child in 1901, unveiled the plaque (the great-nephew was also named Albert Hertzog). In addition to choral singing and dedication, wreath-laying and flag-raising ceremonies were held.

The name of the camp victims was written on a granite memorial, set on rough river-stone pavement. It was still a temporary project, and the need arose to replace it with a new, permanent one.

On 10 October 1970, once more on Heroes' Day, the new, concrete memorial that cost R1,300 was unveiled. The Afrikaner Liaison Committee built it in conjunction with the National War Graves Council. The names, ages, and death dates of the camp victims are written on a large marble tombstone with the words "We for you, South Africa" (Afrikaans: Ons vir jou Suid-Afrika) from the national anthem Die Stem van Suid-Afrika prominently featured as well.

The War Graves Council was later replaced by the National Monuments Council and in 1999 was incorporated into the Graves Unit of the South African Heritage Resources Agency. The monument has suffered minimal vandalism, and save for the theft of the bronze plate from the war graves, the only thing amiss is the preponderance of broken liquor bottles from homeless people taking shelter from the notorious Port Elizabeth wind and rain behind the high concrete walls. The monument is therefore in good condition for a public, municipal cemetery.

== Sources ==
- "Afrikanerbakens in PE" 3 and 4. Oosterlig.
- Die Burger. August 13, 2001.
- Encyclopaedia Of South African Arts, Culture And Heritage.
- Harradine, Margaret (1994). Port Elizabeth: A Social Chronicle To The End Of 1945. Port Elizabeth: E.H. Walton Packaging (Pty) Ltd
- Krebs, Paula M (2004). Gender, Race And The Writing Of Empire: Public Discourse On The Boer War. Cambridge: Cambridge University Press. https://books.google.com/books?id=NybU4YwwQC&dq=port+elizabeth+boer+war+concentration+camp&pg=PP1
- Marais, Pets (1999). Die Vrou In Die Anglo-Boereoorlog 1899-1902. Pretoria: Uitgewers (Edms) Bpk.
