= Baakens River =

River in the Eastern Cape, South Africa

Baakens River Baakensrivier
- Location of the Baakens River's mouth
- Native name: Gqeberha (Xhosa); Kragga Kamma (Khoekhoe)

Location
- Country: South Africa
- Region: Eastern Cape

Physical characteristics
- Mouth: Indian Ocean
  - location: Algoa Bay
  - coordinates: 33°57′50″S 25°37′45″E
- Length: 23 km (14 mi)

The Baakens River, also known as Gqeberha River (Xhosa: [ᶢǃʱɛ̀ɓéːxà]), is a river that empties at Port Elizabeth's city centre and harbour in Algoa Bay.

The river flows for about 23 km (14 mi) from its catchment area at Sherwood, Hunter's Retreat, and Rowallan Park through mainly urban area to its mouth. Mostly, it is a small quiet stream. Near its mouth, it runs into a gorge on the south side of the hill on which Fort Frederick lies.

Until the first VOC ships docked here in 1690, the creek was known by the Khoekhoe name from the Gonoqua tribe, Kragga Kamma (//Kraxa/kamma), 'the rocky creek (or //kara - meaning pebbles in the river and kamma being a corruption of the Khoe word //gami - meaning water)'.

In time, the last 2 km (1.2 mi) of the stream was canalised and the small lagoon filled up. Parks, sports grounds and hiking trails have been laid out in parts of the Baakens Valley.

== History ==
In 1752, ensign August Frederik Beutler passed by and erected a beacon (baken in contemporary Dutch) on behalf of the VOC at the estuary.

The 54 ha Settler Park has existed since 1938. The valley was in the years 1867, 1897, 1908 (1908 Port Elizabeth flood), 1968, 1981 and 2006 the scene of severe floods, floods and great damage. On 5 May 1897, the cause was a cloudburst at Hunter's Retreat. On Sunday 1 September 1968, it started to rain just after 8am and within a short time more than 56 cm fell. In the most devastating flood that South Africa had experienced until then, 8 people lost their lives.

Gqeberha is the name for this river in Xhosa. The neighbourhood Kabega Park may have been named after this river.

== See also ==
- List of rivers in South Africa
