= Prince Alfred's Guard Memorial =

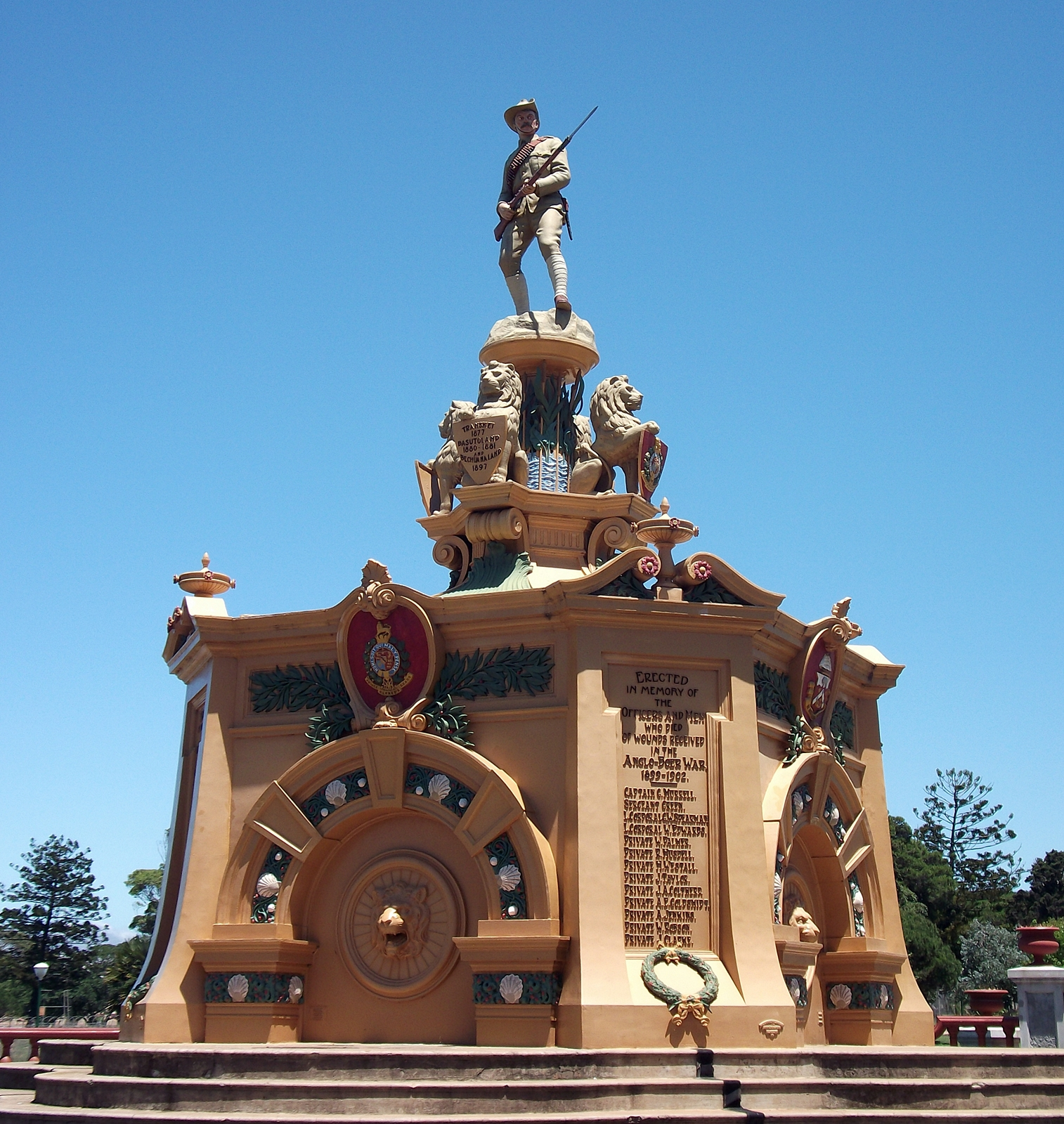
- Interactive map of Prince Alfred's Guard Memorial
- Location: St George's Park in Port Elizabeth, South Africa
- Coordinates: 33°57′50″S 25°36′22″E
- Designer: Boyd and Son
- Type: War memorial
- Opening date: 12 September 1882
- Dedicated to: officers and men who made the supreme sacrifice in the Transkei War, Basuto War, Bechuana War and the Anglo Boer War

Prince Alfred's Guard Memorial is a provincial heritage site in St George's Park in Port Elizabeth in South Africa's Eastern Cape province. The memorial is situated on top of Port Elizabeth's second oldest reservoir. On November 6, 1907 the Honourable Edgar H Walton, MLA, Treasurer General of the Cape Colony, unveiled the memorial to the fallen of the Prince Alfred's Guard.

In 1983, it was described in the Government Gazette as

The Prince Alfred's Guard Memorial is one of the largest and heaviest architectural products in the Victorian idiom manufactured by the Saracen foundry of Walter MacFarlane of Glasgow in Scotland. The structure is a fitting tribute to the memory of the officers and men who made the supreme sacrifice in the Transkei War (1877), Basuto War (1880-1881), Bechuana War (1897) and the Anglo Boer War (1899-1902).

== Design ==
On each of the four corners of the base of the memorial is a tablet bearing the names of officers and men who fell in the following wars:

- Transkei War (1877)
- Basutoland War (1880-1881)
- Bechuanaland War (1897)
- Anglo Boer War (1899 - 1902)

At the foot of each tablet is a laurel wreath.

== See also ==
- Prince Alfred's Guard
- Donkin Heritage Trail
