= Trams in Port Elizabeth =

Former public transport system in Port Elizabeth, South Africa

Coordinates: 33°57′25.98″S 25°35′27.57″E

Port Elizabeth tramway network
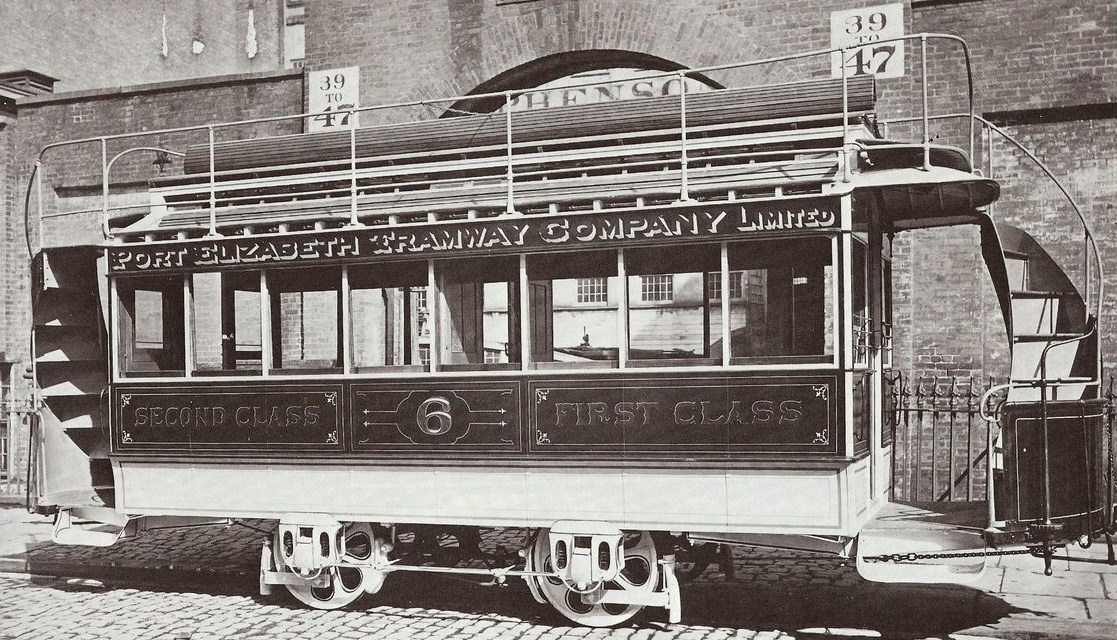
- Port Elizabeth horsecar no. 6, ca. 1880s.

Operation
- Locale: Port Elizabeth, South Africa

Statistics
Horsecar era: 14 May 1881–ca. June 1897
- Status: Closed
- Propulsion system: Horses
Electric tram era: 16 June 1897–17 December 1948
- Status: Closed
- Propulsion system: Electricity

The Port Elizabeth tramway network formed part of the public transport system in Port Elizabeth, South Africa, for nearly 70 years until the end of the 1940s.

== History ==
Opened in 14 May 1881, the Port Elizabeth tramway network was operated initially by horsecars. From 16 June 1897, the network was converted to electrical power. It was closed on 17 December 1948.

The tram rails are still visible in a few locations, notably outside the Port Elizabeth Golf course on the approach road to Cape Road.

== See also ==
- History of Gqeberha
- List of town tramway systems in Africa
- Rail transport in South Africa
