= Chief Maqoma Regiment =

South African Army reserve infantry regiment

Port Elizabeth Volunteer Rifle Corps Prince Alfred's Volunteer Guard Prince Alfred's Guard Chief Maqoma Regiment
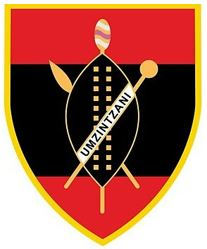
- SANDF Prince Alfreds Guards emblem
- Active: 19 September 1856 to present
- Country: South Africa
- Allegiance: Republic of South Africa; Republic of South Africa (1994–present)
- Branch: South African Army; South African Army (1994–present)
- Type: Light Infantry
- Size: One battalion
- Part of: South African Infantry Formation; Army Conventional Reserve
- Garrison/HQ: Gqeberha
- Mottos: Fidelis et Fortis (Faithful and Brave)
- Anniversaries: 19 September (Regimental Day)
- Battle honours: Gaika-Gcaleka 1877; Transkei 1877 - 1878; Umzintzani; Basutoland 1880 - 1881; Bechuanaland 1897; South Africa 1899 - 1902; Italy 1944 - 1945; Celleno; Florence; The Greve; Gothic Line; Po Valley

Insignia
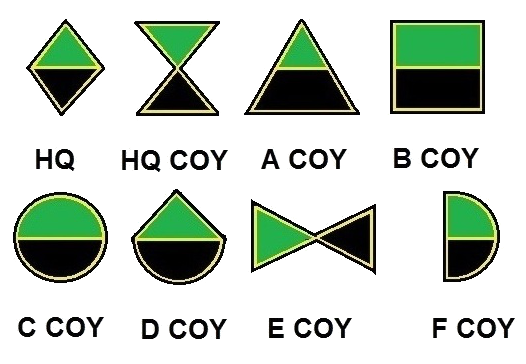
- Company level insignia

- SA Motorised Infantry beret bar circa 1992: SA Motorised Infantry beret bar
- Abbreviation: MR

The Chief Maqoma Regiment (formerly Prince Alfred's Guard) is a reserve infantry regiment of the South African Army. The regiment is located in the city of Gqeberha (formerly Port Elizabeth).

== History ==
=== Origin ===
Chief Maqoma Regiment was established on 19 September 1856 as the Port Elizabeth Volunteer Rifle Corps. In 1860 the title Prince Alfred's Guard was assumed unofficially (after Prince Alfred, Duke of Edinburgh) and on 11 July 1874 this name was officially sanctioned as Prince Alfred's Volunteer Guard. The name was later changed to Prince Alfred's Guard.

=== Xhosa Wars ===
The regiment first saw action on 2 December 1877, against the Gcaleka tribesmen in the Battle of Umzintzani during the Ninth Xhosa War. The next conflict that the unit participated in was the Basutoland Campaign of 1880 to 1881, during which a 500-metre bayonet charge by the regiment which led to the capture of the village of Lerotholi, an enemy village. The regiment also took part in the Bechuanaland Campaign of 1897.

=== Anglo Boer War ===
The regiment also served in the Second Anglo-Boer War of 1899 to 1902 - as mounted infantry - and took part in campaigns in the Orange Free State and the South African Republic.

=== World War One ===
Members of the unit volunteered for service in World War I, but there was dissension in the ranks after a long deployment on sentry duty in Cape Town. As a result, the contingent was disbanded and most of its members saw active service during the war in other South African units.

=== With the Union Defence Force ===
In 1913 the regiment was redesignated the 3rd Infantry Regiment (Prince Alfred's Guard) of the Active Citizen Force of the Union Defence Force, but regained its former name in 1934.

=== World War Two ===
During World War II, the regiment first served as link battalion for the 2nd Brigade, South African Infantry in North Africa, sending drafts of men to the fighting units, among which many went to the Field Force Battalion.

==== Armour ====
The PAG was subsequently converted to an armoured unit and saw further active service with the 11th South African Armoured Brigade, South African 6th Armoured Division in Italy as a tank unit. On 20 April 1944, equipped with Mark V Shermans and Stuarts, the regiment landed at Taranto in the heel of Italy. They were to reinforce the Allies still trapped at Anzio, and worn out by bitter fighting at Cassino and along the Gustav line.

=== With the SADF ===
==== Bush War and South West Africa (Namibia) ====
Re-equipped with Eland-90 armoured cars in the postwar period, the PAG also took part in several skirmishes during subsequent border conflicts in Angola and South-West Africa (Namibia).

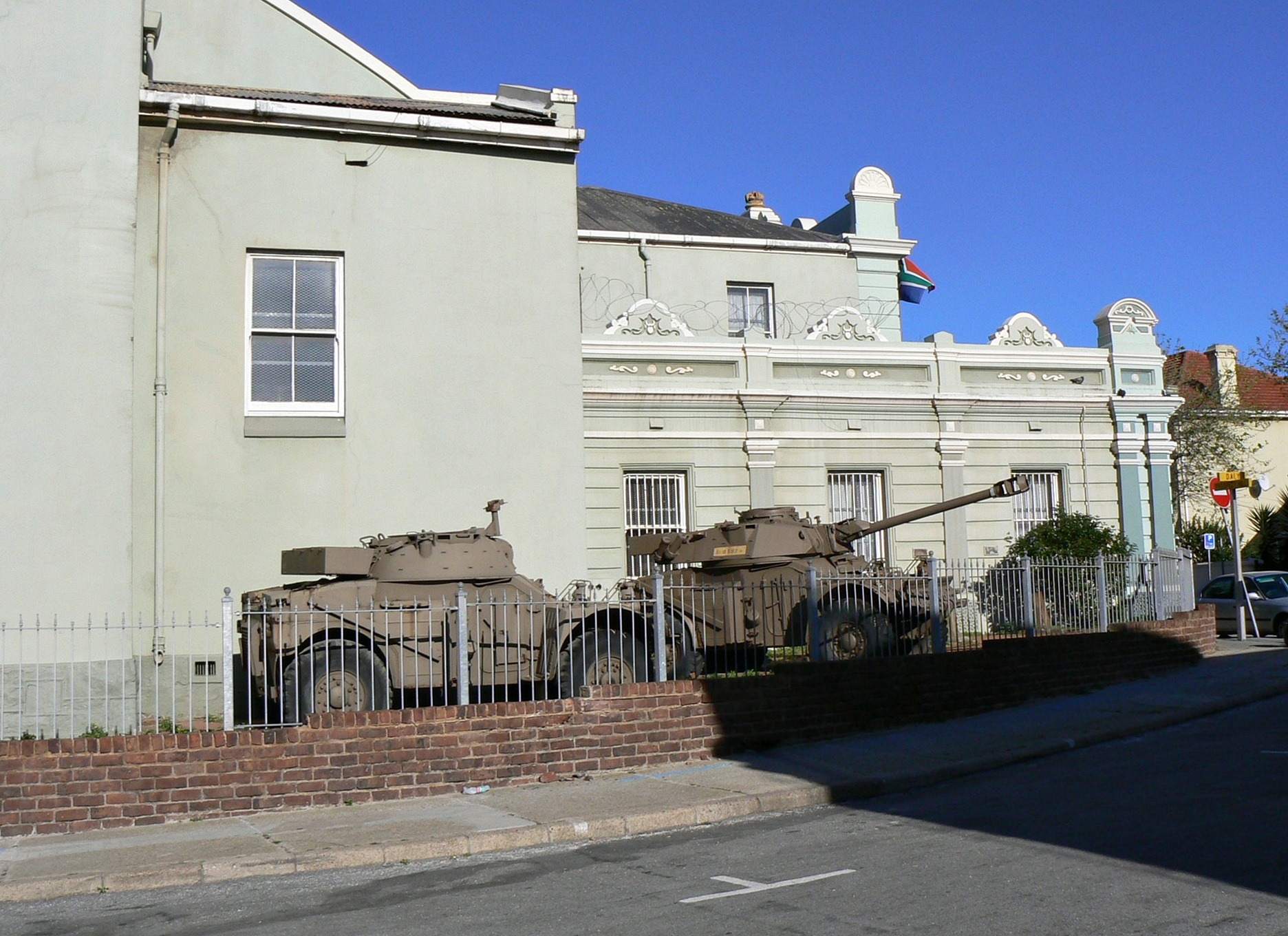
Eland 90 armored cars as ceremonial gate guards, Prince Alfred's Guard Drill Hall, Port Elizabeth, South Africa

=== Post 1994 and the SANDF ===
After 1994 the regiment continued in the South African National Defence Force as a South African Army Reserve Force infantry unit. Its members are trained to a large extent as air assault infantry.

In the draft South African Army Vision 2020 force design, the 2007 organograms published with Leon Engelbrecht's unpublished manuscript A Guide to the SANDF chart the unit (then still titled Prince Alfred's Guard) as an air assault battalion in the Special Operations Brigade, paired with 6 SAI, and also as motorised infantry under 6 Motorised Brigade (Eastern Cape) of the Motorised Division.

==== Name Change ====
In August 2019, 52 Reserve Force units had their names changed to reflect the diverse military history of South Africa. The Prince Alfred's Guard became the Chief Maqoma Regiment, and had 3 years to design and implement new regimental insignia.

== Regimental Symbols ==
- The Prince Alfred's Guard Museum in Port Elizabeth houses military exhibits in the Regiment's Victorian Drill Hall (built in 1880). It is a national monument and one of the finest surviving examples of its type.

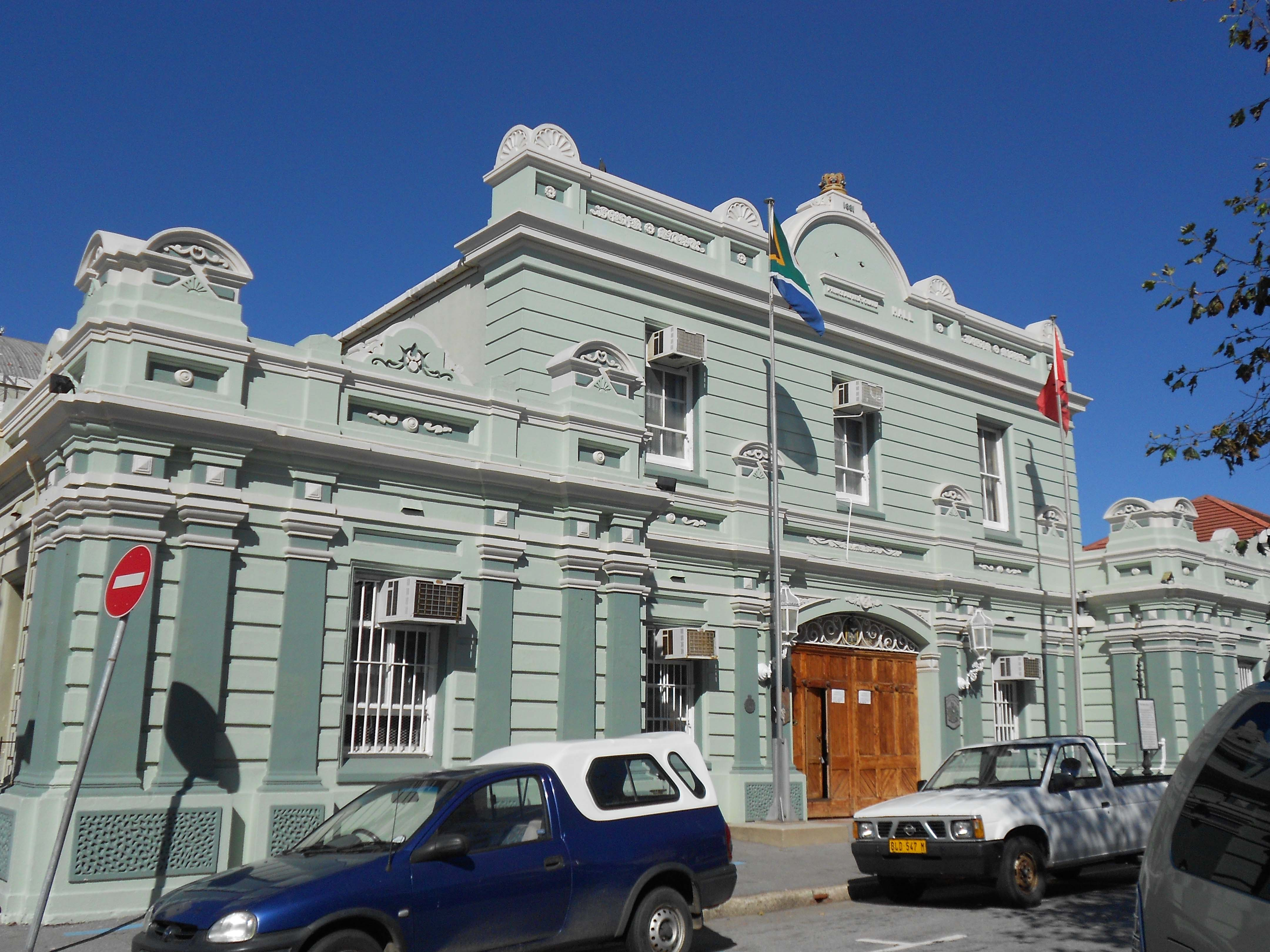
Prince Alfred's Guard Drill Hall

=== Previous Dress Insignia ===
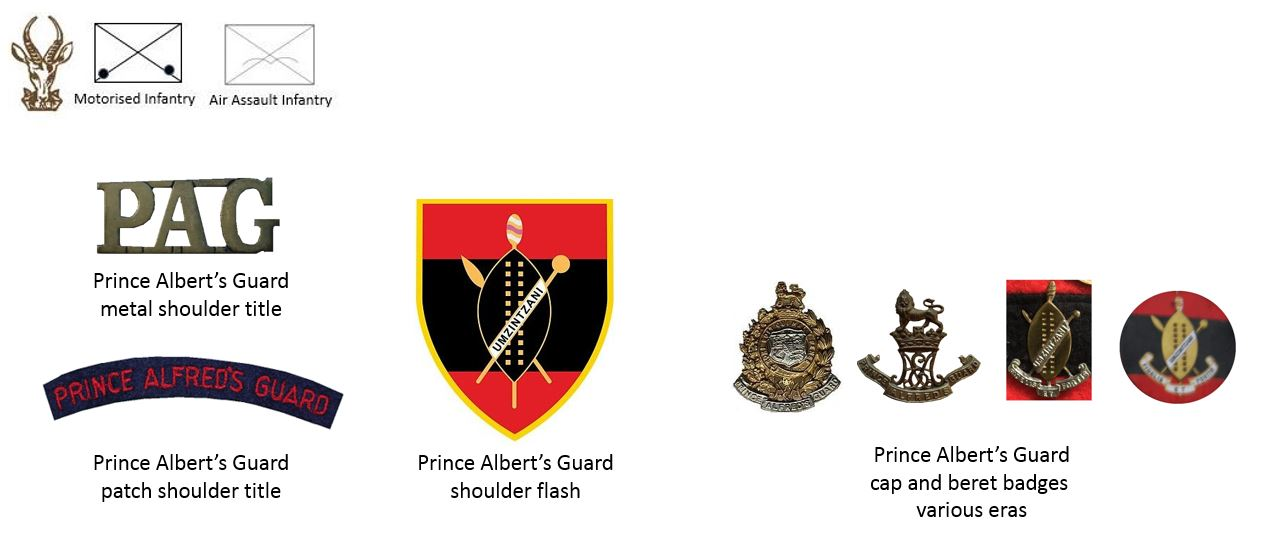
SADF era Prince Alfreds Guards insignia

=== Current Dress Insignia ===
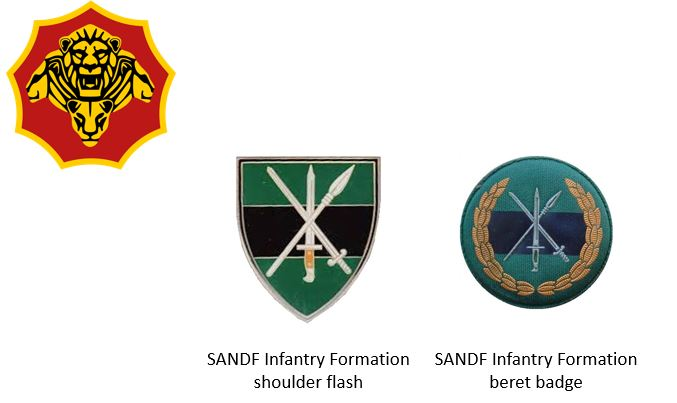
SANDF era Infantry Formation insignia

== Battle honours ==
Gaika Gcaleka 1877, Transkei 1877 - 1878, Umzintzani, Basutoland 1880 - 1881, Bechuanaland 1897, South Africa 1899 - 1902, Italy 1944 - 1945, Celleno, Florence, The Greve, Gothic Line, Po Valley

Battle Honours
Awarded to Prince Alfred's Guard
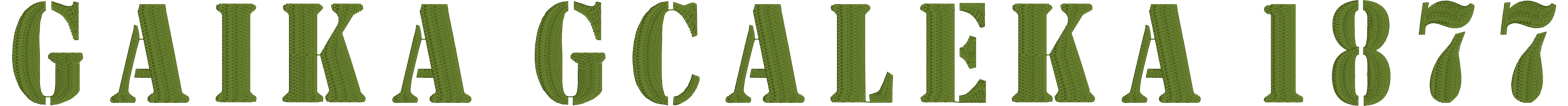
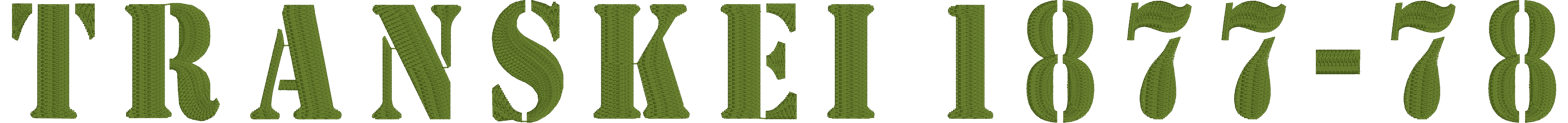
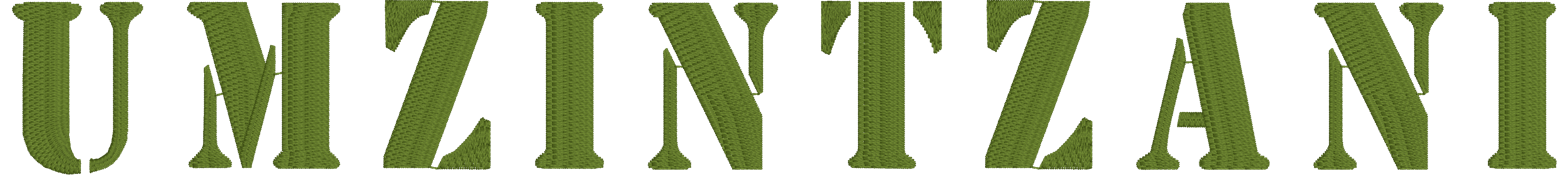
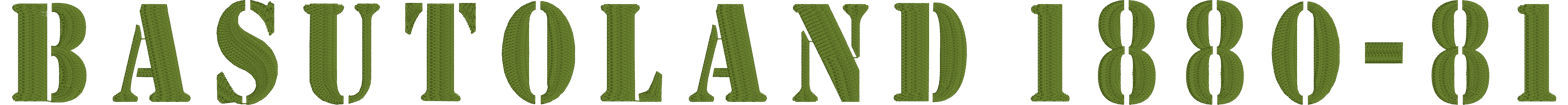
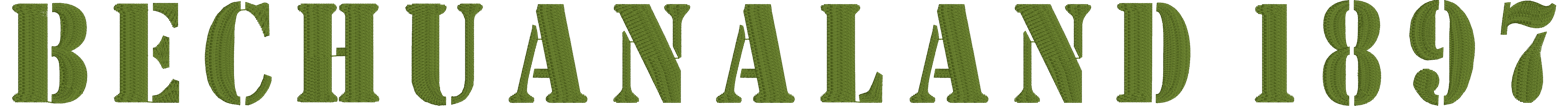
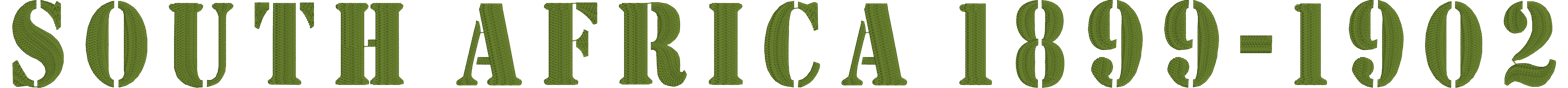
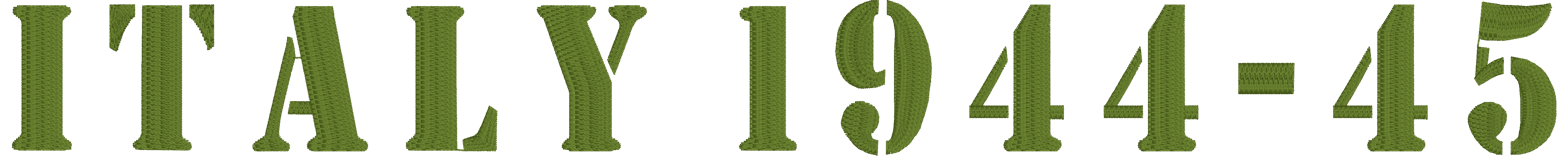
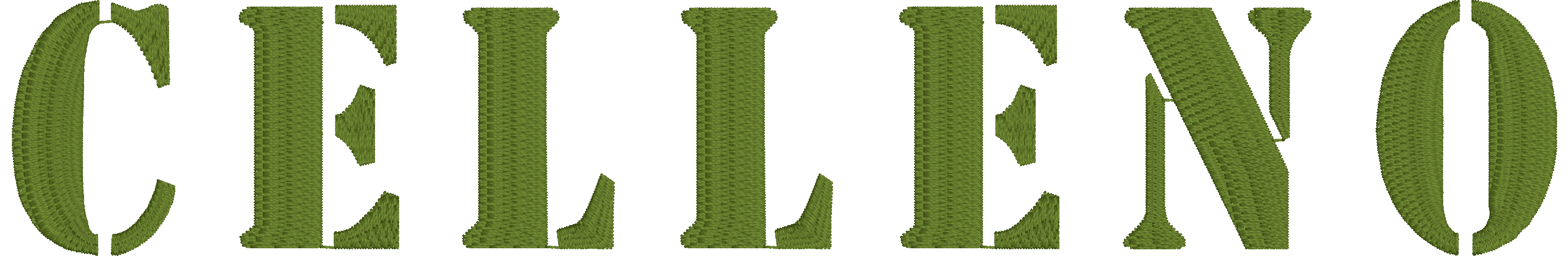
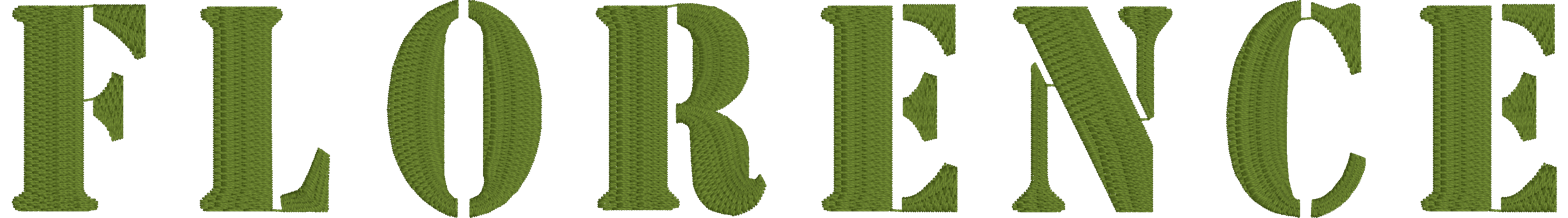
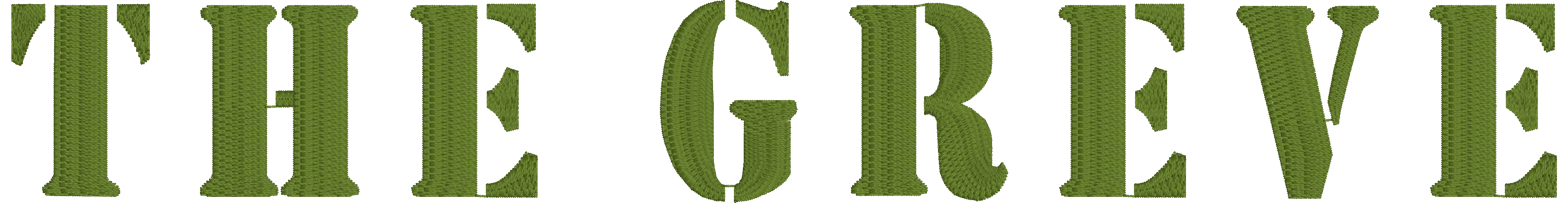
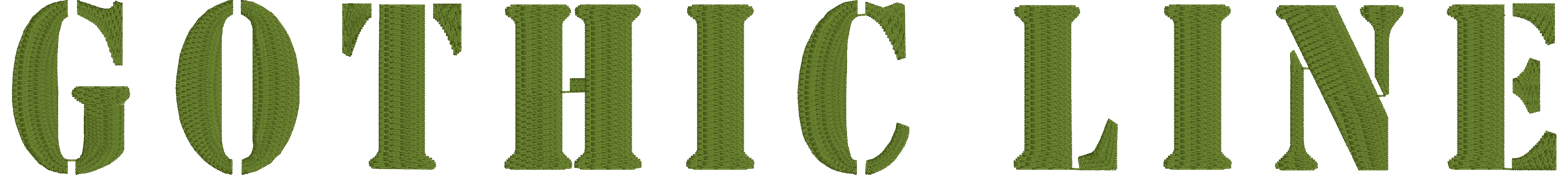
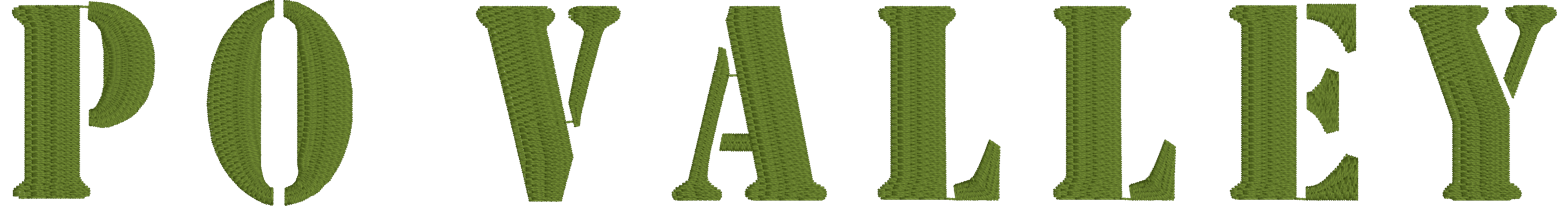

== Leadership ==
Leadership
From	Honorary Colonels	To	Ribbon
10 August 1928	Col T.A. Bromilow-Downing VD	27 August 1931	Colonial Auxiliary Forces Officers' Decoration VD
11 April 1947	Col J.R. Reis VD	19 April 1951	Colonial Auxiliary Forces Officers' Decoration VD
29 December 1954	Col W.E. Hawkins ED	nd	Efficiency Decoration (South Africa) ED
From	Commanding Officers	To	Ribbon
1856	Col J.M. Hill	1857	
1857	Col A.J. Clairmonte	1857	
nd	Col A. Ogilvie	1860	
1861	Col A.C. Wylde	1865	
1865	Capt W. Fleming	1865	
1874	Col A.C. Wylde	1876	
1876	Maj G.R. Deare	1888	
1888	Lt Col G. Gordon	1898	
1898	Maj G.C. Clark CMG,VD	1899	Order of St Michael and St George CMG Colonial Auxiliary Forces Officers' Decoration VD
1899	Lt Col H.W. Court VD	10 April 1915	Colonial Auxiliary Forces Officers' Decoration VD
10 April 1915	Lt Col J.N. Neylan DSO	1 November 1915	Distinguished Service Order DSO
1 November 1915	Lt Col A.P.J. Wares VD	31 May 1925	Colonial Auxiliary Forces Officers' Decoration VD
1 June 1925	Lt Col Whitehead DSO	6 January 1926	Distinguished Service Order DSO
6 January 1916	Lt Col F.L.A. Buchanan MC,VD	30 June 1930	Military Cross MC Colonial Auxiliary Forces Officers' Decoration VD
1 July 1935	Lt Col J.L. Reis VD	13 September 1942	Colonial Auxiliary Forces Officers' Decoration VD
14 September	Lt Col H.A. Olsen DSO,ED	11 December 1945	Distinguished Service Order DSO Efficiency Decoration (South Africa) ED
5 February 1946	Lt Col W.E. Hawkins ED	30 June 1952	Efficiency Decoration (South Africa) ED
1 July 1952	Cmdt G.M. Human	30 April 1955	
1 May 1955	Cmdt J.N. Erasmus JCD	1 January 1959	John Chard Decoration JCD
1 January 1959	Cmdt I.F. Nel SM,JCD	nd	Southern Cross Medal SM John Chard Decoration JCD
From	Regimental Sergeants Major	To	Ribbon
	No known incumbents		

== Alliances ==
- United Kingdom - The Royal Highland Fusiliers

== See also ==
- Prince Alfred's Guard Memorial
- Donkin Heritage Trail

== Books ==
- Perridge, Frank (1939). HISTORY OF THE PRINCE ALBERT'S GUARD. Port Elizabeth: E.H. Walton.
