= St. Augustine's Cathedral, Gqeberha =

St. Augustine's Cathedral
- St. Augustine's Cathedral
- 33°57′46″S 25°37′21″E
- Location: Gqeberha
- Country: South Africa
- Denomination: Roman Catholic Church

St. Augustine's Cathedral, also called the Catholic Cathedral of Port Elizabeth, is a Roman Catholic cathedral located on Prospect Hill in the city of Gqeberha, part of the Eastern Cape Province on the coast of the African country of South Africa.

The first stone of the present Gothic structure was placed in 1861 under the impulse of Father Thomas Murphy; the church was finished and consecrated in 1866.

The congregation follows the Roman or Latin rite, and the cathedral is the mother church of the diocese of Port Elizabeth (Dioecesis Portus Elizabethensis), which obtained its current name in 1939 and received the status of diocese in 1951 through the bull "Supreme Nobis" of pope Pius XII.

It is under the pastoral responsibility of Bishop Vincent Mduduzi Zungu.

== See also ==
- Roman Catholicism in South Africa
- St. Mary's Cathedral, Cape Town
