= 1908 Port Elizabeth flood =

South African flood

1908 Port Elizabeth floods
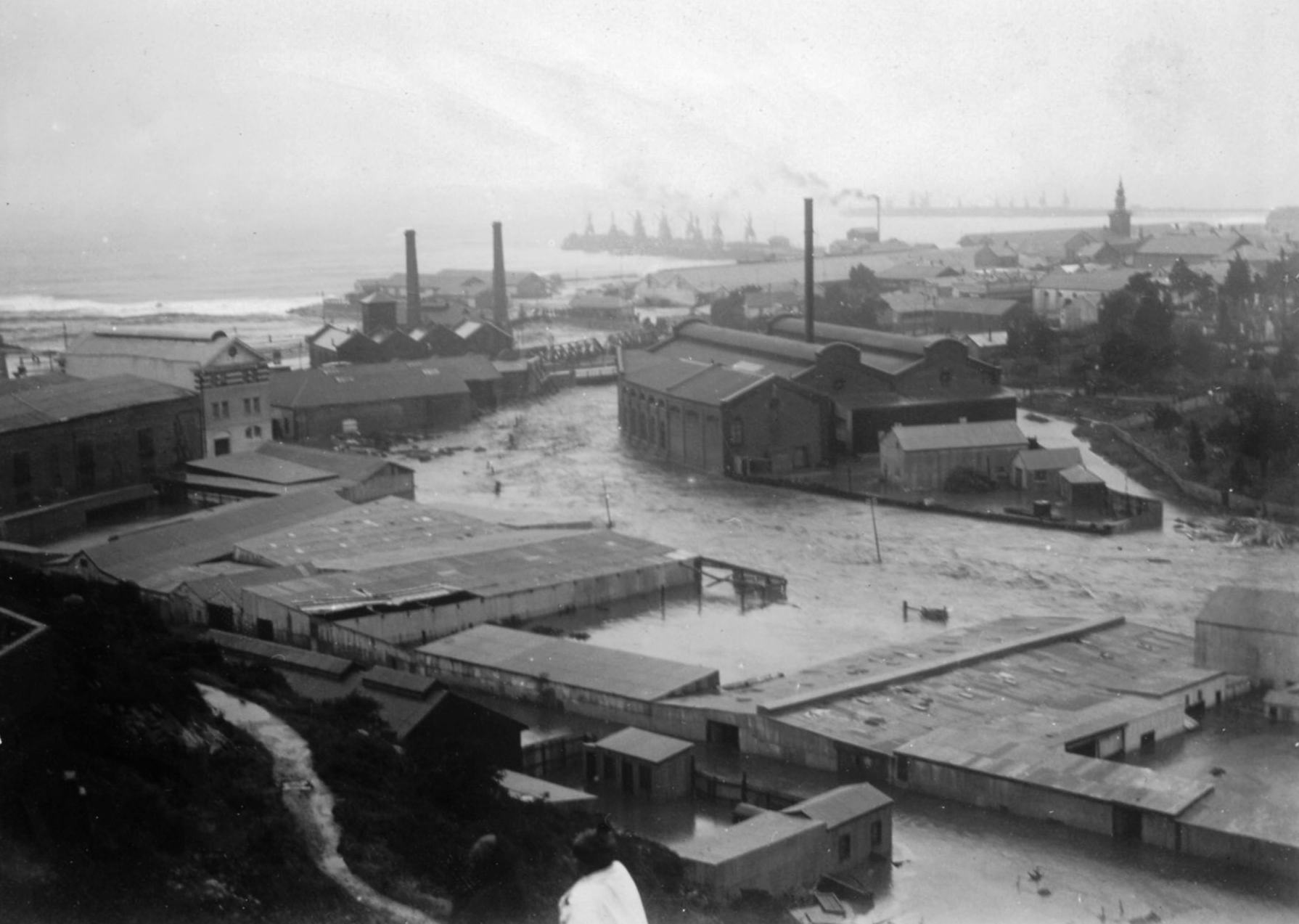
- Flooded Lower Valley Road near the Old Tramways Building, Port Elizabeth
- Date: 16 November 1908 – 17 November 1908
- Location: Port Elizabeth, Cape Colony (now in South Africa)
- Cause: Heavy rains
- Deaths: Unknown
- Property damage: £250,000 (over £38 million in 2023)

The 1908 Port Elizabeth flood was a devastating flood that occurred on 16 November 1908 in Port Elizabeth, caused by a heavy downpour typical of the coastal areas in South Africa, that led the Baaken's River to come down in flood.

The flood caused over £250,000 in damage, equivalent to £38 million in 2023, but there were no reports of fatalities.

== Damage ==
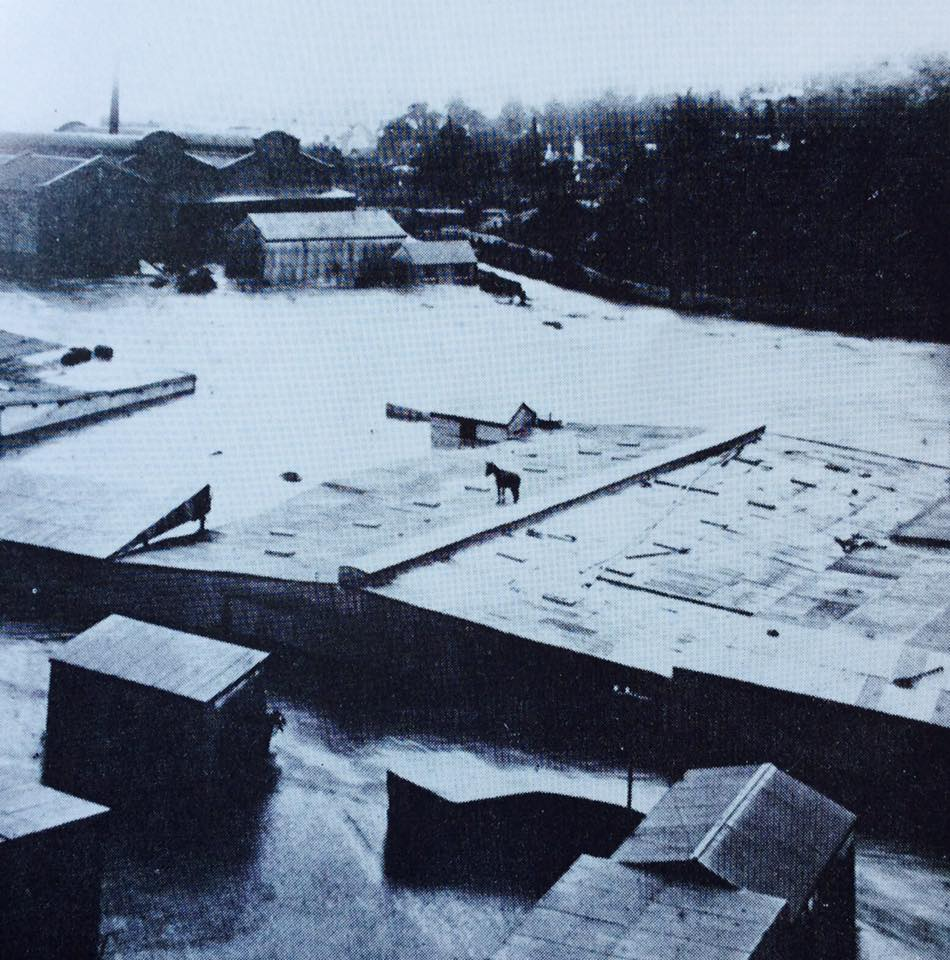
The famous mule on a shed roof during the flooding.

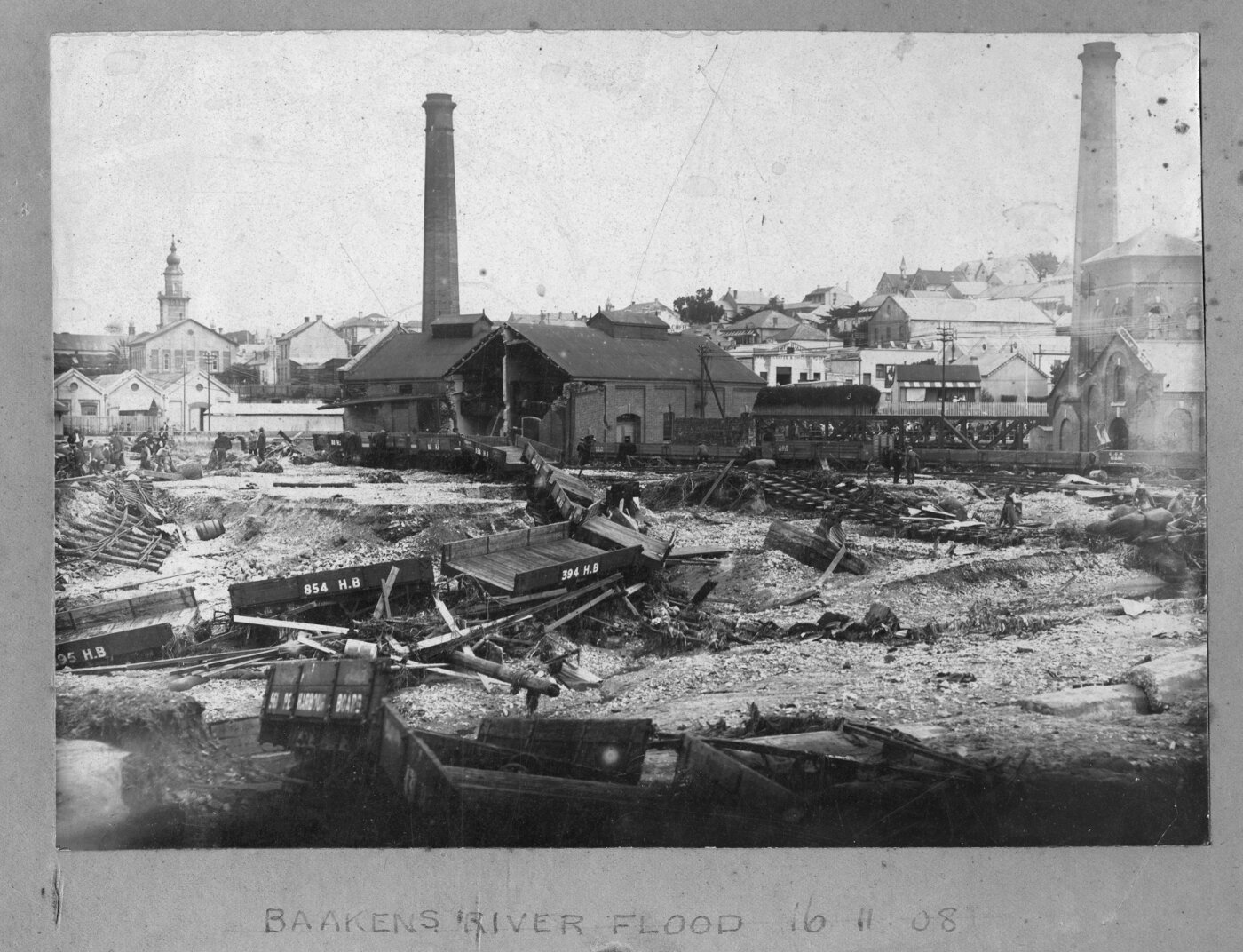
Damaged stream mills and bridges along the Lower Valley Rd.

The damage in Port Elizabeth was primarily due to the inadequate capacity of Baaken's River to handle the intense rainfall, despite its relatively small catchment area. Although the stream's catchment area covered only about 10 to 15 miles with a width of 3 to 4 miles, much of the destruction occurred in "reclaimed" land. The city experienced a rainfall of 3.25 inches, which alone was insufficient to explain the rapid transformation of a small stream into a 200-yard-wide and 20 to 30-feet-deep raging torrent within two hours. The floods even overcame a 150-feet-wide and 40 to 50-feet-deep gorge. The sudden rise of water gave people little time to escape, and some had to swim to safety, but a mule was fortunate enough to be washed onto the roof of the municipal stables while others perished. The water level rose six feet in just five minutes, and debris from an upper bridge obstructed the main bridge, diverting even more water through the town. The floodwaters stripped the maize fields down to the ploughed depth, and all trees and bushes were swept away for about a mile along the river.

The flood caused significant destruction as it surged through the town, particularly in the produce section. The main stream followed Commerce Street, cutting off the Customs House located 250 yards from the river. Numerous buildings collapsed and extensive property damage occurred, with entire stores demolished and their contents, including produce and merchandise, scattered for miles along the North End Beach. The Harbour Board plant and the Port Elizabeth Electric Tramway power station also suffered serious damage.

The flood washed away the railway bridge at the Creek, causing disruption to the train service between Zwartkops and the town. However, repair crews swiftly worked to establish a system where trains ran to each side of the break, allowing passengers to transfer between them.

The watershed of the Papenkuils River was also affected, causing damage in the Cradock Place area. The residents of Cradockstown faced devastating destruction as the heavy rainfall lasted for four hours almost continuously, causing immense damage to previously fertile agricultural lands. The powerful water swept away thousands of bundles of forage and wood that had been prepared over the past two weeks, as well as mature longstanding oak trees on the property were uprooted and carried a significant distance away.

== Aftermath ==
In September 1909, individuals impacted by the flood damage took legal action against the Council and the Commissioner of Public Works. On 13 September, the Circuit Court began hearing the case. The plaintiffs were merchants who had incurred losses in the flood, claimed that the low bridge and raised roadway caused insufficient opening for floodwaters, and buildings should never have been allowed on the flood plain. The Council was found not liable initially, but the merchants appealed the decision, and brought the case known as "Tilbrook & Bayley v. the Town Council of Port Elizabeth and the Colonial Government." The plaintiffs claimed that the Town Council's actions caused the floodwaters to be diverted into buildings where their goods were stored. The alleged wrongful and negligent acts included reclaiming parts of the river bed, constructing a roadway across the river with an inadequate opening for floodwater discharge, and building a low-height bridge with oblique supports.

On 9 March 1910, the Supreme Court delivered its judgment on the case. The Court determined that even if a lagoon still existed, it would not have significantly affected the flood's course, as it was the most severe flood on record. Regarding the bridge, the Court ruled that public bodies were not responsible for every possible emergency and that the bridge was designed appropriately based on foreseeable circumstances. The appeal was dismissed, and the plaintiffs were required to pay the costs.

Following the litigation, the Port Elizabeth Municipality sought advice from a conference of engineers, who provided their opinions on 27 May 1910. The conference, unable to determine the original river channel conditions, recommended a 100-feet wide channel to accommodate any reasonable flood. They presented three alternative schemes, with the municipality ultimately adopting the "BB" scheme, proposing a channel length of approximately 1,600 feet.
