= Fort Frederick, Eastern Cape =

Fort in South Africa

Fort Frederick
- Port Elizabeth, South Africa
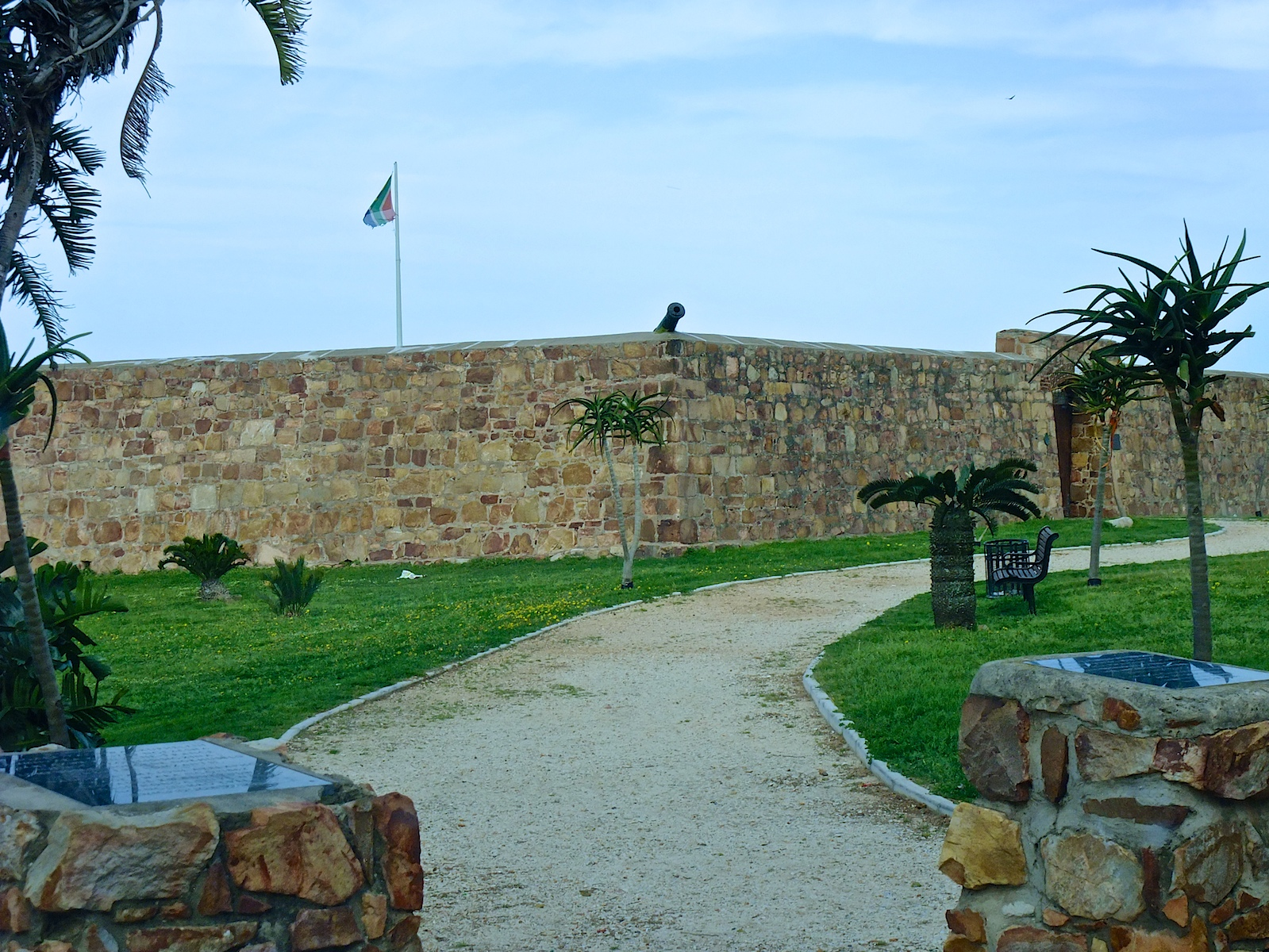
- The fort situated along Athol Fugard Terrace

Site information
- Type: Mortared construction
- Controlled by: South Africa
- Open to the public: Yes
- Condition: Intact

Location
- Location within Eastern Cape Location within South Africa
- Coordinates: 33.966588°S 25.621436°E
- Height: 2 floors, wooden blockhouse burned down

Site history
- Built: 1799; 227 years ago
- Materials: Local stone and wood
- Events: Napoleonic Wars, Invasion of the Cape Colony (1795), British rule in South Africa, 1820 Settlers

Garrison information
- Past commanders: Captain Francis Evatt (1817–1847)
- Occupants: British Forces

Fort Frederick in Gqeberha, South Africa, was built in 1799 in order to stop the French from conquering the Cape Colony during the Napoleonic Wars and played a vital role in establishing British rule in South Africa in combination with the Battle of Blaauwberg. The fort has never fired a shot from its guns.

== History ==
Fort Frederick was built in 1799 on a natural vantage point overlooking the strategic Algoa Bay. Named after Frederick, Duke of York and Albany, commander-in-chief of the British Army, it was built by troops sent to Algoa Bay to prevent a possible landing of French troops, under Napoleon to assist the Graaff-Reinet rebels during the Napoleonic Wars, which event is often regarded to be the beginning of the British rule in the Cape Colony.

The "landing with fresh water", as Algoa Bay was referred to, sits at the mouth of the Baakens River, the bay stretches from the Baakens River to the outskirts of modern-day Gqeberha. When the 1820 Settlers arrived in Port Elizabeth, the fort was already well-established.

The fort consists of the powder magazine and the blockhouse, which has lost its timber upper storey. Its original armaments consisted of two 8-pounder guns and one 5.5 inch Howitzer. The museum collection now also contains a varied selection of muzzle-loaders dating from the later part of the eighteenth century.

Captain Francis Evatt, Commandant of Fort Frederick between 1817 and 1847 is buried next to the fort. Captain Evatt played an important role in overseeing the arrivals of the Settlers in 1820.

Port Elizabeth sprang up around the fort.

== Tourism ==
Opening times are daily, from sunrise to sunset and the admission is free. The fort is reportedly haunted by the ghosts of a Shakespeare play.

== Gallery ==
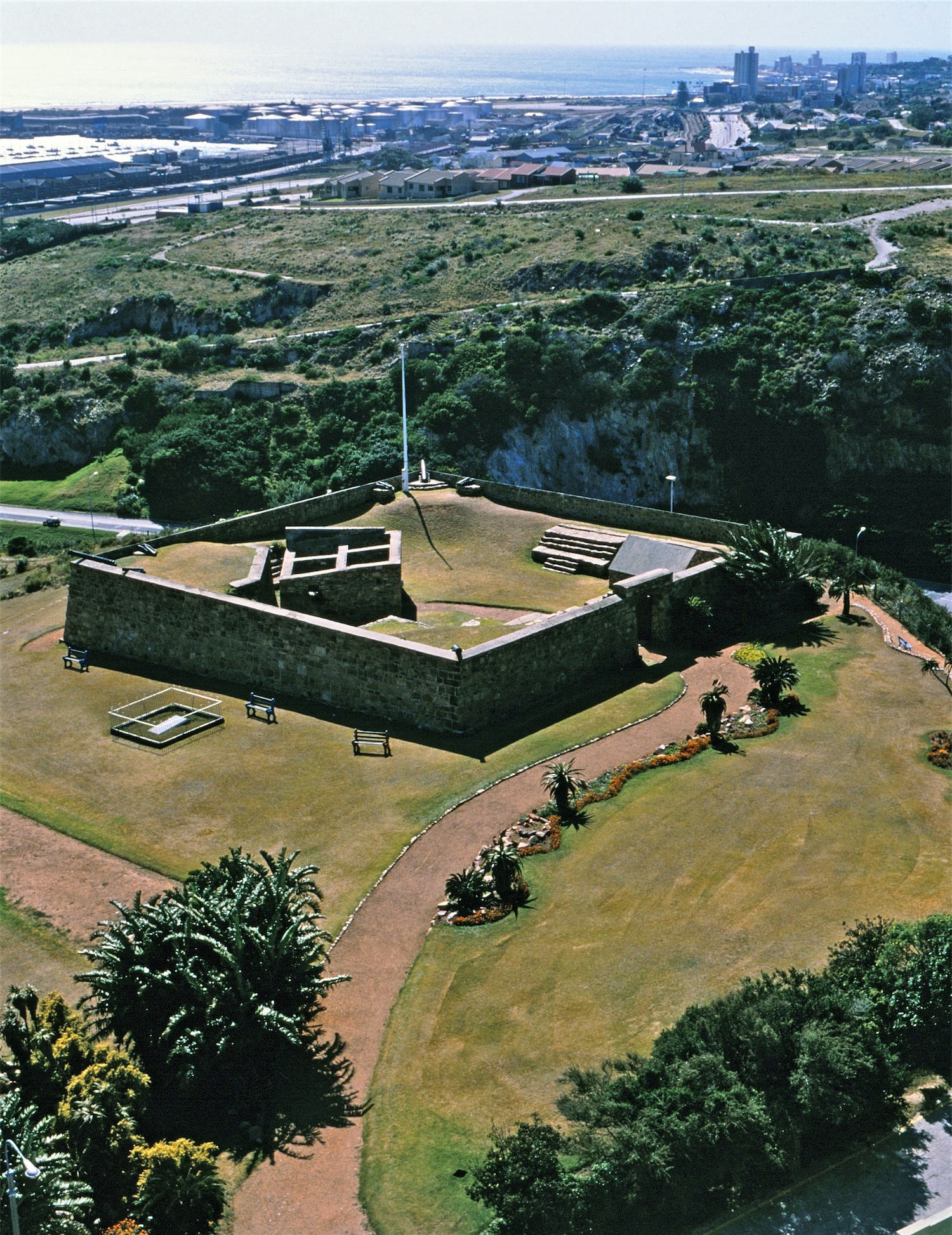
Aerial view of the fort.

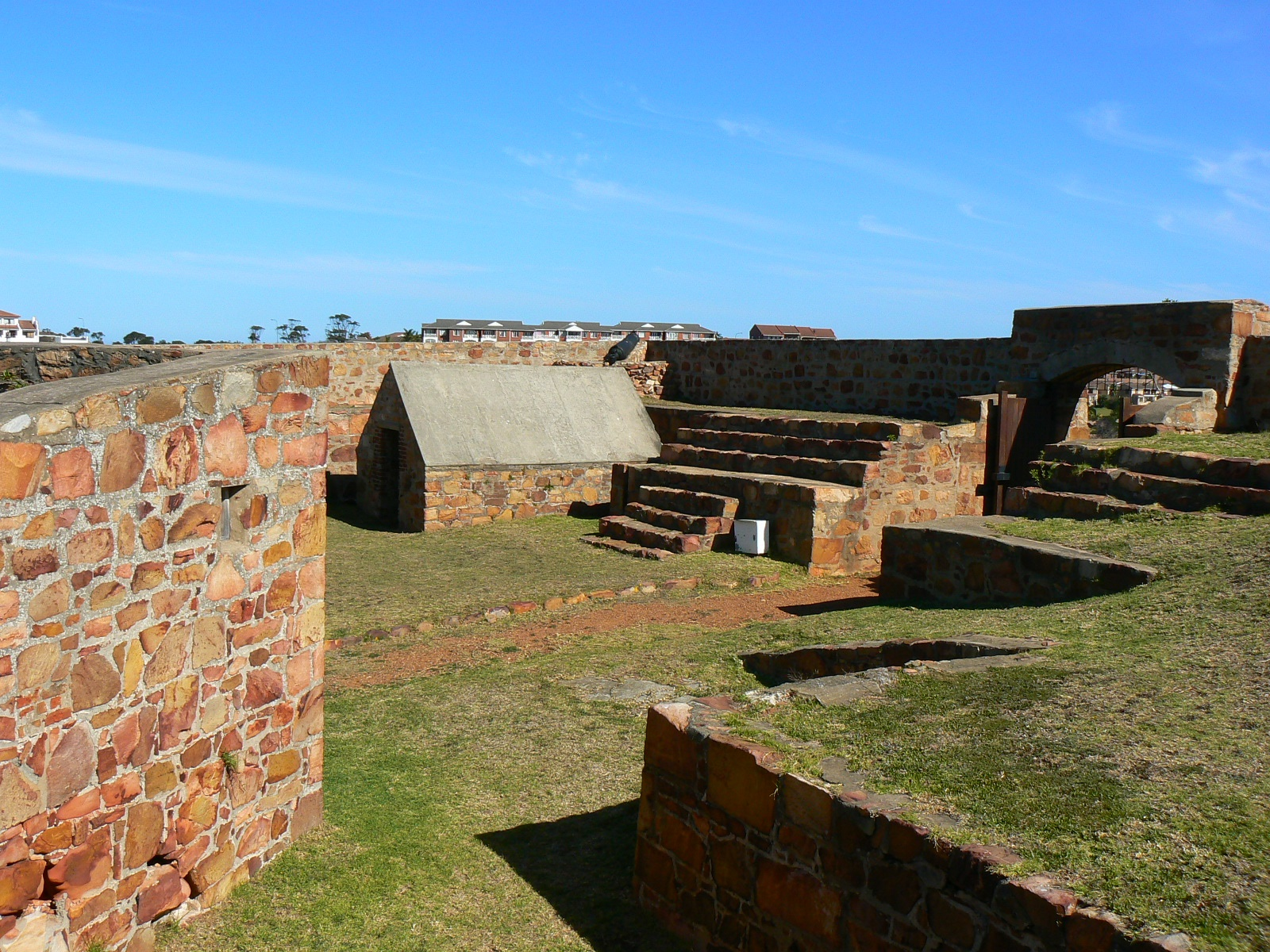
Inside the fort, soldiers house on left and ammunition store in the centre.

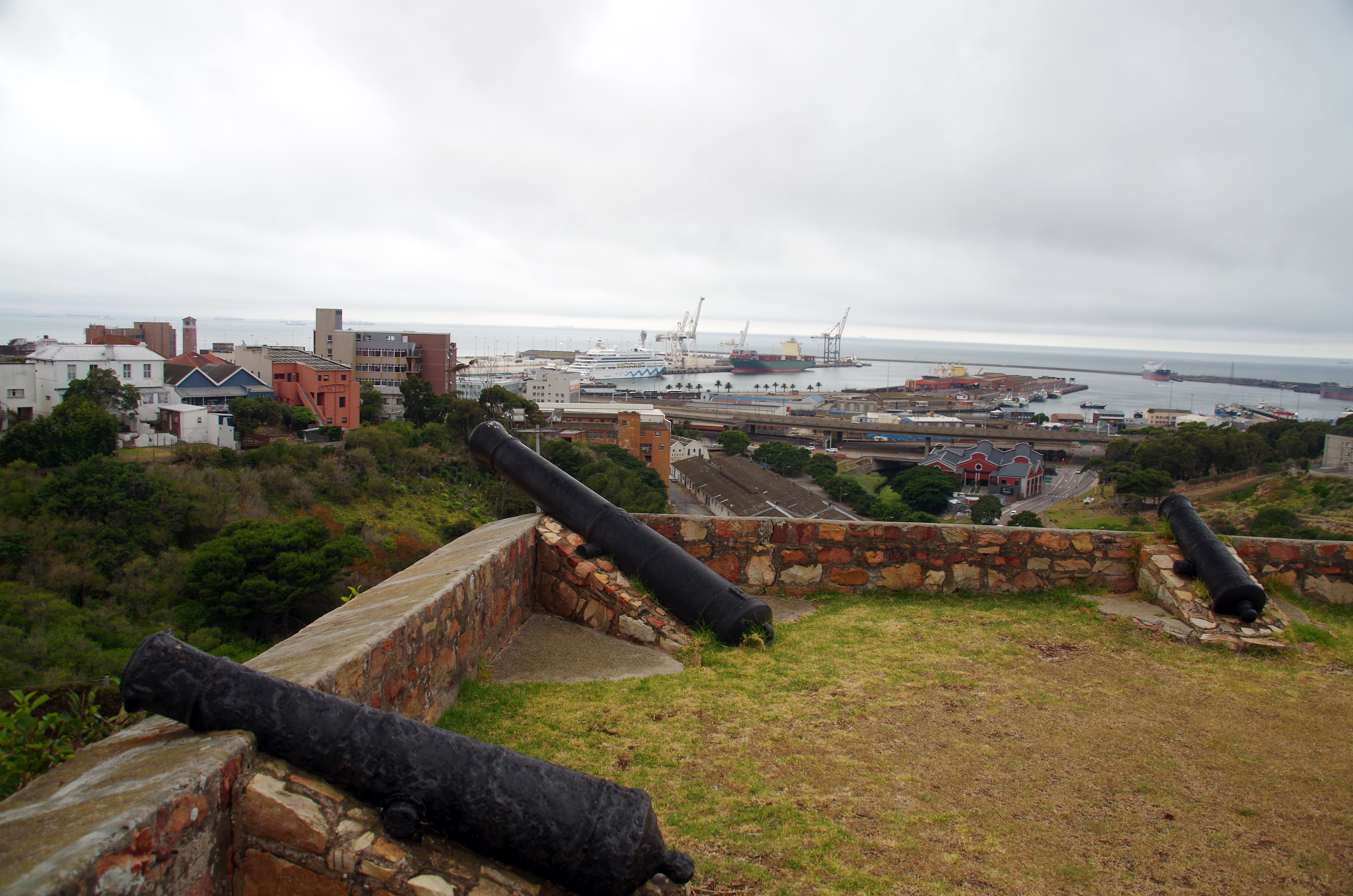
Canons aimed at the harbour.

== See also ==
- List of Castles and Fortifications in South Africa
- Port Elizabeth
- Cape colony
- Battle of Blaauwberg
- Invasion of the Cape Colony (1795)
- British rule in South Africa
