= St George's Park, Gqeberha =

Park in Port Elizabeth, South Africa

St George's Park
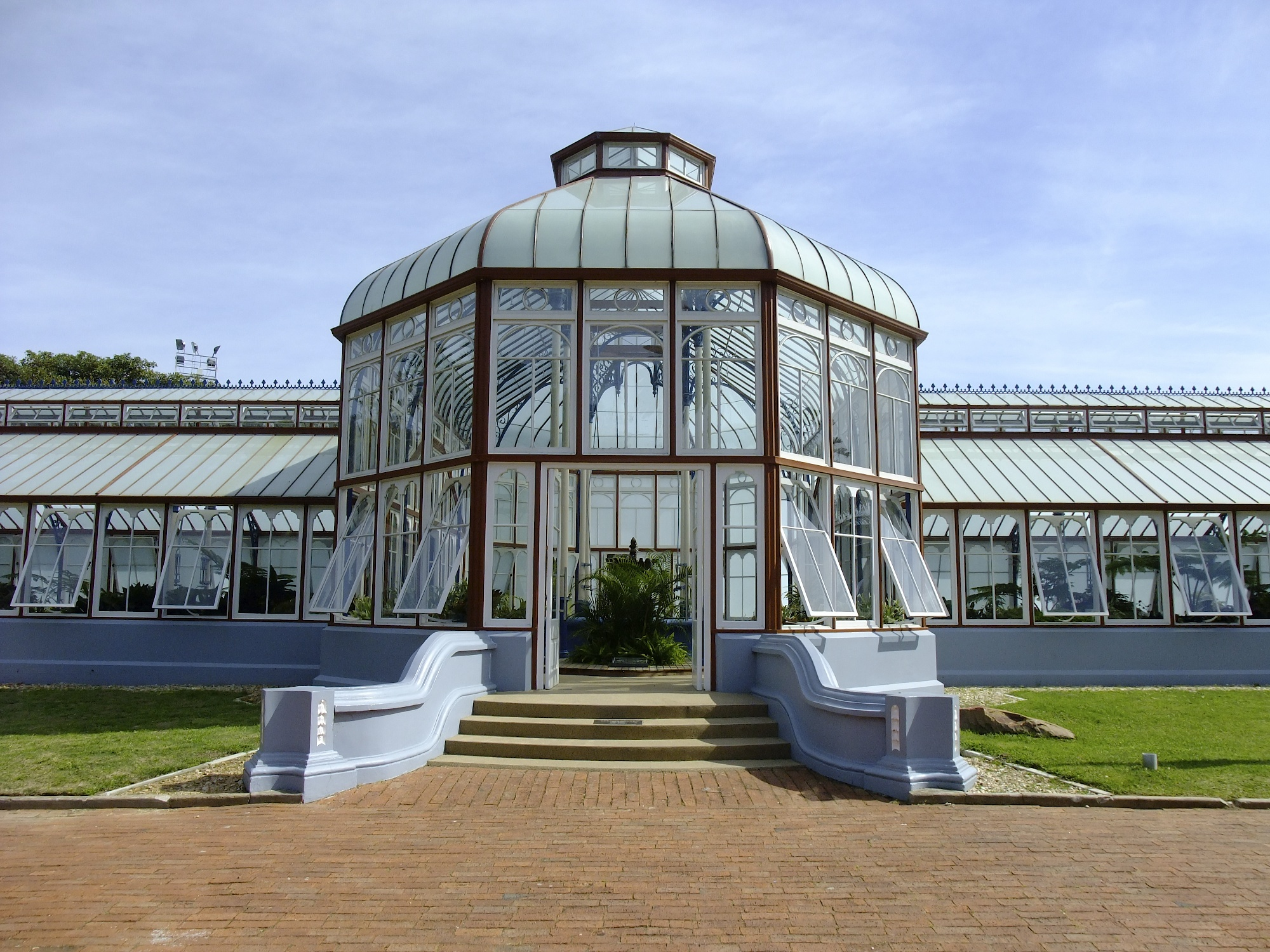
- The Pearson Conservatory in the park.
- Type: Urban park
- Location: Gqeberha
- Coordinates: 33.96586°S 25.60741°E
- Established: 1859; 166 years ago

St George's Park (est. 1859) is a multi-use park in Gqeberha, South Africa. The park is the oldest park in Gqeberha and most commonly associated with the St George's Oval cricket grounds located within the park.

== Features ==
The Port Elizabeth Bowling Green Club, the oldest lawn bowling club in South Africa, has been located in the park since its founding in 1882. The collection of the Nelson Mandela Metropolitan Art Museum, formerly the King George VI Art Gallery, is housed in two buildings that frame the entrance to the park. The St George's Park Swimming Baths complex comprises an Olympic sized swimming pool with a diving area. However, the pool has not been used since 2018. The complex also contains the Master Harold tearoom which was used as the setting for the apartheid era play "Master Harold"...and the Boys by Athol Fugard. The Mannville Open Air Theatre, constructed in 1971, is used as part of the annual Port Elizabeth Shakespearean Festival. The Sea Scouts facility, Sea Scouts Hall, is the former home of the 72nd Air School, a Second World War Women's Auxiliary Air Force basic training school. The Port Elizabeth Lawn Tennis Club, Prince Alfred's Guard Memorial, Pearson Conservatory and the Port Elizabeth Cenotaph are other prominent features of the park.
