= Gqeberha =

South African port city

Gqeberha: iBhayi (Xhosa); iBhayi (Zulu); Baye (Sotho); Port Elizabeth
- City
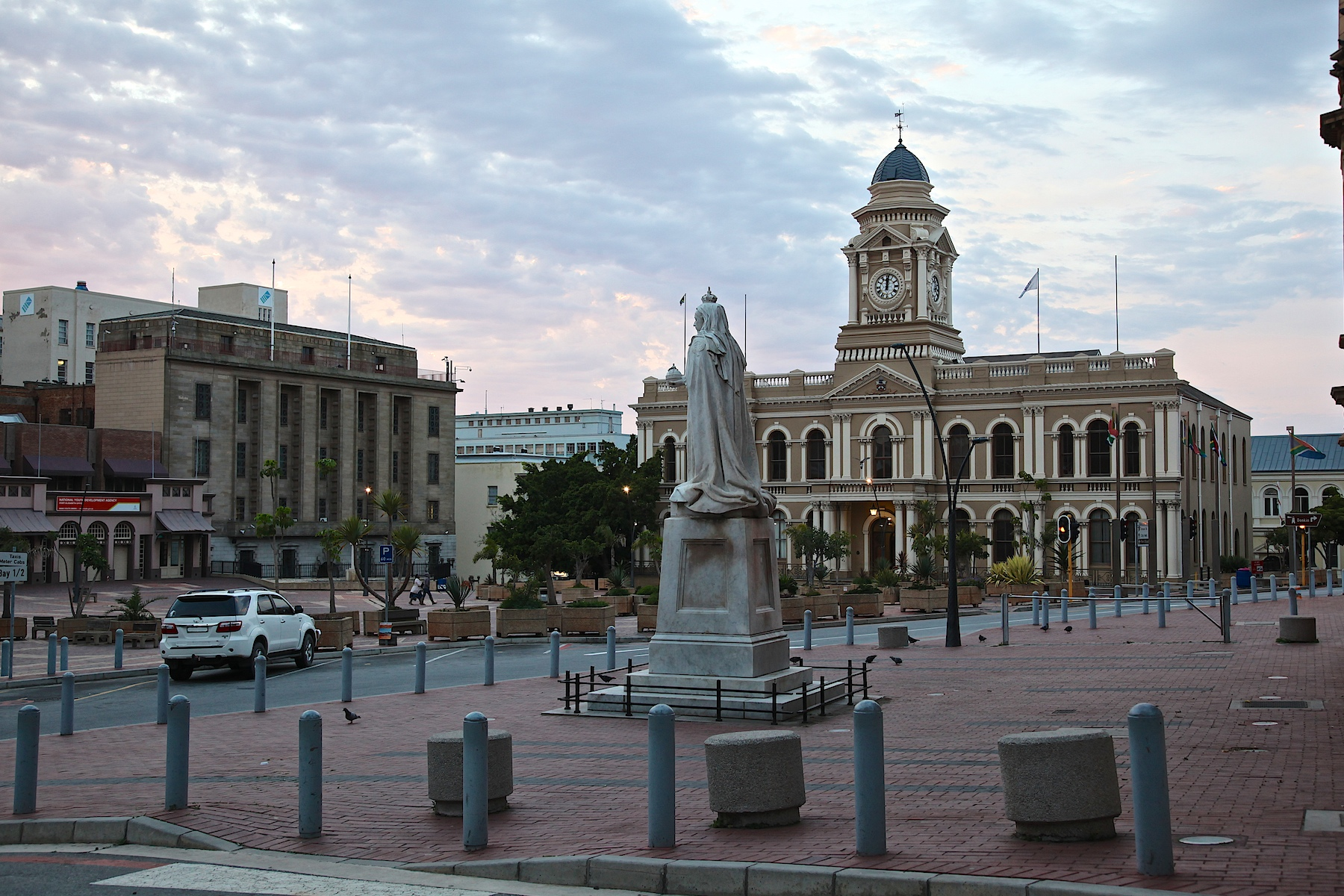
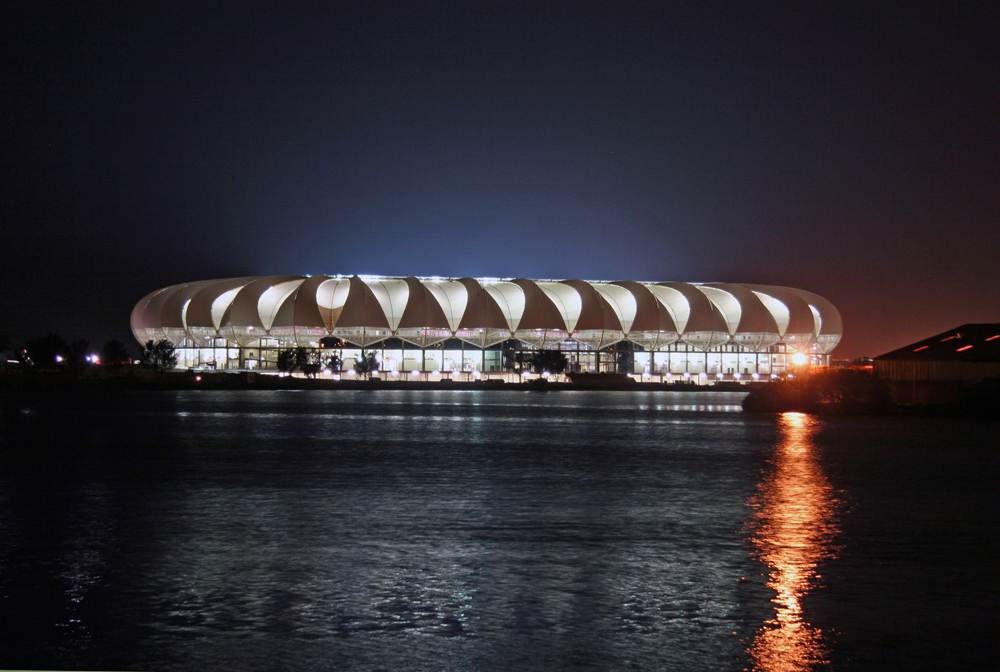
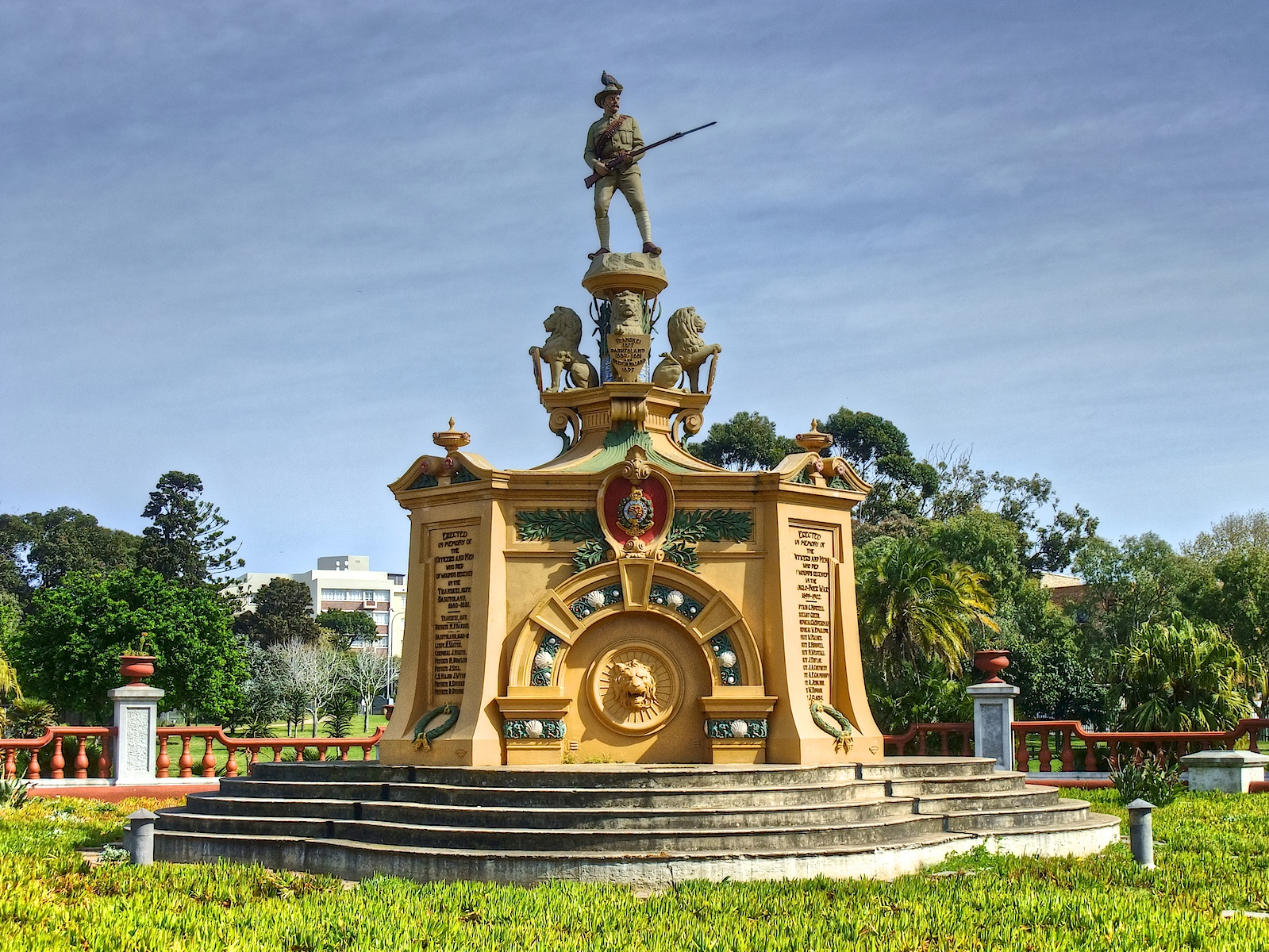
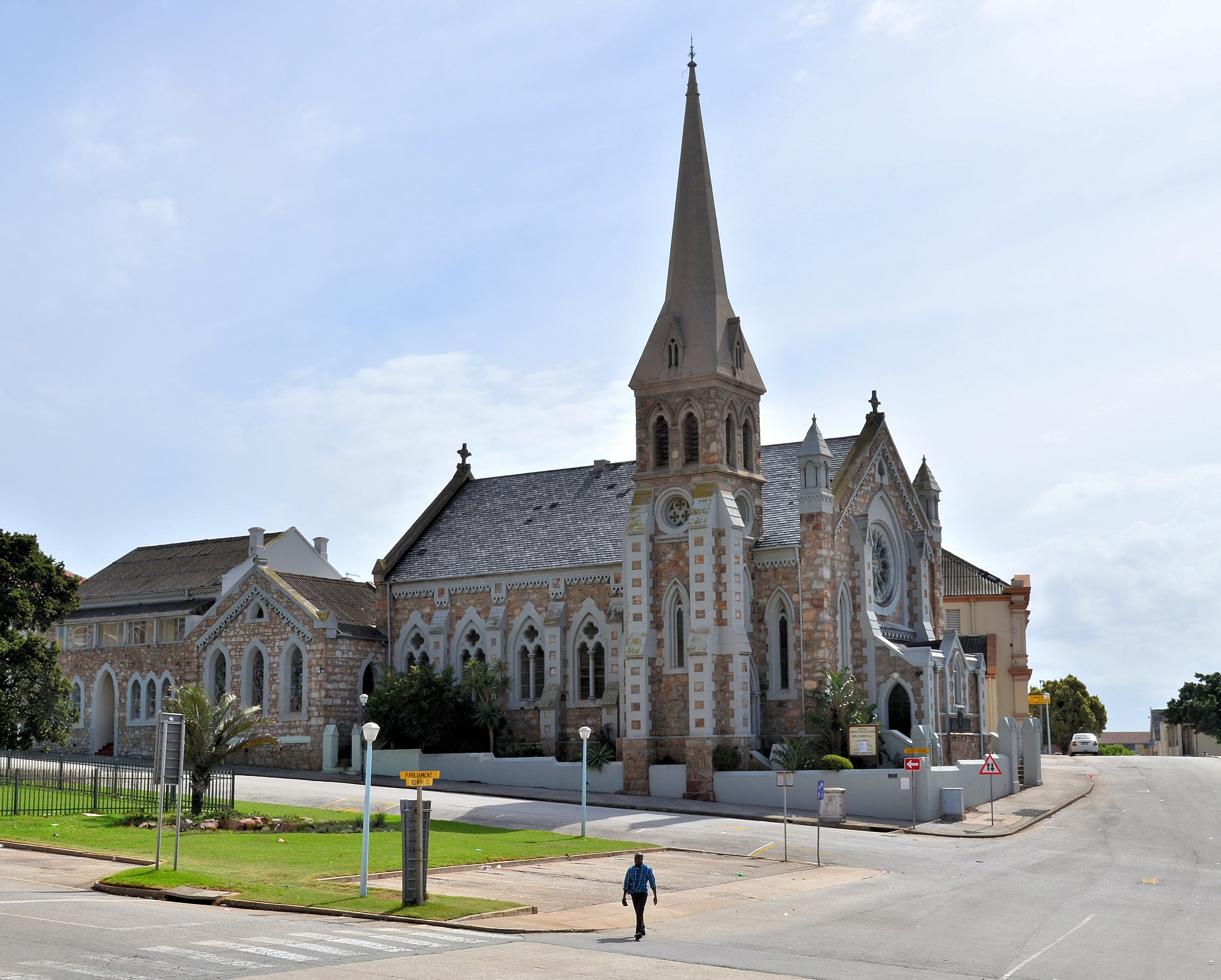
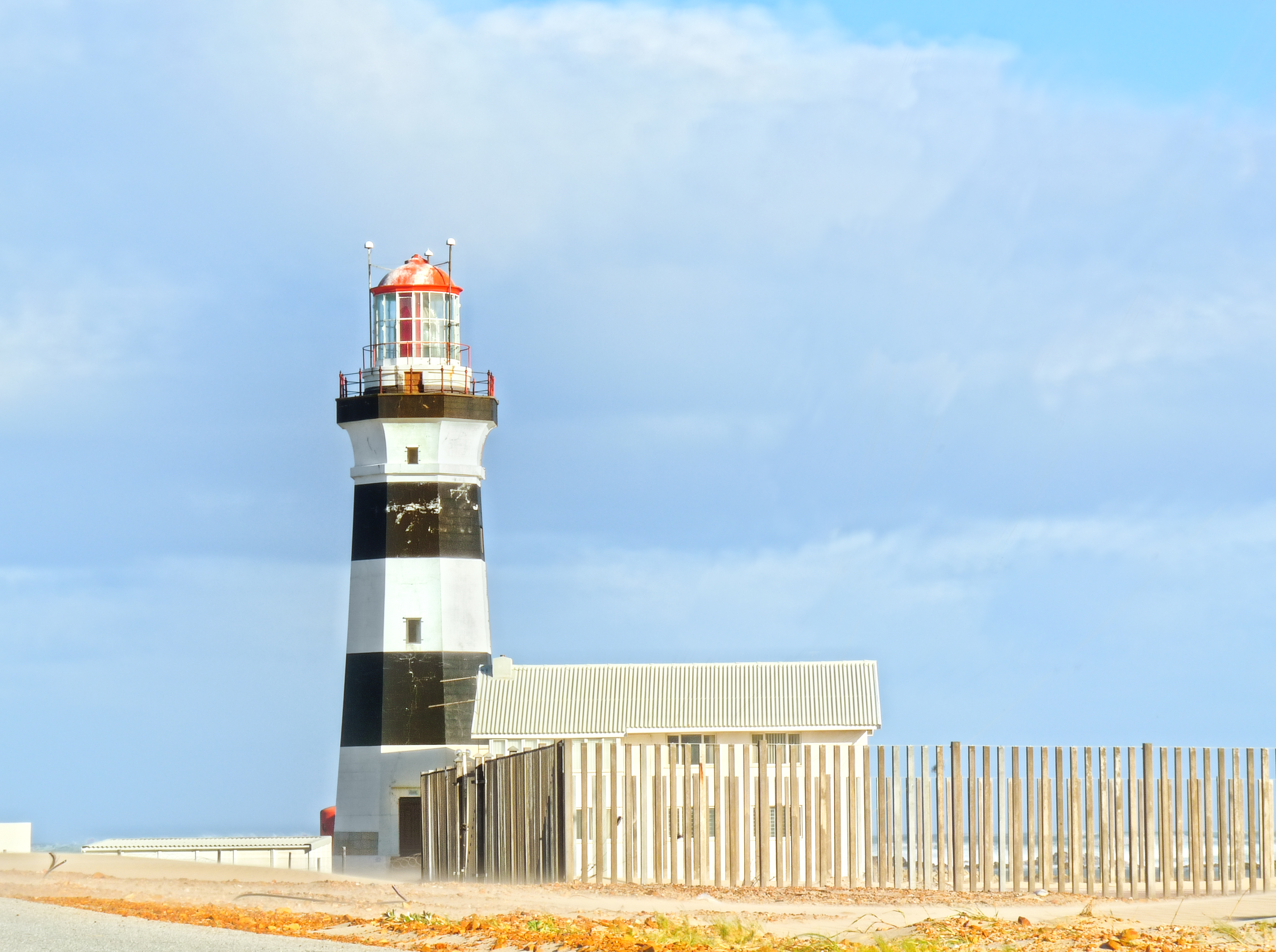
- City Hall Nelson Mandela Bay Stadium Prince Alfred's Guard Memorial The Hill Presbyterian Church Cape Recife lighthouse

- Location within Eastern Cape Location within South Africa Location within Africa
- Coordinates: 33°57′29″S 25°36′00″E
- Country: South Africa
- Province: Eastern Cape
- Municipality: Nelson Mandela Bay
- Established: 1820; 206 years ago

Government
  - Mayor: Babalwa Lobishe (African National Congress)

Area
  - City: 251.03 km^{2} (96.92 sq mi)
  - Metro: 1,959 km^{2} (756 sq mi)

Population (2020)
  - City: 967,677
  - Rank: 54th in Africa; 5th in South Africa
  - Density: 3,854.8/km^{2} (9,984.0/sq mi)
  - Metro: 1,152,915
  - Metro density: 588.5/km^{2} (1,524/sq mi)

Racial makeup (2011)
  - White: 37.8%
  - Black African: 30.6%
  - Coloured: 27.0%
  - Indian/Asian: 3.2%
  - Other: 1.4%

First languages (2011)
  - Afrikaans: 40.2%
  - English: 33.2%
  - Xhosa: 22.2%
  - Other: 4.3%
- Time zone: UTC+2 (SAST)
- Postal code (street): 6001
- PO box: 6000
- Area code: 041

Gqeberha (English: /kɛˈbɛərxə/ keb-AIR-khə, Xhosa: [ᶢǃʱɛ̀ɓéːxà]), also known as Port Elizabeth and colloquially P.E., (Note: The city is also known as iBhayi in Xhosa and historically as The Bay in English; both names come from the Afrikaans Die Baai.) is a major seaport and the most populous city in the Eastern Cape province of South Africa. It is the seat of the Nelson Mandela Bay Metropolitan Municipality, South Africa's second-smallest metropolitan municipality by area. It is the sixth-most populous city in South Africa and is the cultural, economic and financial hub of the Eastern Cape.

Gqeberha was founded in 1820 as Port Elizabeth by Sir Rufane Donkin, who was the governor of the Cape at the time. He named it after his wife, Elizabeth, who had died in India. The Donkin Memorial in the central business district of the city bears testament to that. It was established by the government of the Cape Colony when 4,000 British colonists settled in Algoa Bay to strengthen the border region between the Cape Colony and the Xhosa. It is nicknamed "The Friendly City" or "The Windy City". In 2019, the Eastern Cape Geographical Names Committee recommended that Port Elizabeth be renamed Gqeberha, after the Xhosa and Southern Khoe name for the Baakens River that flows through the city. The city's name change was officially gazetted on 23 February 2021.

Located on the western portion of Algoa Bay along the southeastern coast of South Africa, the city lies 770 km east of Cape Town. It is east of the Garden Route and faces the Indian Ocean. It covers 251 square kilometers of the Nelson Mandela Bay metropolitan area, and is administered by South Africa's sixth-largest metropolitan municipality. The city's warm oceanic climate ranks it among the top cities in the world for pleasant year-round weather. The city is known for many blue-flag beaches along the city's urban coastline; its popularity as an international and local holiday destination; and its rich and diverse cultural heritage. It is a gateway city for the Eastern Cape's adventure, outdoor and African big five game safari tourism.

== Etymology ==
Gqeberha, the city's official name since 23 February 2021, is a Xhosa word for the Baakens River, which flows through the city.

In 1820, the rising seaport of Algoa Bay was named "Port Elizabeth" in memory of Elizabeth Frances (née Markham), the wife of Sir Rufane Shaw Donkin, acting Governor of the Cape Colony. The settlement is also known by Xhosa speakers as iBhayi or eBhayi, a Xhosa adaptation of the Afrikaans name die Baai, meaning "the Bay", which was also translated and adopted by English-speaking colonists.

== History ==
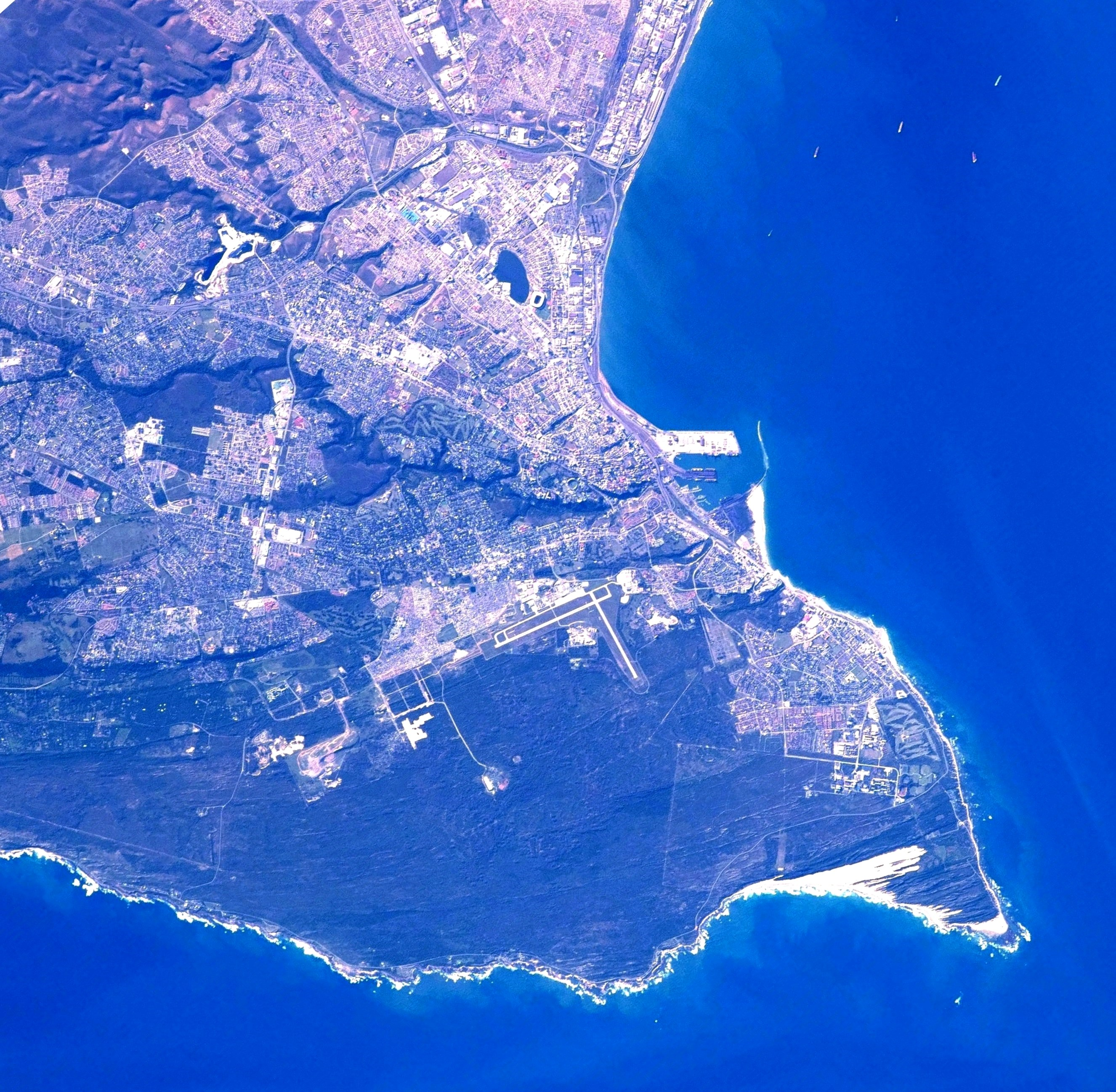
Seen from the International Space Station in 2022

=== Prehistory ===
Cave sites in the area, such as Albany, Wilton and Howieson's Poort, have given their names to various archaeological cultures. The Howieson's Poort site has been of particular interest to interpretations about the origins of fully modern human behaviour. Dating to 65,000 to 62,000 years ago, it has yielded extremely old evidence for bow-and-arrow hunting and shell-bead jewellery. Earlier and Middle Stone Age lithic material has been found in the Sundays River Valley, while at the important site of Amanzi Springs, 40 km north of Gqeberha near Addo, Earlier Stone Age artefacts are found in situ with well-preserved plant and faunal remains within spring sediments (Deacon, 1970). There is Later Stone Age archaeological material preserved in caves and rock shelters, such as Melkhoutboom Cave, in the Cape Fold Mountain Belt surrounding Gqeberha (see Deacon and Deacon, 1963; Deacon, 1976; Binneman, 1997) and large numbers of coastal shell middens have been reported at Humewood, St Georges Strand and the Coega River Mouth (Rudner, 1968). Most recently, Binneman and Webley (1997) reported thirteen shell middens and stone tool scatters about 500 m east of the Coega River mouth in the archaeological assessment carried out for the development of maritime infrastructure for the Port of Ngqura. Importantly, some of this archaeological material was recorded in secondary context in the gravels from older river terraces along the banks of the Coega River.

=== Early history ===
Hunters and gatherers ancestral to the San first settled the area around what is now called Algoa Bay at least 10,000 years ago. Around 2,000 years ago, they were gradually assimilated by agriculturalist populations ancestral to the Xhosa people.

=== British settlement ===
The first Europeans to visit the area sailed with the Portuguese explorers Bartholomeu Dias, who landed on St Croix Island in Algoa Bay in 1488, and Vasco da Gama, who noted the nearby Bird Island in 1497. For centuries, the area appeared on European navigation charts marked simply as "a landing place with fresh water".

The area later became part of the Cape Colony. This area had a turbulent history between the settlement by the Dutch East India Company in 1652 and the formation of the Union of South Africa in 1910.

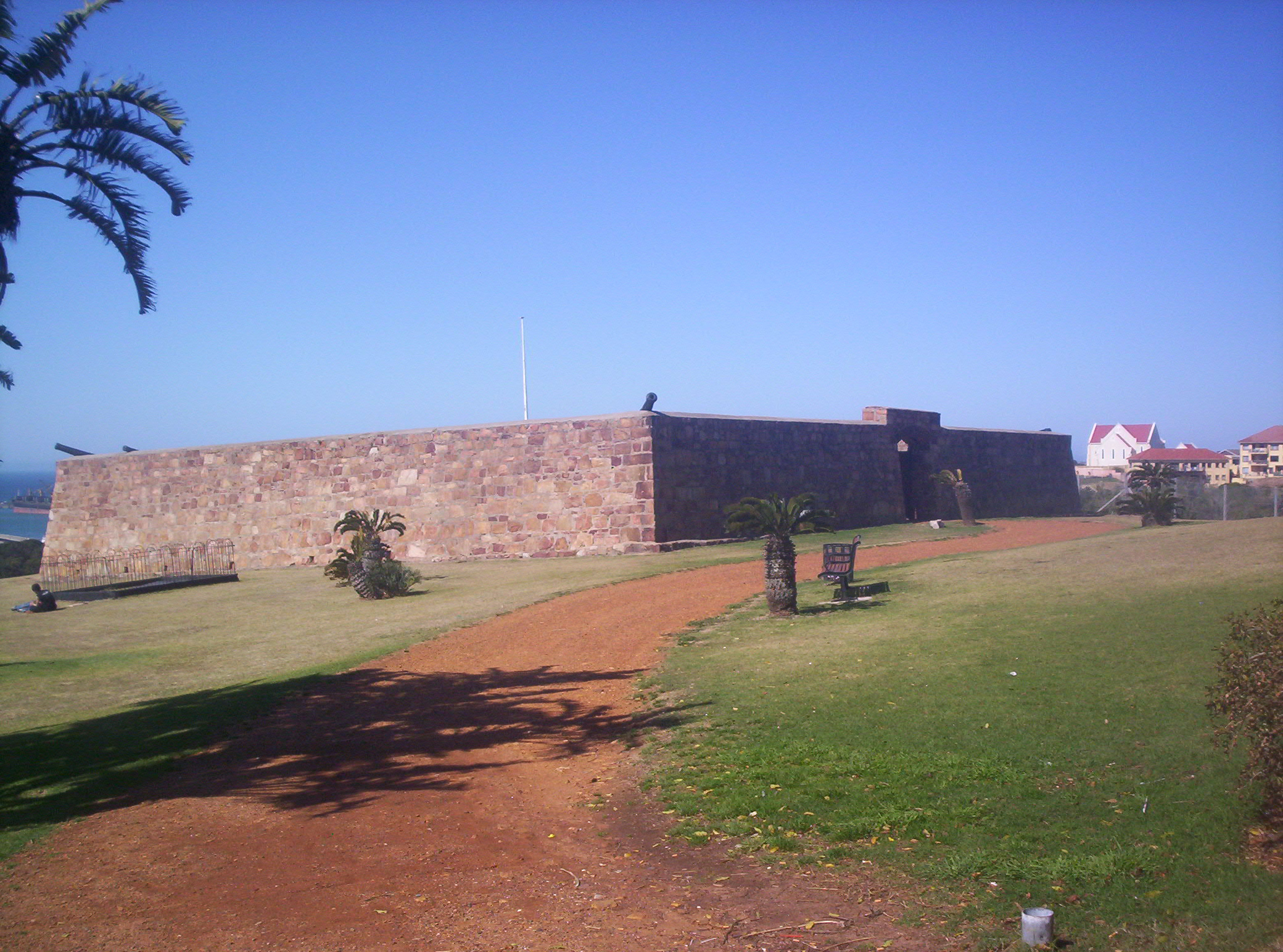
Fort Frederick

In 1799, at the time of the first British occupation of the Colony during the Napoleonic Wars, British troops built a stone fort named Fort Frederick after the Duke of York. This fort, aiming to deter a possible landing of French troops, was constructed to oversee the site of what later became Gqeberha. The fort is now preserved as a monument.

From 1814 to 1821, the Strandfontein farm to the south of the Baakens River was owned by Piet Retief. He later became a Voortrekker leader and was killed in 1837 by Zulu king Dingane during negotiations about land. An estimated 500 men, woman and children of his party were killed. Frederik Korsten, after whom the suburb of Korsten is named, owned the Strandfontein farm after Retief. This area was later developed as Summerstrand, a beachfront suburb.

In 1820, a party of 4,000 British settlers arrived by sea, encouraged by the government of the Cape Colony to form a settlement to strengthen the border region between the Cape Colony and the Xhosa people. At this time the seaport town was founded by Sir Rufane Shaw Donkin, the Acting Governor of the Cape Colony (in office from 1820 to 1821). Diplomat Edmund Roberts visited the city in the early 1830s. Roberts noted in the 1820s that it had "contained four houses, and now it has upward of one hundred houses, and its residents are rated at above twelve hundred persons".

The British garrison at Gqeberha saw the arrival of a further 500 settlers in 1825, one of whom was Rev Francis McClelland, who in the same year was appointed Colonial Chaplain. The Roman Catholic Church established the Apostolic Vicariate of the Cape of Good Hope, Eastern District in the city in 1847.

The city, then under the name Port Elizabeth, was granted the status of an autonomous municipality in 1861.

Cape Colony Prime Minister John Molteno had formed the Cape Government Railways in 1872. Completion of the railway to Kimberley in 1873 was a major stimulus to trade and a rapid increase in population in the town. With the massive expansion of the Cape Colony's railway network to the interior over the following years, the harbour of Gqeberha became the focus for serving import and export needs of a large area of the Cape's hinterland. The rapid economic development around the port, which followed the railway construction, caused the city to be nicknamed "the Liverpool of South Africa", after the major British port. The town expanded as a diverse community, comprising Xhosa as well as European, Cape Malay, and other immigrants.

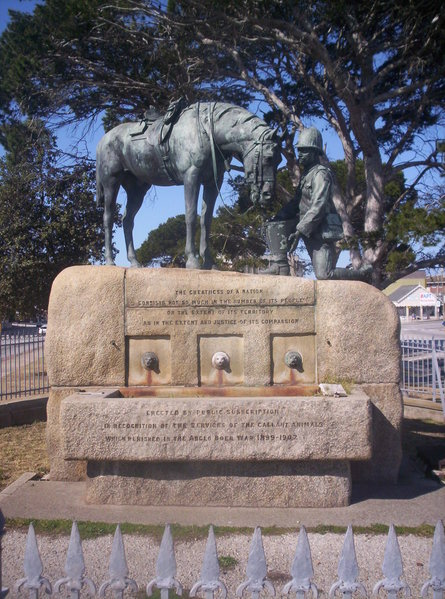
Horse Memorial

During the Second Boer War of 1899–1902, the port served as an important transit-point for British soldiers, horses, and materials headed by railway to the front. No armed conflict took place within the city, but it felt the effects of the war with the arrival of many refugees who moved into the city. These included Boer women and children, whom the British interned in a concentration camp.

After the war, the British erected a monument to military horses that died during the war. "The unveiling of the monument commemorating the services of the horses which perished during the Anglo Boer War, 1899–1902, took place on Saturday afternoon, 11 February 1905, with the Mayor, Mr A Fettes, performing the ceremony."

=== Apartheid era ===
Under apartheid, the South African government established legal racial segregation and started programs to separate communities physically as well as by classification and custom. The forced relocation under the auspices of the Group Areas Act of the non-white population from mixed areas began in 1962, causing various townships to be built for their use. Classification was sometimes arbitrary, and as in many other localities throughout the country, many citizens appearing to have mixed ancestry were at times subject to re-classification, which often had intrusive sociopolitical results. The non-white tenants of South End, and land owners in Fairview were forcibly relocated from 1965 through to 1975, as these areas were valued as prime real estate. The city-planning was viewed as the prototypical apartheid city.

As black South Africans organised to try to achieve civil rights and social justice, government repression increased. In 1977 Steve Biko, the black anti-apartheid activist, was interrogated and tortured by the security police in Gqeberha before being taken to Pretoria, where he died. Other notable deaths in the city during this time included those of the Cradock Four, and of George Botha, a high-school teacher.

==== 1952 Defiance Campaign ====
In 1952 the African National Congress and the South African Indian Congress (SAIC) called all South Africans to stand up against the apartheid government's unjust laws directed at the black African, Indian and coloured population. On 6 April, while most white South Africans celebrated the tercentenary of Jan van Riebeeck's arrival at the Cape in 1652, the ANC and SAIC called on black South Africans to observe the day as "A National Day of Pledge and Prayer". 15 000 people attended in Johannesburg, 10 000 in Cape Town, 10 000 in Durban and 20 000 in Gqeberha. The meeting in Gqeberha was led by Professor Z. K. Matthews and by Raymond Mhlaba.

On 25 July 1952, a day before the official start of the Defiance Campaign, 30 volunteers led by Raymond Mhlaba gathered at the New Brighton Civic Centre and prayed throughout the night. At 5 am on 26 July, they left the Civic Centre and walked towards the New Brighton Railway Station. In Raymond Mhlaba's Personal Memoirs: Reminiscing from Rwanda and Uganda, Mhlaba recalled:

"I led the very first group and we entered the 'Europeans Only' section of the New Brighton station. By half past six we were already in police vans on our way to jail. It turned out that my party (group) was the very first to defy unjust laws in the whole of South Africa. Little did we know that we were making history."

Mhlaba became the first man to be arrested during the campaign, while Florence Matomela was the first woman. 2 007 people were arrested in Gqeberha during the Defiance Campaign included Oom Gov (Govan Mbeki) and Vuyisile Mini. Other volunteers who emerged as key role players during the campaign included Nosipho Dastile, Nontuthuzelo Mabala, Lilian Diedricks and Veronica Sobukwe.

==== 1985 Consumer Boycotts ====
After the formation of the ANC-affiliated United Democratic Front in 1983, political consciousness in black townships grew. With numerous protests across the country and the massacre in Langa township near Uitenhage, police presence had increased in South African townships. In the townships, black South Africans demanded the integration of public institutions, the removal of troops from black townships, and the end of workplace discrimination. To launch an effective campaign to cripple the white-owned institutions of Gqeberha and to undermine the legitimacy of apartheid, several women suggested the idea of a consumer boycott to the Port Elizabeth Black Civic Organisation (PEBCO) in May 1985. The economic boycott began on 15 July 1985, and received massive support in townships around Gqeberha. By September 1985, white business-owners became desperate and called on the government to meet the demands of black South Africans. In November the boycott was still hurting white businesses in Gqeberha greatly. The white South African government reached an agreement with PEBCO which stated that the boycott would halt until March 1986 if business owners arranged for the release of black leaders.

In 1986, as the deal was approaching its end, the boycotters imposed a deadline of 31 March, stating that the boycott would resume if the initial demands were not met. On 11 March the government unexpectedly banned two leaders, one of whom was Mkuseli Jack. However, on 22 March the ban was lifted by the decision of a Supreme Court Justice on the grounds that the government had given insufficient reasons. Jack ripped up the ban papers, and used the celebration as a way to represent the solidarity that the campaign required. As the demands of the boycotters were not met by 31 March, the boycott was renewed on 1 April. The boycott continued for nine weeks, but on 12 June 1986 another state of emergency was imposed by the National Party government. Security forces searched through the townships, arresting thousands and raiding the offices of black civics, trade unions, the UDF, the South African Council, and churches and also confiscating documents.

=== Modern history ===
With the establishment of the Coega Industrial Development Zone (CIDZ), foreign direct and also national-level investment has improved in the greater region of Nelson Mandela Bay. The IDZ, under the stewardship of the Coega Development Corporation (CDC), since inception has managed to attract to investment account in excess of R140-billion into the economy of the Eastern Cape and has enabled the creation of over 45,000 jobs. This is significant for the area and the economy of the Eastern Cape.

In 2001, the Nelson Mandela Bay Metropolitan Municipality was formed as an administrative area covering Gqeberha, the neighbouring towns of Uitenhage and Despatch and the surrounding agricultural areas. The name honours former President Nelson Mandela. The combined metropolitan area had a population estimated at 1.3 million in 2006.

==== 2010 FIFA World Cup ====
Overtaking its next door neighbouring city East London, it became a host city for the 2010 FIFA World Cup. The Nelson Mandela Bay Stadium hosted eight World Cup games: South Korea vs Greece, Ivory Coast vs Portugal, Germany vs Serbia; Chile vs Switzerland, and Slovenia vs England in the Group Stage, then Uruguay, South Korea in the Round of 16. A quarter-final between Netherlands, Brazil was hosted, then for the Third Place playoff, Uruguay and Germany were hosted at the stadium. The World Cup was played between 11 June 2010 and 11 July 2010. Spain were the eventual champions.

==== 2013 Africa Cup of Nations ====
The city was also one of the five that hosted the 2013 Africa Cup of Nations. The same stadium that was used in the 2010 World Cup hosted eight games: five matches in Group B—Ghana vs DR Congo, Mali vs Niger, Ghana vs Mali; DR Congo vs Niger, and Ghana vs Niger; one match in Group A—Cape Verde vs Angola, the quarterfinal—Ghana vs Cape Verde, and the third place playoff—Ghana vs Mali. The Africa Cup of Nations took place between 19 January and 10 February 2013. Nigeria were eventual champions.

== Geography ==
=== Climate ===
Gqeberha

Climate chart (precipitation, max. and min. temperature)
J	F	M	A	M	J	J	A	S	O	N	D
36 25 18	40 25 18	54 25 17	58 23 14	59 22 12	62 20 9	47 20 9	64 20 10	62 20 11	59 21 13	49 22 15	34 24 16
- █ Average max. and min. temperatures in °C
- █ Precipitation totals in mm
- Source: SAWS
Imperial conversion
J	F	M	A	M	J	J	A	S	O	N	D
1.4 77 64	1.6 77 64	2.1 77 63	2.3 73 57	2.3 72 54	2.4 68 48	1.9 68 48	2.5 68 50	2.4 68 52	2.3 70 55	1.9 72 59	1.3 75 61
- █ Average max. and min. temperatures in °F
- █ Precipitation totals in inches

Under the Köppen climate classification, the city has an oceanic climate (Cfb), and under the Trewartha climate classification, the city has a subtropical climate (Cfbl). The area lies between the winter rainfall, Mediterranean climate zones of the Western Cape and the summer rainfall regions of eastern South Africa. Winters are cool but mild and summers are warm but considerably less humid and hot than more northerly parts of South Africa's east coast. The climate is very even throughout the year with extreme heat or moderate cold rare.

Climate data for Gqeberha (1991–2020, extremes 1936–1990)
Month	Jan	Feb	Mar	Apr	May	Jun	Jul	Aug	Sep	Oct	Nov	Dec	Year
Record high °C (°F)	39.0 (102.2)	40.0 (104.0)	40.7 (105.3)	39.0 (102.2)	35.4 (95.7)	32.4 (90.3)	33.1 (91.6)	36.8 (98.2)	39.7 (103.5)	39.8 (103.6)	40.2 (104.4)	36.0 (96.8)	40.7 (105.3)
Mean daily maximum °C (°F)	25.7 (78.3)	26.1 (79.0)	25.0 (77.0)	23.3 (73.9)	22.1 (71.8)	20.6 (69.1)	20.2 (68.4)	20.0 (68.0)	20.4 (68.7)	21.4 (70.5)	22.7 (72.9)	24.4 (75.9)	22.6 (72.7)
Daily mean °C (°F)	21.6 (70.9)	21.9 (71.4)	20.6 (69.1)	18.5 (65.3)	16.6 (61.9)	14.5 (58.1)	14.1 (57.4)	14.6 (58.3)	15.6 (60.1)	17.1 (62.8)	18.5 (65.3)	20.2 (68.4)	17.8 (64.0)
Mean daily minimum °C (°F)	17.4 (63.3)	17.6 (63.7)	16.2 (61.2)	13.6 (56.5)	11.0 (51.8)	8.3 (46.9)	7.9 (46.2)	9.1 (48.4)	10.7 (51.3)	12.8 (55.0)	14.2 (57.6)	16.0 (60.8)	12.9 (55.2)
Record low °C (°F)	7.4 (45.3)	7.9 (46.2)	7.0 (44.6)	4.4 (39.9)	−0.3 (31.5)	−0.5 (31.1)	−0.5 (31.1)	−0.2 (31.6)	1.5 (34.7)	3.0 (37.4)	5.6 (42.1)	6.5 (43.7)	−0.5 (31.1)
Average precipitation mm (inches)	33.0 (1.30)	39.3 (1.55)	46.2 (1.82)	48.5 (1.91)	46.9 (1.85)	51.7 (2.04)	51.4 (2.02)	72.1 (2.84)	47.3 (1.86)	56.2 (2.21)	56.6 (2.23)	42.2 (1.66)	591.5 (23.29)
Average precipitation days (≥ 1.0 mm)	5.4	5.3	6.2	5.5	5.1	5.4	5.7	6.6	6.6	6.4	6.8	6.0	71.1
Average relative humidity (%)	77	80	81	80	76	73	74	76	77	78	78	77	77
Mean monthly sunshine hours	259.3	221.2	231.4	216.9	215.9	208.4	224.4	234.4	228.9	231.4	242.4	257.7	2,772.1
Source 1: NOAA (temperature, precipitation/precipitation days and sunshine 1991–2020, humidity 1961–1990) Deutscher Wetterdienst (extremes)
Source 2: South African Weather Service

=== Biodiversity ===
The city represents a large percentage of South Africa's biological diversity is a confluence point five of the seven South African biomes, namely the Thicket, Grassland, Nama-Karoo, Fynbos and Forest Biomes. A number of municipal nature reserves have been included in, and can be visited along the "Outward Bound Route" of the city. A mosaic of these 5 Biomes could be experienced in these reserves. The outward bound route is an eco-outdoor adventure and sports route incorporating walking and wildlife experiences. The aim of this route is to spread tourism to similar attractions along the route, leading to increased foot traffic and related benefits to these sites.

=== Architecture ===
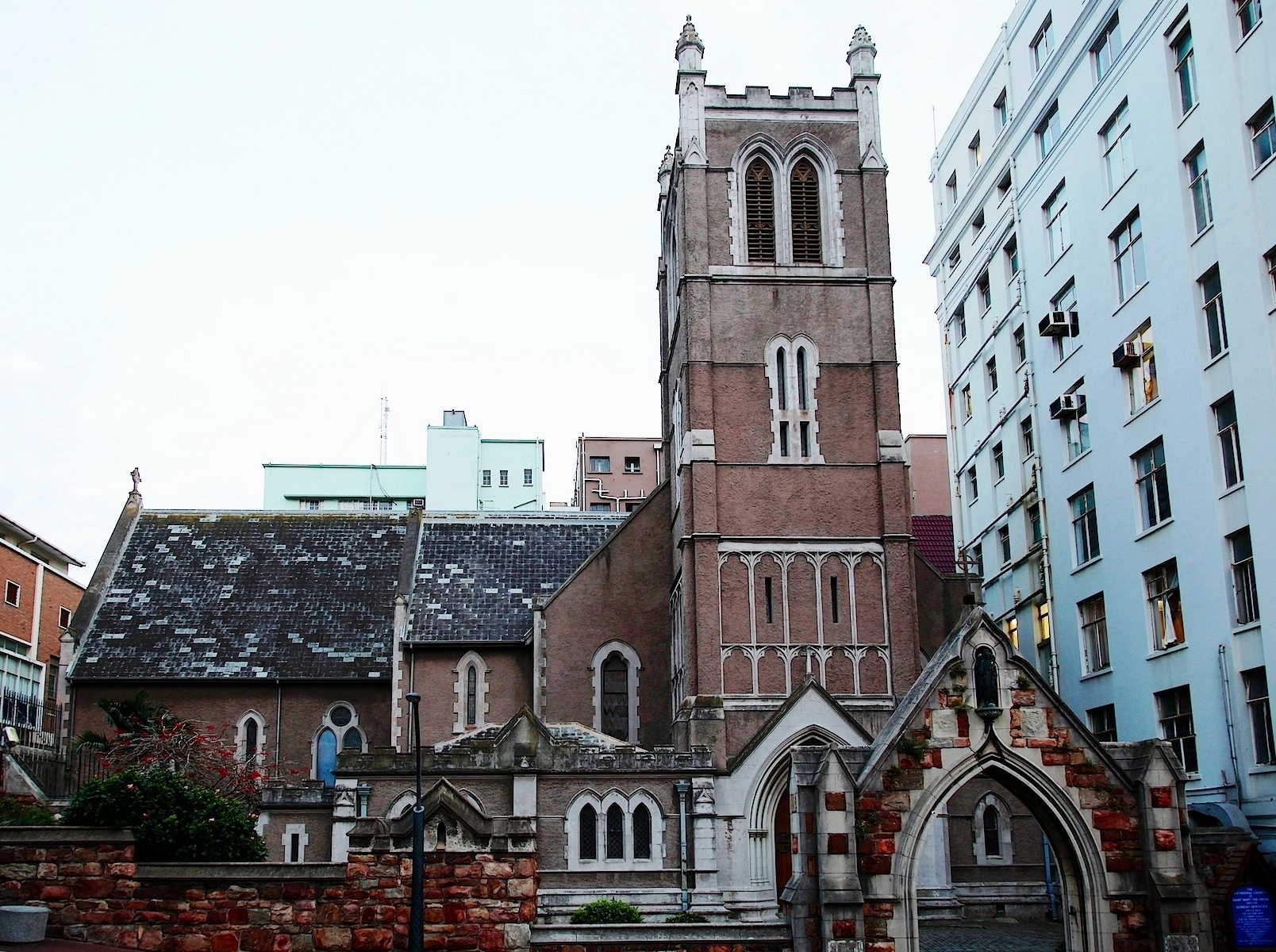
The cathedral of St Mary the Virgin

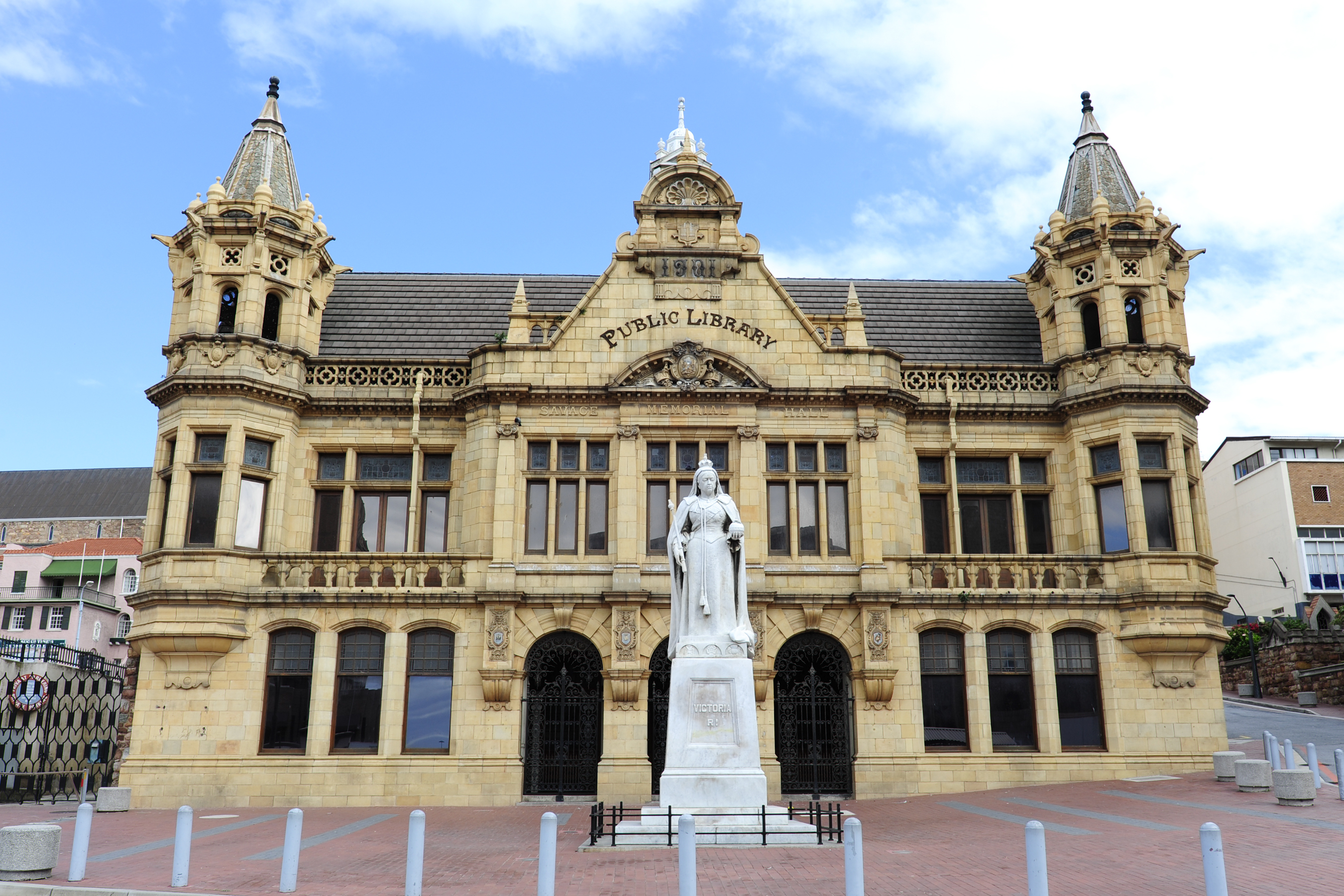
The Main Library building was constructed in 1835 and used as a courthouse from 1854. The library was opened in 1902 and is an example of Victorian Gothic architecture.

As a British colonial town, it had a strongly British character, and the central area retains that to this day. The colonial City Hall is a national monument, as well as the Mandela Bay Theatre Complex Opera House, the oldest theatre in Africa. The main public library is an excellent example of Victorian Gothic architecture. Various memorials are situated throughout the city environs, and there are many tours available, like the Donkin Heritage Trail, to familiarise visitors with the local culture and history, including the apartheid era history. The city could be considered to be the country's leading centre of Art Deco style architecture due to its European heritage. Many buildings display the intricate stonework, wrought iron and stained glass of that era which are prominently visible in the Central Historical areas of the city. Combinations of Art Nouveau and Colonial styles are seen in residences along Cape Road. The area also boasts a collection of Cape Dutch style architecture as well as the Victorian and Edwardian styles, resulting from the arrival of the 1820 British settlers. Although influenced by Dutch architecture, the Cape Dutch style is unique to South Africa and examples can be seen all over the Eastern and Western Cape.

=== Hydrology ===
The city has a long marine coastline on its outskirts, particularly southwards. Beaches like Kings Beach, Hobie Beach, Bluewater Bay, Sardinia Bay (just outside the city near Schoenmakerskop), and the beaches along Marine Drive are abundant. Kings Beach is adjacent to the harbour, and the longshore drift from Cape Recife provides a plentiful supply of sea sand. On the north westerly coastline, the contours tends to be rockier than the area between Cape Recife, and the Port of Ngqura. There are a few rivers, of which the Baakens River is the most prominent. This river usually floods when a reasonable amount precipitation is observed, especially at low level crossings. North End Lake in North End is the largest natural freshwater body in the city, but has experienced a form of contamination from industry. (It is not recommended to ingest anything from this lake) Also, numerous smaller "lakes" are in the surrounding area, namely Lake Farm.

The Eastern Cape has been experiencing a devastating drought since 2015, and a disaster was declared in the region in October 2019. On 14 June 2022, a virtual special council meeting of Nelson Mandela Bay Municipality Council approved an emergency intervention plan by the National Department of Water and Sanitation. The plan includes: drilling more boreholes, pumping water from the east of the metropolitan area to the west of the area, and using floatation pumps to extract more water from some reservoirs. The meeting approved the appointment of Tlhologelo Mogoatlhe (a water and sanitation production engineer) as the interim infrastructure and engineering executive director. City officials asked residents to consume no more than 50 litres (11 imp gal) of water per person per day. In mid-June 2022, Luvuyo Bangazi (spokesperson for the municipality's joint operations crisis committee) said that the city was losing about a third of its water because of leaks in pipes, and had a backlog of 3,000 leaks to fix. Joseph Tsatsire (Bay Water Distribution Director) said that Nelson Mandela Bay Municipality repaired 9,719 leaks over a three week period ending in mid-July 2022, leaving a backlog of 712 leaks reported. Though some residents claimed that the taps only work a few hours a day, Bangazi said that water was only shut off when maintenance was being done. Water consumption for the Nelson Mandela Bay Municipality was as follows:

- Target: 230 megalitres per day
- Measured on 17 June 2022: 292 megalitres per day
- Measured on 19 July 2022: 261 megalitres per day.

== Demographics ==
Population density in the Nelson Mandela Metro: <1 /km²; 1–3 /km²; 3–10 /km²; 10–30 /km²; 30–100 /km²; 100–300 /km²; 300–1000 /km²; 1000–3000 /km²; >3000 /km²

Geographical distribution of home languages in the Nelson Mandela Metro: Afrikaans; English; Xhosa; None dominant

In the 2011 census, Gqeberha was the most populous city in the Eastern Cape. In 2011:

- Area: 251.03 square kilometres (96.92 sq mi)
- Population: 312,392: 1,244.44 inhabitants per square kilometre (3,223.1/sq mi)
- Households: 99,794: 397.54 per square kilometre (1,029.6/sq mi)

Gender	Population	%
Female	162,255	51.94
Male	150,137	48.06

Race	Population	%
White	118,220	37.4
Black	95,589	30.60
Coloured	84,419	27.02
Asian	9,847	3.15
Other	4,317	1.38

First language	Population	%
IsiZulu	1,541	0.51
IsiXhosa	67,154	22.24
Afrikaans	121,344	40.19
Sepedi	472	0.16
Setswana	1,312	0.43
English	100,375	33.25
Sesotho	1,469	0.49
Xitsonga	291	0.10
SiSwati	171	0.06
Tshivenda	390	0.13
IsiNdebele	1,183	0.39
Other	10,469	3.35

Historical population
Year	Pop.	±%
1985	272,844	—
1991	303,353	+11.2%
2001	237,503	−21.7%
2011	312,392	+31.5%
2020	967,767	+209.8%

Ethnic makeup of Gqeberha (Port Elizabeth), 1855–1936
Ethnic group	1855		1865		1875		1891		1904		1911		1921		1936	
	Number	Percent	Number	Percent	Number	Percent	Number	Percent	Number	Percent	Number	Percent	Number	Percent	Number	Percent
White	4,000	66.67%	7,000	63.63%	9,000	69.23%	14,000	58.33%	23,000	54.76%	20,000	48.78%	27,000	50.00%	54,000	47.37%
Black	1,000	16.67%	2,000	18.18%	2,000	15.38%	4,000	16.67%	7,000	16.67%	8,000	19.51%	12,000	22.22%	30,000	26.31%
Coloured	1,000	16.67%	2,000	18.18%	2,000	15.38%	6,000	25.00%	10,000	23.81%	12,000	29.27%	14,000	25.92%	28,000	24.56%
Indian/Asian	–	–	–	–	–	–	–	–	2,000	4.76%	1,000	2.44%	1,000	1.85%	2,000	1.75%

Ethnic makeup of Gqeberha (Port Elizabeth), 1951–1985
Ethnic group	1951		1960		1970		1980		1985	
	Number	Percent	Number	Percent	Number	Percent	Number	Percent	Number	Percent
Black	71,000	35.32%	121,000	42.01%	167,000	43.15%	296,000	56.10%	233,000	46.41%
White	80,000	39.80%	95,000	33.00%	120,000	31.00%	120,000	22.73%	131,000	26.10%
Coloured	46,000	22.89%	68,000	23.61%	95,000	24.55%	106,000	22.73%	131,000	26.10%
Indian/Asian	4,000	2.00%	4,000	1.40%	5,000	1.30%	6,000	1.14%	7,000	1.40%

Ethnic makeup of Nelson Mandela Bay Metro, 2001–2011
Ethnic group	2001		2011	
	Number	Percent	Number	Percent
Black African	593,410	59%	691,269	60%
Coloured	231,329	23%	276,507	24%
White	170,982	17%	161,296	14%
Indian/Asian	10,057	1%	23,042	2%

== Economy ==
The economy is primarily oriented towards automotive assembly, manufacturing and export industries, and the city is also a major South African and sub-Saharan African destination for investment. Foreign direct investments of $19,8 billion has been secured over the past decade. Several Fortune 500 companies are present or have their African operations headquartered in the city.

=== Trade and industry ===
Historically, the majority of trade in the region came through Gqeberha. In the 1830s, at least five ships regularly transported goods to Europe. It became a free port in 1832. In 1833, about 50 vessels had moved through the port. In 1828, 55,201 pounds, (25038 kg), of goods were imported through the port, increasing by 1832 to 112,845 pounds, (51185 kg), imported in that year. Gqeberha exported 41,290 lbs, (18738 kg), in 1828, with a large increase to 86,931 lbs, (39431 kg), goods exported in 1829. Exports included wine, brandy, vinegar, ivory, hides and skins, leather, tallow, butter, soap, wool, ostrich feathers, salted beef, wheat, candles, aloe, barley, and more.

Home of South Africa's motor vehicle industry, the city boasts most vehicle assembly plants, General Motors, Ford, Volkswagen, Continental Tyres and many other automotive companies. As of 2018, after GM's exit from South Africa, Isuzu took over their production plant in Struandale. In 2016, Chinese state-owned automotive manufacturer BAIC and South Africa's Industrial Development Corporation announced a R11 billion joint venture for the establishment of a semi knock down vehicle assembly plant in Coega. It is anticipated that the plant will go online in 2020. The FAW also have built a multi-billion rand plant in the region. Most other industries are geared towards the motor vehicle industry, providing parts such as wiring harnesses, catalytic converters, batteries and tyres to the vehicle manufacturers.

The largest economic sectors in Nelson Mandela Bay Metro are manufacturing, finance, community services and transport. Community services, trade and manufacturing sectors are the sectors that create the most employment in the Metro. The city offers a wealth of tourism and recreation opportunity due to its biodiversity, beaches and open spaces. Further still, Nelson Mandela Bay is a preferred region for the manufacturing of pharmaceuticals, flour, meat, frozen vegetables, soft drinks, chocolates, cheese, yoghurt, ice cream, paper and leather products.

The city is also a major seaport, with the most significant car loading facilities in the southern hemisphere. As part of the ongoing development, a new Industrial Development Zone with expanded port facilities has been built at Coega.

=== Tourism ===
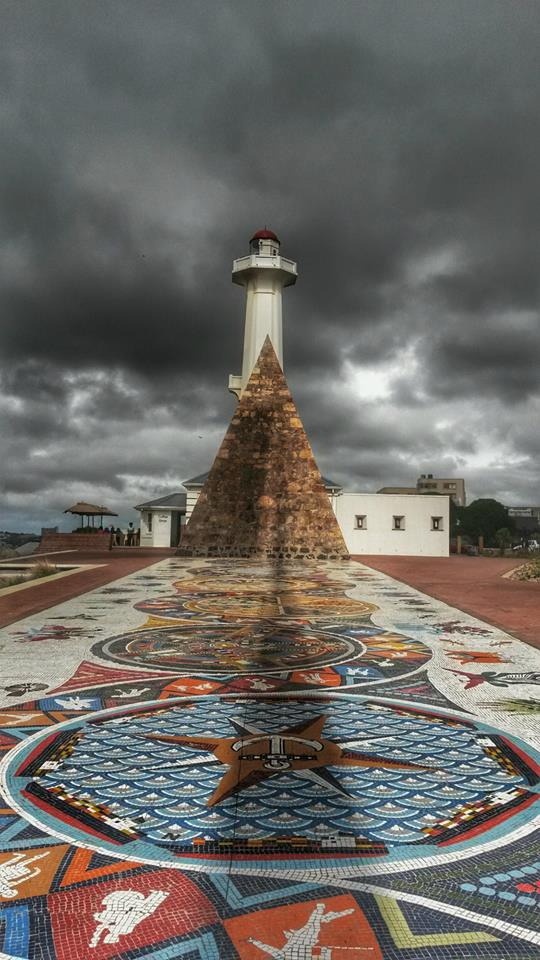
The Donkin Reserve, taken in September 2014. It portrays both the older and parts of the newer sections of the monument.

Located at the end of the picturesque Garden Route along the Cape coast, the city has beaches in and near it. The most popular swimming beaches include King's Beach and Hobie Beach.

Many local historic attractions are linked by the Donkin Heritage Trail. These include the Campanile (bell tower), built in 1923 to commemorate the arrival of the 1820 Settlers and offering a viewpoint over the city; the city hall (1862); the Donkin Reserve park and monument; and the old stone Fort Frederick itself (1799). The CBD also boasts the towering Eastern Cape post office headquarters.

Route 67 is a walking trail consisting of 67 public artworks, symbolising 67 years which Nelson Mandela dedicated to the freedom of South Africa. The artwork is a celebration of South African culture and history and is scattered along the route as it starts from the Campanile, up the stairs to the Vuysile Mini Market Square and to the large South African flag at the Donkin Reserve. The artworks were created by local Eastern Cape artists.

Other attractions include the gardens at St George's Park, the Nelson Mandela Metropolitan Art Museum (formerly known as the King George VI Art Gallery), the museum and oceanography room at Humewood, and the new Boardwalk waterfront complex.

The wider area surrounding PE also features game viewing opportunities, including the Addo Elephant National Park, 72 kilometres (45 mi) to the north near the Zuurberg mountain range.

It is also a destination for whale watching with humpback whales sighted between June and August, and again between November and January, southern right whales sighted between July and November, and Bryde's whales sighted all year round.

=== Property development ===
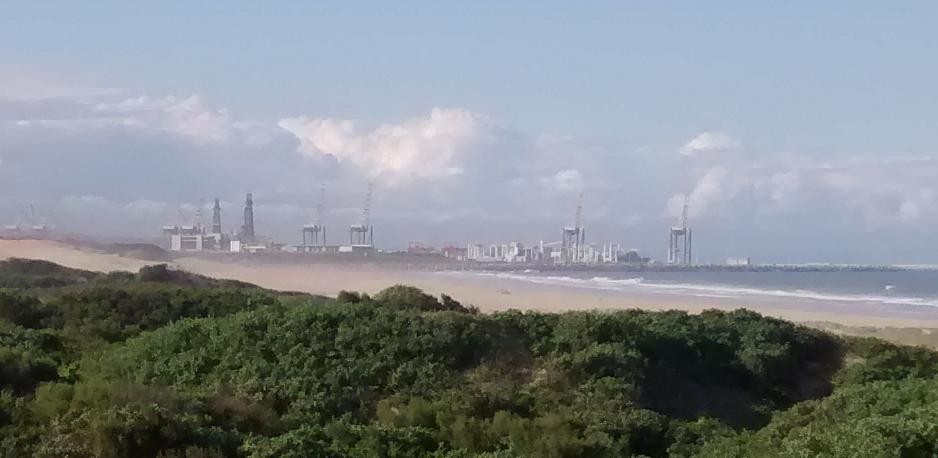
Coega Industrial Development Zone (IDZ)

Nelson Mandela Bay has experienced a construction boom led by the Baywest Mall and Coega Development Corporation (CDC).

Baywest Mall which opened in May 2015 is the largest shopping centre in the Eastern Cape located on the western outskirts of the city and forms part of the Baywest City. Baywest City is a planned mixed-use development area and is striving to become a major development hub in the city's western suburbs.

Coega located just outside of the city once an industrial development zone (IDZ) has now deemed the status of a special economic zone (SEZ). It also houses the second and the newest port of Nelson Mandela Bay and South Africa, Port of Ngqura. This multi-billion rand project aims to drive local and foreign direct investments in export-oriented industries and position South Africa as the hub for Southern African trade.

== Culture ==
There is only one foreign cultural centre, the Alliance Française of Port Elizabeth, a French language school and a francophone cultural centre.

=== Sports ===
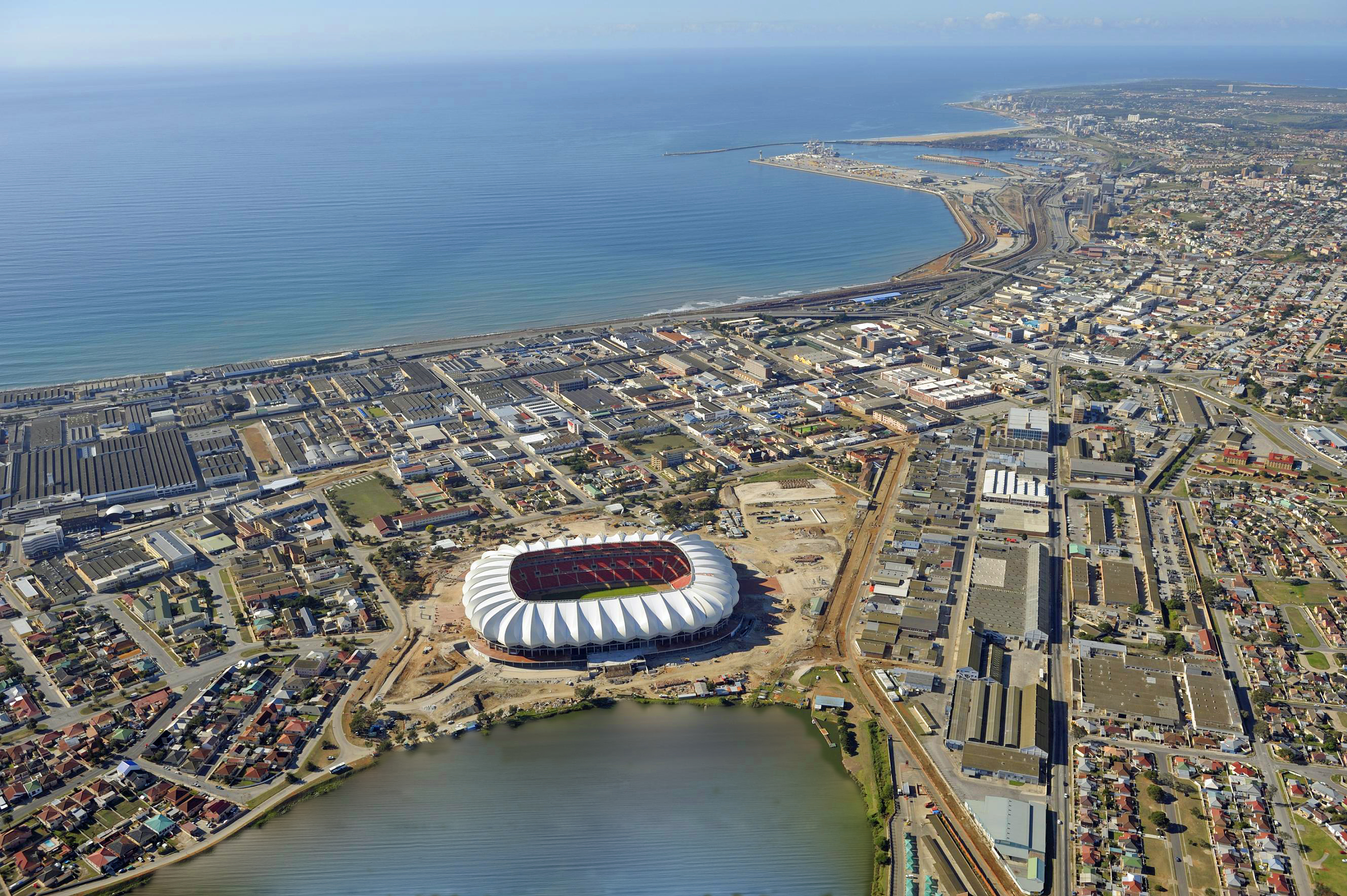
The Nelson Mandela Bay Stadium in 2009

It is the location of the St George's Park cricket ground, which holds test cricket matches. St George's Park is the oldest cricket ground in South Africa, and was the venue for the first Test match played outside of Australia or England, between South Africa and England on 12 and 13 March 1889. The Warriors, a franchise cricket team in South Africa, is based in Gqeberha, as is the SA20 franchise Sunrisers Eastern Cape. The stadium is also known for its band that entertains fans at the Proteas games.

In December 2011, Nelson Mandela Bay Stadium became the new home of the South Africa Sevens, the country's leg of the annual IRB Sevens World Series in rugby sevens. The event had previously been held in three other cities, most recently in George in the Western Cape from 2002 to 2010. As of 2015, is hosted annually in Cape Town, in the Western Cape.

The headquarters of the Southern Spears rugby franchise was in Gqeberha. The long-standing Eastern Province Rugby Union, now commonly known as the Eastern Province Elephants, formed the basis of the Spears franchise together with East London's Border Bulldogs. The remnants of the Spears were later reconstituted into the Southern Kings, also based in Gqeberha, which joined Super Rugby in 2013. The Southern Kings did not participate in Super Rugby in 2014 or 2015, and returned to Super Rugby in 2016, 2017, but were dropped for economical reasons by SARU. The team now competes in the Guinness Pro14. The Eastern Province Rugby Union play their home matches at Nelson Mandela Bay Stadium, built for the 2010 FIFA World Cup.

The biggest sporting events in the city, is the annual Ironman triathlon and the Herald Cycle tour. The Tuna classic deep-sea fishing competition attracts anglers from all over the world.

There are cricket, rugby union, athletics, association football, field hockey and many other sports facilities. Its coastal location also makes it a base for some watersports.

The city's main football club is Chippa United, they currently use the Nelson Mandela Bay Stadium as their home ground. Previous clubs to play in the country's top tier were Bay United, Michau Warriors, Port Elizabeth Blackpool, Hotspur F.C., Port Elizabeth City and Westview Apollon.

The Algoa Bay Yacht Club operates out of the port.

== Government ==
Gqeberha had its own municipality from 1843 to 2000. Since then, it has formed part of the Nelson Mandela Bay Metropolitan Municipality, and also serves as the seat for the surrounding Cacadu District Municipality. It has a Magistrate's Court, a local seat of the Eastern Cape Division of the High Court, and a branch of the Labour Court. As a result of the presence of a High Court, several other related organs of state such as a Masters Office and a Director of Public Prosecutions are present in the city. All Government (mostly provincial) departments maintain branches or other offices in the city.

=== Coat of arms ===
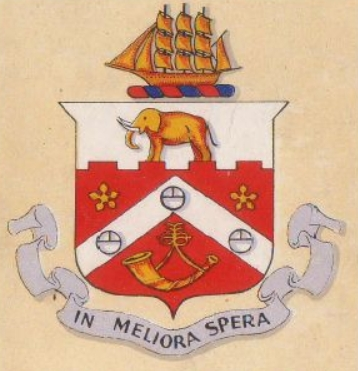
Port Elizabeth Coat of Arms

The Port Elizabeth municipality assumed a coat of arms on 9 January 1878. The design, prepared by Bradbury Wilkinson and Company (of London), was a simplified version of the arms of Sir Rufane Donkin: Gules, on a chevron Argent between two cinquefoils in chief and a bugle horn stringed in base Or, three buckles Sable; a chief embattled Argent thereon an elephant statant proper. The crest was a sailing ship, and the motto In meliora spera.

(In layman's terms: a red shield displaying, from top to bottom, an elephant on a silver horizontal strip whose lower edge is embattled, two gold cinquefoils, a silver chevron bearing three black buckles, and a gold bugle horn.)

Eighty years later, in 1958, the council made slight changes to the arms, and had them granted by the College of Arms. The changes consisted of adding two anchors to the chief of the shield, placing a red mural crown bearing three golden rings below the ship in the crest, and changing the motto to Tu meliora spera. The arms were registered with the Cape Provincial Administration in 1959, and at the Bureau of Heraldry in 1986.

== Education ==
=== Tertiary education ===
The Nelson Mandela University was formed by the amalgamation of the University of Port Elizabeth, Port Elizabeth Technikon, and the Port Elizabeth campus of Vista University. It is the largest university in the Eastern and Southern Cape, with around 29,000 students in seven faculties spread over seven campuses.

=== Secondary education ===
The city has a number of top government-funded and private schools, including Alexander Road High School, Collegiate Girls' High School, Grey High School, Otto du Plessis High School, Pearson High School, Victoria Park High School, Westering High School, Woodridge College, Linkside High School, Newton Technical High School, Andrew Rabie High School, Lawson Brown High School, and Morningside High School. Substance abuse appears to be a prevailing problem in some schools due to a lack of drug prevention training on the part of the educational system.

== Transport ==
=== Roads ===
Gqeberha lies on the N2 road. To the west the road travels the Garden Route to George and Cape Town; to the east, the road runs through the Border Country through Makhanda, to East London then on to Durban, terminating in Ermelo in Mpumalanga. The R75 connects the city to Despatch, Uitenhage and the Karoo. The major routes within the city are numbered as metropolitan or M routes.

The city's main bus station is in Market Square. The public bus service is run by the Algoa Bus Company. Between 1881 and 1948, there was a Port Elizabeth tramway network, powered initially by horses, and later by electricity.

The city is in the process of building a bus rapid transit system which was intended for the 2010 FIFA World Cup. This has been a massive failure as local taxi associations have prevented the implementation. The city lacks a proper public transport system which has had a negative impact on the poorer residents of the city who are dependent on public transport. Construction of the bus rapid transit network has been suspended due to mismanagement which led to the project missing its May 2010 deadline. Calls for the project, which has left many parts of the city in a permanent state of construction, have been made recently, and it is expected that the government will make a decision on the matter soon.

=== Railway ===
Port Elizabeth railway station is served by South Africa's rail network. Local commuter services are operated by Metrorail, while the Shosholoza Meyl long-distance passenger service links PE with Johannesburg via Bloemfontein where it is possible to connect with other long-distance routes.

=== Air ===
Chief Dawid Stuurman International Airport (IATA airport code PLZ, ICAO airport code FAPE) serves the city for both passenger and cargo traffic. It is the fourth busiest airport in South Africa after O.R. Tambo International Airport, King Shaka International Airport in Durban, and Cape Town International Airport.

International visitors to the city must currently fly to either Johannesburg, Cape Town or Durban, and then take a domestic flight to Gqeberha. An upgrade to the terminal building, completed in 2004, created the necessary facilities to handle international flights although none are scheduled as yet.

=== Sea ===
The city has a harbour in Algoa Bay, and the construction of an additional international harbour at Coega has supported an increase in the size of the city's industries and the addition of new industries.

== Municipal ==
=== Water sources ===
One of the water sources from which the city gets its water is via a series of canals, tunnels and rain basin transfer schemas that starts in the Free State at Gariep Dam – Transfer Scheme (Additional Documentaries Resource), about 5 hours away at 462 km. The water from Gariep Dam is transferred via the Orange-Fish River Project (Tunnel) into the Great Fish River Valley, then again into the Sundays River Valley (Canals and Tunnels Scheme) North-West of the city. Since 1992 the water from the Sundays River Valley has been supplied to the city.

Gariep Dam water is also used for electricity generation by Eskom hydro-electric power station, remotely controlled from Gauteng. Therefore, it must be managed carefully by balancing the supply-and-demand of this water resource usage for its derivatives of electricity generation, irrigation, and municipal drinking water. Other nearby dams include Kouga Dam, Kromme Dam, Groendal Dam, Impofu Dam, and Lourie Dam.

== Health care ==
The city has numerous government-funded and private hospitals.

== Media ==
=== Radio ===
The city is served by a few radio stations, namely Algoa FM (regional radio broadcasting to the entire Eastern Cape, Garden Route, and globally via internet) and Umhlobo Wenene FM.

=== Newspapers ===
The Herald serves English readers in terms of newspapers, on a daily basis. Die Burger serves the Afrikaans-speaking communities with a well established readership base.

=== Television ===
The SABC has a regional office in Gqeberha. Bay TV is a free-to-air station established by the Nelson Mandela Bay Municipality that broadcasts 24-hours a day, seven-days a week. The station focusses on African story-telling and creating platforms for local content creators, and receives funding from local government and corporate donors. The TV show Gqeberha: The Empire was set in the city.

== International relations ==
=== Twin towns and sister cities ===
- Beira, Mozambique
- Gothenburg, Sweden
- Jacksonville, United States
- Ningbo, China

== See also ==
- Anglican Diocese of Port Elizabeth
- Bloemendal
- Donkin Heritage Trail
- List of heritage sites in Gqeberha
- National Monument
- Red Location Museum
- Victorian era
