= Substance abuse prevention =

Measures to prevent the consumption of licit and illicit drugs

Rational scale to assess the harm of drugs

Substance abuse prevention, also known as drug abuse prevention, is a process that attempts to prevent the onset of substance use or limit the development of problems associated with using psychoactive substances. Prevention efforts may focus on the individual or their surroundings. A concept that is known as "environmental prevention" focuses on changing community conditions or policies so that the availability of substances is reduced as well as the demand. Individual Substance Abuse Prevention, also known as drug abuse prevention involves numerous different sessions depending on the individual to help cease or reduce the use of substances. The time period to help a specific individual can vary based upon many aspects of an individual. The type of Prevention efforts should be based upon the individual's necessities which can also vary. Substance use prevention efforts typically focus on minors and young adults — especially between 12–35 years of age. Substances typically targeted by preventive efforts include alcohol (including binge drinking, drunkenness and driving under the influence), tobacco (including cigarettes and various forms of smokeless tobacco), marijuana, inhalants (volatile solvents including among other things glue, gasoline, aerosols, ether, fumes from correction fluid and marking pens), coke, methamphetamine, steroids, club drugs (such as MDMA), and opioids. Community advocacy against substance use is imperative due to the significant increase in opioid overdoses in the United States alone. It has been estimated that about one hundred and thirty individuals continue to lose their lives daily due to opioid overdoses alone.

== Protective and risk factors ==
Environmental and internal are two main factors that contribute to the likelihood of developing a substance use disorder. Environmental factors in the individual's adolescence include: child abuse, exposure to substances, lack of supervision, media influence, and peer pressure. Drug activity in an individual's community may normalize the usage of drugs. The result of substance use can be caused due to stressful situations within household which can result of learned behavior of the is of substances to cope. Similarly. if an individual is placed through treatment and then placed back into the same environment that they left, there is a great chance that person will relapse to their previous behavior. Internal factors, which are personality-based or psychological, include low self-esteem, poor social skills, stress, attitudes about drugs, and mental disorders. A few more factors that contribute to teen drug abuse are lack of or poor parent to child communication, unsupervised accessibility of alcohol at home, having too much freedom and being left alone for long periods of time. Additionally, there is evidence that gender moderates the effect of family, school and peer factors on adolescent substance use. For example, some studies report that not living with both biological parents or having poor parent-adolescent communication is associated with substance use, especially in female adolescents.

Main risk periods for substance use occur during major transitions in a child's life. Some of these transitional periods that could increase the possibility of youth using drugs are puberty, moving, divorce, leaving the security of the home, and entering school. School transitions such as those from elementary to middle school or middle school to high school can be times that children and teenagers make new friends and are more susceptible to fall into environments where there are drugs available. One recent study found that by the time students are seniors in high school, "almost 70 percent will have tried alcohol, half will have taken an illegal drug, nearly 40 percent will have smoked a cigarette, and more than 20 percent will have used a prescription drug for a nonmedical purpose" (Johnston et al., 2013). Binge drinking has also, been shown to increase once an individual leaves the home to attend college or live on their own.

Most youths do not progress towards regular, heavy substance use after experimentation. Research has shown, when drug use begins at an early age, there is a greater possibility for addiction to occur. Three exacerbating factors that can influence substance use to become substance use are social approval, lack of perceived risks, and availability of drugs in the community. Youths from certain demographics are also at higher risk for addiction. These groups include those suffering from a mental illness and who comes from a family history of addiction. Yet, some teens living with dual diagnosis prove that there is not always a causal relationship between mental illness and a substance use disorder. Moreover, when addiction occurs, youth are more likely to require teen rehab as a form of treatment. Most young adults have a false perception that they may be invincible. These individuals believe changes won't be made until an extreme event happens i.e. a friend overdoses, a car accident or even death. Even then it is not likely that they will see the correlation between use and trauma.

Substance use includes risk factors that correlate to one's health that can include HIV/AIDS, Hepatitis B virus, and Hepatitis C virus. These viral infections can be easily be spread by injections from needles.

== Plans on preventing substance use ==
=== Family based prevention programs ===
"Prevention programs can strengthen protective factors among young children by teaching parents better family communication skills, appropriate discipline styles, firm, and consistent rule enforcement, and other family management approaches. Research confirms the benefits of parents providing consistent rules and discipline, talking to children about drugs, monitoring their activities, getting to know their friends, understanding their problems and concerns, and being involved in their learning. The importance of the parent-child relationship continues through adolescence and beyond" (National Institute of Drug Abuse, 2003). Research has been done showing that the measures taken within family prevention has been shown to reduce the risk of substance abuse.

Smit, Verdurmen, Monshouwer, and Smil conducted research analysis to measure the effectiveness of family interventions about teen and adolescence drug and alcohol use. According to their data, use of alcohol and other drugs is very common in Western societies. For example, 18% of the young adults between the ages of 12–14 years old in the US have indulged in binge drinking. According to quantities in 2006, 73% of 16-year-old US students were reported having used alcohol; In Northern Europe, this is 90%. Since early use of alcohol and other substances may cause serious health, immediate solutions to these problem are required .

=== School-based prevention programs ===
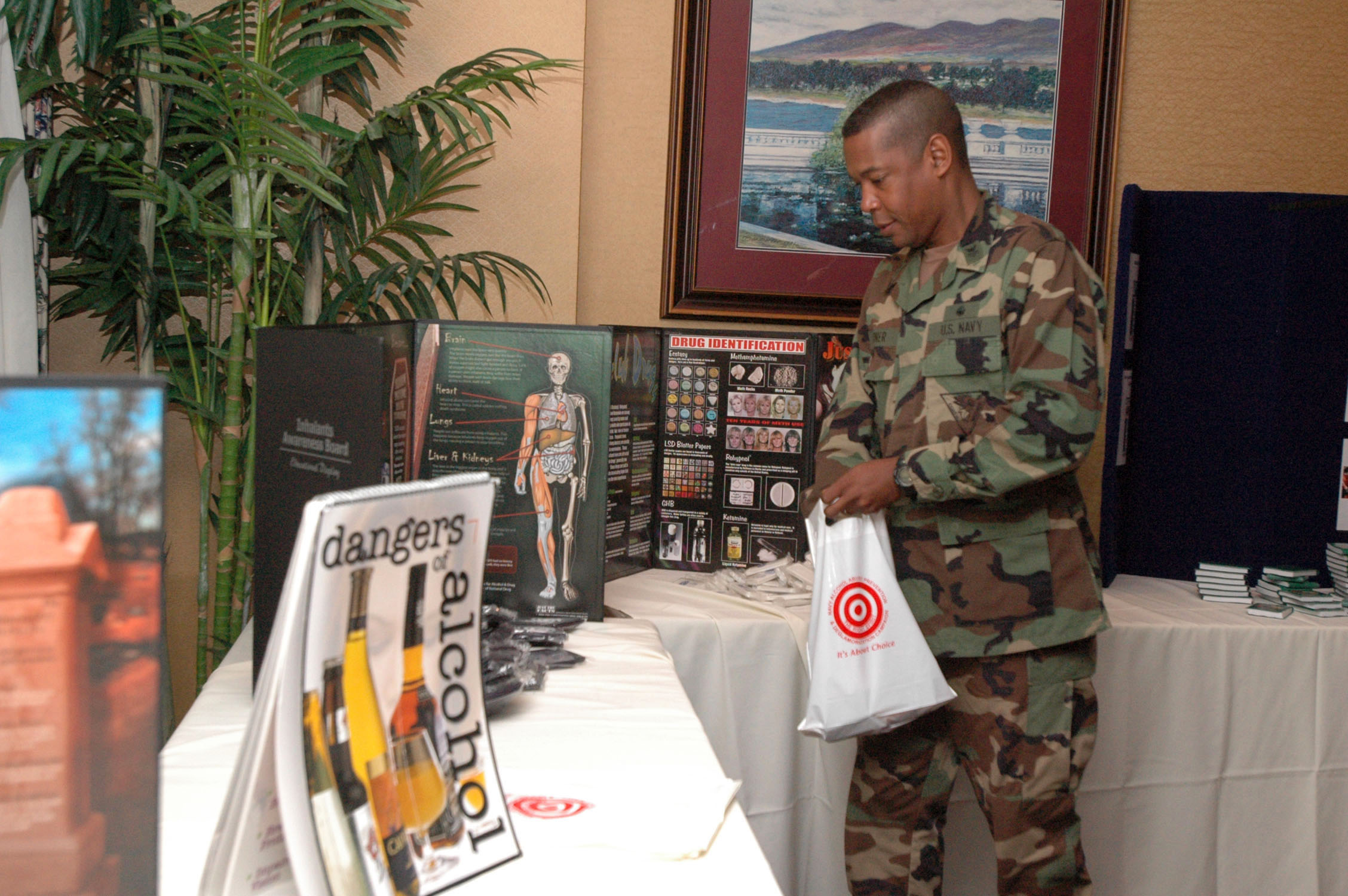
US Navy Master-at-Arms 1st Class Michael Turner of Mobile Security Squadron Two (MSS-2) collects information at the Substance Abuse Prevention Summit

Drama based education to motivate participation in substance use prevention. (media from BioMed Central)

There are a number of community-based prevention programs and classes that aim to educate children and families about the harms of substance use. Schools began introducing substance use-oriented classes for students as early as preschool. Incorporating prevention studies into classroom curricula at a young age has been shown to break early behaviors that may signal an increased risk of developing a substance use disorder. Around 40% of children have tried alcohol by the time that they are ten.

Many organizations educate, advocate, and collaborate to prevent substance use. Some programs may begin by allowing students to be interactive and learn skills such as how to refuse drugs. This is proven to be a more effective method than strictly educational or non-interactive ones. When direct influences (e.g., peers) and indirect influences (e.g., media influence) are addressed, the program is better able to cover broad social influences that most programs do not consider. Programs that encourage a social commitment to abstain from drugs show lower rates of drug use. Getting the community outside of the school to participate and also using peer leaders to facilitate the interactions tend to be an effective facet of these programs. Even though adolescents are frequently aware of the negative consequences of substance use, they may start and maintain this habit. Adolescents, their parents, and other family members are the focus of comprehensive preventive and control programs in schools and the community. These effective actions help promote children's development of a positive sense of self-worth and sufficiency, to stop adolescent risk behavior, and to help them build strong, healthy coping skills. Lastly, teaching youth and adolescents skills that increase resistance skills in social situations may increase protective factors in that population.

=== Community prevention programs ===
Prevention programs work at the community level with civic, religious, law enforcement, and other government organizations to enhance anti-drug norms and pro-social behaviors. Many programs help with prevention efforts across settings to help send messages through school, work, religious institutions, and the media. Research has shown that programs that reach youth through multiple settings can remarkably influence community norms. Community-based programs also typically include the development of policies or enforcement of regulations, mass media efforts, and community-wide awareness programs. Increasing health education in the community also plays a role in helping to decrease the consequences of substance use.

On a community level, established safe injection sites that provide a hygienic space supervised by licensed healthcare professionals allow for safe monitoring of participants and provide health education and care to prevent overdose. Another way to help prevent overdose, especially regarding opioids, is the increased access and knowledge of naloxone. Naloxone is the standard opioid overdose reversal agent. Studies show Overdose Education and Naloxone Distribution (OEND) programs decrease the rate of rate of deaths from opioid overdose. Naloxone comes in different routes of administration such as, an injection that's administered intravenously, intramuscular, or subcutaneously and a nasal spray. Naloxone injection and the nasal spray are both commonly used in adults and children who are going through drug overdose because it is successful in reversing the overdose effects As a safety precaution, patients taking opioids are recommended to always carry naloxone with them and should replace the naloxone regularly, via reference to the expiration date. Research has shown that extra effort in providing incentives, flexible schedules, personal contact, and the public support of important community leaders helps attract and retain program participants.

=== Medical-based prevention programs ===
Prevention within the medical field plays a large role in impeding substance abuse. This is largely seen when looking at the role nurses play in the opioid crisis in the United States. One program that nurses can get involved with regarding the opioid epidemic is medication-assisted treatment (MAT) system. This system is an evidence based approach that uses both therapy and medication to treat patients struggling with opioid addiction. Special training is required for nurses who want to participate in this program, meaning there are a limited number of nurses who can partake, however, it has greatly reversed the number of overdoses and deaths from opioids in the United States. Another type of program that nurses can assist in to reduce opioid addiction is called "eat, sleep, console." This is an approach that nurses can take when treating patients that can reduce which medications a patient needs and how long their hospital stay is. This is used for newborns that became exposed to opioids in utero, and it gives nurses the opportunity to educate their patients on how to reduce the side effects of addiction. Looking at it in whole, there are several different programs within the medical field that are used to treat substance abuse.

=== Levels of Prevention ===
There are three types of prevention which are all aimed to help reduce and or help deal with health problems that can be caused by substance use. The first intervention when dealing with substance use is primary use which involves ceasing the result of substances being used before it happens. Examples of primordial prevention include preventing the development of risk factors (e.g., depression) that increase a person's chances of developing a future substance use disorder. Examples of primary substance prevention would be the promotion of no interaction with the drug. Tertiary prevention is when the individual has to receive treatment for the substance that has been consumed. Examples include rehab & intensive outpatient therapy are examples of a few short-term preventions. Tertiary prevention involves an individual such as one suffering from substance use to receive treatment such as rehab or an intensive therapy but the process of recuperating will be longer due to the intense amount of intake within the body.

== National recognition of substance use prevention ==
In 2011 President Obama issued October as National Substance Abuse Prevention Month. It pays tribute to all people working hard to prevent use in communities and working hard to make a safer drug-free country.

Millions of Americans currently participate in Red Ribbon Week activities, according to the National Family Partnership (NFP)—the Red Ribbon campaign's national organizer. The Drug Enforcement Administration, a Federal partner in Red Ribbon Week, describes it as "the most far-reaching and well-known drug prevention event in America." Through the efforts of the NFP, other national organizations, Federal and State agencies, and communities, Red Ribbon Week has become more than a call to action. It has grown to be a unifying symbol of family and community dedication to preventing the use of alcohol, tobacco, and illicit drugs among youth.

In 2017, the FDA created the Opioid Policy Steering Committee (OPSC) to help guide FDA efforts in fighting this opioid epidemic specifically focusing on topics of new addiction, treatment support and development, assessment of risk over benefit and overall enforcement.

In the United States, there is a Substance Abuse and Mental Health Services Administration that provides a free 365 days per year 24-hour phone service. Their purpose is to provide information or therapy referrals to anyone experiencing substance use disorders or mental health issues. This national helpline number is (1800-662-HELP (4357)).

The NIH has made research-based guides available to help prevent substance use and addiction in youth. One guide speaks on prevention for early childhood. Another talks about prevention in children and adolescents.

Successful intervention programs typically involve high levels of interactivity, time-intensity, and universal approaches that are delivered in the middle school years. These program characteristics aligned with many of the effective program elements found in previous reviews exploring the impact of school-based drug prevention on licit drug use.

More recently, a $3.3 billion federal spending bill has been passed by Congress, which will be used to support prevention, treatment, and law enforcement activities, supporting state and local governments.

== See also ==
- 0-0-1-3
- Abuse prevention program
- Center for Substance Abuse Prevention
- Reach Out (non-profit)
- Education sector responses to substance abuse
