= 0-0-1-3 =

Alcohol abuse prevention program

0-0-1-3 is an alcohol abuse prevention program developed in 2004 at Francis E. Warren Air Force Base based on research by the National Institute on Alcohol Abuse and Alcoholism regarding binge drinking in college students. This program was a command-led collaboration between unit leaders, base agencies, and base personnel that utilized a three-tiered approach: (1) identify and assist high risk drinkers; (2) Develop a base culture, supportive of safe and responsible behaviors, including recreational options; and (3) Partnering with the broader community to promote alcohol prevention.

== Etymology ==
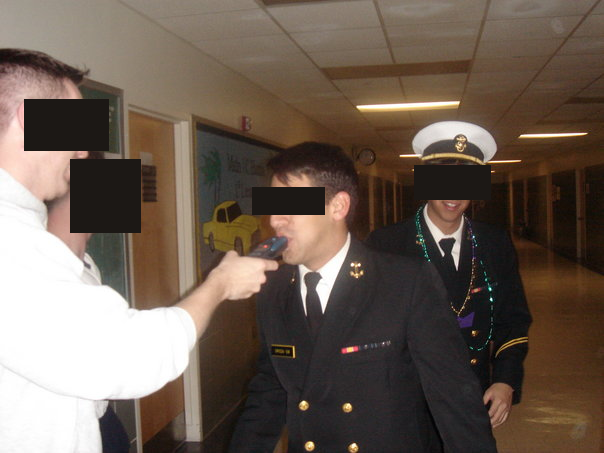
A Midshipman is subjected to a random breathalyzer test

0-0-1-3 stands for:

- 0 underage drinking offenses
- 0 drinking and driving incidents (DUI's)
- 1 drink per hour
- 3 drinks per evening

The first two numbers reflect the law. One drink per hour is approximately the amount the body can metabolize. Three drinks per night was selected as a target below the amounts recognized by NIAAA as binge drinking (4 drinks for women, 5 drinks per men). In both national research and at FE Warren rates of injuries, assaults, criminal behavior and other problems increase dramatically with binge drinking.

== Three tier approach ==
The first tier included screening of all personnel for binge drinking utilizing a measure such as the Alcohol Use Disorders Identification Test (AUDIT). Persons identified as possibly at risk were offered an alcohol screening consultation with the Alcohol and Drug Abuse Prevention and Treatment (ADAPT) program. Consistent with Air Force policy all active duty members who had alcohol-related misconduct incidents were also referred for evaluation. Based on evaluation results individuals were provided educational and motivational enhancement interventions, or if found to have a substance use disorder, entered into a treatment program.

The second tier included a primary prevention-level education of all personnel regarding low-risk alcohol use, hazards of binge drinking and illness, a social norming media campaign targeted and pilot-tested for both young adult and older adult groups, development and promotion of alternative recreational options, and use of disciplinary and legal consequences, among other actions. This included development of the name 0-0-1-3 as both a slogan and a guideline for low risk alcohol use. Personnel from the age range at highest risk for binge drinking, 18-25, were involved in development and execution of these actions.

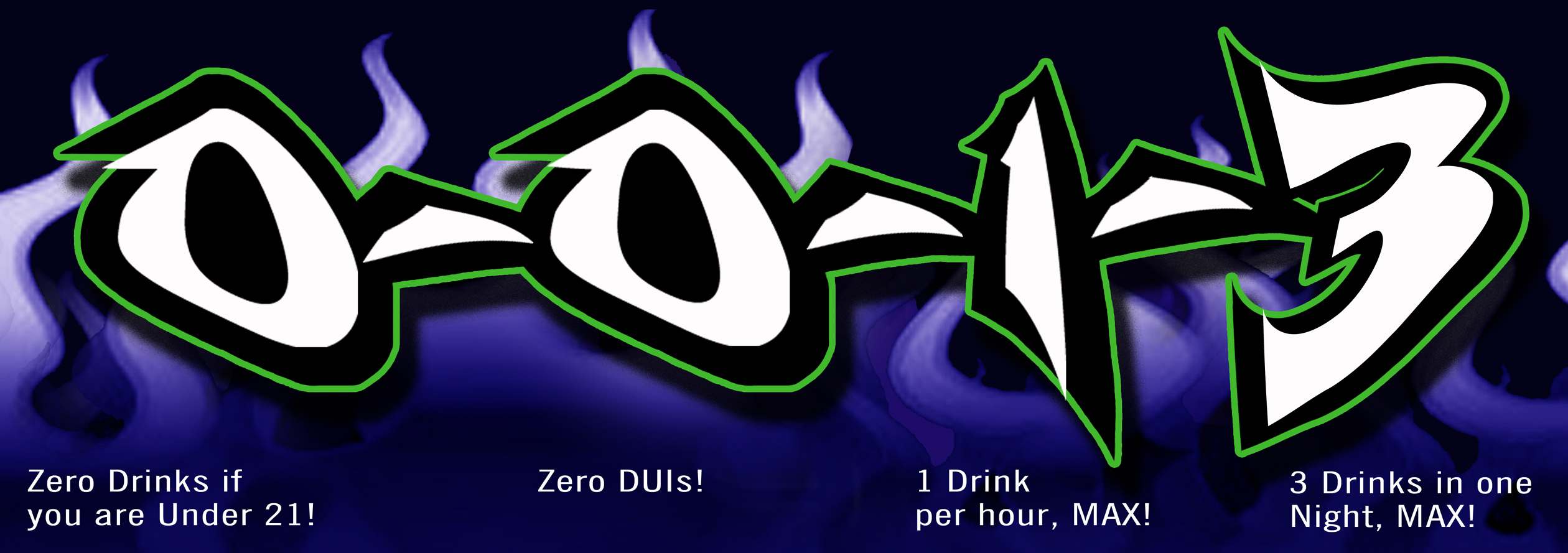
Phase-1 info 0013explain

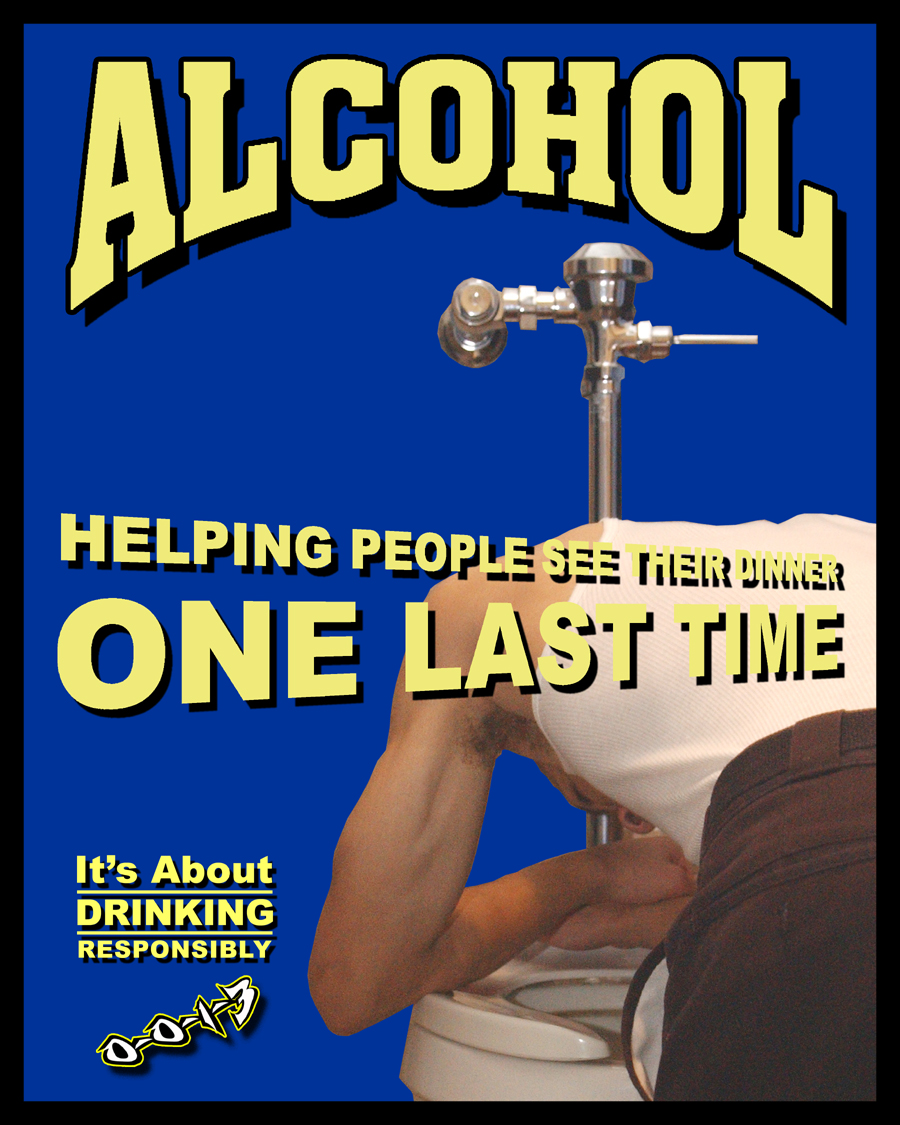
(BLUE) Puke

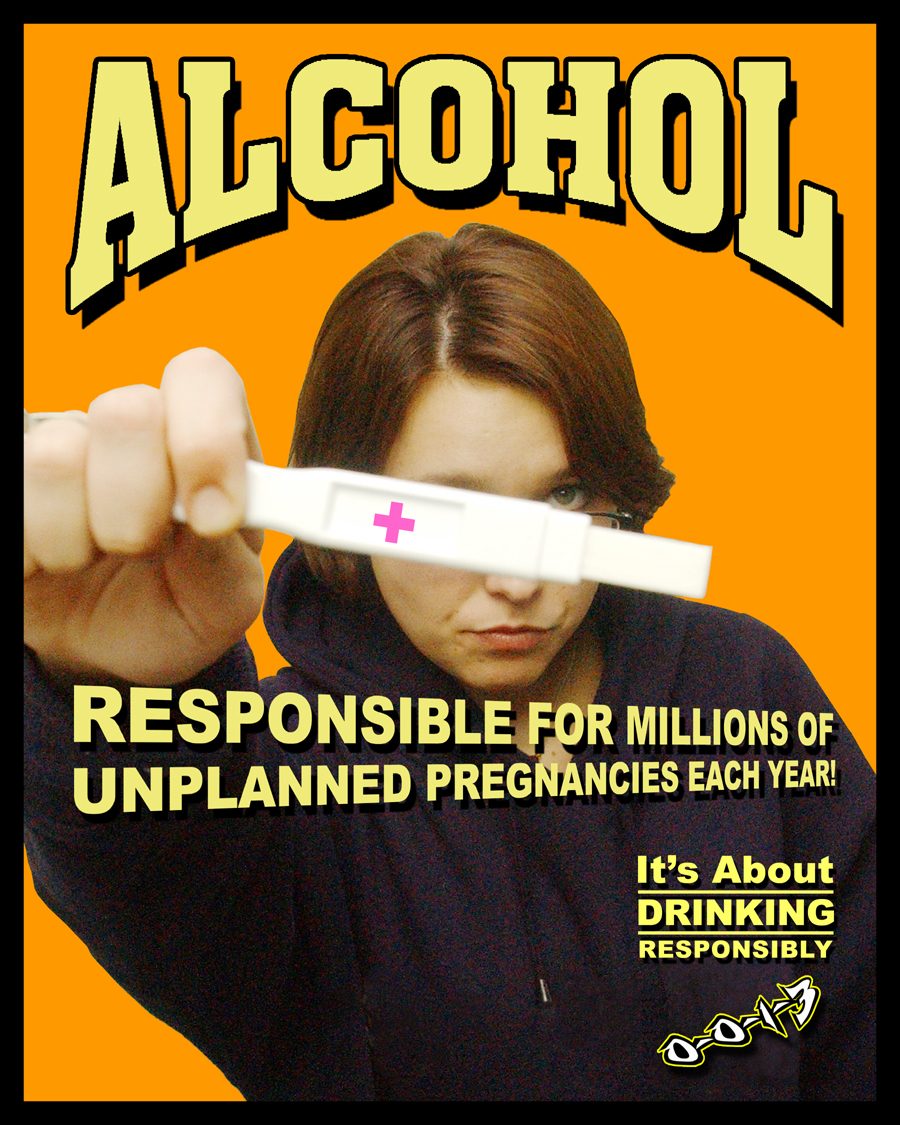
(ORANGE) Pregnancy

The third tier included partnering with the Wyoming Governor's Council on Impaired Driving and the Advisory Council for the Enforcing Underage Drinking Laws Program, as well as local law enforcement, the Chamber of Commerce, and others to promote responsibility and safety regarding alcohol beverage sales, service, and use.

== Initial results ==
Metrics collected in 2005 showed a "74% decrease in alcohol-related incidents such as driving violations, public drunkenness, domestic violence, sexual assault, thefts, and other infractions. The base also reported 81% fewer cases of underage drinking and 45% fewer drunken-driving arrests." Multiple other military bases adopted elements of the program including a grant-funded trials at five bases. The program served as the model for the Air Force's Culture of Responsible Choices (CoRC) program.

A 0-0-1-3 program was also implemented by the senior administration of the United States Naval Academy in response to a string of alcohol-related incidents that generated a large amount of negative publicity during the 2005-2006 school year. Its primary aim there is to "promote responsible alcohol use" within the brigade of midshipmen.

Although most health professionals recommend limiting alcohol consumption to 2-4 drinks per day for men, the three drink cap has contributed the most to its massive unpopularity among the brigade, as it is designed to ensure that no midshipman is able to achieve a blood alcohol content (BAC) level above the Maryland legal driving limit of 0.08 (even when not driving or operating machinery).

== Enforcement ==
While the senior leadership at the Naval Academy insists that 0-0-1-3 is only a guideline for responsible alcohol use, its enforcement involves mandatory, random breathalyzer tests for all midshipmen regardless of age or rank. Those found in "violation" of 0-0-1-3 (evidenced by having a BAC above 0.08) are placed on record as having alcohol abuse issues, and repeat offenders are subject to severe administrative infractions, up to and including expulsion. In contrast, neither the U.S. Military Academy (West Point) nor the U.S. Air Force Academy conducts random breathalyzers or punishes students simply for blowing above a particular BAC when not driving a motor vehicle.

== See also ==
- Alcohol advertising on college campuses
- Alcohol consumption by youth in the United States
