= Gqeberha Main Public Library =

Public library in Gqeberha, Eastern Cape

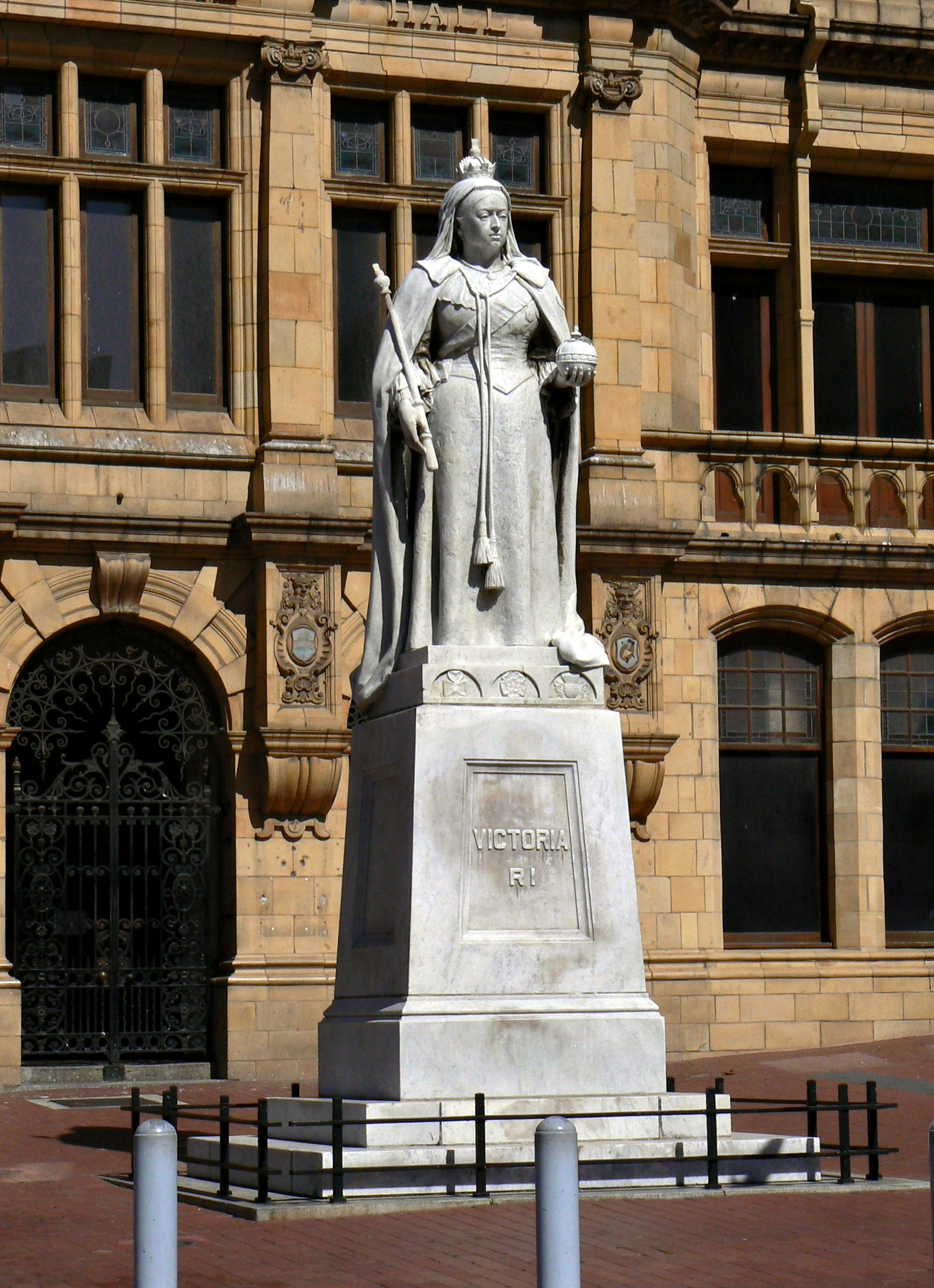
- 33°57′43″S 25°37′22″E

Port Elizabeth Main Public Library (now Gqeberha Main Public Library) is both a historic monument and public library. The building is situated at the northwestern corner of Market (renamed Vuyisile Mini) square in central Gqeberha, Eastern Cape, South Africa. With its granite stairs, imported terracotta facade and green Westmoreland slate roof, the "Savage Memorial Hall"" is the main Public Library in the region, intended for all the residents of the Nelson Mandela Bay Metropolitan Municipality.

== History ==
Public libraries have a long history in the Eastern Cape. In 1835, Sir Benjamin D’Urban offered land for a library in a public square. The library began to take form in 1844 as the "Port Elizabeth News Society", a subscription reading society housed above a shop in Jetty Street. In 1845, the reading room moved into a rented room in the Commercial Hall, and transitioned into a formal subscription library, occupying part of the Commercial Hall. Public subscriptions generated a yearly and the government gave an additional grant. A small bookshelf supplemented the selection of English magazines and UK newspapers. Through a shares system, the committee responsible for the library acquired the Commercial Hall in 1848, where the Library’s was housed. Port Elizabeth had a Public Library and Reading Room with 154 subscribers.

A fire occurred in the old court house and the library building was rented it out to the government as a Court house. The current public library got its own building (again) 54 years later when this library building was opened on 29 July 1902.

Planning for the current Victorian Gothic building began in 1885, when a £105 prize was offered for the best architectural design Henry A. Cheers won the award, and designed a building shaped like a Greek cross,William Savage's visage can be seen in one of the library's stained glass windows. Henry Cheers was an architect based in the U.K. With a statue of Queen Victoria in the forecourt, created by British sculptor Edward Roscoe The marble statue from Sicily depicts Queen Victoria in royal robes, wearing her small diamond crown. Her statue was erected and unveiled in front of the newly opened public library on 30 September 1903 by J.C. Kemsley, then Mayor of Port Elizabeth. The Statue was restored in 1992 by Anton Momberg, but vandalized again in 2015. as part of the "Rhodes must fall" campaign.

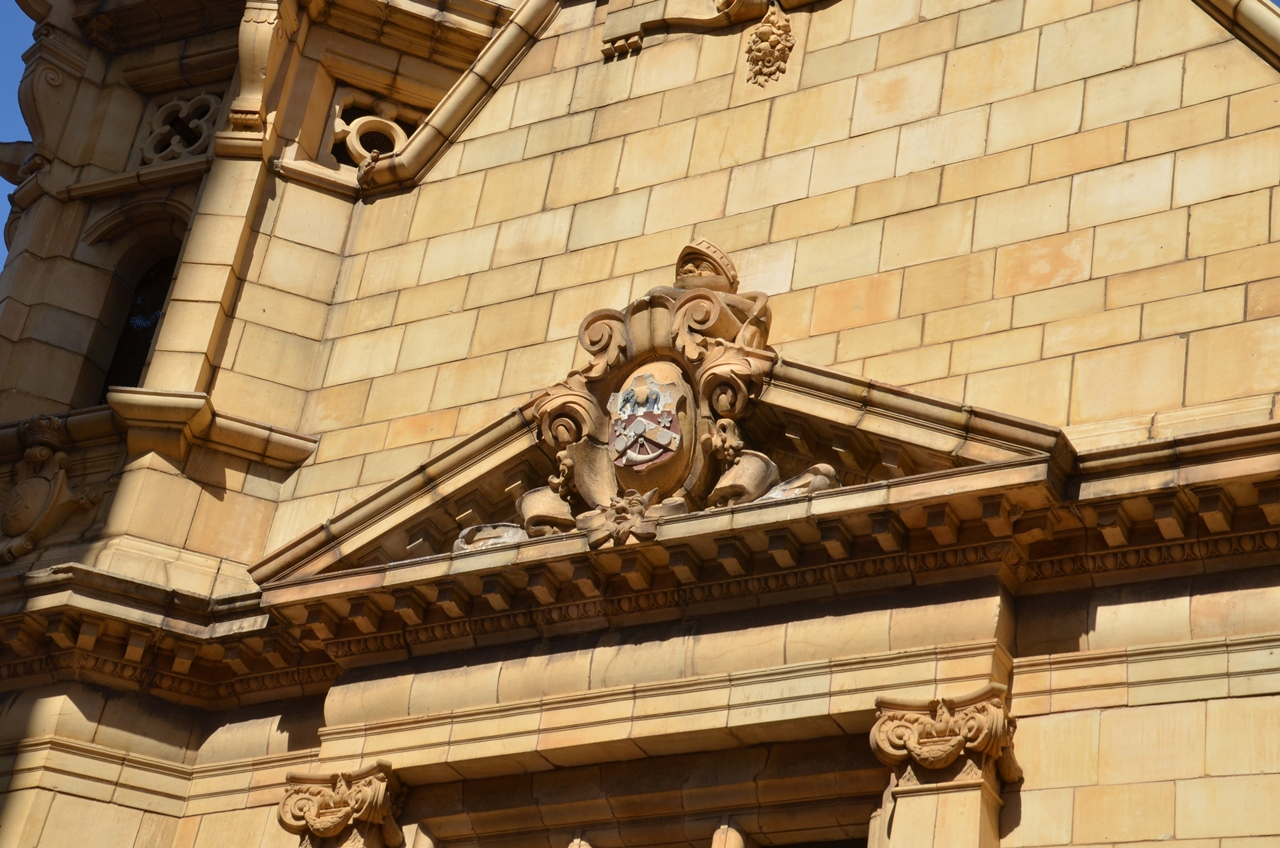
Port Elizabeth Library detail in terracotta facade of north face

The Library building has historical value and reflects the cities architectural under currents. Visitors can see and intricate decorative terrocotta facade, which was manufactured in England, shipped to Port Elizabeth in numbered blocks and meticulously reassembled, on site. Inside, the library has stained glass windows, ornate woodwork and a central atrium. It was declared a National Monument on 7 December 1973.

== Facilities and services ==
Services offered by the libraries (according to government sources): include:

- Extensive collection of books, audiobooks, e-books, and other materials
- Free Wi-Fi and computer access
- Study areas and meeting rooms
- Children's section with storytelling and educational programs
- Research assistance and interlibrary loan services

=== Events and programs ===
- Author talks and book launches
- Children's storytime and holiday programs
- Book clubs and literacy programs
- Exhibitions and displays on local history and culture

=== Operating hours ===
Since 2016, the operating hours (stated by official sources) are

Day	Hours
Monday	10:00 – 17:00
Tuesday -Thursday	09:00 – 17:00
Friday	10:00 – 13:00
Saturday	Closed

== Main library availability ==
Flooding in 2006 and then again in 2012, interrupted library services. In 2024, the library has been closed, to address leaks and water damage, and a multimillion-rand upgrade project, to restore and repair first the leaking roof has been undertaken. All libraries were closured due to Covid restrictions from March 2020 to August 2021 and in some cases certain library services were not restored, either because of vandalism. or because of national and regional management's tendency to close the many national, city and local libraries around the country for repairs.

While closed to the general public, the city has adopted a cruise strategy and the colonial building is opened to these tourists, so when Cruise Liners visit the city, they can take a shore excursion and view the marine life heritage in the library.

== Local Government Engagements ==
=== Main Library Friends ===
Concerned citizens and members of the association called Main Library Friends staged a protest at the Gqeberha City Hall on 29 March 2026, demanding that the renovations to the library be concluded so that it can be fully reopened to the public. Chair of the Main Library Friends, Graham Taylor handed over a petition to the Nelson Mandela Bay Municipal Council Speaker’s Office to relay their demands. Taylor has been instrumental in the campaign to get the library up and running again while hosting private tours to the facility during this them when renovations are halted as a result of municipal budget issues.

=== Oversight Visit and Intervention ===
Following ongoing interactions between the Main Library Friends with governance officials, an oversight visit and stakeholder engagement session was conducted by the Municipality through interventions by Member of the Eastern Cape Provincial Legislature Honourable JP Pretorius, joined by Nelson Mandela Bay Mayoral Committee Member Councillor Sinebhongo Kwatsha, wherein a commitment was made that local government would come up with a timeframe and plan of action to finalise the renovations and get the library functioning again.

== Satellite Library Services ==
In the rural areas of the eastern cape, newly established libraries are addressing a need. The picture is uneven and some satellite libraries and their buildings remain shut.
