= Mandela Bay Theatre Complex =

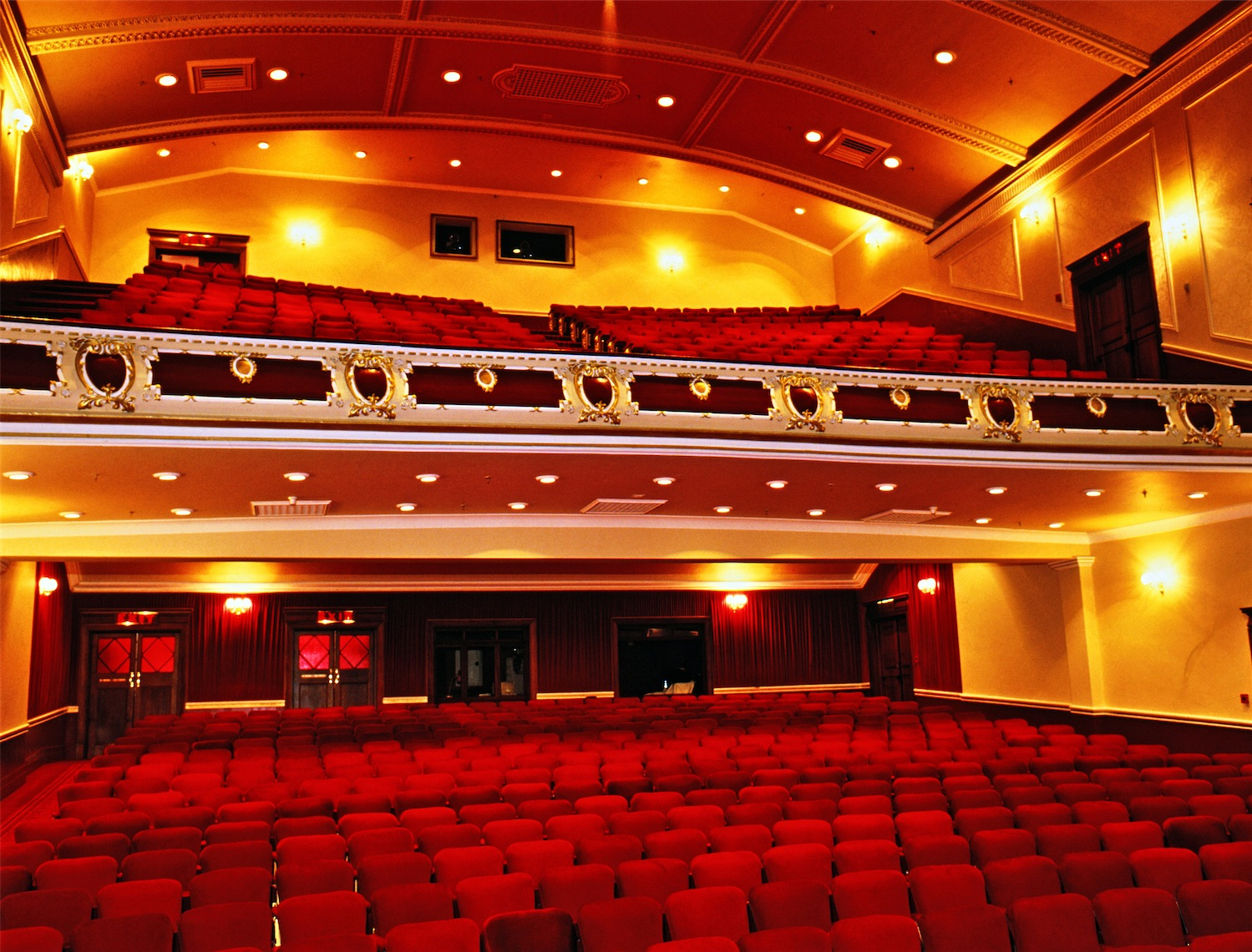
- Interior of the Opera House, circa 1988.
- Interactive map of Mandela Bay Theatre Complex
- Former names: Port Elizabeth Opera House

General information
- Classification: Provincial heritage
- Location: Gqeberha, South Africa
- Coordinates: 33°57′44.72″S 25°37′18.56″E
- Completed: 1892

Mandela Bay Theatre Complex, formerly the Port Elizabeth Opera House, (sometimes referred to as MBTC) is a theatre in Gqeberha, South Africa. It opened in 1892 and is a proclaimed a national monument since 1980. It is one of the preferred venues for performing arts in the Eastern Cape. It is the oldest theater in Africa and one of the oldest in the Southern Hemisphere.

The Main Stage was built for ballet, opera and bigger productions, like musicals and has 598 seats on two levels. Besides the main stage, there is a smaller, multi-function space called The Barn Theatre with capacity for 100 to 150 people, depending on the style of production. MBTC supports performing arts education and development programmes.

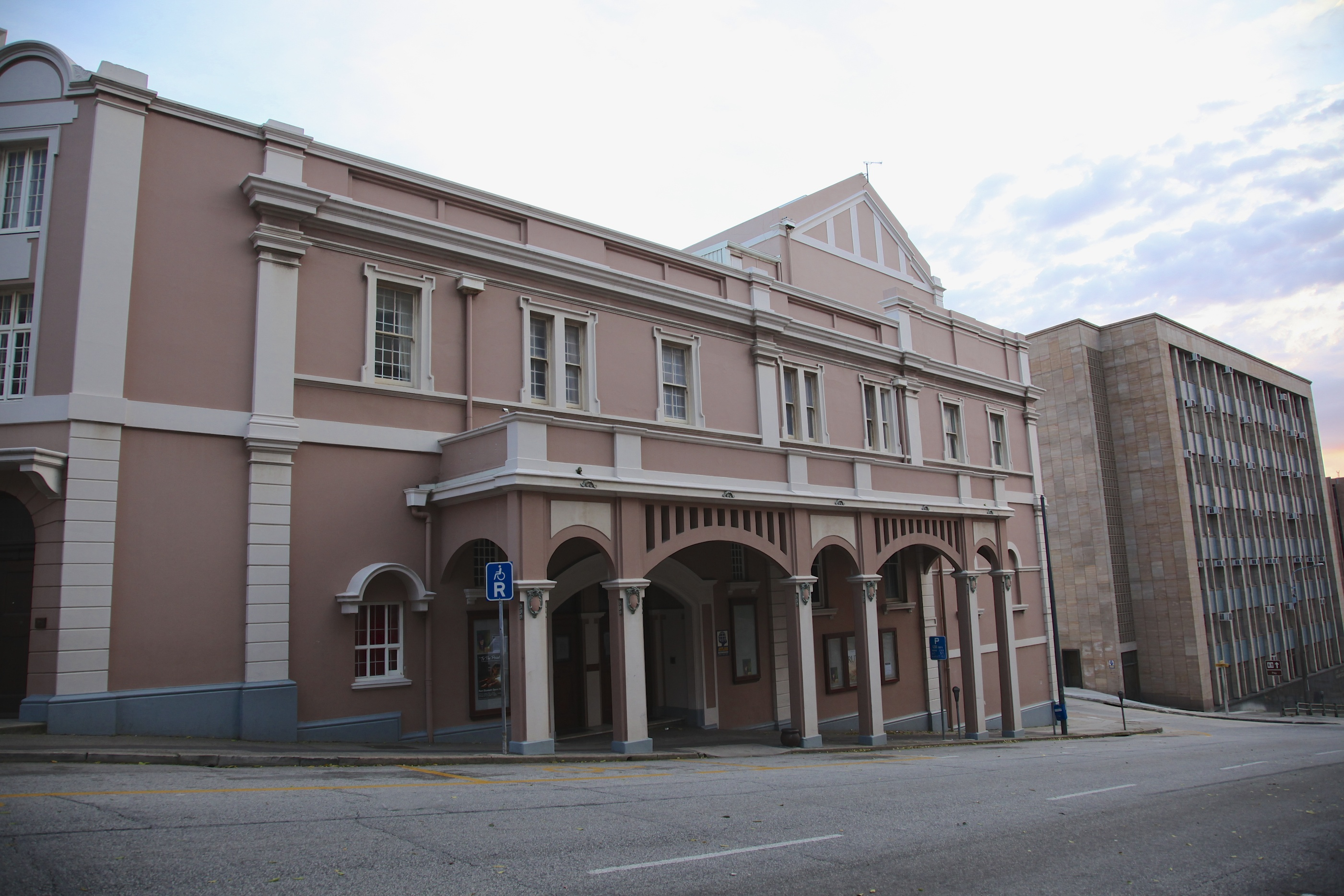
The Port Elizabeth Opera house exterior in 2012

== History ==
Built in 1892, it preceded the local railway and was initially lighted with candles and limelight for about 16 years, before gas lighting was adopted. It is the oldest and the last remaining Victorian theatre on the continent of Africa. Apart from various international performers and international ballet companies, South African performers like Athol Fugard, John Kani, Thoko Ntshinga, Winston Ntshona, and Elizabeth Connell have performed here.

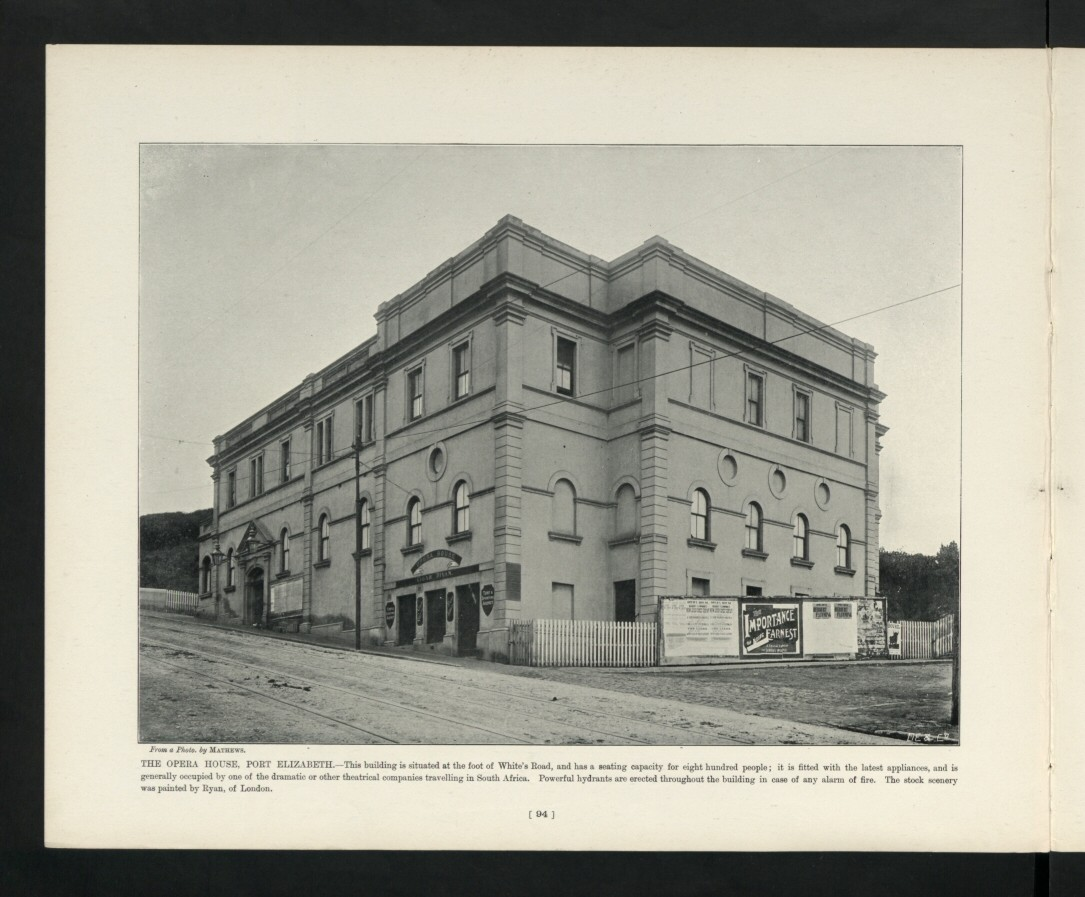
Early picture of the Opera house from the United Kingdom National Archives, date unknown, probably early Twentieth Century.
