= Bloemendal =

Bloemendal is located North of Port Elizabeth, in the Eastern Cape, South Africa. The neighborhood is part of Port Elizabeth's Northern Area.

Under Apartheid, the South African government separated each race and forced them into different townships under the Group Areas Act. Coloureds were moved to "'Bloemendal"' in the 1970s.

The area has experienced violent crime. In 2019, a 12-year-old girl was shot and killed in the locality after getting caught in the crossfire of a gang war. In 2023, three individuals, including one teenager were shot and killed in an instance of gang violence.
