= Abuse prevention program =

Program to prevent child abuse

An abuse prevention program is a social program designed to help parents and teachers recognize the signs of violence in an abused child and teaches how to explain abuse protection to them. These programs also help children in establishing self-esteem.

An alternate definition of abuse prevention programme describes those projects which identify risk indicators such as poverty, poor housing, inadequate educational facilities etc. and aim to reduce the impact of such indicators, either through social reform or through developing parents and children's coping strategies.

== See also ==
- Abuse
- Substance abuse prevention
