= Education sector responses to substance abuse =

Education sector responses to substance abuse refers to the way in which the education sector strategizes, developments and implements policies and practices that address the use of tobacco, alcohol, and other drugs in educational settings.

== Education response ecosystem ==
Within the education sector, there is a diversity of actors and systems to address substance use. These are elements of an effective education sector response which include

- A policy framework to prevent and address substance use among children and young people;
- National and/or subnational curricula (contents and methods for the delivery of those contents) including skills-based prevention education;
- Training and support for teachers, school health practitioners and other school staff to plan, develop and implement a comprehensive school-based intervention strategy;
- Evidence-based interventions related to curricula implemented in educational institutions;
- Evidence-based interventions related to the school environment implemented in educational institutions, including substance use policies in schools, as well as other evidence-based prevention interventions delivered in the context of educational institutions;
- School health services, providing both prevention and care and support for young people who use substances;
- Management, coordination and evaluation of the response in the education sector, including monitoring of prevalence of substance use among children and young people.

== Curricula ==
Substance use is one of several important social and health issues that society calls on the education sector to address through the curriculum, along with other behavioural prevention areas, for example, mental health, sexual health, nutrition and bullying. In a curriculum, substance use prevention education is usually and most appropriately accommodated in a health-related subject area (variously termed healthy active living, health and family living, health and physical education, personal and social skills education, health and career education, life-skills education, etc.).

Many schools choose also to supplement or replace the standard life-skills or other health-related curriculum with a manualized programme, i.e., a programme standardized through the creation of manuals and protocols for those who implement it. This has been shown by research to be effective in preventing substance use later in life and/ or supporting resilient mental health or acquiring life or academic skills.

Curriculum aiming to prevent substance use before the typical age of first use within the school system is directed at children who are around 6–12 years old. The typical age of first use of any substance will vary according to the national or local situation. Prevention education curriculum during this period is centred on what is referred to as 'skills-based health education'. It aims to develop key personal and social skills such as those that support healthy emotional and social development during this period, and protect against later substance use.

In addition to protecting against later substance use, skills-based education has also been shown to have a positive effect on general problem behaviours, commitment to school, academic performance, self-esteem, mental well- being, self-management and other social skills (besides Australia, Canada, Europe and the United States, the evidence also originates from Africa, Latin America and India).

== Training and support ==
Research has found that training increases the likelihood that a teacher will actually deliver skills-based prevention content, and do it in the way it was intended. Training can help teachers adapt programme methods to their own teaching styles and aptitudes, while retaining the core components of the programme.

== Evidence-based responses ==
At the school level, approaches to responding to substance use can be broken down into two categories: Universal prevention and selective and indicated prevention.

=== Universal prevention ===
Universal prevention aims to prevent substance use in the school population at large. This approach aims to reduce risks across the school or target age/ year group by providing knowledge and skills that are protective towards substance use, or by changing school policies and environment in ways that prevent and reduce substance use among all students.

=== Selective and indicated prevention ===
Selective and indicated prevention targets individuals or groups deemed at particular risk of initiating substance use or who are already involved in substance use behaviours. These approaches involve identifying at-risk individuals or groups and targeting prevention efforts towards them, or identifying those who are showing early signs of substance use and then intervening.

=== Mindfulness and stress skills programs ===
Schools are experimenting with mindfulness programs in classrooms to reduce stress and anxiety of students. Yoga and the practice of being present in one's environment provide a life-long stress reduction tool and improve social, emotional, and physical health. In addition to Yoga and Mindfulness, social emotional learning has been newly introduced into substance use prevention programs, with the goal of increasing self-awareness and reducing risky behaviors associated with substance use.

Previous drug intervention programs involved "just saying no", which offers no defense against temptation, other than a strong will to avoid peer pressure. Mindfulness and other stress-reduction techniques offer a tool that combats the need for drug use by teaching individuals how to process emotions effectively rather than numbing emotions or stress with substances.

In the United States, acceptance of meditation and yoga programs in public schools is needed, as there is some resistance from parents and those who feel these practices have religious origins, violating religious freedoms provisions under article 1, section 4 of the California Constitution guided under the First Amendment. In the case of Sedlock V. Baird, the Appellate court rejected Sedlock's claim of unconstitutional yoga teaching in the district of Encinitas, CA, deeming yoga as non-religious. These practices are worth pursuing in the education sector, as there is scientific evidence emerging of the health benefits, along with the argument that any reasonable students would not be swayed for or against religion through these exercises.

While mediation and yoga may be controversial, there is a strong case for some form of life skills training to strengthen teen's resistance to drug use. Mentor programs also act as preventative maintenance in guiding the youth away from maladaptive behaviors. A core issue of addiction is that it is often learned behavior from family exposure, and the cycle persists. Mentorship programs along with meditation, yoga, and social emotional learning in schools show great promise for breaking the cycle of addiction in families.

== School health services ==
School health services are most commonly led by nurses, but doctors, psychologists, psychiatrists, dentists, social workers and counsellors may also be involved. By virtue of their professional training, nurses are very well positioned to provide a central role with school-based health services and with substance use prevention. Their professional role permits them to:

- Provide prevention education in school (e.g. concerning non-medical use of prescribed medicines by children and young people).
- Identify and safely manage a new situation in the community (e.g. an emerging substance use pattern).
- Help families and teachers recognize signs and symptoms of substance use, as well as risk factors related to use (such as anxiety, depression or attention deficit, for example) and help them also in supporting protective factors against substance use such as resilient mental health.
- Identify and meet substance use-related needs of individual students and help students or families locate resources, and assist them in finding a route to specialist services.
- When trained, deliver brief interventions to students, an effective response to substance use (see Section 3.2.4) (Pirskanen et al., 2006).
- Identify and manage emergency situations (e.g. overdose) until relieved by emergency medical service personnel, and follow up with the health care provider.
- Provide advocacy in the community on issues of concern to the health of children and youth.
- Lead and train other school professionals or other school staff to be part of the prevention project and to deliver evidence-based content related to substance use within the curriculum.

== National education sector policies on substance use prevention ==
At the national level, education sector involvement is most effective in the context of a long-term integrated substance use prevention and control system or strategy that targets various ages and levels of vulnerability through a full range of sectors. A majority of countries have national policies or strategies/ action plans concerned with tobacco and the reduction of supply and demand of drugs, and many have a separate alcohol policy or strategy. However, the trend is toward comprehensive and balanced policies or strategies that integrate the various substances.

Current substance use control strategies increasingly understand substance use to be first and foremost a health issue that is best addressed through a range of demand reduction measures including early intervention; treatment; rehabilitation; recovery and social reintegration measures; and measures to minimize the public health and social consequences of substance abuse. All of these functions, including prevention, can fall within the purview of a public health system.

The national education sector derives a clear mandate to respond to substance use through policy language that typically calls the sector to take responsibility for promoting 'health and safety', 'healthy lifestyles' or 'life- skills' among students. For example, within the Eastern European and Central Asian region, most countries address the primary goal of substance use prevention by establishing education laws that oblige schools to build skills and foster a culture of healthy lifestyles and safe behaviour among children and young people. Within this context, national education sector substance use prevention policy has taken a number of forms, and can be categorized as follows:

=== Mandatory school substance policies ===
National substance policies may mandate school policies to prevent substance use and its health and social consequences within schools. This typically includes bans on substances (use, selling, and advertising) on school premises or surrounding properties. School rules relating to substance use often include the behaviours of teachers and other adults, and policies regarding dealing with substance use-related incidents.

=== Statutory health and substance use education ===
National education policies may enshrine the duty of schools to provide health and/or substance use-related education and training. Such training is often incorporated within other subject headings such as science or physical education, or in free-standing health or personal skills curricula. This often implies that prevention methodologies and contents are part of the mandatory teacher training.

=== School health services ===
National policies may mandate the implementation of school health services. These services allow for the provision of an accessible range of health services including preventive, routine, and acute health services for students. They may include a range of personnel, including school nurses, advisors and counsellors, and mental health professionals. The services provided often contribute to preventive education, the development of school health and substance use policies, early identification and interventions, and connections with the social and health sectors.

=== National quality standards ===
School substance use prevention can be encouraged and guided by quality standards. They are increasingly available (e.g. European drug prevention quality standards; Canadian Standards for School-based Youth Substance Abuse Prevention), and typically advocate for evidence-based programming, sound planning, and design, comprehensive activity, monitoring, evaluation, professional development, and sustainability. Quality standards help to support national policy initiatives and guide schools in meeting their mandate to promote health and prevent substance use.

=== Monitoring of substance use ===
Some countries participate in global or regional monitoring or conduct national-level monitoring of substance use prevalence among children and adolescents. This is not an education sector activity per se but it does indicate that the issue is a priority, providing a measure of endorsement and most importantly, guidance, for school prevention activity.

== International frameworks ==
A number of international statutes stipulate the responsibility of various sectors, including the education sector, to prevent and minimize harm from substance use among children and young people. Most relevant are the following:

=== International policy initiatives ===
International policy initiatives that enshrine the right of children and young people to health and safety:

- International Covenant on Civil and Political Rights (1966);
- UN Convention on the Rights of the Child (1989);
- Dakar Framework for Action – Education for All (2000), and Incheon Declaration – Education 2030: Towards inclusive and equitable quality education and lifelong learning for all (2015);
- Declaration and Plan of Action 'A World Fit for Children' (2002);
- UN Global Monitoring Framework (2013).

=== Recent policy conventions ===
Recent policy conventions focusing on the management of psychoactive substances and substance use:

- WHO Framework Convention on Tobacco Control (2005);
- Political Declaration and Plan of Action on International Cooperation towards an Integrated and Balanced Strategy to Counter the World Drug Problem (2009);
- WHO Global Strategy to Reduce the Harmful Use of Alcohol (2010).

=== International drug control conventions ===
Three UN international drug control conventions provide a framework for efforts to control the supply and demand for illicit drugs.

- Single Convention on Narcotic Drugs (1961);
- Convention on Psychotropic Substances (1971);
- Convention Against Illicit Traffic in Narcotic Drugs and Psychotropic Substances (1988).

=== Recent initiatives ===
Recent initiatives that may inform and mandate an education sector response:

- In the 2030 Development Agenda adopted in 2015, the UN Member States commit to strengthening prevention and treatment of substance abuse by 2030, in the subgoal 3.5.
- The Commission on Narcotic Drugs calls on 'Member States to formulate and implement, where appropriate, a broad system of primary prevention and early intervention based on scientific evidence, such as the International Standards on Drug Use Prevention and other measures, including educational activities and interactive campaigns'.
- The Outcome Document of the UN General Assembly Special Session on drugs, organized in 2016, highlights a balanced health- and human rights-based approach to addressing the world drug problem, giving an additional mandate to drug prevention and treatment.
