= South African Sailing =

Sailing (sport) regulator

South African Sailing SAS
- IOC nation: South Africa (RSA)
- Sport: Sailing
- Official website: www.sailing.org.za

AFFILIATIONS
- International federation: World Sailing (ISAF)
- ISAF members page: www.sailing.org/about-isaf/mna/south-africa.php
- Continental association: African Sailing Confederation (ASCON)
- National Olympic Committee: South African Sports Confederation and Olympic Committee

ELECTED
- President: Michael Robinson

SECRETARIAT
- Address: 9 Serrurier Street; Monte Vista 7460
- Country: South Africa
- Secretary General: Wendy Adams

The South African Sailing is the national governing body for the sport of sailing in South Africa, recognised by World Sailing.

== Sailing Clubs ==
- Saldanha Bay Yacht Club
- Knysna Yacht Club
- Stilbaai Yacht Club
- Redhouse Yacht Club
- Royal Cape Yacht Club
- Royal Natal Yacht Club

== See also ==
- Sport in South Africa
