= Disa forcipata =

Scientific classification
- Kingdom: Plantae
- Clade: Tracheophytes
- Clade: Angiosperms
- Clade: Monocots
- Order: Asparagales
- Family: Orchidaceae
- Subfamily: Orchidoideae
- Genus: Disa
- Species: D. forcipata

Binomial name
- Disa forcipata Schltr.

Synonyms
- Herschelia forcipata (Schltr.) Kraenzl.; Herschelianthe forcipata (Schltr.) Rauschert

Species of flowering plant

Disa forcipata was a perennial plant and geophyte belonging to the genus Disa and was part of the fynbos. The plant was endemic to the Western Cape and occurred at Knysna. The plant is considered extinct. One species of the plant was discovered in the Knysna area in 1870. The plant was never seen again after that.
