= KYC =

KYC commonly refers to know your customer or know your client, a set of guidelines in financial services.

KYC may also refer to:

- Killyleagh Youth Club, a football club in Northern Ireland
- Kyaka language of Papua New Guinea (ISO code: kyc)

== Yacht clubs ==
- Kaiserlicher Yacht Club, Kiel, Germany
- Kieler Yacht-Club, Kiel, Germany
- Kingston Yacht Club, Ontario, Canada
- Knysna Yacht Club, Western Cape, South Africa
