= List of heritage sites in Knysna =

This is a list of the heritage sites in Knysna, situated in the Western Cape, as recognized by the South African Heritage Resources Agency.

SAHRA identifier	Site name	Description	Town	District	NHRA status	Coordinates	Image
9/2/052/0001	Old Gaol, Queen Street, Knysna	Type of site: Gaol	Knysna	Knysna	Provincial Heritage Site	34°02′27″S 22°59′58″E	Type of site: Gaol
9/2/052/0002	Old Rectory, Plettenberg Bay, Knysna District		Plettenberg Bay	Knysna			Upload Photo
9/2/052/0003	Old Timber Store, Timber House Lot, Plettenberg Bay	As a result of Van Plettenberg’s visit and the glowing reports about the excellent forests around Plettenberg Bay, the Lords Seventeen instructed the authorities at the Cape to send a commission to inspect the forests of Outeniqualand and investigate the Type of site: Warehouse/storage area	Plettenberg Bay	Knysna	Provincial Heritage Site	34°03′24″S 23°22′38″E	As a result of Van Plettenberg’s visit and the glowing reports about the excellent forests around Plettenberg Bay, the Lords Seventeen instructed the authorities at the Cape to send a commission to inspect the forests of Outeniqualand and investigate the Type of site: Warehouse/storage area
9/2/052/0003-001	Van Plettenberg Beacon Replica, Plettenberg Bay	Type of site: Beacon	Plettenberg Bay	Knysna	Provincial Heritage Site	34°03′26″S 23°22′37″E	Type of site: Beacon Media related to Van Plettenberg Beacon at Wikimedia Commons
9/2/052/0004	Silviculturist Dwelling, Goldfield Forest Reserve, Homtini, Knysna		Homtini	Knysna			Upload Photo
9/2/052/0005	Silviculturist Dwelling, Witfontein Forest Reserve, Outeniqua, Knysna		Outeniqua	Knysna			Upload Photo
9/2/052/0006	Millwood House, Queen Street, Knysna	This historical cottage, built of wood and corrugated iron, is the only remaining building from the days of the discovery of gold at Millwood, Knysna which was proclaimed a gold field in 1886. Type of site: House; Previous use: House. Current use: Museum. This historical cottage, built of wood and corrugated iron, is the only remaining building from the days of the discovery of gold at Millwood, Knysna which was proclaimed a gold field in 1886.	Knysna	Knysna	Provincial Heritage Site	34°02′27″S 22°59′58″E	This historical cottage, built of wood and corrugated iron, is the only remaining building from the days of the discovery of gold at Millwood, Knysna which was proclaimed a gold field in 1886. Type of site: House Previous use: House. Current use: Museum. This historical cottage, built of wood and corrugated iron, is the only remaining building from the days of the discovery of gold at Millwood, Knysna which was proclaimed a gold field in 1886.
9/2/052/0007	Silviculturist Dwelling, Knysna		Knysna	Knysna			Upload Photo
9/2/052/0008	Silviculturist Dwelling, Concordia, Knysna District		Concordia	Knysna			Upload Photo
9/2/052/0009	Silviculturist Dwelling, Diepwalle, Knysna District		Diepwalle	Knysna			Upload Photo
9/2/052/0010	Silviculturist Dwelling, Harkerville, Knysna District		Harkerville	Knysna			Upload Photo
9/2/052/0011	Silviculturist Dwelling, Farleigh, Knysna District		Farleigh	Knysna			Upload Photo
9/2/052/0012	Wall Painting, Farleigh Office, Knysna		Farleigh	Knysna			Upload Photo
9/2/052/0013	Silviculturist Dwelling, Plettenberg Bay, Knysna District		Plettenberg Bay	Knysna			Upload Photo
9/2/052/0014	Holy Trinity Church, Belvidere	This imposing little church was erected mainly through the enthusiasm and financial assistance of Thomas Henry Duthie. The foundation stone of this building was laid on 15 October 1851 and the church was consecrated on 15 October 1855 by Bishop Gray. The; Type of site: Church; Current use: Church : Anglican.	Belvidere	Knysna	Provincial Heritage Site	34°02′42″S 22°59′50″E	This imposing little church was erected mainly through the enthusiasm and financial assistance of Thomas Henry Duthie. The foundation stone of this building was laid on 15 October 1851 and the church was consecrated on 15 October 1855 by Bishop Gray. The Type of site: Church Current use: Church : Anglican. Media related to Holy Trinity Church, Belvidere at Wikimedia Commons
9/2/052/0014/01	Old School, Erven 79 & 80, Belvidere, Knysna		Belvidere	Knysna			Upload Photo
9/2/052/0015	George Rex Mace, Knysna		Knysna	Knysna			Upload Photo
9/2/052/0016	St Andrews Church, Redbourne, Plettenberg Bay	A gravel road winds up the Piesang River Valley to the west of Plettenberg Bay, where it turns sharply to the right to mount a steep rise. A smaller farm road bears to the left and continues to follow the valley. The church was built in 1851 and is the oldest Anglican Church in the Diocese of George. In about 1846 William Henry Newdigate, a bachelor aged 21 years, came to South Africa from Warwickshire and bought a farm in the Piesang Valley (...). Type of site: Church. Current use: Church : Anglican.	Plettenberg Bay, Redbourne	Knysna	Provincial Heritage Site	34°03′00″S 23°22′00″E	A gravel road winds up the Piesang River Valley to the west of Plettenberg Bay, where it turns sharply to the right to mount a steep rise. A smaller farm road bears to the left and continues to follow the valley. The church was built in 1851 and is the oldest Anglican Church in the Diocese of George. In about 1846 William Henry Newdigate, a bachelor aged 21 years, came to South Africa from Warwickshire and bought a farm in the Piesang Valley (...). Type of site: Church. Current use: Church : Anglican.
9/2/052/0017	Griqua Dwelling, Jackalskraal, Kranshoek, Knysna District		Kranshoek	Knysna	National Monument		Upload Photo
9/2/052/0018	School Building, Kranshoek, Knysna District		Kranshoek	Knysna	Pending Declaration		Upload Photo
9/2/052/0019	Griqua Independent Church of South Africa, Kranshoek, Knysna District		Kranshoek	Knysna			Upload Photo
9/2/052/0020	KNYSNA MUNICIPAL AREA, GENERAL		Knysna	Knysna			Upload Photo
9/2/052/0022	Knysna Heads, Knysna		Knysna	Knysna		34°04′27″S 23°03′50″E	
9/2/052/0022/001	Erf 1403, Eastern Head, Knysna	This property is of importance because of its natural beauty; it forms part of the well-known Knysna Heads.	Knysna	Knysna	Provincial Heritage Site	34°02′06″S 23°02′47″E	This property is of importance because of its natural beauty; it forms part of the well-known Knysna Heads.
9/2/052/0022/2	Erf 1406, Eastern Head, Knysna	This property is of importance because of its natural beauty; it forms part of the well known Knysna Heads.	Knysna	Knysna	Provincial Heritage Site	34°02′06″S 23°02′47″E	This property is of importance because of its natural beauty; it forms part of the well known Knysna Heads.
9/2/052/0022/3	Erf 2238, Eastern Head, Knysna		Knysna	Knysna			Upload Photo
9/2/052/0022/4	Erf 1404, Knysna Heads, Knysna		Knysna	Knysna			Upload Photo
9/2/052/0022/5	Erf 4869, Knysna Heads, Knysna		Knysna	Knysna			Upload Photo
9/2/052/0023	PLETTENBERG BAY MUNICIPAL AREA, KNYSNA DISTRICT, GENERAL		Plettenberg Bay	Knysna			Upload Photo
9/2/052/0024	Settlement of the survivors of the Sao Gonzalo, Plettenberg Bay		Plettenberg Bay	Knysna			Upload Photo
9/2/052/0025	George Rex Slipway, Farm Westford, Knysna		Knysna	Knysna			Upload Photo
9/2/052/0026	Forest Hall, Knysna District	Type of site: House		Knysna	Provincial Heritage Site	34°00′52″S 23°03′15″E	Upload Photo
9/2/052/0027	Belvidere House, Belvidere		Belvidere	Knysna	Provincial Heritage Site	34°02′51″S 22°59′52″E	Upload Photo
9/2/052/0028	Formosa Cottage, Plettenberg Bay, Knysna District		Plettenberg Bay	Knysna			Upload Photo
9/2/052/0029	Robberg Nature Reserve, Plettenberg Bay	Type of site: Nature Reserve The land at the base of Robberg is rich in cultural history, especially from the Late Stone Age and the seventeenth-century settlement of survivors of the wreck of the Sao Goncalo. Environmentally it is of great importance as a buffer zone to the Robber	Plettenberg Bay	Knysna	Provincial Heritage Site	34°06′19″S 23°23′45″E	Type of site: Nature Reserve The land at the base of Robberg is rich in cultural history, especially from the Late Stone Age and the seventeenth-century settlement of survivors of the wreck of the Sao Goncalo. Environmentally it is of great importance as a buffer zone to the Robber
9/2/052/0030	Knysna Fort, Knysna	Type of site: Blockhouse	Knysna	Knysna	Provincial Heritage Site	34°01′56″S 23°02′38″E	Type of site: Blockhouse
9/2/052/0031	Hillview, Plettenberg Bay, Knysna District		Plettenberg Bay	Knysna			Upload Photo
9/2/052/0032	Public Library, Main Road, Knysna	Type of site: Library	Knysna	Knysna	Provincial Heritage Site	34°02′10″S 23°02′27″E	Type of site: Library
9/2/052/0033	Grave of George Rex, Knysna		Knysna	Knysna			
9/2/052/0034	St George's Church, Church Street, Knysna	In 1828 the Government under Lord Charles Somerset drew up plans for a village on a portion of George Rex’s estate, which eventually developed into Knysna. Facing the road which later became the main street, George Rex gave a morgen of land (0,8 ha) as a Type of site: Church; Current use: Church : Anglican. This was the first church built in Knysna. The foundation stone was laid in 1849 and the church was consecrated by Bishop Robert Gray on 3 October 1855.	Knysna	Knysna	Provincial Heritage Site	34°02′07″S 23°03′02″E	In 1828 the Government under Lord Charles Somerset drew up plans for a village on a portion of George Rex’s estate, which eventually developed into Knysna. Facing the road which later became the main street, George Rex gave a morgen of land (0,8 ha) as a Type of site: Church Current use: Church : Anglican. This was the first church built in Knysna. The foundation stone was laid in 1849 and the church was consecrated by Bishop Robert Gray on 3 October 1855. Media related to St George's Church, Knysna at Wikimedia Commons
9/2/052/0035	Silviculturist Dwelling, Kaffirkop, Knysna District		Knysna	Knysna			Upload Photo
9/2/052/0036	WITTEDRIFT VILLAGE, KNYSNA DISTRICT, GENERAL		Knysna	Knysna			Upload Photo
9/2/052/0038	A A S le Fleur Monument, Monument Street, Kranshoek, Plettenberg Bay		Plettenberg Bay	Knysna			Upload Photo
9/2/052/0039	Grave of A A S le Fleur, Plettenberg Bay		Plettenberg Bay	Knysna			Upload Photo
9/2/052/0040	Thesen's Island, Knysna		Knysna	Knysna		34°02′43″S 23°02′54″E	Upload Photo
9/2/052/0041	The Queen's Warehouse, Long Street, Knysna		Knysna	Knysna			
9/2/052/0042	Knysna Quays Development, Knysna		Knysna	Knysna		34°02′26″S 23°02′42″E	Upload Photo
9/2/052/0043	KNYSNA MAGISTERIAL DISTRICT, GENERAL		Knysna	Knysna			Upload Photo
9/2/052/0044	Railway Station Building, Rex Street, Knysna		Knysna	Knysna			Upload Photo
9/2/052/0045	KRANSHOEK LOCAL AREA, GENERAL		Kranshoek	Knysna			Upload Photo
9/2/052/0046	BELVIDERE LOCAL AREA, GENERAL		Belvidere	Knysna			Upload Photo
9/2/052/0047	East Guanogat Cave, Robberg Peninsula, Plettenberg Bay		Plettenberg Bay	Knysna			
9/2/052/0048	Westford, Farm 191, Knysna District		Knysna	Knysna			Upload Photo
