= Knysna River =

Coordinates: 34°04′56″S 23°03′37″E

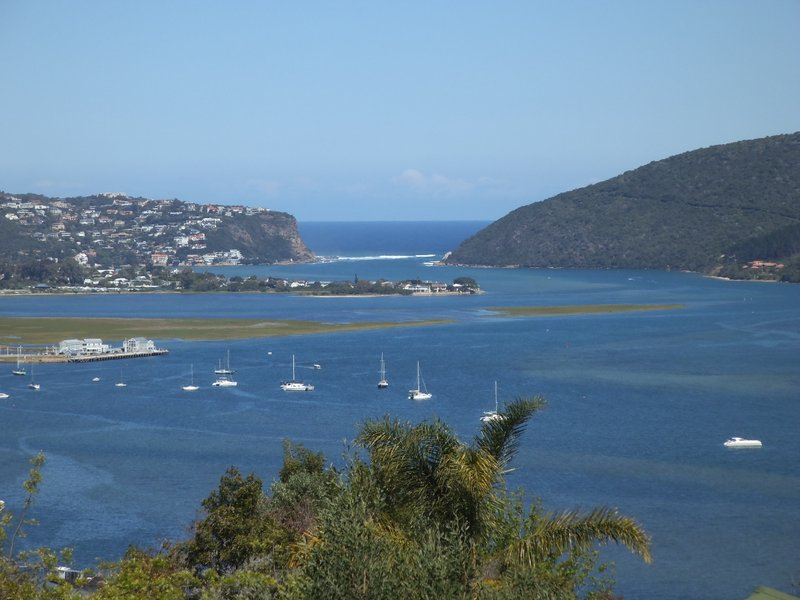
- View of the Knysna River estuary

Location
- Country: South Africa

Physical characteristics
- Length: 40 km (25 mi)

The Knysna River (in Afrikaans: Knysnarivier) is a river flowing in the Western Cape province in South Africa. It has its source in the Outeniqua Mountains, in the district of Eden, then it goes towards the Indian Ocean, in which it opens with a large estuary, where is located the town of Knysna, which takes its name from the river. Its course, 40 km long, is navigable only in its final part.

The mouth of the river is called The Heads.

The name Knysna has appeared in various spellings since around the 1770s. It was referred as 'Nysna' in one of the first letters of James Callander, a Scottish seamaster, sent by the colonial government of the Cape in 1798 to survey and report on the forests, bays and rivers of the region. He builds for himself a house at The Heads. He draws the first map of the Knysna River "Chart of the Knysna, An Arm of the Sea, Seven Leagues to the Westward of Plettenberg's Bay" and expresses his opinion that the Knysna is far superior to Plettenberg Bay as an outlet for the shipment of timber.
