= Rob Still =

South African business magnate

- Born: 1955 (age 70–71); Johannesburg, Union of South Africa
- Education: University of Witwatersrand (BCom)
- Occupations: farmer; mining magnate; accountant
- Known for: Producer of world-renowned olive oil

Robert Still (born 1955) is a South African business magnate involved in mining and agriculture. His De Rustica estate produces what has been awarded as the world's best olive oil.

== Biography ==
Born in Johannesburg, Still graduated from University of the Witwatersrand with a Bachelor of Commerce in 1978 and became a chartered accountant in 1980. He started his career as a partner in Ernst & Whinney, a predecessor to Ernst & Young. He entered the mining industry around 1986 to found Rhombus Exploration and became a successful mining entrepreneur. Since then, he has served as chairman and chief executive officer of Southern Mining, a JSE-listed firm. He is also the chief executive of Pangea Exploration.

Still founded De Rustica Olive Estate in 2006, and the company first sold olive oil in 2012. During that time, 4,000 hectares (10,000 acres, 40 km2) of farmland was acquired in Knysna and 75,000 olive trees were planted. Since its foundation, De Rustica has won multiple awards in the olive oil industry.
