= Pledge Nature Reserve =

Nature reserve in Knysna, South Africa

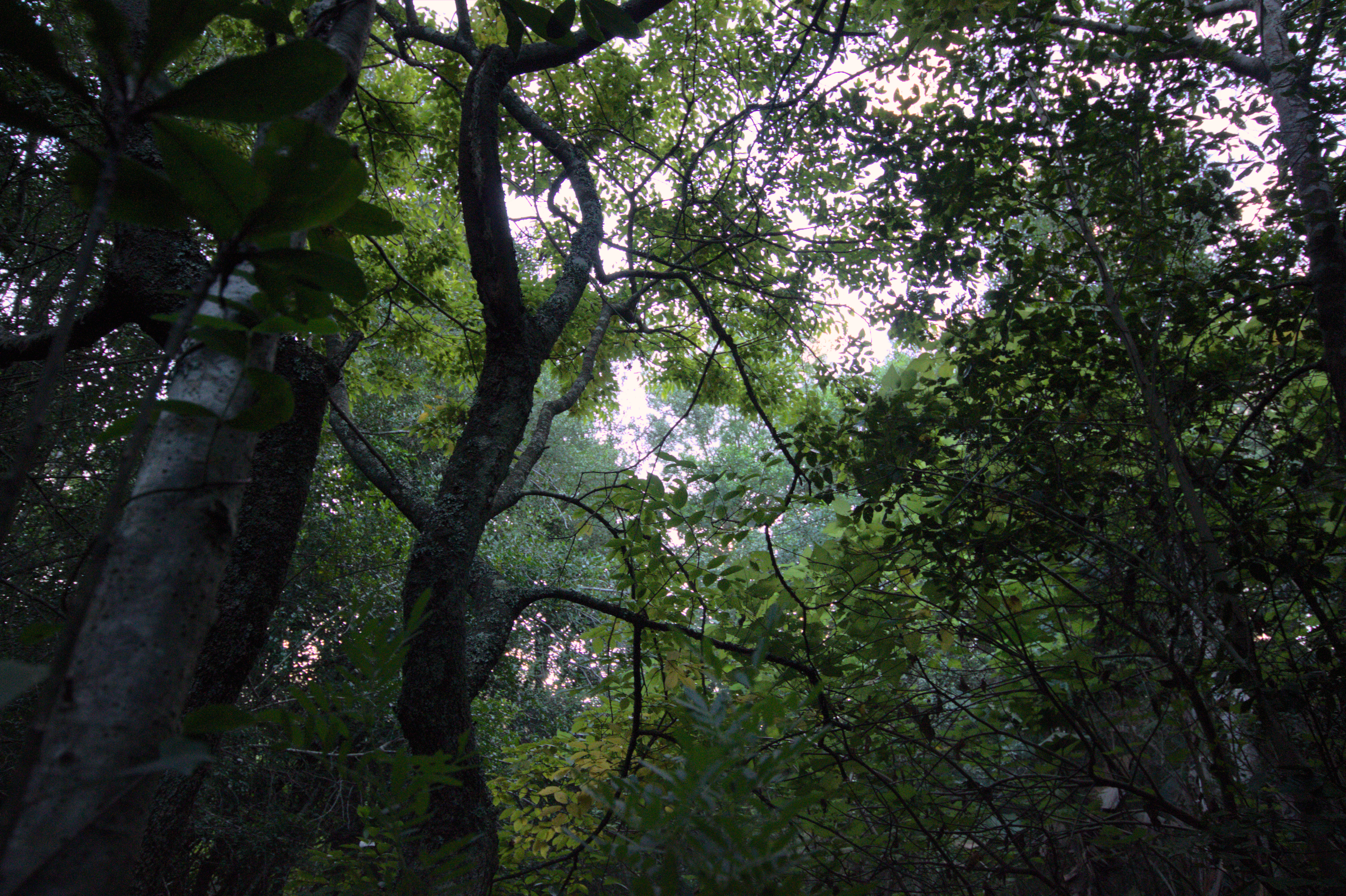
- View on a walking trail in the forest of the reserve
- Location of the reserve within Knysna town
- Location: Western Cape, South Africa
- Nearest city: Knysna
- Coordinates: 34°01′58.8″S 23°02′40.6″E
- Area: 0.1070230 km^{2} (0.0413218 sq mi)
- Established: 11 October 1991
- Governing body: Pledge Nature Reserve Trust; Knysna Local Municipality
- Website: pledgenaturereserve.org

Pledge Nature Reserve is a declared nature reserve located in the town of Knysna in the Garden Route district of the Western Cape province in southwestern South Africa. The reserve covers ten hectares adjacent to the town center and is accessible via Fitchat Street, parallel to the N2 highway. The area which is now Pledge Nature Reserve has a long history of use by the townspeople and Knysna division of the Girl Guides South Africa, and the Brownie movement. However, the area was only established as a Local Nature Reserve in the Government Gazette of South Africa Notice 726 on 11 October 1991. The reserve is administered by a voluntary trust, the Pledge Nature Reserve Trust, and an appointed voluntary management committee, who were granted a 99-year lease by the Knysna Local Municipality.

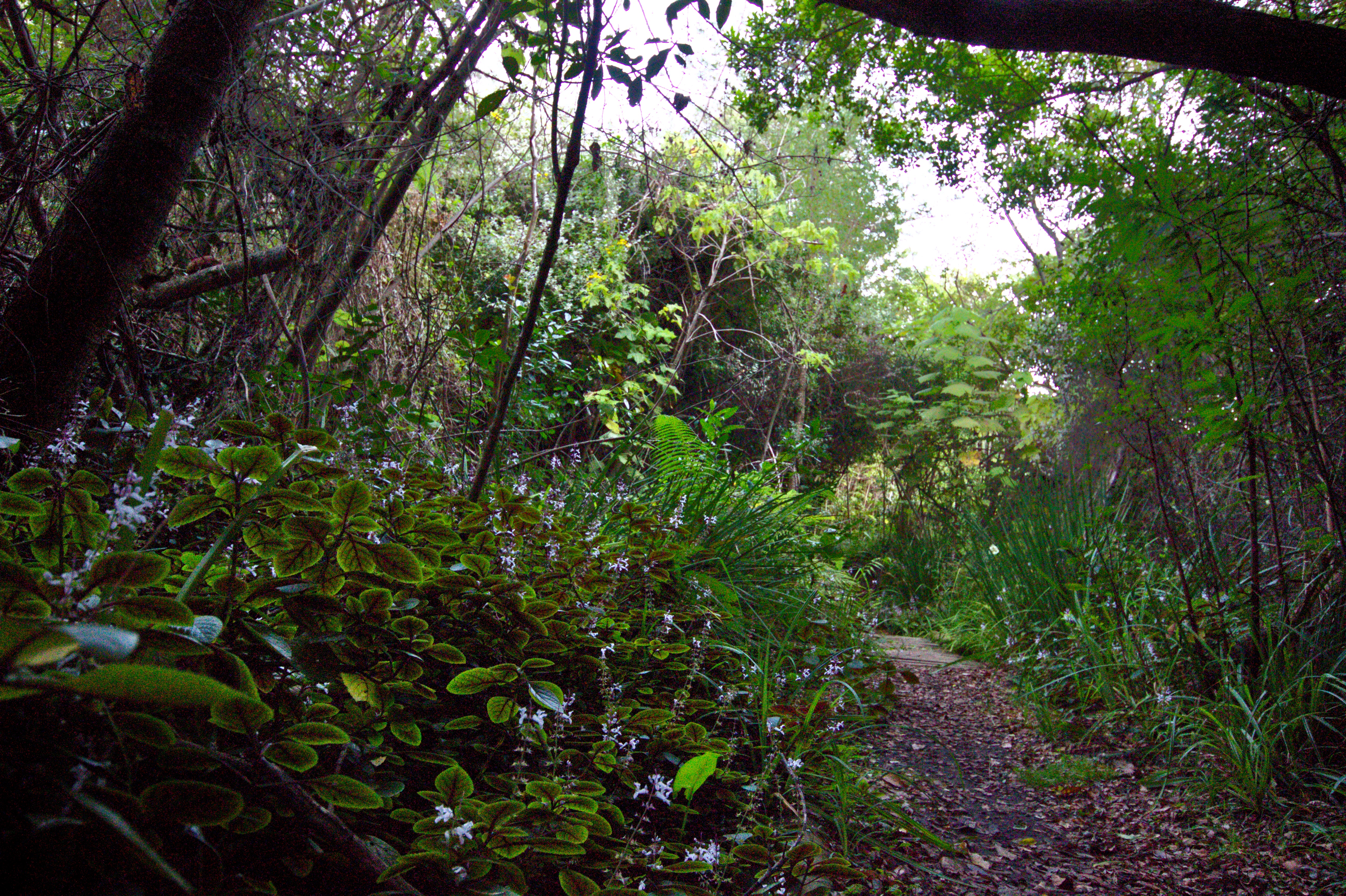
Forest walking trails in the reserve

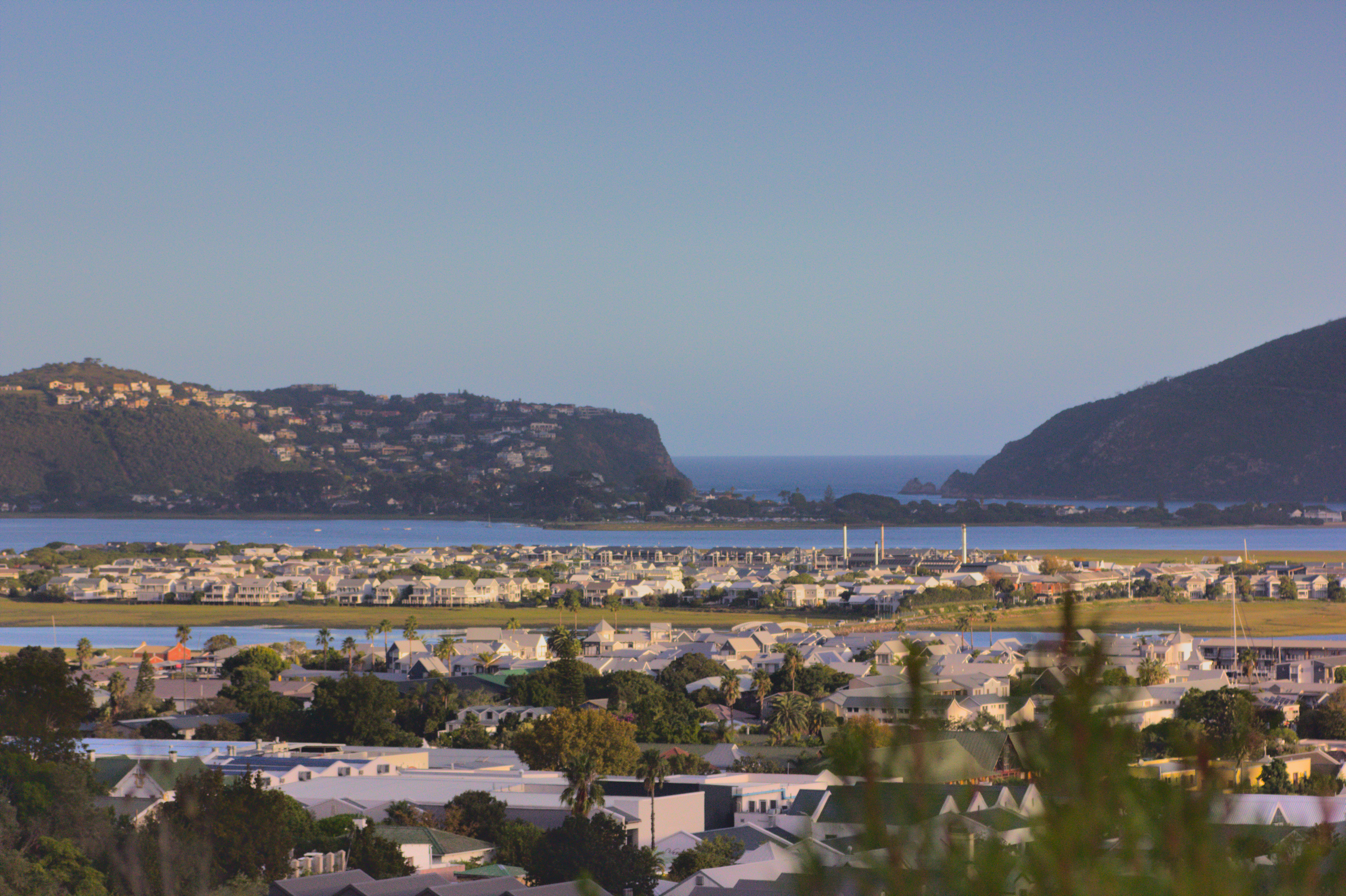
View from the top of the reserve, at the designated viewpoint, showing the Knysna Heads and Thesen's Island

The reserve is surrounded by urban development but the area has historically been left undeveloped due to its steep hills and valleys, even since the inception of Knysna town during the times of George Rex. The vegetation in the reserve consists of an endangered Fynbos vegetation type, with remnants of Knysna–Amatole montane forests. Natural streams flow from the hills into two artificial ponds, created after the area's establishment as a nature reserve. The reserve maintains many short walking trails which are accessible to visitors, as well as picnic tables, benches, and a viewpoint of the Knysna Heads.

The Fynbos vegetation burned during the Knysna fires of June 2017. The vegetation has since recovered and regenerated.

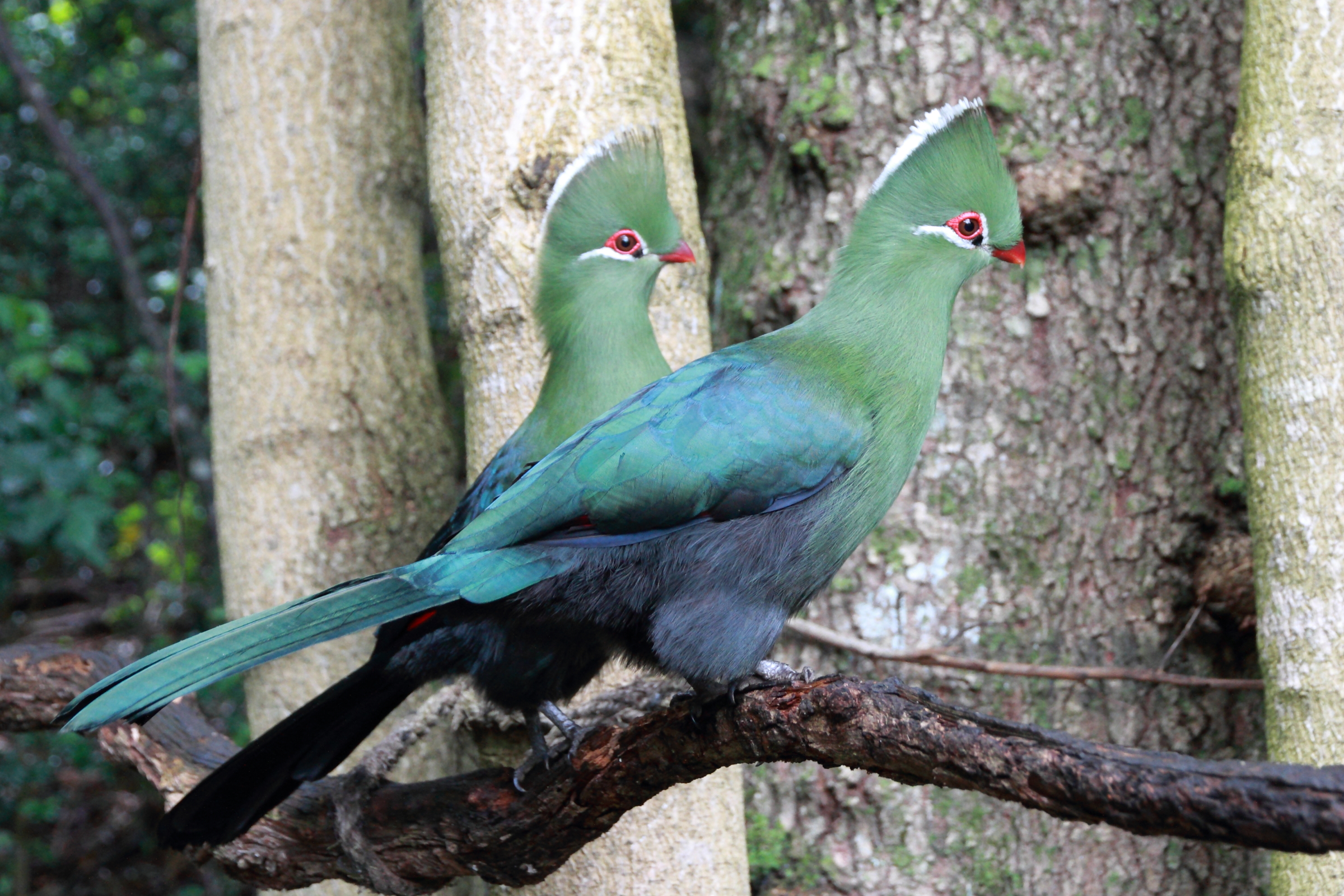
Knysna Turacos

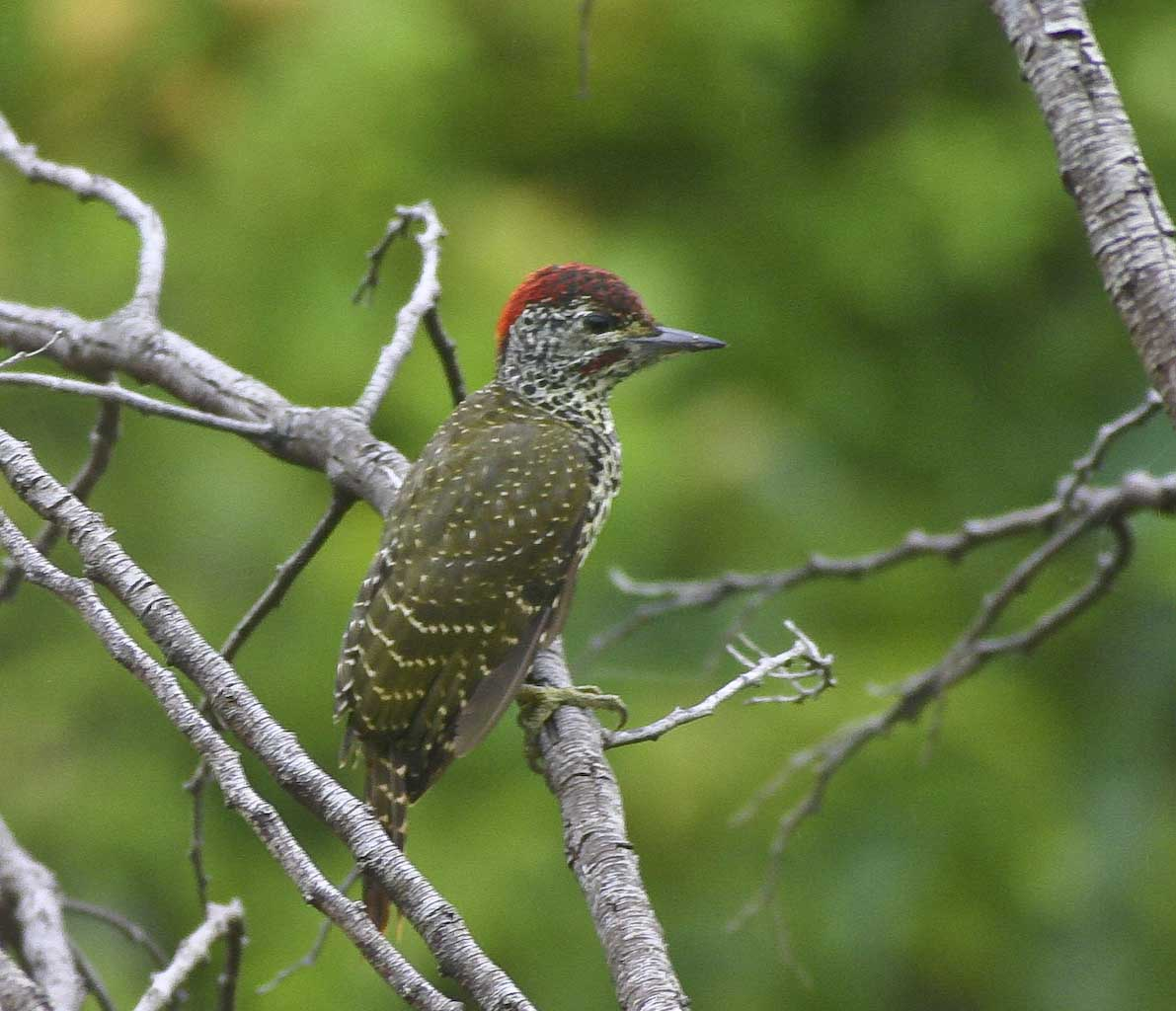
Knysna woodpecker

The reserve has well over 350 documented plant species, and over 100 bird species have been sighted. The Knysna turaco can be sighted most days, and the near threatened Knysna woodpecker has been sighted on occasion.

The reserve has been host to many special events, notably the 2018 Eden Festival of Action tree planting campaign created by the social enterprise Greenpop.
