= Knysna Fort =

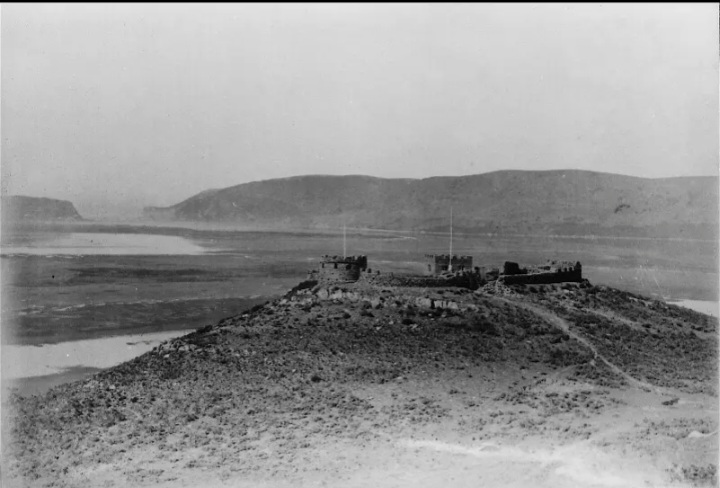
- The fort in 1901.
- Alternative names: Thomson's Folly; The Old Fort

General information
- Status: Destroyed
- Location: Knysna, South Africa
- Coordinates: 34°01′09″S 23°02′29″E
- Year built: 1901

The Old Fort, also known as the Knysna Fort or Thomson's Folly, is a fort in Knysna, Western Cape, South Africa. The fort was built during the Second Boer War by Major William A. Thomson.

The fort is the southernmost fortifications built during the Second Boer War.

== History ==
Major William A. Thomson ordered the construction of the fort after a Boer commando attacked Willowmore. The fort was built on a hill named Verdompskop, in Knysna.

A group of men were reportedly approaching the Knysna bridge on February 27, prompting the Town Guard to be called into action in less than thirty minutes. Luckily, a group of mule drivers from Pacaltsdorp, close to George, turned up. Additionally, a curfew was implemented, requiring inhabitants to stay indoors by 10 p.m. and turn out the lights one hour later.

In addition, the Standard Bank's assets and books were transported by water to Mossel Bay for safekeeping, and a number of dubious individuals—including a Dutch Reformed Church minister and others with Dutch names—were detained on false pretences.

The Knysna Town Guard was formally dissolved in 1902 following the end of the war.
