= Pink Loerie Mardi Gras and Arts Festival =

Annual LGBTQ event in Knysna, South Africa

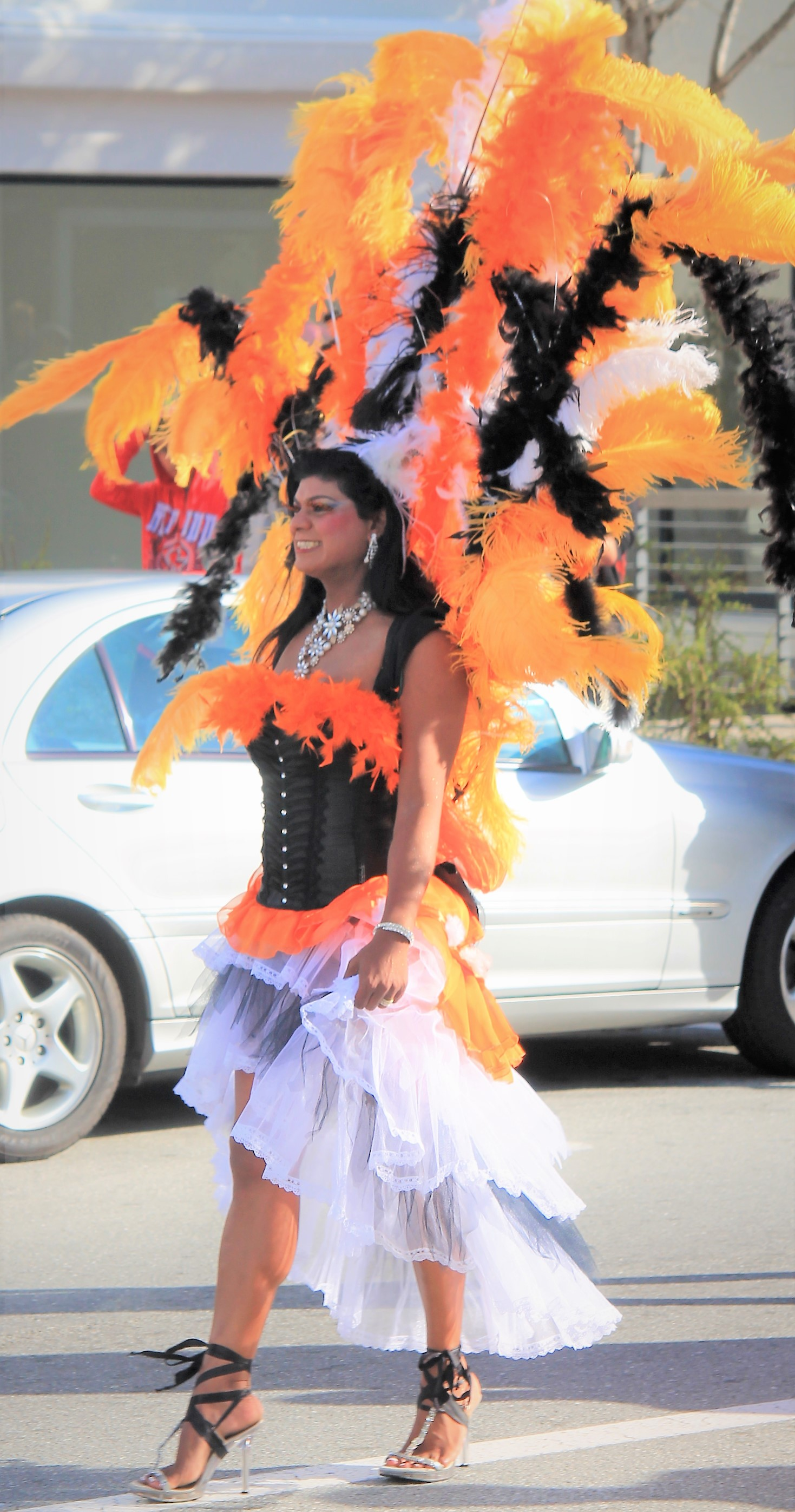
- 2014 Pink Loerie festival attendee
- Status: Active
- Genre: Festival/carnival with LGBTQ Pride parade
- Date: April/May
- Frequency: Annually
- Venue: various
- Locations: Knysna township, Western Cape province,
- Country: South Africa
- Years active: 25
- Most recent: 2018
- Attendance: 25,000-30,000
- Website: www.pinkloerie.co.za

The Pink Loerie Mardi Gras and Arts Festival is an annual LGBTQ Pride carnival event and parade held in Knysna, a coastal township in the Western Cape province of South Africa. Events include their version of the Wigstock drag queen festival, a bear fest, athletic events, and an art festival. It is one of the country's largest LGBTQ events. Since its start in 2000 it has grown to be a significant event for the town culminating in the grand finale of Pink Loerie, Knysna Pride parade and its 1000-person after-party held on the final weekend with floats, performers, and DJs. The Knysna loerie is a green bird but the color pink has a long association with LGBTQ culture.

Pink Loerie has traditionally been held in late April/ early May but in 2018 was moved to late May. 2020's festivities were cancelled due to the COVID-19 pandemic. It was announced that the Mr Gay World, and Mr Gay All Stars events will be held in conjunction with the 2021 Pink Loerie, with events in both Knysna and Port Elizabeth.

== Background ==
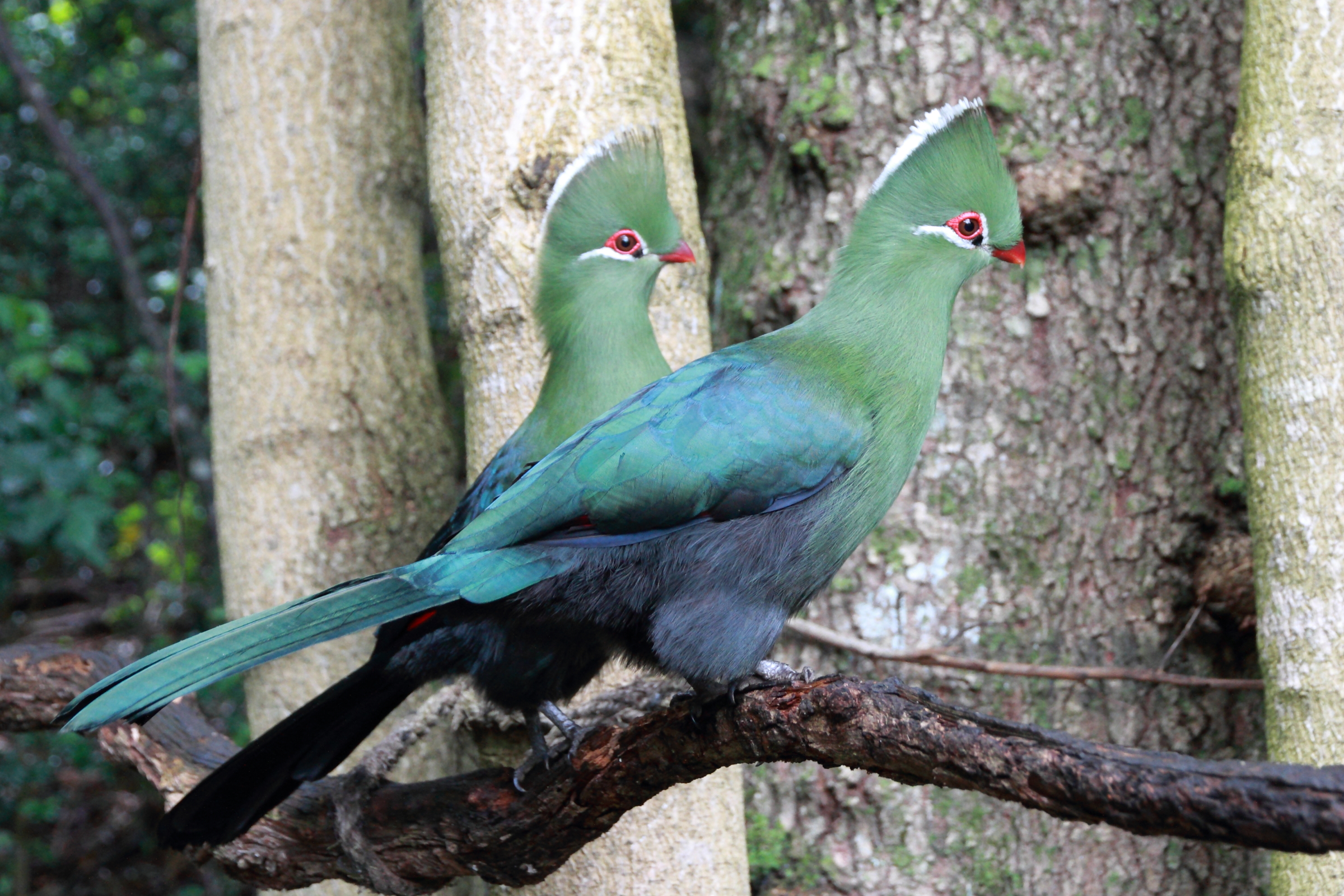
A pair of Knysna turacos or loeries for which the event is named.

According to Sowetan Live Magazine, the Knysna township is "a destination of expansive lagoons and indigenous forests surrounded by the Outeniqua Mountain range in the heart of the popular Garden Route". The local economy is geared towards tourism, including ecotourism, and the area's main local specialty oysters. Pink Loerie was started by local businessmen to entice tourists to the town during the traditionally slow month of May to reinvigorate the economy.

South Africa has "arguably the most liberal constitution for LGBTQI people" but still has to overcome homophobia and the reticence of LGBTQ people to visit. According to Pink Loerie and other groups homophobia and anti-LGBTQ attitudes were introduced to the African continent through colonialism. Same-sex relationships were quite common in Africa prior to colonialism. The Human Rights Watch (HRW) says that anti-gay stigmas often come from colonial-era laws in Africa (1870s-1900). LGBTQ tourism is estimated to be worth over $200 billion a year as of 2019.

The Knysna loerie is a green bird but the color pink has a long association with LGBTQ culture.

== History ==
The Pink Loerie Mardi Gras and Arts Festival is an annual LGBTQ Pride carnival event and parade held in Knysna, a coastal township in the Western Cape province of South Africa. Since its start in 2000 it has grown to be a significant event for the town culminating in the Knysna Pride parade or Madrid Gras.

Pink Loerie was first celebrated in May 2001, and was "groundbreaking" in the country for the way organisers worked "with the town of Knysna to put on the annual LGBTQ arts and culture festival". During early years organisers envisioned an event that would emulate Pride events celebrating diversity, the next evolution was to host a parade akin to that of the famous Sydney Mardi Gras.

Juan Lerm-Hoffman, one of the co-founders who also co-founded Mr Gay South Africa, wrote: "Pink Loerie Mardi Gras was born to benefit the town of Knysna, to create a platform for the entire LGBTI community to celebrate their culture and all the diversities within and to raise money for various charities and last but not least to use the Mardi Gras as a ‘tool’ to educate the masses on the gay community and gay culture, on the difficulties within this culture and to promote tolerance and understanding." Lerm-Hoffman, who grew up in the Eastern Cape province, ran Pink Loerie until new organizers took over in 2009.

In 2003 Pink Loerie estimated 3,000 visitors. In 2005, an estimated 10,000 people watched the parade, and 3,000 to 4,000 visitors spent the weekend in the township. In 2007 attendance was estimated at 8,000 to 10,000 people. Pink Loerie organizes fundraising like a VIP dinner, and silent auction, for charities like old-age homes, animal welfare and others raising thousands of Rands. The grand finale of Pink Loerie is Knysna Pride parade and its 1000-person after-party held on the final weekend with floats, performers, and DJs.

International attention focused on Knysna when Mr Gay World 2015, and Mr Gay World 2018 were both held as part of Pink Loerie. Mr Gay World and Pink Loerie will again coincide in the township in 2021. In 2016 Africa's first mass same-sex wedding took place when sixteen couples wed at Pink Loerie. Events include their version of the Wigstock drag queen festival, a bear fest, athletic events, and an art festival.

During the 2017 Knysna Fires—where seven people were killed and over 1000 homes were burned down—Pink Loerie and the Pink Loerie Foundation raised funds and procured relief items for families in distress. The 2018 Pink Loerie was a benefit for the recovery effort. The Pink Loerie Foundation received the Community Outreach Award during the annual 92.2 FM Eastwave Radio Nelson Mandela International Day Community Leadership Awards for their contribution and work during the 2017 Knysna Fires in the Greater Knysna area. The 2018 theme was Sequins and Mascara.

Pink Loerie has traditionally been held in late April/early May but in 2018 was moved to late May. 2019's event was postponed due to a shortage of pre-event sponsors. It was restructured in hopes future events would grow even larger. 2020's festivities were cancelled due to the COVID-19 pandemic. It was announced that the Mr Gay World, and Mr Gay All Stars events will be held in conjunction with the 2021 Pink Loerie, with events in both Knysna and Port Elizabeth.

It is one of the country's largest LGBTQ events; in 2016 they had 25,000-30,000 people. As of May 2020, John-Louis O’Neil is the Pink Loerie organizer.

Images from the 2014 Pink Loerie festival

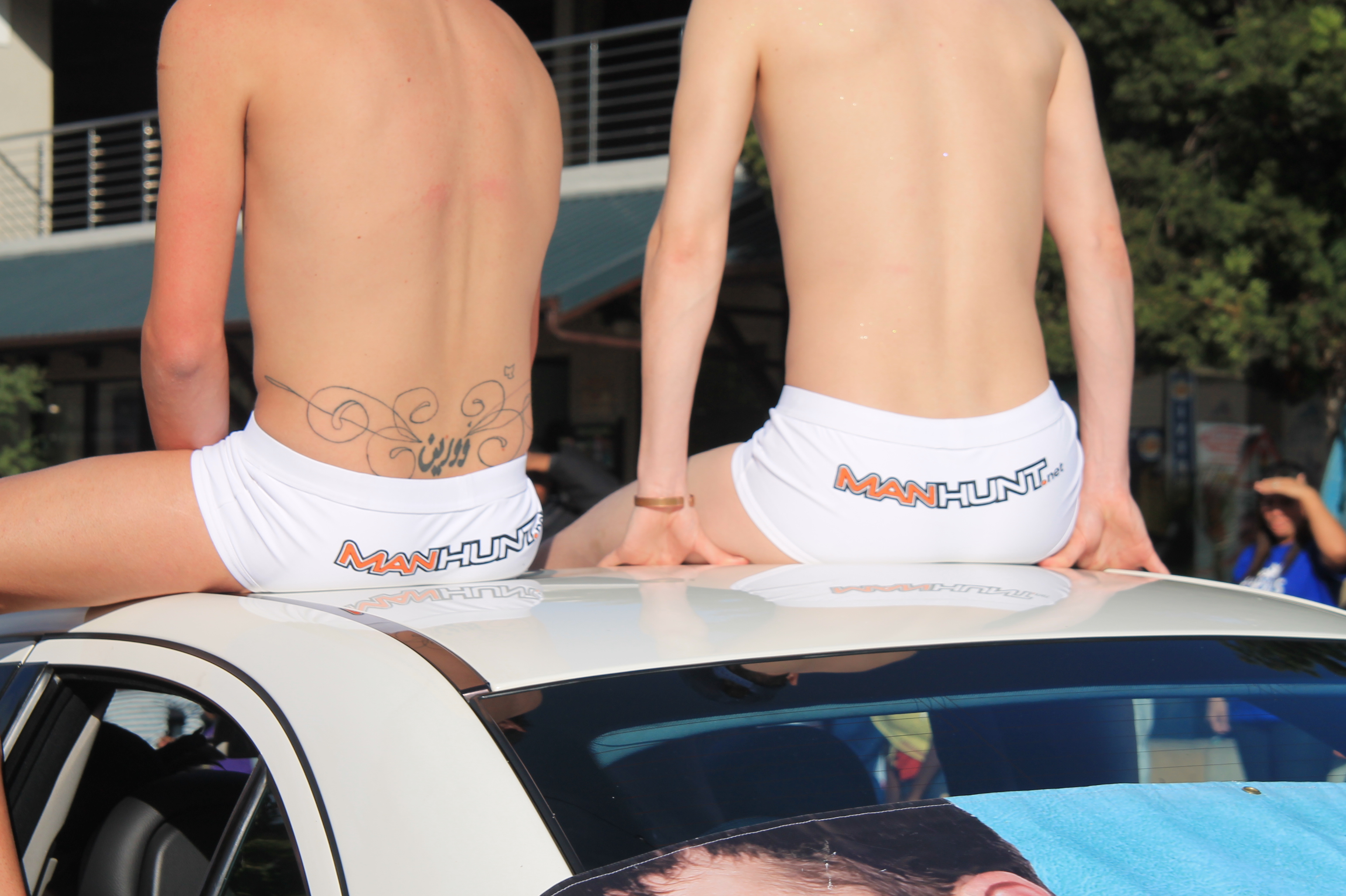

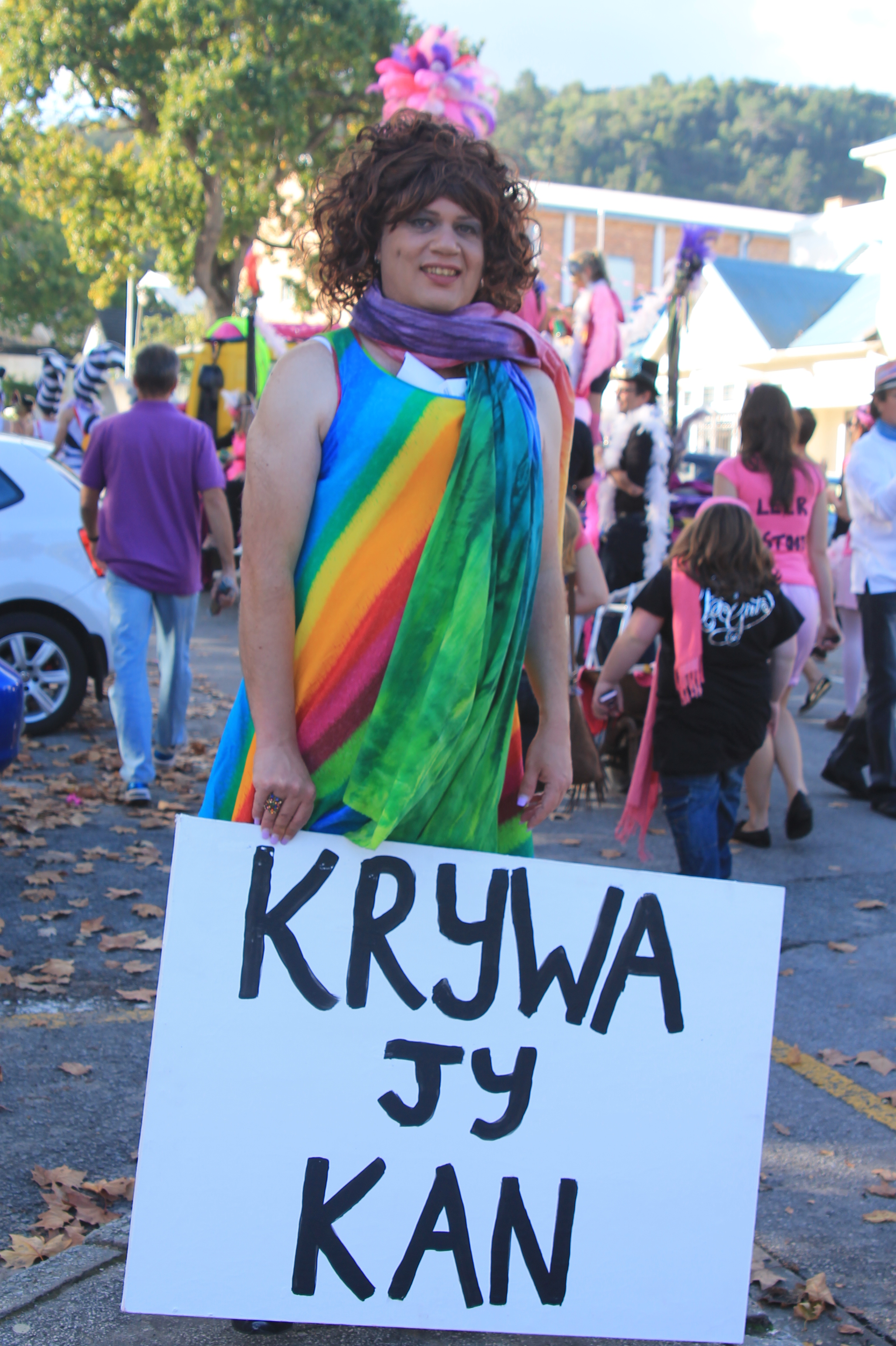

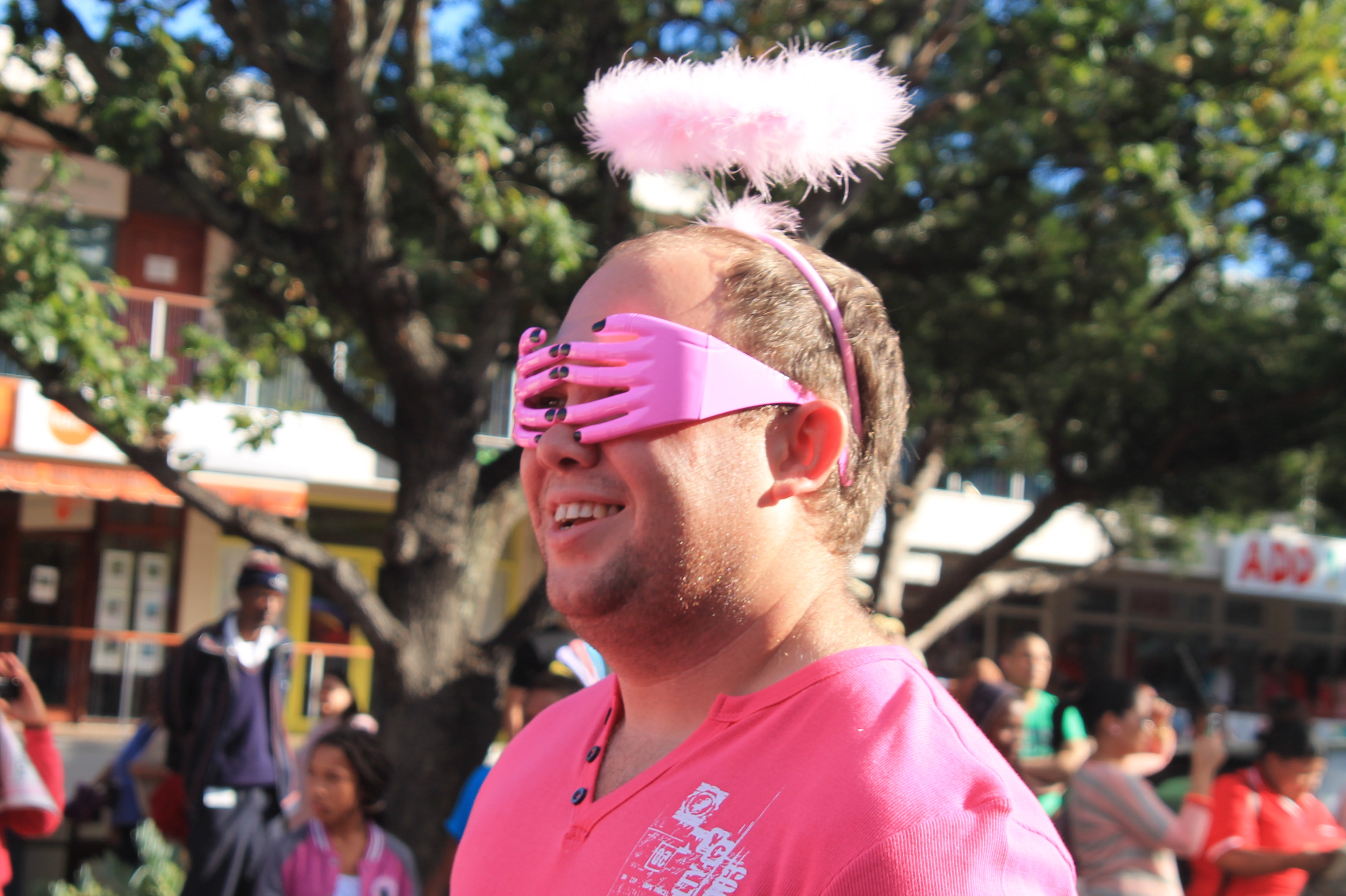

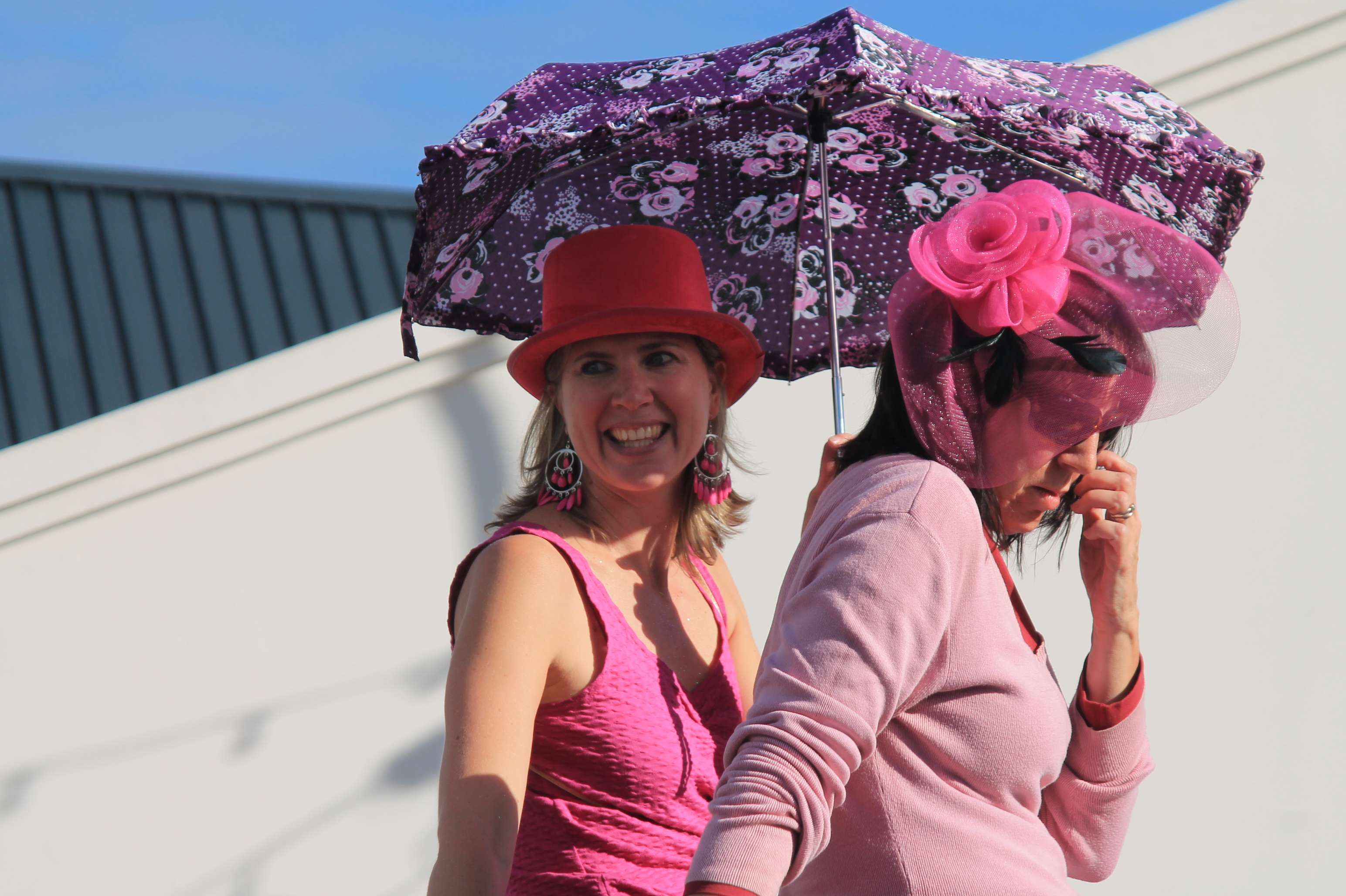

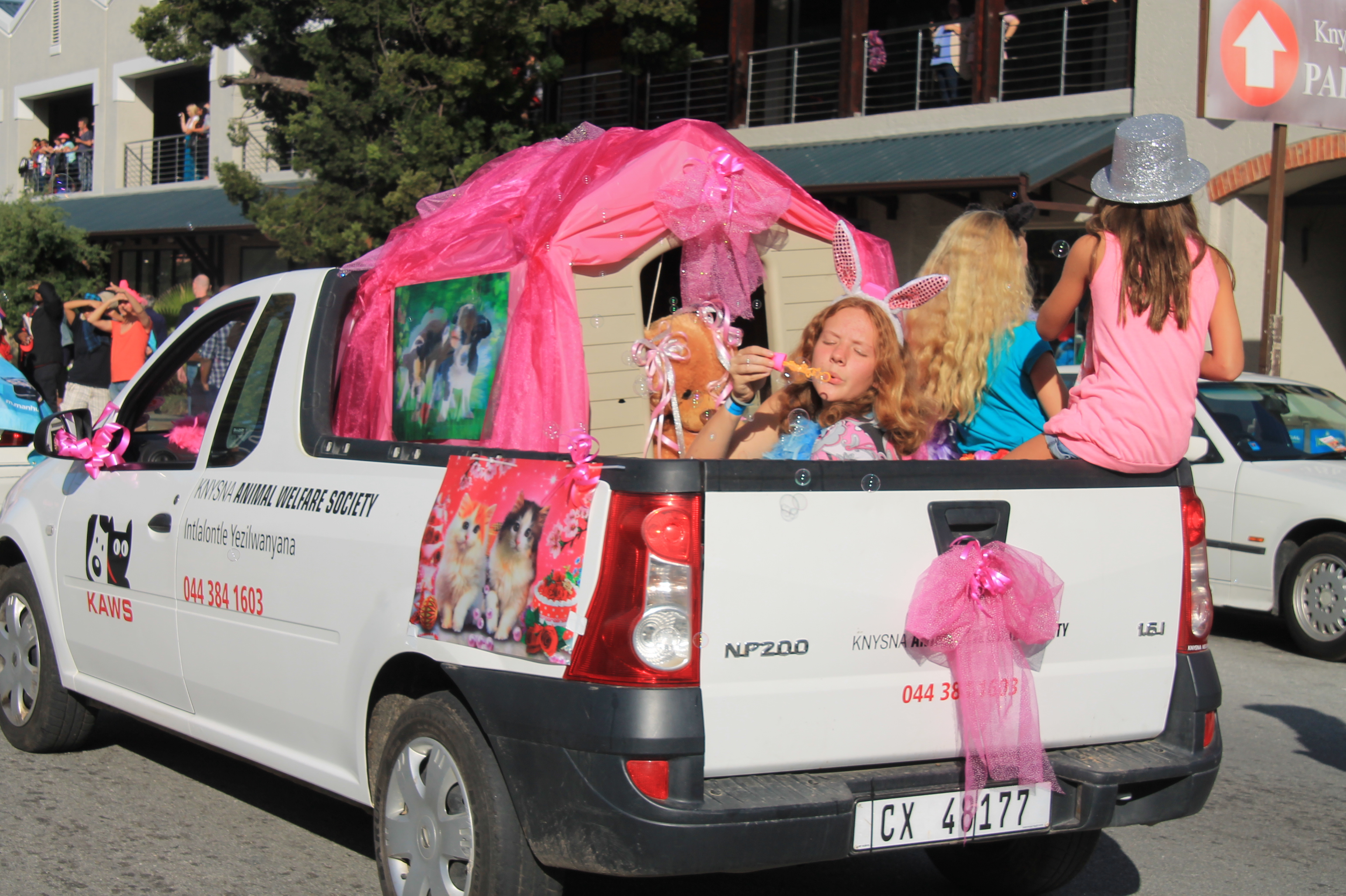

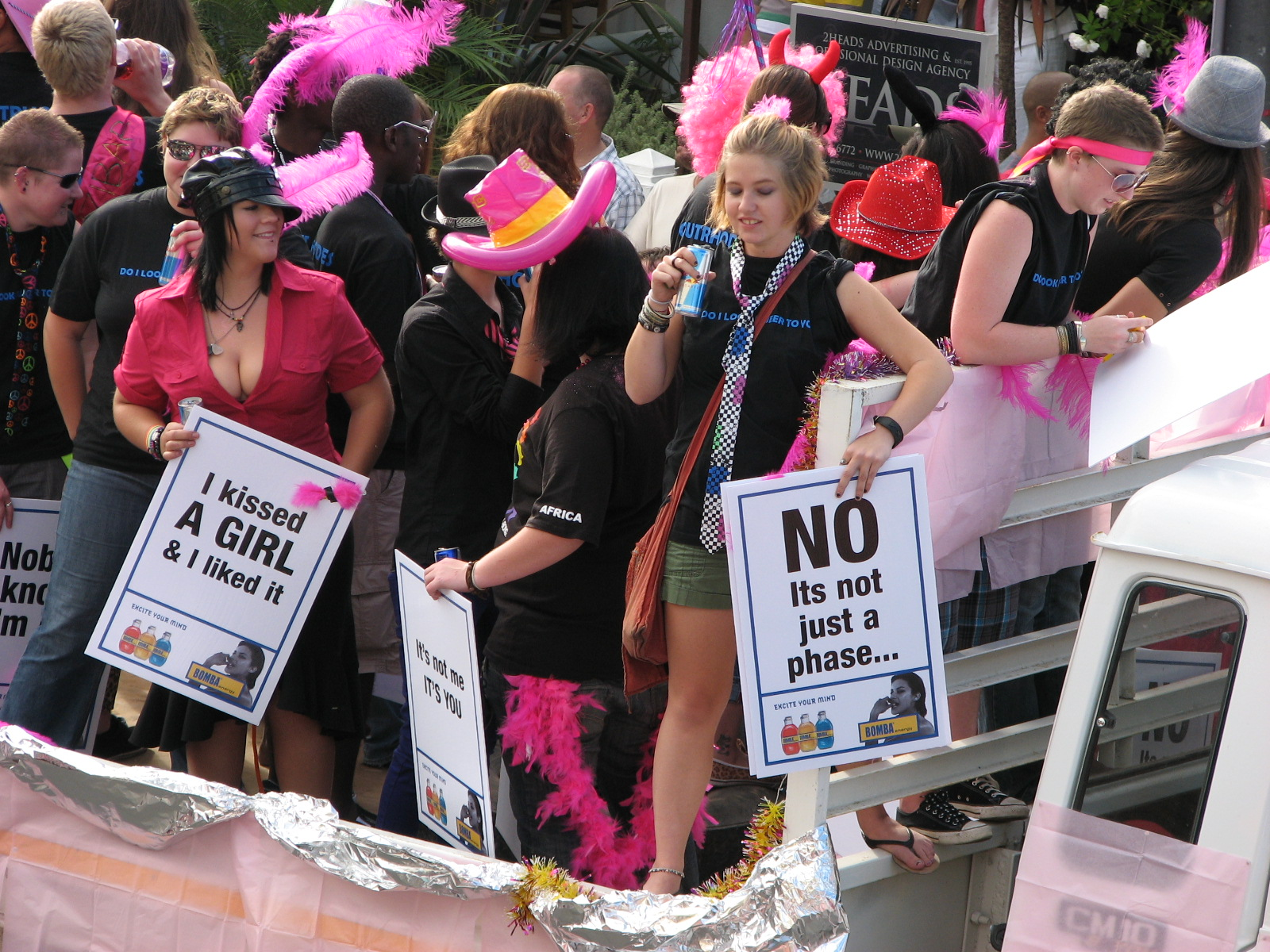

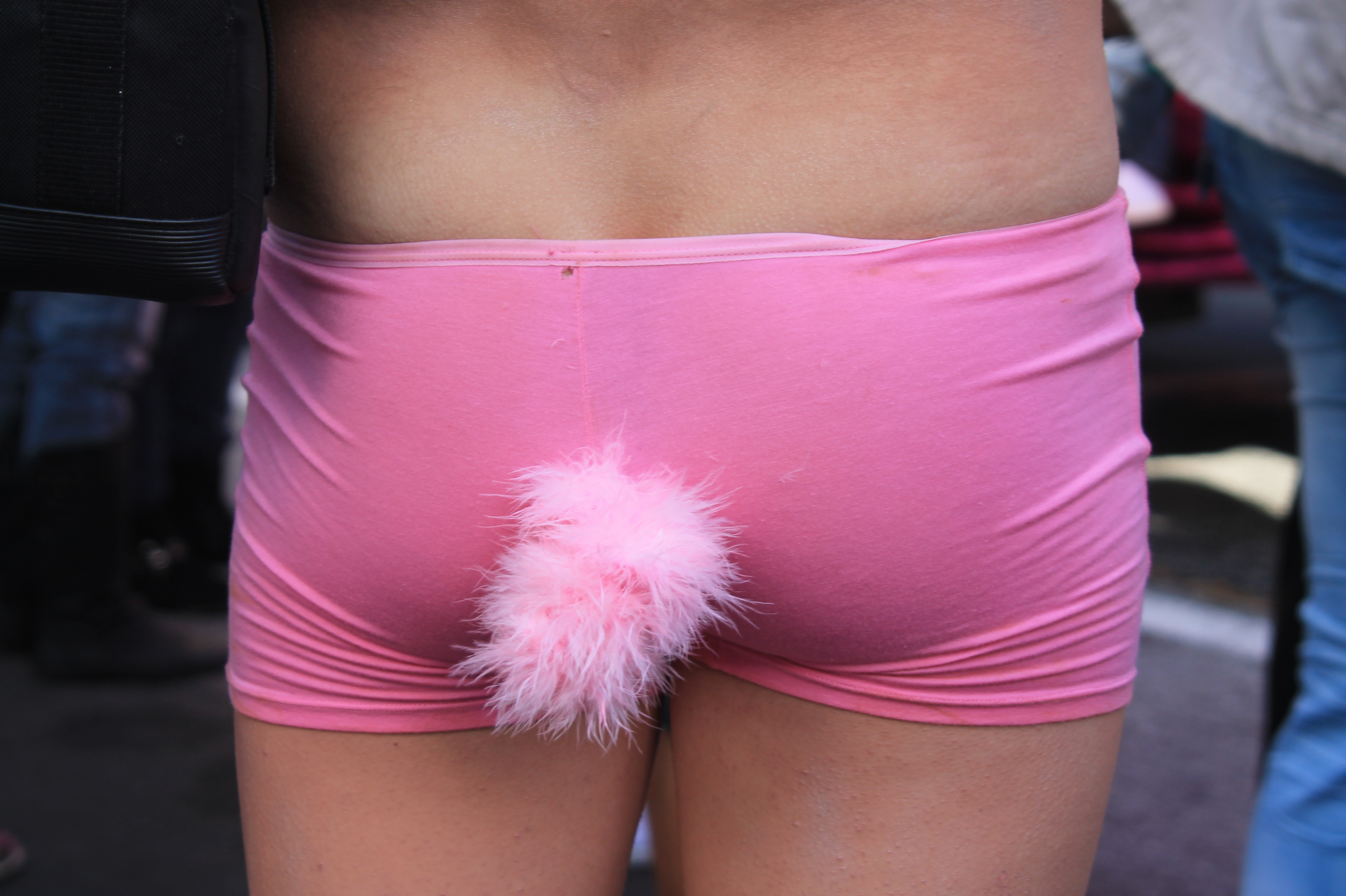

== Pink Loerie Magazine ==
To secure funds in partnerships sponsors will often pay for ads in what has become Pink Loerie Magazine (PLM). What started as a small one color guide booklet in 2010, evolved to a full color newspaper by 2012, and eventually to a registered glossy full color magazine. The event has traditionally raised as much sponsorships as possible including support from Knysna Tourism, and the Town Council. After expenses have been paid the remaining thousands is split between the named charities. In 2014, R22,450 (equivalent to $27,490 in 2018) was raised for three charities: R5000 to the Knysna Animal Welfare Society, R9450 to the Loeriehof old age home, and R8000 to the Knysna Mayor's Social Relief Fund.

== See also ==
- International LGBTQ+ Travel Association
