= Knysna Yacht Club =

Knysna Yacht Club, or simply the KYC, is a sailing club located in town of Knysna, on the Indian Ocean coast of South Africa.

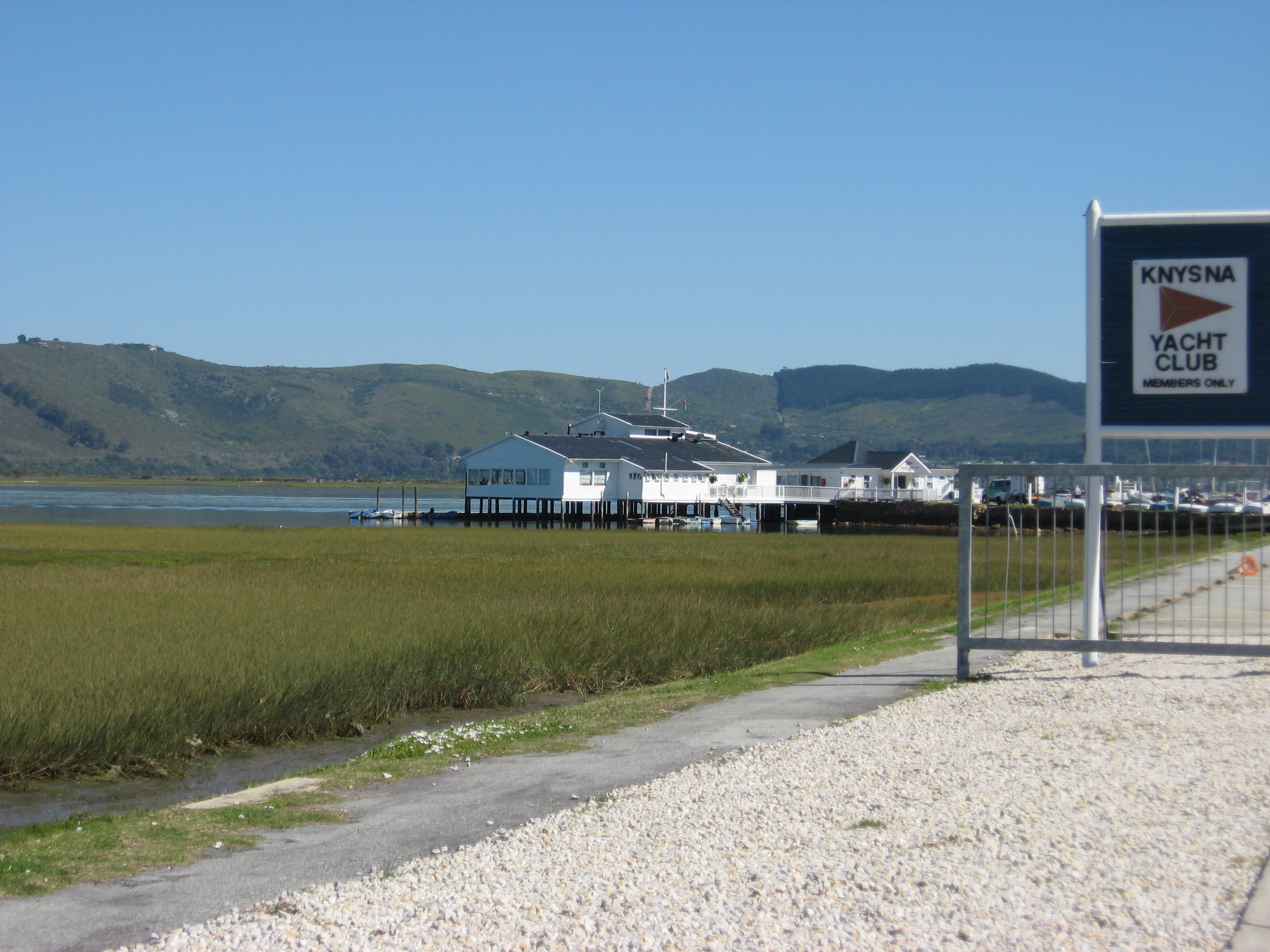
Club house in 2014

== History ==
The club was founded on 31 August 1910 by a handful of sailing enthusiasts.

== Some of the founder members ==
- Ascheton Geddes DE Smidt -First Commodore
- AV Cooke
- WP Cuthbert
- EL Dudley
- George Rex Duthie
- JC Duthie
- JJ Duthie
- WA Duthie
- J Rex Metlerkamp

The first clubhouse was completed in December 1911 and at a cost of £176.10.0d . The clubhouse was built from yellowwood.

== General ==
Sailors passing through the Heads have a safe navigable lagoon in which to moor their yachts while visiting Knysna and the surrounding region.

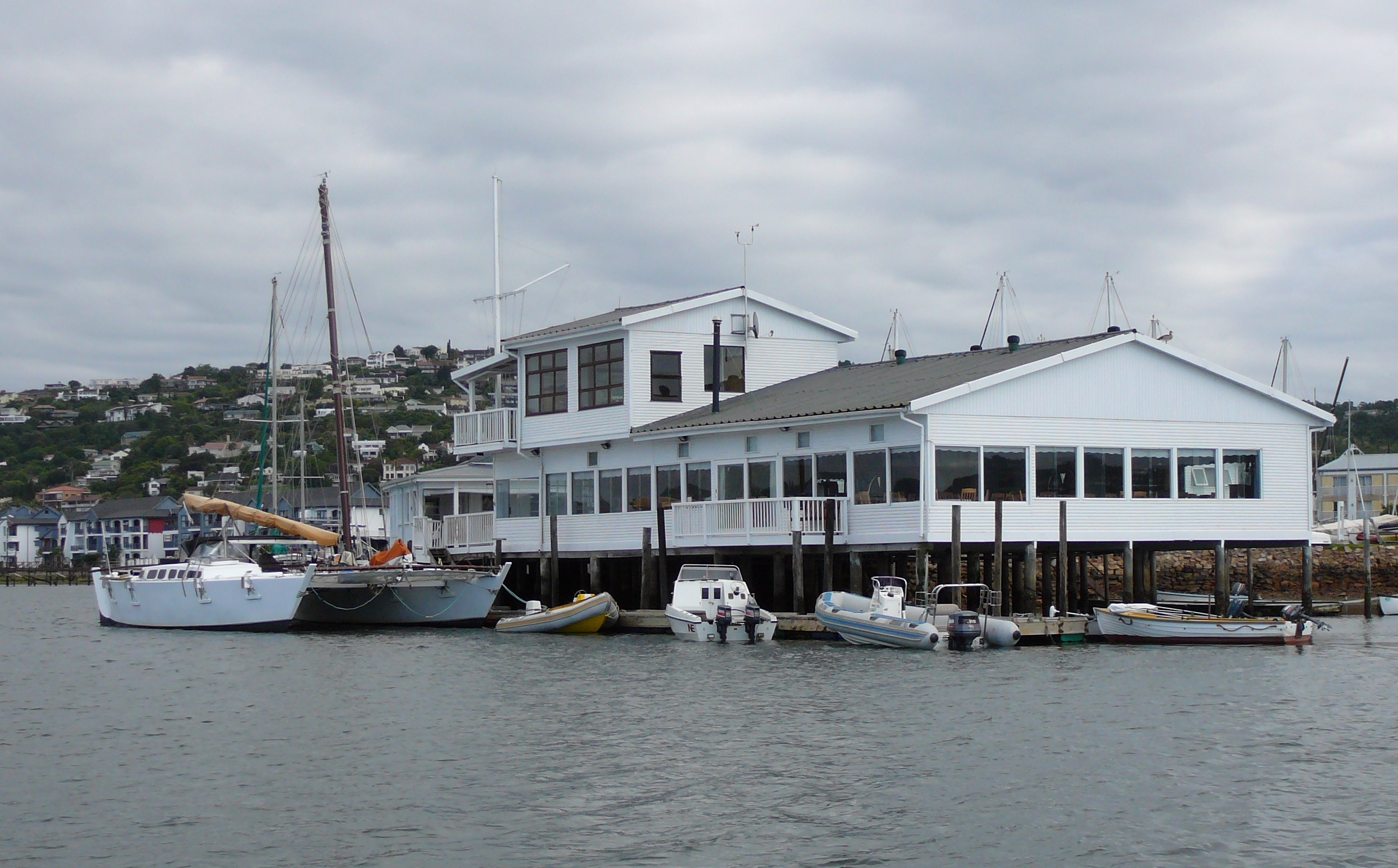
Boats moored at the Yacht Club
