= Knysna =

Town in Western Cape, South Africa

- Town
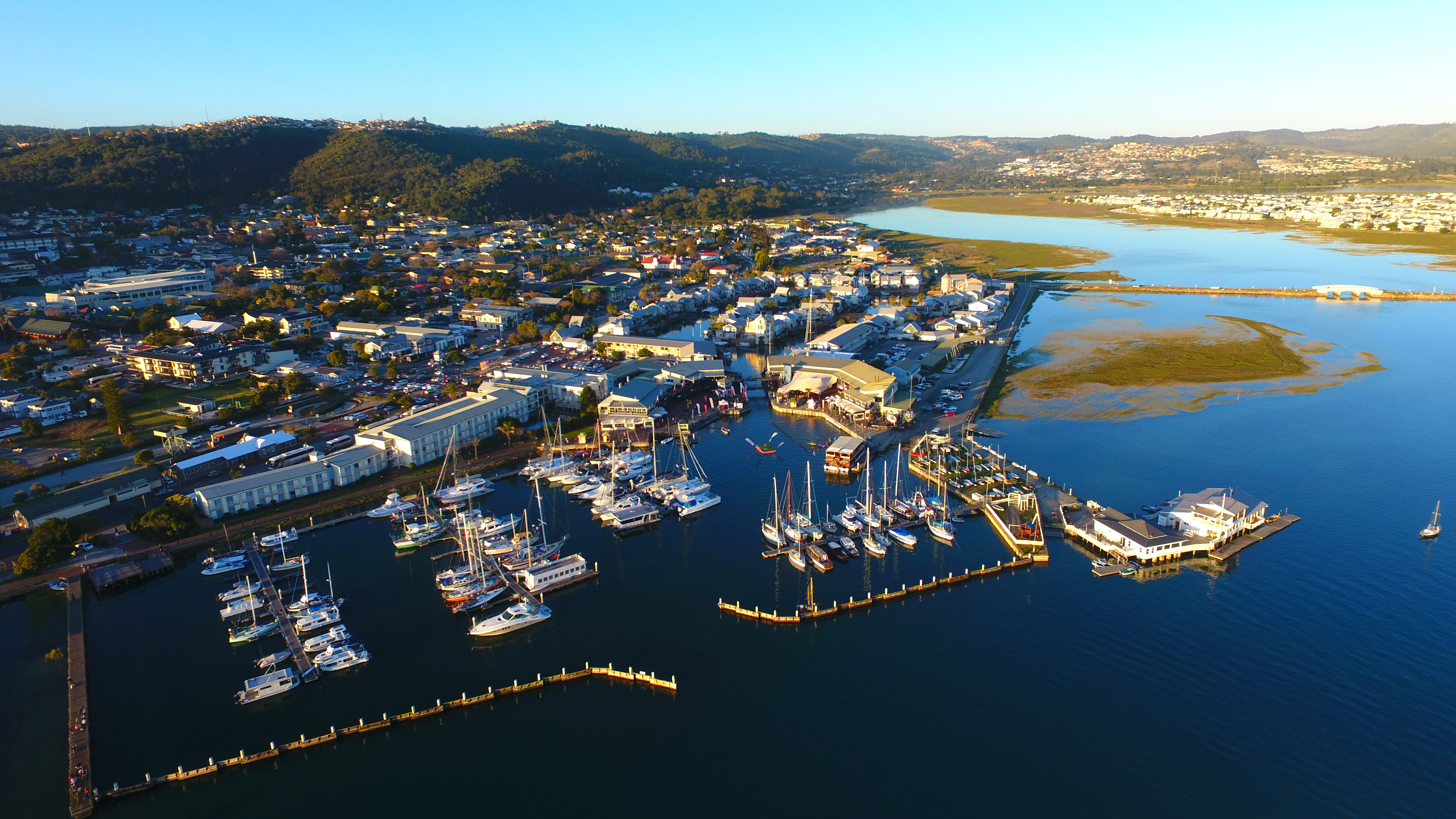
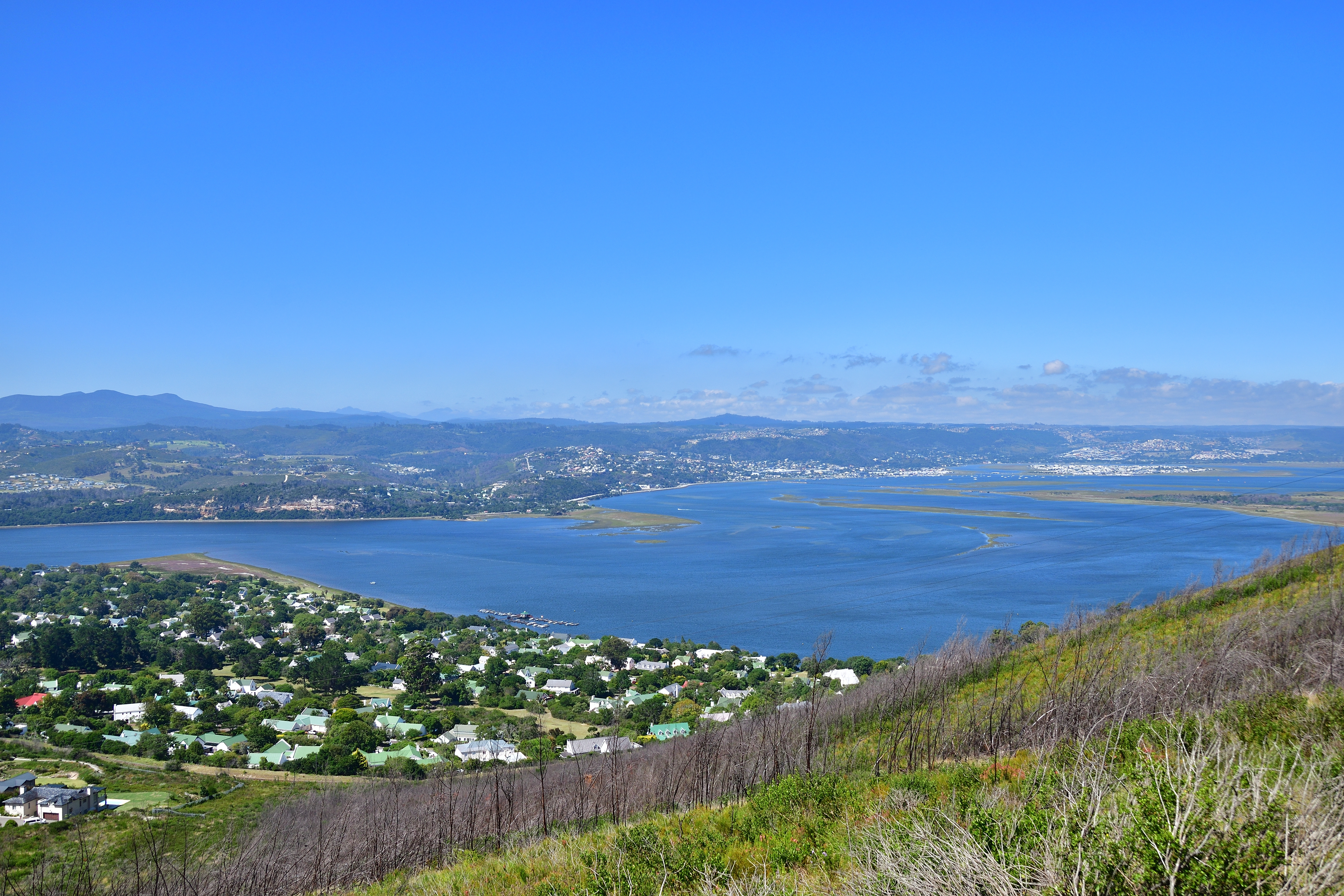
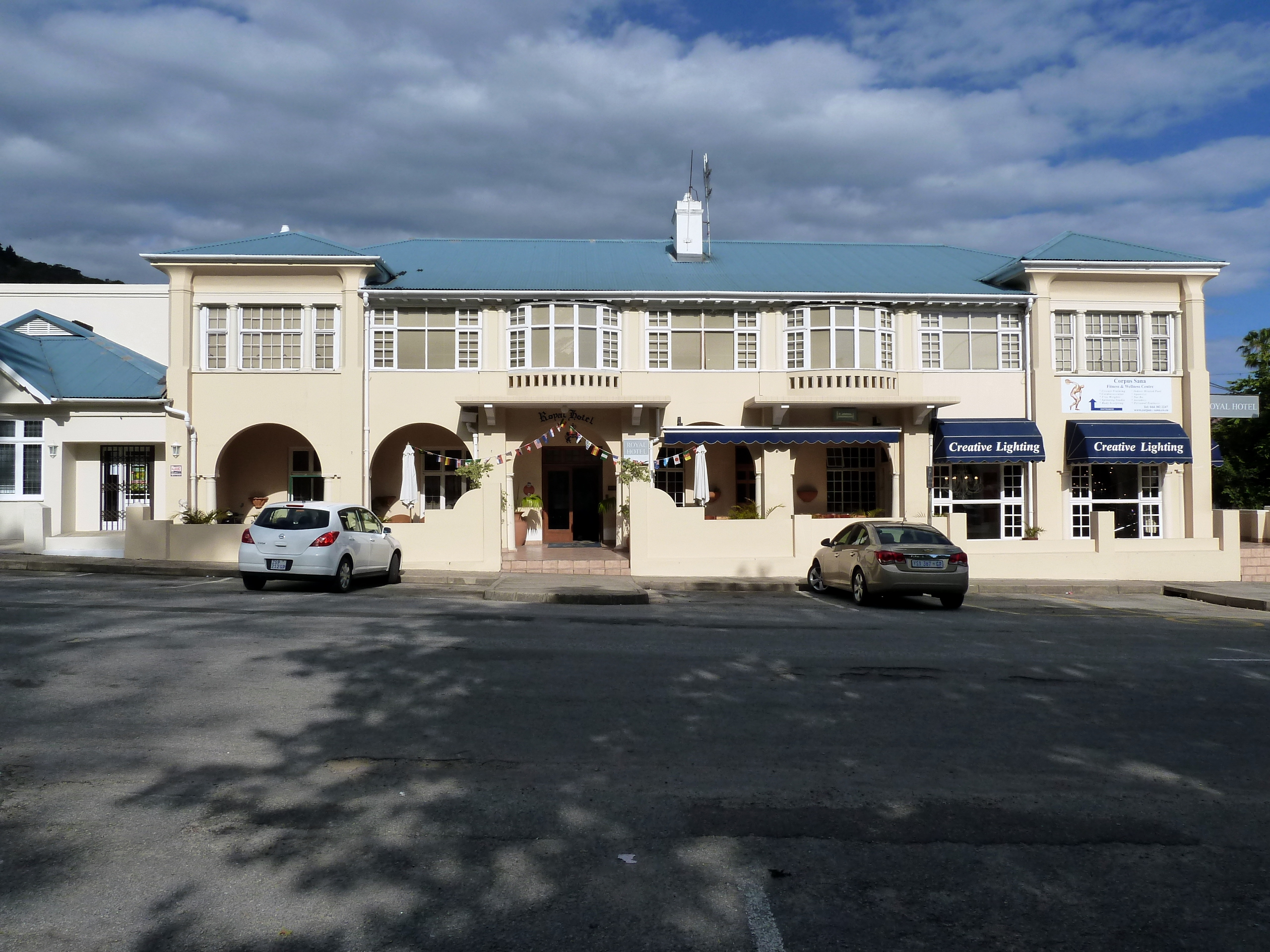
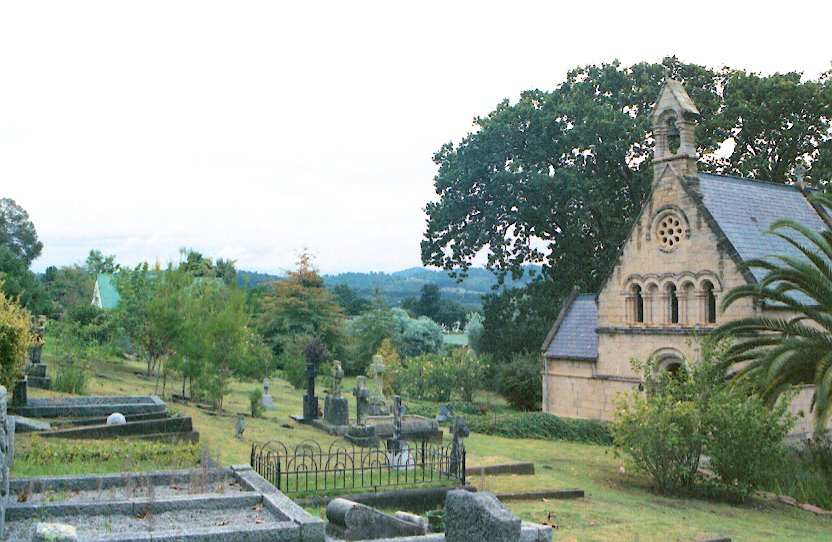
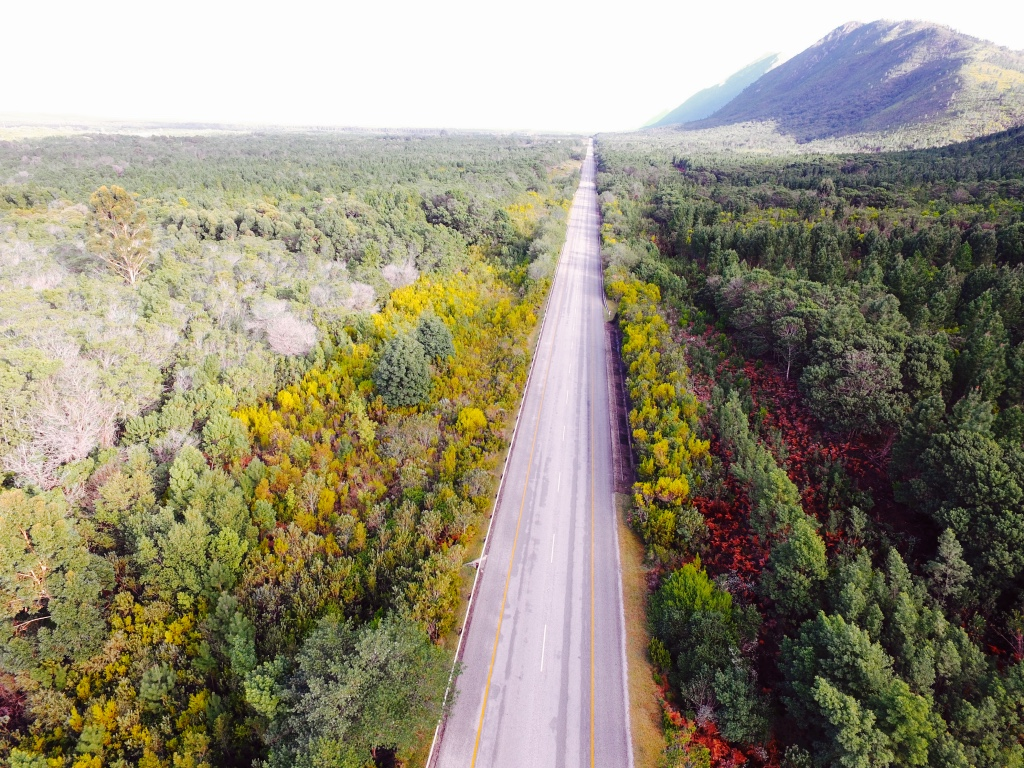
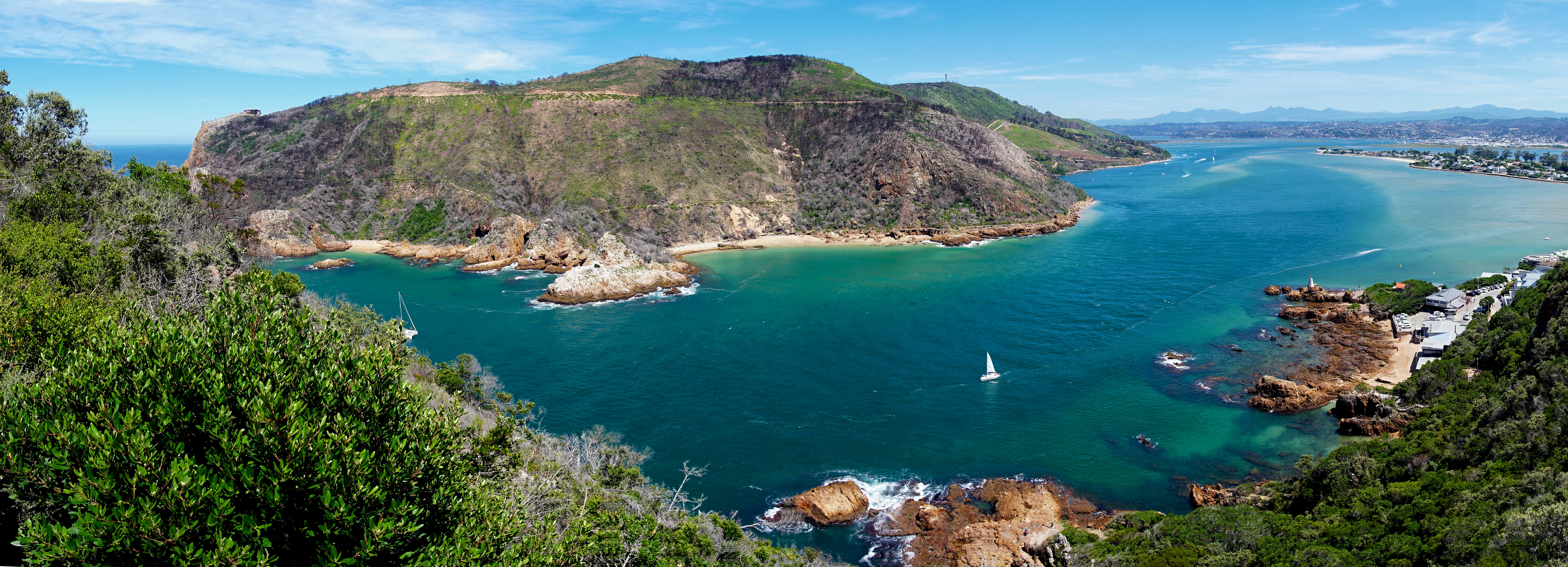
- From top: Aerial view of Knysna and its waterfront area, with the lagoon visible in the background to the right. Left: Knysna viewed from the West. Right: The Royal Hotel. Left: Holy Trinity Church. Right: Tsitsikamma Forests. Bottom: Knysna Heads

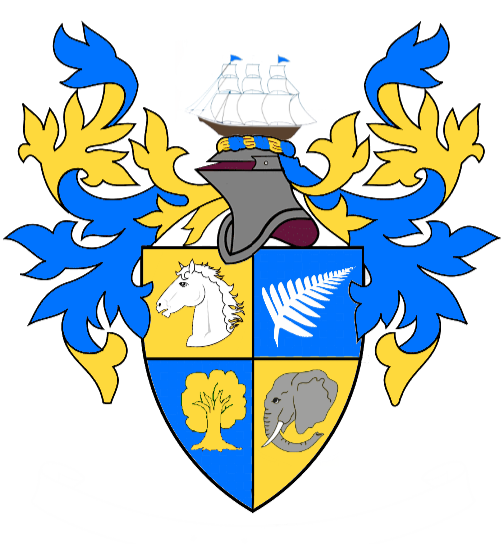
- Coat of arms
- Motto(s): Concilio et Prudentia (Latin:With Co-operation and Prudence)
- Location within Western Cape Location within South Africa Location within Africa
- Coordinates: 34°02′08″S 23°02′56″E
- Country: South Africa
- Province: Western Cape
- District: Garden Route
- Municipality: Knysna
- Established: 1871

Government
  - Councillor: Peter Bester (Ward 10) (DA)

Area
  - Total: 108.77 km^{2} (42.00 sq mi)

Population (2019)
  - Total: 76,150
  - Density: 700.1/km^{2} (1,813/sq mi)

Racial makeup (2011)
  - Black African: 42.8%
  - Coloured: 36.8%
  - Indian/Asian: 0.5%
  - White: 18.3%
  - Other: 1.6%

First languages (2011)
  - Afrikaans: 45.6%
  - Xhosa: 34.4%
  - English: 14.7%
  - Other: 5.3%
- Time zone: UTC+2 (SAST)
- Postal code (street): 6570
- PO box: 6570
- Area code: 044
- Website: http://www.knysna.gov.za/

Knysna (/ˈnaɪznə/; Afrikaans pronunciation: [ˈnəisna]) is a coastal town with 76,150 inhabitants (as of 2019) in the Western Cape province of South Africa. It is one of the destinations in the lush Garden Route region.

Knysna is situated 60 kilometres east of the city of George, and 33 kilometres west of Plettenberg Bay, on the N2 freeway.

== Etymology ==
The explanation that exists for the origins of the name "Knysna" suggest that it comes from "|heisna", purportedly from a Eastern Cape Khoe word for "tree" plus a locative suffix that together might have meant "place of timber", "place of tree-ferns".

== History ==
=== Early history ===
Forty fossilised hominid footprints, dating to about 90,000 years ago, along with various other archaeological discoveries suggest that humans have lived in Knysna for well over 300,000 years. The first of these were various San Hunter-gatherer peoples who inhabited most of Southern Africa in the Paleolithic. The San were gradually displaced and absorbed by southward migrating Khoekhoe peoples.

=== Houtunqua (Outeniqua) Khoe ===
The indigenous inhabitants of the Knysna area are a southern Khoekhoe people called the Houtunqua or Outeniqua. Their name means "The People Who Bear Honey". From the Khoekhoegowab words /hao, 'honey', tun'(teni), 'to carry (verb)', and khoe rendered as qua, meaning people.

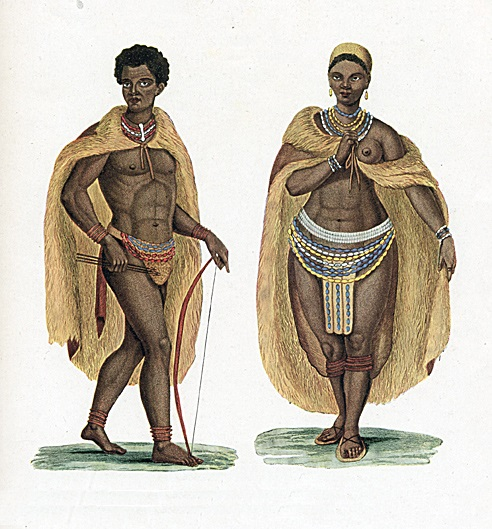
19th-century depiction of Khoekhoe people.

Little is known about Houtunqua society prior to European contact. What little historical sources exist are not elaborate. It is suspected that at the height of the Houtunqua's society, their territory stretched from the mouth of the Krom River in the east, along the Outeniqua Mountains which bear their name, to the mouth of the Grootbrak River in the west.

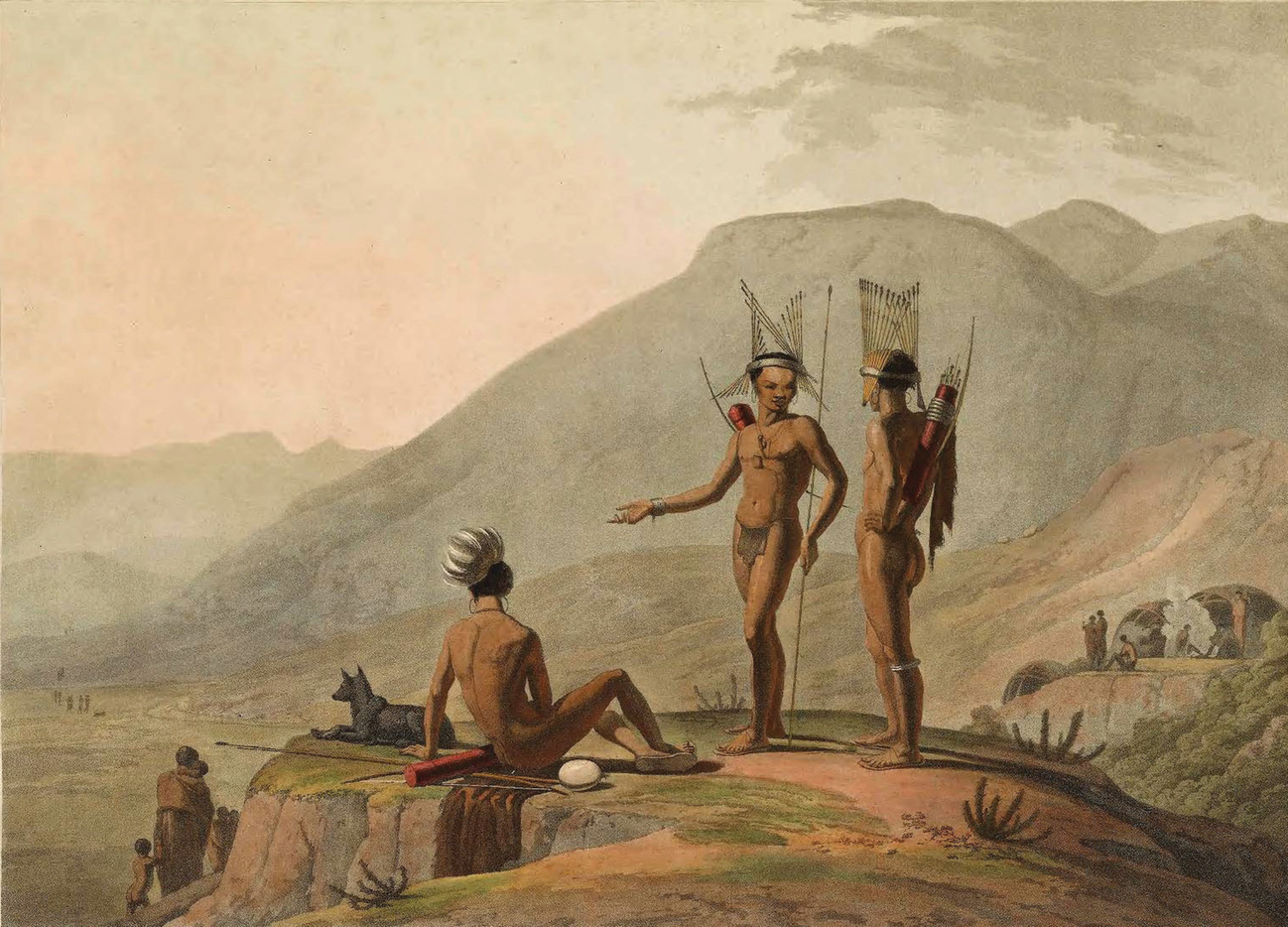
Khoekhoe hunters.

The Houtunqua seem to have remained autonomous from the Inqua (Hamcumqua) expansion in the north with smaller Khoekhoe tribes such as the Gamtobaqua coming into the fold of the Houtunqua to seek protection from the ever expanding Inqua to the north east. The Houtunqua were connected to trades routes with the Attaqua and Hessequa to the west.

Archaeological evidence suggests that the Houtunqua kept livestock and practised Nomadic Pastoralism but made extensive use of the resources in mountain forests. Excavations in the region have unearthed many caves showing signs of pre-colonial occupation.The discovery of shell middens at Knoetzie beach confirms that like other Khoekhoe peoples, the Houtuniqua made use of ocean resources.

Oral tradition among the Houtunqua tells how the Houtunqua held specific superstitions about Europeans and believed them to be "baleful spirits". Thus the Houtunqua went out of their way to avoid contact with Europeans. Where other Khoekhoe tribes established formal relations and trade with Europeans, the Houtunqua receded deeper and deeper into the mountain forests. As a result, the Houtunqua disappeared from the historical record for some time with some Houtunqua eventually assimilating into colonial society of the time. Chief Dikkop, who died in 1816, was the last recorded Chief of the Houtunqua.

=== European settlement ===
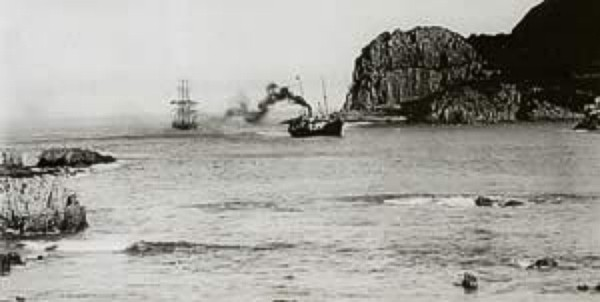
The SS Agnar tows an unknown sailing ship into Knysna Harbour in 1910.

The first Europeans arrived in the area in 1760, and the farm Melkhoutkraal (literally translating from Afrikaans as "milk wood pen") was established on the eastern shore of the Knysna Lagoon. Stephanus Terblans, the first European farmer to settle in the area, was given a loan permit to farm here in 1770.

Upon moving to Knysna George Rex, a British-born entrepreneur credited as being the founder of Knysna, acquired the loan rights to Melkhoutkraal in 1804 and later, in 1816, to the farm Welbedacht, which he renamed Eastford. He gave 32 ha (80 acres) of Eastford to the Colonial Government, on which the Royal Navy established the township of Melville. Rex's properties were sold when he died in 1839.

In April 1817, the transport brig Emu, belonging to the Cape Town Dockyard, was the first European vessel to enter the Knysna Heads. She struck a rock, now known as Emu Rock, and was holed. Her crew ran Emu ashore to prevent her sinking. In late April HMS Podargus arrived to render assistance. After surveying the area, Podargus sailed safely into the Knysna and retrieved Emu's cargo.

The next major settler in Knysna was Captain Thomas Henry Duthie, who married Caroline, George Rex's daughter, and bought a portion of the Uitzigt farm from his father-in-law which Rex had named Belvidere. The construction of a small Norman-style church was commissioned by Duthie on his property, and was consecrated in 1855. The settlement's population grew slowly, and Englishmen such as Henry Barrington and Lt. Col. John Sutherland, who established the settlement of Newhaven on a portion of purchased land, settled in the area. At the time, Knysna was a field cornetcy of Plettenberg Bay within the Magisterial Division of George. In 1858, Knysna became a separate Magisterial Division, new stores and accommodation facilities were opened, and Knysna became the new commercial centre of the region.

On their way to New Zealand, the Thesen family who were travelling from Norway fancied the little hamlet of Knysna so much that they decided to stay, bringing with them their knowledge of commerce and sailing. Soon, timber was being exported to the Cape from the vast areas of forest surrounding Knysna, and a steam sawmill and small shipyard were established. Later, these were relocated to Paarden Island, later known as Thesen's Island.

=== Millwood Gold Rush ===
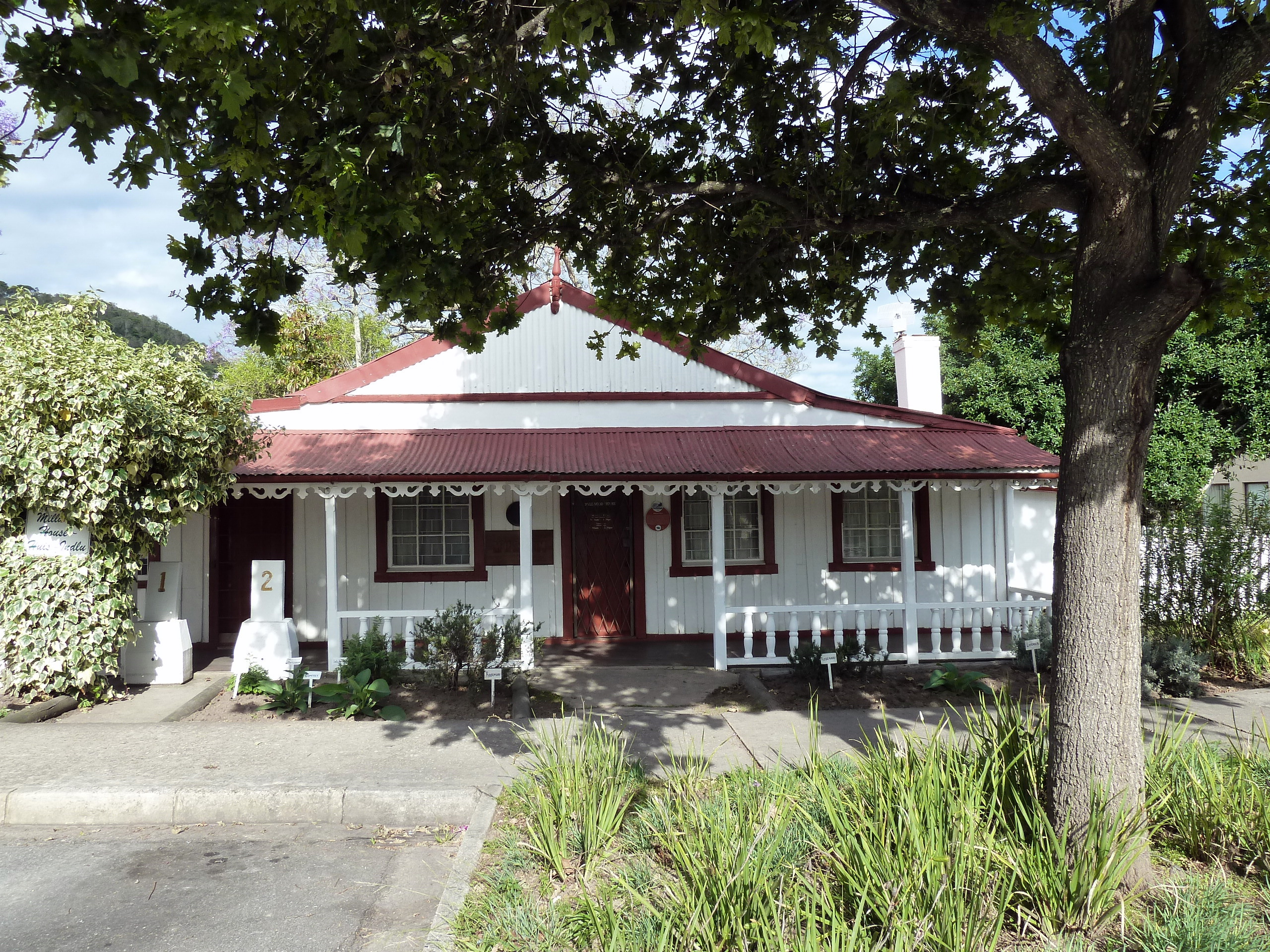
Millwood House Museum

In 1878, an important discovery was made in the area. A gold nugget was found in the Karatara River, near Ruigtevlei. Soon fortune hunters from all over the world arrived at the Millwood Forest in search of gold, and Millwood grew into a bustling town. Millwood was declared a gold field, the first in South Africa. However, soon not enough gold was being recovered to sustain a growing town, and the mining industry in the area collapsed. Some miners relocated to Knysna, bringing their little homes with them. One of the houses, known as "Millwood House", now functions as a museum.

=== Amalgamation and timber industry ===
By 1880 over 1000 people had settled in Knysna. In 1882, the settlements of Newhaven, Melville and the "wedge" of land between the two villages were amalgamated to form the municipality of "The Knysna", named after the Knysna River.

Knysna's timber industry peaked when George Parkes arrived from Britain and saw the opportunity to use the hardwoods of the Knysna Forest for export to elsewhere in the country, and even overseas. He established the Knysna Forest Company, later renamed Geo. Parkes and Sons Ltd., which is still trading to this day.

=== 2017 Knysna fire ===
On 7 June 2017, fuelled by strong winds from a severe storm - the Cape Storm of 2017- coming in from the west, a fire swept through the town and surrounding areas. Killing nine as a direct result of the fires and another two indirectly and displacing around 10,000 people from all walks of life. Initially reported as arson, the cause of the fire was later revealed to have been lightning.

== Geography ==
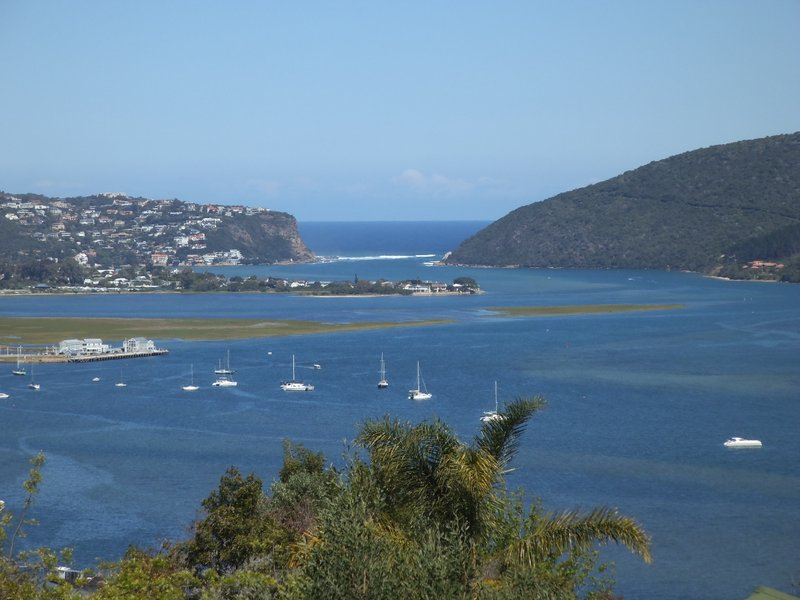
Knysna Heads

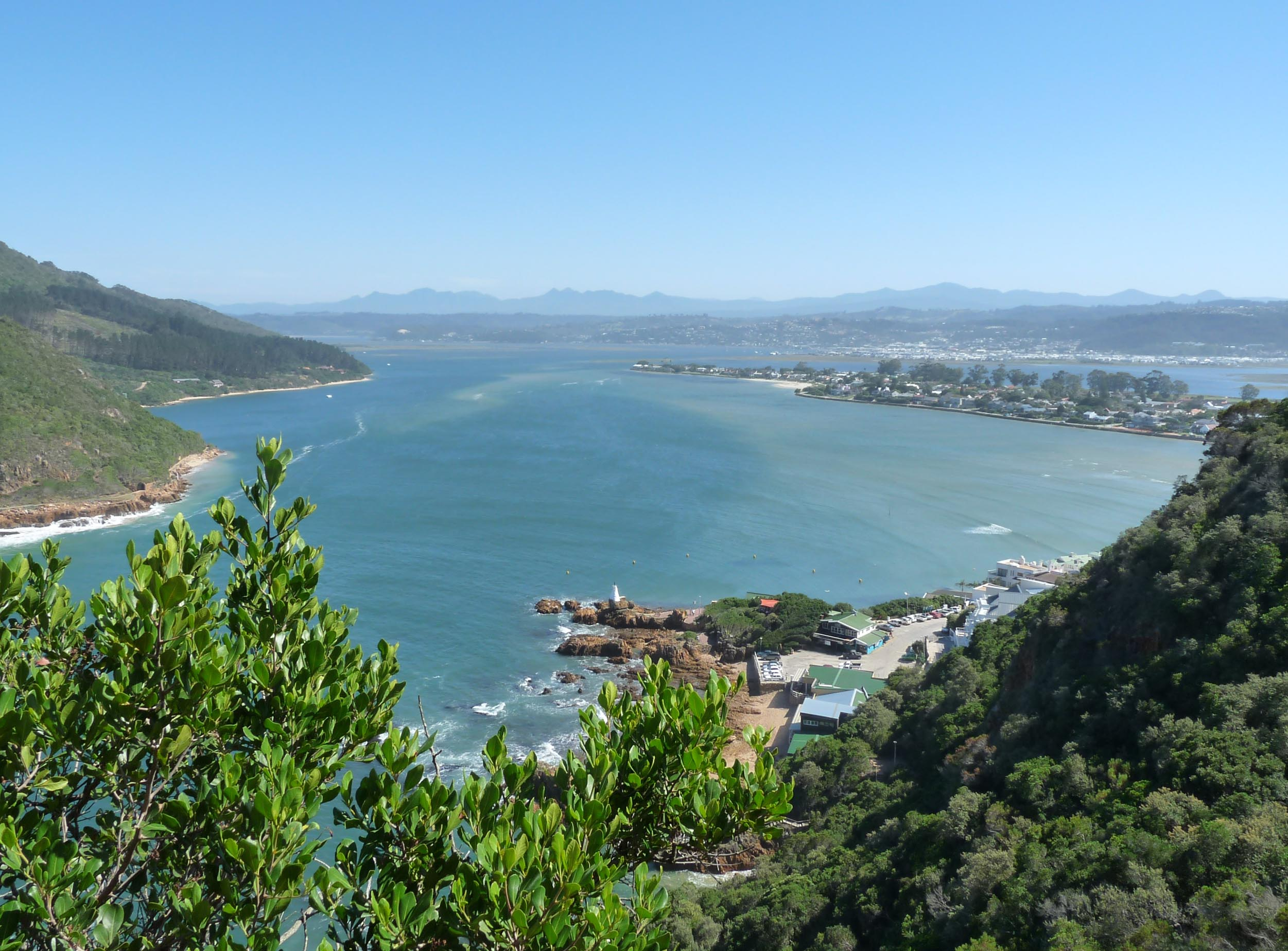
Knysna Estuary

The town is primarily built on the northern shore of a large warm-water estuary, known as the Knysna Lagoon, which is fed by the Knysna River. The estuary opens to the ocean after passing between two large headlands made up of Peninsula Formation quartzites. These are popularly known as "The Heads", and have become infamous due to the loss of boats and fishermen passing through their treacherous and unpredictable waters. The Paquita, a German vessel, sank on the eastern side of the Knysna Heads in 1903. Near them are geological formations, known locally as "The Map Stones". To the north of Knysna, Afro-Montane or temperate rainforest covers the hilly terrain for 20 km until changing to fynbos or macchia high in the Outeniqua Mountains. The eastern head is heavily developed, while the western head is partially protected by a private nature reserve, Featherbed Nature Reserve, developed and formerly owned by teacher and television presenter William Smith on land he inherited from his father, famed ichthyologist J. L. B. Smith.

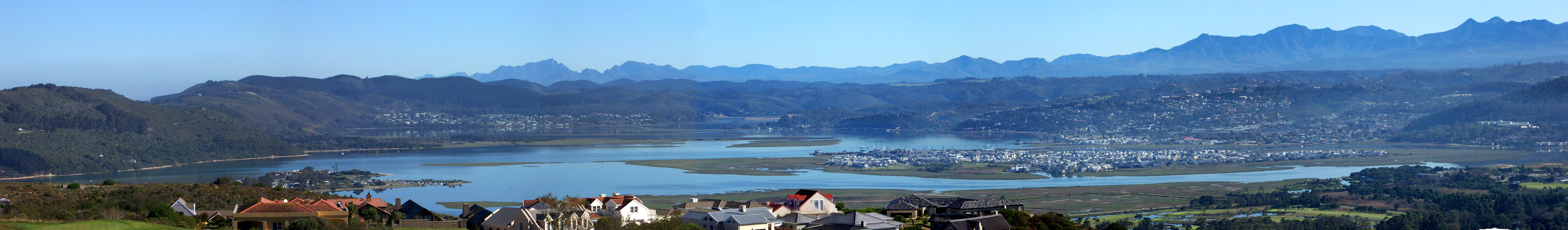
Panorama of Knysna as viewed from Pezula Estate

=== Climate ===
Knysna has a warm oceanic climate (Cfb in the Köppen climate classification). Summers are warm and are winters mild. During the summer, the average maximum temperature reaches about 25 °C (77 °F) and rarely goes above 30 °C (86 °F). The average maximum temperature during the winter months ranges in the area of 17 °C (63 °F) to 18 °C (64 °F). Knysna has one of the richest rainfall percentages in South Africa with the wettest time of year being from October to November. Knysna stays green in all seasons, and its temperate climate makes it a tourist destination all year round.

Climate data for Knysna
Month	Jan	Feb	Mar	Apr	May	Jun	Jul	Aug	Sep	Oct	Nov	Dec	Year
Mean daily maximum °C (°F)	23.4 (74.1)	23.6 (74.5)	22.7 (72.9)	21.0 (69.8)	19.6 (67.3)	17.8 (64.0)	17.3 (63.1)	17.5 (63.5)	18.1 (64.6)	19.4 (66.9)	20.4 (68.7)	22.3 (72.1)	20.3 (68.5)
Mean daily minimum °C (°F)	17.1 (62.8)	17.4 (63.3)	16.3 (61.3)	14.2 (57.6)	12.5 (54.5)	10.3 (50.5)	9.8 (49.6)	10.1 (50.2)	10.9 (51.6)	12.6 (54.7)	13.9 (57.0)	15.9 (60.6)	13.4 (56.1)
Average precipitation mm (inches)	62.4 (2.46)	55.2 (2.17)	81 (3.2)	60.2 (2.37)	38.5 (1.52)	31.7 (1.25)	35.9 (1.41)	67.5 (2.66)	44.2 (1.74)	86.5 (3.41)	93.7 (3.69)	62.5 (2.46)	719.3 (28.34)
Average rainy days	14	12	14	12	9	10	10	12	12	14	13	13	145
Mean daily sunshine hours	10	10	9	8	7	7	8	8	9	9	9	9	9
Source 1: Climate-Data.org
Source 2: Holiday Weather.com

== Education ==
- Oakhill College
- Keurbosch International Cambridge School
- Knysna High School
- Knysna Primary School
- Knysna Montessori
- Heatherhill School - International curriculum
- Stepping Stones (Grade 1–3)
- Fraaisig Primary
- Percy Madala Secondary School
- Knysna Secondary School
- Knysna Concordia High School

== Tourism ==
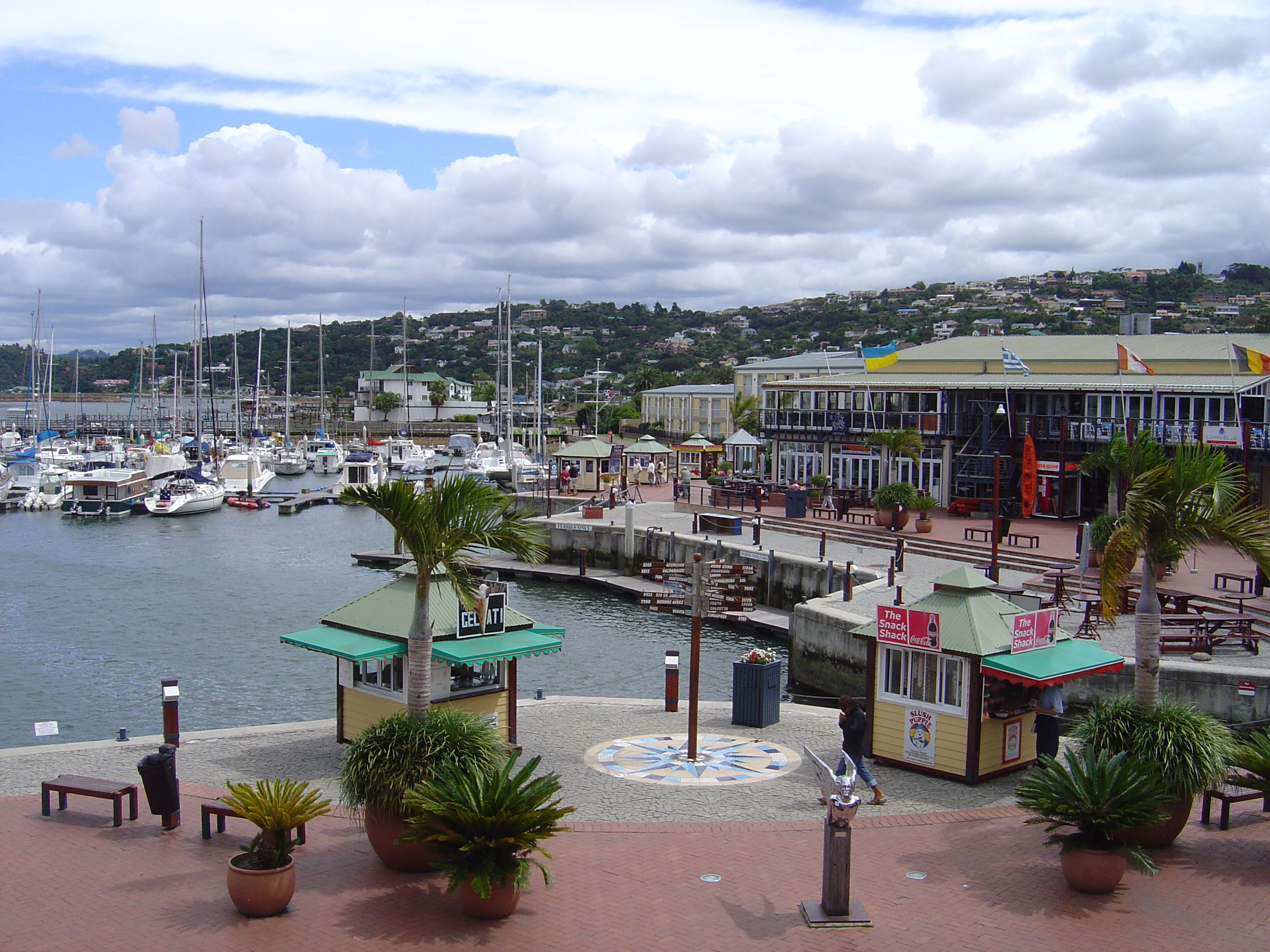
Knysna town as viewed from Knysna Quays (waterfront)

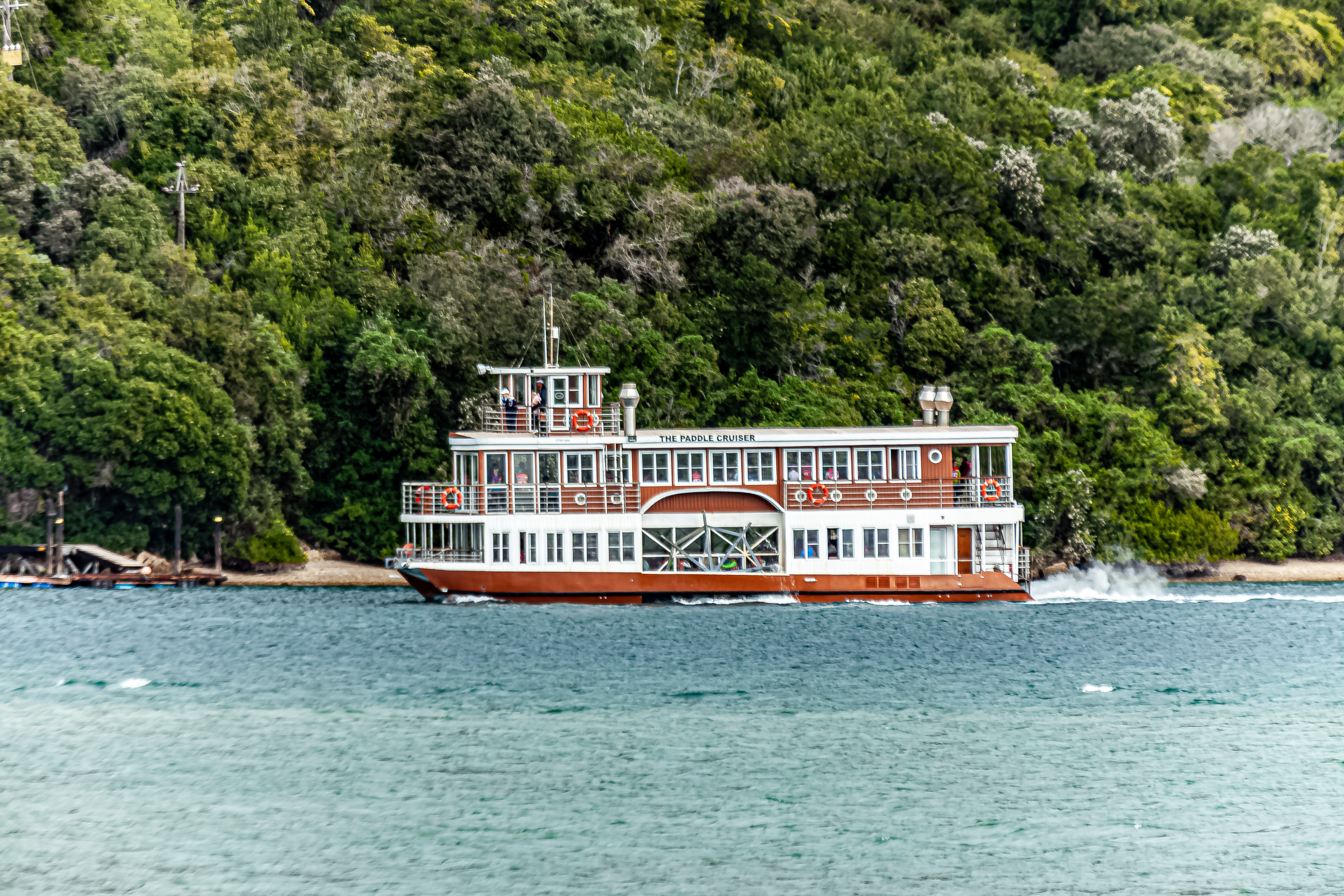
Cruise ship.

The town is a popular destination for both tourists and senior citizens entering retirement, especially among the British and former expatriates due to the year-round warm climate. Recently, the town has also become a preferred destination among golfers, as the town boasts several world class golf courses, including Pezula Golf Course, Simola Golf Course and the well established Knysna Golf Course situated on the lagoon. It is near the towns of Plettenberg Bay and George, where there are airports. Knysna is also home to Mitchell's Brewery although the company no longer brews beers in the town. The forest, rivers, estuary, and ocean surrounding the town are dotted with hiking trails and plenty of opportunities for outdoor activities. Hikers, runners, kayakers, swimmers, and fishermen are known to be particularly fond of Knysna.

=== Annual events ===
Knysna hosts a variety of annual events, which draw local and international visitors alike. Such events include the Knysna Oyster Festival in late June and/or early July; the Pink Loerie Mardi Gras and Arts Festival at the end of April and/or beginning of May; the Knysna Speed Festival takes place in the first week of May, the highlight of the week being the Simola Hillclimb. The Rastafarian Earth Festival takes place at the end of July, celebrating Rastafarian religion, culture and lifestyle.

==== Knysna Oyster Festival ====
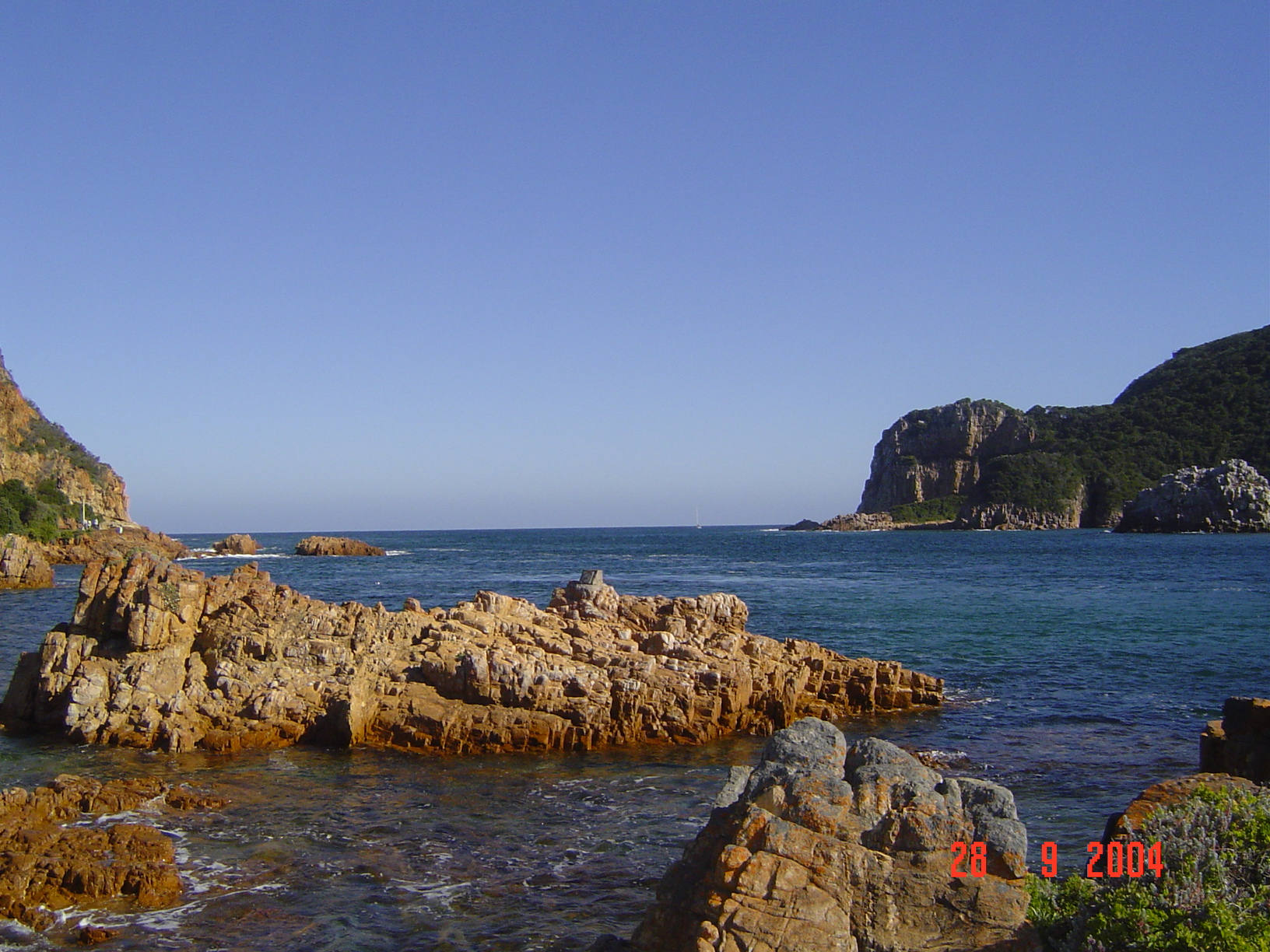
A view of the Knysna Heads

The Knysna Oyster Festival, held annually in late June/early July, is the town's oldest event. The duration of the festival is ten days. It was first held in 1983. Approximately 200,000 oysters are consumed over the 10-day period. Many sporting activities take place, such as rugby, golf, bowls, squash, cycling and marathons. The Knysna Forest Marathon and Half Marathon, as well as the Rotary Cycle Tour, draw many sporting enthusiasts to the town. The COVID-19 pandemic deferred the 2020 festival to 2021.

=== Knysna Speed Festival ===
The best-known hillclimb event in South Africa is held annually in early May during the Knysna Speed Festival, currently known as The Simola Hillclimb. It is a four-day event, starting with a four day Fan Fest starting on the Thursday prior to the event, before track action starts with Classic Car Friday reserved for cars built prior to 1990 and restricted to 65 entries. The King of the Hill Challenge (limited to 84 entries), for unrestricted cars in various classes, takes place over the weekend. The Saturday is for practice and pre-qualifying, while Sunday features the "hot" cars taking on final qualifying and the final runs. The course length is 1.9 km (1.2 mi) up Simola Hill. It is very fast with the 2022 winning average speed being 200.228 km/h (124.416 mph).. 2024 will be the fourteenth running of the event, which was founded in 2009. There was no event in 2013 nor 2020 due to COVID-19. Due to COVID-19 restrictions, it ran without spectators in 2021, with limited spectators in 2022 before returning to an unrestricted event in 2023. Former World Rally, and two-time World Rallycross, Champion Petter Solberg, former Formula One driver, and Le Mans winner, Mika Salo and five-time Finnish Rally champion Henning Solberg competed in the 2023 event.

== Coats of arms ==
=== Municipal arms ===
The Knysna municipality assumed a coat of arms in 1959, and registered them with the Cape Provincial Administration on 24 June 1960.

The arms, which were designed by Ivan Mitford-Barberton, are: Quarterly, I Or a white horse's head couped at the neck proper; II Azure a fern frond in bend sinister Argent; III Azure a yellowwood tree Or; IV Or an elephant's head caboshed proper (in layman's terms: the shield is quartered, 1 a white horse's head on a gold background, 2 a silver fern frond on a blue background, 3 a yellowwood tree on a blue background and 4 an elephant's head on a gold background). The crest is a sailing ship, and the motto Concilio et prudentia.

=== Divisional council arms ===
The Knysna divisional council (the local authority for the rural areas outside the town) assumed a coat of arms in 1961 and registered them with the provincial administration on 28 July 1961.

The arms, designed by Schalk Pienaar, were: Per saltire, I Or on a mount Vert a stinkwood tree proper; II & III Argent three bars wavy Azure; IV Vert the brig Knysna proper the sails charged with two lions rampant Gules and pennants flotant Azure. In layman's terms: the shield is divided into four sections by two diagonal lines, the top section displays a stinkwood tree on a golden background, the left and right sections display three wavy blue stripes against a silver background, and the bottom section displays a brig named 'Knysna' with red lions on the sails and a blue pennant flying from the mast. The motto was Pulchra terra Dei donum.

== Notable people ==
- Kurt Coleman (born 1990) – professional rugby union player
- Warrick Gelant (born 1995) – professional rugby union player
- Caspar Lee (born 1994) – YouTube personality
- Rudolf Eric Koertzen (1949–2022) – international cricket umpire
- D. C. S. Oosthuizen (1926–1969) – philosopher, a critic of Apartheid; born here
- George Rex (1765–1839) – founder of Knysna, landowner and timber merchant
- Eric Robinson (1891–1982) – opened first private veterinary practice in Knysna
- William Smith (born 1939) – television science and mathematics teacher
- Charles Wilhelm Thesen (1856–1940) – shipowner and timber merchant
- Alan Winde (born 1965) – 8th Premier of the Western Cape
- Josh Pieters (born 1993) – YouTube personality
- Mathrin Simmers (born 1988) - professional women rugby union player
- Rob Still (born 1955) - mining executive, owner of De Rustica Olive Estate

== See also ==
- Knysna Municipality, Western Cape
- Knysna-Amatole montane forests
- Knysna elephants
- Knysna Yacht Club
- Knysna seahorse
- List of heritage sites in Knysna
- Fiela's Child
- Dalene Matthee
- Pledge Nature Reserve
