= R341 (South Africa) =

Regional route in South Africa

Regional route R341
- R341 route map

Route information
- Length: 70 km (43 mi)

Major junctions
- East end: N9 between Uniondale and Willowmore
- R339 north of Uniondale
- West end: N12 in De Rust

Location
- Country: South Africa

Highway system
- Numbered routes of South Africa
← R340	→ R342

The R341 is a Regional Route in South Africa that connects the N12 at De Rust in the west and the N9 between Uniondale and Willowmore in the east.
