= Karoo to Coast =

Annual mountain bike race in South Africa

The Karoo to Coast is an annual 100 km mountain bike race held in September down the Prince Alfred's Pass from Uniondale to Knysna in South Africa. In 2007 it was voted one of the top ten mountain bike races in the country. All proceeds from the race go to the Lions Clubs International SightFirst program for sight restoration surgery for the poor.

Started in 1999, the Karoo to Coast is considered extremely arduous. 93% of the route is on gravel roads, from a high point of 1045 m down to sea level, with many long and gruelling climbs, often in high temperatures. The first 15 km section follows the "Ou Wapad" or wagon trail, possibly the only technical portion of the race. The rest is on good gravel, but with many ascents and fast speeds. Leaders usually finish in about 3 hours, though the route's scenic beauty, as it crosses the Outeniqua Mountains and winds through the dense indigenous forest of Gouna near the end, rewards those who take their time.

More than 3000 riders took part in the 2012 race, which also saw the death of a 55-year-old male competitor from a cardiac arrest in the race's closing stages.

== 2012 Top Results ==
Men:

- 1. Charles Keey 3h:03:13
- 2. Renay Groustra 3h:07:03
- 3. Carel Kriek 3h:07:30

Women:

- 1. Ariane Kleinhans 3h:31:33
- 2. Jenne Stenerhag 3h:31:35
- 3. Ischen Stopforth 3h:32:32

== Links ==
- Maps and profiles of route
