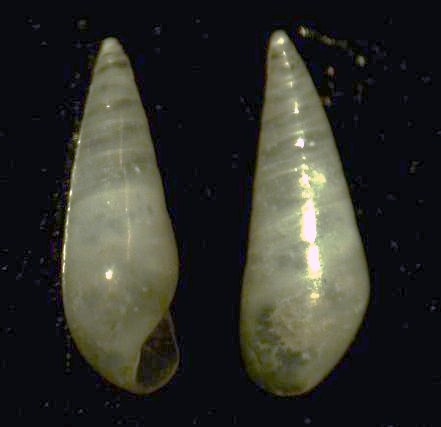
- Shell of Melanella algoensis

Scientific classification
- Kingdom: Animalia
- Phylum: Mollusca
- Class: Gastropoda
- Subclass: Caenogastropoda
- Order: Littorinimorpha
- Family: Eulimidae
- Genus: Melanella
- Species: M. algoensis

Binomial name
- Melanella algoensis (E. A. Smith, 1901)

Synonyms
- Eulima algoensis E. A. Smith, 1901

= Melanella algoensis =

Species of gastropod

Melanella algoensis is a species of sea snail, a marine gastropod mollusk in the family Eulimidae. The species is one of multiple species known to exist within the genus, Melanella.

== Description ==
The length of the shell attains 8 mm, is diameter 2 mm.

(Original description in Latin) The small shell is white, polished, subulate, and slightly curved. It bears a narrow, translucent band immediately below the suture. The shell consists of approximately twelve whorls, which are slightly convex, increase gradually in size, and are separated by a very slightly oblique suture. The body whorl is rounded at the periphery.

The aperture is pear-shaped and does not quite equal one-fourth of the shell’s total length. The outer lip is arched and projects forward at the middle. The columella is slightly thickened and reflected, and is joined above to the outer lip by a thin callus.

== Distribution ==
This species occurs in the following locations:

- Madagascar
- South Africa (Algoa Bay)
