= R343 (South Africa) =

Regional route in South Africa

Regional route R343
- R343 route map

Location
- Country: South Africa

Highway system
- Numbered routes of South Africa
← R342	→ R344

The R343 is a Regional Route in South Africa that connects the N2 at Grahamstown in the north and Kenton-on-Sea and the R72 in the south.
