= R342 (South Africa) =

Regional route in South Africa

Regional route R342
- R342 route map

Location
- Country: South Africa

Highway system
- Numbered routes of South Africa
← R341	→ R343

The R342 is a Regional Route in South Africa. Its western origin is the R335 north of Addo. It heads east, traversing the Addo Elephant National Park. On the other side, it crosses the N10 and on the other side passes through Paterson. From Paterson, it heads south-east to the N2, where it is cosigned to the east for three kilometres. It then leaves the N2 heading south east to end at the R72.
