= Dutch Reformed Church, Uniondale =

Church in Uniondale, South Africa

Dutch Reformed Church
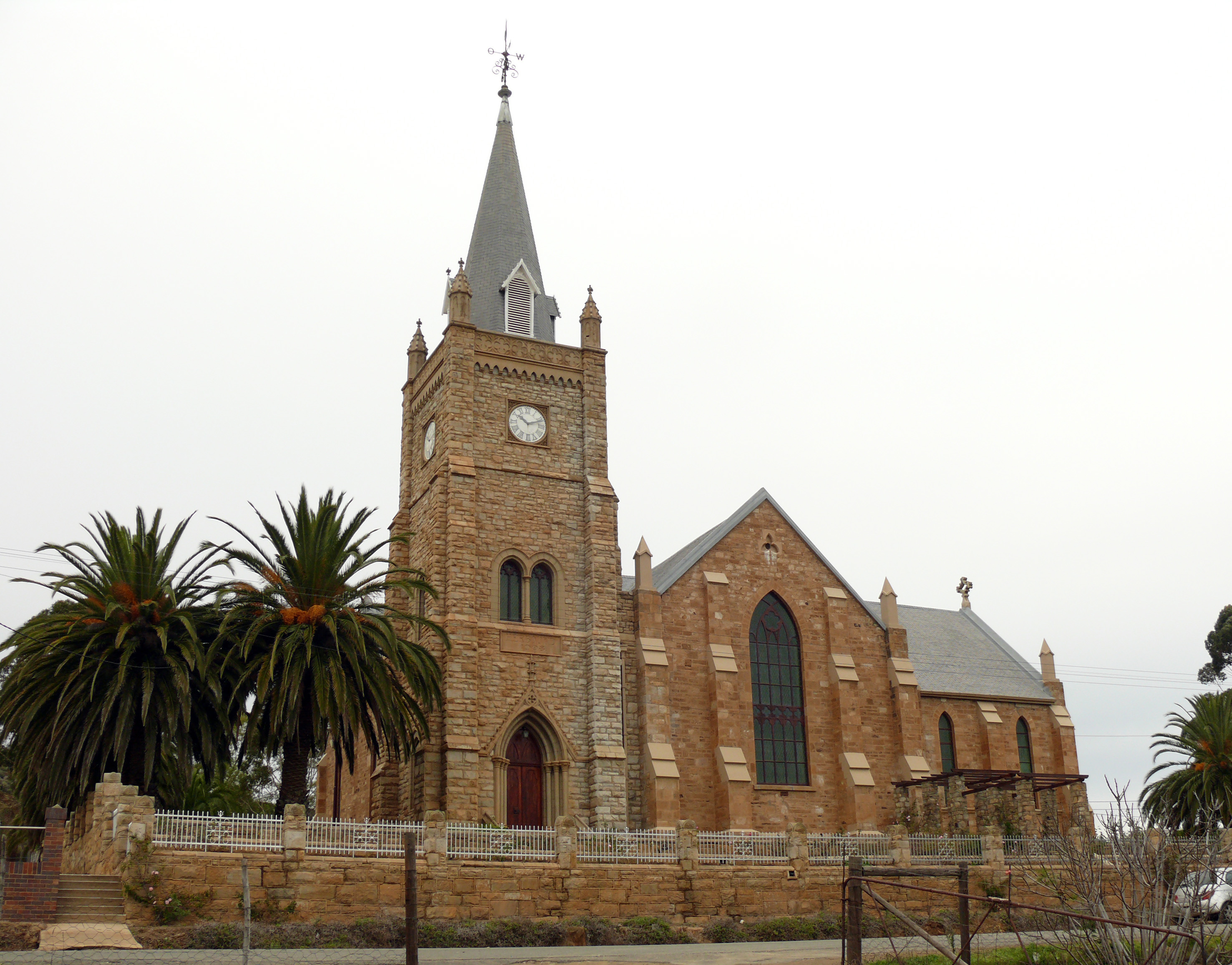
- Location: Uniondale
- Country: South Africa
- Denomination: Nederduits Gereformeerde Kerk

History
- Founded: 1866

Architecture
- Functional status: Church

The Dutch Reformed Church in Uniondale is a congregation of the Dutch Reformed Church with its center in the town of Uniondale, Western Cape.

== Background ==
The town came into being in 1856 when the owners of each of the two parts of the farm Rietvallei, Messrs. James Stewart and one Du Preez, each established a town, namely Hopedale and Lyon. The towns bordered each other, but there was disagreement between the two owners until they wrote a letter to the Dutch Reformed Church's Presbytery of George on 24 September 1865 in which they indicated that they would like to unite the towns as Uniondale. They therefore asked the presbytery to establish a congregation here from the NG congregation of George.

The Presbytery complied with the request on 19 October 1865 and on 20 January 1866 the congregation was officially established with Rev. A.G.M. Kuys van George as consultant. He served the congregation for four years in the first NG church building (erected between the two towns), which later belonged to the Christian Youth Association (CJV) and then to the Voortrekkers movement.

In January 1870, prop. P.D. Rossouw was confirmed as the first pastor of the congregation and was succeeded in 1878 by Rev. W.A. Joubert who worked here for 15 years and for the last 20 years of his ministry was pastor of the Dutch Reformed congregation of Noorder-Paarl, the so-called Toringkerk. During his time in office, a new church building was erected. Due to a dangerous crack in the first church tower, it was demolished and rebuilt in 1908, during the time of Rev. W.F. Louw, just three years after the mother congregation's church on George's Tower collapsed in 1905.

Rev. Joubert was followed by Rev. J. F. Botha, who made a special effort to settle the large church debt. A solid hewn stone ring wall was built at the church building during the ministry of Rev. D.G. van der Merwe (1922 to 1929). The existing church organ was built in 1930 at a cost of £1 200, collected by Rev. Van der Merwe. From the original congregation were separated: a part of De Rust (1900), the whole of Joubertina (1907), a part of Herold (1931) and finally two wards of the congregation of Misgund (1950).

== Sources ==
- (in English) Fransen, Hans. 2006. Old Towns and Villages of the Cape. Johannesburg and Cape Town: Jonathan Ball Publishers.
- (in Afrikaans) Heese, J.A. 1966. Die kerk in die wolke. Eeufees-Gedenkboek Uniondale 1866–1966. Uniondale: NG Kerkraad.
- (in Dutch) Maeder, ds. G.A. en Zinn, Christian. 1917. Ons Kerk Album. Kaapstad: Ons Kerk Album Maatschappij Bpkt.
- (in Afrikaans) De Kock, W.J. (hoofred.). 1972. Suid-Afrikaanse Biografiese Woordeboek Deel II. Pretoria: Raad vir Geesteswetenskaplike Navorsing.
- (in Afrikaans) Olivier, ds. P.L. (samesteller). 1952. Ons gemeentelike feesalbum. Kaapstad en Pretoria: N.G. Kerk-uitgewers.
