= R335 (South Africa) =

Road in South Africa

Regional route R335
- R335 route map

Route information
- Length: 163 km (101 mi)

Major junctions
- South end: N2 in St Georges Strand
- North end: R63 in Somerset East

Location
- Country: South Africa

Highway system
- Numbered routes of South Africa
← R334	→ R336

The R335 is a Regional Route in South Africa that connects Nelson Mandela Bay in the south to Somerset East to the north via Addo.

== Route ==
Its southern origin is at the N2 highway off-ramp between Wells Estate and St Georges Strand near Port Elizabeth. It heads in a northwesterly direction intersecting with the R102 (to Swartkops and Port Elizabeth), M17 (to Motherwell and Ibhayi) and R334 (to Coega) and passing through Wells Estate, Markman and Motherwell. It then heads north to reach Addo. Just after passing the town, the R336 is given off to the west. From Addo onwards, the town follows the western border of the Addo Elephant National Park. The next major intersection is with the R342 which heads east into the park. After leaving the park behind, the route reaches a staggered junction with the R400. It continues north for a further 60 kilometres to reach Somerset East, where the route ends intersecting the R63.
