= R340 (South Africa) =

Regional Route in the Western Cape, South Africa

Regional route R340
- R340 route map

Major junctions
- Northwest end: R339
- Southeast end: N2 near Plettenberg Bay

Location
- Country: South Africa

Highway system
- Numbered routes of South Africa
← R339	→ R341

The R340 is a Regional Route in South Africa that connects the N2 at Keurboomsrivier near Plettenberg Bay in the south-east with the R339 (heading to Uniondale and the R62).
