= Drillia erepta =

Scientific classification
- Kingdom: Animalia
- Phylum: Mollusca
- Class: Gastropoda
- Subclass: Caenogastropoda
- Order: Neogastropoda
- Superfamily: Conoidea
- Family: Drilliidae
- Genus: Drillia
- Species: D. erepta

Binomial name
- Drillia erepta K.H. Barnard, 1969

Synonyms
- Drillia algoensis Barnard, K.H., 1958

Species of gastropod

Drillia erepta is a species of sea snail, a marine gastropod mollusc in the family Drilliidae.

== Distribution ==
This marine species has been found off Algoa Bay, South Africa
