= Erica inordinata =

Scientific classification
- Kingdom: Plantae
- Clade: Tracheophytes
- Clade: Angiosperms
- Clade: Eudicots
- Clade: Asterids
- Order: Ericales
- Family: Ericaceae
- Genus: Erica
- Species: E. inordinata

Binomial name
- Erica inordinata H.A.Baker

Species of flowering plant

Erica inordinata, the Kammanassie erica, is a plant belonging to the genus Erica and is part of the fynbos. The species is endemic to the Western Cape and occurs at Uniondale. The plant's range is 50 km². The plant is considered rare and the habitat is stable.
