= R339 road =

R339 road may refer to:

- R339 road (Ireland)
- R339 road (South Africa)
