= R336 road =

R336 road may refer to:

- R336 road (Ireland)
- R336 road (South Africa)
