= Sophy Gray =

- Born: 5 January 1814; Easington, North Yorkshire, England
- Died: 27 April 1871 (aged 57); Cape Town
- Known for: Architecture

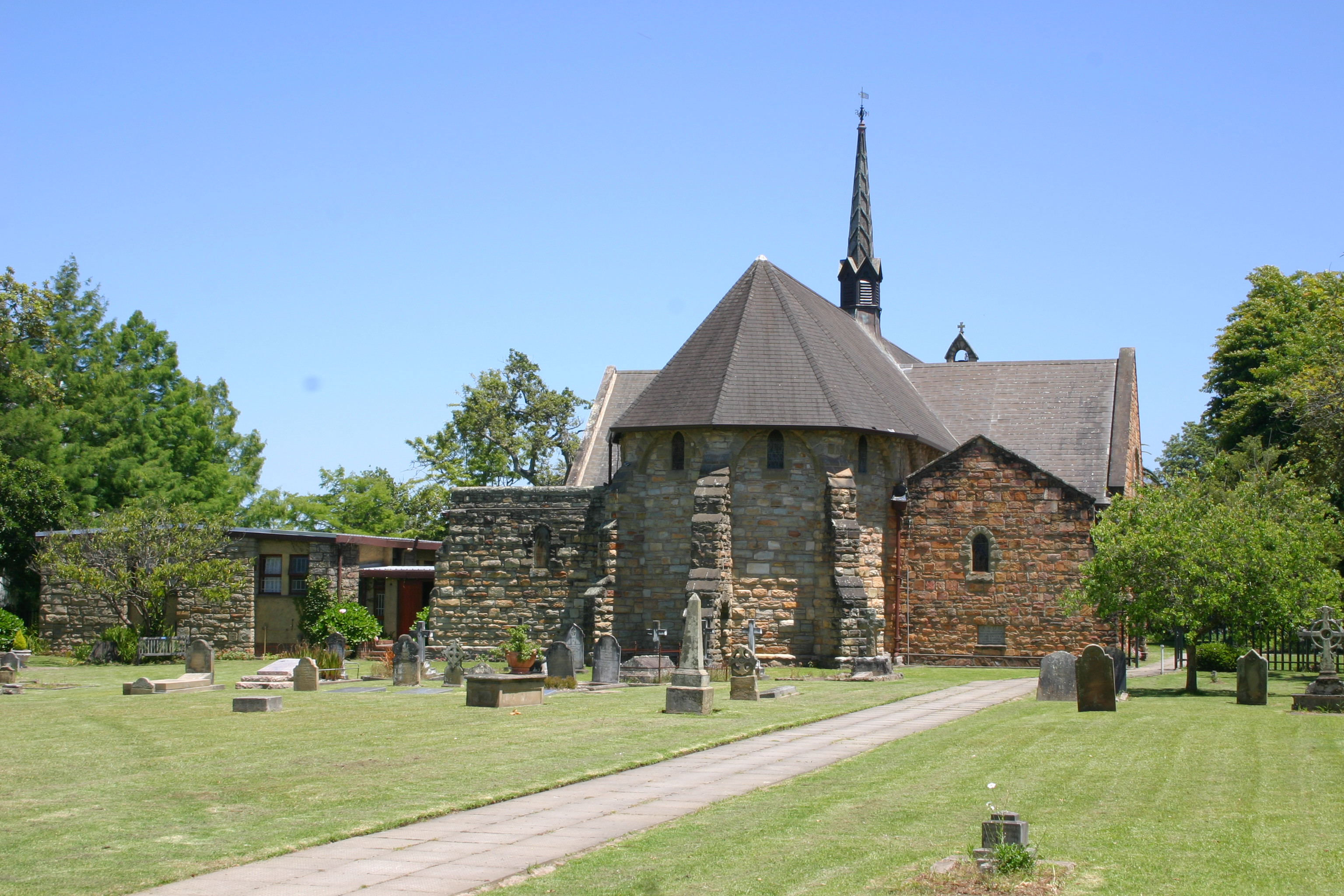
St Mark's Anglican Cathedral in George, which Gray designed

Sophy Gray or Sophia Gray (5 January 1814 – 27 April 1871), was a diocesan administrator, artist, architect, horsewoman and the wife of Cape Town bishop Robert Gray. Born at Easington in Yorkshire, the 5th daughter of country squire Richard Wharton Myddleton of Durham and Yorkshire, she died at Bishopscourt, Cape Town on 27 April 1871 and was buried in the graveyard of St Saviour's in Claremont. Day 1930 wrote "the constant companion of (Robert Gray's) travels, the untiring amanuensis and accountant, the skilful designer of churches, the brightness and stay of his home life at Bishopscourt."

== England ==
Sophy and her two sisters were raised in an affluent family, owning estates in North Riding and Durham. They were well-read and proficient riders from an early age, qualities that helped foster their friendship with the young Robert Gray. Sophy married Robert Gray in 1836 after a six-month engagement, when he was rector of Whitworth, Durham. Their honeymoon gave young Sophy a taste of things to come when she and Robert set out on a lengthy horseback trip, visiting the family holdings in two counties. For nine years their lives at Old Park and Whitworth, and the urban parish of Stockton remained fairly untroubled, but all this changed dramatically when Robert was placed on a shortlist for one of three new colonial bishoprics. He was chosen for the Cape of Good Hope.

== South Africa ==
In 1847 Sophy and Robert travelled to Cape Town where he was to establish a new colonial diocese, increase the number of clergy and establish new churches and schools. There were only ten Anglican churches in South Africa at that time. With his death 25 years later, this number had risen to 63. Having grown accustomed to the high standard of living enjoyed by bishops, including an episcopal palace, the Grays emigrated to the Cape with a retinue of servants, furniture and even an episcopal carriage.

The couple settled on the farm Boschheuvel, originally named Wijnberg and later renamed Bishopscourt, the original owner having been Jan van Riebeek, first Dutch Governor of the Cape. The farm lay on the slopes of Table Mountain, well-watered and with dense woodland. Here Sophy, using the old slave quarters, started a school for her five children and those of the community. Despite disliking social engagements, she kept open house to a constant stream of church officials and dignitaries, as well as managing Robert's diocese that included the Cape, Orange Free State, Natal and the islands of Tristan da Cunha and St. Helena.

Sophy Gray had brought along architectural plans of churches that could be adapted to the design of churches and schools for the new Anglican parishes that were to be established throughout South Africa. Both Sophy and her husband favoured the neo-Gothic style of church architecture which was fashionable in Britain at that time and advocated by the ecclesiologists, and disliked the Romanesque style. Even so, Sophy and Robert Gray felt that church design should not stick slavishly to the Early English Period, but should show some diversity.

She not only filled the role of architect, but kept records of the synods, their meetings and official ceremonies. She also kept records of correspondence and church chronicles. Being a competent horsewoman, she joined her husband on all but two of his extended trips. Her artistic skills were shown by the numerous water-colours and sketches she did, frequently used to illustrate her husband's journals. In all, the bishop would hardly have managed without her able assistance and knowledge. As if in recognition of her contribution, there is a stained glass window in St George's Cathedral, depicting her wearing a green riding habit and bonnet, though usually she wore a felt hat and plain riding dress, beneath which were close-fitting riding breeches of Chamois leather.

Capetonian Desmond Martin's doctoral thesis dealt with the churches established by the Grays. Of more than 50 churches built in South Africa during Robert Gray's bishopric, at least 40 were designed by Sophy. In 2005 Martin published a book titled "The Bishop's Churches" and illustrated with his water-colours and line drawings of her 40 churches, including St Paul's, Rondebosch, St Saviour's, Claremont, St Peter's, Plettenberg Bay, St James, Graaff-Reinet and St Jude's, Oudtshoorn.

== Churches designed by Sophy Gray ==
Church	Town	Year	Location	Image
St Paul's Church (Note: St Paul's, Eerste River is closer to Faure)	Eerste River, Western Cape	1848	34°01′38″S 18°44′40″E	
St James' Church	Graaff-Reinet	1848	32°15′03″S 24°32′12″E	
St Paul's Church	Rondebosch, Cape Town	1849	33°57′44″S 18°28′09″E	
St George's Church	Knysna	1849	34°02′07″S 23°03′01″E	
School Chapel	Beaufort West	1849	32°20′43″S 22°34′56″E	
Christ Church	Colesberg	1849	30°43′11″S 25°05′51″E	
St Mark's Church	George	1849	33°57′28″S 22°27′30″E	
Holy Trinity Church	Caledon	1850	34°13′54″S 19°25′39″E	
St Saviour's Church (Note: St Saviour's, Claremont was demolished in 1904.)	Claremont, Cape Town	1850	33°59′02″S 18°27′54″E	
Holy Trinity Church	Belvidere, Knysna	1851	34°02′28″S 22°59′57″E	
St Peter's Church	Pietermaritzburg	1851	29°36′17″S 30°22′34″E	
Christ Church (Note: Christ Church, Swellendam was demolished and a new church built on the old foundations.)	Swellendam	1852	34°01′20″S 20°26′27″E	
Christ Church	Beaufort West	1852	32°20′45″S 22°34′57″E	
St James, The Great, Anglican Church	Worcester	1852	33°38′45″S 19°26′42″E	
St John the Baptist Church	Louvain Farm, Schoonberg near Herold	1853	33°48′41″S 22°38′45″E	
All Saints Church	Somerset East	1854	32°43′01″S 25°35′09″E	
St Paul's Church (Note: St Paul's, North End was demolished in 1959.)	North End, Port Elizabeth	1854	33°56′43″S 25°35′23″E	
St Matthew's Church	Riversdale, Western Cape	1854	34°05′34″S 21°15′31″E	
School Chapel	Mossel Bay	1855		
St Andrew's Chapel (Note: St Andrew's Chapel, Newlands is no longer in use as a church)	Newlands, Cape Town	1856	33°58′18″S 18°27′16″E	
Armstrong Memorial Chapel (Note: Armstrong Memorial Chapel was demolished in 1950.)	St. Andrew's College, Grahamstown	1856	33°18′27″S 26°31′07″E	
St Peter's Church	Cradock	1857	32°10′20″S 25°36′58″E	
Church of St Mary the Virgin	Woodstock, Cape Town	1859	33°55′36″S 18°26′47″E	
All Saints Church	Bredasdorp	1859	34°32′06″S 20°02′25″E	
St Andrew's Chapel	Ceres	1860	33°22′10″S 19°18′39″E	
St Jude's Church	Oudtshoorn	1860	33°35′15″S 22°12′11″E	
Constantia Chapel (Note: Constantia Chapel was demolished in 1953)	near Cape Town	1860		
All Saints Chapel	Durbanville	1860	33°50′05″S 18°38′58″E	
St Mary's Church	Robertson	1861	33°48′05″S 19°52′56″E	
St Thomas' Mission Station	Rondebosch, Cape Town	1864	33°57′46″S 18°28′37″E	
St John's Church	Clanwilliam	1864	32°10′44″S 18°53′34″E	
St Mark's Chapel (Note: St Mark's Chapel, District Six was demolished in the 1960s.)	District Six, Cape Town	1865		
St Patrick's Church	Umzinto, KwaZulu-Natal	1868	30°18′37″S 30°39′53″E	
St Augustine's Chapel (Note: St Augustine's Chapel has become an Afrikaans Protestant Church after the dissolution of the Anglican congregation.)	Fraserburg	1869	31°55′00″S 21°30′47″E	
St Luke's Mission Church (Note: St Luke's Mission Church, Swellendam is now used by the Old Apostolic Church.)	Swellendam	1869	34°01′13″S 20°26′40″E	
St John's Church	Victoria West	1869	31°24′13″S 23°06′45″E	
All Saints Church	Uniondale	1869	33°39′22″S 23°07′42″E	
St Mildred's Chapel	Montagu	1870	33°47′13″S 20°07′02″E	
St Peter's Church	Plettenberg Bay	1879	34°03′16″S 23°22′29″E	
St Matthew's Church	Willowmore	1880	33°17′44″S 23°29′20″E	

== See also ==
- Women in architecture
