= R339 (South Africa) =

Regional route in South Africa

Regional route R339

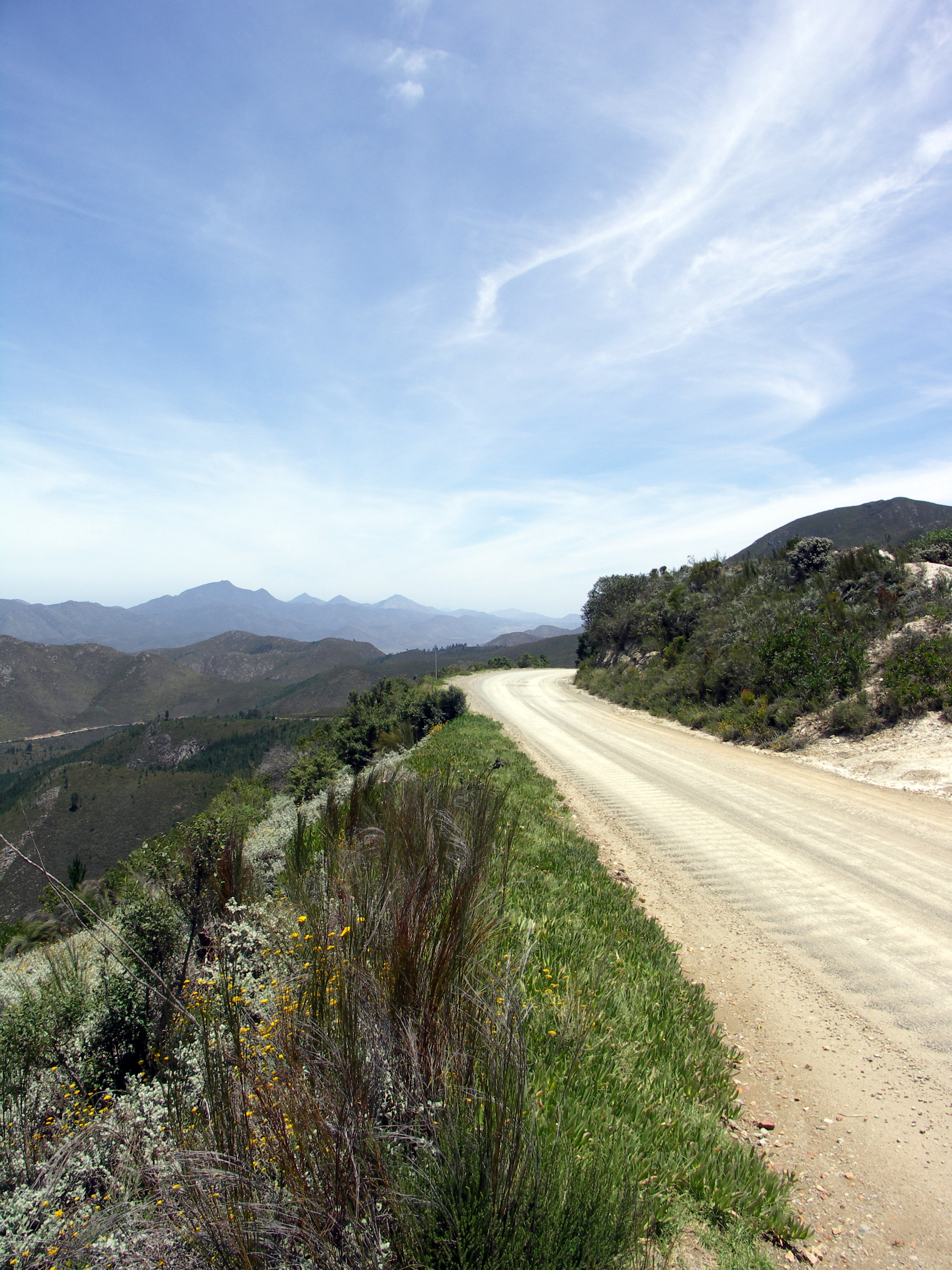

Route information
- Length: 103 km (64 mi)

Major junctions
- North end: R341 near Uniondale
- N9 in Uniondale; R62 in Avontuur; R340 near Knysna
- South end: N2 in Knysna

Location
- Country: South Africa

Highway system
- Numbered routes of South Africa
← R338	→ R340

The R339 is a Regional Route in South Africa that connects Knysna with Uniondale via Avontuur. It is primarily a gravel road and crosses the Langkloof Mountains at Prince Alfred's Pass.

== Route ==
Map

The R339 begins at an intersection with the N2 national route in the coastal town of Knysna, 5 kilometres east of the town centre. It heads north for 32 kilometres to meet the north-western terminus of the R340 and become the Prince Alfred's Pass. It continues north for another 36 kilometres to meet the R62 at a T-junction in Avontuur. The R339 joins the R62 eastwards up to the next junction, where the R339 becomes the road northwards. It becomes the Uniondale Poort Pass and heads for 11 kilometres to reach Uniondale, where it passes northwards through the town centre and crosses the Kammanassie River before reaching a junction with the N9 national route. The R339 joins the N9 northwards for 3 kilometres before the R339 becomes its own road northwards while the N9 bends to the north-east. The R339 heads north for 19 kilometres to end at a T-junction with the R341.

The tarred section of the road between Avontuur and Uniondale was closed in 2007 due to flood damage but was since re-opened.

== See also ==
- Keurbooms River
