= St. James the Great, Worcester =

Church in Western Cape, South Africa

St. James The Great
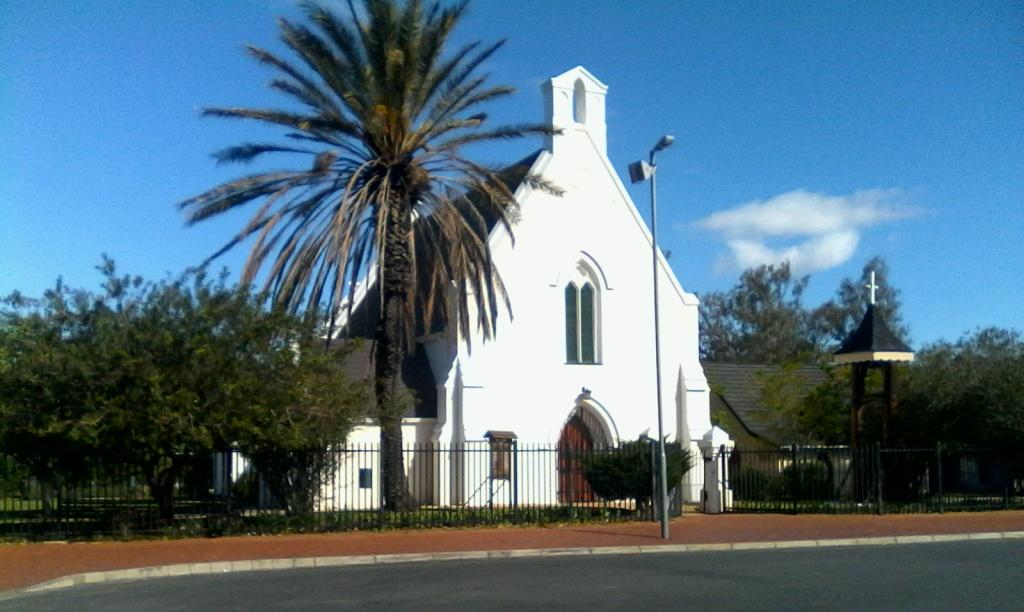
- St. James The Great
- Location: Worcester, Western Cape
- Country: South Africa
- Denomination: Anglican Church of South Africa

History
- Founded: 28 January 1859
- Founder: Robert Gray
- Dedication: Saint James

Administration
- Diocese: Diocese of False Bay

Clergy
- Bishop: Stafford Moses
- Rector: Clive Petorious

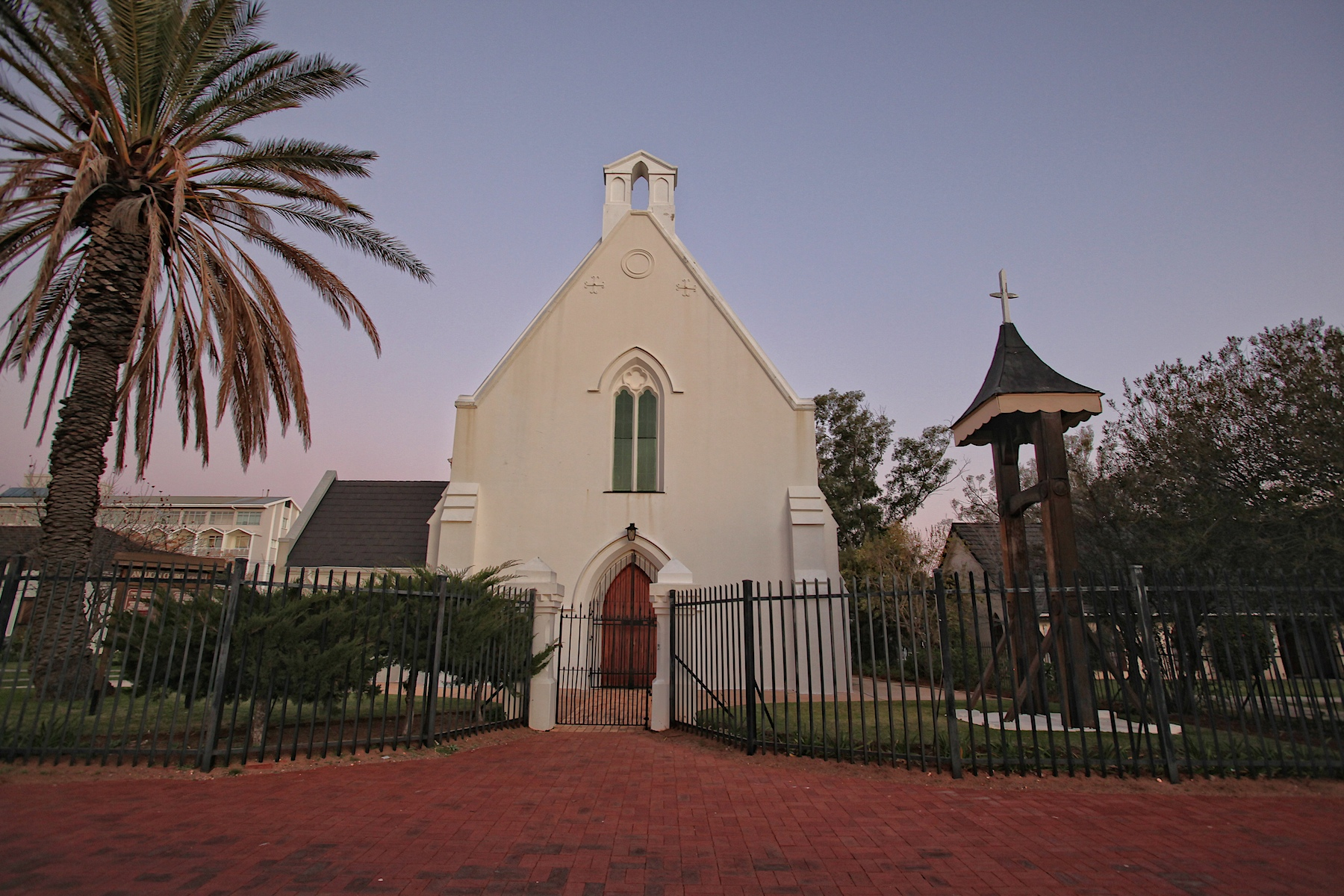
St James the Great Church, Waterloo Road, Worcester-001.jpg

St James the Great, Worcester is an Anglican church located in Worcester, South Africa.

== History ==
Robert Gray was consecrated as the first bishop of Cape Town in 1847, by 1851 the first Anglican minister to reside in Worcester, South Africa, John Martine, arrived in Worcester from England.

The church was designed by architect, Sophy Gray, the wife of Robert Gray. On Wednesday, December 15, 1852, the foundation stone of the nave was laid by the Very Reverend William Newman, Dean of Cape Town, but building was not commenced until September 1855. The church was completed on 8 January 1859 and opened for divine service on 28 January 1859 officiated by Henry Douglas, the Dean of Cape Town. On 23 October 1859, the nave of the church was consecrated by Bishop Gray. On 16 May 1876 the chancel was added and was dedicated to the archbishop of Cape Town, William West Jones.

Past rectors of this parish

1. John Melville Martine, M.A. (1851–1853)
2. (vacant) (1853–1857)
3. John Mynhard (1857–1880)
4. James Alexander Hewitt (1880–1890)
5. Robert Sheard, M.A. (1891–1921)
6. William Amcoats (1922–1935)
7. Arthur Pierce-Jones (1935–1938)
8. William Angus C.Kingon L.TH. (1938–1940)
9. Frank Leslie Sugget, M.C. (1940–1943)
10. Brian Tindall Page, M.A. (1943–1948)
11. Desmond Alfred Wolfe, L.TH.(1948–1952)
12. Alfred Walton Carter, M.A. (1952–1955)
13. Conrad C.Silberbauer, M.A. (1955–1958)
14. Arthur Rowe Luman, L.TH. (1959–1961)
15. Roy Dovery Lewis (1961–1965)
16. Ian R. Macintosh B.A., L.TH. (1965–1968)
17. Andrew Watson (1968–1972)
18. Albert Edward Wilton (1973–1974)
19. Thomas Royle Cripps (1975–1978)
20. Heinrich E. Mahr (Feb.–Apr.1978, deceased)
21. Christian Smuts Viljoen (1978–1984)
22. Glen Logan (1985–1989)
23. John A. Hanson (1989–1995)
24. Robert De Maar (1995–1998)
25. Jacques V.X. Jefferies (1999–2005)
26. Vincent Charles Bastiaan (2006–2010)
27. Victor Adams (2011–2016)
28. Clive Pretorious (2016–)
