= R336 (South Africa) =

Regional route in South Africa

Regional route R336
- R336 route map

Route information
- Length: 48.9 km (30.4 mi)

Major junctions
- West end: R75
- East end: Addo

Location
- Country: South Africa

Highway system
- Numbered routes of South Africa
← R335	→ R337

The R336 is a Regional Route in South Africa. It runs east/west. The western origin is the R75. From there, it passes through Kirkwood and ends at Addo at the R335.
