= St Georges Strand =

Seaside suburb of Port Elizabeth, South Africa

- Location within Eastern Cape Location within South Africa
- Coordinates: 33°49′25″S 25°39′19″E
- Country: South Africa
- Province: Eastern Cape
- Municipality: Nelson Mandela Bay
- Main Place: Port Elizabeth

Area
  - Total: 7.49 km^{2} (2.89 sq mi)

Population
  - Total: 103
  - Density: 13.8/km^{2} (35.6/sq mi)

Racial makeup (2011)
  - Black African: 65.0%
  - Coloured: 16.5%
  - White: 18.5%
  - Other: 0%

First languages (2011)
  - Xhosa: 59.2%
  - Afrikaans: 31.1%
  - English: 4.8%
  - Other: 4.9%
- Time zone: UTC+2 (SAST)
- Postal code (street): 6001

St Georges Strand is a coastal village located along the Algoa Bay in the Eastern Cape, South Africa and is approximately 20 kilometres (12 mi) north of Port Elizabeth (now Gqeberha).

== Geography ==
St Georges Strand is one of Port Elizabeth's northernmost suburbs, bounded by Coega to the north, Wells Estate to the west and Bluewater Bay to the south.

== Beach ==
The beach at St Georges Strand is Port Elizabeth's northernmost beach. Swimming at the beach is not advised due to violent waters and waves. This is the reason why the beach is not very often frequented by locals or is known very well in the Port Elizabeth area. However lifeguards are on duty during the peak/summer holiday season.

== Roads ==
St Georges Strand can be accessed by turning off the N2 highway (to Gqeberha and Makhanda) onto King George's Avenue. King George’s Avenue continues north-westwards as the R335 (St George Street) to Motherwell, Wells Estate, Markman and Addo.
