= St Mark's Cathedral, George, Western Cape =

Coordinates: 33.95775°S 22.458444°E

St Mark's Cathedral
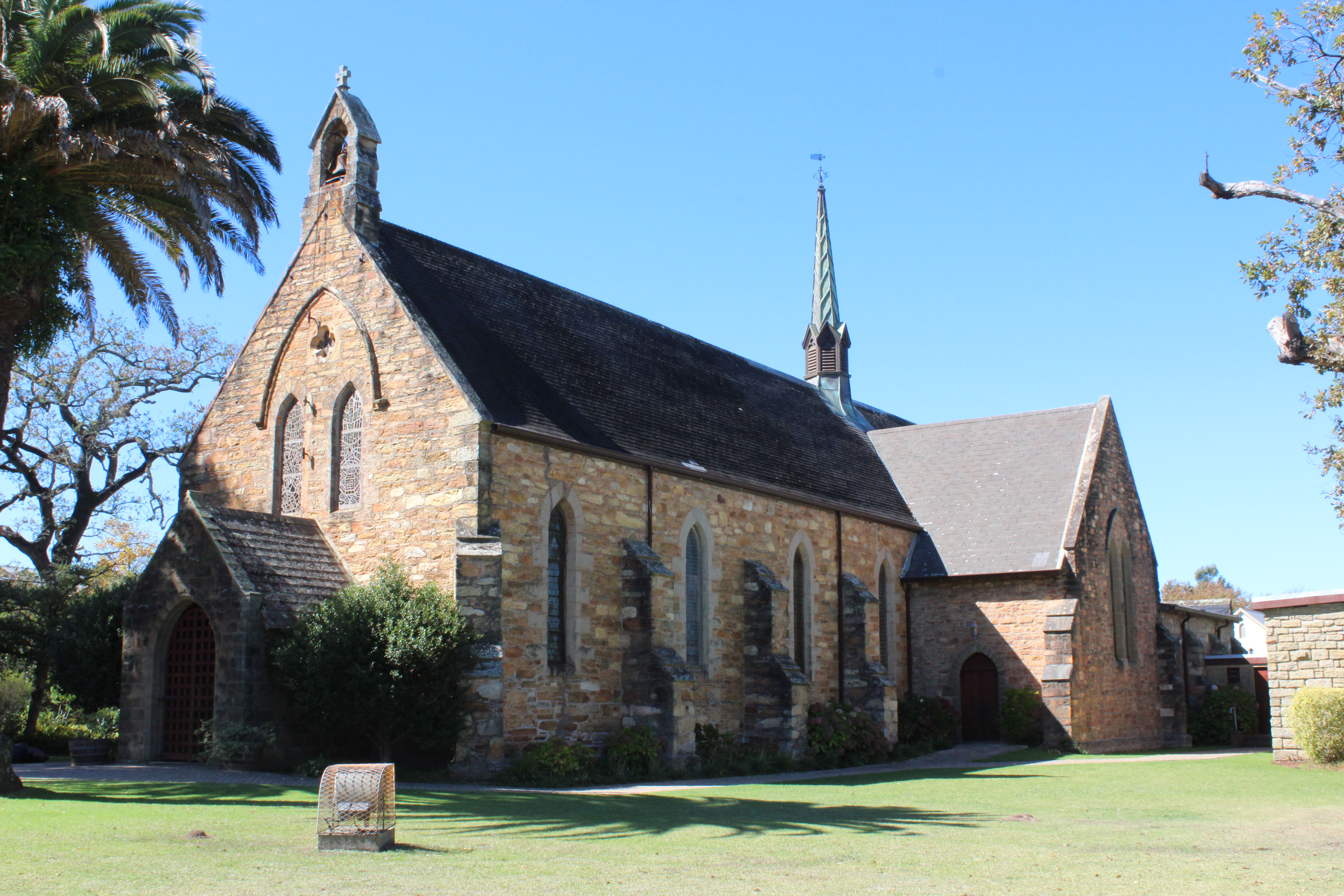
- St Mark's Cathedral
- Location: George, Western Cape
- Country: South Africa
- Denomination: Anglican

Architecture
- Functional status: active

Administration
- Province: Cape Town
- Diocese: George

Clergy
- Bishop: Edwin Desmond Pockpass

The Cathedral of St Mark in George, South Africa is the seat of the Diocese of George of the Anglican Church of Southern Africa. The present bishop is Edwin Desmond Pockpass.

== History ==
On April 23, 1811, a portion of the District of Swellendam, east of the Gouritz River, was proclaimed a separate district and named George Town after the reigning British monarch, King George III. In the following year, the Dutch Reformed Church appointed its first minister, and soon after that the London Missionary Society established a mission station at Hooge Kraal (1813). The town which developed around the mission later became known as Pacaltsdorp, named after their long serving minister, the Reverend Charles Pacalt.

George Town was one of the few villages in which the government had placed a colonial chaplain to serve the English community. He was permitted to use the Dutch church for Anglican services, and in 1848 a meeting was held to discuss ways and means of establishing a church of their own, so subscription lists were opened to collect funds. In February 1848 Bishop Robert Gray, father of the Church of the Province of Southern Africa, arrived in the Cape. It was most opportune that his wife Sophy, who designed the George church, should have accompanied him on his first visitation. This gave her the singular honor of laying the foundation stone on October 23rd, 1849 and this little church was consecrated as St. Marks Church by Bishop Gray on December 7th, 1850.

The south and north transepts were both donated by Dr. R A St Leger: the former in memory of his first wife Annie Brett in 1934 and the latter some 20 years later in memory of his father, Frederick York St Leger. The north transept was built simultaneously with the Chapel of St Mary, commonly known as the Lady Chapel, and these were consecrated on the 15 June 1954. The chapel was in memory of Bishop Sidwell, the first Bishop of George, and the men from this area who fell in the two World Wars.

The first columbarium was built in the Graveyard in 1963 and the second in 1971 from stone donated by one of the parishioners. New choir stalls were installed in the Chancel in 1964 only to be moved to their present position in more recent times. Pew heating in alternate pews was installed in 1968 and the old flooring needed to be replaced with treated timber in 1984. The few remaining yellow wood pews were by then very fragile and a St Leger Memorial Bequest enabled the Church to replace them with matching meranti pews.

The actual date of the building of the porch cannot be determined with accuracy, but it would seem that the only meaningful renovations between 1861 and 1924 were in 1906, and from other evidence this would appear to be a very likely date.

The cathedral was re-roofed in 1964 and the roof tiles above the Lady Chapel and the two transepts were replaced in 1988. The cornerstone of the chapter house was laid in September 1978.

THE CATHEDRAL TIMELINE

1848

Decision taken to raise money for church building. Bishop Gray and his wife Sophy arrived in Cape Town. The Bishop's wife designed the church and the foundation stone was laid on 23 October 1849

1850

The church was consecrated on 7 December 1850. Four stonemasons were employed from Scotland and the stone was quarried at Victoria Heights. The church seated 200 congregants

1865

Building alterations and extensions commenced in 1861 and were completed in 1865. The alterations cost £475. Access to the chancel was through a high archway set further back in the nave and an organ chamber was constructed in the northern side of the chancel, while the vestry led off the southern side. Three stained glass windows were set into the eastern wall

1874–1908

Original harmonium was replaced, the first organ was purchased, and a porch was added.

1911

St Mark's parish church became a cathedral

1924

Further alterations to the cathedral were undertaken. A chancel was added and the vestry and organ loft were enlarged. A side chapel was added and the cathedral now seated 450. A gallery was built over the west door where the organ pipes were placed. Electric lights were used for the first time and a fleche or short spire surmounting the crossing was erected for ventilation purposes.

1934

The south transept was built at a cost of £1000

1947/8

The cathedral was re-roofed and microphones were introduced

1954

The north transept and the Lady Chapel were built

1957

New Curate's house built on the corner of Cathedral and Meade Streets

1962

A new Muller organ was bought and installed with 1400 pipes, 35 stops, 35 speaking stops, 2 manuals and 13 couplers and was considered to be the fourth largest organ in South Africa's Anglican churches

1964–1968

New choir stalls installed in the chancel, and heating panels were installed

c1973-1977

Gallery extended to allow for the organ console to be accommodated

1978

Corner stone for the new Chapter House was laid and the Chapter House was enlarged within a few years

1988

Original vestry cubicles removed and the two interleading arches were glassed in to provide a Resource Centre/Library as well as doubling up as a Cry Room for families with young children as well as a Resource Centre.

1990

The St Mark's Hanging Cross, designed by Cecil Skotnes and crafted by David Brown, was placed above the chancel steps

1991

Two high wooden gates were installed at the entrance to the porch, in memory of Canon Charles Bull

c1992

Enclosure of the cathedral grounds.

2007

The cathedral became a member of the international Community of the Cross of Nails
