= Doddington (ship) =

British sailing ship

Coordinates: 33°50.06′S 26°17.40′E

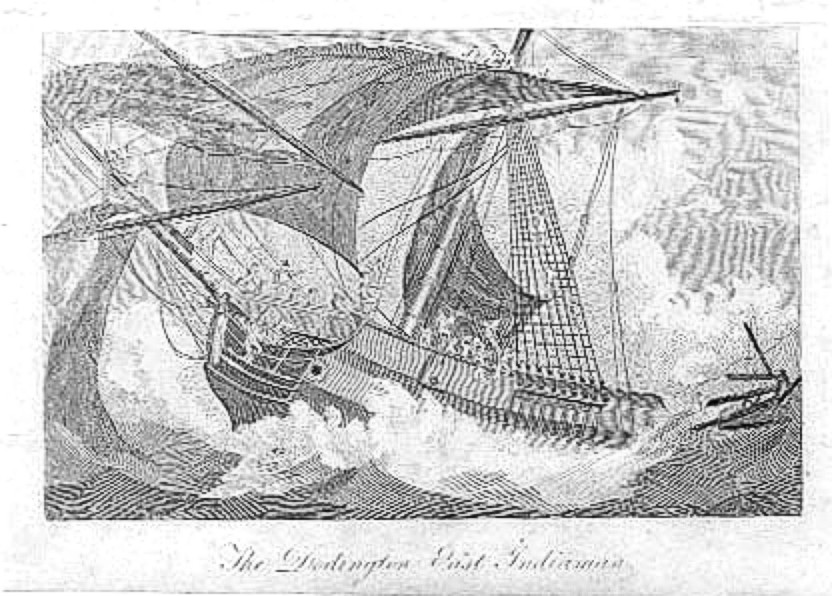

History

Great Britain
- Owner: John Hallett
- Operator: British East India Company
- Builder: Wells, Deptford
- Launched: 19 March 1748
- Fate: Wrecked, 17 July 1755 in Algoa Bay

General characteristics
- Type: East Indiaman
- Tons burthen: 499, (Note: It was standard practice for some time for the EIC to declare a burthen of 499 tons. By doing so the company avoided the expense of paying for a chaplain as required by law for vessels of 500 tons or over.) or 550, or 600, (bm)
- Propulsion: Sail
- Armament: 26 guns

Doddington was an East Indiaman of the British East India Company (EIC). She made two trips for the EIC to Bombay, China, and Mokha. On her third trip she was sailing to India to remain there when she was wrecked on 17 July 1755 at Bird Island in Algoa Bay, near present-day Port Elizabeth. The ship was carrying a hoard of gold belonging to Clive of India, which modern treasure hunters looted. The controversy over these depredations resulted in changes to international maritime treaties to better protect underwater cultural heritage.

== Successful voyages ==
=== First voyage (1748–1749) ===
Captain Benjamin Mason left the Downs on 8 June 1748, bound for Bombay and China. Doddington reached the Cape on 15 September, Cochin on 5 February 1749, and Tellicherry on 20 February, and arrived at Bombay on 28 March. She was again at Tellicherry on 1 May. From there she reached Kedah on 10 June and Malacca on 11 July, and arrived at Whampoa on 9 August. Homeward bound, she crossed the Second Bar (about 20 miles before Whampoa), on 4 December, reached Saint Helena on 3 March 1750, and arrived at Long Reach on 21 May.

=== Second voyage (1752–1754) ===
Captain Norton Hutchinson left the Downs on 20 March 1752, bound for Bombay and Mokha. Doddington reached Lisbon on 10 April and St Augustine's Bay on 3 August. She arrived at Bombay on 9 October. She then spent the period 22 October to 13 November cruising, before again arriving at Bombay on 14 November. She sailed to Surat, which she reached on 26 December, and arrived at "Scindy Road" on 9 January 1753, before returning to Surat on 19 February. (Note: Scindy Road is probably the roadstead of Sindh, i.e., the waters off Karachi.) On 26 February she arrived at Bombay again. She reached Mangalore on 11 March and Tellicherry on 17 March, and arrived at Mokha on 16 April. By 16 September she was back at Bombay. From there she reached the Cape on 14 February 1754 and St Helena on 17 March, and arrived at Gravesend on 31 May.

== Wrecking ==
Doddington sailed from Dover on 22 April 1755 bound to Fort St George in India under the command of Captain James Sampson. She was to stay in India. Doddington sailed in the company of Stretham (carrying Clive of India), Pelham, Edgecote, and Houghton. The ships were separated en route to Porto Praya, but re-united again at the port where they all stopped to take on provisions. On 27 May 1755, the three ships departed the Cape Verde islands together, but once again separated after Sampson took a more southerly route than the other ships. After seven weeks, Doddington rounded the Cape of Good Hope. After sailing eastwards for a day, she was on a heading of East-North-East, when at 1 am she struck a rock in Algoa Bay.

Eastern Cape, South Africa

Of the original crew and passengers of 270, only 23 initially survived while the other 247 passengers and crew died with the ship. The castaways subsisted for seven months on fish, birds, and eggs on a nearby island, which they named Bird Island. (Note: The island group had previously been named Inhéus Châos (low or flat islands) by Vasco da Gama.) One of their number, a carpenter, was able to help them build a sloop, the Happy Deliverance, on which they were finally able to get off the island on 16 February 1756. The sloop was seaworthy enough to take the survivors on an eventful journey up the east coast of Africa via St Lucia and Delagoa Bay, where the survivors sold her before travelling on to India. Captain Norton Hutchinson, now captain of the East Indiaman Carnarvon, took them on board and carried them to Madras.

== Salvage ==
Doddington was carrying a consignment of gold and silver, known as "Clive of India's Gold", which was controversially looted in recent times by Port Elizabeth treasure hunters. A third of the 1,200 gold coins were eventually returned to South Africa after a four-year legal wrangle in London. The high-profile court case highlighted various shortcomings in both South African and international maritime law. The United Nations Educational, Scientific and Cultural Organisation monitored the case closely, as it set an important precedent for the UNESCO Convention on the Protection of the Underwater Cultural Heritage that it subsequently published.

== Cultural impact ==
In September 1867, at the Theatre Royal, The Dramatic Club of Port Elizabeth staged a locally written play "Treasure at Woody Cape", dealing with the legend of the Doddington's treasure.
