= Holy Trinity Church, Belvidere =

Holy Trinity Church
- Duthie Church
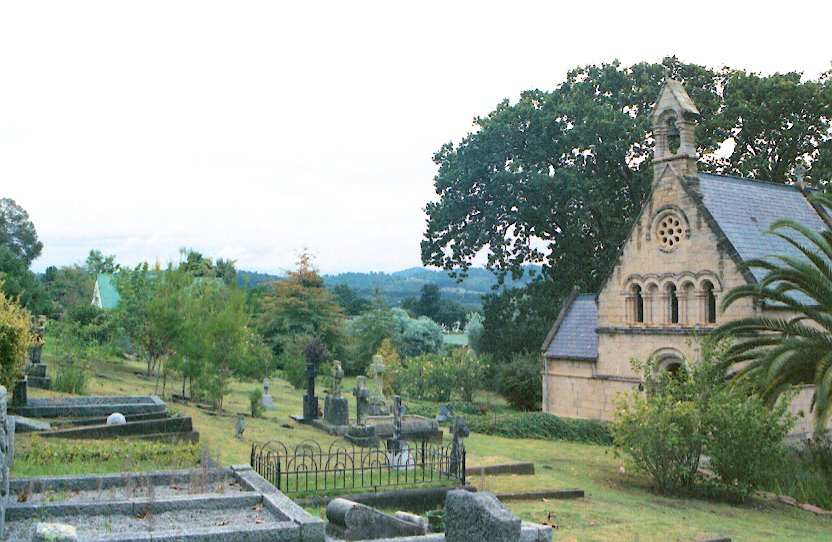
- The church with its graveyard.
- Holy Trinity Church
- 34.0411887°S 22.9990575°E
- Location: Knysna
- Country: South Africa
- Denomination: Anglican

History
- Founded: 15 October 1851

Architecture
- Architect: Sophy Gray
- Style: Norman

The Holy Trinity Church is an Anglican Church in Belvidere, Knysna in the Western Cape Province of South Africa.

== History ==
The church came to be when Robert Gray was consecrated as the Bishop of Cape Town in 1840, Sir Thomas Henry Duthie along with his son-in-law travelled to meet Gray to discuss plans for churches in the Knysna and Plettenberg Bay areas.

The church was built between 1851 and 1853, while the foundation stone was laid on 15 October 1851. The church was designed by Sophia Gray. The church was modelled after the Norman churches of the 11th and 12th centuries. The first bishop of the church was Robert Gray, husband of Sophia Gray.

== Gallery ==
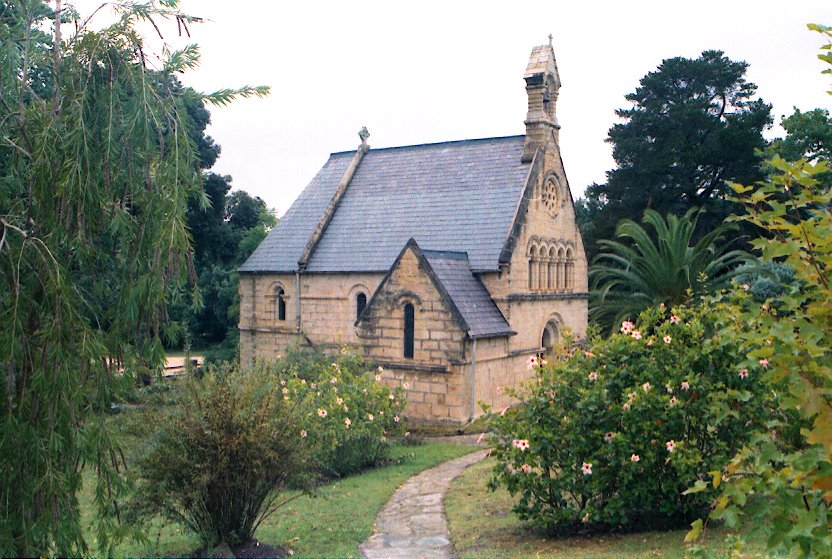

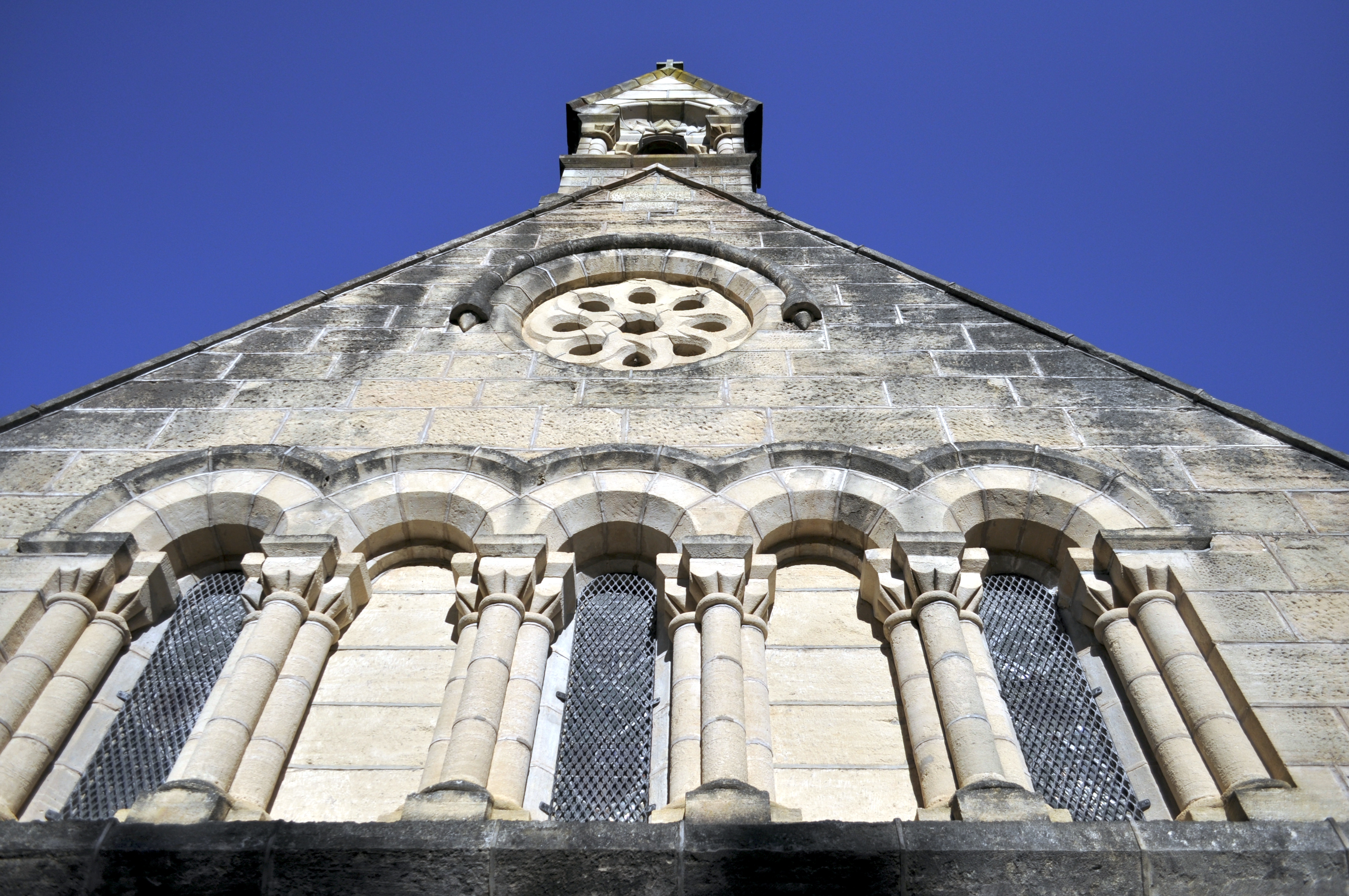

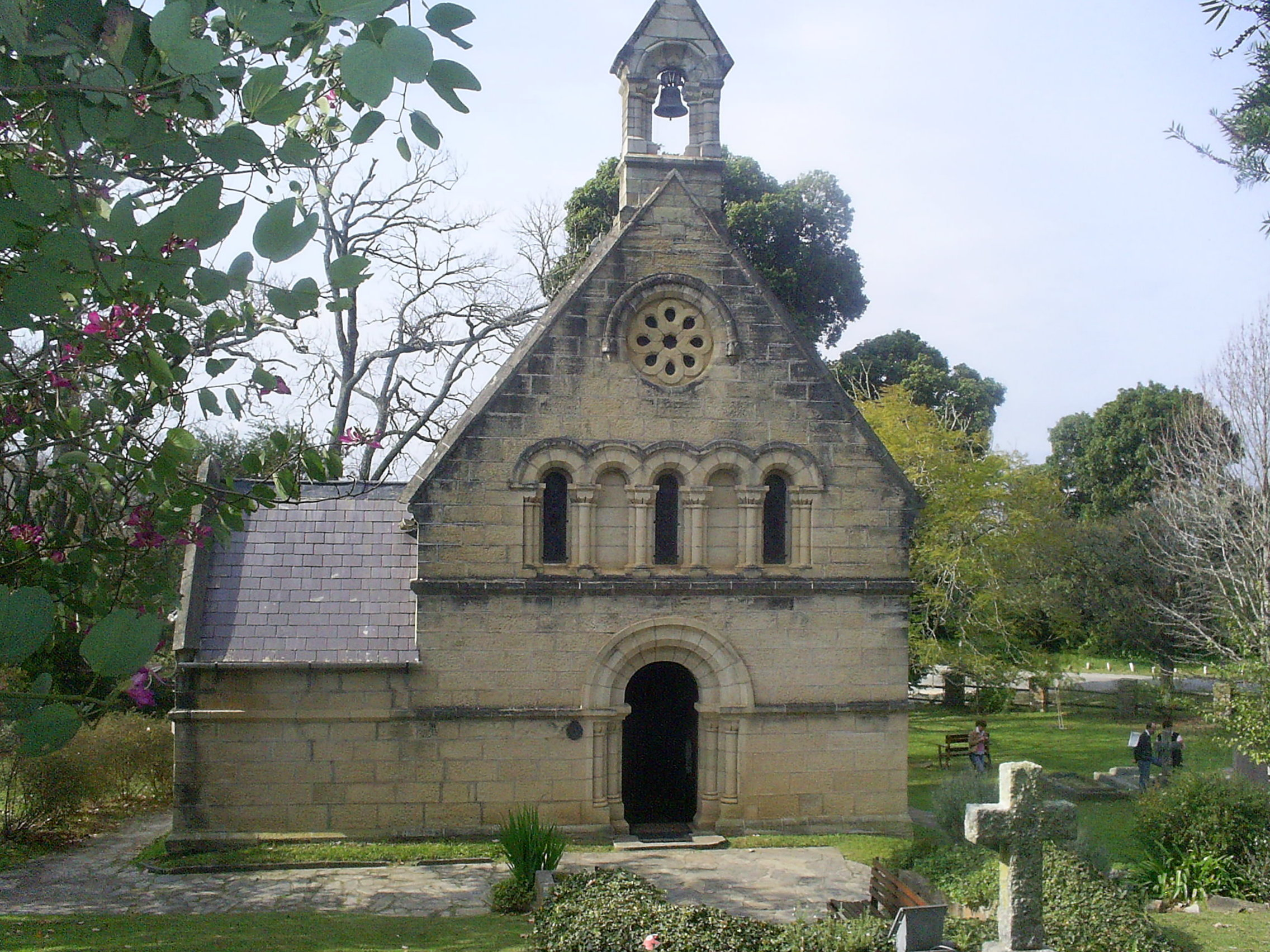
