= All Saints Church, Uniondale =

Coordinates: 33°39′22″S 23°07′42″E

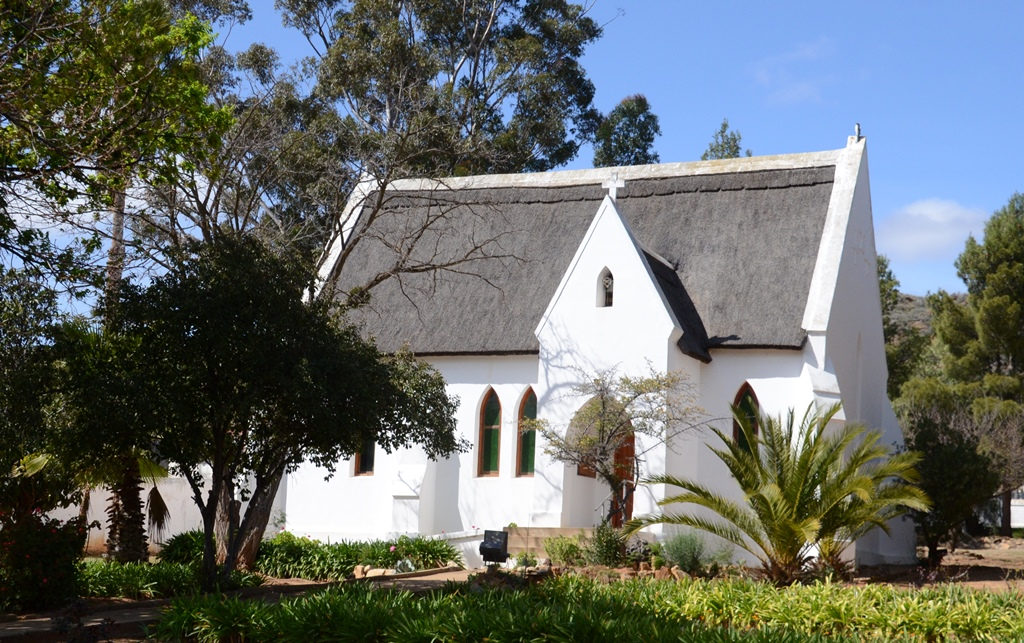
All Saints Church, Uniondale

All Saints Church, Uniondale, Western Cape, South Africa is an Anglican church designed by Sophy Gray, wife of Robert Gray, the first bishop of Cape Town. The church was built in 1869 and is located at 33 Voortrekker Street, Uniondale and is a listed heritage site.

The church is typical of Gray's design: the characteristic steeply sloping roof (more than 55°), the diagonal buttresses, the three narrow lancet windows in the eastern wall and the nave is twice the width of the chancel. The thatched roof is supported on 12 scissor trusses.
