= Prince Alfred's Pass =

Mountain pass in South Africa

- Prins Alfredpas
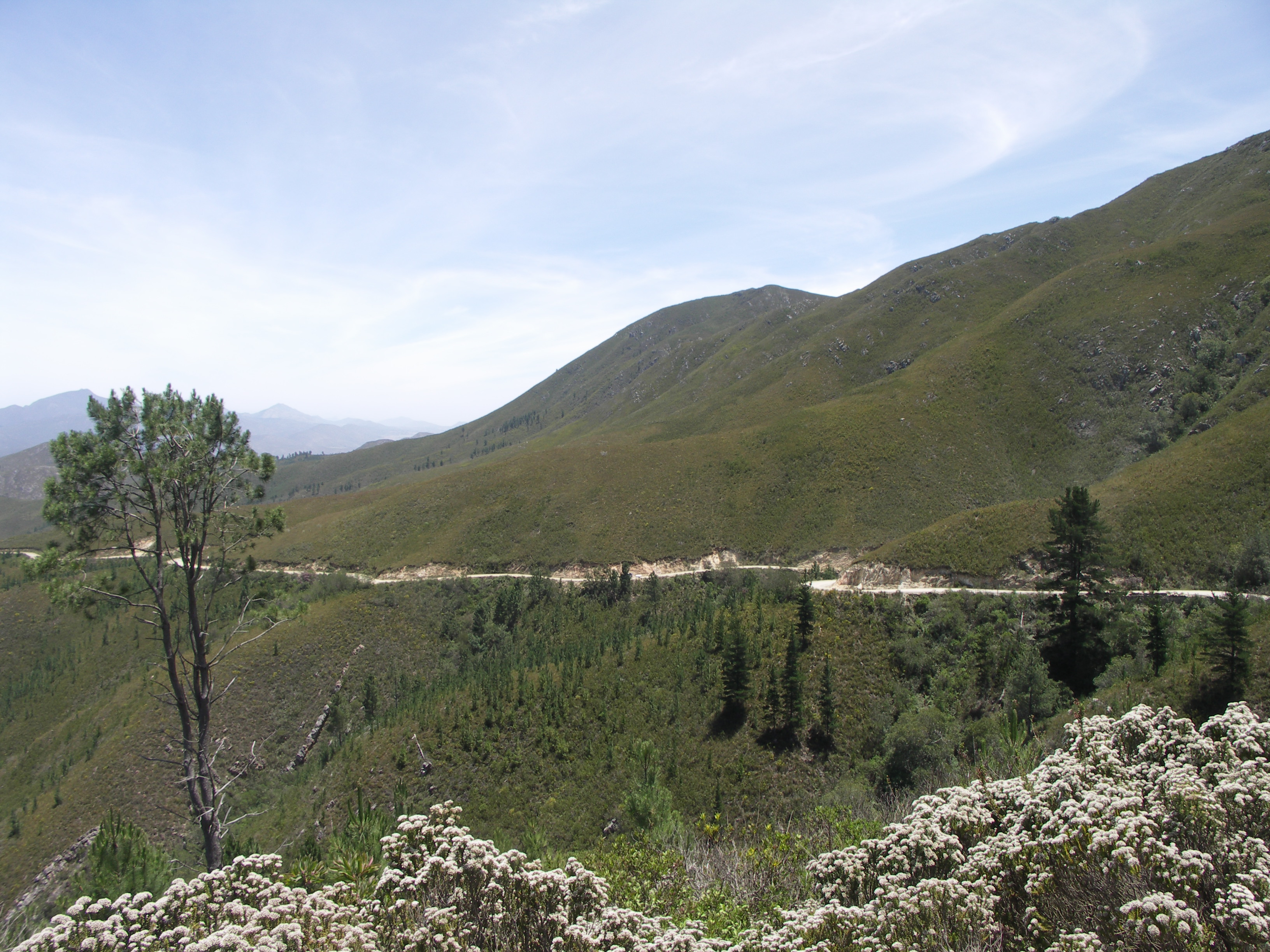
- Interactive map of Prince Alfred's Pass

Location
- Location: Uniondale and Langkloof, Western Cape
- Range: Outeniqua Mountains
- Coordinates: 33°50′0″S 23°10′0″E

Prince Alfred's Pass is reputed to be South Africa’s longest publicly accessible mountain pass (68Km). The pass is named after Queen Victoria’s fourth child, Prince Alfred, who was the first member of the British Royal family to visit South Africa in 1860. The pass connected the Klein Karoo interior and towns like Uniondale and the extended valley of Langkloof, with the coastal town of Knysna. The pass was constructed by Bain and 270 convict labourer’s between 1861 and 1867. This road is considered one of Thomas Bain’s greatest engineering achievements and can be found on route R399.

== De Vlugt ==
De Vlugt is the hamlet on the pass, that Thomas Bain and his family stayed in while he supervised construction. The village originated as a construction camp for the 270 convicts who built the pass. Today, a small community lets the cottage that he built in 1862, has converted a shop, built in 1860, then converted to doctors rooms and now is self-catering accommodation. Just outside the village are another set of notable tracks, those of English naturalist William Burchell, who collected 63 000 specimens in his custom built wagon, when he visited the country, in 1811.

== Cycle Route ==
The pass is the central feature of a 100km solo mountain bike race, which starts in Uniondale and ends in Knysna.
