= Toringkerk =

Church in Paarl, South Africa

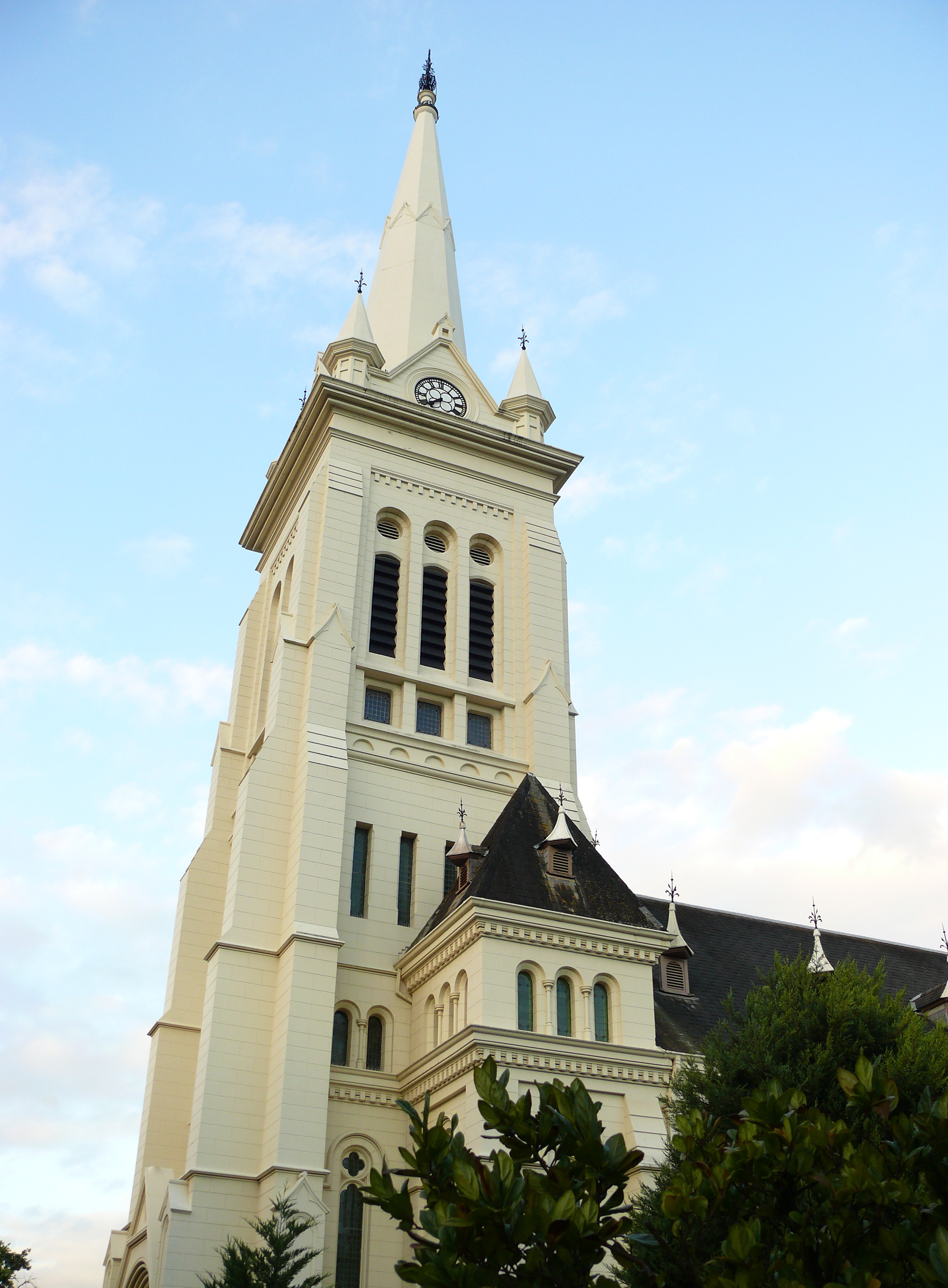
- Toringkerk
- 33°43′58″S 18°57′48″E
- Location: Paarl
- Country: South Africa
- Denomination: Nederduits Gereformeerde Kerk

History
- Founded: 1875

Architecture
- Functional status: Church

The Toringkerk in the Paarl was separated in 1875 as the NG congregation Noorder-Paarl from the NG congregation Paarl, also known as the Strooidakkerk.

Like many other congregations, this congregation also owed its origin to mutual struggle and division. In addition to the longing for better spiritual cultivation in a town that was already growing too large for just one NG congregation, the deeper-lying cause of division in the Paarl was the awakening of a national consciousness among the Afrikaners in the second half of the 19th century.

From the struggle for the maintenance of the Paarl Gymnasium, the famous free church school for Christian and mother tongue education, founded in 1858 by Rev. G.W.A. van der Lingen, was established. What was described at the time as a "small island in the sea of anglicization in the country", the municipality of Noorder-Paarl was founded. The congregation was a strong supporter of the school from the outset and even accepted financial responsibility for the Paarl Gymnasium for the first 11 years of its existence.

Because the members of the congregation consisted of people who cherished the above-mentioned ideals for church and people and lived scattered all over Paarl, it is understandable why Dr. Andrew Murray and his fellow members of the ring commission at the time requested the church council of the Paarl to have the congregation separated without boundary lines. The church council agreed not to put any obstacles in the way of secession; otherwise, there would certainly have been a split in the local church for the sake of the ideals of the Afrikaans language.

On 26 July 1875, Noorder-Paarl was separated without borderlines and with 377 members. A few weeks later, the Society of Real Afrikaners was founded in the congregation to work for the recognition of Afrikaans as a written language and for the translation of the Bible into Afrikaans. All but two of the original leaders of the G.R.A. are members of the congregation.

The Tower Church, a tower that is 57 m (187 ft), was only completed in 1907 and declared a national monument in 1982.

The membership was over 1,800 in 1990, but 1,300 in 2007, due to changed settlement patterns in the town. By 2014, it had dropped further to 1,181.

== Ministers ==
- Stephanus Jacobus du Toit, 28 September 1875–1881
- Andreas Adriaan Louw, 1882–1897 (emeritus; died on 24 June 1908)
- W.A. Joubert, 1897–1917 (emeritus; died 25 January 1932)
- Barend Bartholomeus Keet, 1914–1916 (assistant preacher)
- Michiel Johannes van der Westhuizen, 1917–1938 (later editor of Die Kerkbode)
- Petrus Johannes Loots, 1939–1953
- Hendrik Johan Christoffel van Wyk, 1956–1962 (after which first pastor of daughter congregation Drakenstein)
- Jacob Andries Cornelius Weideman, 1958–1962
- George Fredrik Kellerman Carstens, 1962–1965
- Edward George Daniel Coetzee, 1962–1973
- Eduan Johan Hay, 1963–1965
- Guiseppe Jacobus Vergottini Vlotman, 1966 to December 1970
- Christoph Wilhelm Alheit, 1973–1980
- Dr. Marthinus Beyers (Matie) Brink, 1973–2005
- Barend Johannes Jordaan, 23 January 1981 – 19 May 1991, 15 September 1991–present
- Jana Visagie, 1 September 2014 – present
- Ryno Els, 1 September 2015 – present
