= Algoa Bay =

Maritime bay in the Eastern Cape of South Africa

- Algoabaai (Afrikaans)
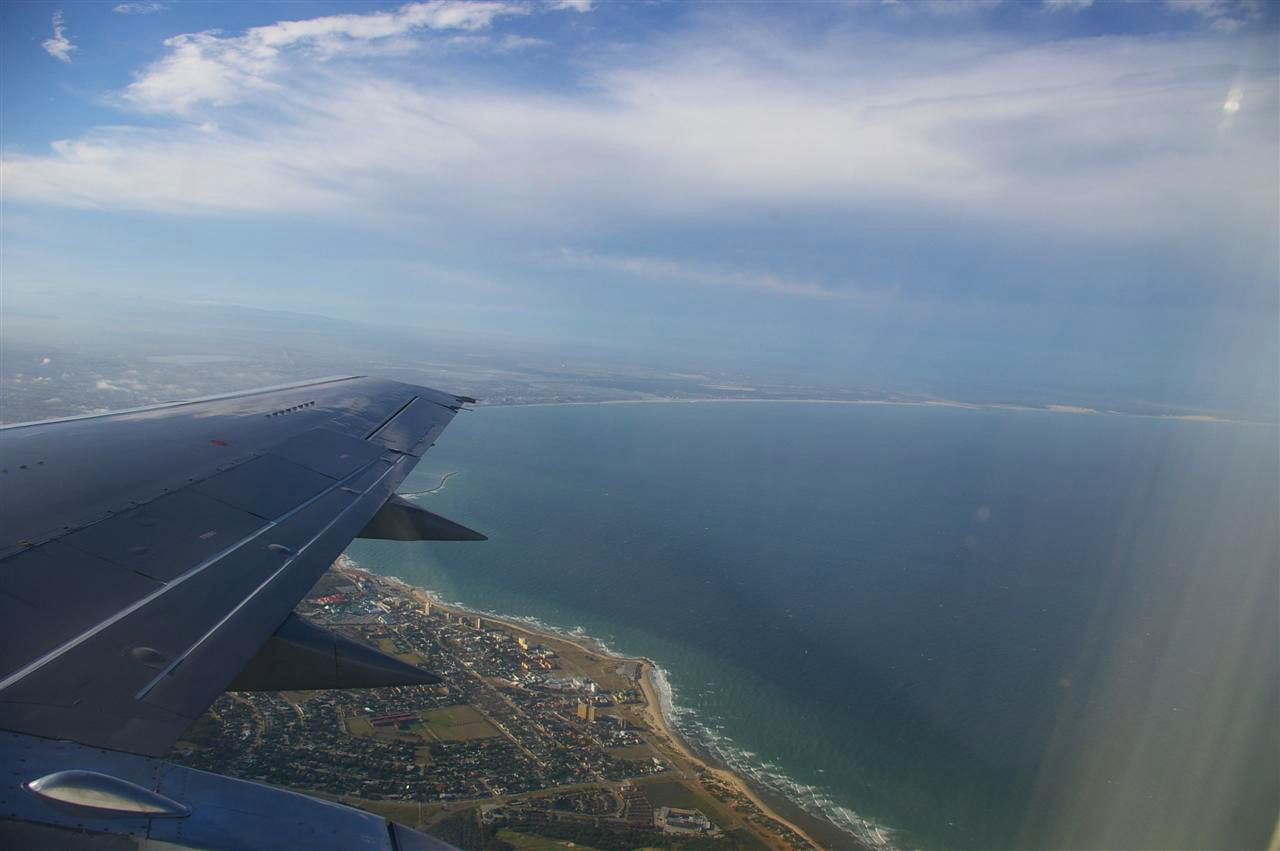
- Algoa Bay with Gqeberha (formerly named Port Elizabeth) in the foreground

- Location in South Africa
- Coordinates: 33°50′S 25°50′E
- Ocean/sea sources: Southern Indian Ocean
- Basin countries: South Africa
- Islands: St Croix Islands, Bird Islands
- Settlements: Gqeberha, Coega, Bluewater Bay

Algoa Bay is a maritime bay in the Eastern Cape, South Africa. It is located on the east coast, 683 kilometres (424 mi) east of the Cape of Good Hope.

Algoa Bay is bounded in the west by Cape Recife and in the east by Cape Padrone. The bay is up to 436 m (1,430 ft) deep. The harbour city of Gqeberha is situated adjacent to the bay, as is the Port of Ngqura deep-water port facility.

== History ==
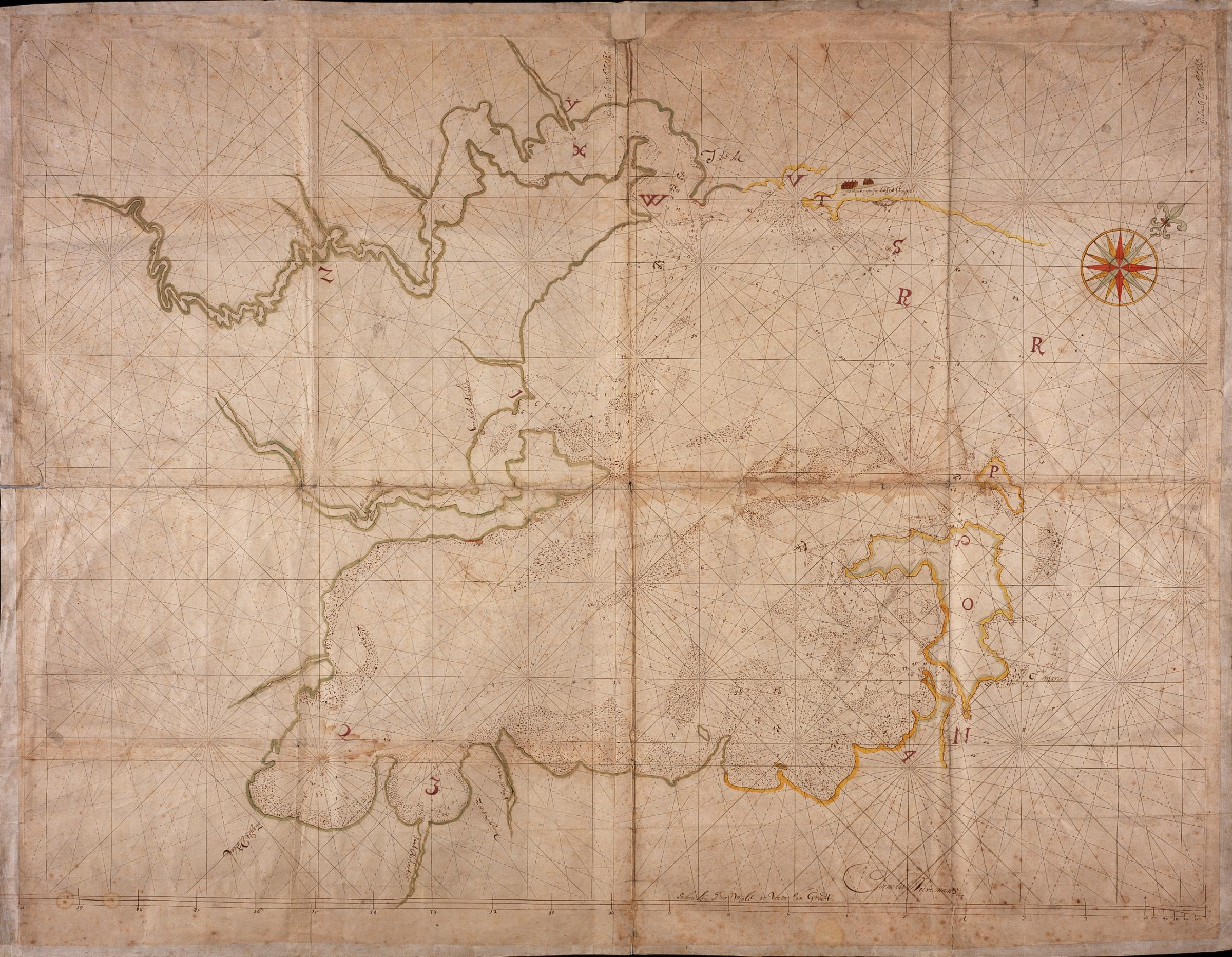
Late 17th century map of Algoa Bay.

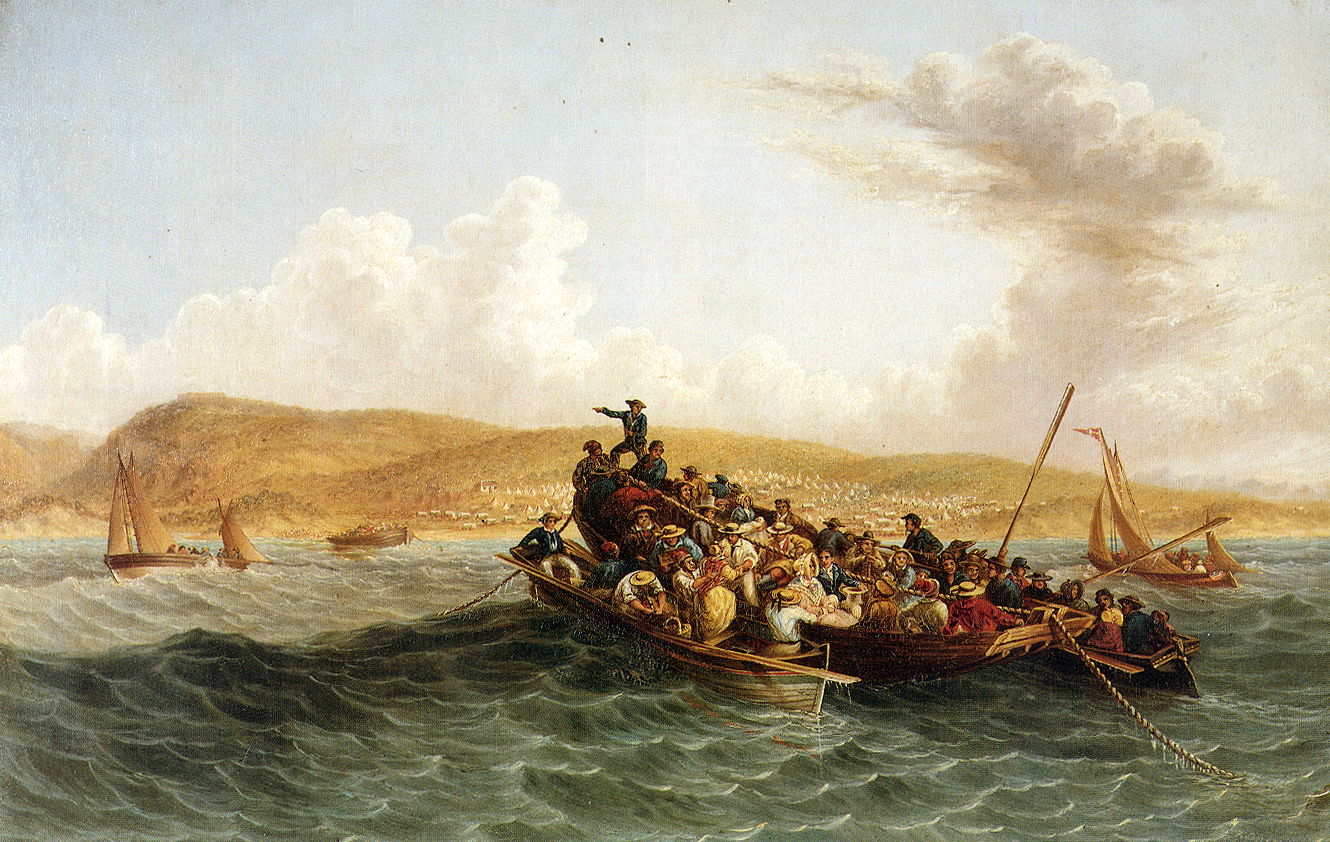
1853 painting by Thomas Baines depicting British settlers landing in Algoa Bay in 1820

The Portuguese explorer Bartolomeu Dias was the first European to reach Algoa Bay in 1488, where he planted a wooden cross on a small island now called St Croix or Santa Cruz island. He gave the bay a name meaning "Bay of the Rock", which was changed in Portugal to Bahia de Lagoa or Bay of the Lagoon, and which eventually became Algoa Bay.

Algoa Bay became prominent for three reasons. Firstly, it was the point at which Bartolomeu Dias realized that he had opened the maritime route to the East for global trade, thereby enabling Portugal to become the world's first global maritime superpower. Secondly, the mountain ranges around Algoa Bay, became a navigational landmark for rounding the treacherous Agulhas Bank on the route to the East, thereby depicting the midway point on the route to Goa, India (agoa means to Goa). Thirdly, Algoa Bay became known as a landing place for potable water.

Joshua Slocum talks about Algoa Bay in his book 'Sailing Alone Around the World' (this is not an historical account):

The early Portuguese navigators, endowed with patience, were more than sixty-nine years struggling to round this cape before they got as far as Algoa Bay, and there the crew mutinied. They landed on a small island, now called Santa Cruz, where they devoutly set up the cross, and swore they would cut the captain's throat if he attempted to sail farther. Beyond this they thought was the edge of the world, which they too believed was flat; and fearing that their ship would sail over the brink of it, they compelled Captain Dias, their commander, to retrace his course, all being only too glad to get home. A year later, we are told, Vasco da Gama sailed successfully round the "Cape of Storms," as the Cape of Good Hope was then called, and discovered Natal on Christmas or Natal day; hence the name. From this point the way to India was easy with the help of Arab and Indian fishermen.

Nautical charts of the bay caution mariners that "projectiles and badly corroded mustard gas containers have been found in the area between Cape St Francis and Bird Island out to depths of 400 m (1,300 ft). Trawlers should exercise the greatest caution."

The chemical weapons were dumped in the bay in the aftermath of World War II. During that conflict, Port Elizabeth was used as a research, manufacturing and storage site for mustard gas ordered by the British Air Ministry.

== Geography ==
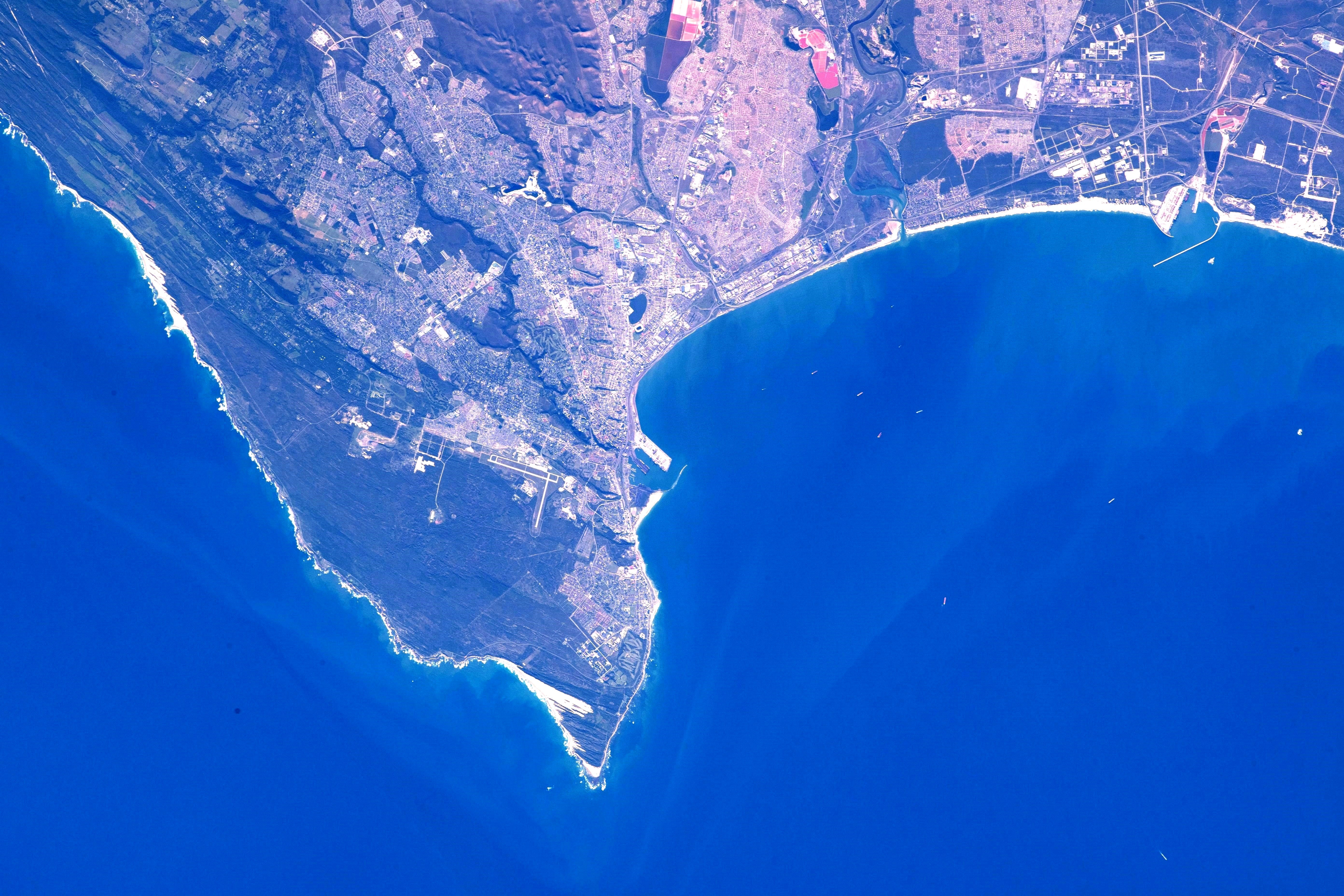
Gqeberha and vicinity on May 17, 2022, taken from the International Space Station

=== Nelson Mandela Bay ===
The metropolitan municipality of Nelson Mandela Bay, which includes Gqeberha, Bluewater Bay, St Georges Strand and Coega, is located on the western shore of Algoa Bay.

=== Islands ===
The bay contains six named islands in two groups of three that according to BirdLife International “are of considerable importance as they are the only islands along a 1,777 km (1,104 mi) stretch of coastline between Cape Agulhas and Inhaca Island in Mozambique." The combined surface area of these islands is said to be 40 ha (99 acres).

Close inshore, near the new Ngquru harbour development at Coega, on the north-eastern outskirts of Gqeberha, is the St Croix group, consisting of a main island of that name and two lesser islets, Jahleel Island just off the Ngqurha breakwater and Brenton Island on the seaward side. The second group consists of Bird, Seal and Stag Islands. All six islands and their adjacent waters are declared nature reserves and form part of the Addo Elephant National Park. The islands are closed to the public.

Worthy of mention as an obstacle to navigation is Despatch Rock, 2.4 km (1 1/2 mi) due east of the Gqeberha suburb of Summerstrand. The rock, which is submerged at high tide, is marked with a light. Further south, about 1 km (5/8 mi) southwest of Cape Recife, the western starting point of the bay is Thunderbolt Reef. Though not in the bay, this hazard to navigation has claimed many ships carelessly entering or leaving. Thunderbolt Reef is submerged save for spring low tides and the surf crashing on it can be observed from the mainland.

==== St. Croix group ====
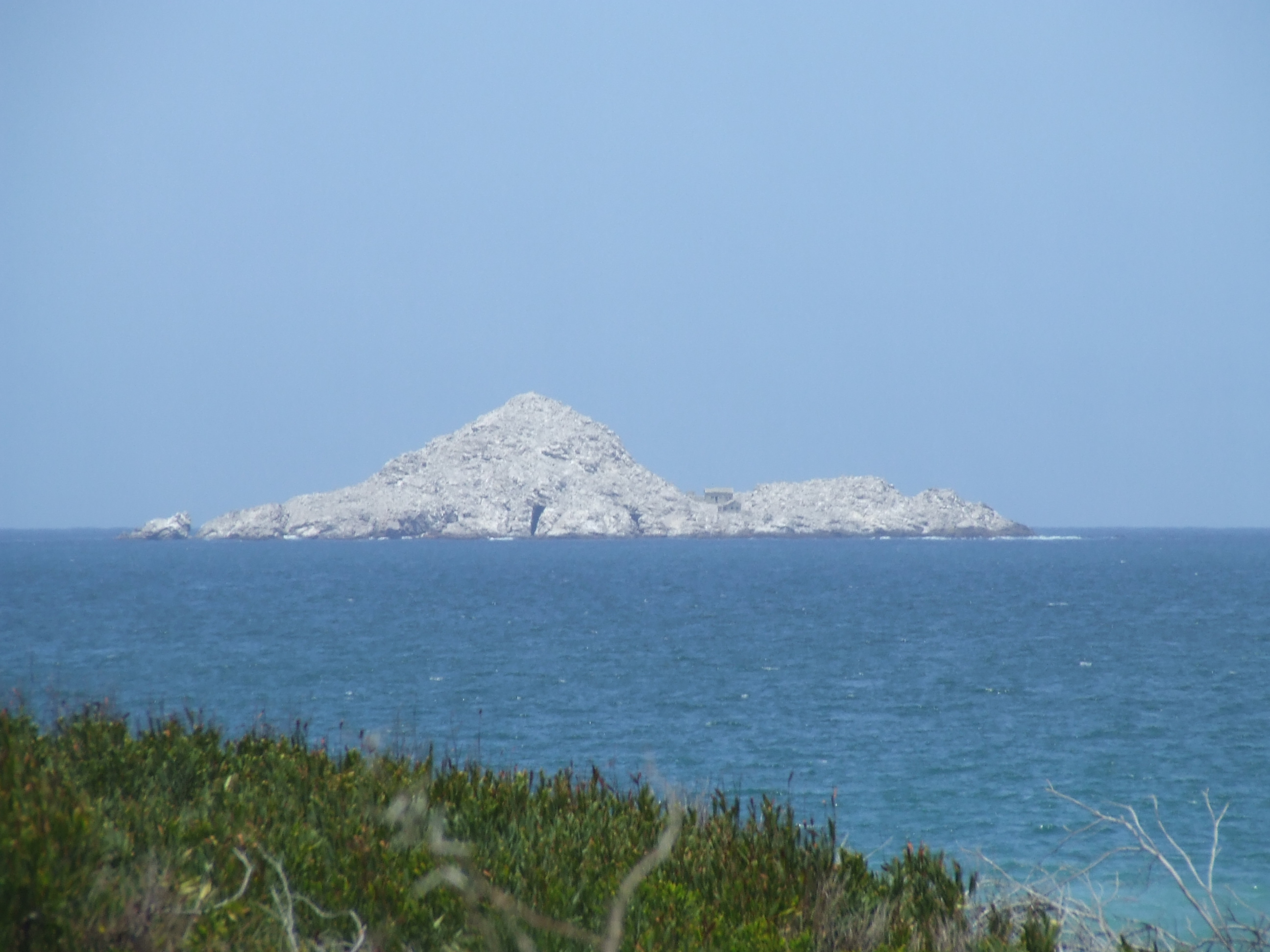
St. Croix Island seen from the nearest landfall at Hougham Park, just east of the Coega harbour development. From here the island is about 4 km to sea. Two disused stone bungalows, used by guano collectors and then by the University of Port Elizabeth for research purposes are visible.

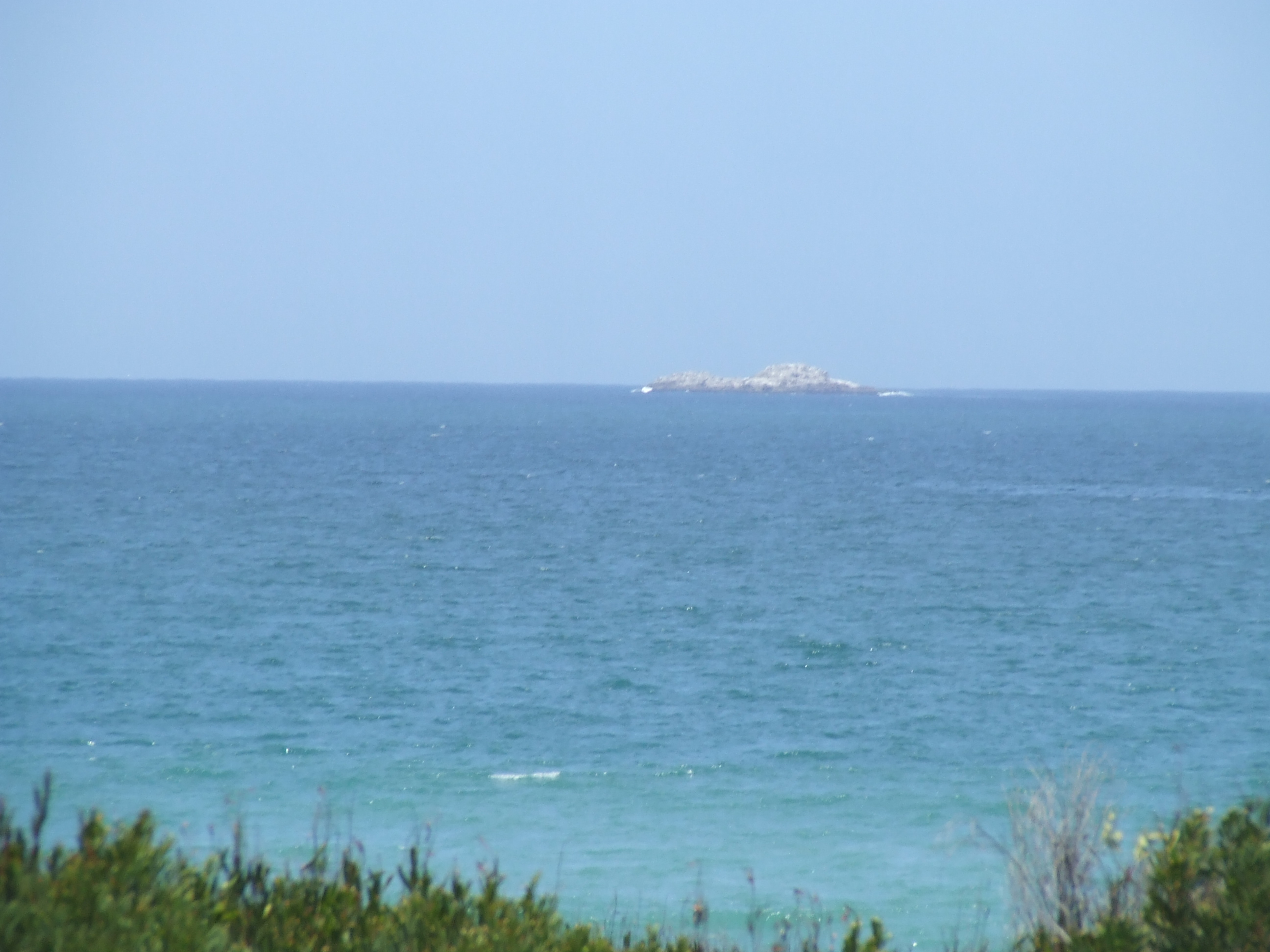
Brenton Island seen from the same location as the previous image. The island is just less than 6 km (3 1/2 mi) offshore.

- St. Croix Island at 33°47′58″S 25°46′11″E is 3.9 km (2 3/8 mi) from the nearest land and rises to 59 m (194 ft). The BirdLife fact sheet states the 12 ha (30-acre) island is only 58 m (190 ft) above sea level. It adds that the island is rocky and “supports minimal vegetation”. The island runs 700 m (2,300 ft) along a northwest, southeast axis and is about 360 m (1,180 ft) wide at its broadest – along the west coast. Its highest point is halfway along the north coast.
- Brenton Island (33°49′3″S 25°45′54″E) is equally sparsely vegetated and is less than 20 m (66 ft) in elevation, and is roughly 250 m × 200 m (820 ft × 660 ft) in size with a northwest-southeast orientation. It is 5.75 km (3 5/8 mi) to sea from the nearest point on the mainland and 1.75 km (1.09 mi) south of St. Croix.
- Jahleel, at less than 10 m (33 ft) in height, is just over 1 km (0.62 mi) from the closest beach and less than that from Ngquru’s 2.6 km (1 5/8 mi) long eastern breakwater. Jahleel is about the same size as Brenton and has a north-south axis. It is 5.75 km (3 5/8 mi) west of St. Croix.

==== Bird Island group ====
Vasco da Gama named this group of islands Ilhéus Chãos (low or flat islands). In 1755, the East Indiaman Doddington was wrecked here while underway from Dover to India. Most of the passengers and crew perished, but a few managed to make it to the islands where they were marooned for seven months until one of their number, a carpenter, was able to make a boat for them. The survivors subsisted primarily on fish, birds and eggs until they were able to reach land. The ship was carrying a significant quantity of gold and silver, some of which was illegally salvaged in more recent times. Bird Island was named by the survivors as they left the island in their boat.

Bird Island (33°50′26″S 26°17′10″E), Seal Island and Stag Island lie in close proximity some 40 km (25 mi) east of the St Croix group or 53 km (33 mi) due east of Gqeberha and 7 km (4.3 mi) from the nearest landfall at Woody Cape – part of the Addo Elephant National Park. Bird Island has a lighthouse, erected in 1898 after a series of shipwrecks in the vicinity of the island. Doddington Rock, West rock and East Reef lie just South-West of the group of islands.

At 19 hectares (47 acres), Bird Island is the largest of the Algoa Bay islands – according to BirdLife. It is relatively flat and rises to 9 m (30 ft). Seal Island is 0.6 hectares (1.5 acres) in size and lies 360 m (1,180 ft) north of Bird Island. Stag Island is even smaller at 0.1 hectares (0.25 acres) and is 320 m (1,050 ft) north-west of Bird Island. "Much of the island group is covered by sparse growth of mixed vegetation dominated by the fleshy herb Mesembryanthemum (fig marigold/icicle plants). Tetragonia (duneweed) and Chenopodium (goosefoot) form localised thickets that provide cover for some seabirds," the fact sheet says.

== Ecology ==
=== Bird and wildlife ===
The BirdLife fact sheet adds that 14 species of seabirds, several species of shorebirds and 33 species of terrestrial birds have been recorded on the islands. Eight seabird species were known to breed on the islands in 2007. “These are the only islands off southern mainland Africa where Sterna dougallii (Roseate Tern) breeds regularly.”

The islands are also home to 43% of the global population of the African penguin (Spheniscus demersus), the majority of which are on St Croix. St Croix also holds a locally significant breeding population of Cape cormorant (Phalacrocorax capensis).

Bird Island is one of only six breeding sites in the world for the Cape gannet (Morus capensis). “Larus dominicanus (the Kelp Gull) and Haematopus moquini (the African Oystercatcher) are found throughout the Algoa Bay complex. The island group is also known to hold large numbers of Sterna vittata (Antarctic Tern), which in winter roost on the island in their thousands (regularly holding between 10% and 20% of the estimated total Afrotropical non-breeding population).” The island is also home to Cape fur seals (Arctocephalus pusillus).

Other maritime species present are humpback whales, southern right whales, Bryde's whales, bottlenose dolphins, common dolphins, humpback dolphins, African penguins, African black oystercatchers, Cape gannets, Cape fur seals, Cape cormorants, white-breasted cormorants, various shark species and various pelagic birds including terns, skuas, petrels, shearwaters and albatrosses.

=== Conservation issues ===
The St. Croix group and a 300 m (980 ft) maritime zone around each island became South Africa’s island marine reserve in 1981 and were administered as part of the then-Woody Cape Nature Reserve. Up to then, the islands had fallen under the control of the Guano Islands section of the Division of Sea Fisheries. The Eastern Cape Nature Conservation service, which subsequently became the Directorate of Nature Conservation of the Eastern Cape Province, managed the islands after April 1992 according to BirdLife. The Woody Cape reserve was subsequently incorporated into the Addo National Elephant Park, which boasts that it is home to Africa’s “big seven” – the elephant, lion, leopard, rhinoceros, buffalo and the whale and great white shark that inhabit the bay.

Conservationists are wary of the Ngqura development which in time, in addition to a deep water port will include a heavy-industry complex. Mooted occupants include an aluminium smelter and an oil refinery. They see the development as posing, according to BirdLife:

a huge threat to the seabirds of the St. Croix group. The development would result in increased pollution and shipping activity, which would affect all breeding seabirds negatively.

The NGO notes that the population of the African penguin in the bay has been increasing steadily during the last century. “There are only a few growing colonies in the world, and it is thought that these birds may be relocating here from colonies that are in decline in the Western Cape or farther afield. Certain factors are known to affect seabirds throughout their ranges. Competition with commercial fisheries, especially purse-seining for surface-shoaling fish such as anchovy (Engraulis capensis) and pilchard (Sardinops sagax), has been implicated as one of the most significant factors causing seabird population declines." The organisation has recommended that marine reserves with a radius of 25 km be created around important breeding islands, and that commercial fishing be banned or restricted in these zones.

The fact sheet continues: An unpredictable threat, which is difficult to control, is chronic pollution by crude oil or other pollutants which spill into the ocean when tankers break open, wash their tanks, dump cargo or pump bilge. The African Penguin (Spheniscus demersus) is particularly susceptible to these events, and a single oil disaster has the ability to severely affect populations. It is believed that the breeding sites in Algoa Bay, at the eastern extremity of the species' range, are at highest risk as they are closest to the major oil-shipping routes.

== See also ==
- Kwaaihoek – Part of the Addo Elephant National Park, South Africa
- Donkin Heritage Trail – Pedestrian route in Port Elizabeth, South Africa
