= Regional routes (South Africa) =

Highway type in South Africa

Regional routes (also sometimes known as minor regional routes) are the third category of road in the South African route numbering scheme. They are designated with the letter "R" followed by a three-digit number. They serve as feeders connecting smaller towns to the national and provincial routes. Designation as a regional road does not necessarily imply any particular size of road; they range from gravel roads (like the R340 between Plettenberg Bay and Uniondale) to multi-lane freeways (like the R300 near Cape Town).

Although most regional roads are maintained by provincial road authorities, this is not universally the case; in provinces which lack capacity, some may be under the control of the National Roads Agency (SANRAL), and in urban areas they may be ordinary streets under the control of the municipal roads department. Similarly, some national (N) roads and freeways are under the control of provincial or municipal authorities rather than SANRAL.

== Images of regional roads ==
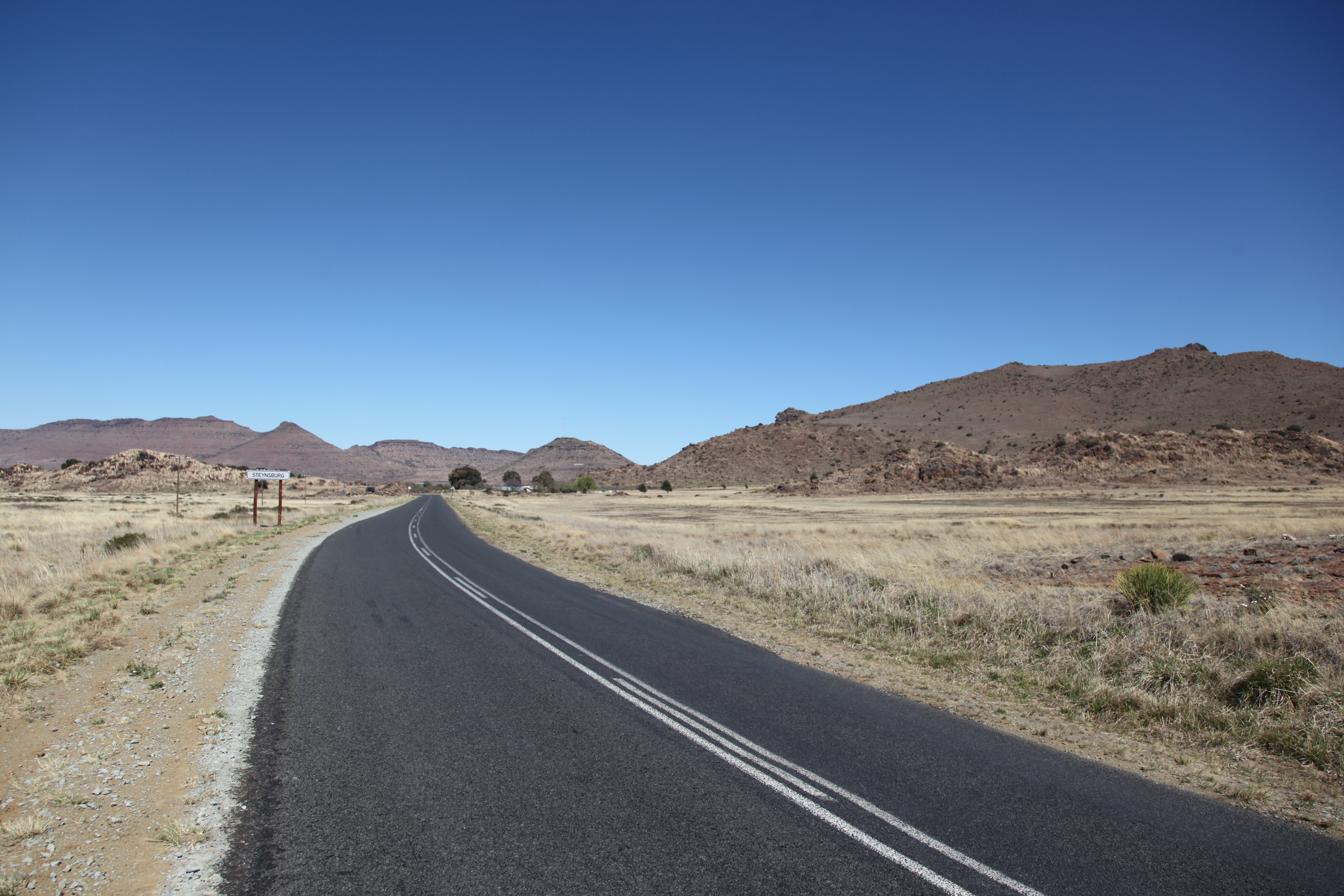
The R390 near Steynsburg

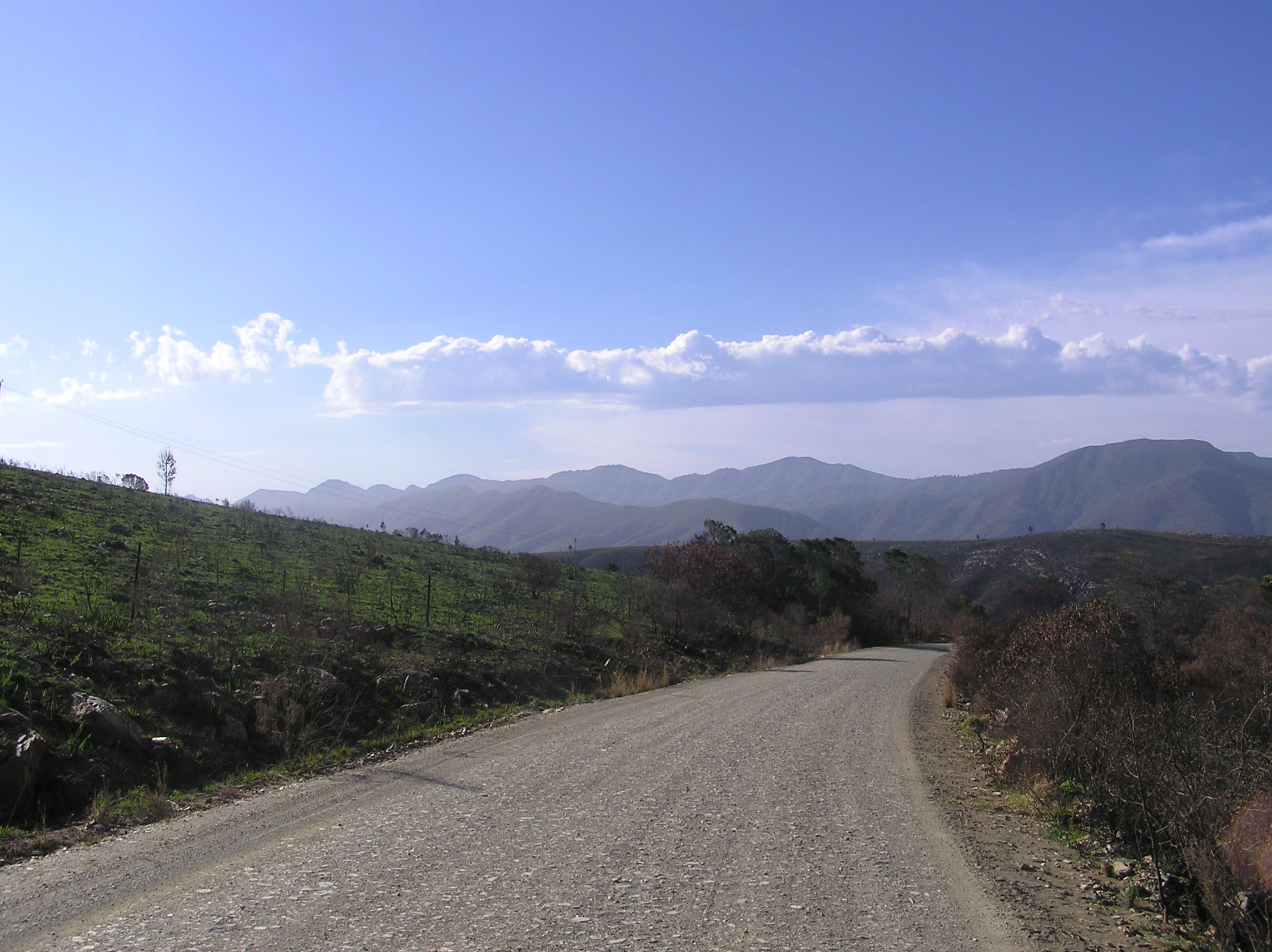
The R340 between Plettenberg Bay and Uniondale

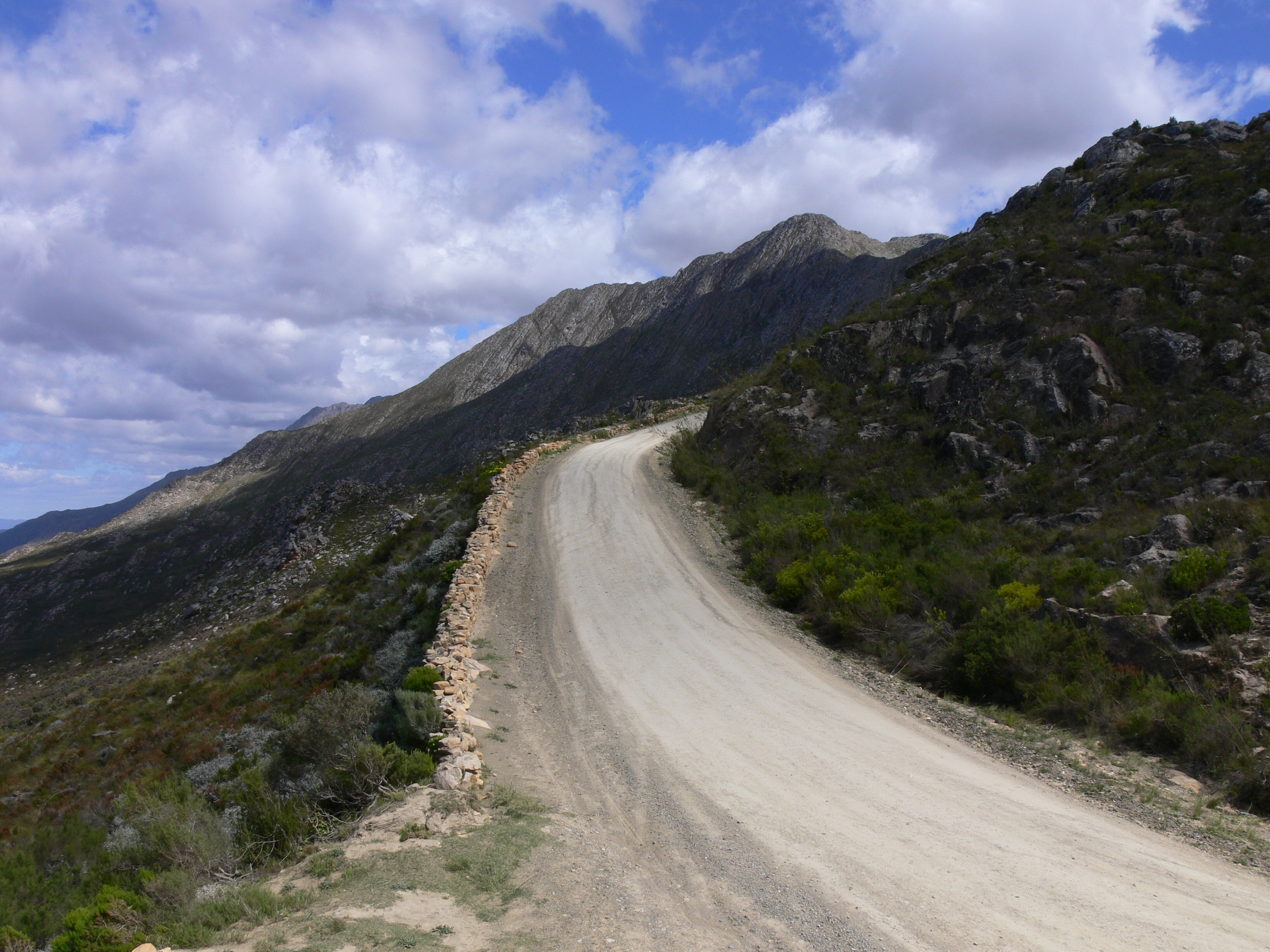
Swartberg pass on the R328 near Oudtshoorn

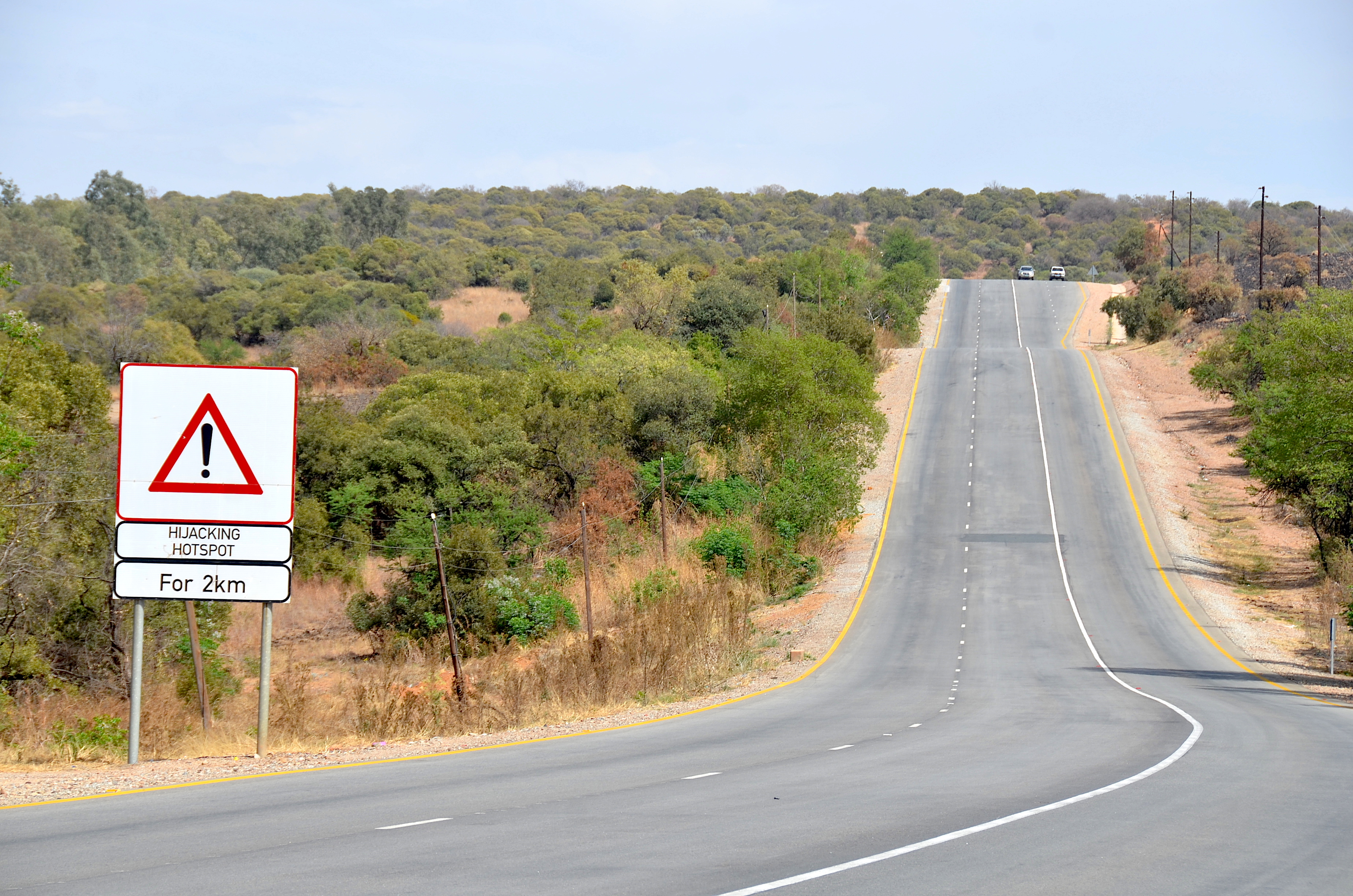
Hijacking Hotspot, R511 in Gauteng

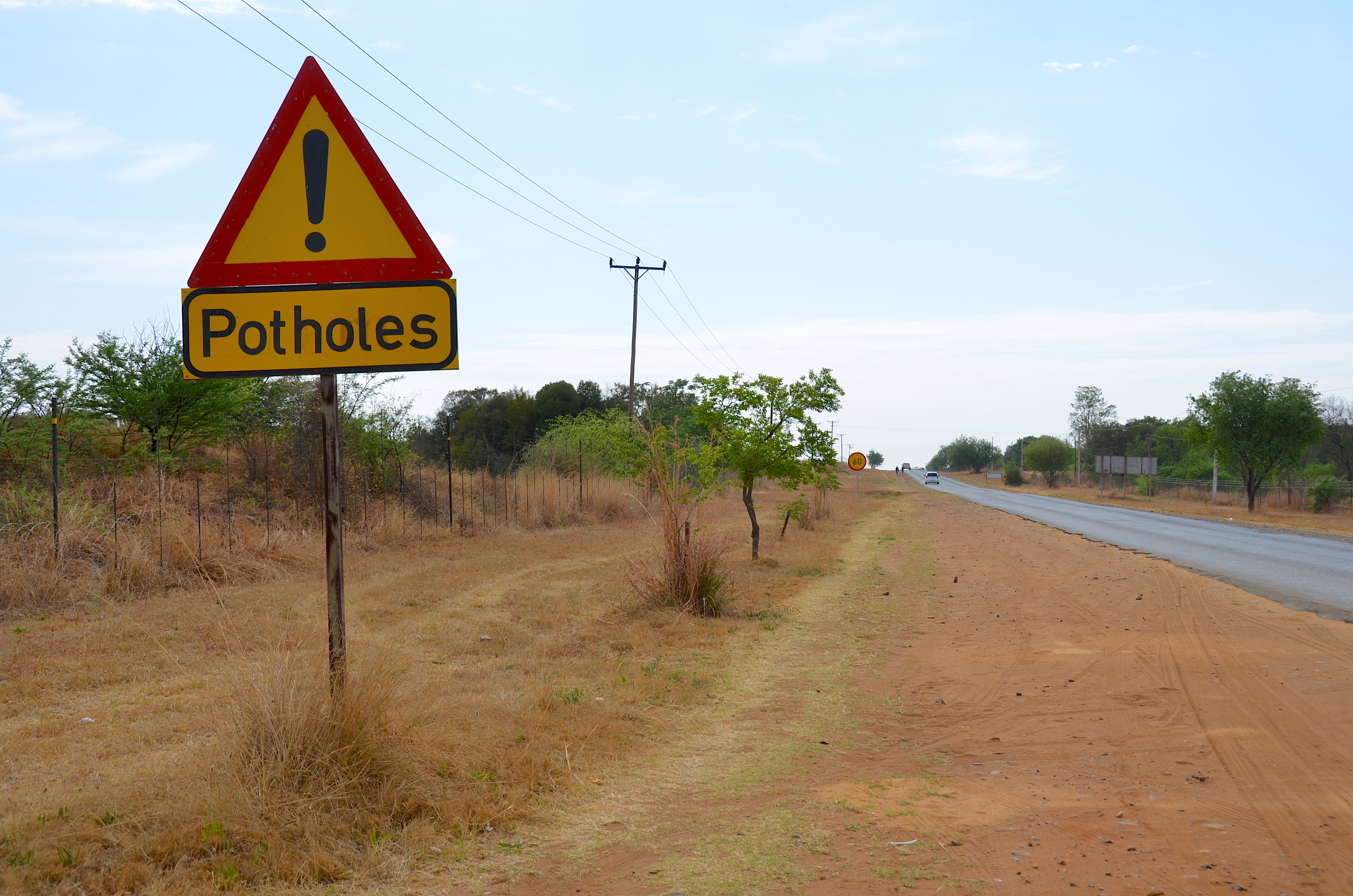
Pothole warning sign, R512 in North West Province

== See also ==
- National routes (South Africa)
- Provincial routes (South Africa)
