= Uniondale, South Africa =

Uniondale
- Town
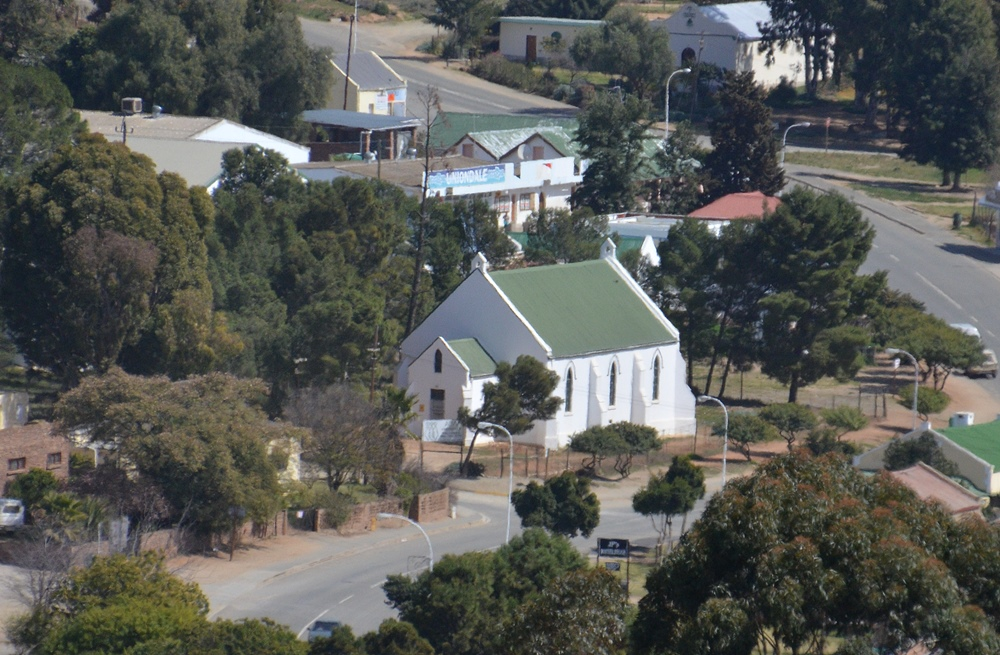
- Uniondale, Old Dutch Reformed Church from the fort

- Location within Western Cape Location within South Africa
- Coordinates: 33°39′33″S 23°7′26″E
- Country: South Africa
- Province: Western Cape
- District: Garden Route
- Municipality: George
- Established: 1856

Government
  - Type: Municipal council
  - Body: George Municipal Council (Ward 25)
  - Councillor: Jarques Esau (ANC)

Area
  - Total: 18.90 km^{2} (7.30 sq mi)

Population (2011)
  - Total: 4,525
  - Density: 239.4/km^{2} (620.1/sq mi)

Racial makeup (2011)
  - Black African: 8.5%
  - Coloured: 80.9%
  - Indian/Asian: 0.2%
  - White: 8.9%
  - Other: 1.5%

First languages (2011)
  - Afrikaans: 95.1%
  - English: 1.9%
  - Xhosa: 1.1%
  - Other: 1.9%
- Time zone: UTC+2 (SAST)
- Postal code (street): 6460
- PO box: 6460
- Area code: 044

Uniondale is a small town in the Little Karoo in the Western Cape Province, South Africa. Its primary claim to fame is the ghost story of the Uniondale hitcher. The town is connected by the N9 road to George and the R339 road, down to Knysna.

== History ==
Uniondale was founded in 1856 through the amalgamation of two rural settlements, Hopedale and Lyon. During the late nineteenth century the town became known for wagon building and the ostrich feather trade.

=== Anglo-Boer War ===
During the Anglo-Boer War (1899 - 1902), Uniondale, initially believed itself far removed from hostilities. Both local residents and British authorities underestimated the threat posed by Boer commandos entering the Cape Colony. Dr. R. Morrow, a locum District Surgeon in Uniondale during early 1901, noted that even by December 1900, he had been assured the Boers would not reach the area.

Uniondale faced its first direct threat following the attack on nearby Willowmore by Commandant Gideon Scheepers on 19 January 1901. The Willowmore Town Guard resisted successfully, prompting Scheepers to move rapidly toward Uniondale. The town was largely unprepared. Many residents fled during the night of 19-20 January, while those who stayed awaited the outcome.

Scheepers’ commando of about 50 men entered Uniondale around midday on 20 January 1901. They seized the courthouse, jail, and all usable horses. Dr. Morrow encountered Scheepers and his adjutant, Judge Henry Hugo, at the local hotel, where he was pressured to share a drink with them. The Boers released white prisoners but detained the magistrate, jailer, and English Church minister. The commando departed the next morning after receiving urgent orders, as British forces fired from nearby hills.

Following the incursion, a British Mounted Infantry under Lt-Col W. H. Williams arrived on 21 January, freeing the prisoners and forming a Town Guard. Small forts, were constructed shortly afterward, likely in late January 1901, to defend the town. These forts successfully repelled further Boer attacks, discouraging Scheepers from attacking Uniondale again.

The Town Guard eventually numbered 141 men, including 46 white and 95 coloured soldiers, led by Captain B. W. Edmeades and Lieutenant C. C. Markotter. Other nearby engagements occurred later in 1901, including clashes near Willowmore and the Thomas Bain Pass, but Uniondale remained largely secure due to its forts.

==== Uniondale Forts ====
At least four forts were constructed around Uniondale, designed as small defensive positions with circular or oval plans, covered entrances with screen walls, vertical interior walls, sloped exterior walls, and widely splayed loopholes. Local stone and mud-based mortar were used in construction.

- Fort 1: Largest fort, 6.2-6.7 m diameter internally, entrance 3.5 m long, elevation 860 m. Heavily restored in 1976. Served as a key lookout post.
- Fort 2: Smallest fort, 3-3.5 m internally, elevation 858 m. Walls largely demolished. Guarded Uniondale Poort.
- Fort 3: Built from shale slabs, 4-4.2 m internally, elevation 819 m. Upper walls and loopholes mostly lost.
- Fort 4: Best-preserved, 4.6-5 m internally, elevation 862 m. Walls up to 2.8 m high externally, with several intact loopholes.

Additional forts may have existed, but their exact locations remain uncertain.

Location of preserved Anglo Boer War forts.

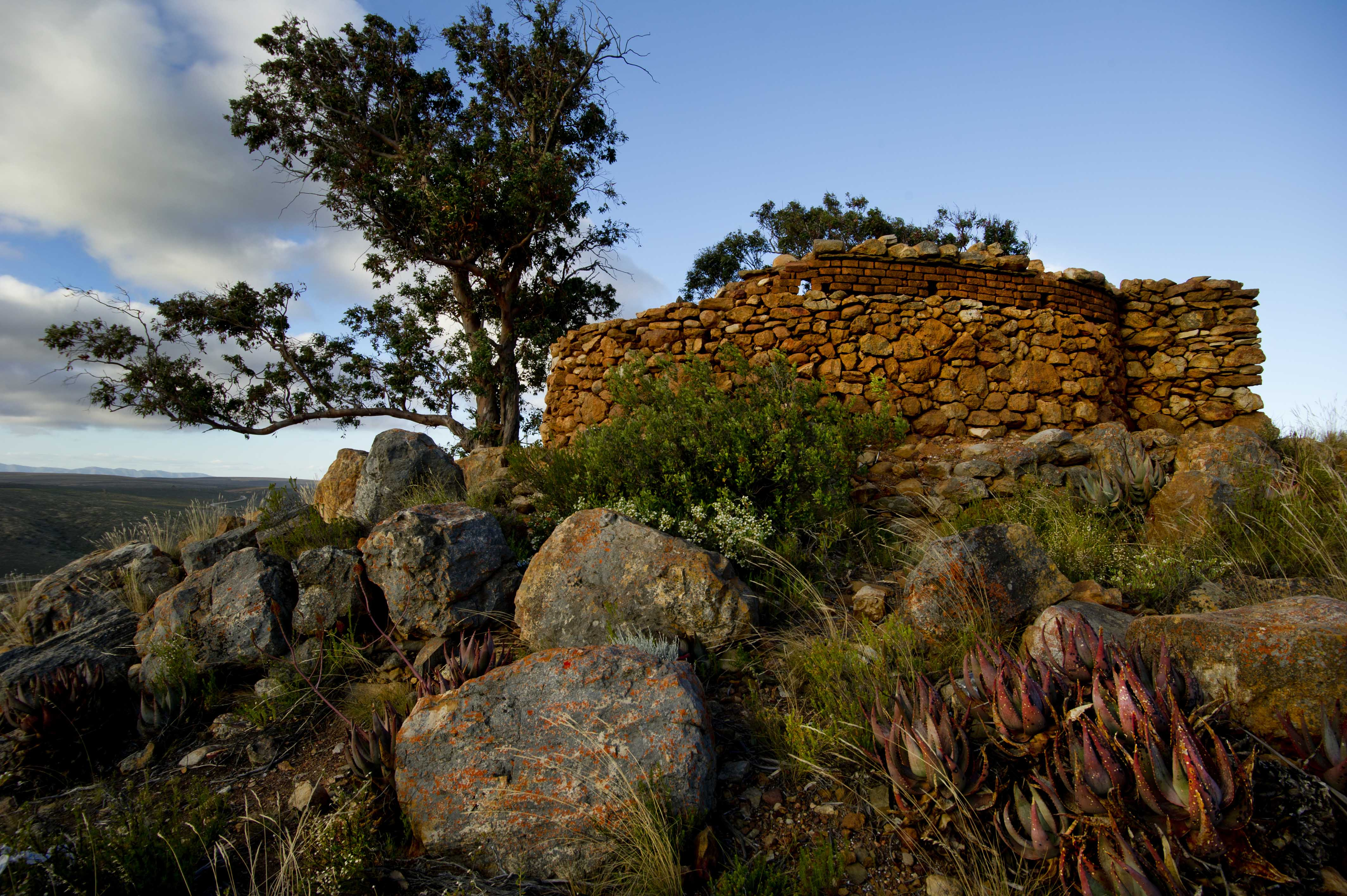
A block house built during the Anglo-Boer War by the British military authorities and the local militia for the defence of Uniondale.

== Architectural and Religious Heritage ==
Uniondale retains a large number of historic structures due to limited modern redevelopment. Several buildings in the town have been declared National Monuments.

Notable sites include the Uniondale Watermill built in 1854 by James Stewart, which housed the largest water wheel in South Africa. The All Saints Anglican Church dates from 1876 and was designed by Sophia Gray, regarded as the country’s first female ecclesiastical architect. The Dutch Reformed Church, erected in 1886, became known for its heavy bells which caused the original tower to crack in 1896, leading to reconstruction in 1908.

The Jewish Synagogue completed in 1905 contains distinctive murals and is maintained by the local Lions Club. The town also features nagmaal huisies, small communion houses built for visiting farmers and characterised by raised stoeps that allowed direct access from horse drawn vehicles.

== Ghost story ==
In stormy weather on Easter weekend of 1968 a young engaged couple had a car accident on the Barandas-Willowmore road around 20 kilometres from the town. The woman, Maria Charlotte Roux, was sleeping in the back seat of their Volkswagen Beetle when her fiancé lost control of the car. The car overturned and she was killed.

The first reported sighting of a ghost matching her description occurred during the Easter weekend of 1976, and since then many other sightings have been reported. All involve a female hitchhiker who is given a lift, then disappears a few kilometres down the road, and some have reported car doors opening and closing, laughter and a chill in the air.

This story has many of the basic characteristics of the well-known Vanishing Hitchhiker urban legend, which was described thus by Ernest W. Baughman:

Ghost of young woman asks for ride in automobile, disappears from closed car without the driver's knowledge, after giving him an address to which she wishes to be taken. The driver asks person at the address about the rider, finds she has been dead for some time. (Often the driver finds that the ghost has made similar attempts to return, usually on the anniversary of death in automobile accident. Often, too, the ghost leaves some item such as a scarf or traveling bag in the car.)[]

== Notable residents ==
Dalene Matthee, author of Fiela se Kind, lived in Uniondale from 1971 – 1978, when her husband was the bank manager. A few of the film locations for Fiela se kind, were also in the town.

== See also ==
- All Saints Church
- Dutch Reformed Church
