= List of heritage sites in George and Mossel Bay =

This is a list of the heritage sites in George and Mossel Bay, situated in the Garden Route District Municipality (Western Cape), as recognized by the South African Heritage Resources Agency.

SAHRA identifier	Site name	Description	Town	District	NHRA status	Coordinates	Image
9/2/022/0039	GRAAFWATER LOCAL AREA GENERAL		Graafwater	George			Upload Photo
9/2/030/0001	Farmhouse, Eensaamheid, Langkloof, Noll, George District		George	George			Upload Photo
9/2/030/0002	GEORGE MUNICIPAL AREA, GENERAL		George	George			Upload Photo
9/2/030/0003	The Tree of Meetings, Mission Street, Pacaltsdorp, George District		Pacaltsdorp	George			
9/2/030/0004	Old Cemetery, Kloof Street, Pacaltsdorp, George District		Pacaltsdorp	George			Upload Photo
9/2/030/0005	The Board House, Church Street, Pacaltsdorp, District		Pacaltsdorp	George			Upload Photo
9/2/030/0006	Mission School, Church Street, Pacaltsdorp, George District		Pacaltsdorp	George			Upload Photo
9/2/030/0007	Church and church buildings, Pacaltsdorp	The church building in Pacaltsdorp was consecrated in 1825 and is one of the most impressive of the remaining examples of the early Gothic revival in South Africa. Near the church stands the original parsonage which was erected in 1835, the present parson Type of site: Church	Pacaltsdorp	George	Provincial Heritage Site	34°00′56″S 22°27′21″E	The church building in Pacaltsdorp was consecrated in 1825 and is one of the most impressive of the remaining examples of the early Gothic revival in South Africa. Near the church stands the original parsonage which was erected in 1835, the present parson Type of site: Church
9/2/030/0007/02	Rev Pacalt’s Cottage, Mission Street, Pacaltsdorp, George District		Pacaltsdorp	George			Upload Photo
9/2/030/0007/03	Old London Mission Society Church, Mission Street, Pacaltsdorp, George District		Pacaltsdorp	George			Upload Photo
9/2/030/0007/1	Old Parsonage, Mission Street, Pacaltsdorp, George District		Pacaltsdorp	George			
9/2/030/0008	Old Baptist Church, Meade Street, George		George	George			Upload Photo
9/2/030/0009	Montagu Pass, George District	The Montagu Pass near George, which replaced the older Cradock Pass, was built after 1843 by the engineer Henry Francourt White at a cost of R71 598. The pass was named after the Colonial Secretary, John Montagu, who officially opened the pass in December; Type of site: Pass		George	Provincial Heritage Site	33°54′34″S 22°25′06″E	The Montagu Pass near George, which replaced the older Cradock Pass, was built after 1843 by the engineer Henry Francourt White at a cost of R71 598. The pass was named after the Colonial Secretary, John Montagu, who officially opened the pass in December Type of site: Pass
9/2/030/0009/002	Old Tollhouse, Montagu Pass, George District	This toll-house dates back to the middle of the 19th century and from here, at the bottom of the Montagu Pass, toll was collected after the pass had been opened for traffic in 1849. Type of site: Toll		George	Provincial Heritage Site	33°55′07″S 22°24′59″E	This toll-house dates back to the middle of the 19th century and from here, at the bottom of the Montagu Pass, toll was collected after the pass had been opened for traffic in 1849. Type of site: Toll
9/2/030/0009/003	Keur River Bridge, Montagu Pass, George District	This attractive arched stone bridge was part of the original construction of the Montagu Pass which was opened by Sir John Montagu in 1847, Type of site: Bridge; Current use: Bridge. This attractive arched stone bridge was part of the original construction of the Montagu Pass which was opened by Sir John Montagu in 1847,		George	Provincial Heritage Site	33°54′25″S 22°25′06″E	This attractive arched stone bridge was part of the original construction of the Montagu Pass which was opened by Sir John Montagu in 1847, Type of site: Bridge Current use: Bridge. This attractive arched stone bridge was part of the original construction of the Montagu Pass which was opened by Sir John Montagu in 1847,
9/2/030/0009/01	Old Hotel, Montagu Pass, George District		George	George	Pending Provincial Declaration		Upload Photo
9/2/030/0009/04	Montagu Pass Road, Montagu Pass, George Dist		George	George		33°53′41″S 22°25′13″E	
9/2/030/0010	Bamboo Lodge, York Street, George	Type of site: House Previous use: House. Current use: Demolished.	George	George	Provisional Protection	33°57′49″S 22°27′10″E	Upload Photo
9/2/030/0011	Eikenhof, Courtenay Street, George		George	George			Upload Photo
9/2/030/0012	Old Gaol, De Bult Boys High School, George	Type of site: Gaol, School Previous use: Prison. Current use: School.	George	George	Provincial Heritage Site	33°57′18″S 22°27′01″E	Type of site: Gaol, School Previous use: Prison. Current use: School.
9/2/030/0013	Silviculturist Dwelling, Beervlei Forest Reserve, George District		George	George			Upload Photo
9/2/030/0014	Silviculturist Dwelling, Groenkop Forest Reserve, Saasveld, George		George	George			Upload Photo
9/2/030/0015	Meade House, 91 Meade Street, George		George	George		33°57′45″S 22°27′28″E	Upload Photo
9/2/030/0016	Dutch Reformed Church Complex, Courtenay Street, George	Type of site: Church Current use: Church : Dutch Reformed.	George	George	Provincial Heritage Site	33°57′22″S 22°27′47″E	Type of site: Church Current use: Church : Dutch Reformed. Media related to Dutch Reformed Mother Church, George, Western Cape at Wikimedia Commons
9/2/030/0016-001	Dutch Reformed Church, Courtenay Street, George	Type of site: Church Current use: Church : Dutch Reformed.	George	George	Provincial Heritage Site	33°57′25″S 22°27′45″E	Type of site: Church Current use: Church : Dutch Reformed.
9/2/030/0016-002	Dutch Reformed Church Parsonage, Courtenay Street, George	Type of site: Church Current use: Church : Dutch Reformed.	George	George	Provincial Heritage Site	33°57′24″S 22°27′44″E	Type of site: Church Current use: Church : Dutch Reformed.
9/2/030/0017	VOC Beacon, George Museum, George	The beacon together with others was caused to be erected by Governor Van der Graaff in 1785 to show the Company’s authority and to strengthen its claim to the territory. The public library of George stands in the shadow of a giant, historical oak. Type of site: Beacon. The beacon together with others was caused to be erected by Governor Van der Graaff in 1785 to show the Company's authority and to strengthen its claim to the territory.	George	George	Heritage Object	33°58′10″S 22°25′49″E	The beacon together with others was caused to be erected by Governor Van der Graaff in 1785 to show the Company’s authority and to strengthen its claim to the territory. The public library of George stands in the shadow of a giant, historical oak. Type of site: Beacon. The beacon together with others was caused to be erected by Governor Van der Graaff in 1785 to show the Company's authority and to strengthen its claim to the territory.
9/2/030/0018	Fancourt Hotel, George	Type of site: Hotel	George	George	Provincial Heritage Site	33°57′01″S 22°24′25″E	Upload Photo
9/2/030/0019	St Peter & St Paul's Roman Catholic Church, Mead Street, George		George	George			Upload Photo
9/2/030/0020	Seven-day Adventist Church, 47 Market Street, George		George	George		33°57′47″S 22°27′37″E	Upload Photo
9/2/030/0022	Oakhurst, Hoekwil, George District		George	George		33°57′31″S 22°27′40″E	Upload Photo
9/2/030/0023	Cradock Pass, George District	Type of site: Pass		George	Provincial Heritage Site	33°58′17″S 22°27′12″E	Upload Photo
9/2/030/0023/01	Outeniqua Cableway, Cradock Pass, George District		George	George			Upload Photo
9/2/030/0024	Oorskotjie, York Street, George		George	George			Upload Photo
9/2/030/0025	Outeniqua Pass, George District		George	George			Upload Photo
9/2/030/0026	127 York Street, George		George	George		33°57′21″S 22°27′29″E	Upload Photo
9/2/030/0028	Oak tree, Main Street, George	On the Groote Wagen Weg from Swellendam via Mossel Bay to the east lies 'the prettiest little town in the world' according to Anthony Trollope. The first traveller to be enraptured by this beautiful valley in the foothills of the Outeniqua Mountains was Type of site: Tree	George	George	Provincial Heritage Site	33°59′23″S 22°28′47″E	On the Groote Wagen Weg from Swellendam via Mossel Bay to the east lies 'the prettiest little town in the world' according to Anthony Trollope. The first traveller to be enraptured by this beautiful valley in the foothills of the Outeniqua Mountains was Type of site: Tree
9/2/030/0029	PACALTSDORP LOCAL AREA, GENERAL		Pacaltsdorp	George			Upload Photo
9/2/030/0030	The Attic, 33 Langenhoven Street, George	This impressive double-storeyed building with its Georgian features was erected in about 1840. In 1982 it was restored and converted into offices.	George	George	Provincial Heritage Site	33°57′24″S 22°27′08″E	This impressive double-storeyed building with its Georgian features was erected in about 1840. In 1982 it was restored and converted into offices.
9/2/030/0031	St Pauls Church School, Market Lane, George	This building was erected in 1855 and for many years served as the school and church for the Coloured community of St Mark's. Type of site: School This building was erected in 1855 and for many years served as the school and church for the Coloured community of St Mark's.	George	George	Provincial Heritage Site	33°57′49″S 22°27′41″E	This building was erected in 1855 and for many years served as the school and church for the Coloured community of St Mark's. Type of site: School This building was erected in 1855 and for many years served as the school and church for the Coloured community of St Mark's.
9/2/030/0033	Meulrivier, George District	Type of site: Farmstead		George	Provincial Heritage Site	33°59′23″S 22°29′32″E	Upload Photo
9/2/030/0034	Old George-Knysna Road, George District	The road between George and Knysna was constructed with great skill between 1862 and 1882 by Thomas Bain. It has seven passes crossing rivers in densely forested gorges. The declared part is unspoilt and includes two concrete bridges. This picturesque grav Type of site: Road		George	Provincial Heritage Site	22°29′32″N 22°29′25″E	The road between George and Knysna was constructed with great skill between 1862 and 1882 by Thomas Bain. It has seven passes crossing rivers in densely forested gorges. The declared part is unspoilt and includes two concrete bridges. This picturesque grav Type of site: Road
9/2/030/0034-001	Kaaimans River Bridge, Old George-Knysna Road, George District	Type of site: Bridge		George	Provincial Heritage Site	33°58′16″S 22°32′52″E	Type of site: Bridge
9/2/030/0034-002	Silver River Bridge, Old George-Knysna Road, George District	Type of site: Bridge		George	Provincial Heritage Site	33°57′54″S 22°33′42″E	Upload Photo
9/2/030/0034-003	Touw River Bridge, Old George-Knysna Road, George District	Type of site: Bridge		George	Provincial Heritage Site	33°56′48″S 22°36′44″E	Upload Photo
9/2/030/0035	Ralsons, 48 Hibernia Street, George		George	George		33°57′40″S 22°27′42″E	Upload Photo
9/2/030/0036	Barn complex, Wilderness, George District		Wilderness	George			Upload Photo
9/2/030/0037	GEORGE MAGISTERIAL DISTRICT, GENERAL		George	George			Upload Photo
9/2/030/0038	Fairview, 36 Stander Street, George		George, Bergsig	George	Register	33°57′25″S 22°28′37″E	
9/2/030/0039	WILDERNESS LOCAL AREA		Wilderness	George			Upload Photo
9/2/030/0040	St. Marks Anglican Cathedral, York Street, George		George	George		33°57′27″S 22°27′30″E	
9/2/030/0040/01	St. Marks Anglican Cathedral Cemetery		George	George		33°57′27″S 22°27′30″E	
9/2/030/0041	Riversyde, 2 Lang Street, George		George	George		33°58′50″S 22°26′39″E	Upload Photo
9/2/064/0001	MOSSEL BAY MUNICIPAL AREA, GENERAL		Mossel Bay	Mossel Bay			Upload Photo
9/2/064/0002	20-22 Upper Cross Street, Mossel Bay		Mossel Bay	Mossel Bay		34°11′02″S 22°09′08″E	Upload Photo
9/2/064/0003	Bartolomeu Dias Museum Complex, Mossel Bay	Current use: Museum.	Mossel Bay	Mossel Bay	Provincial Heritage Site	34°10′48″S 22°08′36″E	Current use: Museum. Media related to Bartolomeu Dias museum complex at Wikimedia Commons
9/2/064/0003/001	Post office tree area, Bartholomeu Dias Museum Complex, Mossel Bay	White Milkwood (Sideroxylon Inerme) 5 m tall A romantic tale centres round this tree in Munro Bay Road, about one kilometre from the Mossel Bay railway station and 350 metres from Santos Beach. Nearly two and a half centuries before the white colonists found their way with difficulty over the mountain Type of site: Tree Part of the Museum Complex Landmark feature Associated with an historical period Contributes to the character of the area	Mossel Bay	Mossel Bay	Provincial Heritage Site	34°10′48″S 22°08′37″E	White Milkwood (Sideroxylon Inerme) 5 m tall A romantic tale centres round this tree in Munro Bay Road, about one kilometre from the Mossel Bay railway station and 350 metres from Santos Beach. Nearly two and a half centuries before the white colonists found their way with difficulty over the mountain Type of site: Tree Part of the Museum Complex Landmark feature Associated with an historical period Contributes to the character of the area
9/2/064/0003/002	Munro's Corner, Bartholomeu Dias Museum Complex, Mossel Bay	Current use: Museum.	Mossel Bay	Mossel Bay	Provincial Heritage Site	34°10′48″S 22°08′33″E	Current use: Museum.
9/2/064/0004	66 Montagu Street, Mossel Bay		Mossel Bay	Mossel Bay	National Monument	34°11′03″S 22°08′50″E	Upload Photo
9/2/064/0005	46 Upper Cross Street, Mossel Bay		Mossel Bay	Mossel Bay		34°11′01″S 22°08′56″E	Upload Photo
9/2/064/0006	Attaquaskloof Pass, Mossel Bay District	Type of site: Pass Attaqua's Kloof is named after the tribe of Khoi living in the vicinity when the pass was traversed in 1689 by Ensign Isaac Schrijver and his party from the Cape. It is the oldest pass in the Langeberg and Outeniqua Mountain ranges of the Southern Cape,		Mossel Bay	Provincial Heritage Site	34°11′00″S 22°07′56″E	Type of site: Pass Attaqua's Kloof is named after the tribe of Khoi living in the vicinity when the pass was traversed in 1689 by Ensign Isaac Schrijver and his party from the Cape. It is the oldest pass in the Langeberg and Outeniqua Mountain ranges of the Southern Cape,
9/2/064/0007	St Thomas Church, 28 Marsh Street, Mossel Bay		Mossel Bay	Mossel Bay	Pending Declaration	34°11′00″S 22°09′01″E	Upload Photo
9/2/064/0008	Cape St Blaize Lighthouse, Mossel Bay District		Mossel Bay	Mossel Bay		34°11′10″S 22°09′23″E	Upload Photo
9/2/064/0009	24 Montagu Street, Mossel Bay		Mossel Bay	Mossel Bay		34°11′04″S 22°09′05″E	Upload Photo
9/2/064/0010	St Peters Church, Marsh Street, Mossel Bay	Exterior: English style stone church Stone: fibre cement tiles (originally Welsh slate) Steep pitched hammer beam roof Tower has an unusual stone steeple Parapets, gables and buttresses have dressed stone copings Teak doors The nave has diamond pane Type of site: Church; Current use: Church : Anglican. Associated with religious activity Important example of a style and building type Possesses fine workmanship or aesthetic qualities A landmark building	Mossel Bay	Mossel Bay	Provincial Heritage Site	34°10′56″S 22°08′21″E	Exterior: English style stone church Stone: fibre cement tiles (originally Welsh slate) Steep pitched hammer beam roof Tower has an unusual stone steeple Parapets, gables and buttresses have dressed stone copings Teak doors The nave has diamond pane Type of site: Church Current use: Church : Anglican. Associated with religious activity Important example of a style and building type Possesses fine workmanship or aesthetic qualities A landmark building Media related to St Peter's Church, Mossel Bay at Wikimedia Commons
9/2/064/0011	84 Hill Street, Mossel Bay		Mossel Bay	Mossel Bay	Pending Declaration	34°11′06″S 22°08′43″E	Upload Photo
9/2/064/0012	Ochre Building, Church Street, Mossel Bay		Mossel Bay	Mossel Bay			Upload Photo
9/2/064/0013	14 Queen Street, Mossel Bay		Mossel Bay	Mossel Bay		34°11′01″S 22°08′49″E	Upload Photo
9/2/064/0014	Old Municipal Cemetery, Mossel Bay		Mossel Bay	Mossel Bay		34°11′13″S 22°07′12″E	Upload Photo
9/2/064/0015	GREAT BRAK RIVER MUNICIPAL AREA, MOSSEL BAY DISTRICT, GENERAL		Mossel Bay	Mossel Bay			Upload Photo
9/2/064/0015-001	Riversyde House, 2 Long Street, Great Brak River		Great Brak River	Mossel Bay	Register	34°02′27″S 22°13′16″E	Upload Photo
9/2/064/0016	Langkraal, Mossel Bay District	The land on which the Langkraal homestead is situated originally formed part of the farm Outeniquasbosch which was granted to Jean Charles de la Harpe in 1815. The Cape Dutch farmhouse erected by him is believed to have been enlarged during the 1840s, Th		Mossel Bay	Provincial Heritage Site	34°11′01″S 22°08′08″E	Upload Photo
9/2/064/0017	Prince Vincent & Co building, 86 Bland Street, Mossel Bay		Mossel Bay	Mossel Bay	National Monument	34°10′54″S 22°08′36″E	Upload Photo
9/2/064/0018	LITTLE BRAK RIVER MUNICIPAL AREA, MOSSEL BAY DISTRICT, GENERAL		Mossel Bay	Mossel Bay			Upload Photo
9/2/064/0019	31 Marsh Street, Mossel Bay		Mossel Bay	Mossel Bay		34°10′57″S 22°09′01″E	Upload Photo
9/2/064/0020	52 & 54 Bland Street, Mossel Bay		Mossel Bay	Mossel Bay		34°10′54″S 22°09′00″E	Upload Photo
9/2/064/0021	Dutch Reformed Church, Friemersheim, Great Brak River		Mossel Bay	Mossel Bay		34°03′00″S 22°12′53″E	Upload Photo
9/2/064/0022	HERBERTSDALE MUNICIPAL AREA, MOSSEL BAY DISTRICT, GENERAL		Mossel Bay	Mossel Bay			Upload Photo
9/2/064/0023	Park House, 118 Montagu Street, Mossel Bay		Mossel Bay	Mossel Bay		34°11′01″S 22°08′29″E	Upload Photo
9/2/064/0024	38 Marsh Street, Mossel Bay		Mossel Bay	Mossel Bay		34°11′02″S 22°09′16″E	Upload Photo
9/2/064/0025	HARTENBOS MUNICIPAL AREA, MOSSEL BAY DISTRICT, GENERAL		Mossel Bay	Mossel Bay			Upload Photo
9/2/064/0027	Old Market Hall, Market Square, Mossel Bay	This impressive building was erected in approximately 1852 and forms an essential part of the historic centre of Mossel Bay Type of site: Market Hall This impressive building was erected in approximately 1852 and forms an essential part of the historic centre of Mossel Bay	Mossel Bay	Mossel Bay	Provincial Heritage Site	34°10′49″S 22°08′35″E	Upload Photo
9/2/064/0028	Carpenter's shop, 87 Montagu Street, Mossel Bay	Single storey, rectangular, 3 bays Stone: corrugated iron Pitched roof with parapet gable end on Marsh Street façade Arched doorway with 4 panelled double doors and arched fanlight Front elevation has 2x2 sash windows West elevation has 2x3 sash windows The building is thought to be by Sir Herbert Baker and built by W.J. Swart in 1898. The stone was apparently quarried from Cape St Blaize and crafted by Mr. Swart himself. After his death, the building was used as a house, a doveclub and later for storage. Important example of building type and design Contributes to character of the street and area	Mossel Bay	Mossel Bay	Provincial Heritage Site	34°11′02″S 22°08′40″E	Upload Photo
9/2/064/0029	The Point, Mossel Bay	Three irregular rows following the curve of the shoreline Middle and back rows separated by a curved road Pathways, some with steps, situated between the bungalows. Most bungalows started as rectangular buildings with front verandahs and rear lean-tos The bungalows represent a style of seaside holidaying that was popular in South Africa, but of which very little remains. They were built in the aftermath of WW II. It was especially people from inland who had the need to escape the heat who came to camp Type of site: Holiday Village Important example of a building type and style Form a coherent group of buildings (scale, form, layout and construction) Associated with social activity Illustrates an historical period	Mossel Bay	Mossel Bay	Provisional Protection	34°11′05″S 22°09′23″E	Upload Photo
9/2/064/0030	MOSSEL BAY MAGISTERIAL DISTRICT, GENERAL		Mossel Bay	Mossel Bay			Upload Photo
9/2/064/0031	Gourits River Bridge, Mossel Bay District		Mossel Bay	Mossel Bay		34°11′10″S 21°45′11″E	Upload Photo
9/2/064/0032	15 Meyer Street, Mossel Bay		Mossel Bay	Mossel Bay		34°11′00″S 22°08′47″E	Upload Photo
9/2/064/0033	Methodist Church Complex, Queen Street, Mossel Bay		Mossel Bay	Mossel Bay		34°11′00″S 22°08′50″E	Upload Photo
9/2/064/0034	Military Grave, Farm Brandwacht, Mossel Bay District		Mossel Bay	Mossel Bay			Upload Photo
9/2/064/0035	Burial Site, Voelvlei, Mossel Bay District		Mossel Bay	Mossel Bay			Upload Photo
9/2/064/0036	Burial Site, Nestle Factory, Voorbaai Mossel Bay Dist		Mossel Bay	Mossel Bay			Upload Photo
9/2/064/0038	TARKA LOCAL AREA, GENERAL		Mossel Bay	Mossel Bay			Upload Photo
9/2/064/0039	Friemersheim (near Great Brak Municipal Area), Mossel Bay District		Mossel Bay	Mossel Bay		33°57′36″S 22°08′15″E	Upload Photo
