= Herolds Bay =

Herolds Bay Heroldsbaai
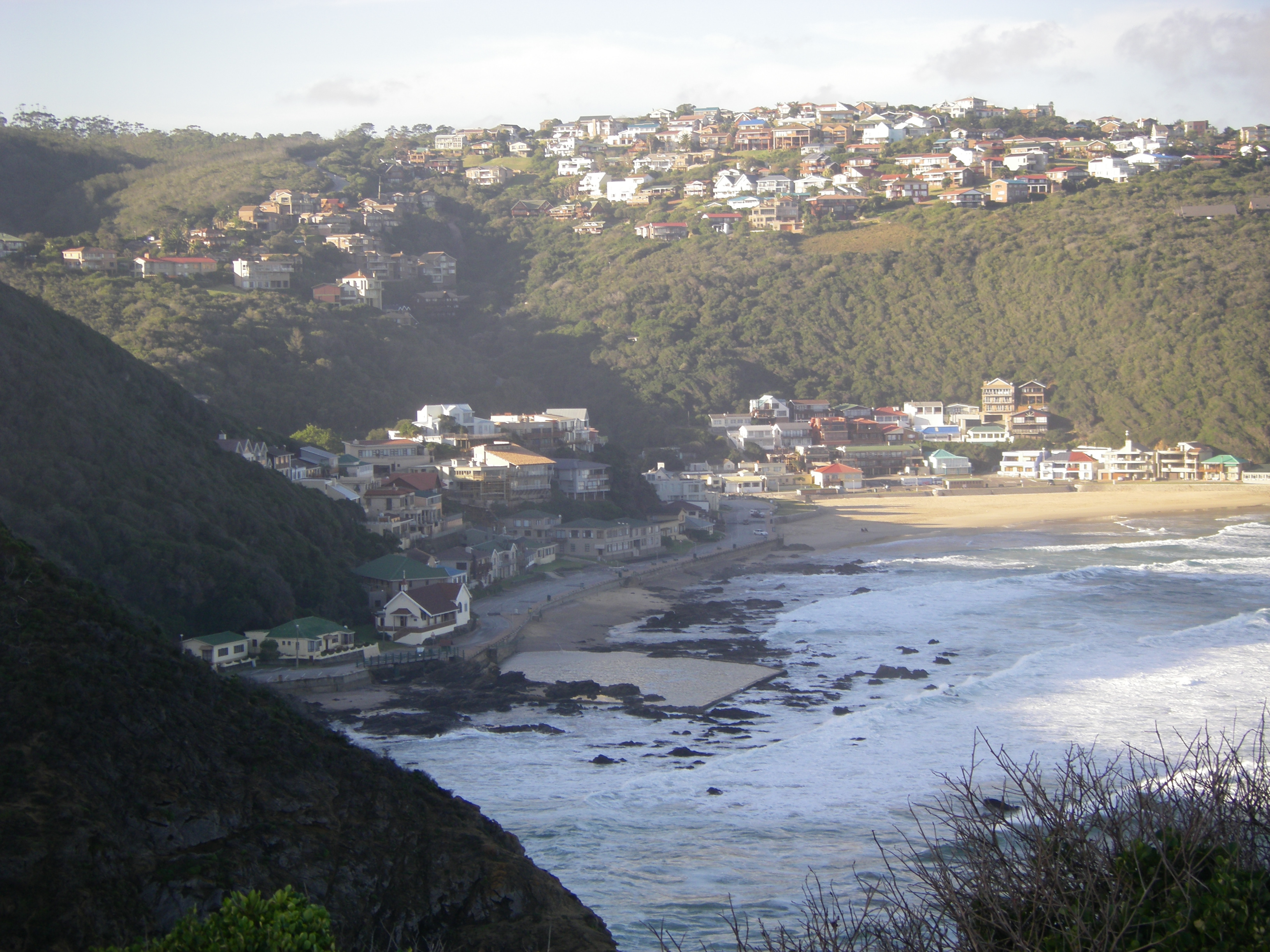
- View from a lookout point south west of the town.

- Location within Western Cape Location within South Africa
- Coordinates: 34°03′02″S 22°23′51″E
- Country: South Africa
- Province: Western Cape
- District: Garden Route
- Municipality: George

Area
  - Total: 1.03 km^{2} (0.40 sq mi)

Population (2011)
  - Total: 704
  - Density: 683/km^{2} (1,770/sq mi)

Racial makeup (2011)
  - Black African: 2.7%
  - Coloured: 33.8%
  - Indian/Asian: 0.1%
  - White: 61.6%
  - Other: 1.7%

First languages (2011)
  - Afrikaans: 89.8%
  - English: 9.6%
  - Other: 0.6%
- Time zone: UTC+2 (SAST)

Herolds Bay (Afrikaans: Heroldsbaai) is a beach resort on the Southern Cape coast. It is 6.4 km from George Airport and can be reached by the R404 (the Skimmelkrans road).

== History ==
The beach resort was initially part of the farm Brakfontein, then property of Dirk Lamprecht and later of Frans Gericke. The latter's descendants still have interests in the area. Although it was first known as Sandstrand, in 1823 it was named after the first vicar on George, Tobias Johannes Herold, a keen angler. At first it was mainly George and people from the immediate vicinity who camped here. Later they were followed by a small group from Oudtshoorn (and especially the Kamanassie). Oompie Meyer and John Urban, both well-known residents of George, took on the task in 1904 of demarcating small plots of land for the vacationers' tents, wagons and canopies. Building materials were delivered on sleds pulled by mules. The first holiday home was built in 1895 for Matilda Howitson from Blanco. This was the first step in the development of a formal holiday resort. Before 1928, there was only one house on the west side, Sandstrand Street. This is the house west of the church and built for the sisters and girls of the Convent School on George. The list of early visitors and home owners is a list of the names of all the notables of the time in the immediate vicinity. The first permanent resident was one Thompson. He was a survivor of a shipwreck in 1920 and made his home in a beachside cave for eight years.

== Swimming, fishing, surfing ==
The waves are a popular playground on hot days. Across from the Stella Maris Chapel, John Urban and the George Divisional Council had a large tidal pool built for swimmers in 1935. During the apartheid years, a pool was built in Skulpieshoek. Surfers are found in the bay all year round. During the summer school holidays, the municipality of George has a team of trained beach guards on duty during daylight hours.

For the angler, the area is a paradise. Eastwards a footpath leads over the rocks to Scott's Bank, Dollieskraal and Dutton's Cove. On the west side a footpath leads to Voëlklip. It can also be reached by car via the Rooikransies Road which turns south from the tarred Skimmelkrans Road. From the exit to Voëlklip it is 2½ km on a dirt road. After almost 1 km from the exit there is a parking space to walk to Rooikransies and further west to the Maalgaten River.

== Access routes ==
In the early years, the heavily laden ox carts made their way to the bay. Especially the last steep descent must have been no easy task for man, ox and cart. Everything needed for the holiday had to be taken along, including live chickens that would be part of the Christmas meal. On arrival, the oxen were herded into the sea to get rid of their ticks. After that they and the wagons went back to the plateau where the Gerickes took care of them until the retreat was started.

In 1911 the first road to Herolds Bay was built. It roughly followed the track of the bullock carts from George. Between the current Bos-en-Dal neighbourhood and the railway, across the farm Soutkloof, through the Gwaing River and past the farm Dutton's Cove. Near the sea the road, now known as the Rooidraai Road, was very steep.

In 1958 the tarmac road from the N2 national road to Herolds Bay was completed. At the airport, the R404 turns away, takes a bridge over the railway line near the Skimmelkrans station and a pass in the Brakfontein cliff. In 1999 the Rooidraai Road (from Heroldsbaai Heights to the bay) was paved. Three years later, the old road from Skimmelkrans station to Herolds Bay Heights was rebuilt and tarred. With this route, Herolds Bay is 6 km from the N2.

== Church ==
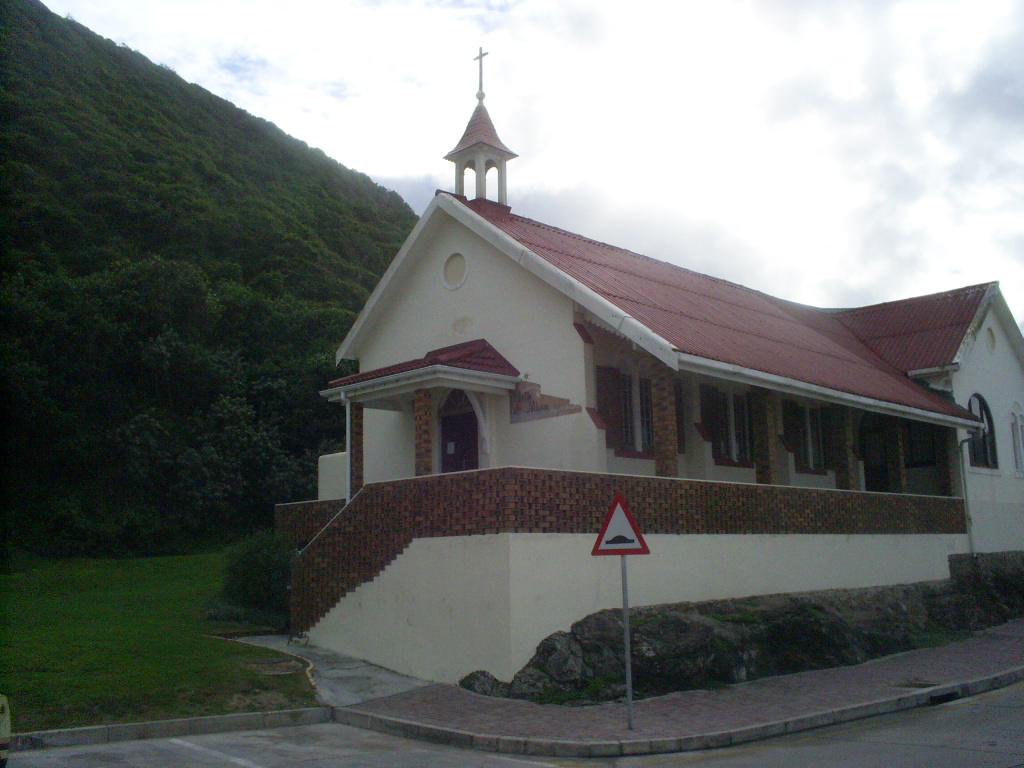
Herolds Bay's Roman Catholic church.

In 1933, the Roman Catholic Church built a chapel next to their house. John Urban and his wife (of the famous Urban shoe factory on George) donated the land and were also closely involved in the building of the chapel. Today, the Stella Maris Chapel is a well-known landmark in the settlement.

The church hall of the Dutch Reformed Church was built in 1941 on the plot donated for the purpose by Cecil Gericke. Fresh water was, as with many beach resorts, a problem from the start. The church took advantage of the opportunity by selling fresh water to pay off their building loan. In 1987, the church hall was converted into a church centre with the addition of two youth homes. Currently it is the property of the Dutch Reformed congregation George-Suid.

== Development ==
There have been guest houses since the early 1940s. There is one shop that is open throughout the year. During the school holidays and weekends there are a few kiosks along the beach.

Herolds Bay has few permanent residents. Most houses are very modest and date from the first half of the last century. Some of these old houses have been demolished and replaced with double-storey buildings. Where the Skimmelkrans Road dead ends, Ernie Els had a house built next to the beach.

In 1972, part of the farm Buffelsfontein on the plateau was converted into the Herolds Bay Heights residential area. There are many permanent residents who mostly work in George. With this development, Herolds Bay is also connected to George's electricity, water and sewer network. This benefited further development. Several people also live at the nearby golf estate at Oubaai (Dutton's Cove).

== Dangers ==
In June 1935 Herolds Bay was hit by the highest flood in human memory. It was also accompanied by heavy downpours and caused the Brakfontein brook to run strongly. A plaque in the gorge shows the highest water level recorded at the time. Between Christmas and New Year 1949 it rained so much that the muddy water ran down the slopes through houses and tents. Ten years later, a stormy sea caused damage again. Girls from the convent school on George who were in their beach house had to climb up the head to get away while their trunks were washed around in the waves. In 1980, a reinforced sea wall was built to try to prevent damage to the coastal properties. Again between Christmas and New Year, but now in 2008, the sea was so rough that it covered Skimmelkrans Lane and Sandstrand Street up to the houses with a thick layer of foam.

Sea currents on the western as well as the eastern side of the bay are extremely treacherous. Several bathers have already drowned here and anglers have been knocked off the rocks by freak waves.

== Vegetation ==
Coastal winds from the south carry air with a lot of salt to the land. Together with the dry summers, this causes the fynbos to remain particularly low on the slopes on the sea side. In the sheltered Brakfonteinkloof, the vegetation is significantly higher. This low fynbos is unique in this small area. Unfortunately, one-third of the original fynbos has already been lost to development. Milkwood trees that grew right up to the beach were all lost.

Home remedies against the ever-dreaded blue blisters have been applied for years. To relieve the pain, the fresh leaves of the sour fig and the creeper were applied to the burn marks to relieve the pain.

== Archaeology ==
For many centuries, the first inhabitants of the area fished and collected shellfish. Behind the house Klamarni and adjacent houses is a cave of great archaeological interest. Remains in it indicate that it was inhabited by humans and animals some 100,000 years ago. According to Marincowitz, bones of the extinct bluebuck (Hippotragus leucophaeus) were found in it. In 1979 the site was declared a national monument.

== Geology ==
The rocks in the bay were deposited between 600 and 900 million years ago as clay and muddy sand. About 580 million years ago it came under pressure from the southwest and the rocks were folded, broken and cracked. At the same time, granite seeped into the cracks in the form of magma with a temperature of up to 1,000 degrees Celsius. With the result that the sediment was heated to about 600 degrees C and changed into the rocks that are found there today.

On Herolds Bay the cracks and folds were more intense than elsewhere on this coast. This can be seen in the rocks at the older tidal pool and the contact between the sediment and granite on the east side of the bay. These cracks weakened the rock so that it was eroded more quickly by the waves. This is what made the Herolds Bay of today, because the Brakfontein Spruit never runs so strong that it could have formed the bay on its own.

== See also ==
- Herold
- List of populated places in South Africa
