= N9 (South Africa) =

National road in South Africa

National route N9

Route information
- Maintained by SANRAL
- Length: 517 km (321 mi)

Major junctions
- Southwest end: N2 near George
- N12 near George; N10 near Middelburg
- Northeast end: N1 at Colesberg

Location
- Country: South Africa
- Provinces: Western Cape, Eastern Cape, Northern Cape
- Major cities: George; Uniondale; Willowmore; Graaff-Reinet; Middelburg; Colesberg

Highway system
- Numbered routes of South Africa
← N8	→ N10

The N9 is a national route in South Africa that connects the N2 at George with the N1 at Colesberg via Graaff-Reinet and Middelburg.

== Route ==
Map

=== Western Cape ===
The N9 begins just south-east of George in the Western Cape at an intersection with the N2. It runs concurrently with the N12 through the center of George and then north over the Outeniqua Pass. At the top of the pass, at the intersection with the R62, the N9 and N12 split, with the N12 being cosigned with the R62 northwards towards Oudtshoorn while the N9 turns east, cosigned with the R62, to run along the northern side of the Outeniqua Mountains and over Potjiesberg Pass.

After 71 kilometres, the N9 and the R62 split, with the R62 becoming its own road eastwards while the N9 turns northwards and enters the town of Uniondale, before becoming the Buyspoort Pass and proceeding onwards to Willowmore in the Eastern Cape.

=== Eastern Cape ===
From Willowmore, the N9 travels across the Eastern Cape Karoo as the Perdepoort Pass, through Aberdeen to Graaff-Reinet. At Aberdeen, the N9 is joined by the R61 and they are concurrent through Graaff-Reinet (where they meet the R63) and for the next 46 kilometres before the R61 becomes its own road eastwards near Nieu-Bethesda.

From Graaff-Reinet it crosses the Sneeuberge through Naudesberg Pass and Lootsberg Pass to Middelburg, where it meets the N10 south of the town centre. The N10 joins the N9 to form an eastern bypass around Middelburg before proceeding northwards out of the town. After being concurrent for 24 kilometres, the N10 becomes its own road north-west towards De Aar.

=== Northern Cape ===
The N9 continues northwards, entering the Northern Cape, through Noupoort, to end at an intersection with the N1 just outside Colesberg (west of the town centre).

== Uniondale Ghost ==
An urban legend in the "vanishing hitchhiker" tradition arose after a girl named Marie Charlotte Roux was killed in an auto accident not far from Uniondale on Easter Sunday of 1968. According to press reports, beginning in 1973 and for years afterward around the anniversary of her death, the girl's spirit hitchhiked along the road and allegedly vanished after being picked up by various drivers. According to folklorist Sigrid Schmidt:

The South African press played its role in the game of legend-telling perfectly. It transformed the legend into an official report...[until] a nationwide Uniondale legend was formed by the press, and people were left expecting the ghost girl to hitchhike at the same spot next Easter.

== Junctions ==
=== Western Cape ===
Municipality	Location	km	mi	Exit	Destinations	Notes
George	George	0	0	(437)	N2, Mossel Bay, Knysna	Southern end of concurrency with N12
George	George	0	0	—	R102 York Street, George Central, George Airport, Mossel Bay	At-grade traffic circle
George	George	0	0	—	R404 Montagu Street, George Airport, Herolds Bay	At-grade intersection
George	Herold	0	0	—	N12, R62 north, Oudtshoorn	At-grade intersection; Northern end of concurrency with N12; Western end of concurrency with R62
George	Avontuur	0	0	—	R62 east, Avontuur, Joubertina	At-grade intersection; Eastern end of concurrency with R62
George	Uniondale	0	0	—	R339 Voortrekker Street south, Uniondale, Avontuur	At-grade intersection; Southern end of concurrency with R339
George	Uniondale	0	0	—	R339 north, De Rust	At-grade intersection; Northern end of concurrency with R339
George	Uniondale	0	0	—	R341, De Rust	At-grade intersection
N9 continues into the Eastern Cape

=== Eastern Cape ===
Municipality	Location	km	mi	Exit	Destinations	Notes
Dr Beyers Naudé	Willowmore	0	0	—	R332, Winterhoek, Humansdorp	At-grade intersection
Dr Beyers Naudé	Willowmore	0	0	—	R329, Steytlerville, Gqeberha	At-grade intersection
Dr Beyers Naudé	Willowmore	0	0	—	R306, Rietbron, Beaufort West	At-grade intersection
Dr Beyers Naudé	Aberdeen	0	0	—	R338 Hoop Street, Aberdeen, Klipplaat, R61 west, Beaufort West	At-grade intersection; Southern end of concurrency with R61
Dr Beyers Naudé	Graaff-Reinet	0	0	—	R63 south, Somerset East, Gqeberha	At-grade intersection; Southern end of concurrency with R63
Dr Beyers Naudé	Graaff-Reinet	0	0	—	R63 Caledon Street west, Murraysburg	At-grade intersection; Northern end of concurrency with R63
Dr Beyers Naudé	Nieu-Bethesda	0	0	—	R61 east, Nxuba	At-grade intersection; Northern end of concurrency with R61
Inxuba Yethemba	Middelburg	0	0	—	N10 south, Nxuba, Meintjies Street, Middelburg	Quadrant interchange with ramps; Southern end of concurrency with N10
Inxuba Yethemba	Middelburg	0	0	—	R56, Middelburg, Steynsburg	Quadrant interchange
Inxuba Yethemba	Middelburg	0	0	—	N10 north, Hanover, De Aar	At-grade intersection; Northern end of concurrency with N10
N9 continues into the Northern Cape

=== Northern Cape ===
Municipality	Location	km	mi	Exit	Destinations	Notes
Umsobomvu	Noupoort	0	0	—	R389 Shaw Street, Noupoort, Hanover	At-grade intersection
Umsobomvu	Colesberg	0	0	(794A)	N1 south, Cape Town	Signed as exit 794 southbound
Umsobomvu	Colesberg	0	0	(794B)	N1 north, Bloemfontein	Northbound exit, southbound entrance
Umsobomvu	Colesberg	0	0	—	Sluiters Street, Colesberg	At-grade intersection
N9 ends

== See also ==
- R306 (Eastern Cape) connecting road
