= R404 (South Africa) =

Regional route in South Africa

Regional route R404
- R404 route map

Route information
- Length: 20 km (12 mi)

Major junctions
- North end: N9 / N12 outside George
- R102 north of George Airport; N2 south of George Airport
- South end: Herolds Bay

Location
- Country: South Africa
- Major cities: George
- Towns: Herolds Bay

Highway system
- Numbered routes of South Africa
← R403	→ R405

The R404 is a Regional Route in South Africa that connects George with Herolds Bay.

== Route ==
The R404 begins approximately 6 kilometres north-west of the George city centre at an intersection with the N9 and N12 national routes (Outeniqua Pass), west of the Montagu Pass. It begins by heading south-south-west for 9 kilometres, through the Blanco neighbourhood of George, to reach a junction with the R102 road. It reaches the George Airport entrance just after the R102 junction and forms the eastern boundary of the airport before crossing the N2 freeway (Garden Route). From the N2 junction, the R404 heads southwards for 5 kilometres as the Skimmelkrans road to reach its end at the town of Herolds Bay on the Indian Ocean coastline.

== Incidents ==
On 7 December 2009 an Embraer ERJ 135 aircraft operated by Airlink on a scheduled flight (SA-8625) overrun the runway at George Airport in wet conditions and ended up on the R404.
