= Erica aneimena =

Scientific classification
- Kingdom: Plantae
- Clade: Tracheophytes
- Clade: Angiosperms
- Clade: Eudicots
- Clade: Asterids
- Order: Ericales
- Family: Ericaceae
- Genus: Erica
- Species: E. aneimena

Binomial name
- Erica aneimena Dulfer

Synonyms
- Erica hirsuta Klotzsch ex Benth.

Species of flowering plant

Erica aneimena is a plant that belongs to the genus Erica and forms part of the fynbos. The species is endemic to the Western Cape where it occurs near George in the Outeniqua Mountains. The plant's habitat is threatened by invasive plants and forestry operations.
