= R337 (South Africa) =

Regional route in South Africa

Regional route R337
- R337 route map

Location
- Country: South Africa

Highway system
- Numbered routes of South Africa
← R336	→ R338

The R337 is a Regional Route in South Africa that connects Cradock and the R329 heading towards Willowmore via Jansenville.

== Route ==
From its northern origin in Cradock at the R390, it heads south-west, passing to the south of the Mountain Zebra National Park. It heads through Swaershoek Pass, and on the other side, it reaches a T-junction with an unsigned route. The R337 is signed as the western route, which eventually bends south to Pearston. There it becomes cosigned with the intersecting R63 before continuing out the town heading south-west. It then reaches the R75. It becomes cosigned, and the routes head through the Soutpansnek pass to reach Jansenville. At Jansenville, the route leaves the R75 heading east-south-east to Klipplaat. At that town, it intersects the R338 at a staggered junction. After leaving Klipplaat, the route enters the Swanepoelspoort Pass before reaching its terminus at the R329.
