= Swanepoelspoort =

Coordinates: 33°06′51.4″S 23°53′38.4″E

Swanepoelspoort Pass (English: Swanepoel's Gate or just Swanepoelspoort) is situated in the Eastern Cape, province of South Africa, on the R337 road between Willowmore and Klipplaat.
