= Wilhelm Stahl Provincial Hospital =

- Eastern Cape Department of Health

Geography
- Location: Middelburg, Chris Hani District Municipality, Eastern Cape, South Africa
- Coordinates: 31°29′30″S 25°00′02″E

Organisation
- Care system: Public
- Type: Community

Services
- Emergency department: Yes
- Beds: 32

Links
- Website: Eastern Cape Department of Health website - Chris Hani District Hospitals
- Other links: List of hospitals in South Africa

Wilhelm Stahl Provincial Hospital is a provincial government-funded hospital for the Inxuba Yethemba Local Municipality area in Middelburg, Eastern Cape in South Africa.

The hospital departments include emergency department, out patients department, surgical services, medical services, operating theatre & CSSD services, pharmacy, anti-retroviral (ARV) treatment for HIV/AIDS, post-trauma counseling services, laundry services, kitchen services and mortuary.
