= Disa arida =

Scientific classification
- Kingdom: Plantae
- Clade: Tracheophytes
- Clade: Angiosperms
- Clade: Monocots
- Order: Asparagales
- Family: Orchidaceae
- Subfamily: Orchidoideae
- Genus: Disa
- Species: D. arida

Binomial name
- Disa arida Vlok

Species of flowering plant

Disa arida is a perennial plant and geophyte that belongs to the genus Disa and is part of the fynbos. The species is endemic to the Western Cape and occurs in the Outeniqua Mountains, Rooiberg and Gamkaberg. The plant has an area of occurrence of 574 km2 and there are seven sub-populations. The plant is threatened by the invasive plant, the Hakea species. One subpopulation has been completely taken over by this invasive plant. A comprehensive investigation from 2008 to 2012 indicated that no sub-population has more than 250 plants. The total population was estimated at less than 2000 plants. Too many fires are also a threat as the plant only blooms in 20 to 25 year old fynbos.
