= Erica lehmannii =

Scientific classification
- Kingdom: Plantae
- Clade: Tracheophytes
- Clade: Angiosperms
- Clade: Eudicots
- Clade: Asterids
- Order: Ericales
- Family: Ericaceae
- Genus: Erica
- Species: E. lehmannii

Binomial name
- Erica lehmannii Klotzsch ex Benth.

Synonyms
- Ericoides lehmannii (Klotzsch ex Benth.) Kuntze

Species of flowering plant

Erica lehmannii is a plant that belongs to the genus Erica and is part of the fynbos. The species is endemic to the Western Cape and occurs between Knysna and George in the Outeniqua Mountains.
