= Lootsberg Pass =

Mountain pass in Eastern Cape, South Africa

Coordinates: 31°49′37.8″S 24°51′19.8″E

Lootsberg Pass (English: Pilot's Mountain), is situated in Sneeuberge, Eastern Cape, South Africa, on the National road N9, between Graaff-Reinet and Middelburg.

The pass is 1781m above mean sea level. The pass is named after Hendrik Loots who died after his carriage overturned on the pass. Due to occasional heavy snowfall, the pass has seen several accidents: In July 2017, a five car collision sent 19 people to hospital and a diesel tanker lost control in the snow also in July 2017, causing a subsequent fire.
