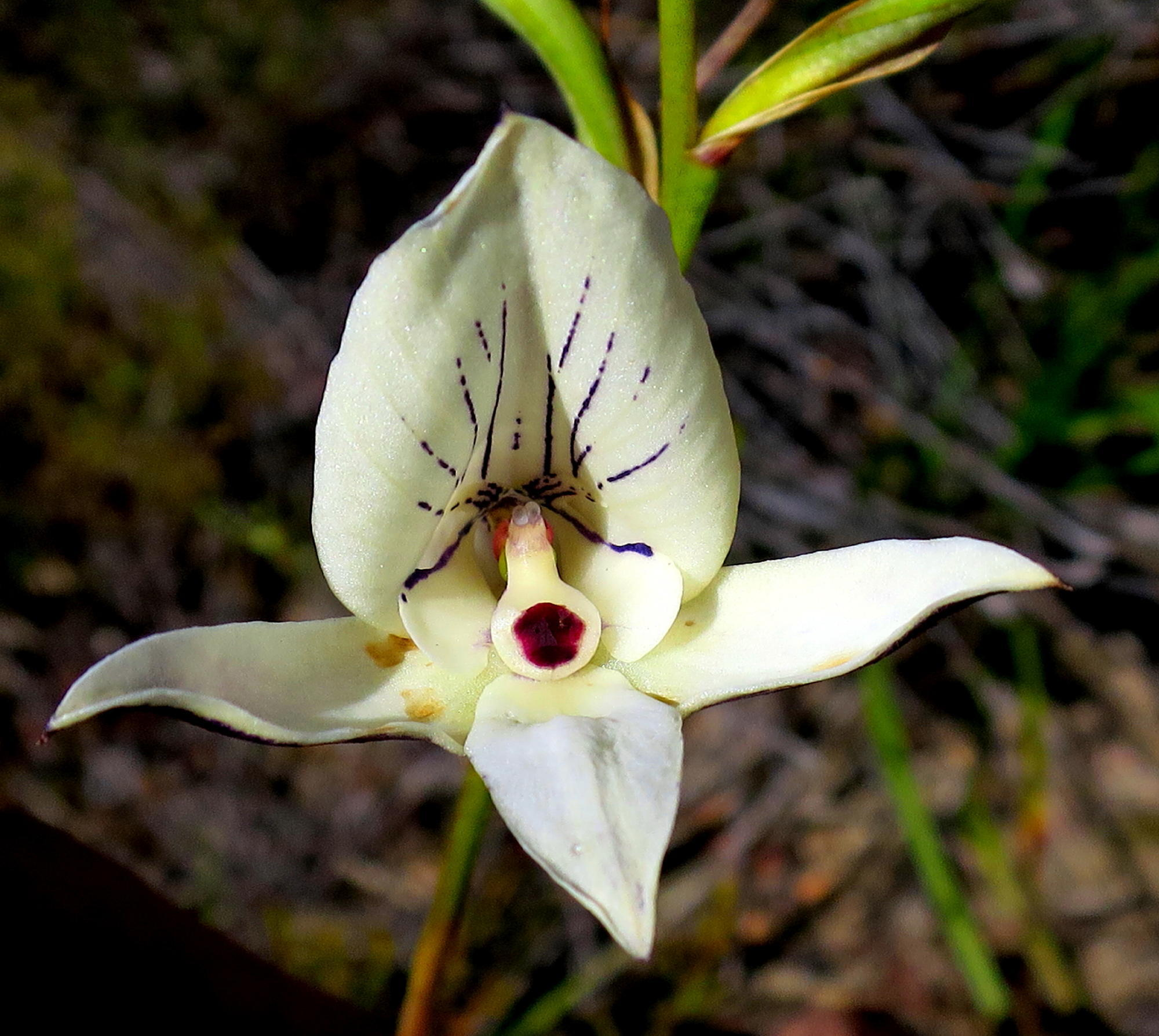

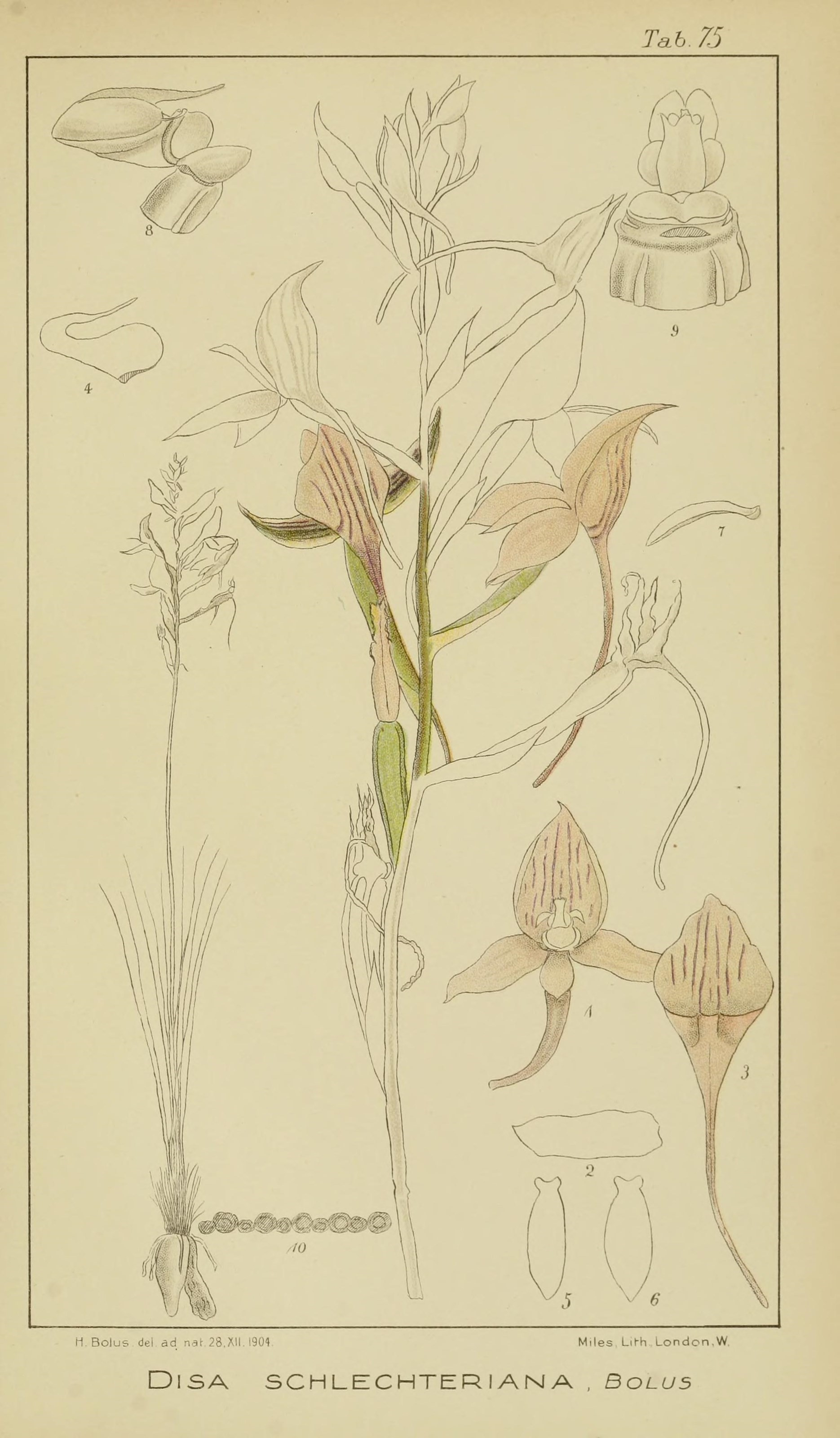

Scientific classification
- Kingdom: Plantae
- Clade: Tracheophytes
- Clade: Angiosperms
- Clade: Monocots
- Order: Asparagales
- Family: Orchidaceae
- Subfamily: Orchidoideae
- Genus: Disa
- Species: D. schlechteriana

Binomial name
- Disa schlechteriana Bolus

Synonyms
- Herschelia schlechteriana (Bolus) H.P.Linder; Herschelianthe schlechteriana (Bolus) N.C.Anthony

= Disa schlechteriana =

Species of flowering plant

Disa schlechteriana is a perennial plant and geophyte belonging to the genus Disa and is part of the fynbos. The plant is endemic to the Western Cape and occurs in the Langeberg and Outeniqua Mountains between Riversdale and George on the northern slopes. The plant has a range of 312 km^{2} (120 sq mi) and there are four to six subpopulations. The plant is threatened by invasive plants and uncontrolled picking of the Protea species.
