= Inxuba Yethemba Local Municipality elections =

The Inxuba Yethemba Local Municipality council, situated within the Chris Hani District Municipality in South Africa comprises eighteen members elected through a mixed-member proportional representation system. Nine councillors are elected via first-past-the-post voting in nine wards, while the remaining nine are selected from party lists to ensure that the total number of party representatives is proportional to the number of votes received. In the election of 1 November 2021, the African National Congress (ANC) secured a majority, winning ten seats.

== Results ==
The following table shows the composition of the council after past elections.

Event	ANC	DA	Other	Total
2000 election	12	5	0	17
2006 election	13	5	0	18
2011 election	12	6	0	18
2016 election	11	7	0	18
2021 election	10	7	1	18

== December 2000 election ==
The following table shows the results of the 2000 election.

Party	Ward			List			Total seats
Party	Votes	%	Seats	Votes	%	Seats	Total seats
African National Congress	10,383	67.33	6	10,413	67.74	6	12
Democratic Alliance	4,710	30.54	3	4,677	30.42	2	5
African Christian Democratic Party	147	0.95	0	283	1.84	0	0
Independent candidates	182	1.18	0				0
Total	15,422	100.00	9	15,373	100.00	8	17
Valid votes	15,422	97.91		15,373	97.92		
Invalid/blank votes	330	2.09		327	2.08		
Total votes	15,752	100.00		15,700	100.00		
Registered voters/turnout	25,916	60.78		25,916	60.58		

== March 2006 election ==
The following table shows the results of the 2006 election.

Party	Ward			List			Total seats
Party	Votes	%	Seats	Votes	%	Seats	Total seats
African National Congress	10,914	70.30	7	10,840	69.93	6	13
Democratic Alliance	4,181	26.93	2	4,199	27.09	3	5
African Christian Democratic Party	375	2.42	0	292	1.88	0	0
United Democratic Movement	55	0.35	0	170	1.10	0	0
Total	15,525	100.00	9	15,501	100.00	9	18
Valid votes	15,525	97.79		15,501	97.64		
Invalid/blank votes	351	2.21		374	2.36		
Total votes	15,876	100.00		15,875	100.00		
Registered voters/turnout	29,318	54.15		29,318	54.15		

== May 2011 election ==
The following table shows the results of the 2011 election.

Party	Ward			List			Total seats
Party	Votes	%	Seats	Votes	%	Seats	Total seats
African National Congress	11,132	63.11	6	11,363	64.67	6	12
Democratic Alliance	5,755	32.63	3	5,808	33.05	3	6
Freedom Front Plus	281	1.59	0	194	1.10	0	0
United Democratic Movement	182	1.03	0	207	1.18	0	0
Independent candidates	289	1.64	0				0
Total	17,639	100.00	9	17,572	100.00	9	18
Valid votes	17,639	97.86		17,572	97.59		
Invalid/blank votes	385	2.14		434	2.41		
Total votes	18,024	100.00		18,006	100.00		
Registered voters/turnout	30,238	59.61		30,238	59.55		

== August 2016 election ==
The following table shows the results of the 2016 election.

Party	Ward			List			Total seats
Party	Votes	%	Seats	Votes	%	Seats	Total seats
African National Congress	10,045	58.39	6	10,106	58.40	5	11
Democratic Alliance	6,730	39.12	3	6,728	38.88	4	7
Economic Freedom Fighters	428	2.49	0	470	2.72	0	0
Total	17,203	100.00	9	17,304	100.00	9	18
Valid votes	17,203	97.94		17,304	98.28		
Invalid/blank votes	362	2.06		303	1.72		
Total votes	17,565	100.00		17,607	100.00		
Registered voters/turnout	30,907	56.83		30,907	56.97		

== November 2021 election ==
The following table shows the results of the 2021 election.

Party	Ward			List			Total seats
Party	Votes	%	Seats	Votes	%	Seats	Total seats
African National Congress	7,519	52.44	5	7,665	53.64	5	10
Democratic Alliance	5,707	39.80	4	5,645	39.50	3	7
Patriotic Alliance	346	2.41	0	387	2.71	1	1
Economic Freedom Fighters	329	2.29	0	398	2.78	0	0
Freedom Front Plus	152	1.06	0	156	1.09	0	0
Independent candidates	269	1.88	0				0
African Transformation Movement	16	0.11	0	40	0.28	0	0
Total	14,338	100.00	9	14,291	100.00	9	18
Valid votes	14,338	98.06		14,291	97.92		
Invalid/blank votes	284	1.94		303	2.08		
Total votes	14,622	100.00		14,594	100.00		
Registered voters/turnout	29,691	49.25		29,691	49.15		
