= R338 (South Africa) =

Regional route in South Africa

Regional route R338
- R338 route map

Major junctions
- Northwest end: N9 at Aberdeen
- Southeast end: R329

Location
- Country: South Africa
- Towns: Klipplaat

Highway system
- Numbered routes of South Africa
← R337	→ R339

The R338 is a Regional Route in South Africa that connects Aberdeen with the R329 between Steytlerville and its origin at the R75.

Its northern origins is from the N9 at Aberdeen. It heads southeast to Klipplaat. At the town it intersects the R337 at a staggered junction. It leaves the town, and heads south-east to its southern origin at the R329.
