= Herold, South Africa =

Herold
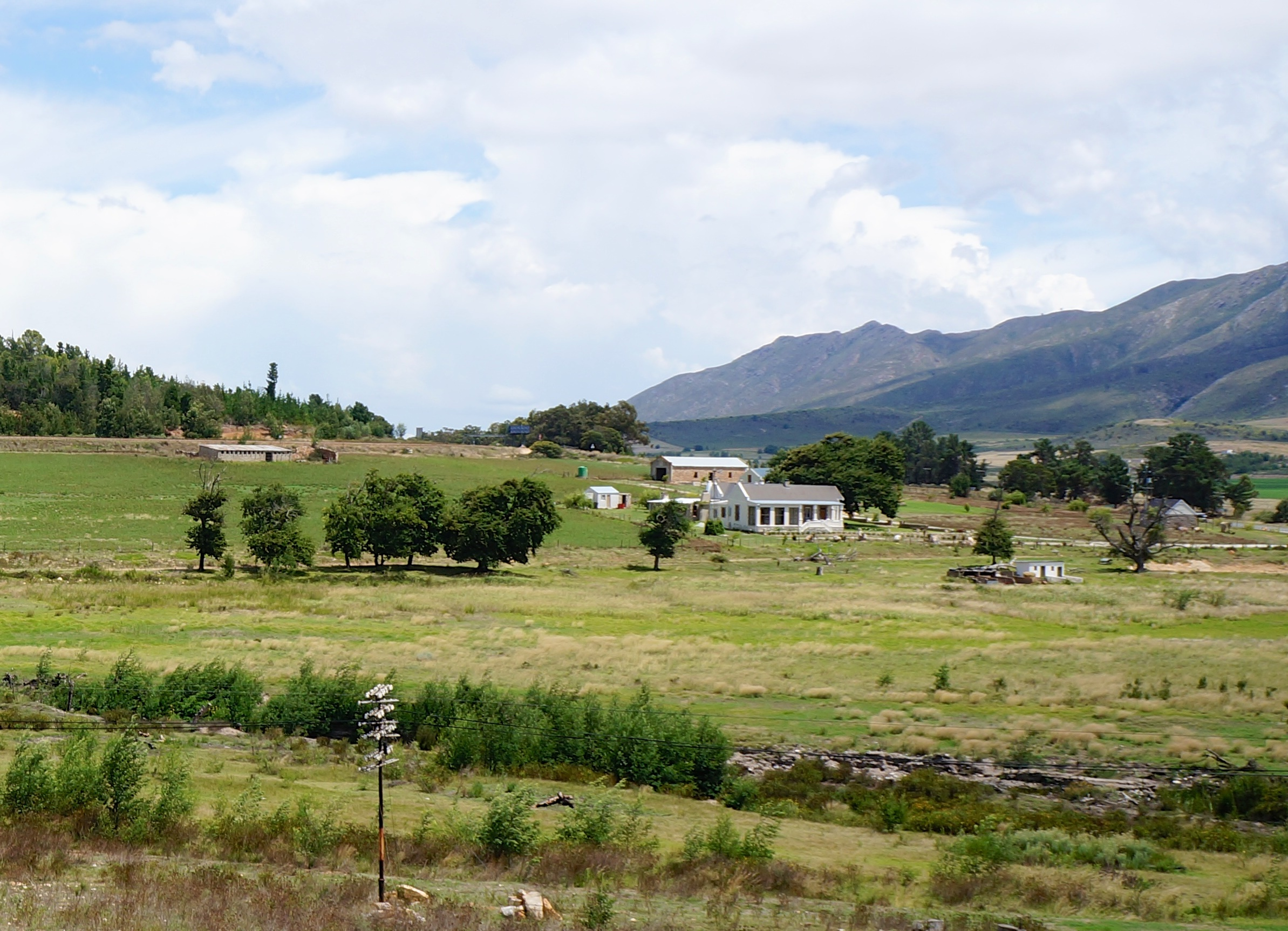

- Location within Western Cape Location within South Africa
- Coordinates: 33.833°S 22.45°E
- Country: South Africa
- Province: Western Cape
- District: Garden Route
- Municipality: George

Population
  - Total: 1,669
- Time zone: UTC+2 (SAST)
- PO box: 6615

Herold is a hamlet in George Municipality in the Western Cape province of South Africa. It is located at the northern end of Montagu Pass, halfway between George (city) and Oudtshoorn. Herold and Herolds Bay were both named for Tobias Johannes Herold, the Dutch Reformed minister at George from 1812 to 1823. The N9 national road runs to the north of the hamlet.

== School and church ==
In 1933 a local farmer donated land to the De Villiers congregation of the Dutch Reformed Mission Church. The local community then single-handedly established the United Reformed Church and the Franken Primary School on site. In 2020, the school had 330 learners that received instruction up to grade 9. In 2020 however, on the recommendation of consultants, Reverend David Elias announced that the school will be sold, a move to which many community members were opposed. The community also complained about actions which led to interruptions in the school's electricity, water and heat supply.

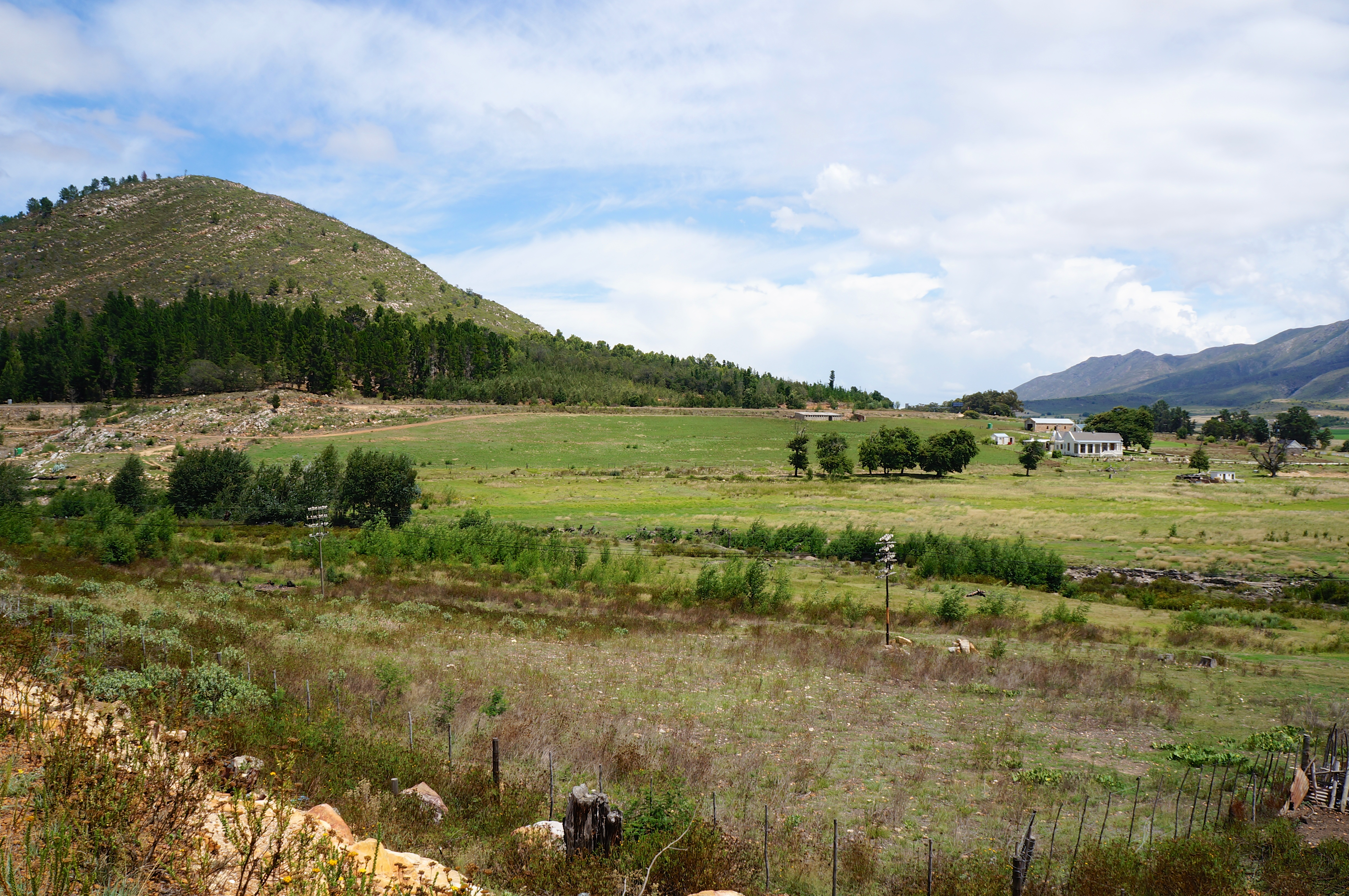

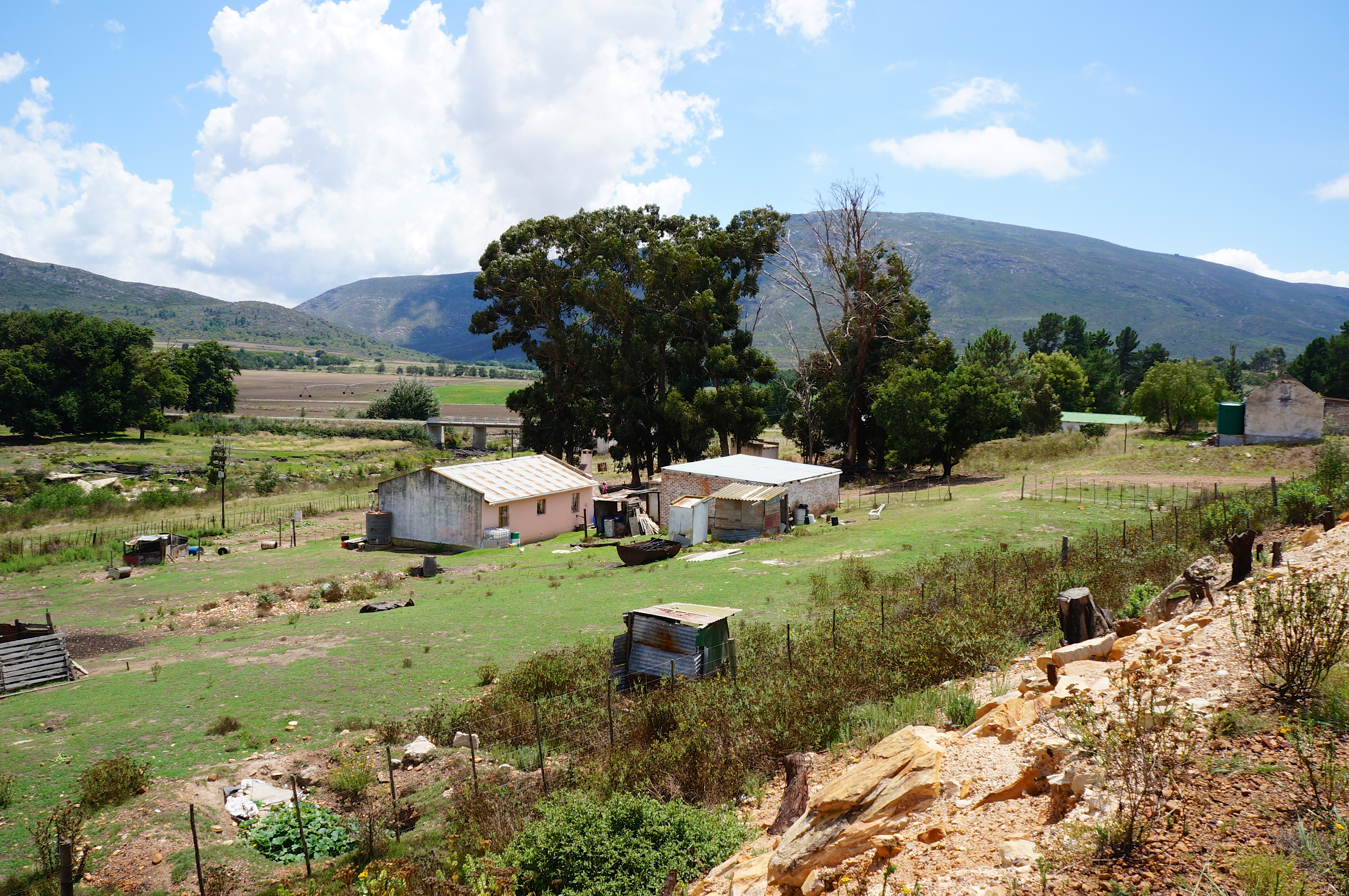
