= Montagu Pass =

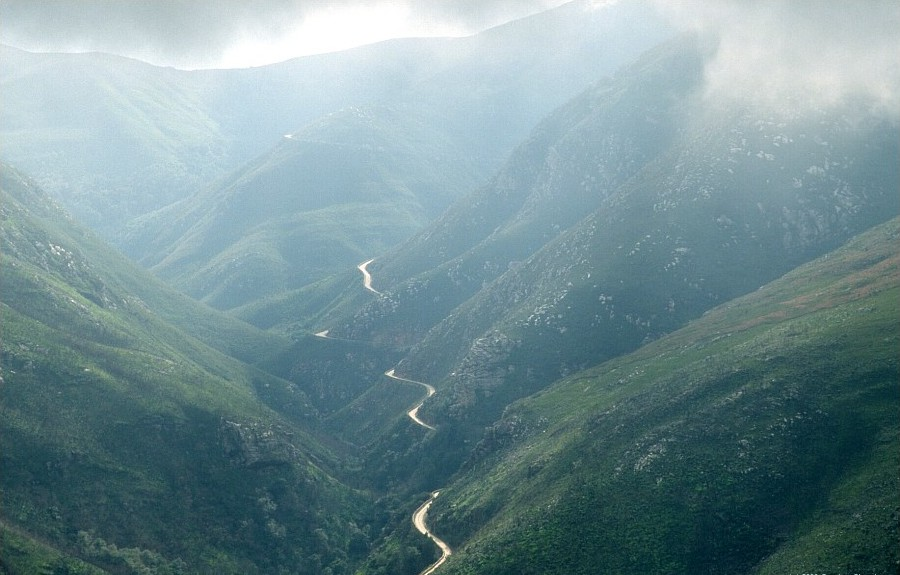

- Location within Western Cape
- Traversed by: N9/N12

Third Approach
- Location: Western Cape, South Africa
- Coordinates: 33°52′S 22°27′E

Montagu Pass is situated in the Western Cape province of South Africa, on the unsigned road between Herold and George. The all gravel pass parallels the newer Outeniqua Pass which is designated as the N9/N12. The pass was named after John Montagu, Colonial Secretary of the Cape in the 1840s, who formally opened the pass in 1847.

The pass was damaged by floods in November 1996, and was closed for most of 1997 for repairs. A driving time of about one hour will take one over the Outeniqua Mountains and through the village of Herold to the N9.

The pass was designated a provincial heritage site in 1972.

== Construction ==
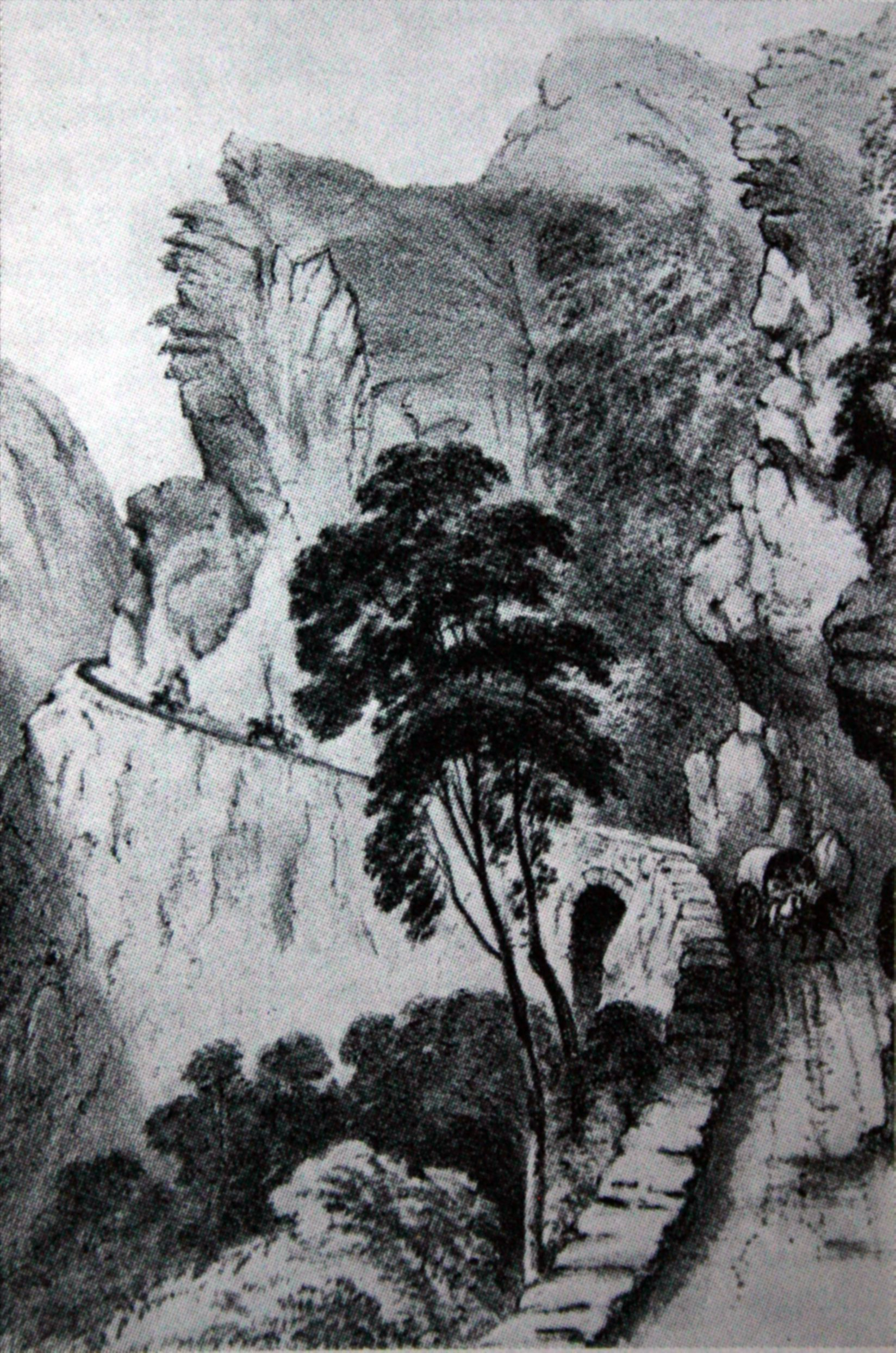
Watercolour of Montagu Pass in 1849, shortly after completion

In 1844, some 250 convicts started with the construction of the pass and it was opened for traffic in December 1847. The passage over the Outeniqua mountains, which used to take a full three days over the Cradock Pass, could now be accomplished within three hours. Today it takes 15 minutes by car.

Henry Fancourt White was the engineer in charge of the work. His name is perpetuated in the Fancourt Estate and in the village of Blanco (originally called White's Village). On the ascent, one passes the Old Tollhouse where once the toll of one penny per wheel and one penny per ox had to be paid. This historic building, declared a National Monument, is currently in a bad state having been vandalised. "Keurrivier se brug" further on has also been declared a National Monument. The original stone wall still exists all along the pass. The name boards tell interesting tales. The narrowest part of the pass with overhanging cliffs was called "Die Noute". Here wagons could not pass abreast. Further on is "Regop Trek", the steepest part of the road. Where the road passes underneath the railway bridge, is "Stinkhoutdraai" where stinkwood trees used to grow in profusion. In this way the pass continues, until reaching the hotel at North Station. The oldest part of the building dates back to 1840.

== The Old Toll House ==
This building is built of local stone and it is a proclaimed heritage site. The toll was 2 pence per wheel and one penny for each pulling animal, 2 pence for a horse, cow, ox or mule and 1 half a penny for a sheep, goat or pig.

The first toll keeper was John Kirk Smith who was born in Nottingham, England, in 1818.

== Gallery ==
Montagu Pass roadsign

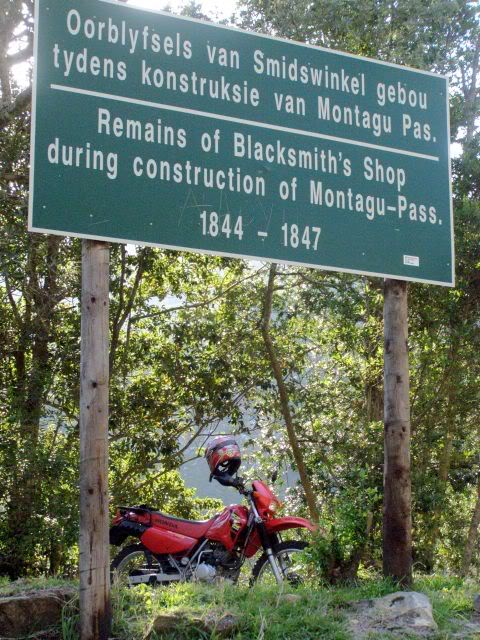
Remains of shop

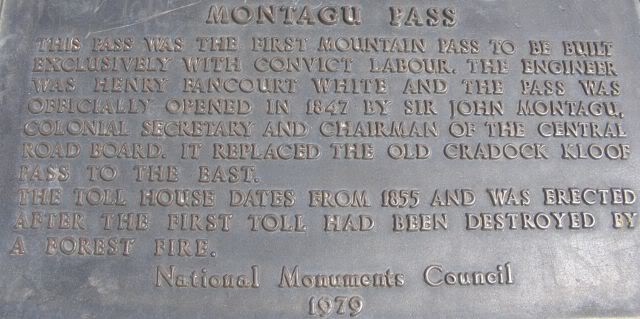
Convict plaque

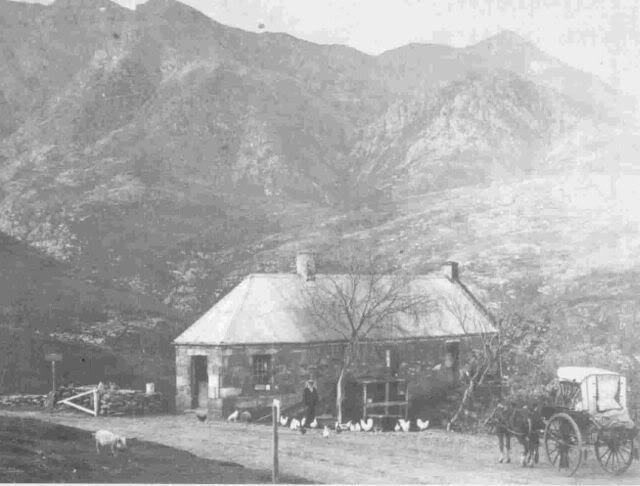
Old picture

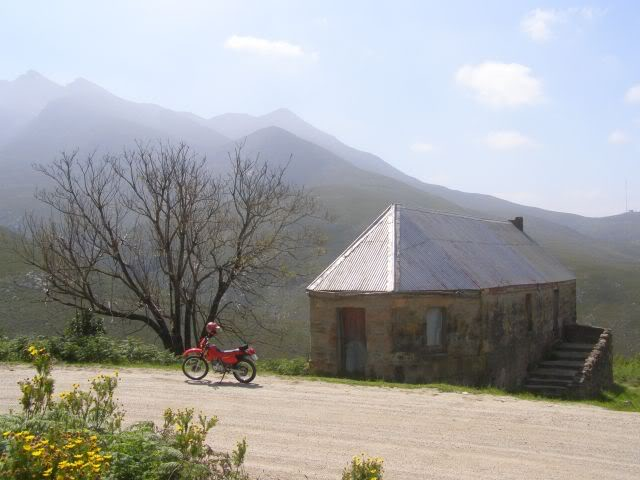
Recent picture
