= Perdepoort =

Mountain pass of South Africa

Coordinates: 33°11′19.8″S 23°25′53.0″E

Perdepoort Pass, Or just Perdepoort, is situated in the Eastern Cape, province, on the National road N9, between Willowmore and Graaff Reinet.

The mountain range it bridges has an elevation of 1.414 meter above sealevel.
