= R329 (South Africa) =

Regional route in South Africa

Regional route R329
- R329 route map

Route information
- Length: 137 km (85 mi)

Location
- Country: South Africa

Highway system
- Numbered routes of South Africa
← R328	→ R330

The R329 is a Regional Route in South Africa that connects Willowmore in the west with Wolwefontein (a railway siding) at the R75 (which continues on to Uitenhage).

== Route ==
The route's western origin starts just north of Willowmore, from the N9. It heads east, along the northern edge of the Baviaanskloof, and, after about 30 kilometers gives off the R337 heading north-east. The route continues for another 60 kilometers to reach Steytlerville. After another 30 kilometer of easterly travel the route reaches the southern terminus of the R338 and ends 25 kilometers later at the R75.
