= John Phillip Harison Acocks =

South African botanist

- Born: 7 April 1911; Cape Town, South Africa
- Died: 20 May 1979 (aged 68); Middelburg, South Africa
- Scientific career
- Fields: Botany

John Phillip Harison Acocks (7 April 1911 – 20 May 1979) was a South African botanist noted for his publication "Veld Types of South Africa" and his extensive botanical collection of some 28 000 specimens from South Africa and Namibia. In 1938, he was seconded to go on a joint collecting trip of four months with Swedish botanist Adolf Hjalmar Frederick Hafström between Cape Town and Victoria Falls.

== Early life and education ==
He was born in Cape Town to John Martin Acocks and Sarah Phoebe Petty. Matriculated from the South African College Schools (SACS) and attended the University of Cape Town between 1929 and 1935 obtaining a B.A. and M.Sc. He studied under Robert Stephen Adamson (1885–1965) and Margaret Levyns (1890–1975).

== Career ==
His first appointment was in January 1936 as pasture ecologist at the Pasture Research Section, part of the Division of Plant Industry. He set out to do botanical surveys of new pasture research stations. In 1945, he was transferred to Estcourt to the Botanical Survey Section of the Division of Botany and Plant Pathology which later became the Botanical Research Institute. From 1948, he was permanently posted at the Grootfontein College of Agriculture in Middelburg.

Acocks contributed greatly to South African botany in three distinct areas. Firstly, his treatment of the vegetation regions (Veld Types) of South Africa, in which he classifies vegetation into 75 classes, continues to be a valuable reference work for researchers and is an outstanding achievement for a single individual. Secondly, his analysis of the impact of humans on vegetation has largely been revised by current research insights, specifically with regard to the effect of fire on grasslands, savannas and forests. There is, though, ample evidence showing considerable changes in Karoo fauna and flora over the last three centuries. Finally, his pioneering views on veld rehabilitation and management remain important guidelines for the farming communities of South Africa.

He was President of Section C of the SA Assoc. for the Advancement of Science in 1963, and awarded the Senior Capt. Scott Medal by the SA Biol. Soc. in 1977.

Acocks worked on a revised version of the Veld Types, which he completed shortly before his death, and which is lodged in the archives of the National Botanical Institute (NBG). His second book, Key Grasses of South Africa, was published in 1990.

== Legacy ==
Acocks is commemorated by many specific names including Cliffortia acocksii H.Weim., Erica acocksii Compton, Restio acocksii Pillans and Diospyros acocksii De Wint. His specimens are housed at BM, BOL, Cedara College of Agriculture, Dohne Agricultural Development Institute, GRA, Grootfontein Agricultural College, K, KMG, M, MO, NH, NU, P, PRE, PREM, S, STE(NBG), Toowoomba Agricultural Development Centre.

== Bibliography ==
- Veld Types of South Africa (with accompanying Veld Type Map) – John Phillip Harison Acocks ISBN 0-621-02256-X ISBN 9780621022568 (Botanical Research Institute, 1975)
- Acock's Notes: Key Grasses of South Africa – (Grassland Society of South Africa, 1990) ISBN 0-620-14282-0
