= Buyspoort =

Mountain pass in South Africa

Coordinates: 33°20′59.6″S 23°26′04.0″E

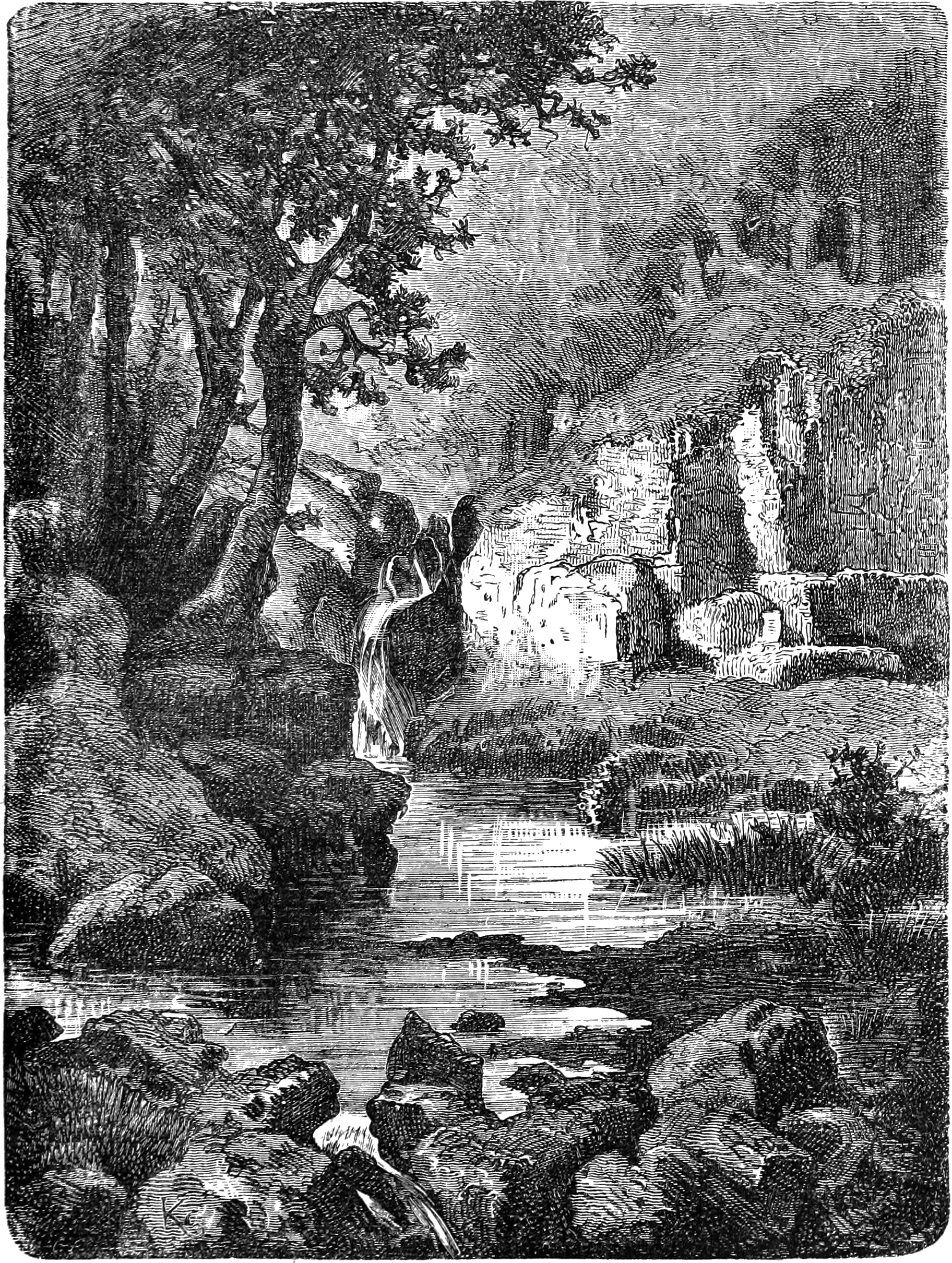
Buyspoort, 1881

Buyspoort Pass, (also spelled Buispoort) is a mountain pass located in the Eastern Cape province of South Africa on the N9 national route between Uniondale and Willowmore. Its name derives from the surname Buys and poort, the Afrikaans word for gate.
