= Voëlklip =

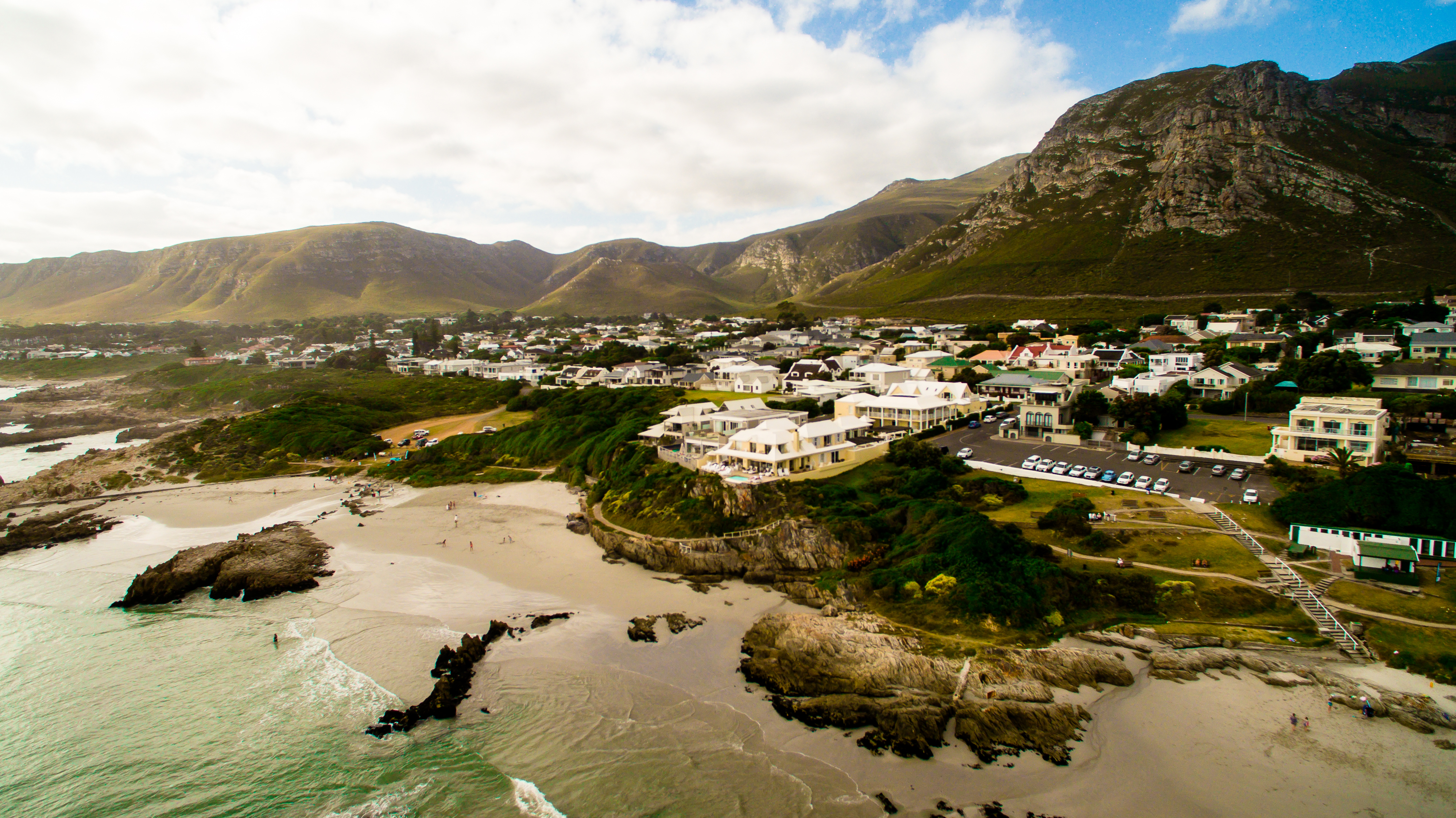
- Voëlklip, with Voëlklip Beach in foreground

- Location within Western Cape Location within South Africa
- Coordinates: 34°24′S 19°16′E
- Country: South Africa
- Province: Western Cape
- District: Overberg
- Municipality: Overstrand

Area
  - Total: 2.84 km^{2} (1.10 sq mi)
- Elevation: 7.5 m (25 ft)

Population (2011)
  - Total: 1,156
  - Density: 407/km^{2} (1,050/sq mi)
- Time zone: UTC+2 (SAST)

Voëlklip, Western Cape is a settlement, a suburb of Hermanus, in Overberg District Municipality in the Western Cape province of South Africa.
