= Outeniqua Pass =

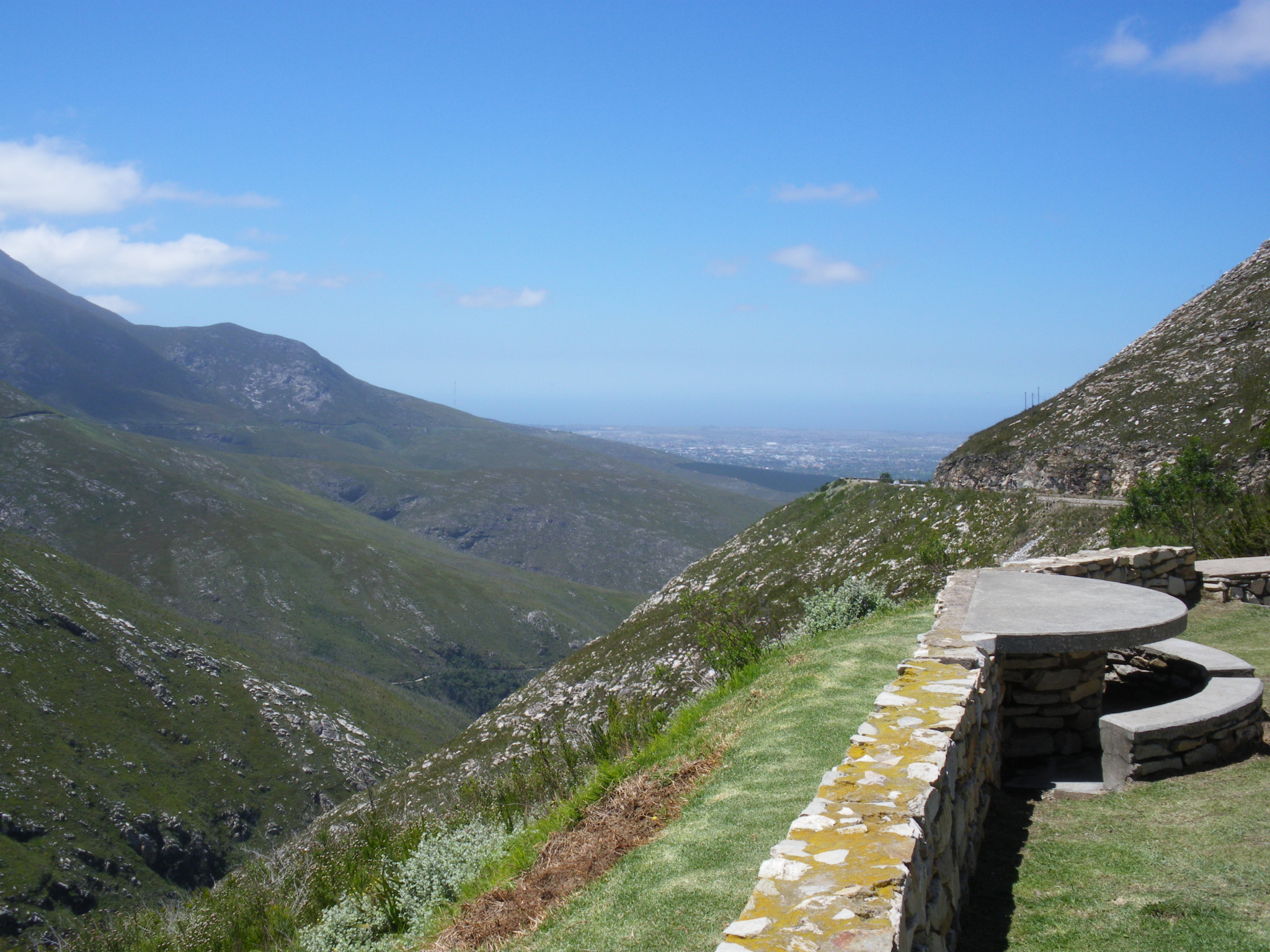
- View from the Outeniqua Pass towards George

- Location within Western Cape
- Elevation: 800 metres (2,600 ft)
- Traversed by: N9/N12

Third Approach
- Location: Western Cape, South Africa
- Range: Outeniqua Mountains
- Coordinates: 33°53′11″S 22°23′57″E
- Topo map: 3322CD

The Outeniqua Pass is a mountain pass in the Western Cape, South Africa, that carries the N9/N12 national road through the Outeniqua Mountains north of George. It connects George and the Garden Route coastal plain with Oudtshoorn and the Little Karoo. It was constructed between 1943 and 1951, replacing the Montagu Pass as the main route from George to the interior.

== History ==
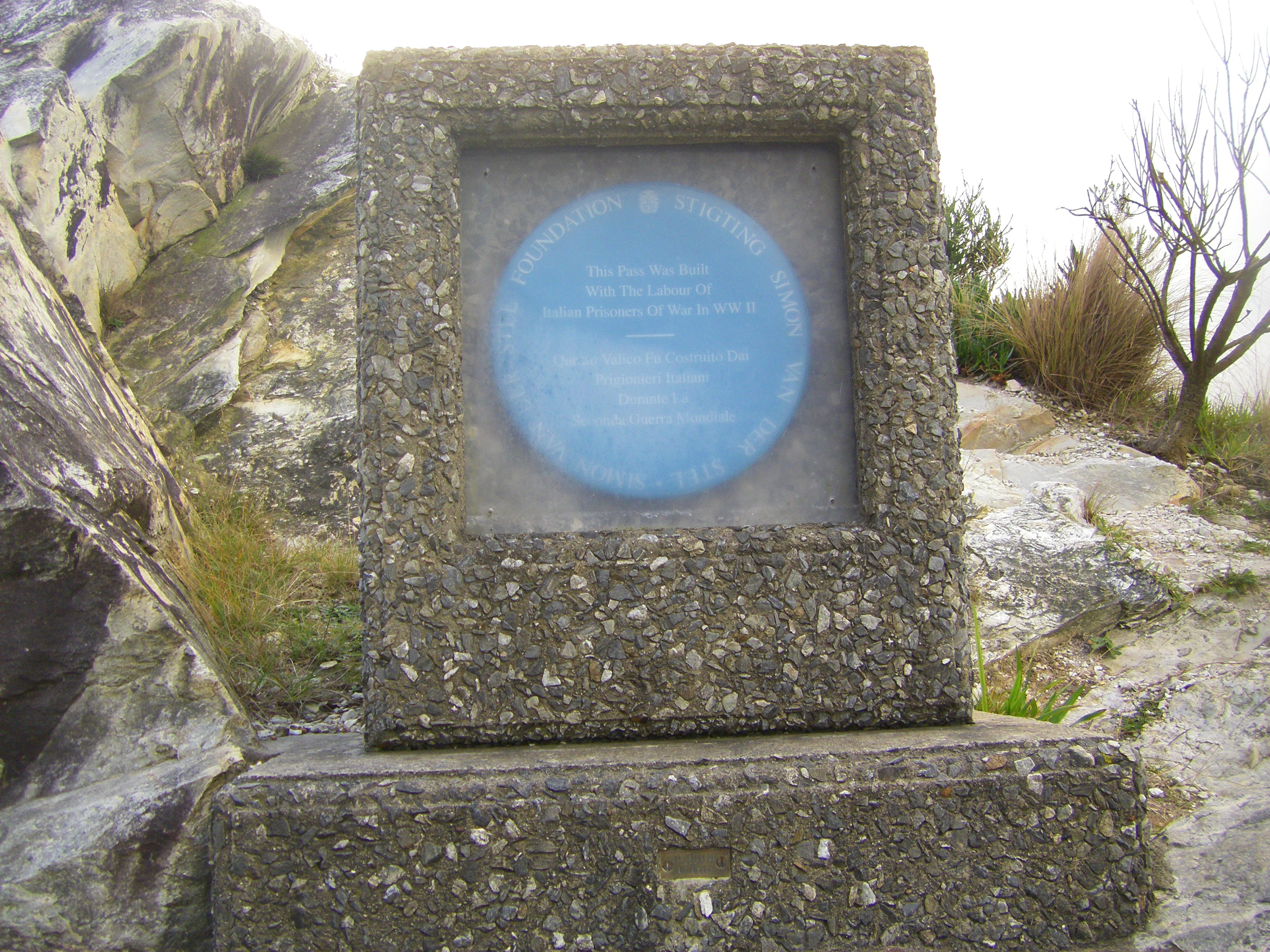
Memorial commemorating the Italian prisoners of war who contributed to the construction of the Quteniqua Pass.

Construction of the pass commenced during the Second World War. Between 1942 and 1945, approximately 500 Italian prisoners of war were employed aspart of the labour force to construct the pass under the supervision of the National Road Board. Following the end of the war, the prisoners were repatriated to Italy and construction was completed by local workers. A memorial plaque on the pass commemorates the contribution of the Italian prisoners of war.
