= George Airport =

George Airport George Lughawe
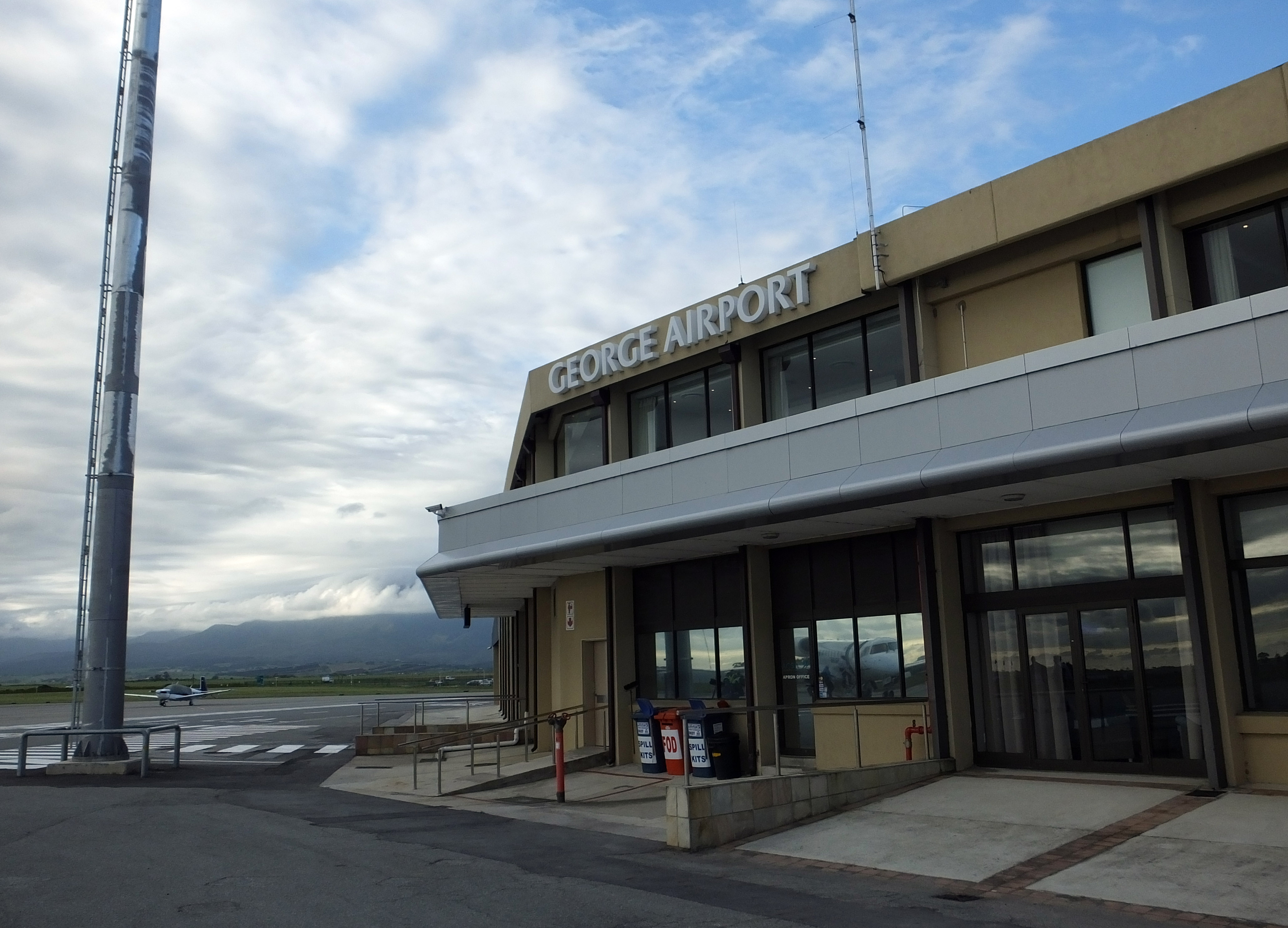
- IATA: GRJ; ICAO: FAGG

Summary
- Airport type: Public
- Operator: Airports Company South Africa
- Serves: George, Garden Route District Municipality, South Africa
- Opened: 1977
- Hub for: FlySafair; CemAir; Airlink
- Elevation AMSL: 195 m (640 ft)
- Coordinates: 34°00′24″S 22°22′51″E
- Website: https://www.airports.co.za/airports/george-airport

Maps
- Interactive Map
- Location in the Western Cape GRJ (South Africa) GRJ (Africa)

Runways
Direction	Length		Surface
Direction	m	ft	Surface
11/29	2,000	6,561	Asphalt
~~02/20~~	~~1,220~~	~~4,002~~	~~Asphalt~~

Statistics (FY2025–26)
- Passenger traffic: 939,332
- Aircraft movements: 26,810
- Source: Airports Company South Africa

George Airport (IATA: GRJ, ICAO: FAGG) (Afrikaans: George Lughawe) is an airport located in George, Western Cape, South Africa. It was formerly known as P. W. Botha Airport, named after the state president who lived in this part of the country.

The airport was originally built in 1977 as an exact replica of the Keetmanshoop Airport in Namibia, but since its expansion and renovation, it now looks completely different. George Airport has won the award for Africa's best airport in the category under two million passengers per year six times; the last time was in 2017. The award is given by Airports Council International (ACI).

== Airlines and destinations ==
=== Passenger ===
Airlines	Destinations
CemAir	Durban, Hoedspruit, Johannesburg–O. R. Tambo
FlySafair	Johannesburg–Lanseria, Johannesburg–O. R. Tambo

=== Cargo ===
BidAir Cargo transports cargo between George Airport and O. R. Tambo International Airport at Johannesburg.

=== Destination map ===
George Airport (South Africa)
Destinations from GRJ.

== Traffic statistics ==
Annual passenger and aircraft statistics
Fiscal year (Apr–Mar)	Aircraft movements	Passenger traffic
2006–07	no data	589,674(▲4.2%)
2007–08	no data	652,031(▲10.6%)
2008–09	no data	630,385(▼3.3%)
2009–10	no data	548,498(▼13.0%)
2010–11	32,944	526,823(▼4.0%)
2011–12	33,479(▲1.6%)	565,291(▲7.3%)
2012–13	39,664(▲18.5%)	544,306(▼3.7%)
2013–14	43,758(▲10.3%)	572,130(▲5.1%)
2014–15	55,432(▲26.7%)	615,688(▲7.6%)
2015–16	57,924(▲4.5%)	718,881(▲16.8%)
2016–17	51,405(▼11.2%)	738,641(▲2.7%)
2017–18	32,961(▼35.9%)	801,480(▲8.5%)
2018–19	43,016(▲30.5%)	835,906(▲4.3%)
2019–20	36,202(▼15.8%)	830,118(▼0.7%)
2020–21	18,486(▼49.0%)	267,816(▼67.7%)
2021–22	20,276(▲9.7%)	609,069(▲127.4%)
2022–23	28,695(▲41.5%)	757,567(▲24.4%)
2023–24	29,265(▲2.0%)	803,184(▲6.0%)
2024–25	31,265(▲6.8%)	833,455(▲3.8%)
2025–26	26,810(▼14.3%)	939,332(▲12.7%)
Source: ACSA

== Accidents and incidents ==
- 7 December 2009 – An Embraer ERJ 135 (registration:ZS-SJW) operated by Airlink on a scheduled flight (SA-8625) overran the runway in wet conditions and ended up on a public road (the R404). There were no fatalities, but the plane suffered substantial damage. The accident was caused by an incorrect sealant used on the runway, and the airline was cleared of all blame. Airlink's insurers took legal action against the state-owned Airports Company of South Africa.

== See also ==
- List of airports in South Africa
- List of South African airports by passenger movements
