= Middelburg, Eastern Cape =

Middelburg
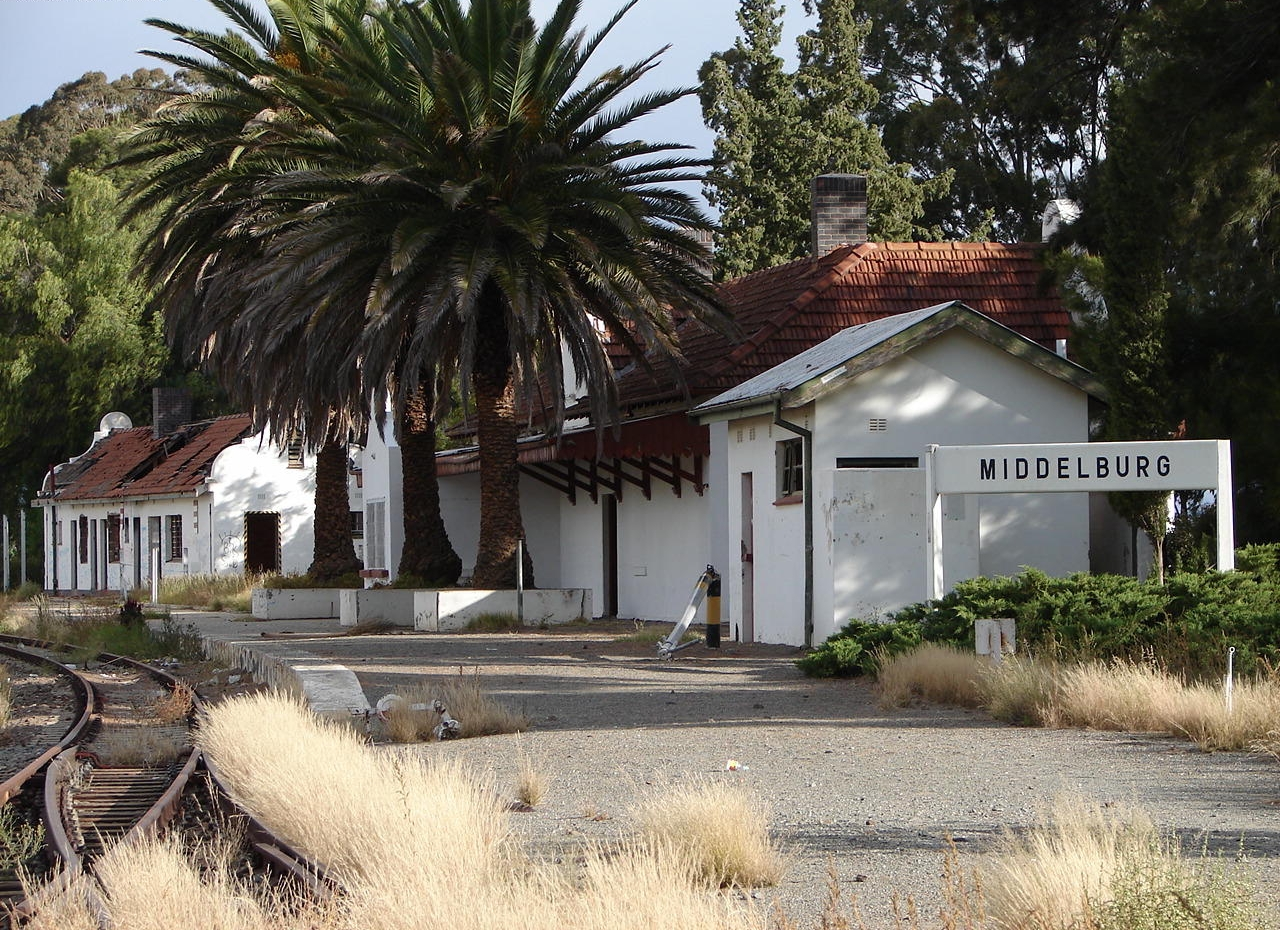
- Middelburg railway station

- Location within Eastern Cape Location within South Africa Location within Africa
- Coordinates: 31°29′38″S 25°1′2″E
- Country: South Africa
- Province: Eastern Cape
- District: Chris Hani
- Municipality: Inxuba Yethemba
- Established: 1852

Area
  - Total: 44.76 km^{2} (17.28 sq mi)

Population (2011)
  - Total: 18,681
  - Density: 417.4/km^{2} (1,081/sq mi)

Racial makeup (2011)
  - Black African: 49.2%
  - Coloured: 43.9%
  - Indian/Asian: 0.3%
  - White: 6.2%
  - Other: 0.4%

First languages (2011)
  - Afrikaans: 52.3%
  - Xhosa: 43.6%
  - English: 1.9%
  - Other: 2.2%
- Time zone: UTC+2 (SAST)
- Postal code (street): 5900
- PO box: 5900

Middelburg (Afrikaans pronunciation: [ˈmədəlbœrχ]) is a town in the Eastern Cape province of South Africa, in the Great Karoo. It lies in the Upper Karoo, 1,279 m above sea level, with a population of 19,000. It falls under the Inxuba Yethemba Local Municipality, in the Chris Hani District Municipality.

== History ==
In 1837 the Cape Colony government proclaimed the district of Colesberg, and established the Town of Middelburg in 1852, so named since it is midway between Graaff-Reinet and Colesberg. It is also approximately halfway between Port Elizabeth and Bloemfontein.

The town and surrounding areas are rich in history from the Anglo Boer War. The adjacent Grootfontein College of Agriculture was established as a military camp and training centre for British troops. About 7,000 troops from the Third Manchester Regiment were stationed at Grootfontein - some of them were married, so about 3,000 women and children also lived at Grootfontein.

In 1910 the Union of South Africa took control of the farm after which the Grootfontein School of Agriculture was established in 1911. Today the college offers a two-year Certificate in Agriculture and a three-year Diploma in Agriculture, both accredited by the Higher Education Quality Committee.

The Cape Province branch of the National Party was constituted at a congress held in Middelburg on 15 September 1914, two months after the National Party's founding in Smithfield, Orange Free State Province. Over 300 delegates attended the meeting that would also choose Dr D.F. Malan, later Prime Minister of South Africa, as the provincial party's first chairman.

The R56, the shortest route between the Northern Cape and KwaZulu-Natal begins at Middelburg. The town's hospital is Wilhelm Stahl Provincial Hospital.

== Notable people ==
Jozua François Naudé, Pastor in the Dutch Reformed Church, was born in Middelburg EC in 1873. Middelburg is also the birthplace of playwright Athol Fugard. Other well known South Africans who were born or lived in Middelburg include Eddie Stuart (Footballer), Steven Sykes (Rugby player), Keanu Vers (Rugby Player), Arthur Lennox Ochse (Cricketer), John James Clements (recipient of the Victoria Cross), Eric Rosenthal (historian and author), Cecily Norden (Horse industry), John Phillip Harison Acocks (botanist), Colin Turpin, Reader in Law at Clare College, Cambridge .

== Climate ==
Climate data for Middelburg, Eastern Cape
Month	Jan	Feb	Mar	Apr	May	Jun	Jul	Aug	Sep	Oct	Nov	Dec	Year
Mean daily maximum °C (°F)	30 (86)	28 (82)	26 (79)	22 (72)	18 (64)	15 (59)	16 (61)	18 (64)	22 (72)	24 (75)	26 (79)	29 (84)	22 (72)
Daily mean °C (°F)	21 (70)	20 (68)	18 (64)	14 (57)	11 (52)	8 (46)	8 (46)	10 (50)	13 (55)	15 (59)	18 (64)	20 (68)	14 (57)
Mean daily minimum °C (°F)	13 (55)	12 (54)	11 (52)	7 (45)	3 (37)	−4 (25)	−1 (30)	1 (34)	4 (39)	6 (43)	9 (48)	11 (52)	6 (43)
Average precipitation mm (inches)	44 (1.7)	56 (2.2)	60 (2.4)	31 (1.2)	16 (0.6)	10 (0.4)	11 (0.4)	12 (0.5)	15 (0.6)	26 (1.0)	38 (1.5)	37 (1.5)	356 (14.0)
Source: Weatherbase
