= Inxuba Yethemba Local Municipality =

Inxuba Yethemba
- Local municipality
- Seal

- Location in the Eastern Cape
- Coordinates: 32°11′S 25°37′E
- Country: South Africa
- Province: Eastern Cape
- District: Chris Hani
- Seat: Nxuba
- Wards: 9

Government
  - Type: Municipal council
  - Mayor: Raymond Zenzile Shweni (ANC)
  - Speaker: Maria Nortje (ANC)
  - Chief Whip: Thembisile Bobo (ANC)

Area
  - Total: 11,663 km^{2} (4,503 sq mi)

Population (2011)
  - Total: 65,560
  - Density: 5.621/km^{2} (14.56/sq mi)

Racial makeup (2011)
  - Black African: 56.2%
  - Coloured: 32.2%
  - Indian/Asian: 0.3%
  - White: 10.5%

First languages (2011)
  - Xhosa: 50.0%
  - Afrikaans: 44.6%
  - English: 3.1%
  - Other: 2.3%
- Time zone: UTC+2 (SAST)
- Municipal code: EC131

Inxuba Yethemba Municipality (Xhosa: uMasipala wase Inxuba Yethemba; Afrikaans: Inxuba Yethemba Munisipaliteit), formerly known as Cradock Municipality, is a local municipality within the Chris Hani District Municipality, in the Eastern Cape province of South Africa. The seat is Nxuba.

== Politics ==
The municipal council consists of eighteen members elected by mixed-member proportional representation. Nine councillors are elected by first-past-the-post voting in nine wards, while the remaining nine are chosen from party lists so that the total number of party representatives is proportional to the number of votes received. In the election of 1 November 2021 the African National Congress (ANC) won a majority of ten seats on the council.

The following table shows the results of the election.

Inxuba Yethemba local election, 1 November 2021
Party	Votes				Seats		
Party	Ward	List	Total	%	Ward	List	Total
African National Congress	7,519	7,665	15,184	53.0%	5	5	10
Democratic Alliance	5,707	5,645	11,352	39.7%	4	3	7
Patriotic Alliance	346	387	733	2.6%	0	1	1
Economic Freedom Fighters	329	398	727	2.5%	0	0	0
Freedom Front Plus	152	156	308	1.1%	0	0	0
Independent candidates	269	–	269	0.9%	0	–	0
African Transformation Movement	16	40	56	0.2%	0	0	0
Total	14,338	14,291	28,629		9	9	18
Valid votes	14,338	14,291	28,629	98.0%			
Spoilt votes	284	303	587	2.0%			
Total votes cast	14,622	14,594	29,216				
Voter turnout	14,639						
Registered voters	29,691						
Turnout percentage	49.3%						

== Main places ==
The 2001 census divided the municipality into the following main places:

Place	Code	Area (km^{2})	Population
Cradock	21801	123.99	12,327
KwaNonzame	21803	2.75	5,591
Lingelihle	21804	4.92	18,966
Middelburg	21805	160.10	12,523
Remainder of the municipality	21802	11,302.89	10,891
