= Klipplaat =

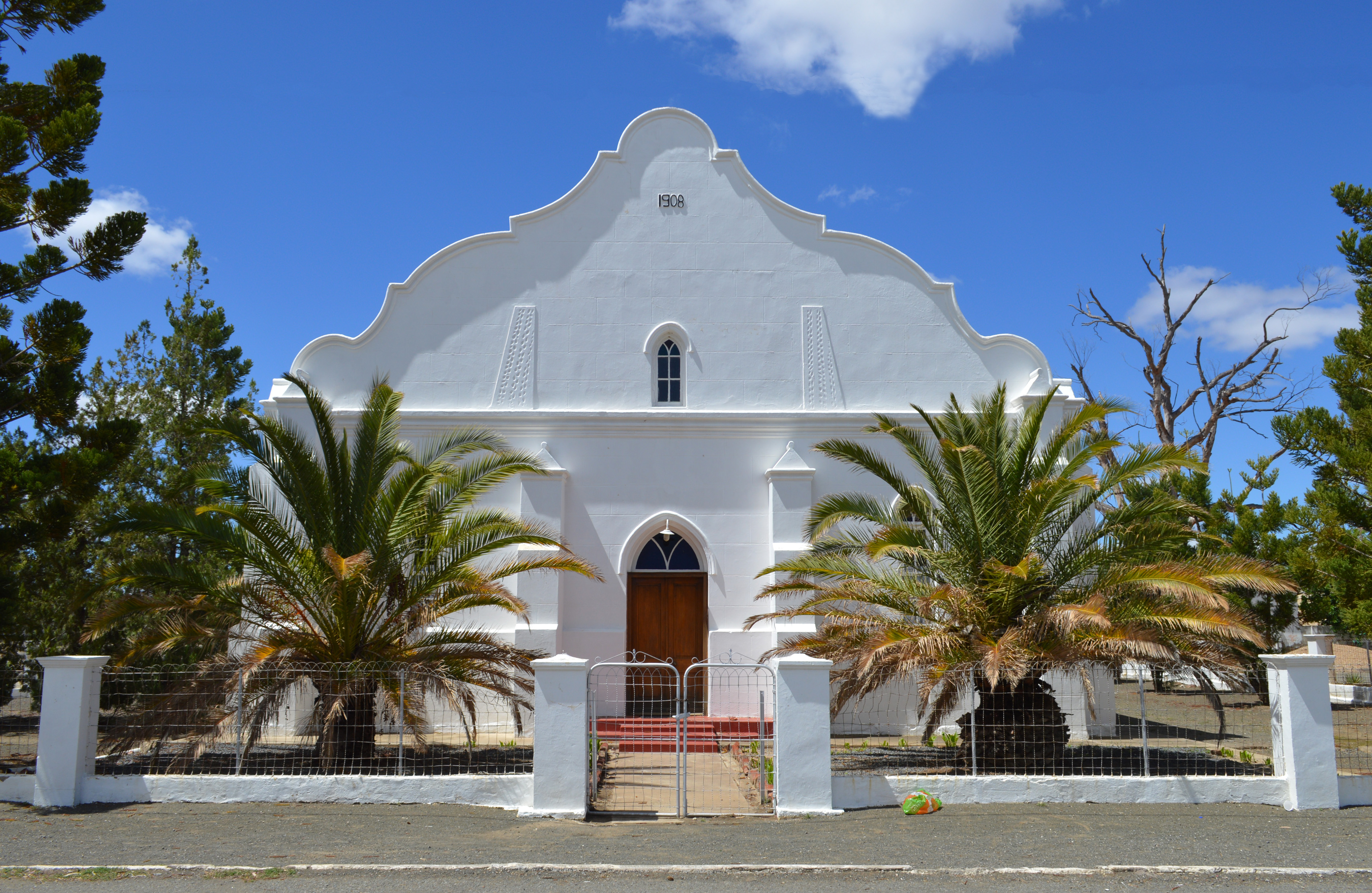
- Dutch Reformed Church in Klipplaat

- Location of Klipplaat in the Eastern Cape Klipplaat (South Africa)
- Coordinates: 33.018°S 24.340°E
- Country: South Africa
- Province: Eastern Cape
- District: Sarah Baartman
- Municipality: Dr Beyers Naudé
- Established: 1883

Area
  - Total: 12.9 km^{2} (5.0 sq mi)

Population (2011)
  - Total: 2,967
  - Density: 230/km^{2} (596/sq mi)

Racial makeup (2011)
  - Black African: 36.7%
  - Coloured: 61.3%
  - Indian/Asian: 0.4%
  - White: 1.1%
  - Other: 0.6%

First languages (2011)
  - Afrikaans: 67.7%
  - Xhosa: 27.3%
  - English: 2.5%
  - Other: 2.5%
- Time zone: UTC+2 (SAST)
- Postal code (street): 6255
- PO box: 6255
- Area code: 049

Klipplaat is a small town in the Sarah Baartman District Municipality in the Eastern Cape province of South Africa. The town is some 185 km north-west of Port Elizabeth and 75 km south-east of Aberdeen.

== History ==
Klipplaat was established in 1883. The town gets its name from the rocky landscape around it. In Afrikaans, "klip" means "stone" or "rock", and "plaat" means "sheet" or "slab".

The first train arrived in 1879 and the town grew as a railway junction between Port Elizabeth and Graaff-Reinet, transporting agricultural products such as wool and mohair.

During the Second Boer War, the town served as a British military supply point. Trains carried soldiers and supplies through the town, despite Boer commandos attempting to disrupt the railway operations.

In 1947, King George VI, Queen Elizabeth, Princess Elizabeth and Princess Margaret stopped in Klipplaat during their railway tour of South Africa.

From 1979, the town started to decline as diesel trains replaced steam locomotives and more goods were transported by road. Railway services were gradually reduced, people moved away, and the local economy became weaker. The railway line to Graaff-Reinet closed in 2001.
