= Outeniqua Mountains =

Mountain range in South Africa

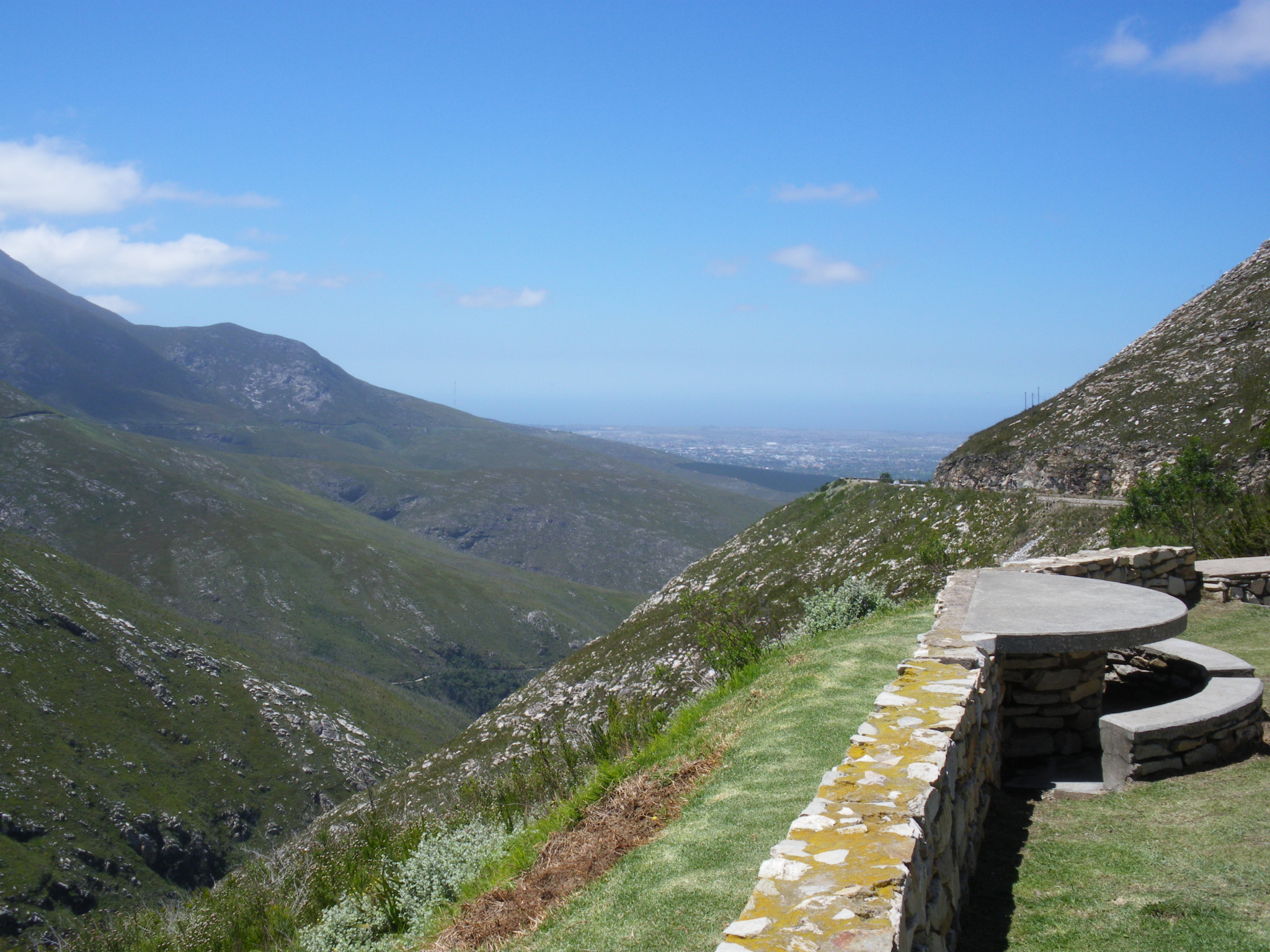
- Outeniqua Pass

Highest point
- Peak: Cradock Peak
- Elevation: 1,578 m (5,177 ft)
- Coordinates: 33°45′0″S 23°0′00″E

Geography
- Location within South Africa
- Country: South Africa
- Province: Western Cape

The Outeniqua Mountains, named after the Outeniqua Khoikhoi who lived there, is a mountain range that runs a parallel to the southern coast of South Africa, and forms a continuous range with the Langeberg to the west and the Tsitsikamma Mountains to the east. It was known as Serra de Estrella (Mountain of the Star) to the Portuguese. The mountains are part of the Garden Route of South Africa.

== Nomenclature ==
The term "Outeniqua", from the Khwemãna(!Kora) term ǂGoatanikua, is said to be derived from a Khwemãna-speaking clan that once lived in these mountains. This terms means "they who bear honey". Indigenous rock paintings can still be found in the area.

== History ==
Khoekhoe and !Kwingkia speaking people inhabited the mountains before the arrival of Europeans in the 1600s. The rugged mountains have long posed a barrier to the Klein Karoo and early settlers in the late 1600s used to follow herds of elephants to find easier ways through the area.

The region was first explored by white settlers in 1668. In 1782 French explorer ornithologist François Levaillant explored the area, and discovered farmers had settled at the foot of the mountain range.

=== Historic incidents ===
On 1 June 2002, former South Africa cricket captain Hansie Cronje's scheduled flight home from Johannesburg to George, Western Cape was grounded so he hitched a ride as the only passenger on board a Hawker Siddeley HS 748 turboprop aircraft. Near George Airport, the pilots lost visibility in clouds and were unable to land, partly due to unusable navigational equipment. While circling, the plane crashed into the Outeniqua mountains northeast of the airport. Cronje, aged 32, and the two pilots were killed instantly.

== Geography ==
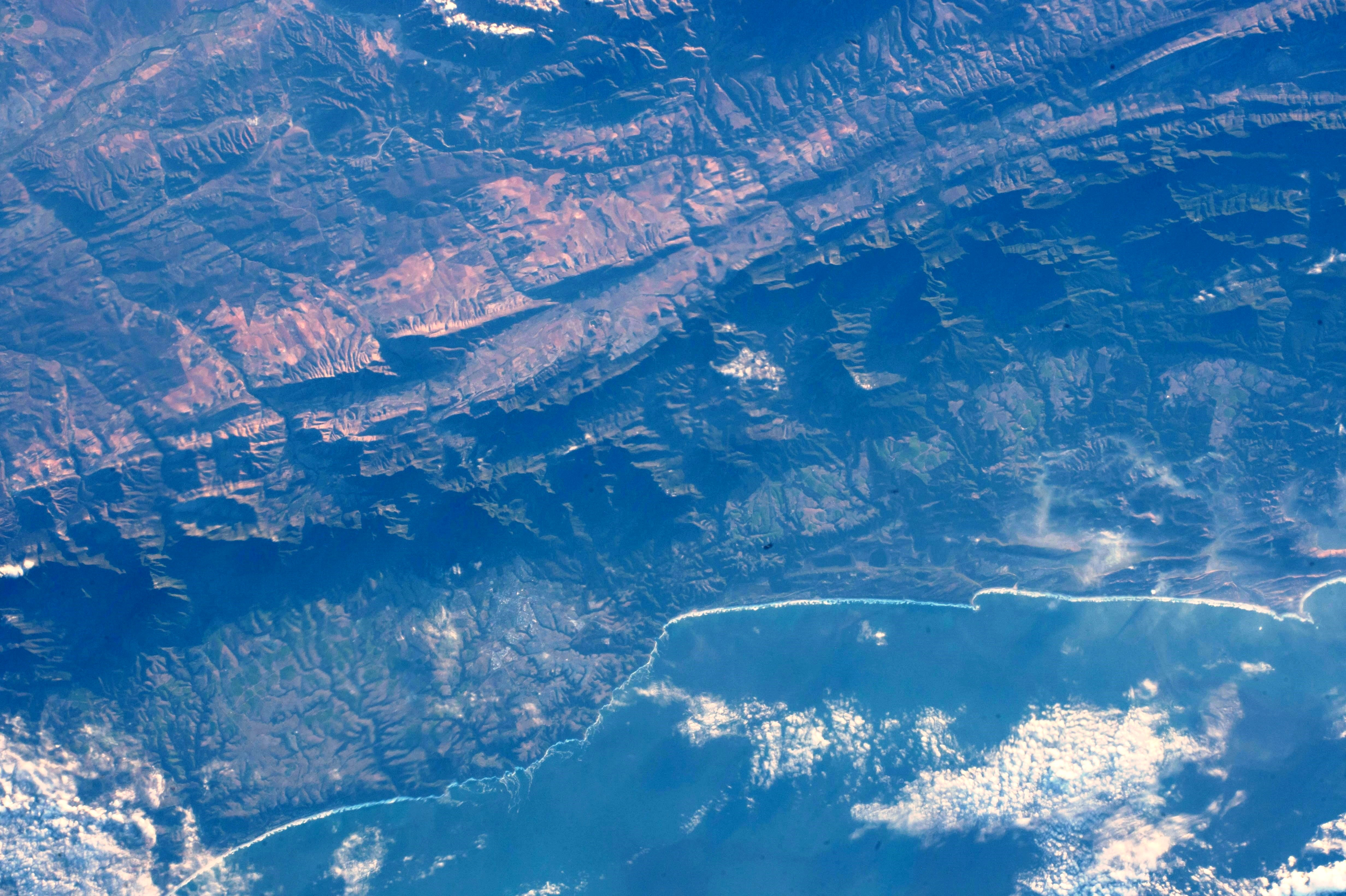
The central part of the range, seen from space

The range is characterized by gentle southern slopes and steep drops on the north side down to the low valley Little Karoo. High points include Cradock Peak at 1578 m and George Peak at 1370 m located to the north of George. The varying conditions create diverse habitats. On the south-facing slopes there is montane fynbos at higher, moister altitudes, while the north hosts karroid and renosterveld shrubland. On the mesic southern slopes there are Afromontane gallery forests.

== Weather ==
The high rainfall on the range has created numerous perennial streams used for irrigation in the Olifants River valley. While the climate along the range is generally hot to moderate, with an average summer temperature of 20.5 °C, weather conditions can vary greatly. In winter the temperature can drop to 5 °C (and even lower on the southern slopes) and snowfalls may occur on the higher peaks.

== Fauna and flora ==
Among the animals found in the Outeniqua range are klipspringer, grey rhebuck, leopard and various rodents. Up to the early 21st century, the Outeniqua mountain range was home to a very small number of African elephants, which however is now considered functionally extinct. New sightings of these very elusive animals continued into the 21st century, including that of a young bull, which gave hope that the fabled animals could become re-established in the Garden Route National Park. By 2019 however, it was clear that only a lone female had survived. Birds include black eagles and other raptors, besides the Knysna turaco, emerald cuckoo, Cape sugarbird and other fynbos birds.

== Passes ==
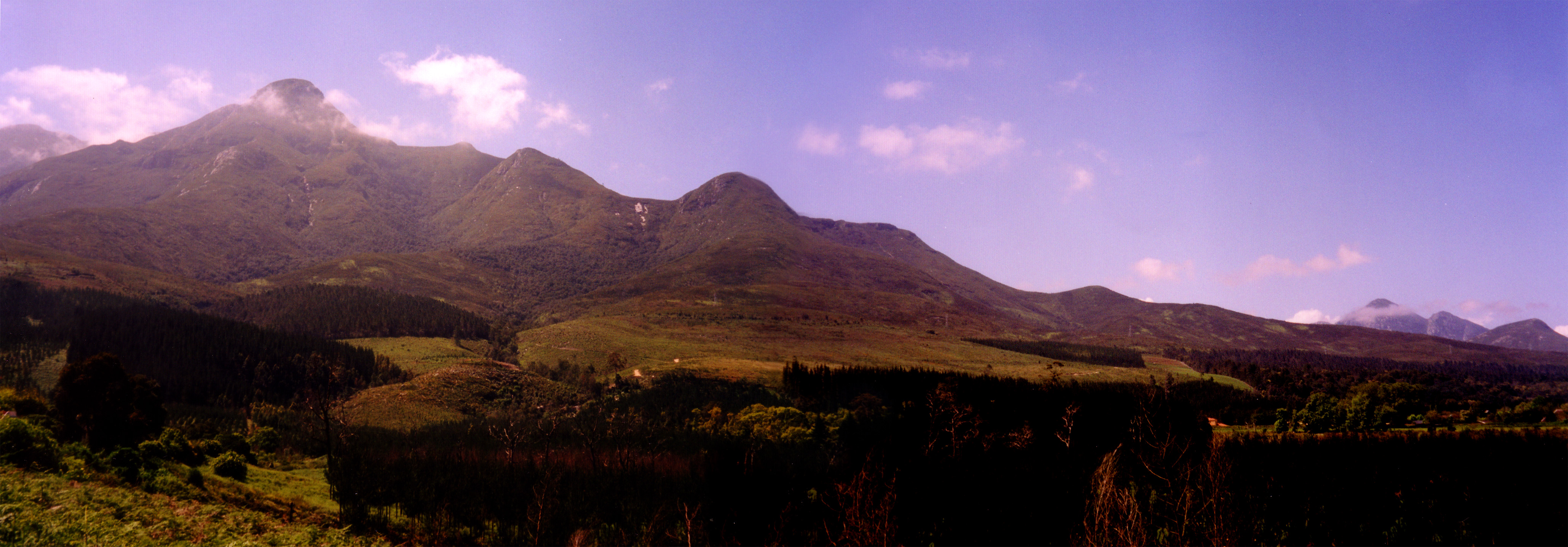
Outeniqua Mountains north of George

In 1908, work started on a railway route over the range from George to Oudtshoorn. This required the building of seven tunnels and numerous long cuttings. The line was opened in August 1913.

The first road pass to cross the range into the Langkloof went via Duiwelskop, some 32 km east of George.

In 1816, Cradock Pass, named after the Governor, Sir John Cradock, finished construction, and became known as the "Voortrekker Road". It had a difficult reputation. As early as 1831, Magistrate George van der Riet had inspected the road and found it to be a "complete bar" for all trade activities, and it had been characterised over time variously as "the most formidably bad, if not of all roads I ever saw", a "stupendous mountain" and "dangerous and very bad".

In 1847, a vastly improved Montagu Pass was constructed by convict labour, and named after the Colonial Secretary, John Montagu. In 1943, to cope with the increasing demands of modern traffic, construction was started on the Outeniqua Pass, using the labour of Italian prisoners of war. At the end of World War II the Italians returned home with the greater part of the pass unfinished. The pass was opened to traffic in September 1951, having cost approximately £500 000.

Two other road passes cross the Outeniqua: the Robinson Pass west of George; and Prince Alfred's Pass, which connects Uniondale with Knysna.

== See also ==
- Nature's Valley
