= Matthew Goniwe =

South African anti-apartheid activist, and one of The Cradock Four

Personal details
- Born: 26 December 1946 Cradock, Cape Province; Union of South Africa
- Died: 27 June 1985 (aged 38) Bluewater Bay, Port Elizabeth, South Africa
- Party: United Democratic Front, South African Communist Party, African National Congress
- Spouse: Nyameka Goniwe
- Relations: Mbulelo Goniwe (nephew)
- Children: Nobuzwe and Nyaniso
- Education: University of Fort Hare
- Occupation: Teacher

Matthew Goniwe OLS (27 December 1947 – 27 June 1985) was a South African anti-apartheid activist and one of The Cradock Four murdered by the South African Police in 1985.

== Early years ==
Goniwe was the youngest of eight children. His parents, David and Elizabeth Goniwe, were farm labourers and lived in the Emaqgubeni section of the old Cradock, Eastern Cape township. His family later moved to Lingelihle Township in 1962 as Emaqgumeni was demolished through the Group Areas Act.

== Education ==
Goniwe attended St James' Primary School and Sam Xhallie Secondary School, where he obtained his Junior Certificate. He obtained a teachers' diploma from University of Fort Hare and returned to Sam Xhallie School to teach mathematics and science. In 1958, he joined the African National Congress and in 1960, while in the process of completing his primary school, he joined the local communist party. He attended underground political classes of the ANC and the South African Communist Party. He was introduced into politics by his older brother Jamani Jacques Goniwe. During this time, he also joined a local boxing club and became a member of the Cradock Male Voice Choir. From 1961 to 1963, he completed part of his high schooling at Cradock Bantu Secondary. From 1964 until 1965, he completed his matric standard at Healdtown College near Fort Beaufort and became a member of the Moral Regeneration Movement (an organisation aimed at instilling morality amongst young people) and of the Healdtown Church Choir. Goniwe went to further his studies at Fort Hare University where he obtained a teacher’s diploma, majoring in mathematics, education, physics, and chemistry.

== Work ==
Goniwe obtained his first teaching post at Cradock Bantu Secondary where he taught mathematics and science. In 1972, he left his job to pursue a Bachelor of Science Degree at Fort Hare but was told that spaces were reserved for students straight from high school. He then taught briefly at Sithebe Secondary School. In 1973, he joined Holomisa High School at Mqanduli in Bityi Village. The school was situated in a dilapidated church building which he helped to renovate. He then established a feeding scheme, school choir, debating society and boxing, rugby and soccer clubs. In 1975, he married Nyameka who later qualified as a social worker. They had two children, Nobuzwe and Nyaniso.

== Activism ==
Goniwe’s political views were influenced by Reverend Canon James Calata, a founding member and former secretary of the South African Native National Congress. Goniwe established a Marxist cell which was a reading group which studied Marxism and Communism, together with Dumisa and Lungisile Ntsebeza, Meluxolo Silinga and Michael Mgodolozi. They established Marxist cells in educational institutions such as the University of Fort Hare and in towns such including Mqanduli, Mthatha, Whittlesea and King William's Town. In 1975, Dumisa, Ntsebeza, Silinga, and Mgodolozi were arrested after one member of the group gave the police information about their underground work. Goniwe was arrested on 19 July 1976. They were charged under the Suppression of Communism Act No 44 of 1950 which banned the South African Communist Party, and gave the government the power to ban publications that promoted the objectives of communism. They were detained at Wellington Maximum Prison until the conclusion of their trial. They were sentenced to four years in Mthatha prison except Mgodolozi who received a suspended sentence. While in jail, he studied and obtained a Bachelor of Arts Degree through the University of South Africa, majoring in political science and education.

Goniwe was released from prison in October 1981. He then moved on to become the head of department for science and mathematics at Nqweba High in Graaf-Reinet. In 1983, he was appointed principal at Sam Xhali Secondary in Lingelihle. That same year, the Cradock Youth Association (CRADOYA) was launched and Goniwe became its first Chairperson and Fort Calata, a friend and colleague, became the secretary. Their first protest was directed at the rental systems that were proposed by the Eastern Cape Administration Board. In 1983 Goniwe organised a mass meeting with Cradock residents to discuss how the community should respond to high rents. They formed the Cradock Residents Association and elected Goniwe its first chairperson. The organisation pressured the Eastern Cape Administration Board and rents were lowered. After the formation of the United Democratic Front on 20 August 1983, CRADORA became one of its affiliates. He also started underground political activities at the request of the exiled ANC. Under the UDF, he was in the forefront of fighting high rents, apartheid local government structures (black local authorities), and the Tricameral Parliament and their elections. He led CRADORA to the formation of street committees and area committees and this became known as the Goniwe Plan (G-Plan) which was adopted by the UDF nationally. In 1983, the Department of Education and Training (DET) tried to transfer him to Graaff-Reinet. The security police were wary of Goniwe and his influence as a principal at Nqweba High. Goniwe refused the transfer and was fired. The community rose up in support of him, organising school boycotts which eventually lasted fifteen months and which spread to a number of schools beyond Cradock. Goniwe was appointed a rural organiser for the UDF in March 1984 which resulted in permanent surveillance by the security police. After CRADOYA, meetings were banned and the community responded by rioting, which was put down by the police. On 30 March 1984, Goniwe, Fort Calata, Madoda Jacobs and Mbulelo Goniwe were detained on the suspicion that they were instigators of the school boycott which directly and indirectly led to further school boycotts within many communities in South Africa. Louis le Grange was Minister of Law and Order at the time and banned all meetings for three months, leading to further riots breaking out. While in detention, he was dismissed from his teaching post. Goniwe was released to a rapturous welcome on 10 October 1984 and called for a "Black Christmas", extending the boycott of white-owned shops. He then joined the Black Sash movement which assisted with the crisis in Cradock's schools. The boycott was called off in April 1985. In 1985, he was appointed UDF organiser and proceeded to establish liberation associations, and sector organisations within communities that were oppressed. He did this in 56 areas. On 26 June 1985, CRADORA celebrated 30 years of the Freedom Charter where Goniwe delivered the keynote address on its formation in Kliptown.

== Murder ==
On 27 June 1985, Goniwe, Fort Calata, Sparrow Mkhonto and Sicelo Mhlauli, who were later known as The Cradock Four, went to Port Elizabeth to attend a provincial meeting of the UDF in with Goniwe's vehicle. The Cradock Four were abducted by the security police near Bluewater Bay shortly after their departure from Port Elizabeth and were then murdered by the security police. Goniwe's burnt, stabbed and mutilated body was found a number of days later. A funeral was held for Goniwe, Calata, Mkhonto and Mhlauli on 20 July 1985 where Allan Boesak, Beyers Naudé and Steve Tshwete gave keynote addresses. A message from the then president of the ANC Oliver Tambo was read.

== Memorials ==
After the end of apartheid in 1994, Goniwe was memorialised in a number of ways. The Matthew Goniwe School of Leadership and Governance was founded to serve as the training arm of the Gauteng Department of Education, and the Matthew Goniwe Memorial High School was named after him. A memorial was also erected in honour of The Cradock Four.

The South African Democratic Teachers Union, the largest teacher union in the Southern Hemisphere, has also named its head office as "Matthew Goniwe House" as a revolutionary symbol in memory of the role he played in the struggle of shaping South African society, education in particular.
