= Sicelo Mhlauli =

South African anti-apartheid activist (1949–1985)

Personal details
- Born: May 25, 1949 Cradock, Cape Province; Union of South Africa
- Died: June 27, 1985 (aged 36) Bluewater Bay, Port Elizabeth, South Africa
- Party: United Democratic Front (South Africa), South African Communist Party, African National Congress
- Spouse: Nombuyiselo Zonke
- Children: 2
- Education: Lovedale College
- Occupation: Anti-Apartheid activist

Sicelo Mhlauli (25 May 1949 – 27 June 1985) was a South African anti-apartheid activist, and one of the Cradock Four who were murdered by South African police in 1985.

== Early life ==
Sicelo Mhlauli was born on 25 May 1949, at Emagqomeni Location in Cradock in the Eastern Cape. His family later moved to Lingelihle Township in 1962 to a section called Taptap. His grandfather Qobose Mhlauli was also a politician and had worked closely with James Calata who was Fort Calata's grandfather and one of the founding members of the South African Native National Congress. Mhlauli went to St James Primary, Cradock Bantu Secondary and finally studied teaching at Lovedale College where he majored in Afrikaans and History.

== Career ==
Mhlauli's teaching career started in 1974 at Thembalabantu High School in King William's Town where he also became boarding master. In 1975, the hostel students embarked on a food strike, demanding better quality food. The student leaders were arrested and during their appearance, Mhlauli would be in court to show his support. The security police opposed Mhauli's actions because they believed the students were arrested for disturbing the education system. He then went to work as a principal at Archie Velile Secondary in Dimbaza. During a student stay-away demanding proper representation in the student council and equal education in South Africa for both black and white students; some students were assaulted by the police. Mhlauli then took the injured to a nearby clinic; this act was also opposed by the security police.

== Politics ==
Mhlauli met ex-political prisoner Msuthu Sonkwala who was from Cradock but not allowed to live there by the government due to his banning conditions after he was released from prison. Mhlauli held political meetings with Sonkwala and other ex-political prisoners. They would discuss politics and ways to mobilise the community and teach them about the current political status. Their aim was to get the community involved in protests against the injustices that were brought by the apartheid government.

Mhlauli then received a post as a principal at a high school in Bongolwethu Township in Oudtshoorn. During this time, he married Nombuyiselo Zonke who was also from Cradock and they had two children together named Ntsika and Babalwa. In August 1983, he attended the launch of the United Democratic Front (South Africa) as part of the Oudtshoorn delegation. Soon after this, they formed the Oudtshoorn Civic Organisation and the Bhongolwethu Youth Organisation. His house became the operation centre for struggle advancement in the Southern Cape Region. His wife became part of a collective of women who championed the establishment of the women's organisation in their region. A newsletter named Saamstaan (stand together) was established, and Mhlauli was part of the committee which established the publication. This publication informed the public about political events in South Africa. It is believed that Mhlauli survived an arson attack at his office that destroyed all of his belongings, however details regarding this event are scarce.

== Death and legacy ==
During winter school holidays, Mhlauli met with Matthew Goniwe who encouraged him to attend a UDF meeting in Port Elizabeth on the 27 June 1985, which Mhlauli agreed to. On 26 June, the community at Lingelihle and surrounding areas held Freedom Charter celebrations and different organisations which affiliated with the UDF, gave speeches. Mhlauli attended the event as a member of the Oudtshoorn Civic Organization which was affiliated with the UDF.

On 27 June, the four men now referred to as the Cradock Four, went to a UDF meeting in Port Elizabeth. Mhlauli's had been at a course in PE and he had planned to pick her up on their way home. This however did not materialise as their meeting went on until late in the evening. The men were last seen at that meeting. Mhlauli's body was the second to be found after Sparrow Mkhonto in a bush near Bluewater Bay. He was handcuffed and tied with a rope with 25 stab wounds to his chest, seven in the back and another four in his arms. His throat was cut and his right hand severed; and his body was burned. The Cradock Four were buried at a mass funeral where thousands of people attended on the 20 July 1985. Speakers at the funeral included Beyers Naudé, Allan Boesak and Steve Tshwete gave keynote addresses. A message from the then president of the ANC Oliver Tambo was read.

To honour him, Mhlauli was awarded the Order of Luthuli in Silver by the Presidency of South Africa. The order was for his "Outstanding contribution and dedicating his life to a free, just and democratic South Africa".
