= Fort Calata =

South African anti-apartheid activist, and one of The Cradock Four

Personal details
- Born: November 5, 1956 Cradock, Cape Province; Union of South Africa
- Died: June 27, 1985 (aged 28) Bluewater Bay, Port Elizabeth, South Africa
- Party: United Democratic Front (South Africa), South African Communist Party, African National Congress
- Spouse: Nomonde Calata
- Children: Dorothy, Lukhanyo and Thumani
- Education: Lennox Sebe Teachers College
- Occupation: Teacher

Fort Calata OLS (5 November 1956 – 27 June 1985) was a South African anti-apartheid activist and one of The Cradock Four murdered by the South African police in 1985.

== Early life ==
Fort Calata was born on 5 November 1956. He is the grandson of James Calata, one of the founding members of the South African Native National Congress. James Calata was also Secretary General from 1936 to 1949. Fort Calata started school in 1963 when he went to St James, then proceeded to Macembe Lower Primary and then Nxuba Higher Primary. He completed his matriculation at Cradock Secondary School. He joined a band called the Ambassadors in 1972 and became its drummer and guitarist. He met Nomonde Calata in 1974 and they married in 1980.

Calata completed his Secondary Teachers Diploma at Lennox Sebe Teachers College, now known as Griffiths Mxenge College. His specialties were Accounting, Business Economics and Afrikaans.

== Work and politics ==
Calata started work in 1979 at Dimbaza High School in Ciskei. Together with some teachers at the school, they formed a burial society which served as an underground cell. He was arrested in 1980 together with 32 students for his political activities and was detained for a month.

Calata taught Afrikaans and Xhosa for standards 6 and 7 at Sam Xhali Secondary in 1981. He met Matthew Goniwe and they became friends and comrades. In 1983, the Cradock Youth Association (CRADOYA) was launched and Calata became its secretary. Their first task was to stand against what they deemed were unfair rental systems that were proposed by the Eastern Cape Administration Board.

In November 1983, Calata was part of the ‘’’Release Mandela Campaign’’’. His wife, Nomonde Calata, lost her job at the Cradock Provincial Hospital after she was found wearing the campaign t-shirt. She was charged with 3 months in prison or a fine of R800. In December 1983, he received a letter from the government notifying him of his removal from permanent staff at Sam Xhali and placed on probation for 12 months.

In January 1984, students started a boycott after they learned of the expulsion of Goniwe from Sam Xhali. Due to Calata’s involvement in politics and relations with Goniwe, he was also targeted by the security police. Calata was then detained on 31 March 1984 together with Matthew Goniwe, Mbulelo Goniwe and Fezile Madoda Jacobs. They were detained at Diepkloof Prison which was previously known as Fort Prison. This was the same place his grandfather was detained in during the Treason Trial in 1956. Calata was informed on 21 August while in detention that he was dismissed from his teaching post due to violating the Education Act of 1979.

That same month, the community launched a week long boycott of white owned shops in protest against the detention of community leaders. Calata and 10 others were then released on 10 October 1984. Upon his release, he continued his political activities and was involved in mass actions against apartheid education and other discriminatory laws including Black Local Authorities, the Tricameral Parliament and influx control.

== Death and memory ==
On 26 June 1985, during the celebration of the Freedom Charter, Calata addressed a crowd at Lingelihle community hall. The following day Calata, Goniwe, Sparrow Mkhonto and Sicelo Mhlauli drove to Port Elizabeth to attend a United Democratic Front meeting. They did not return home and their burnt car and mutilated bodies were found a week after their disappearance. Calata died of stab wounds to his chest on 27 June 1985 near Bluewater Bay in Port Elizabeth. At that time, Nomonde Calata was six months pregnant with their daughter, Thumani. A funeral was held for Goniwe, Calata, Mkhonto and Mhlauli on 20 July 1985 where Allan Boesak, Beyers Naudé and Steve Tshwete gave keynote addresses. A message from the then president of the ANC Oliver Tambo was read.

A memorial was erected in honour of The Cradock Four Calata was awarded the Order of Luthuli by the South African Presidency for “Outstanding contribution and dedicating his life to a free, just and democratic South Africa”.
