= Sparrow Mkhonto =

South African anti-apartheid activist, and one of The Cradock Four

Sparrow Mkonto

Personal details
- Born: 24 December 1951 Cradock, Cape Province; Union of South Africa
- Died: 27 June 1985 (aged 33) Bluewater Bay, Port Elizabeth, South Africa
- Party: United Democratic Front (South Africa), South African Communist Party, African National Congress
- Spouse: Sindiswa Mkonto
- Children: Lonwabo
- Education: Xhali Secondary School
- Occupation: Railway worker

Sparrow Mkonto OLS (24 December 1951 – 27 June 1985) was a South African anti-apartheid activist, and one of The Cradock Four murdered by the South African police in 1985.

== Early life and education ==
Sparrow Mkonto was born on 24 December 1951 in Bhongeni Section of Lingelihle Township (South Africa) in Cradock. He was one of The Cradock Four who were murdered during Apartheid by members of the South African Security Police on 27 June 1985.

Mkonto attended Macembe Lower Primary, Akena Primary and Sam Xhali Secondary School. Matthew Goniwe was one of his teachers at Sam Xhali. Due to financial constraints, Mkonto left school after he passed his junior secondary certificate. After he dropped out of school, he established a soccer club in his community. He also became politically active due to the influence of Goniwe.

== Political life ==
Mkonto found employment working at a depot in Cradock for the Department of Railways and Harbours. He subsequently joined the railway workers union. His work at the union had attracted the attention of the security police who conspired with his employers to fire him on spurious charges. He was dismissed from work in 1983 as he was accused of being a communist who arranged political meetings during working hours. His wife was also fired from her job at a hair salon on the pretext that her husband was a communist. In 1983, the Cradock Ratepayers Association (CRADORA) was formed which advocated for the rights of residents to negotiate against unfair increases in rent. This organisation was affiliated with the United Democratic Front (South Africa). He became a senior office bearer for CRADORA as well as the chairperson of the Broad Forum which consisted of CRADORA executives and leaders from other organisations in Lingelihle. Mkonto was detained and assaulted by the security police on several occasions. He would be taken to the Cradock security police headquarters where he was assaulted and beaten, then released. He laid a charge against the police but this was never investigated. During the Freedom Charter celebrations on 26 June 1983 in Lingelihle community hall, Mkonto spoke on behalf of CRADORA, focusing his speech on the future of the new South Africa which would respect rights to own land and proper compensation of workers for their labour.

== Death and honours ==
On 27 June 1985, Mkonto left for a UDF meeting with Goniwe, Fort Calata and Sicelo Mhlauli in Port Elizabeth. The four were never seen alive again. Mkonto's body was the first to be found in Bluewater Bay near Port Elizabeth. It was found 1 km from the burnt car in which they had been travelling. He was found burnt, handcuffed and tied with a rope with gunshot wounds to his head and stab wounds to his chest. A two-year inquest started in 1987 under the Inquest Act No 58 of 1959. The Cradock Four were buried in Cradock on 20 July 1985 at a mass funeral. Speakers at the funeral included Beyers Naudé, Allan Boesak and Steve Tshwete gave keynote addresses. A message from the then president of the ANC Oliver Tambo was read.

In 2006, he was conferred by the Presidency of South Africa with the Order of Luthuli in Silver for "outstanding contribution and dedicating his life to a free, just and democratic South Africa’’.

A memorial was erected in honour of the Cradock Four.
