= Victoria Mxenge =

South African activist (1942-1985)

- Born: 1 January 1942; King William's Town, Cape Province, Union of South Africa
- Died: 1 August 1985 (aged 43); Umlazi, Durban, Natal, South Africa
- Occupations: lawyer, nurse
- Known for: anti-apartheid activist

Victoria Nonyamezelo Mxenge (1 January 1942, King William's Town, Cape Province – 1 August 1985, Umlazi, Durban, Natal) was a South African anti-apartheid activist; she was trained as a nurse and midwife, and later began practising law.

Mxenge was murdered in August 1985, gunned down by four black men as she returned from a political meeting. She was killed on her driveway in Umlazi in front of her own children. The men were thought to be part of a government death squad. After her death, more than 1,000 students marched in Durban in protest and were "dispersed by police using dogs and clubs."

== Life ==
Mxenge was born in Tamara Village on 1 January 1942 in King William's Town to parents Wilmot Goso and Nobantu Ntebe. Victoria was the oldest of four siblings, two brothers namely Prince and Skhumbuzo and one sister Mandisa. After completing her primary education at Tamara, she went to Forbes Grant Secondary School where she completed the junior certificate (Grade 10). In 1959, she matriculated at Healdtown, Fort Beaufort in the Eastern Province. She trained as a nurse at Victoria Hospital and earned her qualifications in 1964. After she married Griffiths Mxenge, she and her husband moved to Natal (now KwaZulu-Natal). She took midwifery at King Edward Hospital and worked as a community nurse in Umlazi. In 1965, her husband was convicted under the Suppression of Communism Act and was imprisoned for two years on Robben Island. During their marriage, her husband faced various government-sanctioned bans and detentions. She and her husband had two sons, Mbasa and Viwe, and daughter Namhla.

== Work ==
After completing a midwifery course at King Edward Hospital, Victoria Mxenge worked as a community nurse at Umlazi Clinic. She then studied law through the University of South Africa. In 1981, some five years after her husband had set up a legal practice she acquired legal qualifications, joined the practice and was subsequently admitted as an attorney. On 19 November 1981, her husband was brutally assassinated by Vlakplaas agents led by Dirk Coetzee in Umlazi township, south of Durban. He had multiple stab wounds and his body was found near the soccer field in Umlazi and it fell on her to identify his mutilated body at a government mortuary the morning after his murder. It was claimed by police general Dirk Coetzee that her husband was murdered by the African National Congress (ANC), which she vigorously refuted. The ANC issued a public statement from Lusaka decrying his murder and paying tribute to his contribution in the struggle. In 1996, Dirk Coetzee confessed that he led a group that killed Mxenge.

After her husband's murder, Mxenge kept their law practice going. In 1983, she successfully defended students against the confiscation of their results by the Department of Education". She also intervened in cases in which the youth were ill-treated while imprisoned. Mxenge represented families of victims of the Matolo raid and Lesotho raid. Mxenge started a bursary fund in memory of her husband. She became a member of the Release Nelson Mandela Committee (RMC), sat on the executive of the National Organisation of Women (NOW) and the Natal Treasurer of the UDF.

Mxenge was part of the defence team for the United Democratic Front and Natal Indian Congress during the Pietermaritzburg Treason Trial at the Pietermaritzburg Supreme Court. In July 1985, she spoke at the funeral of the Cradock Four, Matthew Goniwe, Fort Calata, Sparrow Mkhonto and Sicelo Mhlauli. The funeral was attended by over 50,000 mourners. During her speech Mxenge condemned the apartheid government and referred to the murder of the Cradock Four as a "dastardly act of cowardices."

== Murder ==
On 1 August 1985, she was "gunned down by four black men" as she returned from a political meeting. She was killed on her driveway in Umlazi in front of her children. The men were thought to be part of a government death squad. After her death, more than 1,000 students marched in Durban in protest and were "dispersed by police using dogs and clubs."

Her funeral which was held on 11 August 1985 in Rayi Village near King William's Town was attended by 10,000 people, and letters of condolence were received from Nelson Mandela and Oliver Tambo amongst others. After her funeral, mourners in Duncan Village took to the streets and vandalised public property. This resulted in clashes between the police and residents which left nine people dead and 138 injured.

In 1987, South African magistrates claimed that she had died from "head injuries and had been murdered by person unknown". The Truth and Reconciliation Commission (TRC) Report on the assassination of Victoria Mxenge documents that Marvin Sefako (alias Bongi Raymond Malinga) was allegedly recruited by the security branch and that Brigadier Peter Swanepoel was his handler. Malinga confessed that he had killed Mxenge.

== Legacy ==
In October 2005, the South African Ministry of the Environment launched the third and final Lillian Ngoyi-class patrol vessels named Victoria Mxenge in her honor. In 2006, both Victoria Mxenge and her husband were posthumously awarded the Order of Luthuli in Silver for excellent contributions to the field of law and sacrifices made in the fight against apartheid in South Africa. The Victoria Mxenge Group of Advocates was officially established on 1 July 2011 and is part of the Johannesburg Society of Advocates. On 20 August 2017, the KwaZulu-Natal government and eThekwini Municipality unveiled statues in honour of Griffiths and Victoria Mxenge in uMlazi, south of Durban.

== In popular culture ==
Victoria Mxenge was mentioned alongside other anti-apartheid activists Steve Biko and Neil Aggett in the 1987 song Asimbonanga by the South African band Savuka, composed by Johnny Clegg and dedicated to Nelson Mandela.
