= Dutch Reformed Church, Middelburg, Eastern Cape =

Church in Middelburg, Eastern Cape, South Africa

Dutch Reformed Church
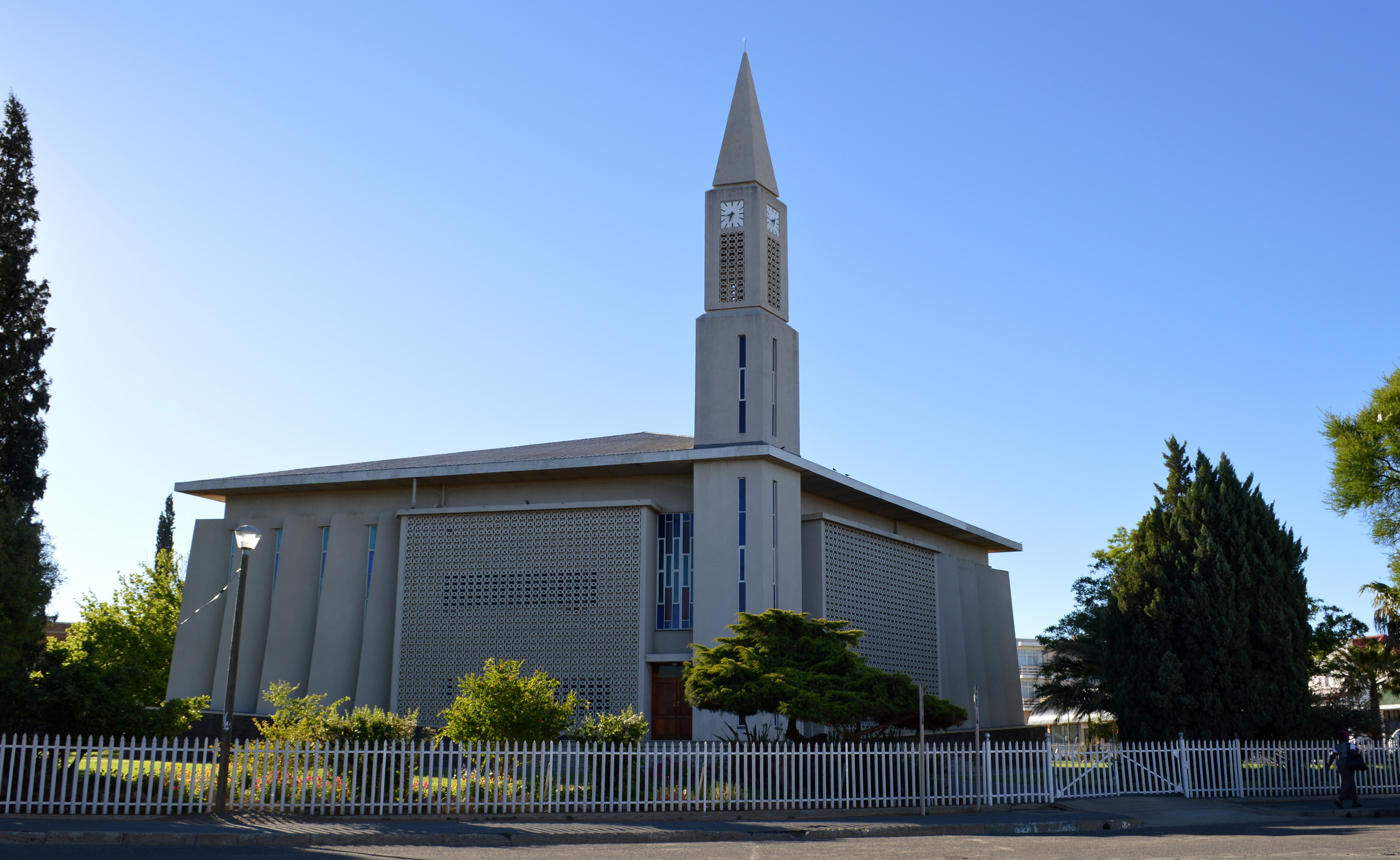
- Location: Middelburg, Eastern Cape
- Country: South Africa
- Denomination: Nederduits Gereformeerde Kerk

History
- Founded: 1852

Architecture
- Functional status: Church

The Dutch Reformed Church in Middelburg, Eastern Cape was a congregation of the Dutch Reformed Church in the present-day province of the Eastern Cape that was founded on 19 May 1852 as the 10th congregation in the later Synod of the Eastern Cape and the 49th oldest congregation in the NG Church, but merged with the NG congregation Middelburg-Uitsig on 13 September 2010 to form the NG congregation Middelburg-Karoo. It is the oldest congregation that has officially ceased to exist or been re-established through incorporation or merger.

== Foundation ==
By the mid-19th century, the Colesberg congregation also included the Rhenosterberg ward. Due to poor transport facilities at the time, as well as the long distances to the church in Colesberg, congregation members in this remote ward sought to establish a separate congregation. In this they were supported by members in the adjacent corners of the congregations of Graaff-Reinet, Cradock and Richmond.

After a list of names of persons who were interested in establishing a new congregation was submitted, the church council of Colesberg decided on 6 April 1852 as follows: “The Well-Respected Church Council of Colesberg hereby gives full permission for the new establishment at Driefontein and prays that the All-Governing Head of the Church will govern the interested parties in a friendly manner and will soon make their intentions successful.” Thus it came about that the new congregation, Middelburg, was founded on 19 May 1852 on the farm Driefontein which had been purchased for this purpose through the mediation of the two gentlemen Willem S. Smit and Henning J.H. Coetzee. The founding meeting was characterized by great enthusiasm. Everyone agreed on the name of the congregation because the farm Driefontein is located almost in the middle between the neighboring towns (being a distance of 10 hours on horseback from Colesberg, Cradock and Richmond, 12 hours from Graaff-Reinet and 16 from Burgersdorp). The members of the Presbyterian Commission of Graaff-Reinet by whom the official foundation took place were Rev. Andrew Murray of the NG congregation in Graaff-Reinet, Rev. J.F. Berrangé of the NG congregation Richmond and the elders Barend Pienaar and J.J. Naudé.

== Ministers ==
- William Murray, 1854 - 1865
- C.S. Morgan, 1866 - 1873
- J.R. Albertyn, 1874 - 1883
- Gerrit van Niekerk, 1884 - 1903
- Paul August Winter, 1903 - 19 May 1908 (died in office)
- Ebbe Dommisse, 1909 - 1920
- Louis Johannes Fourie, 1921 - 1938 (emeritus; died on 23 January 1941)
- Gert Petrus van den Berg, 1938 - 1942
- Johannes Lodewyk Nel, 1940 - 1941
- Gerrit Conradie le Roux, 1942 - 1947
- Irenee Emile Heyns, 1943 - 1946
- Jacobus Johannes Sieberhagen, 1946 - 1950
- Pieter Francois de Vos Muller, 1948 - 1959
- Nico Schreuder, 1951 - 1958
- Jacobus Albertus Venter, 1958 - 1962
- Jacobus Petrus Johannes Smit, 1962 – 1967
- Pieter Kruger Mentz, 1965 - 1969
- Petrus Albertus Loots, 1967 - 1972
- Jacobus Philippus Bezuidenhout, 3 March 1978 - 1988
