= Lungisile Ntsebeza =

South African academic (born 1954)

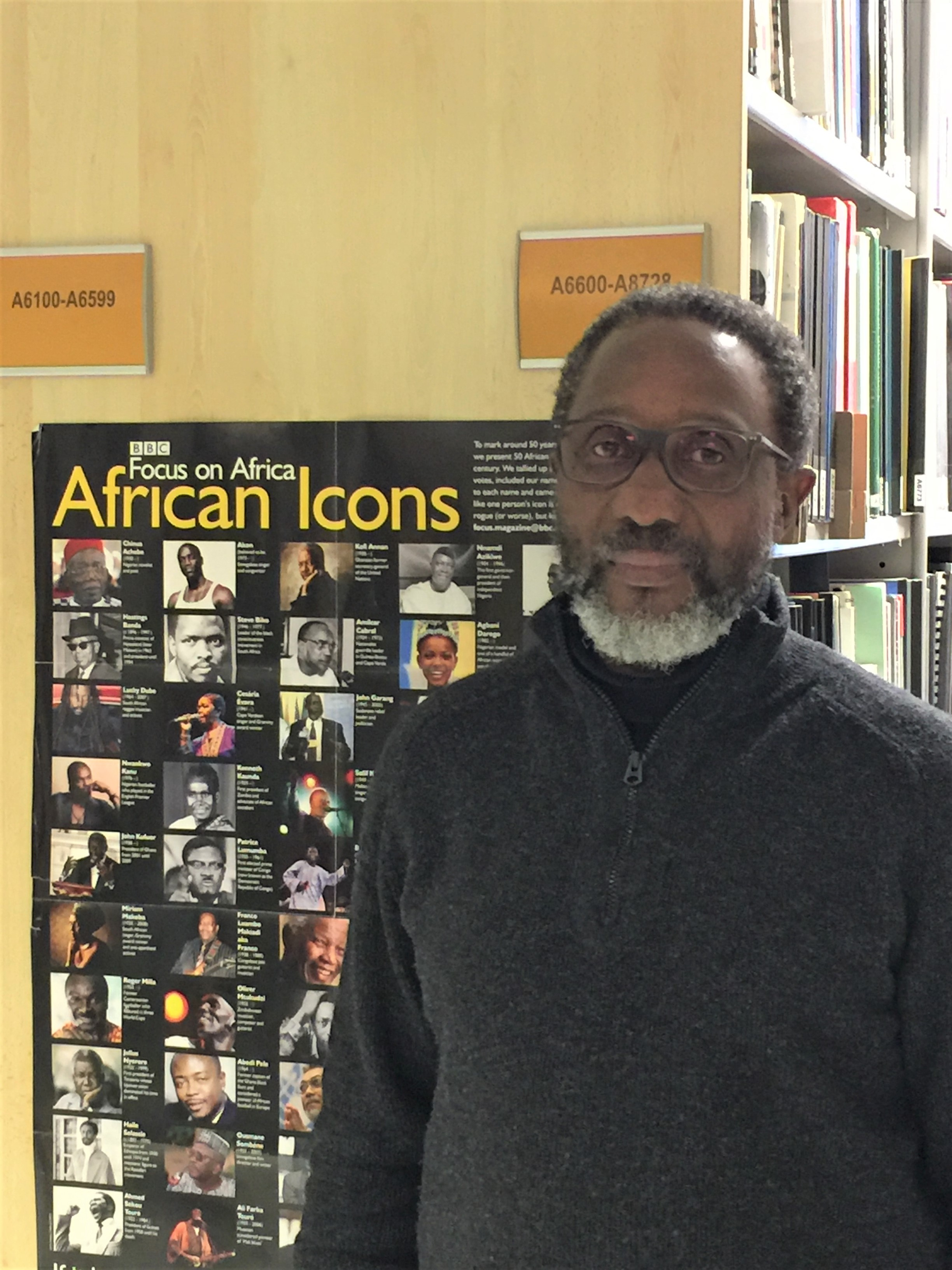
- Lungisile Ntsebeza in 2020
- Born: 1954 (age 71–72); Cala, Cape Province; Union of South Africa
- Occupation: Professor emeritus at the University of Cape Town
- Relatives: Dumisa Ntsebeza (brother)

Academic background
- Education: University of South Africa (BA); University of Natal (MA); Rhodes University (PhD)
- Thesis: Structures and struggles of rural local government in South Africa: The case of traditional authorities in the Eastern Cape (2002)
- Doctoral advisor: Fred Hendricks

Academic work
- Discipline: Sociology
- Sub-discipline: Agrarian studies African studies
- Main interests: Land reform in South Africa; Traditional leadership

Lungisile Ntsebeza (born 1954) is a South African sociologist. He is professor emeritus of sociology and African studies at the University of Cape Town, where he has worked since 2004. He was the university's A. C. Jordan Professor of African Studies from 2012 until his retirement in 2022. He also held the South African Research Chair in Land Reform and Democracy in South Africa. Since 2023 he has been the Chair of Council at the University of Fort Hare.

== Early life and activism ==
Ntsebeza was born in 1954 in Cala, a small town in the Eastern Cape. Both of his parents were teachers and neither was overtly political, though his father a devout reader of the Daily Dispatch. Among his siblings was Dumisa Ntsebeza, his elder brother.

The Ntsebeza brothers first rose to prominence in the anti-apartheid movement, particularly through their role in founding a political study group to examine alternatives to apartheid. The group was not committed either to the Congress tradition or to the Black Consciousness Movement, though its members were strongly influenced by Marxism. In 1976, several members of the study group, including Matthew Goniwe and both Ntsebeza brothers, were arrested by the South African Police and charged with violating the Suppression of Communism Act, 1950. The trial took place under authorities in the Transkei, the newly independent bantustan that governed Cala, and the brothers were sentenced to four years' imprisonment.

While in prison, Ntsebeza enrolled in a correspondence course through the University of South Africa, and at the end of 1980 he obtained his first degree, a Bachelor of Arts in philosophy and political science. Released in 1981, he was banished to his hometown of Cala, where he revived a bookshop formerly run by his parents, both of whom had recently died. He was reputed for selling "subversive" literature. In 1987, Ntsebeza enrolled at the University of Cape Town to study towards an Honours degree in African studies. He went on to complete a Master of Arts in economic history at the University of Natal in 1993 and a PhD in sociology at Rhodes University in 2002.

== Academic career ==
After receiving his PhD in 2002, Ntsebeza was the acting director of the Programme for Land and Agrarian Studies at the University of the Western Cape. He returned to the University of Cape Town in 2004 as an associate professor of sociology, and he was also seconded part-time to the Human Sciences Research Council as a senior research specialist.

At the beginning of 2008 he took office as a full professor of African studies and sociology at the University of Cape Town. On 1 January that year, he inaugurated the South African Research Chair in Land Reform and Democracy in South Africa: State and Civil Society Dynamics, a chair located at the university and funded by the Department of Science and Technology and the National Research Foundation. The chair's research programme centred on land ownership in South Africa, with themes including post-apartheid land reform and redistribution; the former bantustans, traditional leadership, and rural democratisation; and women's rights and poverty reduction.

While retaining the South African Research Chair, in June 2012 Ntsebeza was additionally appointed to the A. C. Jordan Chair in African Studies, a chair in Archibald Campbell Jordan's honour which had not been held since Mahmood Mamdani left it acrimoniously in 1999. The chair entailed Ntsebeza's appointment as the director of the university's Centre for African Studies.

== Scholarship ==
Ntsebeza's best-known book, published in 2005, is Democracy Compromised: Chiefs and the Politics of Land in South Africa. He also co-edited a 2007 book on land reform with Ruth Hall and co-edited a 2012 book on the Mpondo revolts with Thembela Kepe.

Ntsebeza argued that contemporary traditional leadership institutions, as recognised by the post-apartheid South African government, were modelled on apartheid-era tribal authorities and were largely anti-democratic. In this vein he gave evidence in the Eastern Cape High Court in a major court case concerning the selection of a headman in his hometown, Cala; he was consulted on precolonial traditional leadership practices, as a source of customary law, in the Cala area. Judge Clive Plasket handed down judgment in favour of the community in August 2015 in Premier of the Eastern Cape v Ntamo, finding that the Cala community was entitled to elect its headman democratically.

== Retirement ==
Ntsebeza retired in 2022, though he continued to serve as an emeritus professor and as a senior research scholar in the Centre for African Studies. He had joined the council of the University of Fort Hare in 2021, and on 28 June 2023 he was announced as that university's new Chair of Council.

== Honours ==
In September 2017, at that year's National Research Foundation Awards, Ntsebeza received the Hamilton Naki Award. On 7 February 2020, Leiden University conferred upon him an honorary doctorate.
