= List of Apartheid South African assassinations =

List of South African assassinations refers to a list of alleged and confirmed assassinations, reported to have been conducted by the Apartheid regime.

== List ==
Target	Position	Date	City	Country
Vuyisile Mini	Umkhonto we Sizwe activist	6 November 1964	Pretoria	South Africa
Frederick John Harris	African Resistance Movement activist	1 April 1965	Pretoria	South Africa
Mthuli ka Shezi	Black People's Convention activist	December 1972	Germiston	South Africa
Steve Biko	Black Consciousness activist	12 September 1977	Pretoria	South Africa
Rick Turner	Durban Moment activist	8 January 1978	Durban	South Africa
Clemens Kapuuo	SWANU activist	27 March 1978	Katutura	(South Africa) South West Africa
Solomon Mahlangu	Umkhonto we Sizwe activist	6 April 1979	Pretoria	South Africa
David Sibeko	Pan Africanist Congress activist	12 June 1979	Dar es Salaam	Tanzania
Joe Gqabi	ANC activist	31 July 1981	Salisbury (now Harare)	Zimbabwe
Griffiths Mxenge	ANC activist	19 November 1981	Umlazi	South Africa
Neil Aggett	Fosatu activist	5 February 1982	Johannesburg	South Africa
Ruth First	Fosatu activist	17 August 1982	Maputo	Mozambique
Jeanette Schoon	ANC activist	28 June 1984	Lubango	Angola
Vernon Nkadimeng	ANC activist	21 May 1985	Gaborone	Botswana
Thamsanga Mnyele	ANC activist	14 June 1985	Gaborone	Botswana
Victoria Mxenge	ANC activist	1 August 1985	Umlazi	South Africa
Benjamin Moloise	ANC activist	18 October 1985	Pretoria	South Africa
Andrew Zondo	Umkhonto we Sizwe activist	29 December 1985	Pretoria	South Africa
Immanuel Shifidi	SWAPO activist	30 November 1986	Windhoek	(South Africa) South West Africa
Dulcie September	ANC activist	29 March 1988	Paris	France
David Webster	UDF activist	1 May 1989	Johannesburg	South Africa
Anton Lubowski	SWAPO activist	12 September 1989	Windhoek	(South Africa) South West Africa
