= Mxenge =

Mxenge is an African surname. Notable people with the surname include:

- Griffiths Mxenge (1935–1981), South African anti-apartheid activist
- Victoria Mxenge (1942–1985), South African anti-apartheid activist, wife of Griffiths
