= Dorothy Nyembe =

South African activist and politician

Dorothy Nomzansi Nyembe OMSS (31 December 1931 – 18 December 1998) was a South African activist and politician.

== Biography ==
Born near Dundee, KwaZulu-Natal, Nyembe was the daughter of Leeya Basolise Nyembe, whose father was Chief Ngedee Shezi. She attended mission schools until Standard 9. She had her only child when she was fifteen.

Nyembe spent much of her life under apartheid either under banning orders or in prison, serving terms from 1963 to 1966 for furthering the ANC movement and from 1968 until 1983 for harboring terrorists, serving time in Barberton and then Kroonstad. Nyembe joined the Natal Organisation of Women (NOW) after her 1984 release. She was again released from detention in 1987.

She was elected to the National Assembly in 1994.

== Career ==
Nyembe was active in politics, participating or running many progressive organizations. She joined the African National Congress in 1952 and soon became an active member. When she joined the ANC the Defiance campaign was going on. Nyembe was imprisoned in 1952 for defying unjust laws. She led women from Natal in the Defiance Campaign of 1956. Part of the Defiance Campaign was being a leader against the removal of the Cato Manor in 1956. In 1956 she was elected as the vice president of the Durban ANC. She was also active in the movement to boycott beer halls. Beer Halls, taking jobs away from many women.

In 1959 she was elected president of the Natal division of the African National Congress Women's League. When the ANC was banned in 1960, she joined Spear of the Nation. In 1961, Nyembe was recruited into the Umkhonto we Sizwe and worked with a number of allies such as Chief Albert Luthuli, Moses Mabhida, Nelson Mandela, Walter Sisulu and Oliver Tambo."

In 1963 she led women during the Natal Women's Revolt. She was released on 23 March 1984, after her release, Nyembe started working for Natal Organisation of Women (NOW). NOW served a number of purposes. Fighting against rent increases, transport costs, poor education and lack of child care facilities are the main focus of the organization."

== Work for the African National Congress ==
The ANC's philosophy during the early 1950s was that of Gandhi's. A passive philosophy where members were willing to go to prison if necessary. Nyembe, while not a pacifist, joined the ANC and in 1952 was willing to break laws that imposed restrictions of political, labour and residential rights. Nyembe's time in the defiance campaign ended when, in 1953, the British passed laws that banned protest meetings. After her election president of the Natal division in 1959 Nyembe was involved in the planning of opposition to pass laws. Pass laws would have made it required that all black citizens carry an identity card around in white areas. After the Sharpeville massacre and the ANC and the PAC being banned under newly passed the Unlawful Organisations Act. Nyembe joined the armed wing of the ANC uMkhonto weSizwe (MK). Under this operation she participated in sabotaging government facilities.

== Natal Women's Revolt ==
As a leader of the Natal Women's Revolt, Nyembe was with other South African black women against the municipal system of beer halls: it was illegal to brew beer at home. Beer Halls took a major source of income away from women and funded the apartheid administration. This organization also sought the destruction of the Durban Corporation property. Nyembe was fighting for influx control, passes for women, and permits to seek work.

== Awards ==
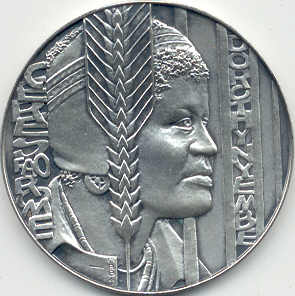
FAO CERES Medal - Silver Obverse

Awarded FAO Ceres Medal in 1976.

During her career she received the Order of Friendship of Peoples, from the Soviet Union, and the Chief Albert Luthuli prize, the latter in 1992.

Order for Meritorious Service in silver (2003).
