= Natal Organisation of Women =

The Natal Organisation of Women (NOW) was a regional women's organization in South Africa in the Natal area. NOW was founded in 1983 and affiliated with the United Democratic Front (UDF). NOW included women from all ages, class and races. NOW's values were in opposition of those expressed by the Inkatha's women's groups.

== History ==
Since 1980, women felt that there was a need for "an ongoing programme that would unite women and deal with women's issues." A group of women founded NOW in December 1983. One of the founding members was Victoria Mxenge. NOW launched the group on August 9, 1984. The issues they focused on included the cost of living, housing and problems surrounding maternity and childcare in South Africa. The first branches of NOW were located in Durban. The first president of NOW was Phumzile Mlambo-Ngcuka. When Mxenge was killed, NOW organized a demonstration in Durban.

NOW disbanded in 1990 and members joined with the African National Congress (ANC).

== Notable members ==
- Ela Gandhi
- Pregs Govender
- Phumzile Mlambo-Ngcuka
- Victoria Mxenge
