= Beer Hall Boycott =

Women-led protests against South African beer regulations

The Beer Hall Boycott of South Africa was a nationwide, women-led campaign of boycotting and demonstrating against municipal beer halls stretching from roughly the 1920s to the 1960s. The Native Beer Act of 1908 had made it illegal for South African women to brew traditional beer. Police raided homes and destroyed home-brewed liquor so that men would use municipal beerhalls. In response, women attacked the beerhalls and destroyed equipment and buildings.

== Alcohol legislation ==
The Native Beer Act of 1908 made it illegal for South African women to brew traditional beer. Legislation restricted African natives from consuming European-produced alcohol. Educated African men were issued permits, which allowed them to consume European wine, spirits and malt beer. The average uneducated person would consume sorghum beer made by African women. South Africa lost its preferential trade status in the Commonwealth when it became a republic in 1961. This put the export trade of wine and beer under threat and soon there was an increasing demand for the lifting of the prohibition.

Before 1928 African women played an important role in beer-brewing for government structures and beer halls. The sale of sorghum beer in municipalities was an industry worth R3 million in 1961. The Liquor Amendment Act of 1962 lifted authority on Africans as liquor consumers. Africans were prohibited from entering the liquor market, however, they could purchase liquor from 'non-European' entrances of white bottle stores. By the 1950s, police were no longer able to control the sales of 'European' liquor in urban areas. The South African police stated that the lifting of the prohibition would normalise the drinking habits of African people.

== Beer Hall Boycott ==
The boycott of the beer halls was an indication of the growing discontent of people against many oppressive measures before democracy in South Africa.

Beer Hall Riots started in 1929 nationwide. These boycotts and riots were in response to the Native Beer Act of 1908 which resulted in many African women in urban and rural areas losing a source of income. Tradition beer brewers were resistant towards municipal beer halls as they gave authority to councils to sell African beer and the African brewer would no longer be able to make an income. The Natal branch of the Industrial and Commercial Workers Union (ICU) campaigned for the closure of municipal beer halls. Between 1950 and 1951, annual municipal profits from beer sales exceeded £175,000; by 1952, those profits exceeded £200,000.

During the 1976 Soweto riots, student mobs attacked beer halls. Almost every beer hall in Soweto was affected. The police killed several Diepkloof rioters as they fled from a beer hall during demonstrations. The beer halls destroyed in 1976 were never rebuilt.

== Durban ==
Discussion of Beer Hall Boycotts started as early as 1926 in Durban. On 17 June 1959 in Cato Manor, KwaZulu Natal, a group of African women staged a demonstration against liquor legislation at the Cato Manor Beer Hall. Other protesters entered a beer hall and destroyed beer and other property. The police dispersed the protesters and maintained surveillance throughout the evening. By 18 June 1959, demonstrations had spread to Dalton Road and Victoria Street in the city of Durban. This area is now part of the Liberation Heritage Route. Men present at these Beer Halls during the demonstrations were attacked and warned against supporting municipal beer halls. Director of the Bantu Administration Department, Mr Bourquin, addressed approximately 2000 women at the Cato Manor Beer Hall. After the women resisted orders from the police to disperse, a police baton charge took place. In a statement in the House of Assembly, the Minister for Justice stated that 25 buildings had been burnt down and 7 damaged, all associated to the Beer Hall riots. Beer Halls were temporarily closed and municipal bus services suspended after numerous attacks on vehicles. In June 1959 over 2000 women marched against men drinking in Beer Halls. The protestors organised a beer boycott which led to wide-scale uprisings all over Natal. During 1959, an estimated 20 000 women in Natal protested and more than 1 000 were convicted in the courts.

== Eastern Cape ==
After the Minister of Native Affairs granted the council the exclusive right to brew and supply beer from 1 July 1938, over 200 African women marched to the City Hall of East London to interview the Mayor. The legislation affected many women who earned a living through brewing beer in shebeens. It is estimated that over 20,000 women from 30 areas participated in various demonstrations, including the Beer Hall Boycotts.

== Notable people ==
=== Dorothy Nomzansi Nyembe ===
Dorothy Nomzansi Nyembe was born on 31 December 1931 near Dundee in KwaZulu-Natal. She participated in the establishment of the ANC Women's League in Cato Manor. She was one of the leaders against the removals from Cato Manor in 1956, and also one of the leaders of the beer hall boycotts.

=== Mary Ngalo ===
Mary Ngalo was born in Cradock, Eastern Cape. She was arrested during the beer hall boycotts of 1957 and sentenced to one month's imprisonment.

== See also ==
- Apartheid
- Beer in Africa
- Umqombothi
