= August Frederik Beutler =

August Beutler
- Born: August Frederik Beutler; 1728; Dinkelsbühl, Bavaria
- Died: Unknown; Dutch Cape Colony
- Military career
- Allegiance: Dutch Cape Colony
- Rank: Ensign

August Frederik Beutler (c. 1728 in Dinkelsbühl – ? in Cape Town) was an ensign (sergeant 1747–49, ensign 1749–54) in the employ of the Dutch East India Company who headed an epic 1752 reconnaissance expedition lasting 8 months from 29 February to November, eastward from Cape Town as far as the present-day site of Butterworth. Beutler wrote a comprehensive account of his pioneering expedition which was first published in 1896 by the historian George McCall Theal and in 1922 by the Dutch historian Everhardus Cornelis Godée Molsbergen (1875–1940). The mandate of the expedition was to report on the tribes living along the route, the possibility of trade and on anything else that might be profitable to the Dutch East India Company.

That Beutler's expedition was no lightweight affair, may be judged from his records. His diary lists two sergeants, four corporals, a drummer and 30 soldiers, a wagonmaster Pieter Clement, a surgeon Jan Hendrik van Ellewe, a botanist, a blacksmith, a wainwright, 11 wagons, and a boat for crossing impassable rivers.

In addition Beutler was accompanied by the surveyor and cartographer, Carel David Wentzel, Hendrik Beneke, the naturalist, and Carel Albregt Haupt, the official diarist. On their journey they crossed the Great Fish River and following trails blazed by hunters and game, penetrated Xhosa country up to the Qora River. He erected beacons denoting possession at St. Francis Bay and Algoa Bay in an effort to thwart suspected efforts by the French to colonise the coast.

On 14 August, coming across Bushman paintings near present-day Cradock, Haupt wrote:
"We noticed that in places here many pictures were found painted on the rocks, these being the work of the d'Gaua, who are called Little Chinese by our travellers. We went to a place about two hours from our camp to see these. Under the ridge of a kloof, in a kind of cave in which one could shelter from wind and rain, we saw pictures of wild horses, baboons and people in various positions, painted on the rocks in red, white and black. Some were rather well drawn, others not, the latter seeming to be the work of pupils. It is astonishing to find such things among such a coarse and ignorant people".

'Vaandrigsdrif' west of Swellendam and 'Bottelierskop' near Klein-Brakrivier were named after Beutler, 'Bottelier' being a corruption of his name, and 'Vaandrig' being Dutch for ensign.

Beutler married Anna Magdalena van den Heever on 4 January 1750 in Cape Town. She was the daughter of Pieter Petersen van den Heever (1705 Husum, Schleswig-Holstein - 1767 Cape Town) and Johanna Bockelenberg (c1708-) who were married on 23 June 1726 in Cape Town.
