= Bell Dewar =

- Company type: Public
- Founded: 1890
- Headquarters: Benmore, South Africa
- Website: fasken.com

Bell Dewar was a South African law firm. On 1 February 2013, it merged with Fasken Martineau, an international business law and litigation firm.

== History ==
When gold was discovered in Johannesburg in 1886, William Henry Somerset Bell was asked to examine and report on mining claims belonging to the Grahamstown Gold Mining Syndicate. On the strength of his report, the Grahamstown Gold Mining Company Ltd was floated; Bell became a director. Work for lawyers specializing in mining was available; the following year, Bell went to the Kimberley diamond fields. Subsequently, in 1889, he moved with his family to open a practice in Johannesburg. Charles Alexander Dewar joined Bell in 1915.

As an apparent company and mining law expert, Bell attracted the attention of foreign interest groups investing in South Africa in the early 20th century. Through Bell, the firm established a long association with the newspaper industry. His firm undertook legal work for The Rand Daily Mail and still represents The Sunday Times (South Africa), South Africa’s largest weekly newspaper. Bell Dewar partner, Kelsey Stuart, author of The Newspaperman's Guide to the Law, was legal advisor to the Rand Daily Mail at the time when the newspaper reported the so-called Information Scandal in 1978, as well as the prison conditions for South African political prisoners in the Cinderella Prison in 1965, in the course of which Stuart was initially charged by the State. Through its early involvement in employment law and trade unions, the firm was drawn into other high profile political matters during the 1980s and 1990s. These included the Delmas Treason Trial the Neil Aggett inquest and the DanChurchAid enquiry into the Foundation for Peace and Justice charity setup by Allan Boesak.

On an April day in 1998, President Nelson Mandela paid an unexpected visit to the office. Mandela remembered the firm from his days in legal practice; while driving past the firm’s office in Houghton, he decided to visit to pay his respects. He took the time to greet every member of staff. The event is immortalized on a plaque in the office; people present at the time never forgot the occasion.

With the 1990s and changes in political affairs in South Africa, the firm’s leadership realigned its vision and strategy as a specialist business law firm. In 2008, Bell Dewar changed its name from Bell Dewar and Hall, to “Bell Dewar”; in 2009, it relocated its office to Sandton.

On 1 February 2013, Bell Dewar merged with Fasken Martineau.
