= Mary Ngalo =

Anti-apartheid activist

- Born: Mary Nonyembezi Margaret Plaatjie; Cradock, Eastern Cape, South Africa
- Died: 16 March 1973
- Organization(s): African National Congress Youth League (ANCYL), African National Congress Women's League (ANCWL), Federation of South African Women (FEDSAW), Afro-Asian People's Solidarity Organisation

Mary Nonyembezi Ngalo (née Plaatjie) was a South African anti-apartheid activist and was also active in fighting for women's rights.

== Early life and education ==
Mary Nonyembezi Margaret Ngalo (nee Plaatjie) was born in Cradock, Eastern Cape, South Africa. She was the daughter of Tom Cetywayo and Lillian Fihliwe "Leah" Plaatjie. She met and married Zenzile Ngalo in Cradock.

== Career ==
Ngalo started participating in politics at an early age. She joined the ANC Youth League. As a leader of women in Cradock, she was elected as the branch secretary of the ANC Women's League. She held her post till she fled Cradock in 1961.

Ngalo mobilised hundreds of women to join the Federation of South African Women which was a non-racial body of women who fought in the struggle against Apartheid. The ANC Women's League launched the Beer Hall Boycott in Cradock. Ngalo encouraged men to use the money they earned on their families instead of the beerhalls. She was arrested in 1957 during the boycott with her baby son. They spent one month in prison.

During the 1960 State of Emergency, she was forced into hiding in Port Elizabeth. Her husband and other ANC militants from Cradock including Eric Vora and Lennon Melane were imprisoned in Port Elizabeth in the 1960s. Ngalo later escaped South Africa. The ANC Women's League organised for her to flee with her 3 children due to increased police persecution. She met her husband in Tanzania where he was an official.

In Tanzania, she was elected secretary of the ANC's Women's section Bureau in Tanzania, an external arm of the ANC Women's League. She worked alongside Ruth Mompati, Edna Mgabaza and Florence Mophosho. Mary and Zenzile Ngalo were transferred by the ANC to Cairo, Egypt.

In 1968 Mary Ngalo was appointed to the Women's Bureau of the Afro-Asian People's Solidarity Organisation (AAPSO). She attended the 5th conference of AAPSO in Cairo in January 1972 as well as the 10th anniversary of the All Africa Women's Conference in Dar-es-Salaam in 1972. She played an active role in this organisation till her sudden death in Cairo on 16 March 1973. Her mother still lived in Cradock at her death.
