= Ruth Hall (academic) =

Ruth Hall (born March 19, 1973) is the Director of and also a professor at PLAAS (the Institute for Poverty, Land and Agrarian Studies) at the University of the Western Cape, which she joined in 2002. A political scientist by training, she specialises in the politics and the political economy of agrarian reform, land redistribution, and poverty.

== Education ==
Hall holds a BSocSc from Cape Town University in Political Studies. She proceeded to the UK where she obtained a MPhil in Development Studies and DPhil in Politics both from Oxford University in 1998 and 2011 respectively.

== Select publications ==
=== Edited books ===
- Ruth Hall, ed. (2009). Another Countryside? Policy Options for Land and Agrarian Reform in South Africa. Cape Town: Institute for Poverty, Land and Agrarian Studies, University of the Western Cape.
- Lungisile Ntsebeza; Ruth Hall, eds. (2007). The Land Question in South Africa: The Challenge of Transformation and Redistribution. Cape Town: Human Sciences Research Council Press.

=== Journal articles ===
- Ruth Hall (2004). "A Political Economy of Land Reform in South Africa". Review of African Political Economy. 31 (100): 213–227. doi:10.1080/0305624042000262257. hdl:10.1080/0305624042000262257. JSTOR 4006888. S2CID 152468872.
- Ruth Hall (2011). "Land Grabbing in Southern Africa: The many faces of the investor rush". Review of African Political Economy. 38 (128): 193–214. doi:10.1080/03056244.2011.582753. S2CID 154145307.
- Ruth Hall; Wendy Wolford; Saturnino M. Borras; Ian Scoones; Ben White (2013). "Governing Global Land Deals: The Role of the State in the Rush for Land". Development and Change. 44 (2): 189–210. doi:10.1111/dech.12017. hdl:10566/3197.
