= Nxuba =

Town in Eastern Cape, South Africa

Nxuba Cradock
- Town
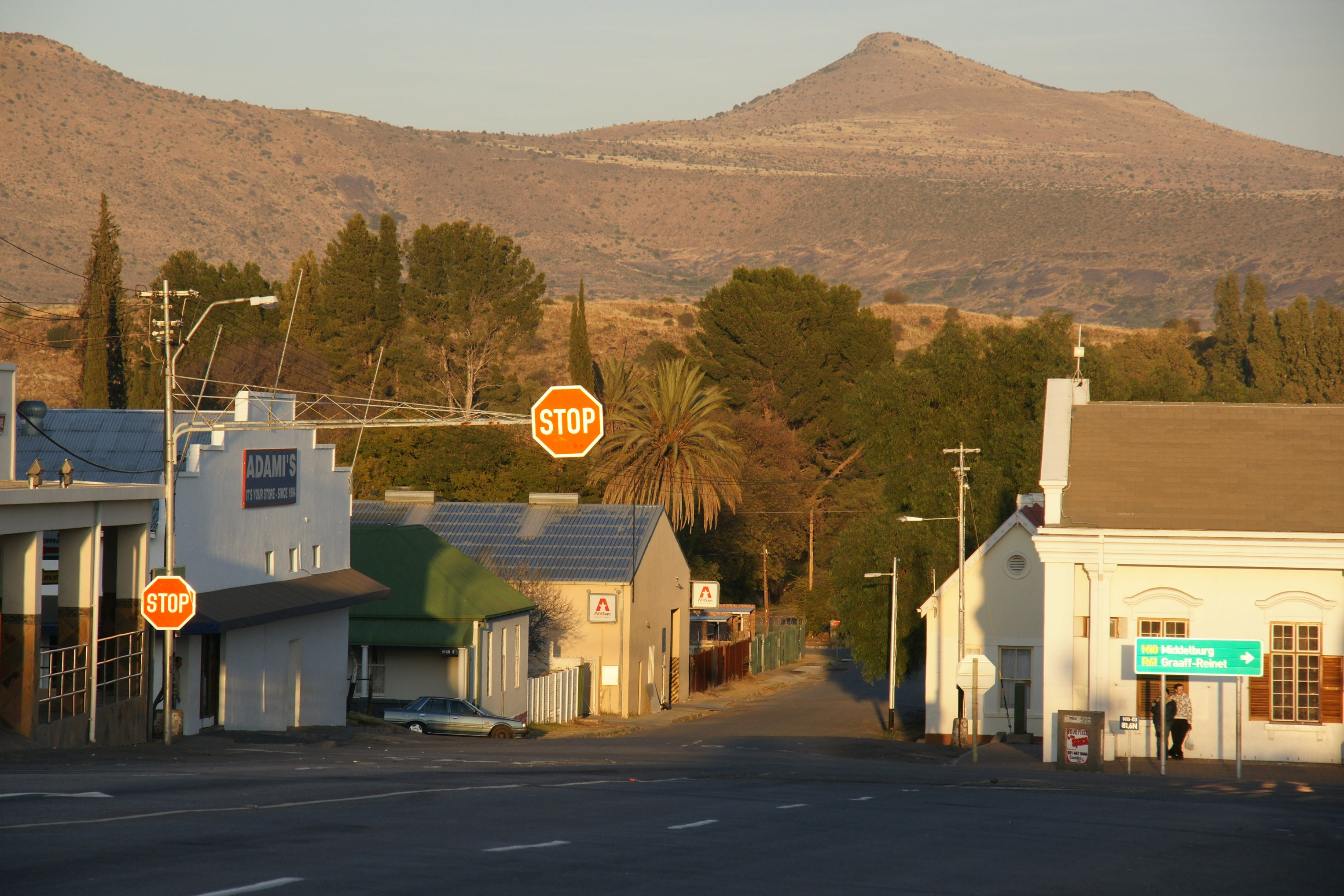
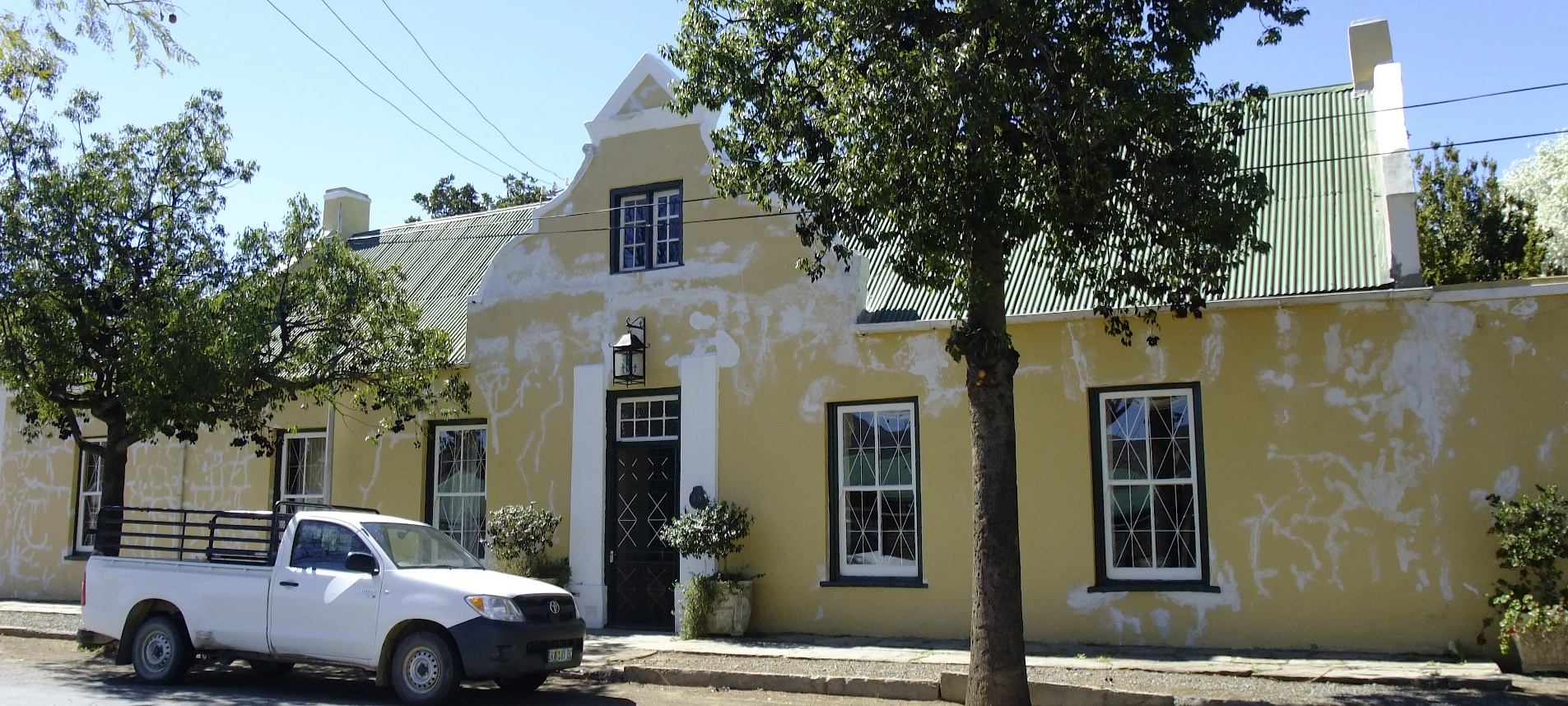
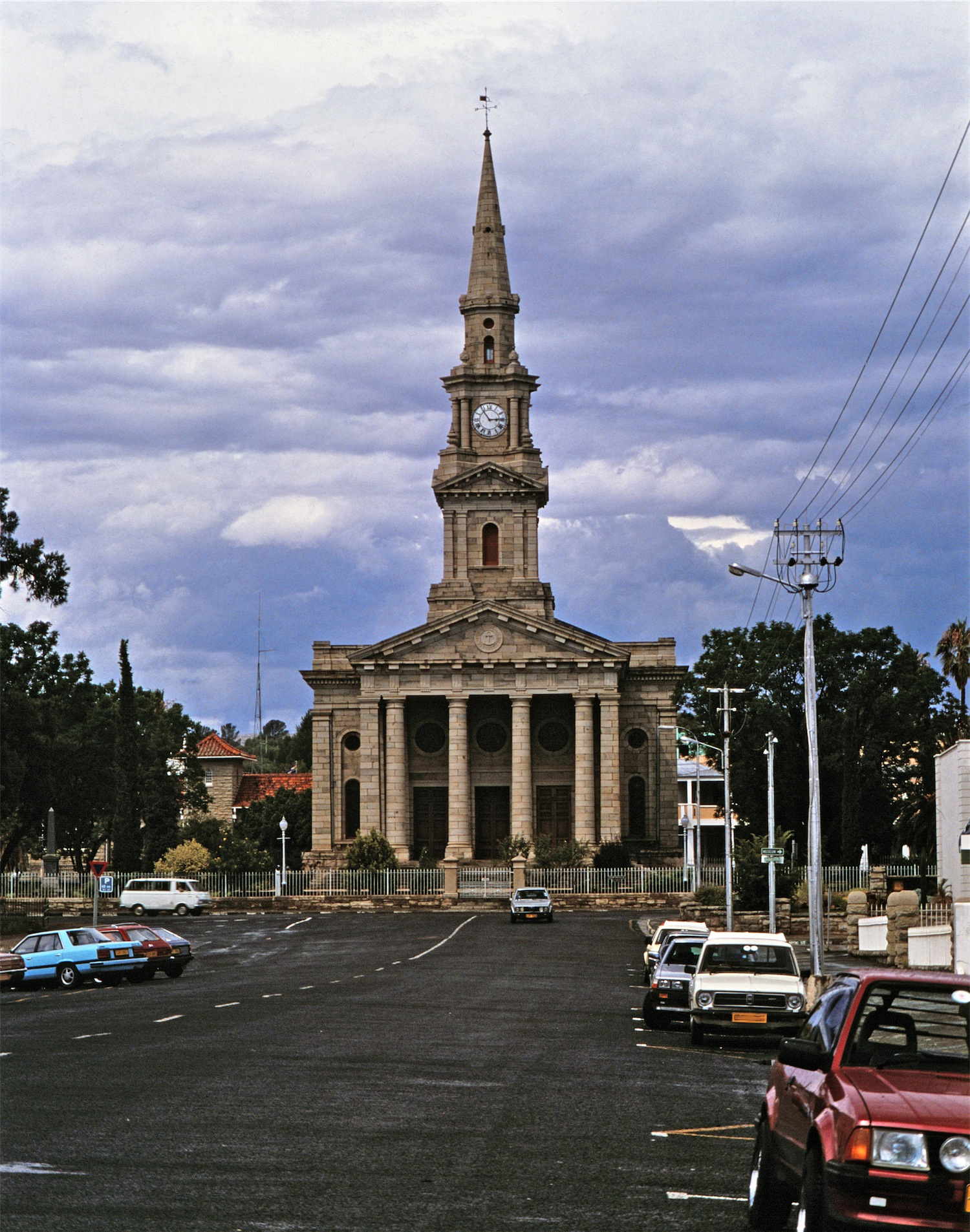
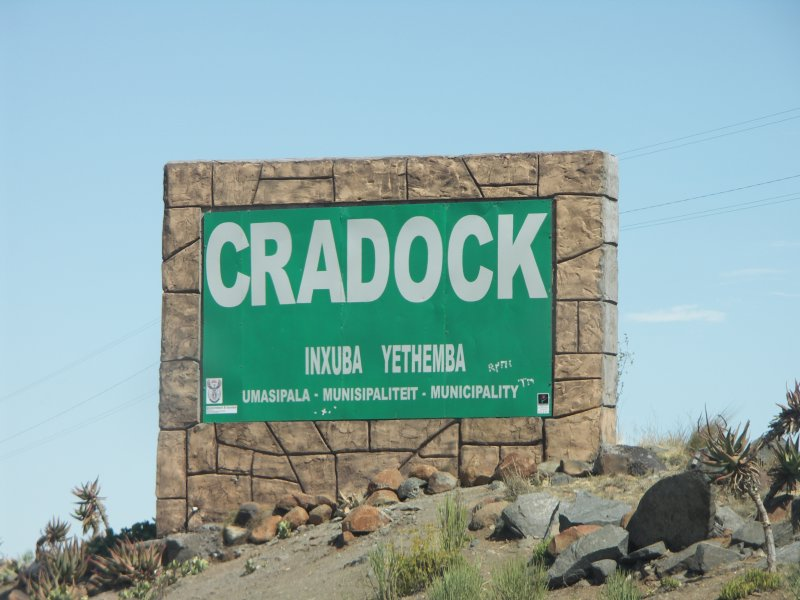
- Clockwise from top: A street in Cradock, 38 Bree Street, Dutch Reformed Church, Welcome sign

- Location within Eastern Cape Location within South Africa Location within Africa
- Coordinates: 32°09′54″S 25°37′03″E
- Country: South Africa
- Province: Eastern Cape
- District: Chris Hani
- Municipality: Inxuba Yethemba
- Established: 1816

Area
  - Total: 118.57 km^{2} (45.78 sq mi)

Population (2011)
  - Total: 8,626
  - Density: 72.75/km^{2} (188.4/sq mi)

Racial makeup (2011)
  - White: 50.0%
  - Black African: 30.5%
  - Coloured: 17.9%
  - Indian/Asian: 0.9%
  - Other: 0.7%

First languages (2011)
  - Afrikaans: 68.8%
  - Xhosa: 20.0%
  - English: 7.9%
  - Other: 2.3%
- Time zone: UTC+2 (SAST)
- Postal code (street): 5880
- PO box: 5880
- Area code: 048

Nxuba, also known as Cradock, is a town in the Eastern Cape Province of South Africa, in the upper valley of the Great Fish River, 250 kilometres (160 mi) by road north of Gqeberha. The town is the administrative seat of the Inxuba Yethemba Local Municipality in the Chris Hani District of the Eastern Cape.

The town is originally named after John Cradock, governor of the Cape Colony in early 19th century and commander of the forces.

== History ==
For thousands of years, San hunter-gatherers were the sole human inhabitants of southern Africa. About 2000 years BC the semi-nomadic Khoikhoi (or Khoekhoen or Khoikhoin) arrived with cattle, sheep and goats. These pastoralists migrated south towards the coast. Rock paintings and petroglyphs (engravings) remain as evidence of the first people who lived here.

By the 4th century AD Bantu-speaking people had begun to migrate from central Africa down the east coast into southern Africa. The amaXhosa pressed further south to the banks of the Great Fish River where they met San hunter-gatherers and Khoikhoi pastoralists, and later still Dutch and then British settlers.

=== Colonial history ===
The district surrounding Nxuba was first settled by Dutch farmers in the late 18th century, but was known long before to the hunters who illicitly crossed the frontier in search of game and ivory.

The first official Dutch expedition to the upper Great Fish River was in mid-1752 when a party led by Ensign August Frederik Beutler visited the area. Beutler, following the instructions of Governor Ryk Tulbagh to investigate the possibilities of developing the Cape's eastern regions, was accompanied by a number of other officials including a diarist, Carl Haupt, and a surveyor, Carl Wentzel, who drew a map of the route taken. Almost the only mention made about the area in the diary was that it was very dry and forage was unobtainable.

Forty five years later traveller Sir John Barrow crossed the Great Fish River. At his crossing point he noted on his map the existence beside the river of "Hepatic wells" – sulphur springs. In later years the springs were to be used for wool washing and the town's laundry.

After the 1811–12 Xhosa War, it became apparent that to maintain order along the frontier more administrative and military posts would have to be established along the Great Fish River. The district of Graaff-Reinet was too large to administer properly and the town itself too far from the river, so it was decided to set up a new sub-drostdy, and in June 1812 Ensign Andries Stockenstrom was appointed deputy landdrost. Piet van Heerden's farm Buffels Kloof beside the Great Fish River was bought for 3 500 rix dollars. One of the advantages of the purchase was that Van Heerden's stone-walled house farmhouse could serve as a prison, the first and apparently most important requirement of any town. The house also provided accommodation for a constable and two policemen.

The official proclamation appeared in the Cape Town Gazette on 21 January 1814. Sir John Cradock sanctioned an expenditure of 12 000 rixdollars on public buildings and work began at once on a house for the deputy landdrost. In addition he was allowed a farm to "render his position as comfortable and respectable as possible". The farm chosen was Driefontein, that of Piet van Heerden's brother, W J van Heerden.

In July 1817 the Reverend John Evans was appointed as first minister and he set about raising funds for a church. With minister, deputy landdrost, constable and policemen, the inhabitants could consider their tiny village well on the way to being a "town".

In the 1830s the Great Trek began, as Afrikaners who were discontent with British rule left en masse for the interior. Most of the migration departed from (and via) the area around Cradock.

The Cape Colony received a degree of independence in 1872 when "Responsible Government" was declared and, in 1877, the government of Prime Minister John Molteno sanctioned construction of a railway line connecting Port Elizabeth on the coast with the hinterland. Passing as it did through Cradock it led to significant growth and economic development in and around the town.

In the early 1900s, a boom in demand for ostrich feathers led to a massive rise in prosperity for the local ostrich farmers.

=== The Cradock Four ===
Matthew Goniwe, Sparrow Mkhonto, Fort Calata and Sicelo Mhlauli, known as The Cradock Four – were abducted while travelling from Port Elizabeth to Cradock in 1985. They were then taken to an unknown destination, where they were assaulted, killed and their bodies and the vehicle in which they were travelling burnt. Some of these incidents occurred on the night of 27 June 1985 (the night of their abduction) and some of them occurred at a later, unknown time.

Three Security Branch policemen, a Sergeant Faku, Sergeant Mgoduka, and one Sakati who participated in the killing of the activists were later killed in a car bomb blast at Motherwell in 1989.

The Cradock Four Memorial is a monument located in Lingelihle, a township near Nxuba. The monument was erected on 22 July 2000 in commemoration of the Cradock Four.

== Economy and tourism ==
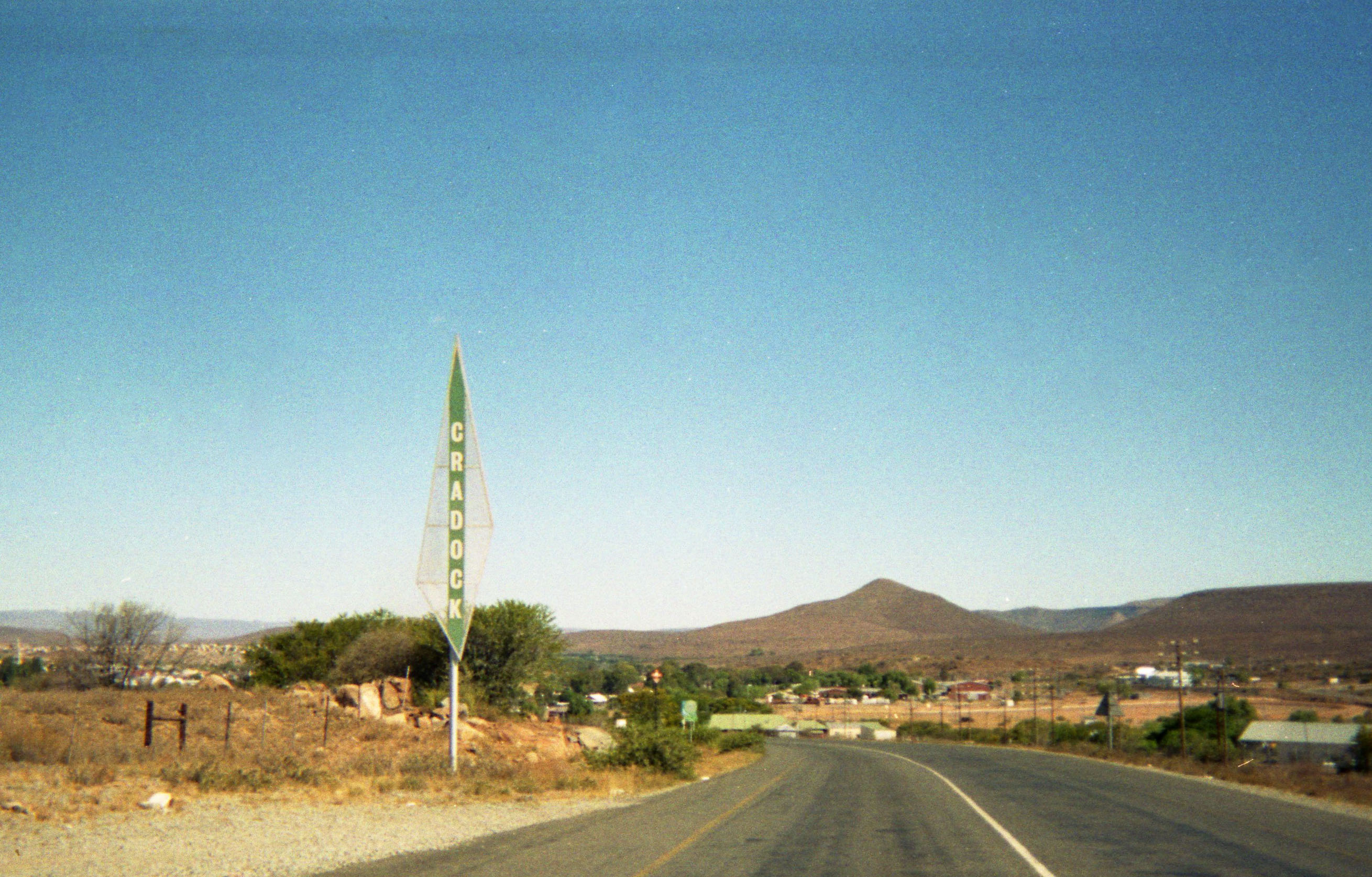
Sign on the outskirts of Nxuba

Nxuba is one of the Cape's chief centres of the wool industry, and also produces beef, dairy, fruit, lucerne, and mohair.

Of enormous importance to the economic development of Nxuba was the construction of the Orange-Fish River Tunnel. Completed in 1975 and 83 km (52 mi) in length it diverts water from the Gariep Dam on the Orange River to the Great Fish River and then on as far as the Addo Valley, Makhanda and Gqeberha for irrigation, household and industrial use.

The construction of the tunnel also made possible the annual Fish River Canoe Marathon. From humble beginnings in 1982 the two-day, 80 km (50 mi) event now attracts in excess of 1 500 paddlers from around the world.

A notable attraction is the Mountain Zebra National Park just 15 kilometres (9.3 mi) from the town, where the once-endangered zebra species together with lion, cheetah, buffalo and a range of antelope species are to be seen in specific surroundings.

Notable attractions in the town are the "tuishuise" (at-home houses), superbly restored Victorian era craftsmen's houses in Market Street which form part of the Victoria Manor Hotel; the Dutch Reformed Moederkerk which dates back to 1868 and was designed after the style of St Martin-in-the-Fields in Trafalgar Square, London; and Schreiner House where the author of The Story of an African Farm lived as a young girl. The house, which is located at 9 Cross Street and is a satellite of the National English Literary Museum, contains a modern set of exhibitions portraying the life of Olive Schreiner.

== Notable people ==
- William Faulds, Victoria Cross recipient
- General Pieter Hendrik Kritzinger, Boer general and Assistant Commandant of the Forces of the Orange Free State and Commander-in-Chief of the Boer Rebel Forces in the Cape Colony during the Second Boer War
- Douglas Gilfillan, lawyer and plant collector
- Olive Schreiner, author and human rights activist
- Guy Butler, author and poet
- Etienne van Heerden, author and poet
- Neville Alexander, author
- James Arthur Calata, cleric and activist
- Mary Ngalo, anti-apartheid activist
- Clifford Isaacs, cricket umpire
- T. O. Honiball, cartoonist
- Abe Bailey, diamond tycoon, politician, financier and cricketer
- Baby Michau, rugby player
- Sir Joseph Robinson, 1st Baronet, mining magnate
- Paul Schoeman, rugby player
- Harry Smith, cricketer
- Joshua Stander, rugby player
- Deon Stegmann, rugby player
- George Weideman, poet and writer
- Leigh Julius, athlete
- Samantha Stander, author, poet and disabled athlete

=== Politicians ===
- Fort Calata, anti-apartheid activist
- Matthew Goniwe, anti-apartheid activist
- Sicelo Mhlauli, anti-apartheid activist
- Sparrow Mkhonto, anti-apartheid activist

== Coat of arms ==
Cradock was established as a municipality in 1840. By 1902, the town council had assumed a coat of arms. The arms were formally granted by the provincial administrator in May 1966 and registered at the Bureau of Heraldry in September 1969.

The arms were: Quarterly: I, Argent, a tree Vert; II, Gules, a beehive, Or; III, Gules, a fleece Or; IV, Azure, a garb Or. In layman's terms, this means that the shield was divided into four quarters displaying (1) a green tree on a silver background, (2) a golden beehive on a red background, (3) a golden fleece on a red background, and (4) a golden wheatsheaf on a blue background.

Until 1966, the shield was flanked by two ostrich feathers. They were replaced with two mountain zebras, as supporters. The crest was a cornucopia and the motto was Perseverantia vincit.

=== Renaming ===
Cradock was officially renamed Nxuba on 26 August 2022.

== See also ==
- Beer Hall Boycott
