= Dutch Reformed Church, Cradock =

Church in Cradock, South Africa

Dutch Reformed Church
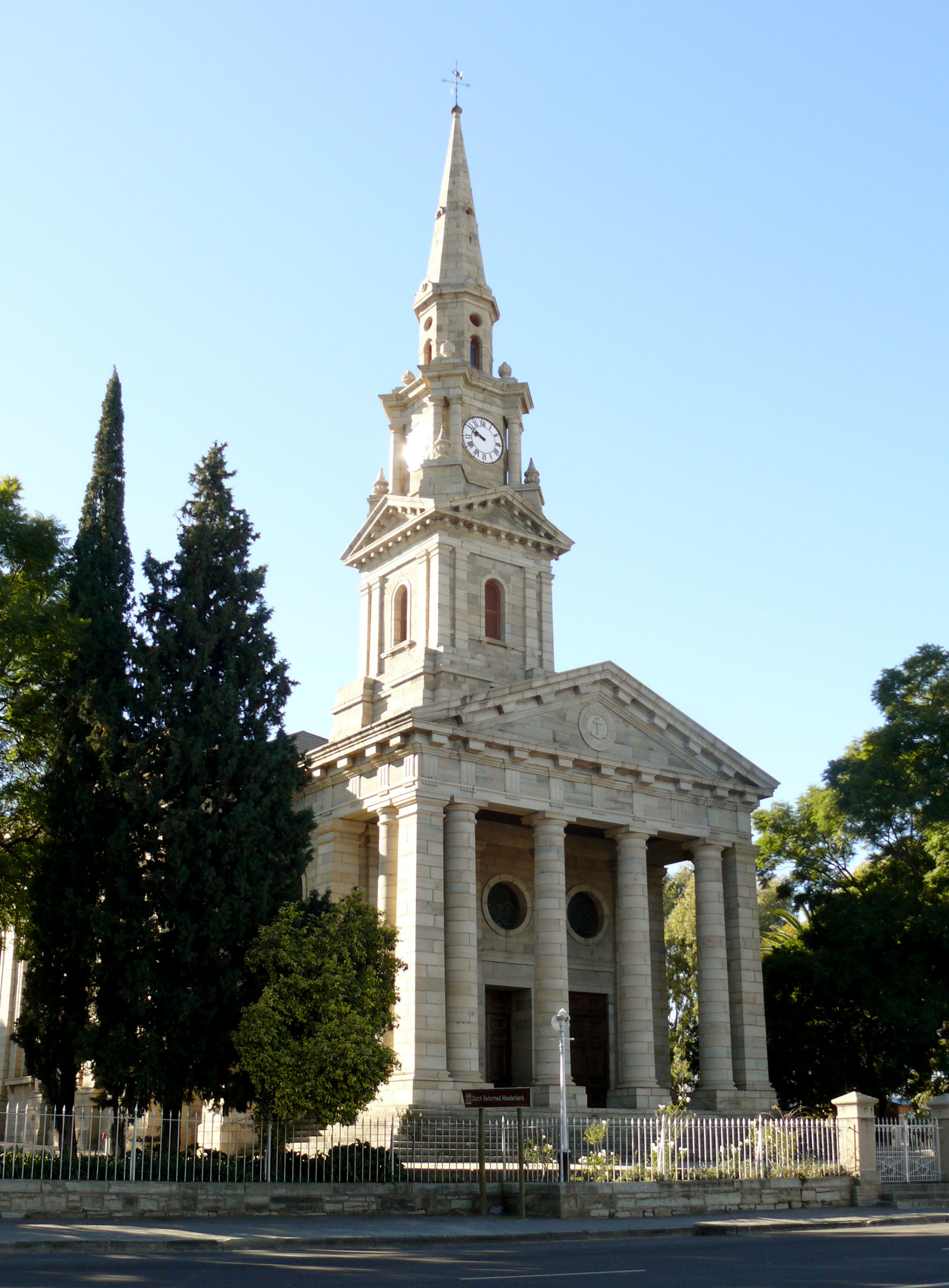
- Location: Cradock
- Country: South Africa
- Denomination: Nederduits Gereformeerde Kerk

History
- Founded: 1818

Architecture
- Functional status: Church

The Dutch Reformed Church in Cradock is the eleventh oldest congregation of the Dutch Reformed Church in South Africa and the third oldest in the Eastern Cape Synod. It is the mother congregation in the town of Cradock, where there is also a congregation in Cradock North (1966) and East (1951). The churches design is based on St Martin-in-the-Fields in London.

== Background ==
After the First Xhosa War of 1812, the soldier governor, Sir John Cradock, decided to strengthen the border by creating two sub-magistrates of Uitenhage and Graaff-Reinet that could serve as military outposts in the event of further attacks by the Xhosa. One later became Cradock and the other Grahamstown. On 20 June 1812, Andries Stockenström, later lieutenant governor of the Eastern Province, was appointed deputy magistrate at Van Stadensdam in the valley of the Great Fish River. He soon changed his station to the farm Buffelskloof, owned by Pieter van Heerden and which was particularly pleasant and strategically located near a water source.

Sir John Cradock visited the place and approved it as a location for a town. The government bought the farm for 3 500 rixdaalder, converted the homestead into a prison and also erected government buildings. It was at the suggestion of Stockenström that the new town was given the name Cradock and so it was approved on 14 January 1814.

== Sources ==
- (in English) Bulpin, T.V., 2001. Discovering Southern Africa. Cape Town: Discovering Southern Africa Publications cc.
- (in Afrikaans) Dreyer, eerw. A. 1932. Jaarboek van die Nederduits-Gereformeerde Kerke in Suid-Afrika vir die jaar 1933, Kaapstad: Jaarboek-Kommissie van die Raad van die Kerke.
- (in Dutch) Dreyer, eerw. A. 1924. Eeuwfeest-Album van de Nederduits Gereformeerde-Kerk in Zuid-Afrika 1824–1924. Kaapstad: Publikatie-kommissie van de Z.A. Bijbelvereniging.
- (in Afrikaans) Hofmeyr, George (hoofred.). 2002. NG Kerk 350. Wellington: Lux Verbi.BM.
- (in Afrikaans) Hopkins, ds. H.C. 1968. Die Ned. Geref. Kerk Cradock 1818–1968. Cradock: NG Kerkraad.
- Maree, W.L., 1984. Jaarboek 1985 van die Nederduitse Gereformeerde Kerke. Pretoria: Tydskriftemaatskappy van die Nederduitse Gereformeerde Kerk.
- (in Afrikaans) Olivier, ds. P.L. (samesteller), 1952. Ons gemeentelike feesalbum. Kaapstad en Pretoria: N.G. Kerk-uitgewers.
- (in English) Raper, P.E., 1987. A Dictionary of South African Place Names. Johannesburg: Lowry Publishers.
- (in English) Rosenthal, Eric. 1978. Encyclopaedia of Southern Africa. Cape Town and Johannesburg: Juta and Company Limited.
- (in Afrikaans) Small, Mario (samesteller), 2009. Jaarboek van die Nederduitse Gereformeerde Kerke 2010. Wellington: Tydskriftemaatskappy.
