= James Calata =

South African priest and politician (1895–1983)

The Reverend James Arthur Calata
- Born: 22 July 1895; Debe Nek, Cape Colony (now South Africa)
- Died: 16 June 1983 (aged 87); Cradock, South Africa
- Church: Anglican

James Arthur Calata OLG (1895 – 1983) was a South African priest and politician. He was the Secretary-General of the African National Congress from 1936 to 1949. He was appointed a canon of the Grahamstown Cathedral making him the first Black canon in the Anglican Church of Southern Africa.

== Early life ==
James Arthur Calata was born in Debe Nek, near King William's Town in the Eastern Cape on 22 July 1895. His father, James was an uneducated farmer and a Presbyterian. His mother Eliza, reached Standard 4, practiced as a midwife and was an Anglican. He was educated at St Matthew's College in Keiskammahoek, from 1911 to 1914 and later worked as a teacher for a number of years. He married Miltha Mary Koboka in 1918, they went on to have three daughters. He was grandfather of Fort Calata who was also a politician.

== Career ==
Calata became deacon in the Anglican Church in 1921, ordained priest in 1926, and worked briefly in Port Elizabeth, until he was sent to serve as a minister at St. James Mission in Cradock during 1928. During this time he served as president of the Inter-denominational African Ministers' Federation (IDAMF). He ministered in Cradock for forty years, then, after the removal of his congregation in the mid-1960s as a result of the Group Areas Act, he became the priest of the Church of the Ascension in the township of Lingelihle.

He joined the African National Congress (ANC) in 1930 and was elected as the Cape President from 1930 to 1949. In 1935, contracted tuberculosis, and was given two years' leave by the church. He became Secretary-General of the ANC from 1936 to 1949, in his capacity as Secretary-general he was a signatory of the 1949 Program of Action. In 1940 he was instrumental in persuading A.B. Xuma to stand for the presidency. He did not stand for re-election as secretary-general during the national conference of December 1949 but, he remained a member of the national executive until 1956. He had been chosen as ANC's senior chaplain in 1950 and he later also acted as Congress speaker.

He was banned during the Defiance Campaign in 1952, although he was later allowed to continue conducting services. In 1956 he was arrested at the time of the Treason trials and was imprisoned for a short while before being acquitted. His license to marry and permission to keep communion wine were withdrawn. During the 1960s he was restricted to the Cradock district.

His wife Miltha was a leader of those who defied apartheid laws and was later arrested. He also founded a choir, Congress Choir which he also composed songs for, that became prominent and allowed the choir to tour the Cape to raise funds for the ANC and for school bursaries.

He was a canon of Grahamstown cathedral from 1959, later during the 1960s he served on the council of St. Peter's, the Anglican College within the Federal Theological Seminary in Alice. He was kept under surveillance and lived under a banning order during 1968. In the 1970s, he allowed his home to be used as an underground library by the ANC and the youth of his community.

== See also ==
- Internal resistance to apartheid
