= Debe Nek =

- Location within Eastern Cape Location within South Africa
- Coordinates: 32.836°S 27.154°E
- Country: South Africa
- Province: Eastern Cape
- District: Amathole
- Municipality: Amahlathi

Area
  - Total: 0.74 km^{2} (0.29 sq mi)

Population (2011)
  - Total: 42
  - Density: 57/km^{2} (150/sq mi)

Racial makeup (2011)
  - Black African: 90.5%
  - Indian/Asian: 9.5%

First languages (2011)
  - Xhosa: 90.2%
  - Afrikaans: 4.9%
  - English: 4.9%
- Time zone: UTC+2 (SAST)
- Postal code (street): 5604
- PO box: 5604

Debe Nek is a village in Amahlathi Local Municipality in the Eastern Cape province of South Africa.

Debe Nek's location is 19 km northwest of King William's Town and 38 km east of Alice. Debe Nek takes its name from the Debe (Khoekhoen for 'brackish') River, from the defile ('nek') through which the Debe River flows. This was the site of the Battle of Amalinda between Ndlambe and Gaika in 1818. Presently, it functions as a health resort. The area is found in the Middledrift Road near Dimbaza
