= Dumisa Ntsebeza =

South African lawyer

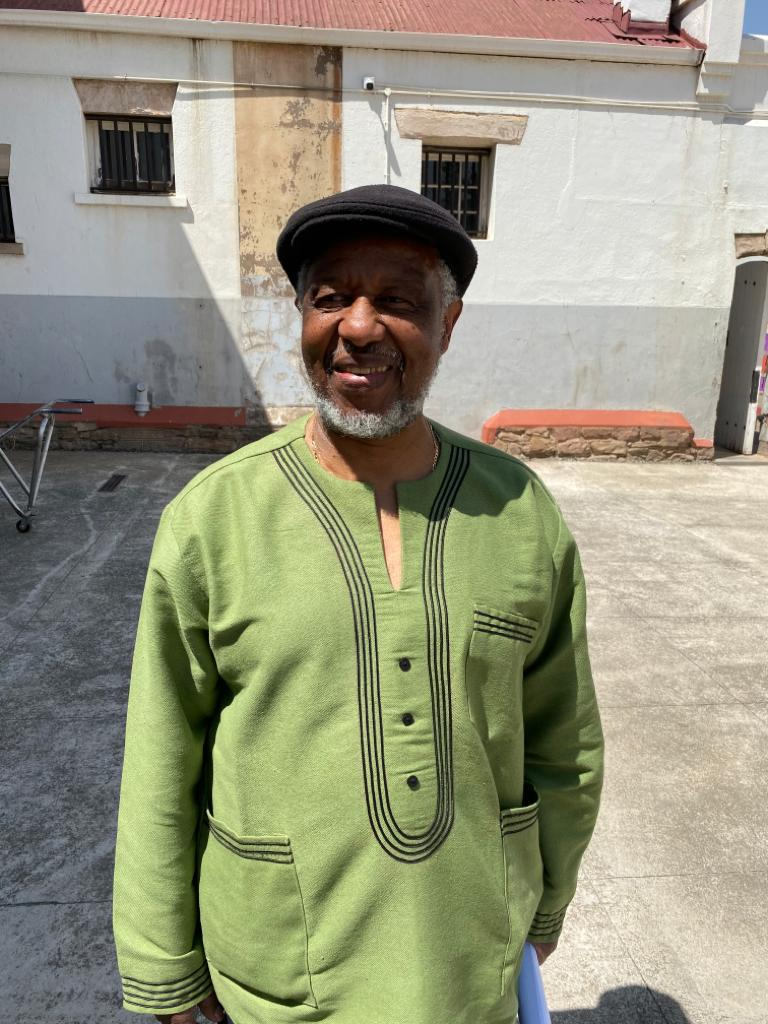
- Dumisa Ntsebeza at an event in Constitution Hill
- Born: Dumisa Buhle Ntsebeza; 31 October 1949 (age 75); Cala, Cape Province; Union of South Africa
- Occupation(s): Lawyer, author, political activist
- Relatives: Lungisile Ntsebeza (brother)

Dumisa Buhle Ntsebeza (born 31 October 1949) is a South African lawyer and political activist. He was a member of the Truth and Reconciliation Commission.

Ntsebeza was born in Cala, Eastern Cape in the former Transkei. He is the chairman of the Desmond Tutu Peace Trust and a trustee of the Nelson Mandela Foundation. He was involved in the political struggle against apartheid in the mid-1970s, when he served time in prison during which he completed his law degree. Ntsebeza was appointed chancellor of the University of Fort Hare in January 2017.

== Career ==
Ntsebeza has been in the practice of the law for over thirty years. He was an attorney for about 17 years. From 1993 he taught the law of evidence and criminal law and from 1995, human rights law at Walter Sisulu University in Mthatha. He gave up teaching when he was appointed as one of the commissioners on the Truth and Reconciliation Commission from December 1995 to January 1999. In 2005, he became the first African to be conferred silk status in the history of the Cape Bar. He practices general law, including constitutional and administrative law, labour law, mining law and land law. He has chaired a number of disciplinary actions and presided on several arbitrations. He is a trained arbitrator and qualified commercial mediator. Ntsebeza has also sat as a judge in various divisions of the high court of South Africa.

== Family ==
Professor Lungisile Ntsebeza is his brother.
