= Bluewater Bay, South Africa =

Seaside suburb in Eastern Cape, South Africa

Bluewater Bay
- Location within Eastern Cape Location within South Africa Location within Africa
- Coordinates: 33°51′24″S 25°37′46″E
- Country: South Africa
- Province: Eastern Cape
- Municipality: Nelson Mandela Bay
- Main Place: Gqeberha

Area
  - Total: 3.70 km^{2} (1.43 sq mi)

Population
  - Total: 4,530
  - Density: 1,220/km^{2} (3,170/sq mi)

Racial makeup (2011)
  - Black African: 36.29%
  - Coloured: 6.80%
  - Indian/Asian: 1.57%
  - White: 54.64%
  - Other: 0.71%

First languages (2011)
  - Afrikaans: 34.86%
  - English: 34.74%
  - Xhosa: 24.52%
  - Sesotho: 1.44%
  - Other: 1.22%
- Time zone: UTC+2 (SAST)
- Postal code (street): 6001
- PO box: 6019

Bluewater Bay is a small seaside suburb located along the Algoa Bay between Port Elizabeth (now Gqeberha) and Coega in the Eastern Cape, South Africa.

== Geography ==
Bluewater Bay is situated approximately 15 kilometres (9,3 miles) north of the city of Port Elizabeth on the mouth of the Swartkops River. Neighbouring suburbs include St Georges Strand to the north and Amsterdamhoek to the west. Notable suburbs further away include Motherwell and Markman to the north, Deal Party to the south, Swartkops to the south-west and Coega to the north-east.

=== Suburbs ===
Bluewater Bay comprises two distinct neighbourhoods, namely; Bluewater Bay and Bluewater Beach, separated by the N2 highway. As its name suggests, Bluewater Beach is situated on the seaward side of the N2 while Bluewater Bay is ironically on the inland side of the N2.

== Retail ==
Bluewater Bay is served by the N2 City Shopping Centre, which is anchored by Superspar. A Pick n Pay supermarket and an Engen service station are also located within the vicinity of the N2 City. However, due to the small size of the shopping centre the variety of goods sold is limited, and for larger shopping trips, residents need to make the short journey to nearby Port Elizabeth.

== Roads ==
Bluewater Bay is mainly reached via the N2, a major freeway running between Grahamstown (now Makhanda) in the north-west and Port Elizabeth (now Gqeberha) in the south, with an interchange at the M2 Weinronk Way. Furthermore, it can also be reached from Amsterdamhoek via the M2 which serves as the linkage between Bluewater Bay and Bluewater Beach.
