= Allan Boesak =

South African cleric and anti-apartheid activist (born 1946)

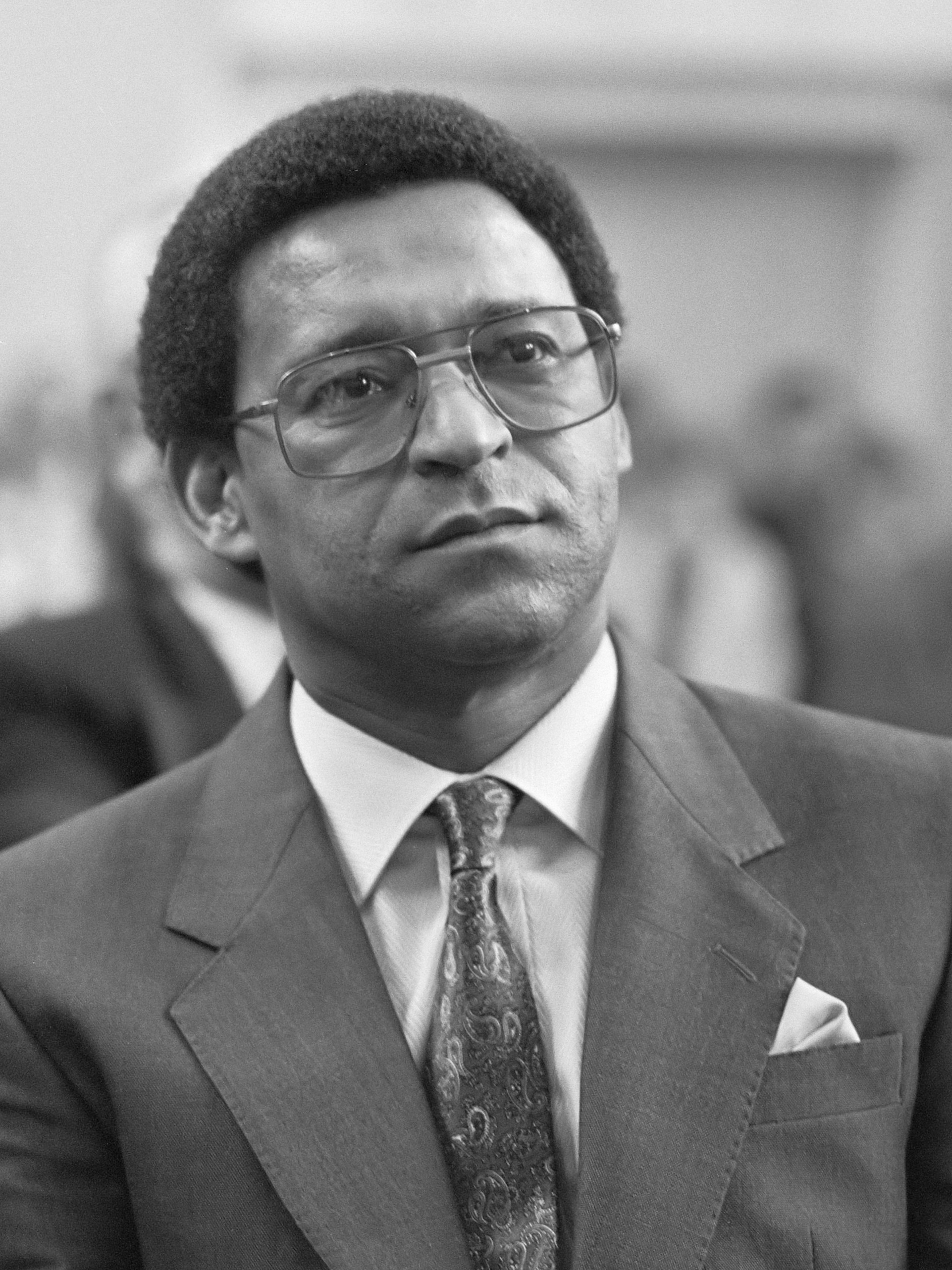
- Allan Boesak (1986)
- Title: Robert F. Kennedy Human Rights Award laureate

Personal life
- Born: 23 February 1946 (age 80) Kakamas, Northern Cape
- Spouse: Elna Botha

Religious life
- Religion: Christian
- Denomination: Nederduitse Gereformeerde Kerk

Senior posting
- Post: Desmond Tutu Chairman for Peace, Global Justice, and Reconciliation Studies
- Period in office: -1990

Allan Aubrey Boesak (born 23 February 1946) is a South African Dutch Reformed Church cleric, politician and anti-apartheid activist. He was sentenced to prison for fraud in 1999 but was subsequently granted an official pardon and reinstated as a cleric in late 2004.

Along with Beyers Naudé and Winnie Mandela, Boesak won the 1985 Robert F. Kennedy Human Rights Award given annually by the Robert F. Kennedy Center for Justice and Human Rights to an individual or group whose courageous activism is at the heart of the human rights movement and in the spirit of Robert F. Kennedy's vision and legacy.

== Theologian, cleric and activist ==
Originally from Kakamas, Boesak became active in the separate Coloured branch of the Nederduitse Gereformeerde Kerk and began to work as a pastor in Paarl. He became known then as a liberation theologian, starting with the publication of his doctoral work (Farewell to Innocence, 1976). For the next decade or so, he continued to write well-received books and collections of essays, sermons, and so on. One of Boesak's anti-apartheid speeches was sampled by British electronica group The Shamen on their album En Tact.

Boesak was elected as president of the World Alliance of Reformed Churches in 1982, a position he held until 1991.

He rose to prominence during the 1980s as an outspoken critic and opponent of the National Party's policies and played a major anti-apartheid activist role as a patron of the United Democratic Front (UDF) from 1983 to 1991. In 1991, Boesak was elected chairman of the Western Cape region of the African National Congress (ANC).

Boesak resigned from the Dutch Reformed Church in 1990 after details of an extramarital affair with television presenter Elna Botha emerged; they later married.

In 2004, Boesak came out in favour of same-sex marriage in South Africa, a year before the country's Constitutional Court ruled that the denial of marriage to gay people was discriminatory and violated the country's constitution. In 2008, while serving as the Moderator of the Cape Synod of the Uniting Reformed Church in Southern Africa, to the shock of many senior church leaders, Boesak announced that he was going to resign all of his positions within the church because of its discriminatory position on homosexuality and gay and lesbian people. He invoked the anti-apartheid 1986 Belhar Confession, which lambasts all forms of discrimination, to say that the church should welcome gays and lesbians, begin to perform gay marriage ceremonies, and appoint gay clergy.

In 2008, Boesak publicly challenged the South African leadership to remember why the country had set out to join all races and create a non-racial South Africa. In the annual Ashley Kriel Memorial Youth Lecture, he suggested that the ANC was well down the slippery slope of ethnic preferences and "had brought back the hated system of racial categorization." In December 2008 he left the ANC to join the Congress of the People Party. In reaction, the ANC leaked a memorandum written by Boesak, detailing how he had discussed different roles he could play to help the organisation and stating that his preferred choice was the post of South African ambassador to the United Nations.

The same month saw Boesak voicing his views on the Zimbabwe crisis, calling on citizens of the stricken country to rise up in opposition to President Robert Mugabe and his authoritarian ZANU-PF ruling party. He also censured Thabo Mbeki for failing in his role as the Southern African Development Community's official mediator to heed the churches' call for a peace-keeping force.

He also called for a revaluation of affirmative action, describing the way it was used in the Western Cape as "totally inexcusable".

In June 2013, Christian Theological Seminary and Butler University in Indianapolis, Indiana appointed Boesak as the Desmond Tutu Professor for Peace, Global Justice, and Reconciliation Studies, a new four-year position held jointly with both institutions.

== Controversies ==
After being replaced as the ANC party leader for Western Cape province, Boesak was compensated by Mandela with an appointment as ambassador to the United Nations in Geneva. A few weeks prior to commencing duties in this post, the first hint of corruption surfaced.

The allegation were into the use of foreign aid given to the Foundation for Peace and Justice charity setup by Boesak. The DanChurchAid (Danish Church Aid) approached Johannesburg law firm Bell Dewar to investigate the use of a $1 million donation made in 1985 (c.a. R3 million at the time) . For six weeks Boesak held out while the scandal was aired in the press. Only when the Office for Serious Economic Offences began its own investigation was he finally persuaded to resign from the foreign ministry.

A further complaint was made by Archbishop Tutu, who called in police to investigate what had happened to a donation of 423,000 rands made by the American singer Paul Simon, which Tutu had passed on to Boesak's foundation. 'We are distressed and angry', he said in a statement, 'that money ... set aside for child victims of apartheid cannot be accounted for immediately'.

After a three-month investigation, the Johannesburg law firm issued a 600-page report damning of Boesak's conduct. Boesak, the report said, had 'enriched himself substantially' by diverting funds to buy a luxury house and to pay for an inflated salary, vacations, his second wedding and his new wife's business debts. Only a quarter of the foundation's income had gone to projects intended by Scandinavian donors to help apartheid victims. Boesak's response was to deny all responsibility, to blame his staff and to claim that he was a victim of racism. It was at the start of this trial that the phrase "struggle bookkeeping" was coined. The term was used to justify struggle icons' use and abuse of international donor funding for private purposes.

Meanwhile, the government had asked one of its own legal advisers to investigate. The adviser produced a three-page report which attempted to pick holes in the law firm's report and went on to clear Boesak of misconduct. The response of the Johannesburg law firm was to describe the government report as 'preposterous' and 'absurd' and to issue an eighteen-page rebuttal, rejecting it point by point.

But without waiting for the work in progress by the Office for Serious Economic Offences to conclude, Mandela duly proclaimed Boesak innocent. 'The government has investigated the allegations against Dr Boesak and found they were baseless', he declared. He went on to praise Boesak as 'one of the most gifted young men in the country' who deserved a 'high diplomatic post'. Boesak pronounced himself vindicated, demanded a public apology from DanChurchAid and offered his services to the government.

In the resulting public controversy, Mandela and the government were accused of covering up corruption, engaging in political cronyism and undermining the course of justice. The outcry eventually died down, and Boesak did not get a government job.

Brought to trial on charges of fraud and theft regarding the donation by Paul Simon the court stated: "The court a quo found that the appellant had committed fraud by representing to the other trustees that only R423 000 was available to the Trust when in fact R682 261.21 was available. The appellant was accordingly convicted on count 4. Furthermore, the court held that the appellant stole the difference of R259 161.21. This led to his conviction on count 5. The appellant's defence to both charges, in the court a quo and in this Court, was that he, and not the Children's Trust, was entitled to receive the sum of R259 161.21."

Boesak was charged and found guilty of fraud on 24 March 1999. He was jailed in 2000 and released in 2001, having served just over one year of his three-year sentence.

Although Boesak applied for a presidential pardon from Thabo Mbeki after his release, it was not granted, as the government felt that he had not admitted that he had committed an offence. However, on 15 January 2005, it was announced that he had received a presidential pardon and that his criminal record would be expunged.

Boesak has written a book on his 30 years as an activist – Running with Horses: Reflections of an Accidental Politician – which was published in late March 2009. Boesak said that in his book he will explain why the banning of UDF affiliates meant the money could not be accounted for. Boesak declined to testify in his trial in 1999. He maintains that keeping this silence was one of the main reasons for his conviction.

== Politics ==
Boesak joined the new Congress of the People party in December 2008, and was selected in February 2009 as the party's premier candidate for the Western Cape in the 2009 Provincial and National Elections. In November 2009, Boesak resigned from Congress of the People.

== Publications ==
- Boesak, A A 1976. Farewell to Innocence: A Socio-Ethical Study on Black Theology and Black Power. Maryknoll: Orbis Books. ISBN 0-88344-130-6.
- Boesak, A A 1976. Coming Out of the Wilderness: A Comparative Interpretation of the Ethics of Martin Luther King, Jr. and Malcolm X. Kampen: J.H. Kok. ISBN 978-90242-0231-7.
- Boesak, A A 1982. The Finger of God: Sermons on Faith and Socio-Political Responsibility. Maryknoll: Orbis. ISBN 0-88344-135-7.
- Boesak, A A 1984. Black and Reformed: Apartheid, Liberation, and the Calvinist Tradition. Maryknoll: Orbis Books. ISBN 0-88344-148-9.
- Boesak, A A 1984. Walking on Thorns: The Call to Christian Obedience. Grand Rapids: Eerdmans. ISBN 978-0802-80041-1.
- Boesak, A A & C Villa-Vicencio (eds) 1986. When Prayer Makes News. Philadelphia: Westminster Press. ISBN 0-664-24035-6 [= A Call for an End to Unjust Rule. Edinburgh: Saint Andrew Press. ISBN 0-7152-0594-3]
- Boesak, A A 1987. Comfort and Protest: Reflections on the Apocalypse of John of Patmos. Philadelphia: Westminster Press. ISBN 0-664-24602-8.
- Boesak, A A 1987. If This Is Treason, I Am Guilty. Grand Rapids: Eerdmans. ISBN 0-8028-0251-6.
- Boesak, A A 2007. The Fire Within: Sermons from the Edge of Exile. Glasgow: Wild Goose Publications. ISBN 978-1-905010-38-7.
- Boesak, A A 2008. The Tenderness of Conscience: African Renaissance and the Spirituality of Politics. Glasgow: Wild Goose Publications. ISBN 978-1-905010-51-6.
- Boesak, A A 2009. Running with Horses: Reflections of an Accidental Politician. Cape Town: Joho Pub. ISBN 978-0980-27548-3.
- Boesak, A A & C P DeYoung 2012. Radical Reconciliation: Beyond Political Pietism and Christian Quietism. Maryknoll: Orbis. ISBN 978-1-57075-976-5
- Boesak, A A 2014. Dare We Speak of Hope: Searching for a Language of Life in Faith and Politics. Grand Rapids: William B. Eerdmans. ISBN 978-0-8028-7081-0.
- Boesak, A A 2015. Kairos, Crisis, and Global Apartheid: The Challenge to Prophetic Witness. New York: Palgrave Macmillan. ISBN 978-1-1375-0309-1.
- Boesak, A A 2017. Pharaohs on Both Sides of the Blood-Red Waters: Prophetic Critique on Empire: Resistance, Justice and the Power of the Hopeful Sizwe - A Transatlantic Conversation. Eugene, OR: Cascade Books. ISBN 978-1-4982-9690-8

== See also ==
- Uniting Reformed Church in Southern Africa
