= United Democratic Front (South Africa) =

1983–1991 anti-apartheid organisation

Logo of the United Democratic Front (South Africa)

The United Democratic Front (UDF) was a South African popular front that existed from 1983 to 1991. The UDF comprised more than 400 public organizations including trade unions, students' unions, women's and parachurch organizations. The UDF's goal was to establish a "non-racial, united South Africa in which segregation is abolished and in which society is freed from institutional and systematic racism." Its slogan was "UDF Unites, Apartheid Divides." The Front was established in 1983 to oppose the introduction of the Tricameral Parliament by the white-dominated National Party (NP) government, and dissolved in 1991 during the early stages of the transition to multiracial democracy.

== Background ==
Involvement in trade unions, beginning in Durban in 1973, helped create a strong, democratic political culture for black people in South Africa. Mass urban protest could also be traced to the student upsurge in Soweto in 1976.

1982 brought the effects of a world economic crisis to South Africa, and the price of gold fell in 1985. The result of these things and other economic problems caused mass unemployment, especially for young black South Africans.

The apartheid state wrote a new constitution in 1983 "in an attempt to allay criticism against apartheid and to set a new course." The new form of government created a Tricameral Parliament which allowed Cape Coloureds and Indian South Africans "nominal representation." Black people were still not allowed to participate in the government.

During a demonstration in Langa in 1984, police shot the participants which led to further insurrection. This led to a "black youth uprising" by 1985 in South Africa.

== History ==
=== Formation ===
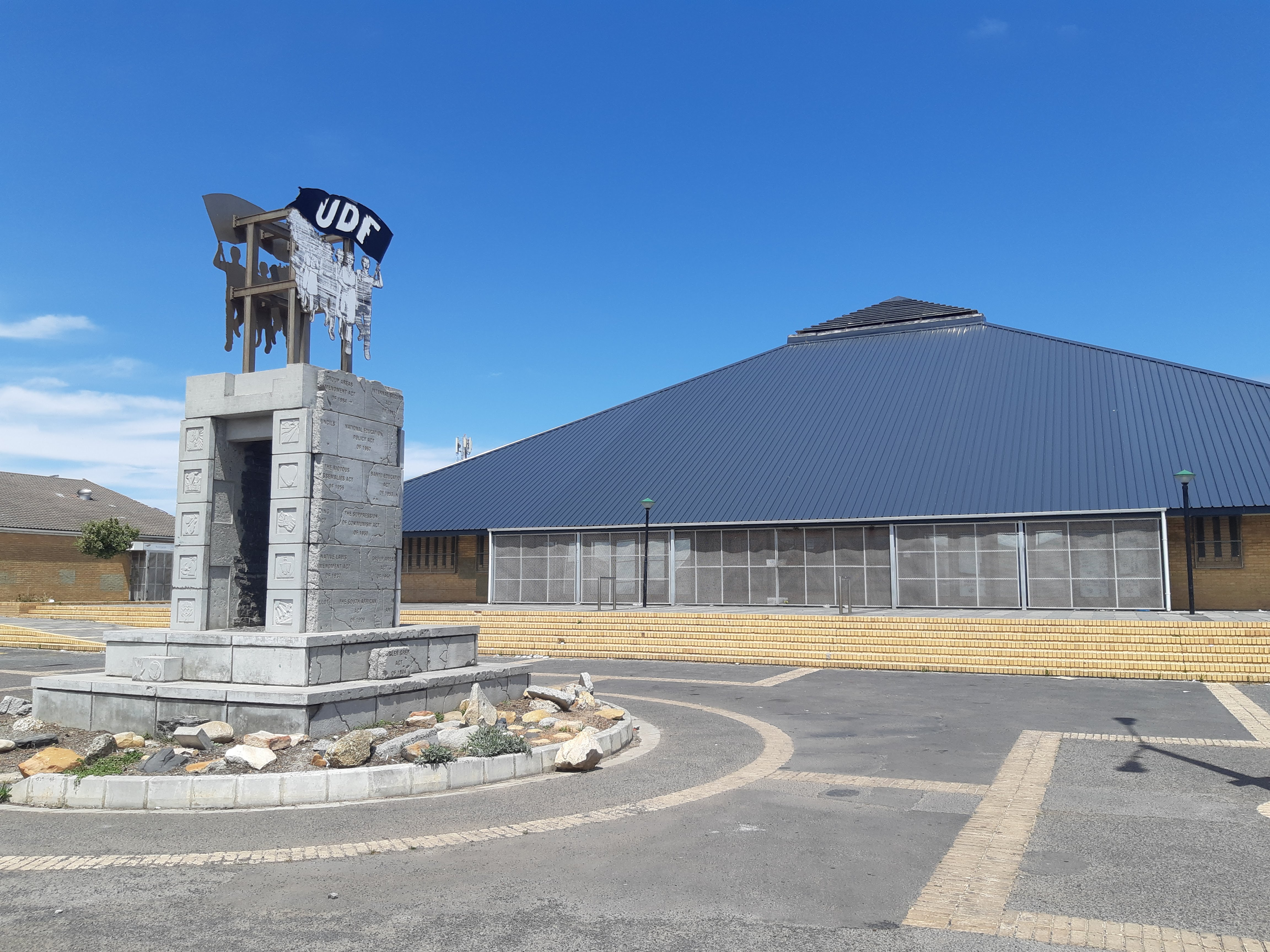
The Rocklands Community Hall where the UDF was founded in 1983. A monument memorializing the founding of the UDF can be seen in the foreground.

The plans for a new political organisation were introduced by Rev. Allan Boesak at a conference of the Transvaal Anti-South African Indian Council Committee (TASC) on 23 January 1983. The part of his speech calling for a "united front" of "churches, civic associations, trade unions, student organizations, and sports bodies" was unplanned, but well received. He also called for black people to have full participation in the government.

The UDF then formed regional committees, which established relationships with local organizations. The Natal UDF was launched first, in May, and then the Transvaal region (in June) and the Cape Province (July). Representatives of the regions formed the Interim National Committee, which also included outside activists.

At the end of July, the committee held a two-day meeting where they discussed a national launch date. Although most delegates wanted time to organise the regions before the national launch, they decided the best date was 20 August, the day the government planned to introduce the Tricameral Constitution. UDF sent out over 400,000 letters, flyers and brochures to advertise the launch of the group. The UDF's symbols – logo and slogan – were also selected at the meeting. Both the logo and slogan portray the widespread support the UDF hoped to achieve by incorporating a wide range of South Africans of all races. Some member organisations adapted the "UDF Unites, Apartheid Divides" slogan; for example, the Soweto Civic Association used "Soweto Civic Association Unites – Piet Koornhof Divides".

On 20 August 1983 the UDF was launched in the Rocklands community hall, Mitchell's Plain, near Cape Town. After a conference of delegates from 575 organisations, a public rally was held, attended by about 10,000 people. Frank Chikane, the first major speaker, called the day "a turning point in the struggle for freedom."

=== Activities of UDF ===
The UDF and its affiliates promoted rent boycotts, school protests, worker stay-away and a boycott of the tricameral system. These activities took place in earnest after September 1984.

In 1989, UDF sent delegates to the United States and the United Kingdom to discuss what foreign countries could do to help end apartheid. Women in the delegation "were the ones that dictated the conversation," with Albertina Sisulu conveying a strong message of nonviolence and compassion.

=== Banning and imprisonment ===
In 1986, President P. W. Botha prohibited the UDF from receiving foreign funds. The UDF was under a government ban as of February 1987 restricting its actions. In May 1987, a Natal provincial Supreme Court justice, John Didcott, ruled that the ban on the UDF's ability to receive foreign funding should be lifted. Foreign contributions made up more than half of the group's budget.

By late 1987, the UDF had a majority of its activists imprisoned.

=== Treason trials ===
In the aftermath of the 1984 boycotts of the Tricameral Parliament, a large number of UDF members were arrested. On 19 February 1985, several UDF members, including Albertina Sisulu, Frank Chikane and Cassim Saloojee were arrested on high treason warrants. In the following years, much of the UDF leadership was tried on high treason charges in two separate political trials, in which the state charged the UDF with being a "shadow organization for the African National Congress." While the charges in the Pietermaritzburg Treason Trial was dropped, the Delmas Treason Trial continued until 1988. In November 1988, eight of those accused of treason were acquitted of all charges, while four activists were found guilty of terrorism. The judge also ruled that the UDF was a "'revolutionary organization.' that incited violence in black townships in 1984 in a bid to render South Africa ungovernable." The convictions were overturned by the Appeal Court in Bloemfontein in 1989, releasing five activists, including Popo Molefe.

=== Disbanding ===
When the ANC, the South African Communist Party (SACP), the Pan Africanist Congress (PAC) and other organizations were unbanned in February 1990, the UDF faced a change and "it became clear that the need for the UDF no longer existed." In March 1991, the decision to disband was made and the UDF held its last meeting on 14 August 1991 in Johannesburg.

== Organisational structure ==
The UDF was an umbrella organisation that had a "federal structure" and a decentralized method of employing tactics. By 1986, there were 700 different organizations working under the umbrella which were often youth movements, community organizations, unions, professional societies and churches. Eventually there would be nearly "1,000 affiliated groups." UDF embraced a philosophy of "African nationalism, socialism and Christianity." The common goal of ending apartheid and systematic racism allowed different types of groups to work together. Any type of organization, regardless of race, sex or religion was welcome as long as they promoted an end to apartheid. UDF helped many of the smaller organizations have access to a source of funding.

The leadership structure included a National Executive Committee (NEC) at the top level which had three presidents, secretaries, a treasurer and representatives of the various regions. Despite the NEC leadership, much of the "momentum for action came from the bottom levels of the organisation and from its youngest members." Because members of UDF faced frequent arrests due to their activities, the leaders were "cautious and secretive."

=== UDF Women's Congress ===
Feminists involved in the UDF felt that the organization was not seriously promoting issues relating to women and that women "had a second-class status within the organization." The Women's Congress was formed on 23 April 1987 and included women's organizations affiliated with the UDF. Organizations, such as the Natal Organisation of Women (NOW), the Federation of Transvaal Women (FEDTRAW), Port Elizabeth Women's Organisation, Port Alfred Women's Organisation and the Gompo Women's Congress sent delegates to that first meeting. During the first meeting, the delegates created a list of issues and problems facing women involved in the UDF which included an absence of women in leadership roles and "UDF's failure to address issues of gender discrimination, and sexual harassment within the organization." Delegates elected Albertina Sisulu to the national council for the UDF Women's Congress.

In 1988, women were heavily involved in the mine worker's strike. Mostly working-class women protested the mining management's support of the government and at the rally, presented a petition. Some women attended "carrying babies on their backs."

Critics of the UDF Women's Congress believed that focusing on women's issues "had the potential to weaken the overall liberation struggle." Others disagreed, stating that "our struggle from freedom can only be won if men and women fight side by side."

=== Relationship with the ANC ===
Early in its life, the UDF adopted the Freedom Charter, a statement of the aims for a free South Africa and basis for a democratic constitution. At first, the African National Congress (ANC) did not welcome UDF's involvement.

Throughout its existence, the UDF demanded the release of imprisoned ANC leaders, as well as other political prisoners. In 1985, the UDF announced at a rally of 2,500 people, their campaign to see the release of Nelson Mandela.

However, the UDF was never formally attached to the ANC, and did not participate in the armed struggle. The UDF did not want to be associated with violent tactics or acts of sabotage against the government. In addition, the ANC over time, "showed an increasing intolerance for the values upheld by the UDF."

=== Relationship with the Black Consciousness Movement ===
The Black Consciousness Movement disagreed with the UDF on the issue of whether whites should be welcomed into the struggle against apartheid. The Black Consciousness movement was based on the principle that the liberation struggle should be led by black people, whereas the UDF welcomed anyone who shared their goals and was willing to commit to them in struggle.

=== Relationship with the Progressive Federal Party (PFP) ===
The Progressive Federal Party had vigorously opposed the introduction of the tricameral system (in the referendum), but once introduced continued as the official opposition in the "White" Assembly. "Let us voice strong opposition and offer vigorous resistance both within and without the system that excludes Blacks and continues to imprison Nelson Mandela" argued Helen Suzman, speaking at the Cape Town Conference of the PFP National Youth in 1984. At the same conference, a resolution was passed endorsing and supporting the recent establishment of the United Democratic Front and offer ' back office financial assistance". This support sponsored by Gordon Waddell and Harry Oppenheimer through the Western Province Regional PFP Youth Committee led by Stephen Drus ( Stephen Darori)

=== Mass Democratic Movement (MDM) ===
In 1989, the UDF and the Congress of South African Trade Unions (COSATU) began cooperating more closely in a loose alliance called the Mass Democratic Movement, following restrictions on the UDF and COSATU by the apartheid government. The apartheid government described the MDM as a UDF/Cosatu/SACP alliance, although this was disputed by the MDM at the time. The loose nature of the MDM made it difficult for the apartheid government to ban, and the MDM has been described as having been "the UDF in another guise".

== Notable members ==
- Albertina Sisulu
- Allan Boesak
- Andrew Boraine
- Archie Gumede
- Aubrey Mokoena
- Cassim Saloojee
- Cheryl Carolus
- Farid Esack
- Frances Baard
- Frank Chikane
- Gugile Nkwinti
- Helen Joseph
- Jeremy Cronin
- Joe Gqabi
- Maite Nkoana-Mashabane
- Matthew Goniwe
- Mewa Ramgobin
- Mkhuseli Jack
- Mohammed Valli Moosa
- Moses Chikane
- Mosiuoa Lekota
- Murphy Morobe
- Oscar Mpetha
- Popo Molefe
- Sister Bernard Ncube
- Trevor Manuel
- Victoria Mxenge
- Yunus Mohamed
