= Cultural heritage =

Physical artifact or intangible attribute of a society inherited from past generations

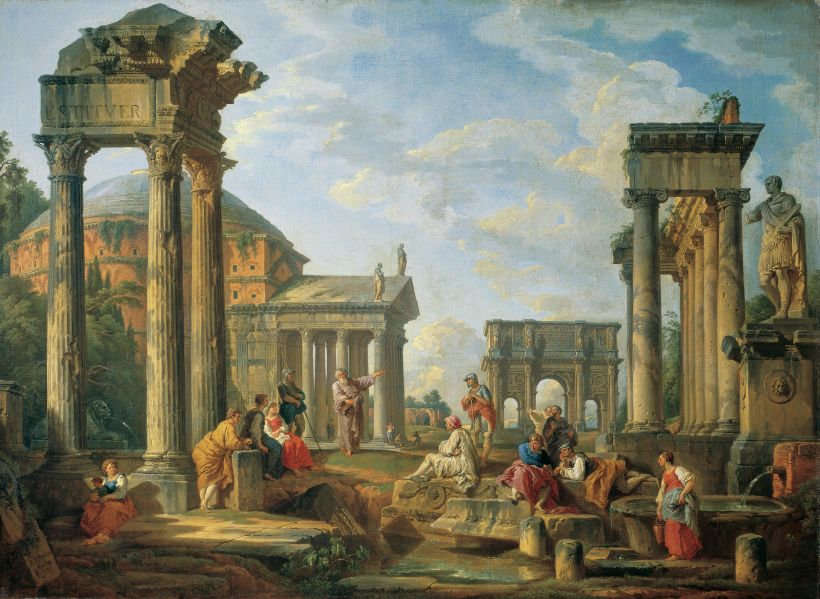
Roman ruins with a prophet, by Giovanni Pannini, 1751. The artistic cultural heritage of the Roman Empire served as a foundation for later Western culture, particularly via the Renaissance and Neoclassicism (as exemplified here).

Cultural heritage is the tangible and intangible legacy of a group or society that is inherited from past generations. Not all legacies of past generations are "heritage". Rather, heritage is a product of selection by society.

Cultural heritage includes tangible culture (such as buildings, monuments, landscapes, archival documents, books, works of art, and artifacts), intangible culture (such as folklore, traditions, language, and knowledge), and natural heritage (including culturally significant landscapes, and biodiversity). The term is often used in connection with issues related to the protection of Indigenous intellectual property.

The deliberate action of keeping cultural heritage for future generations is known as preservation in American English or conservation in British English. This concept is promoted by cultural and historical ethnic museums and cultural centers, though these terms may have more specific or technical meanings in the same contexts in the other dialect. Preserved heritage has become an anchor of the global tourism industry, a major contributor of economic value to local communities.

Legal protection of cultural property comprises a number of international agreements and national laws. United Nations, UNESCO, and Blue Shield International are involved in the protection of cultural heritage. This also applies to the integration of United Nations peacekeeping.

== Types of heritage ==
=== Cultural property ===
Cultural property includes the physical, or "tangible" cultural heritage, such as artworks. These are generally split into two groups of movable and immovable heritage. Immovable heritage includes buildings (which themselves may include installed art such as organs, stained glass windows, and frescos), large industrial installations, residential projects, or other historic places and monuments. Moveable heritage includes books, documents, moveable artworks, machines, clothing, and other artifacts, that are considered worthy of preservation for the future. These include objects significant to the archaeology, architecture, science, or technology of a specified culture.

Aspects and disciplines of the preservation and conservation of tangible culture include:

- Museology
- Archival science
- Conservation (cultural heritage)
  - Art conservation
  - Archaeological conservation
  - Architectural conservation
  - Film preservation
  - Phonograph record preservation
- Digital preservation

=== Intangible culture ===
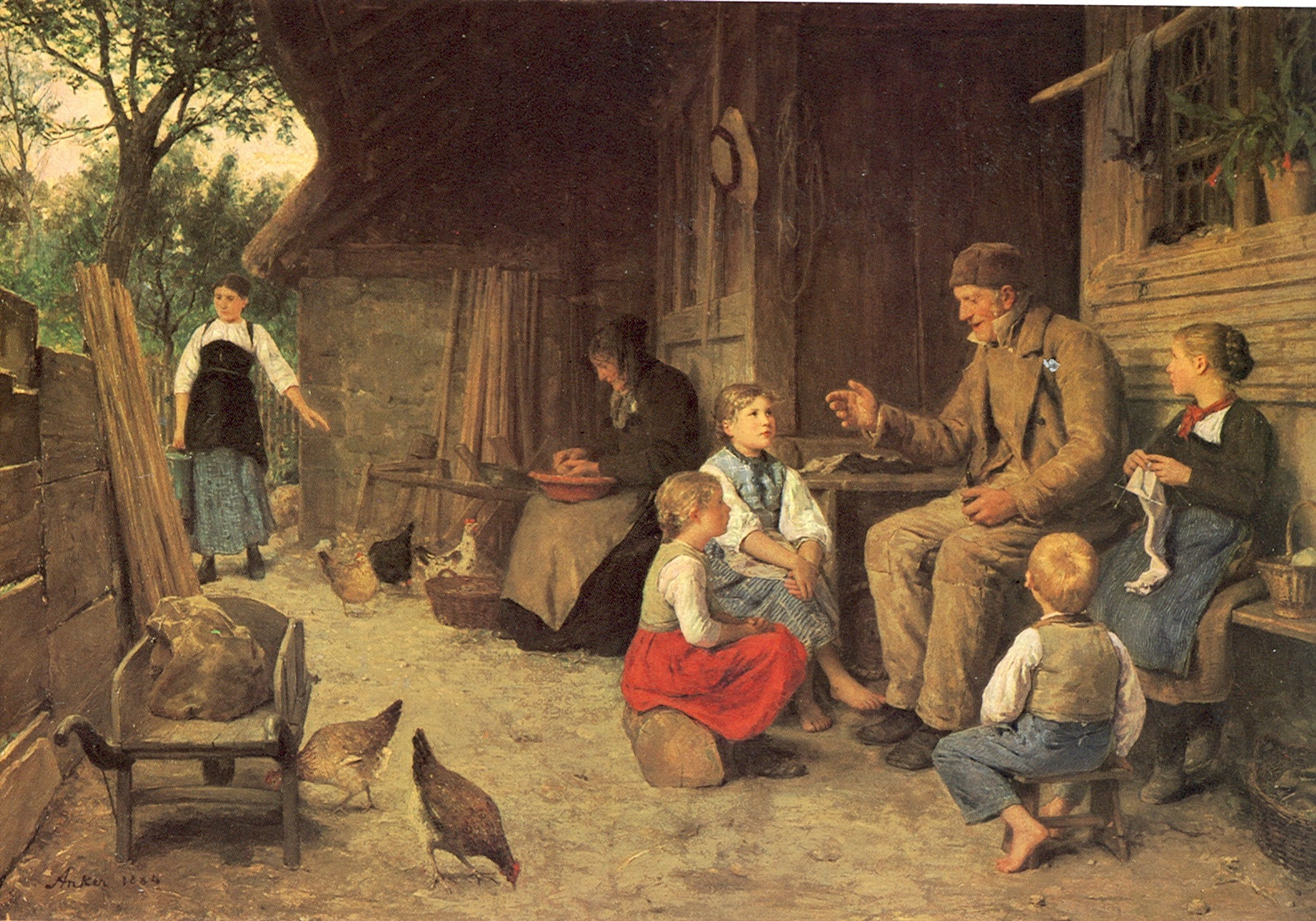
The Grandfather tells a story, by Albert Anker, c. 1884

"Intangible cultural heritage" consists of non-physical aspects of a particular culture, more often maintained by social customs during a specific period in history. The concept includes the ways and means of behavior in a society and the often formal rules for operating in a particular cultural climate. These include social values and traditions, customs and practices, aesthetic and spiritual beliefs, artistic expression, language and other aspects of human activity. The significance of physical artifacts can be interpreted as an act against the backdrop of socioeconomic, political, ethnic, religious, and philosophical values of a particular group of people. Naturally, intangible cultural heritage is more difficult to preserve than physical objects.

Aspects of the preservation and conservation of cultural intangibles include:

- folklore
- oral history
- language preservation

=== Natural heritage ===
"Natural heritage" is also an important part of a society's heritage, encompassing the countryside and natural environment, including flora and fauna, scientifically known as biodiversity, as well as geological elements (including mineralogical, geomorphological, paleontological, etc.), scientifically known as geodiversity. These kinds of heritage sites often serve as an important component in a country's tourist industry, attracting many visitors from abroad as well as locally. Heritage can also include cultural landscapes (natural features that may have cultural attributes).

Aspects of the preservation and conservation of natural heritage include:

- Rare breeds conservation
- Heirloom plants

=== Digital heritage ===
Digital heritage is made up of computer-based materials such as texts, databases, images, sounds and software being retained for future generations. Digital heritage includes physical objects such as documents which have been digitized for retention and artifacts which are "born digital", i.e. originally created digitally and having no physical form.

Digital heritage also encompasses visual identity records, including the preservation of brand trademarks and logo evolution. These elements contribute to cultural memory by documenting how visual symbols change over time and how they reflect social, commercial and technological development. Such archives help illustrate historical continuity in branding, providing reference points for researchers and design historians. A recent study used high‑resolution photogrammetry and 3D scanning to analyse Graeco‑Roman funerary masks, showing how digital methods can help reconstruct and document fragmented cultural artefacts.

== Protection of cultural heritage ==
=== History ===
There have been examples of respect for the cultural assets of enemies since ancient times. The roots of today's legal situation for the precise protection of cultural heritage also lie in some of the regulations of Austria's ruler Maria Theresa (1717 - 1780) and the demands of the Congress of Vienna (1814/15) not to remove works of art from their place of origin in the war. The 1863 Lieber code, a military legal code governing the wartime conduct of the Union Army also set rules for the protection of cultural heritage. The process continued at the end of the 19th century when, in 1874 (in Brussels), at least a draft international agreement on the laws and customs of war was agreed. 25 years later, in 1899, an international peace conference was held in the Netherlands on the initiative of Tsar Nicholas II of Russia, with the aim of revising the declaration (which was never ratified) and adopting a convention. The Hague Conventions of 1899 and 1907 also significantly advanced international law and laid down the principle of the immunity of cultural property. Three decades later, in 1935, the preamble to the Treaty on the Protection of Artistic and Scientific Institutions (Roerich Pact) was formulated. On the initiative of UNESCO, the Hague Convention for the Protection of Cultural Property in the Event of Armed Conflict was signed in 1954.

Protection of cultural heritage or protection of cultural goods refers to all measures aimed at protecting cultural property against damage, destruction, theft, embezzlement, or other loss. The term "monument protection" is also used for immovable cultural property. Protection of cultural heritage relates in particular to the prevention of robbery digs at archaeological sites, the looting or destruction of cultural sites and the theft of works of art from churches and museums all over the world and basically measures regarding the conservation and general access to our common cultural heritage. Legal protection of cultural heritage comprises a number of international agreements and national laws.

There is a close partnership between the UN, United Nations peacekeeping, UNESCO, the International Committee of the Red Cross and Blue Shield International.

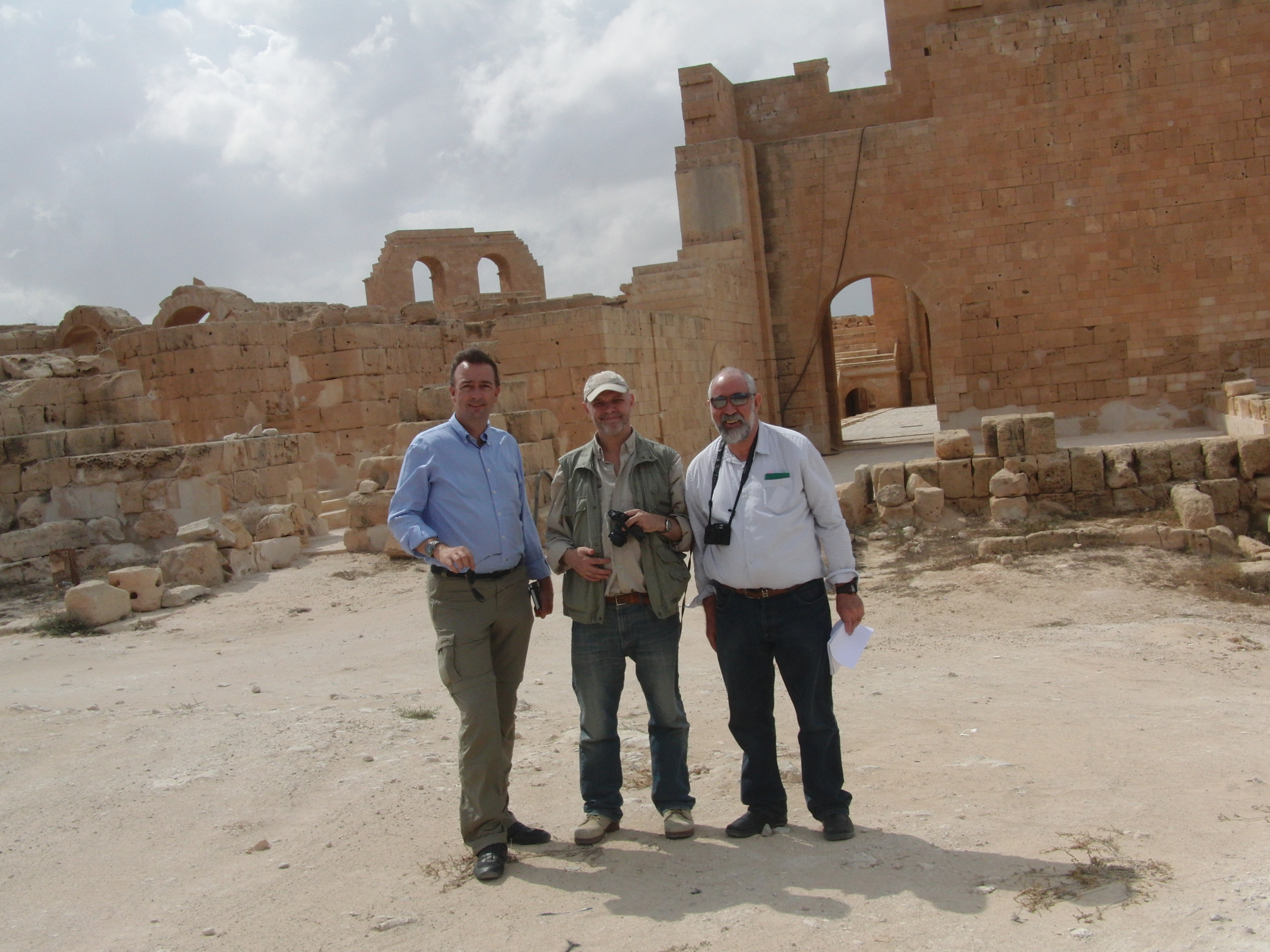
Karl von Habsburg, on a Blue Shield International fact-finding mission in Libya

The protection of cultural heritage should also preserve the particularly sensitive cultural memory, the growing cultural diversity, and the economic basis of a state, a municipality, or a region. Whereby there is also a connection between cultural user disruption or cultural heritage and the cause of flight. But only through fundamental cooperation, including the military units and the planning staff, with the locals can the protection of world heritage sites, archaeological finds, exhibits, and archaeological sites from destruction, looting, and robbery be implemented sustainably. The founding president of Blue Shield International Karl von Habsburg summed it up with the words: "Without the local community and without the local participants, that would be completely impossible".

== Ethics and rationale ==
Objects are a part of the study of human history because they provide a concrete basis for ideas, and can validate them. Their preservation demonstrates a recognition of the necessity of the past and of the things that tell its story. In The Past is a Foreign Country, David Lowenthal observes that preserved objects also validate memories. While digital acquisition techniques can provide a technological solution that is able to acquire the shape and the appearance of artifacts with unprecedented precision in human history, the actuality of the object, as opposed to a reproduction, draws people in and gives them a literal way of touching the past. This poses a danger as places and things are damaged by the hands of tourists, the light required to display them, and other risks of making an object known and available. The reality of this risk reinforces the fact that all artifacts are in a constant state of chemical transformation so that what is considered to be preserved is actually changing – it is never as it once was. Similarly changing is the value each generation may place on the past and on the artifacts that link it to the past. Cultural heritage is addressed not only through preservation and conservation practices, but also through policy, governance, and Cultural Planning frameworks at the municipal and regional level.

The equality or inseparability of cultural preservation and the protection of human life has been argued by several agencies and writers, for example, former French president François Hollande stated in 2016

Our responsibility is to save lives and also to save the stones -- there is no choice to be made, because today both are destroyed.

Kautilya Society in Varanasi - When heritage protection becomes a fight for legality and participation → "They harass me because I demand civil society participation to public policies and I contrast the misuse of privileges"

Classical civilizations, especially Indian, have attributed supreme importance to the preservation of tradition. Its central idea was that social institutions, scientific knowledge, and technological applications need to use a "heritage" as a "resource". Using contemporary language, we could say that ancient Indians considered, as social resources, both economic assets (like natural resources and their exploitation structure) and factors promoting social integration (like institutions for the preservation of knowledge and for the maintenance of civil order). Ethics considered that what had been inherited should not be consumed, but should be handed over, possibly enriched, to successive generations. This was a moral imperative for all, except in the final life stage of sannyasa.

What one generation considers "cultural heritage" may be rejected by the next generation, only to be revived by a subsequent generation.

Recent research based on communities in Bradford has explored the importance of identity and the role of heritage and culture for wellbeing, community cohesion and resilience.

== World heritage movement ==
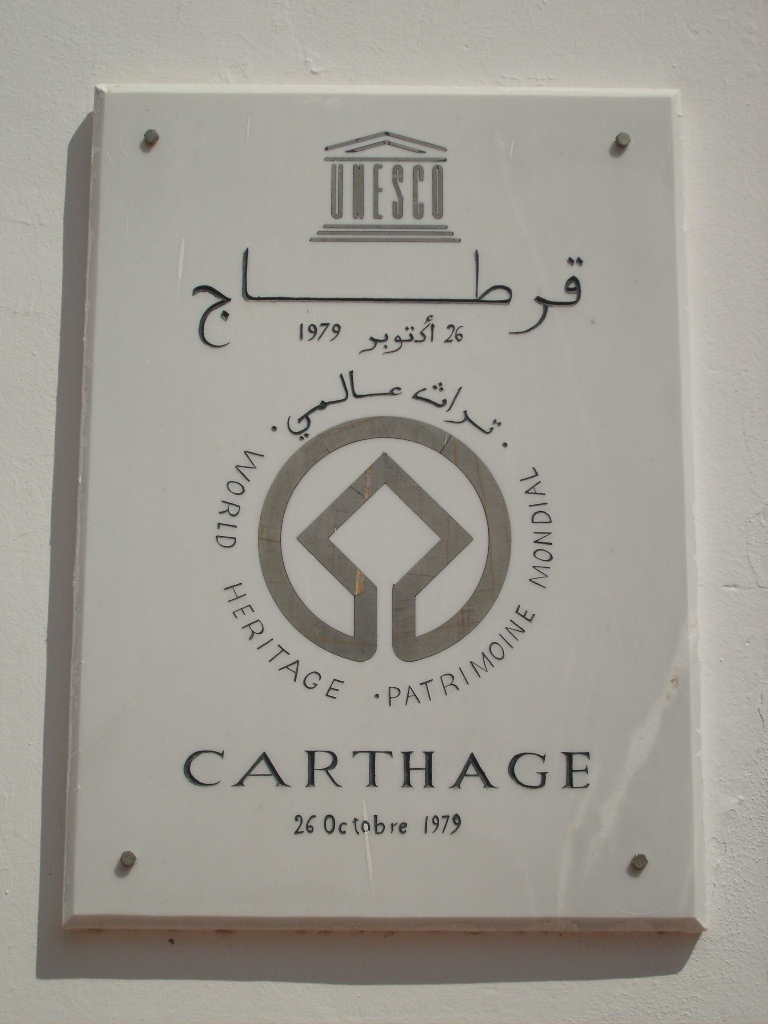
Plaque stating the designation of Carthage as a World Heritage Site

The Convention Concerning the Protection of World Cultural and Natural Heritage was adopted by the General Conference of UNESCO in 1972. As of 2011, there are 936 World Heritage Sites: 725 cultural, 183 natural, and 28 mixed properties, in 153 countries. Each of these sites is considered important to the international community.

Underwater cultural heritage is protected by the UNESCO Convention on the Protection of the Underwater Cultural Heritage.

In addition, UNESCO has begun designating masterpieces of the Oral and Intangible Heritage of Humanity. The Committee on Economic, Social and Cultural Rights sitting as part of the United Nations Economic and Social Council with article 15 of its Covenant had sought to instill the principles under which cultural heritage is protected as part of a basic human right.

Key international documents and bodies include:

- Athens Charter, 1931
- Roerich Pact, 1935
- Hague Convention for the Protection of Cultural Property in the Event of Armed Conflict, 1954, (with a definition of cultural heritage item adopted by some national law)
- Venice Charter, 1964
- Barcelona Charter, 2002 (regarding maritime vessel preservation)
- ICOMOS
- The Blue Shield, a network of committees of dedicated individuals across the world that is "committed to the protection of the world's cultural property, and is concerned with the protection of cultural and natural heritage, tangible and intangible, in the event of armed conflict, natural- or human-made disaster."
- International Institute for Conservation

The U.S. Government Accountability Office issued a report describing some of the United States' cultural property protection efforts.

In the last decades some of the most important heritage scholars have created the open heritage movement.

== National and regional heritage movements ==
Rediscovery of the Muisca Indigenous Heritage El redescubrimiento de la tradición indígena

Youth and Heritage in Syria Passing on traditional values

Much of heritage preservation work is done at the national, regional, or local levels of society. Various national and regional regimes include:

- Australia:

Burra Charter
Heritage Overlay in Victoria, Australia

- Bosnia

KONS

- Brazil:

National Institute of Historic and Artistic Heritage

- Canada

Heritage conservation in Canada

- Chile

National Monuments Council (Chile)

- China

State Administration of Cultural Heritage

- Egypt

Supreme Council of Antiquities

- Estonia

Ministry of Culture (Estonia)
National Heritage Board (Estonia)

- Ghana

Ghana's material cultural heritage

- Honduras

Secretary of State for Culture, Arts and Sports

- Hong Kong

Heritage conservation in Hong Kong

- India

Ministry of Culture (India)
National Archives of India
Archaeological Survey of India
Anthropological Survey of India
Culture of India
Indian National Trust for Art and Cultural Heritage
National Museum Institute of the History of Art, Conservation and Museology
List of World Heritage Sites in India
Heritage structures in Hyderabad

- Iran

Cultural Heritage, Handcrafts and Tourism Organization

- Japan

Cultural Properties of Japan

- Kenya

National Museums of Kenya
International Inventories Programme

- North Macedonia

Institute for Protection of Cultural Monuments

- Malaysia

The National Heritage Act

- Namibia

National Heritage Council of Namibia
National Monuments Council

- New Zealand

New Zealand Historic Places Trust

- Pakistan

Lahore Museum of Art and Cultural History
Lok Virsa Heritage Museum
National Museum of Pakistan
Pakistan Monument and Heritage Museum

- Philippines

National Commission for Culture and the Arts
National Historical Commission of the Philippines

- Poland

National Ossoliński Institute

- Serbia

Immovable Cultural Heritage of Exceptional Importance
Immovable Cultural Heritage of Great Importance

- South Africa

South African Heritage Resources Agency
Provincial heritage resources authorities
Amafa aKwaZulu-Natali
Heritage Western Cape
Northern Cape Heritage Resources Authority
National Monuments Council
Historical Monuments Commission

- United Kingdom

Conservation in the United Kingdom
English Heritage
English Heritage Archive
National Trust
Cadw
Northern Ireland Environment Agency
Historic Environment Scotland
National Trust for Scotland

- United States of America

National Park Service

National Register of Historic Places
National Historic Site (United States)
List of national memorials of the United States
National Military Park

- Zambia

National Heritage Conservation Commission

National Museums Board

- Zimbabwe

National Monuments of Zimbabwe

== Issues in cultural heritage ==
Emblem used to clearly identify cultural property under protection of the Hague Convention of 1954, regarding cultural property during armed conflicts

Broad philosophical, technical, and political issues and dimensions of cultural heritage include:

- Cultural heritage repatriation
- Cultural heritage management
- Cultural property law
- Heritage tourism
- Virtual heritage
- Sustainable preservation
- Climate change and World Heritage

== Management of cultural heritage ==
Issues in cultural heritage management include:

- Exhibition of cultural heritage objects
- Radiography of cultural objects
- Storage of cultural heritage objects
- Collections maintenance
- Disaster preparedness
- Cultural planning

== Cultural heritage digital preservation ==
Ancient archaeological artefacts and archaeological sites are naturally prone to damage due to their age and environmental conditions. Also, there have been tragic occurrences of unexpected human-made disasters, such as in the cases of a fire that took place in the 200 years old National Museum of Brazil and the UNESCO World Heritage Site of the Notre Dame Cathedral in Paris.

Therefore, there is a growing need to digitize cultural heritage in order to preserve them in the face of potential calamities such as climate change, natural disaster, poor policy or inadequate infrastructure. For example, the Library of Congress has started to digitize its collections in a special program called the National Digital Library Program. The Smithsonian has also been actively digitizing its collection with the release of the "Smithsonian X 3D Explorer," allowing anyone to engage with the digitized versions of the museum's millions of artifacts, of which only two percent are on display.

3D scanning devices used for heritage preservation produce a high-precision digital reference model that not only digitizes condition but also provides a 3D virtual model for replication. The high cost and relative complexity of 3D scanning technologies made it quite impractical in the past, but technology advances and lower relative costs have made even mobile based scanning applications able to create a virtual museum.

There is still a low level of digital archiving of archaeological data obtained via excavation, even in the UK where the lead digital archive for archaeology, the Archaeology Data Service, was established in the 1990s. Across the globe, countries are at different stages of dealing with digital archaeological archives, all dealing with differences in statutory requirements, and legal ownership of archives and infrastructure.

== See also ==
- Antiquarian
- Architectural Heritage (academic journal)
- Collecting
- Heritage film
- Values (heritage)

=== Digital methods in preservation ===
- DigiCULT
- ERPANET
- Intellectual property issues in cultural heritage (IPinCH)
