= List of heritage sites in South Africa =

This is a list of national and provincial heritage sites in South Africa, as declared by the South African Heritage Resources Agency (SAHRA) and the nine provincial heritage resources authorities. SAHRA maintains the list through an online, publicly accessible database, the South African Heritage Resources Information System (SAHRIS), which also serves as an integrated national heritage resources management tool.

== World Heritage Sites ==

- Cape Floral Region Protected Areas
- Fossil Hominid Sites of Sterkfontein, Swartkrans, Kromdraai, and Environs
- iSimangaliso Wetland Park
- Mapungubwe Cultural Landscape
- Richtersveld Cultural and Botanical Landscape
- Robben Island
- Maloti-Drakensberg Park
- Vredefort Dome

== National heritage sites ==
- Peanut Farm
- Boschendal
- Cape Blue whale Cultural Landscape
- Super man Cave
- Drimolen
- Charlotte Maxeke Grave
- Gladysvale
- Gondolin, Broederstroom
- Kaditshwene Cultural landscape
- Kromdraai fossil site
- Madiba House (inside Drakenstein Correctional Centre)
- Makapans Valley and Limeworks at Makapansgat
- Mapungubwe
- Motsetsi
- Non Pareille
- Plovers Lake
- Robben Island
- Royal Observatory, Cape of Good Hope.
- Sarah Baartman Site
- SAS Pietermaritzburg
- Sterkfontein caves
- Swartkrans Palaeontological Site
- Union Buildings
- Voortrekker Monument
- Wonderwerk Cave

== Lists of South African provincial heritage sites ==
The lists have been split up by province. Some districts have been split off from their province for site performance reasons.

- List of heritage sites in Eastern Cape
- List of heritage sites in Albany
- List of heritage sites in Graaff-Reinet
- List of heritage sites in Port Elizabeth
- List of heritage sites in Free State
- List of heritage sites in Gauteng
- List of heritage sites in KwaZulu-Natal
- List of heritage sites in Pietermaritzburg
- List of heritage sites in Limpopo
- List of heritage sites in Mpumalanga
- List of heritage sites in North West
- List of heritage sites in Northern Cape
- List of heritage sites in Colesberg
- List of heritage sites in Kimberley
- List of heritage sites in Richmond
- List of heritage sites in Victoria West
- List of heritage sites in Western Cape
- List of heritage sites in Paarl
- List of heritage sites in Simonstown
- List of heritage sites in Stellenbosch
- List of heritage sites in Swellendam
- List of heritage sites in Table Mountain
- List of heritage sites in the Cape
- List of heritage sites in Tulbagh
- List of heritage sites in Worcester
- List of heritage sites in Wynberg

== See also ==
- South African Heritage Resources Agency
- Heritage Western Cape
- National heritage sites (South Africa)
- Provincial heritage site (South Africa)
- Heritage objects (South Africa)
- National Monuments Council (South Africa and Namibia)
