= Provincial heritage resources authority =

Type of South African government agency

A provincial heritage resources authority (PHRA) (phonetic pronunciation: prɑː) is a government agency established at provincial level in South Africa and is responsible for the management of immovable heritage (i.e., places enjoying protection in terms of heritage legislation). In some instances, they are also responsible for moveable heritage, interpretation centres and museums.

== History ==
Prior to the coming into effect of South Africa's National Heritage Resources Act on 1 April 2000, heritage matters were managed by a single agency at national level, the National Monuments Council. This agency was best known for its protection of several thousand 'national monuments', responsibility for which the new legislation devolved to provincial level and renamed 'provincial heritage sites', the term used in most provinces to describe them.

== Establishment ==
'Provincial heritage resources authority' or 'PHRA' is the term used by the National Heritage Resources Act to describe an authority responsible for management of what the Act describes as the 'national estate' in a province. The Act establishes three grades of heritage resource which broadly indicate significance at national, provincial and local level. The national heritage resources authority, SAHRA is responsible for Grade I heritage resources whilst PHRAs are responsible for Grade II heritage resources and in most instances also those at Grade III level since few municipalities have been assessed as competent to manage the national estate and given delegations to do so.

The three tier system of heritage management stems from provisions of South Africa's 1996 Constitution which determines that heritage conservation is a shared competency of the national and provincial spheres of government. Local government can hence only take on such responsibility if it does so voluntarily.

Each of the nine provinces has established a PHRA, with most of them electing to do so under provisions of the National Heritage Resources Act. Only the KwaZulu-Natal and Northern Cape PHRA's are set up in terms of legislation at provincial level. KwaZulu-Natal has the oldest PHRA predating the passing of the National Heritage Resources Act. In the Northern Cape the PHRA was initially set up in terms of the National Heritage Resources Act, but in 2014 provincial legislation was passed. The government of the Eastern Cape Province initially set up a PHRA under provincial legislation, but in 2012 reestablished it in terms of the national Act.

All PHRAs are public entities in terms of South Africa's Public Finance Management Act

=== List of provincial heritage resources authorities ===
- Eastern Cape Province: Eastern Cape Provincial Heritage Resources Authority
- Free State Province: Heritage Free State
- Gauteng Province: Provincial Heritage Resources Authority Gauteng
- KwaZulu-Natal Province: Amafa aKwaZulu-Natali
- Limpopo Province: Limpopo Heritage Resources Authority
- Mpumalanga Province: Mpumalanga Provincial Heritage Resources Authority
- North West Province: North West Provincial Heritage Resources Authority
- Northern Cape Province: Northern Cape Heritage Resources Authority
- Western Cape Province: Heritage Western Cape

== Powers ==
=== Protections ===
PHRAs are able to exercise the bulk of the powers to protect heritage resources set out in Chapter II of the National Heritage Resources Act. These are divided into two types, 'Formal Protections' which require a specific action by a heritage resources authority to designate, usually by notice in a government gazette, and 'General Protections' which apply without the need for specific action and which usually apply by virtue of the age of the heritage resources concerned.

=== Types of heritage resource ===
PHRAs are generally responsible for the following types of heritage resources:

- Buildings and structures of architectural, historical, technical and aesthetic value
- Places to which oral traditions intangible values are attached
- Historical settlements and towns
- Landscapes and natural features
- Geological sites
- Archaeological sites
- Palaeontological sites
- Rock art sites
- Battlefields
- Graves and burial grounds
- Sites associated with slavery

The KwaZulu-Natal Heritage Act provides for responsibility for moveable heritage resources.

== Literature ==
- National Heritage Resources Act, Act 25 of 1999, Government Notice 506, Republic of South Africa Government Gazette, Vol. 406, No 19974, Cape Town, 28 April 1999
- KwaZulu-Natal Heritage Act (Act No. 10 of 1997)
- KwaZulu-Natal Heritage Act (Act No. 4 of 2008)
- Eastern Cape Heritage Resources Act (Act No. 9 of 2003)
- Eastern Cape General Laws Amendment Act (Act No. 2 of 2012) - Repealed Eastern Cape Heritage Resources Act
- Northern Cape Heritage resources Authority Act (Act No.9 of 2013)

== See also ==
- Amafa aKwaZulu-Natali
- Heritage Western Cape
- Northern Cape Heritage Resources Authority
- National Monuments Council (South Africa and Namibia)
- South African Heritage Resources Agency
- Provincial heritage site (South Africa)
- National heritage site (South Africa)
- Heritage objects (South Africa)
- List of heritage sites in South Africa
