= National heritage sites of South Africa =

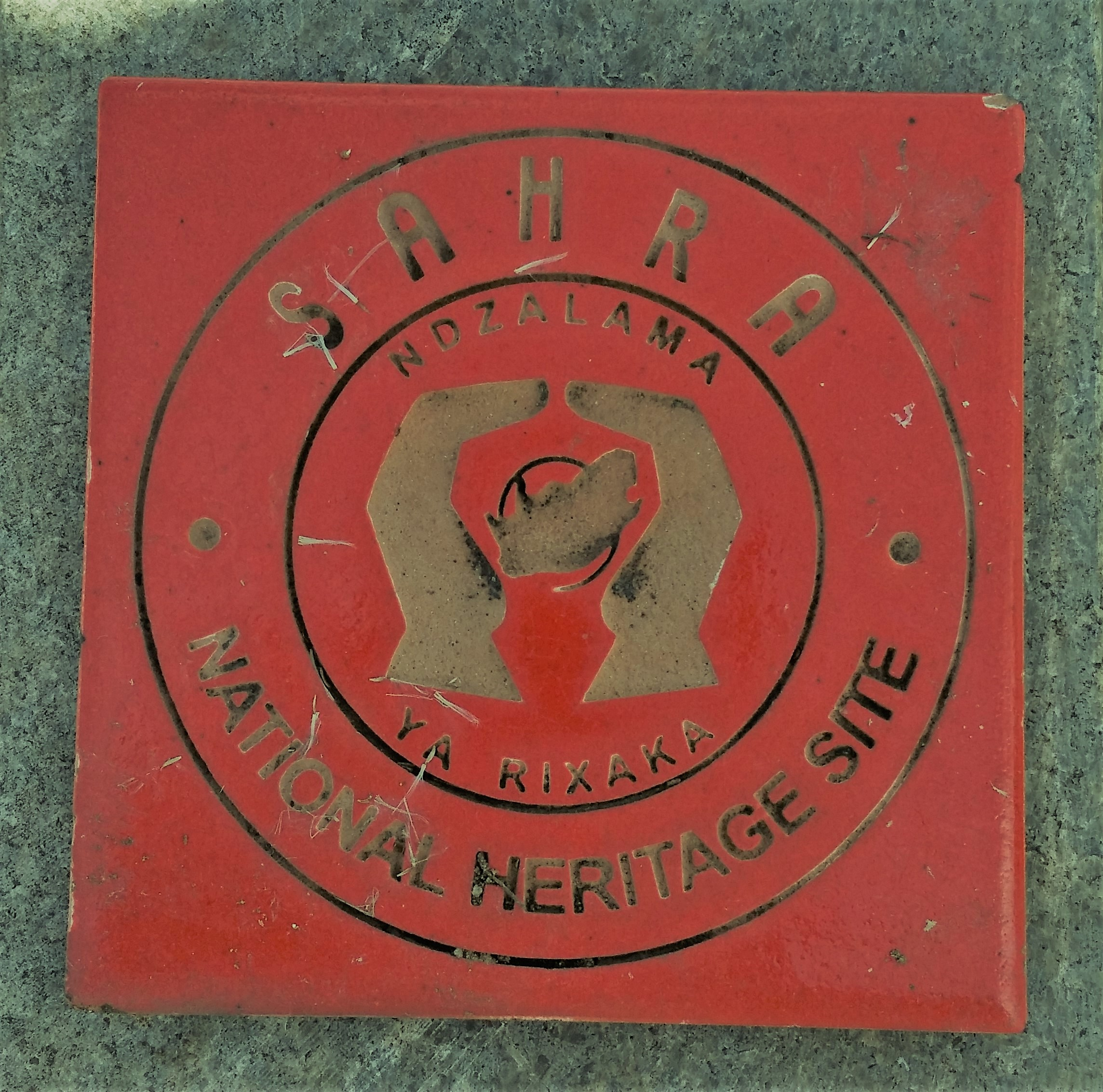
The marker used to show protection as a National Heritage Site.

Section 27 of the National Heritage Resources Act (NHRA) of South Africa provides for places of historic or cultural importance to be designated national heritage sites. This came into effect with the introduction of the Act on 1 April 2000, when all former national monuments declared by the former National Monuments Council and its predecessors became provincial heritage sites as provided for in Section 58 of the Act.

Both national and provincial heritage sites are protected under the terms of Section 27 of the NHRA, and a permit is required to work on them. National heritage sites are declared and administered by the national heritage resources authority, SAHRA; provincial heritage sites fall within the domain of the various provincial heritage resources authorities.

The SAHRA logo is used to mark national heritage sites.

== Current sites ==
Currently proclaimed national heritage sites are:

- Cradle of Humankind
  - Bolt's Farm
  - Coopers Cave
  - Drimolen
  - Gladysvale
  - Plovers Lake
  - Swartkrans Palaeontological Site
- Bo-Kaap
- Boschendal Founders Estate
- Bushmanskloof Rock Painting Landscape
- Castle of Good Hope
- Cape Winelands Cultural Landscape
- Charlotte Maxeke Grave
- Chief Tyali Grave
- Constitution Hill
- Freedom Square, University of Fort Hare
- Freedom Park
- Gondolin, Broederstroom
- Helen Joseph Grave
- Houses of Parliament
- Kaditshwene Cultural landscape
- Klasies River Caves
- Kromdraai fossil site
- Lake Fundudzi
- Lilian Ngoyi Grave
- Liliesleaf Farm
- Madiba House (inside Drakenstein Correctional Centre)
- Makapans Valley and Limeworks at Makapansgat
- Mapungubwe
- Motsetsi
- Non Pareille
- Noordkapperpunt Fish Traps at Stilbaai
- Owl House and Camel Yard
- Rahima Moosa Grave
- Robben Island
- Royal Observatory, Cape of Good Hope
- Sarah Baartman Site
- São José
- Game Pass Shelter, Kamberg Nature Reserve
- Sibhudu Cave
- SAS Pietermaritzburg
- Sharpeville Massacre Grave Sites
- SS Mendi Memorial
- Sterkfontein caves
- Stone Wall, Bo-Kaap
- Taung Palaeonthropological Fossil
- Union Buildings
- Voortrekker Monument
- Waaihoek Wesleyan Mission Church
- Walter Sisulu Square
- West Coast Fossil Park
- Wonderwerk Cave

== See also ==
- South African Heritage Resource Agency
- List of heritage sites in South Africa
- Provincial heritage site (South Africa)
- Heritage objects (South Africa)

Provincial heritage resources authorities

- Amafa aKwaZulu-Natali
- Heritage Western Cape
- Northern Cape Heritage Resources Authority

Previous Heritage conservation authorities

- 1923 to 1969 - Historical Monuments Commission
- 1969 to 2000 - National Monuments Council (South Africa and Namibia)
