= List of heritage sites in the Bo-Kaap of Cape Town =

This is a list of the heritage sites in Cape Town's Bo-Kaap as recognized by the South African Heritage Resources Agency.

For the purposes of this list all sites on the south eastern side of Lion's Head and signal hill, northwest of Buitengracht – New Church Street – Kloof Nek Road and southwest of the Waterfront are listed here, which includes Schottse Kloof and Tamboerskloof.

For additional provincial heritage sites declared by Heritage Western Cape, the provincial heritage resources authority of the Western Cape Province of South Africa, please see the entries at the end of the list. These sites have been declared subsequent to the implementation of the new legislation on 1 April 2000 and unlike those in the SAHRA portion of the list are not former national monuments declared by the former National Monuments Council, the predecessor of both SAHRA and Heritage Western Cape. In the instance of these sites the "identifier" code used is that of Heritage Western Cape rather than SAHRA.

SAHRA identifier	Site name	Description	Town	District	NHRA status	Coordinates	Image
9/2/018/0008	Bo-Kaap – Outside declared area (Suburb), General	Type of site: Suburb. The portions of the Malay Quarter specified in the Schedule are interesting and historical parts of Cape Town, with a special character derived from the customs and ways of life peculiar to the Malays that live there.	Cape Town, Bo-Kaap	The Cape	Heritage Area	33°55′15″S 18°24′52″E	Type of site: Suburb. The portions of the Malay Quarter specified in the Schedule are interesting and historical parts of Cape Town, with a special character derived from the customs and ways of life peculiar to the Malays that live there. Media related to Bo-Kaap at Wikimedia Commons
9/2/018/0012	Mijlof Manor ("Svenska"), 3 Military Road, Tamboerskloof, Cape Town					33°55′37″S 18°24′32″E	Upload Photo
9/2/018/0043	CAPE TOWN MUNICIPAL AREA, GENERAL			Cape Town			Upload Photo
9/2/018/0056/01	The William Fehr Collection, Castle, Rust en Vreugd			Cape Town		33°55′34″S 18°25′41″E	Upload Photo
9/2/018/0059	Stone wall, Buitengracht, Cape Town	Type of site: Wall.	Cape Town, Central	The Cape	Provincial Heritage Site	33°55′28″S 18°24′47″E	Type of site: Wall.
9/2/018/0059-001	VR Post Box, Buitengracht, Cape Town	Type of site: Post Box Current use: Post box.	Cape Town, Central	The Cape	Provincial Heritage Site	33°55′28″S 18°24′47″E	Type of site: Post Box Current use: Post box.
9/2/018/0071	158 Buitengracht, Cape Town		Cape Town, Bo-Kaap	The Cape	Provincial Heritage Site	33°55′22″S 18°24′52″E	Upload Photo
9/2/018/0078	65-69 Buitengracht Street, Cape Town			Cape Town		33°55′13″S 18°25′05″E	Upload Photo
9/2/018/0080	see 9/2/111/0060			Cape Town			Upload Photo
9/2/018/0087	Silverknowles, 20 Brownlow Street, Tamboerskloof, Cape Town		Cape Town, Tamboerskloof	The Cape	Provincial Heritage Site	33°55′38″S 18°24′18″E	Upload Photo
9/2/018/0091	Table Bay Panorama Painting, by J L Pickering (1885), Cape Town			The Cape	Heritage Object	33°55′22″S 18°25′12″E	Upload Photo
9/2/018/0097	Ammunition Magazine, Tamboerskloof, Cape Town	Type of site: Magazine.	Cape Town, Tamboerskloof	The Cape	Provincial Heritage Site	33°55′30″S 18°24′29″E	Upload Photo
9/2/018/0111	St. Andrew's Presbyterian Church, Somerset Road, Cape Town			Cape Town			Upload Photo
9/2/018/0165	see 9/2/018/0067/4			Cape Town			Upload Photo
9/2/018/0184	Good Hope Lodge, Cape Town	De Mist himself described the Lodge as the most beautiful in the world. The strong and bold façade of the building was, and still is, very striking. The interior was indeed impressive. From the entrance hall steps led up to the Temple—a huge hall with a f These buildings were erected in 1804, and are one of the most important examples of the collaboration of Anreith, Thibault and Schutte, the architect, the sculptor and the builder respectively, who exercised a great influence on architecture at the Cape a	Cape Town, Central	The Cape	Provincial Heritage Site	33°55′43″S 18°25′05″E	Upload Photo
9/2/018/0199	Sexton's House, Strand Street, Cape Town	This building at the corner of Strand and Buitengracht Streets was probably built at the same time as the Parsonage, that is between 1779 and 1783. It was originally separated from the Church by another house which the Church Council let out to tenants, b	Cape Town, Central	The Cape	Provincial Heritage Site	33°55′08″S 18°25′10″E	This building at the corner of Strand and Buitengracht Streets was probably built at the same time as the Parsonage, that is between 1779 and 1783. It was originally separated from the Church by another house which the Church Council let out to tenants, b Media related to Sexton's House, Strand Street at Wikimedia Commons
9/2/018/0226	31 Carstens Street, Tamboerskloof, Cape Town	This impressive double-storeyed dwelling, with its Victorian and Jugendstil characteristics, dates from the 1880s and was presumably erected by C. G. Prince.	Cape Town, Tamboerskloof	The Cape	Provincial Heritage Site	33°55′37″S 18°24′22″E	This impressive double-storeyed dwelling, with its Victorian and Jugendstil characteristics, dates from the 1880s and was presumably erected by C. G. Prince.
9/2/018/0227	Devonshire Villa, 33 Carstens Street, Tamboerskloof, Cape Town	This dwelling; which is an excellent example of late Victorian architecture, was erected in 1893 by W. M. Cook, an affluent Cape Town draper and silk merchant. He named the property Devonshire Villa.	Cape Town, Tamboerskloof	The Cape	Provincial Heritage Site	33°55′37″S 18°24′21″E	Upload Photo
9/2/018/0228	Ruimzicht, 10 Milner Road, Tamboerskloof, Cape Town		Cape Town, Tamboerskloof	The Cape	Provincial Heritage Site	33°55′36″S 18°24′27″E	Upload Photo
9/2/018/0243	Conservation areas, Cape Town			Cape Town			Upload Photo
9/2/018/0243/1	Conservation areas, Central Cape Town			Cape Town			Upload Photo
9/2/018/0251	St. Barnabas Church Rectory, 34 Camp Street, Tamboerskloof, Cape Town			Cape Town		33°55′55″S 18°24′25″E	Upload Photo
9/2/018/0253	256 Buitengracht Street, Cape Town			Cape Town		33°55′38″S 18°24′39″E	Upload Photo
9/2/018/0255	14 Kohling Street, Tamboerskloof, Cape Town		Cape Town, Tamboerskloof	The Cape	Provincial Heritage Site	33°55′43″S 18°24′35″E	Upload Photo
9/2/018/0264	Block bounded by Wale, Chiappini, Longmarket & Rose Streets, Bo-Kaap			Cape Town			
9/2/018/0264-010	21 Rose Street, Bo-Kaap, Cape Town	The portions of the Malay Quarter specified in the Schedule are interesting and historical parts of Cape Town, with a special character derived from the customs and ways of life peculiar to the Malays that live there.	Cape Town, Bo-Kaap	The Cape	Provincial Heritage Site	33°55′09″S 18°25′03″E	The portions of the Malay Quarter specified in the Schedule are interesting and historical parts of Cape Town, with a special character derived from the customs and ways of life peculiar to the Malays that live there.
9/2/018/0264-011	120 Church Street, Bo-Kaap, Cape Town	Type of site: House. The portions of the Malay Quarter specified in the Schedule are interesting and historical parts of Cape Town, with a special character derived from the customs and ways of life peculiar to the Malays that live there.	Cape Town, Bo-Kaap	The Cape	Provincial Heritage Site	33°55′14″S 18°24′56″E	Upload Photo
9/2/018/0264-012	122 Church Street, Bo-Kaap, Cape Town	Type of site: House. The portions of the Malay Quarter specified in the Schedule are interesting and historical parts of Cape Town, with a special character derived from the customs and ways of life peculiar to the Malays that live there.	Cape Town, Bo-Kaap	The Cape	Provincial Heritage Site	33°55′20″S 18°25′00″E	Upload Photo
9/2/018/0264-013	124 Church Street, Bo-Kaap, Cape Town	Type of site: House. The portions of the Malay Quarter specified in the Schedule are interesting and historical parts of Cape Town, with a special character derived from the customs and ways of life peculiar to the Malays that live there.	Cape Town, Bo-Kaap	The Cape	Provincial Heritage Site	33°55′14″S 18°24′56″E	Upload Photo
9/2/018/0264-014	128 Church Street, Bo-Kaap, Cape Town	Type of site: House. The portions of the Malay Quarter specified in the Schedule are interesting and historical parts of Cape Town, with a special character derived from the customs and ways of life peculiar to the Malays that live there.	Cape Town, Bo-Kaap	The Cape	Provincial Heritage Site	33°55′13″S 18°24′55″E	Upload Photo
9/2/018/0264-015	109 Church Street, Bo-Kaap, Cape Town	The portions of the Malay Quarter specified in the Schedule are interesting and historical parts of Cape Town, with a special character derived from the customs and ways of life peculiar to the Malays that live there.	Cape Town, Bo-Kaap	The Cape	Provincial Heritage Site	33°55′14″S 18°24′55″E	The portions of the Malay Quarter specified in the Schedule are interesting and historical parts of Cape Town, with a special character derived from the customs and ways of life peculiar to the Malays that live there.
9/2/018/0264-016	111 Church Street, Bo-Kaap, Cape Town	The portions of the Malay Quarter specified in the Schedule are interesting and historical parts of Cape Town, with a special character derived from the customs and ways of life peculiar to the Malays that live there.	Cape Town, Bo-Kaap	The Cape	Provincial Heritage Site	33°55′14″S 18°24′55″E	Upload Photo
9/2/018/0264-017	117 Church Street, Bo-Kaap, Cape Town	Type of site: House. The portions of the Malay Quarter specified in the Schedule are interesting and historical parts of Cape Town, with a special character derived from the customs and ways of life peculiar to the Malays that live there.	Cape Town, Bo-Kaap	The Cape	Provincial Heritage Site	33°55′14″S 18°24′55″E	Type of site: House. The portions of the Malay Quarter specified in the Schedule are interesting and historical parts of Cape Town, with a special character derived from the customs and ways of life peculiar to the Malays that live there.
9/2/018/0264-018	1 Lion Lane, Bo-Kaap, Cape Town		Cape Town, Bo-Kaap	The Cape	Provincial Heritage Site	33°55′19″S 18°24′52″E	Upload Photo
9/2/018/0264-019	205 Longmarket Street, Bo-Kaap, Cape Town	The portions of the Malay Quarter specified in the Schedule are interesting and historical parts of Cape Town, with a special character derived from the customs and ways of life peculiar to the Malays that live there.	Cape Town, Bo-Kaap	The Cape	Provincial Heritage Site	33°55′12″S 18°24′57″E	The portions of the Malay Quarter specified in the Schedule are interesting and historical parts of Cape Town, with a special character derived from the customs and ways of life peculiar to the Malays that live there.
9/2/018/0264-020	44 Rose Street, Bo-Kaap, Cape Town	The portions of the Malay Quarter specified in the Schedule are interesting and historical parts of Cape Town, with a special character derived from the customs and ways of life peculiar to the Malays that live there.	Cape Town, Bo-Kaap	The Cape	Provincial Heritage Site	33°55′11″S 18°24′59″E	The portions of the Malay Quarter specified in the Schedule are interesting and historical parts of Cape Town, with a special character derived from the customs and ways of life peculiar to the Malays that live there.
9/2/018/0264-021	102 Wale Street, Bo-Kaap, Cape Town	The portions of the Malay Quarter specified in the Schedule are interesting and historical parts of Cape Town, with a special character derived from the customs and ways of life peculiar to the Malays that live there.	Cape Town, Bo-Kaap	The Cape	Provincial Heritage Site	33°55′14″S 18°24′51″E	Upload Photo
9/2/018/0264-022	104 Wale Street, Bo-Kaap, Cape Town	The portions of the Malay Quarter specified in the Schedule are interesting and historical parts of Cape Town, with a special character derived from the customs and ways of life peculiar to the Malays that live there.	Cape Town, Bo-Kaap	The Cape	Provincial Heritage Site	33°55′15″S 18°24′54″E	Upload Photo
9/2/018/0264-023	106 Wale Street, Bo-Kaap, Cape Town	The portions of the Malay Quarter specified in the Schedule are interesting and historical parts of Cape Town, with a special character derived from the customs and ways of life peculiar to the Malays that live there.	Cape Town, Bo-Kaap	The Cape	Provincial Heritage Site	33°55′15″S 18°24′54″E	Upload Photo
9/2/018/0264-024	108 Wale Street, Bo-Kaap, Cape Town	The portions of the Malay Quarter specified in the Schedule are interesting and historical parts of Cape Town, with a special character derived from the customs and ways of life peculiar to the Malays that live there.	Cape Town, Bo-Kaap	The Cape	Provincial Heritage Site	33°55′15″S 18°24′53″E	Upload Photo
9/2/018/0264-025	Old coach house and stables, Rose Street, Bo-Kaap, Cape Town	Type of site: Stables, Coach House. The portions of the Malay Quarter specified in the Schedule are interesting and historical parts of Cape Town, with a special character derived from the customs and ways of life peculiar to the Malays that live there.	Cape Town, Bo-Kaap	The Cape	Provincial Heritage Site	33°55′06″S 18°24′52″E	Upload Photo
9/2/018/0264-026	17 Helliger Lane, Bo-Kaap, Cape Town	The portions of the Malay Quarter specified in the Schedule are interesting and historical parts of Cape Town, with a special character derived from the customs and ways of life peculiar to the Malays that live there.	Cape Town, Bo-Kaap	The Cape	Provincial Heritage Site	33°55′15″S 18°24′54″E	The portions of the Malay Quarter specified in the Schedule are interesting and historical parts of Cape Town, with a special character derived from the customs and ways of life peculiar to the Malays that live there.
9/2/018/0264-027	95 Chiappini Street, Bo-Kaap, Cape Town	The portions of the Malay Quarter specified in the Schedule are interesting and historical parts of Cape Town, with a special character derived from the customs and ways of life peculiar to the Malays that live there.	Cape Town, Bo-Kaap	The Cape	Provincial Heritage Site	33°55′15″S 18°24′53″E	Upload Photo
9/2/018/0264-028	97 Chiappini Street, Bo-Kaap, Cape Town	The portions of the Malay Quarter specified in the Schedule are interesting and historical parts of Cape Town, with a special character derived from the customs and ways of life peculiar to the Malays that live there.	Cape Town, Bo-Kaap	The Cape	Provincial Heritage Site	33°55′15″S 18°24′52″E	Upload Photo
9/2/018/0264-029	199 Longmarket Street, Bo-Kaap, Cape Town	The portions of the Malay Quarter specified in the Schedule are interesting and historical parts of Cape Town, with a special character derived from the customs and ways of life peculiar to the Malays that live there.	Cape Town, Bo-Kaap	The Cape	Provincial Heritage Site	33°55′13″S 18°24′57″E	The portions of the Malay Quarter specified in the Schedule are interesting and historical parts of Cape Town, with a special character derived from the customs and ways of life peculiar to the Malays that live there.
9/2/018/0264-030	201 Longmarket Street, Bo-Kaap, Cape Town	The portions of the Malay Quarter specified in the Schedule are interesting and historical parts of Cape Town, with a special character derived from the customs and ways of life peculiar to the Malays that live there.	Cape Town, Bo-Kaap	The Cape	Provincial Heritage Site	33°55′12″S 18°24′57″E	The portions of the Malay Quarter specified in the Schedule are interesting and historical parts of Cape Town, with a special character derived from the customs and ways of life peculiar to the Malays that live there.
9/2/018/0264-031	202 Longmarket Street, Bo-Kaap, Cape Town	The portions of the Malay Quarter specified in the Schedule are interesting and historical parts of Cape Town, with a special character derived from the customs and ways of life peculiar to the Malays that live there.	Cape Town, Bo-Kaap	The Cape	Provincial Heritage Site	33°55′12″S 18°24′57″E	The portions of the Malay Quarter specified in the Schedule are interesting and historical parts of Cape Town, with a special character derived from the customs and ways of life peculiar to the Malays that live there.
9/2/018/0264-032	203 Longmarket Street, Bo-Kaap, Cape Town	The portions of the Malay Quarter specified in the Schedule are interesting and historical parts of Cape Town, with a special character derived from the customs and ways of life peculiar to the Malays that live there.	Cape Town, Bo-Kaap	The Cape	Provincial Heritage Site	33°55′12″S 18°24′57″E	The portions of the Malay Quarter specified in the Schedule are interesting and historical parts of Cape Town, with a special character derived from the customs and ways of life peculiar to the Malays that live there.
9/2/018/0264-033	211 Longmarket Street, Bo-Kaap, Cape Town	The portions of the Malay Quarter specified in the Schedule are interesting and historical parts of Cape Town, with a special character derived from the customs and ways of life peculiar to the Malays that live there.	Cape Town, Bo-Kaap	The Cape	Provincial Heritage Site	33°55′12″S 18°24′56″E	The portions of the Malay Quarter specified in the Schedule are interesting and historical parts of Cape Town, with a special character derived from the customs and ways of life peculiar to the Malays that live there.
9/2/018/0264-034	197 Longmarket Street, Bo-Kaap, Cape Town	The portions of the Malay Quarter specified in the Schedule are interesting and historical parts of Cape Town, with a special character derived from the customs and ways of life peculiar to the Malays that live there.	Cape Town, Bo-Kaap	The Cape	Provincial Heritage Site	33°55′13″S 18°24′58″E	Upload Photo
9/2/018/0264-035	16 Helliger Lane, Bo-Kaap, Cape Town	The portions of the Malay Quarter specified in the Schedule are interesting and historical parts of Cape Town, with a special character derived from the customs and ways of life peculiar to the Malays that live there.	Cape Town, Bo-Kaap	The Cape	Provincial Heritage Site	33°55′15″S 18°24′55″E	Upload Photo
9/2/018/0264-036	Erf 1372, Bo-Kaap, Cape Town	The portions of the Malay Quarter specified in the Schedule are interesting and historical parts of Cape Town, with a special character derived from the customs and ways of life peculiar to the Malays that live there.	Cape Town, Bo-Kaap	The Cape	Provincial Heritage Site	33°55′18″S 18°24′54″E	Upload Photo
9/2/018/0264-037	Erf 2769, Bo-Kaap, Cape Town	The portions of the Malay Quarter specified in the Schedule are interesting and historical parts of Cape Town, with a special character derived from the customs and ways of life peculiar to the Malays that live there.	Cape Town, Bo-Kaap	The Cape	Provincial Heritage Site	33°55′18″S 18°24′55″E	Upload Photo
9/2/018/0264-038	20 Helliger Lane, Bo-Kaap, Cape Town	The portions of the Malay Quarter specified in the Schedule are interesting and historical parts of Cape Town, with a special character derived from the customs and ways of life peculiar to the Malays that live there.	Cape Town, Bo-Kaap	The Cape	Provincial Heritage Site	33°55′14″S 18°24′54″E	Upload Photo
9/2/018/0264-040	Mosque Boorhaanol Islam, Longmarket Street, Bo-Kaap, Cape Town	Type of site: Mosque. The portions of the Malay Quarter specified in the Schedule are interesting and historical parts of Cape Town, with a special character derived from the customs and ways of life peculiar to the Malays that live there.	Cape Town, Bo-Kaap	The Cape	Provincial Heritage Site	33°55′12″S 18°24′57″E	Type of site: Mosque. The portions of the Malay Quarter specified in the Schedule are interesting and historical parts of Cape Town, with a special character derived from the customs and ways of life peculiar to the Malays that live there.
9/2/018/0264-041	188 Longmarket Street, Bo-Kaap, Cape Town	The portions of the Malay Quarter specified in the Schedule are interesting and historical parts of Cape Town, with a special character derived from the customs and ways of life peculiar to the Malays that live there.	Cape Town, Bo-Kaap	The Cape	Provincial Heritage Site	33°55′12″S 18°24′58″E	Upload Photo
9/2/018/0264-042	192 Longmarket Street, Bo-Kaap, Cape Town	The portions of the Malay Quarter specified in the Schedule are interesting and historical parts of Cape Town, with a special character derived from the customs and ways of life peculiar to the Malays that live there.	Cape Town, Bo-Kaap	The Cape	Provincial Heritage Site	33°55′12″S 18°24′57″E	Upload Photo
9/2/018/0264-043	194 Longmarket Street, Bo-Kaap, Cape Town	Current use: Dwelling. The portions of the Malay Quarter specified in the Schedule are interesting and historical parts of Cape Town, with a special character derived from the customs and ways of life peculiar to the Malays that live there.	Cape Town, Bo-Kaap	The Cape	Provincial Heritage Site	33°55′12″S 18°24′57″E	Upload Photo
9/2/018/0264-044	196 Longmarket Street, Bo-Kaap, Cape Town	Current use: Dwelling. The portions of the Malay Quarter specified in the Schedule are interesting and historical parts of Cape Town, with a special character derived from the customs and ways of life peculiar to the Malays that live there.	Cape Town, Bo-Kaap	The Cape	Provincial Heritage Site	33°55′11″S 18°24′57″E	Upload Photo
9/2/018/0264-045	Helliger Lane, Bo-Kaap, Cape Town	The portions of the Malay Quarter specified in the Schedule are interesting and historical parts of Cape Town, with a special character derived from the customs and ways of life peculiar to the Malays that live there.	Cape Town, Bo-Kaap	The Cape	Provincial Heritage Site	33°55′15″S 18°24′55″E	Upload Photo
9/2/018/0264-046	89 Chiappini Street, Bo-Kaap, Cape Town	The portions of the Malay Quarter specified in the Schedule are interesting and historical parts of Cape Town, with a special character derived from the customs and ways of life peculiar to the Malays that live there.	Cape Town, Bo-Kaap	The Cape	Provincial Heritage Site	33°55′14″S 18°24′54″E	Upload Photo
9/2/018/0264-047	130 Church Street, Bo-Kaap, Cape Town	Type of site: House. The portions of the Malay Quarter specified in the Schedule are interesting and historical parts of Cape Town, with a special character derived from the customs and ways of life peculiar to the Malays that live there.	Cape Town, Bo-Kaap	The Cape	Provincial Heritage Site	33°55′13″S 18°24′55″E	Upload Photo
9/2/018/0264-048	Erf 1039, Bo-Kaap, Cape Town	The portions of the Malay Quarter specified in the Schedule are interesting and historical parts of Cape Town, with a special character derived from the customs and ways of life peculiar to the Malays that live there.	Cape Town, Bo-Kaap	The Cape	Provincial Heritage Site	33°55′15″S 18°24′51″E	Upload Photo
9/2/018/0264-049	Erf 1353, Bo-Kaap, Cape Town	The portions of the Malay Quarter specified in the Schedule are interesting and historical parts of Cape Town, with a special character derived from the customs and ways of life peculiar to the Malays that live there.	Cape Town, Bo-Kaap	The Cape	Provincial Heritage Site	33°55′15″S 18°24′52″E	Upload Photo
9/2/018/0264-050	Erf 2773, Bo-Kaap, Cape Town	The portions of the Malay Quarter specified in the Schedule are interesting and historical parts of Cape Town, with a special character derived from the customs and ways of life peculiar to the Malays that live there.	Cape Town, Bo-Kaap	The Cape	Provincial Heritage Site	33°55′17″S 18°24′54″E	Upload Photo
9/2/018/0264-051	Erf 1362, Bo-Kaap, Cape Town	The portions of the Malay Quarter specified in the Schedule are interesting and historical parts of Cape Town, with a special character derived from the customs and ways of life peculiar to the Malays that live there.	Cape Town, Bo-Kaap	The Cape	Provincial Heritage Site	33°55′18″S 18°24′56″E	Upload Photo
9/2/018/0264-052	71 Chiappini Street, Bo-Kaap, Cape Town	The portions of the Malay Quarter specified in the Schedule are interesting and historical parts of Cape Town, with a special character derived from the customs and ways of life peculiar to the Malays that live there.	Cape Town, Bo-Kaap	The Cape	Provincial Heritage Site	33°55′12″S 18°24′56″E	The portions of the Malay Quarter specified in the Schedule are interesting and historical parts of Cape Town, with a special character derived from the customs and ways of life peculiar to the Malays that live there.
9/2/018/0264-053	73 Chiappini Street, Bo-Kaap, Cape Town	The portions of the Malay Quarter specified in the Schedule are interesting and historical parts of Cape Town, with a special character derived from the customs and ways of life peculiar to the Malays that live there.	Cape Town, Bo-Kaap	The Cape	Provincial Heritage Site	33°55′12″S 18°24′56″E	The portions of the Malay Quarter specified in the Schedule are interesting and historical parts of Cape Town, with a special character derived from the customs and ways of life peculiar to the Malays that live there.
9/2/018/0264-054	75 Chiappini Street, Bo-Kaap, Cape Town	The portions of the Malay Quarter specified in the Schedule are interesting and historical parts of Cape Town, with a special character derived from the customs and ways of life peculiar to the Malays that live there.	Cape Town, Bo-Kaap	The Cape	Provincial Heritage Site	33°55′12″S 18°24′55″E	The portions of the Malay Quarter specified in the Schedule are interesting and historical parts of Cape Town, with a special character derived from the customs and ways of life peculiar to the Malays that live there.
9/2/018/0264-055	69 Chiappini Street, Bo-Kaap, Cape Town	The portions of the Malay Quarter specified in the Schedule are interesting and historical parts of Cape Town, with a special character derived from the customs and ways of life peculiar to the Malays that live there.	Cape Town, Bo-Kaap	The Cape	Provincial Heritage Site	33°55′12″S 18°24′56″E	The portions of the Malay Quarter specified in the Schedule are interesting and historical parts of Cape Town, with a special character derived from the customs and ways of life peculiar to the Malays that live there.
9/2/018/0264-056	83 Chiappini Street, Bo-Kaap, Cape Town	The portions of the Malay Quarter specified in the Schedule are interesting and historical parts of Cape Town, with a special character derived from the customs and ways of life peculiar to the Malays that live there.	Cape Town, Bo-Kaap	The Cape	Provincial Heritage Site	33°55′13″S 18°24′54″E	The portions of the Malay Quarter specified in the Schedule are interesting and historical parts of Cape Town, with a special character derived from the customs and ways of life peculiar to the Malays that live there.
9/2/018/0264-057	65A Chiappini Street, Bo-Kaap, Cape Town	The portions of the Malay Quarter specified in the Schedule are interesting and historical parts of Cape Town, with a special character derived from the customs and ways of life peculiar to the Malays that live there.	Cape Town, Bo-Kaap	The Cape	Provincial Heritage Site	33°55′11″S 18°24′57″E	The portions of the Malay Quarter specified in the Schedule are interesting and historical parts of Cape Town, with a special character derived from the customs and ways of life peculiar to the Malays that live there.
9/2/018/0264-058	91 Chiappini Street, Bo-Kaap, Cape Town	The portions of the Malay Quarter specified in the Schedule are interesting and historical parts of Cape Town, with a special character derived from the customs and ways of life peculiar to the Malays that live there.	Cape Town, Bo-Kaap	The Cape	Provincial Heritage Site	33°55′14″S 18°24′53″E	The portions of the Malay Quarter specified in the Schedule are interesting and historical parts of Cape Town, with a special character derived from the customs and ways of life peculiar to the Malays that live there.
9/2/018/0264-059-01	Erf 1944, 93 Chiappini Street, Bo-Kaap, Cape Town	The portions of the Malay Quarter specified in the Schedule are interesting and historical parts of Cape Town, with a special character derived from the customs and ways of life peculiar to the Malays that live there.	Cape Town, Bo-Kaap	The Cape	Provincial Heritage Site	33°55′14″S 18°24′53″E	Upload Photo
9/2/018/0264-059-02	Erf 1943, 93 Chiappini Street, Bo-Kaap, Cape Town	The portions of the Malay Quarter specified in the Schedule are interesting and historical parts of Cape Town, with a special character derived from the customs and ways of life peculiar to the Malays that live there.	Cape Town, Bo-Kaap	The Cape	Provincial Heritage Site	33°55′14″S 18°24′53″E	Upload Photo
9/2/018/0264-061	Erf 1354, Bo-Kaap, Cape Town	The portions of the Malay Quarter specified in the Schedule are interesting and historical parts of Cape Town, with a special character derived from the customs and ways of life peculiar to the Malays that live there.	Cape Town, Bo-Kaap	The Cape	Provincial Heritage Site	33°55′16″S 18°24′53″E	Upload Photo
9/2/018/0264-062	Erf 1352, Bo-Kaap, Cape Town	The portions of the Malay Quarter specified in the Schedule are interesting and historical parts of Cape Town, with a special character derived from the customs and ways of life peculiar to the Malays that live there.	Cape Town, Bo-Kaap	The Cape	Provincial Heritage Site	33°55′17″S 18°24′54″E	Upload Photo
9/2/018/0264-063	Erf 1363, Bo-Kaap, Cape Town	The portions of the Malay Quarter specified in the Schedule are interesting and historical parts of Cape Town, with a special character derived from the customs and ways of life peculiar to the Malays that live there.	Cape Town, Bo-Kaap	The Cape	Provincial Heritage Site	33°55′20″S 18°24′57″E	Upload Photo
9/2/018/0264-064	Erf 1962, Bo-Kaap, Cape Town	The portions of the Malay Quarter specified in the Schedule are interesting and historical parts of Cape Town, with a special character derived from the customs and ways of life peculiar to the Malays that live there.	Cape Town, Bo-Kaap	The Cape	Provincial Heritage Site	33°55′18″S 18°24′52″E	Upload Photo
9/2/018/0264-065	22 Helliger Lane, Bo-Kaap, Cape Town	The portions of the Malay Quarter specified in the Schedule are interesting and historical parts of Cape Town, with a special character derived from the customs and ways of life peculiar to the Malays that live there.	Cape Town, Bo-Kaap	The Cape	Provincial Heritage Site	33°55′14″S 18°24′54″E	Upload Photo
9/2/018/0264-066	77 Chiappini Street, Bo-Kaap, Cape Town	The portions of the Malay Quarter specified in the Schedule are interesting and historical parts of Cape Town, with a special character derived from the customs and ways of life peculiar to the Malays that live there.	Cape Town, Bo-Kaap	The Cape	Provincial Heritage Site	33°55′13″S 18°24′55″E	The portions of the Malay Quarter specified in the Schedule are interesting and historical parts of Cape Town, with a special character derived from the customs and ways of life peculiar to the Malays that live there.
9/2/018/0264-067	Erf 1952, 76 Rose Street, Bo-Kaap, Cape Town	The portions of the Malay Quarter specified in the Schedule are interesting and historical parts of Cape Town, with a special character derived from the customs and ways of life peculiar to the Malays that live there.	Cape Town, Bo-Kaap	The Cape	Provincial Heritage Site	33°55′16″S 18°24′54″E	Upload Photo
9/2/018/0264-068	83 Wale Street, Bo-Kaap, Cape Town	The portions of the Malay Quarter specified in the Schedule are interesting and historical parts of Cape Town, with a special character derived from the customs and ways of life peculiar to the Malays that live there.	Cape Town, Bo-Kaap	The Cape	Provincial Heritage Site	33°55′16″S 18°24′52″E	The portions of the Malay Quarter specified in the Schedule are interesting and historical parts of Cape Town, with a special character derived from the customs and ways of life peculiar to the Malays that live there.
9/2/018/0264-069	50 Rose Street, Bo-Kaap, Cape Town	The portions of the Malay Quarter specified in the Schedule are interesting and historical parts of Cape Town, with a special character derived from the customs and ways of life peculiar to the Malays that live there.	Cape Town, Bo-Kaap	The Cape	Provincial Heritage Site	33°55′12″S 18°24′58″E	The portions of the Malay Quarter specified in the Schedule are interesting and historical parts of Cape Town, with a special character derived from the customs and ways of life peculiar to the Malays that live there.
9/2/018/0264-070	56 Rose Street, Bo-Kaap, Cape Town	The portions of the Malay Quarter specified in the Schedule are interesting and historical parts of Cape Town, with a special character derived from the customs and ways of life peculiar to the Malays that live there.	Cape Town, Bo-Kaap	The Cape	Provincial Heritage Site	33°55′13″S 18°24′57″E	The portions of the Malay Quarter specified in the Schedule are interesting and historical parts of Cape Town, with a special character derived from the customs and ways of life peculiar to the Malays that live there.
9/2/018/0264-071	68 Rose Street, Bo-Kaap, Cape Town	The portions of the Malay Quarter specified in the Schedule are interesting and historical parts of Cape Town, with a special character derived from the customs and ways of life peculiar to the Malays that live there.	Cape Town, Bo-Kaap	The Cape	Provincial Heritage Site	33°55′14″S 18°24′56″E	Upload Photo
9/2/018/0264-072	198 Longmarket Street, Bo-Kaap, Cape Town	The portions of the Malay Quarter specified in the Schedule are interesting and historical parts of Cape Town, with a special character derived from the customs and ways of life peculiar to the Malays that live there.	Cape Town, Bo-Kaap	The Cape	Provincial Heritage Site	33°55′11″S 18°24′57″E	Upload Photo
9/2/018/0264-073	72 Rose Street, Bo-Kaap, Cape Town	The portions of the Malay Quarter specified in the Schedule are interesting and historical parts of Cape Town, with a special character derived from the customs and ways of life peculiar to the Malays that live there.	Cape Town, Bo-Kaap	The Cape	Provincial Heritage Site	33°55′15″S 18°24′55″E	The portions of the Malay Quarter specified in the Schedule are interesting and historical parts of Cape Town, with a special character derived from the customs and ways of life peculiar to the Malays that live there.
9/2/018/0264-074	19 Helliger Lane, Bo-Kaap, Cape Town	The portions of the Malay Quarter specified in the Schedule are interesting and historical parts of Cape Town, with a special character derived from the customs and ways of life peculiar to the Malays that live there.	Cape Town, Bo-Kaap	The Cape	Provincial Heritage Site	33°55′15″S 18°24′54″E	The portions of the Malay Quarter specified in the Schedule are interesting and historical parts of Cape Town, with a special character derived from the customs and ways of life peculiar to the Malays that live there.
9/2/018/0264-075	79 Wale Street, Bo-Kaap, Cape Town	The portions of the Malay Quarter specified in the Schedule are interesting and historical parts of Cape Town, with a special character derived from the customs and ways of life peculiar to the Malays that live there.	Cape Town, Bo-Kaap	The Cape	Provincial Heritage Site	33°55′17″S 18°24′53″E	Upload Photo
9/2/018/0264-076	74A Rose Street, Bo-Kaap, Cape Town	The portions of the Malay Quarter specified in the Schedule are interesting and historical parts of Cape Town, with a special character derived from the customs and ways of life peculiar to the Malays that live there.	Cape Town, Bo-Kaap	The Cape	Provincial Heritage Site	33°55′15″S 18°24′56″E	The portions of the Malay Quarter specified in the Schedule are interesting and historical parts of Cape Town, with a special character derived from the customs and ways of life peculiar to the Malays that live there.
9/2/018/0264-077	70 Rose Street, Bo-Kaap, Cape Town	The portions of the Malay Quarter specified in the Schedule are interesting and historical parts of Cape Town, with a special character derived from the customs and ways of life peculiar to the Malays that live there.	Cape Town, Bo-Kaap	The Cape	Provincial Heritage Site	33°55′15″S 18°24′56″E	Upload Photo
9/2/018/0264-078	Erf 1953, 76 Rose Street, Bo-Kaap, Cape Town	The portions of the Malay Quarter specified in the Schedule are interesting and historical parts of Cape Town, with a special character derived from the customs and ways of life peculiar to the Malays that live there.	Cape Town, Bo-Kaap	The Cape	Provincial Heritage Site	33°57′40″S 18°24′54″E	Upload Photo
9/2/018/0264-079	78 Rose Street, Bo-Kaap, Cape Town	The portions of the Malay Quarter specified in the Schedule are interesting and historical parts of Cape Town, with a special character derived from the customs and ways of life peculiar to the Malays that live there.	Cape Town, Bo-Kaap	The Cape	Provincial Heritage Site	33°55′16″S 18°24′55″E	Upload Photo
9/2/018/0264-080	89 Shortmarket Street, Bo-Kaap, Cape Town	The portions of the Malay Quarter specified in the Schedule are interesting and historical parts of Cape Town, with a special character derived from the customs and ways of life peculiar to the Malays that live there.	Cape Town, Bo-Kaap	The Cape	Provincial Heritage Site	33°55′11″S 18°24′59″E	Upload Photo
9/2/018/0264-081	91 Shortmarket Street, Bo-Kaap, Cape Town	The portions of the Malay Quarter specified in the Schedule are interesting and historical parts of Cape Town, with a special character derived from the customs and ways of life peculiar to the Malays that live there.	Cape Town, Bo-Kaap	The Cape	Provincial Heritage Site	33°55′11″S 18°24′59″E	Upload Photo
9/2/018/0264-082	95 Shortmarket Street, Bo-Kaap, Cape Town	The portions of the Malay Quarter specified in the Schedule are interesting and historical parts of Cape Town, with a special character derived from the customs and ways of life peculiar to the Malays that live there.	Cape Town, Bo-Kaap	The Cape	Provincial Heritage Site	33°55′11″S 18°24′58″E	Upload Photo
9/2/018/0264-083	97 Shortmarket Street, Bo-Kaap, Cape Town	The portions of the Malay Quarter specified in the Schedule are interesting and historical parts of Cape Town, with a special character derived from the customs and ways of life peculiar to the Malays that live there.	Cape Town, Bo-Kaap	The Cape	Provincial Heritage Site	33°55′16″S 18°25′06″E	Upload Photo
9/2/018/0264-084	99 Shortmarket Street, Bo-Kaap, Cape Town	The portions of the Malay Quarter specified in the Schedule are interesting and historical parts of Cape Town, with a special character derived from the customs and ways of life peculiar to the Malays that live there.	Cape Town, Bo-Kaap	The Cape	Provincial Heritage Site	33°55′10″S 18°24′58″E	Upload Photo
9/2/018/0264-085	2 Lion Lane, Bo-Kaap, Cape Town		Cape Town, Bo-Kaap	The Cape	Provincial Heritage Site	33°55′19″S 18°24′51″E	Upload Photo
9/2/018/0264-086	74 Rose Street, Bo-Kaap, Cape Town	The portions of the Malay Quarter specified in the Schedule are interesting and historical parts of Cape Town, with a special character derived from the customs and ways of life peculiar to the Malays that live there.	Cape Town, Bo-Kaap	The Cape	Provincial Heritage Site	33°55′15″S 18°24′56″E	The portions of the Malay Quarter specified in the Schedule are interesting and historical parts of Cape Town, with a special character derived from the customs and ways of life peculiar to the Malays that live there.
9/2/018/0264-087	67 Wale Street, Bo-Kaap, Cape Town	The portions of the Malay Quarter specified in the Schedule are interesting and historical parts of Cape Town, with a special character derived from the customs and ways of life peculiar to the Malays that live there.	Cape Town, Bo-Kaap	The Cape	Provincial Heritage Site	33°55′18″S 18°24′55″E	The portions of the Malay Quarter specified in the Schedule are interesting and historical parts of Cape Town, with a special character derived from the customs and ways of life peculiar to the Malays that live there.
9/2/018/0264-088	Wale Street, Bo-Kaap, Cape Town	The portions of the Malay Quarter specified in the Schedule are interesting and historical parts of Cape Town, with a special character derived from the customs and ways of life peculiar to the Malays that live there.	Cape Town, Bo-Kaap	The Cape	Provincial Heritage Site	33°55′15″S 18°24′52″E	The portions of the Malay Quarter specified in the Schedule are interesting and historical parts of Cape Town, with a special character derived from the customs and ways of life peculiar to the Malays that live there.
9/2/018/0264-089	77 Wale Street, Bo-Kaap, Cape Town	The portions of the Malay Quarter specified in the Schedule are interesting and historical parts of Cape Town, with a special character derived from the customs and ways of life peculiar to the Malays that live there.	Cape Town, Bo-Kaap	The Cape	Provincial Heritage Site	33°55′17″S 18°24′53″E	The portions of the Malay Quarter specified in the Schedule are interesting and historical parts of Cape Town, with a special character derived from the customs and ways of life peculiar to the Malays that live there.
9/2/018/0264-090	75 Wale Street, Bo-Kaap, Cape Town	The portions of the Malay Quarter specified in the Schedule are interesting and historical parts of Cape Town, with a special character derived from the customs and ways of life peculiar to the Malays that live there.	Cape Town, Bo-Kaap	The Cape	Provincial Heritage Site	33°55′17″S 18°24′53″E	The portions of the Malay Quarter specified in the Schedule are interesting and historical parts of Cape Town, with a special character derived from the customs and ways of life peculiar to the Malays that live there.
9/2/018/0264-091	69 Wale Street, Bo-Kaap, Cape Town	The portions of the Malay Quarter specified in the Schedule are interesting and historical parts of Cape Town, with a special character derived from the customs and ways of life peculiar to the Malays that live there.	Cape Town, Bo-Kaap	The Cape	Provincial Heritage Site	33°55′18″S 18°24′54″E	The portions of the Malay Quarter specified in the Schedule are interesting and historical parts of Cape Town, with a special character derived from the customs and ways of life peculiar to the Malays that live there.
9/2/018/0264-092	Sports Club, Rose Street, Bo-Kaap, Cape Town	Type of site: Club. The portions of the Malay Quarter specified in the Schedule are interesting and historical parts of Cape Town, with a special character derived from the customs and ways of life peculiar to the Malays that live there.	Cape Town, Bo-Kaap	The Cape	Provincial Heritage Site	33°55′08″S 18°25′03″E	Type of site: Club. The portions of the Malay Quarter specified in the Schedule are interesting and historical parts of Cape Town, with a special character derived from the customs and ways of life peculiar to the Malays that live there.
9/2/018/0264-093	113 Church Street, Bo-Kaap, Cape Town	Type of site: House. The portions of the Malay Quarter specified in the Schedule are interesting and historical parts of Cape Town, with a special character derived from the customs and ways of life peculiar to the Malays that live there.	Cape Town, Bo-Kaap	The Cape	Provincial Heritage Site	33°55′14″S 18°24′55″E	Type of site: House. The portions of the Malay Quarter specified in the Schedule are interesting and historical parts of Cape Town, with a special character derived from the customs and ways of life peculiar to the Malays that live there.
9/2/018/0264-094	Erf 2788 Bo-Kaap, Cape Town	The portions of the Malay Quarter specified in the Schedule are interesting and historical parts of Cape Town, with a special character derived from the customs and ways of life peculiar to the Malays that live there.	Cape Town, Bo-Kaap	The Cape	Provincial Heritage Site	33°55′17″S 18°24′54″E	Upload Photo
9/2/018/0264/001	Bo-Kaap Museum, 71 Wale Street, Cape Town	Type of site: House Previous use: House. Current use: Museum. The portions of the Malay Quarter specified in the Schedule are interesting and historical parts of Cape Town, with a special character derived from the customs and ways of life peculiar to the Malays that live there.	Cape Town, Bo-Kaap	The Cape	Provincial Heritage Site	33°55′20″S 18°24′59″E	Type of site: House Previous use: House. Current use: Museum. The portions of the Malay Quarter specified in the Schedule are interesting and historical parts of Cape Town, with a special character derived from the customs and ways of life peculiar to the Malays that live there.
9/2/018/0264/002	73 Wale Street, Bo-Kaap, Cape Town	The portions of the Malay Quarter specified in the Schedule are interesting and historical parts of Cape Town, with a special character derived from the customs and ways of life peculiar to the Malays that live there.	Cape Town, Bo-Kaap	The Cape	Provincial Heritage Site	33°55′17″S 18°24′54″E	The portions of the Malay Quarter specified in the Schedule are interesting and historical parts of Cape Town, with a special character derived from the customs and ways of life peculiar to the Malays that live there.
9/2/018/0264/003	85 Chiappini Street, Bo-Kaap, Cape Town	The portions of the Malay Quarter specified in the Schedule are interesting and historical parts of Cape Town, with a special character derived from the customs and ways of life peculiar to the Malays that live there.	Cape Town, Bo-Kaap	The Cape	Provincial Heritage Site	33°55′14″S 18°24′54″E	The portions of the Malay Quarter specified in the Schedule are interesting and historical parts of Cape Town, with a special character derived from the customs and ways of life peculiar to the Malays that live there.
9/2/018/0264/005	46 Rose Street, Bo-Kaap, Cape Town	The portions of the Malay Quarter specified in the Schedule are interesting and historical parts of Cape Town, with a special character derived from the customs and ways of life peculiar to the Malays that live there.	Cape Town, Bo-Kaap	The Cape	Provincial Heritage Site	33°55′12″S 18°24′59″E	The portions of the Malay Quarter specified in the Schedule are interesting and historical parts of Cape Town, with a special character derived from the customs and ways of life peculiar to the Malays that live there.
9/2/018/0264/006	126 Church Street, Bo-Kaap, Cape Town	Type of site: House. The portions of the Malay Quarter specified in the Schedule are interesting and historical parts of Cape Town, with a special character derived from the customs and ways of life peculiar to the Malays that live there.	Cape Town, Bo-Kaap	The Cape	Provincial Heritage Site	33°55′13″S 18°24′55″E	Upload Photo
9/2/018/0264/007	200 Longmarket Street, Bo-Kaap, Cape Town	The portions of the Malay Quarter specified in the Schedule are interesting and historical parts of Cape Town, with a special character derived from the customs and ways of life peculiar to the Malays that live there.	Cape Town, Bo-Kaap	The Cape	Provincial Heritage Site	33°55′11″S 18°24′57″E	The portions of the Malay Quarter specified in the Schedule are interesting and historical parts of Cape Town, with a special character derived from the customs and ways of life peculiar to the Malays that live there.
9/2/018/0264/008	18 Helliger Lane, Bo-Kaap, Cape Town	The portions of the Malay Quarter specified in the Schedule are interesting and historical parts of Cape Town, with a special character derived from the customs and ways of life peculiar to the Malays that live there.	Cape Town, Bo-Kaap	The Cape	Provincial Heritage Site	33°55′14″S 18°24′55″E	Upload Photo
9/2/018/0264/009	93 Shortmarket Street, Bo-Kaap, Cape Town	The portions of the Malay Quarter specified in the Schedule are interesting and historical parts of Cape Town, with a special character derived from the customs and ways of life peculiar to the Malays that live there.	Cape Town, Bo-Kaap	The Cape	Provincial Heritage Site	33°55′11″S 18°24′58″E	Upload Photo
9/2/018/0266	Schotse Kloof, 79 Dorp Street, Bo-Kaap, Cape Town		Cape Town, Bo-Kaap	The Cape	Provisional Protection	33°55′17″S 18°24′49″E	
9/2/018/0285	Lion Battery, Military Road, Cape Town			Cape Town			
9/2/018/0287	Spolander House, 97 Dorp Street, Bo-Kaap, Cape Town		Cape Town, Bo-Kaap	The Cape	Provincial Heritage Site	33°55′14″S 18°24′48″E	Upload Photo
9/2/018/0288	Villa Maria, 1 Kloofnek Road, Tamboerskloof, Cape Town			Cape Town		33°55′49″S 18°24′34″E	Upload Photo
9/2/018/0292	TAMBOERSKLOOF LOCAL			Cape Town			Upload Photo
9/2/018/0294	81 Dorp Street, Bo Kaap			Cape Town		33°55′16″S 18°24′48″E	Upload Photo
9/2/018/0297	Culembourg Site, Cape Town			Cape Town			Upload Photo
9/2/018/0300	Nurul Islam Mosque, Buitengraght Street, Cape Town			Cape Town		33°55′19″S 18°24′55″E	Upload Photo
