= Northern Cape Heritage Resources Authority =

Coordinates: 28°44′8″S 24°45′56″E

Northern Cape Heritage Resources Authority (formerly Ngwao Boswa jwa Kapa Bokone – Heritage Northern Cape)
- Formation: 2003
- Headquarters: 1 Monridge Office Park, Monument Heights, Kimberley, Northern Cape
- Region served: Northern Cape Province, South Africa
- Main organ: Council
- Website: www.nbkb.org.za

The Northern Cape Heritage Resources Authority, previously called Ngwao Boswa jwa Kapa Bokone (seTswana for 'Heritage Northern Cape'), and commonly known as 'Boswa', is a provincial heritage resources authority established in 2003 by the MEC for Sport, Arts and Culture in the Northern Cape Province of South Africa, and reconstituted in terms of the Northern Cape Heritage Resources Authority Act, 2013. It is an institution set up under the terms of the National Heritage Resources Act. It is mandated to care for that part of South Africa's national estate that is of provincial and local significance in the Northern Cape.

The Heritage Authority is best known as the custodian of the approximately 130 provincial heritage sites in the province, but is also responsible for administration of other forms of protection of heritage established under the terms of the National Heritage Resources Act.

== History ==
The Northern Cape Heritage Resources Authority (sometimes referred to as 'Ngwao Boswa') is the successor body to the former National Monuments Council in the Northern Cape Province of South Africa. Under the 1996 Constitution of South Africa cultural matters are a competency shared between national and provincial government. This necessitated the creation of a system whereby many of the responsibilities of the former National Monuments Council were devolved to provincial level via the National Heritage Resources Act.

The Northern Cape Provincial Government elected initially to use provisions of the National Heritage Resources Act which allowed it to establish a provincial heritage resources authority (PHRA): 'Ngwao Boswa' was established by regulation on 28 February 2003. On 11 October 2003 the council appointed by the MEC for Sport, Arts and Culture met for the first time and has since met regularly. The council established a sub-committee known as the 'Permits Committee' which met monthly to consider applications under the terms of the National Heritage Resources Act. The council also established an executive committee.

The Northern Cape Heritage Resources Authority Act, 2013, reconstitutes the council and provides for the governance of the authority, determining its objects, functions and operation, and regulating staff and financial matters.

The authority inherited responsibility for approximately 130 former national monuments, now known as 'provincial heritage sites'. The National Heritage Resources Act provides for a greater variety of protection than did its predecessor and the organisation has continued to institute protections of various forms under its terms. A large part of this work is dedicated to transforming the heritage landscape of the Northern Cape Province to ensure that the heritage of all its people enjoys equal recognition and appropriate protection.

=== Logo ===
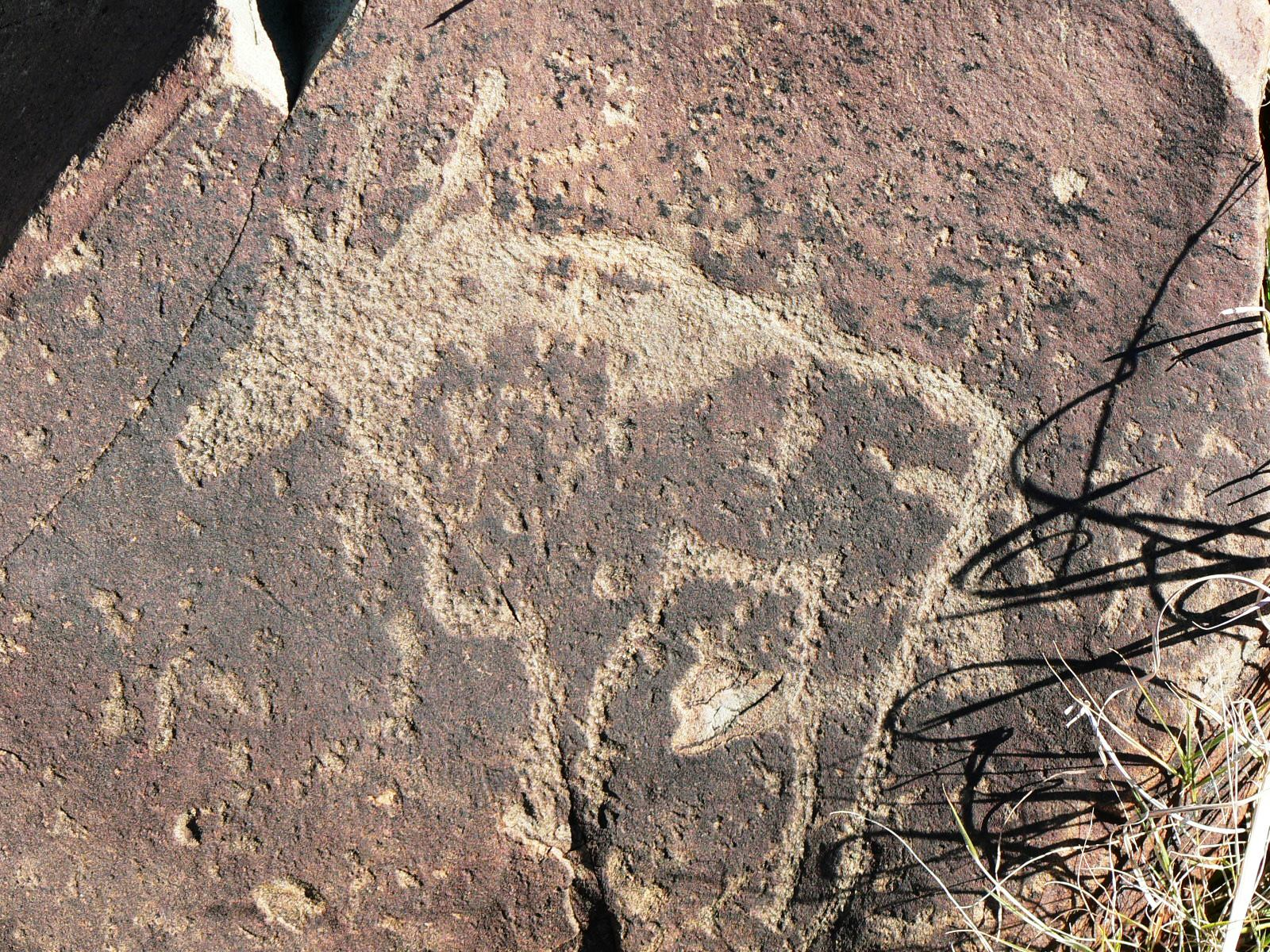
The rock engraving of an eland at the Wildebeest Kuil Rock Art Centre on which the logo of 'Ngwao Boswa' is based.

The Logo of the organisation is based on a rock engraving of an eland from the Wildebeest Kuil rock art site, the first new provincial heritage site to be declared by the organisation following its establishment.

=== Name ===
The initial name of the organisation was a rendition of 'Heritage Northern Cape' in the seTswana language, also translated as 'Erfenis Noord-Kaap' in Afrikaans and 'Amafa Asemntla Koloni' in isiXhosa, English, Afrikaans and isiXhosa being the other three official languages of the province.

From its inception there was controversy over the correct translation of the term 'Heritage Northern Cape' into seTswana, the regulation establishing the organisation spelling it 'Taolo Ya Ngoa Boshwa Kapa Bokoni'. It was also frequently referred to, more correctly, as 'Ngwao-Boshwa [or Boswa] ya [or jwa] Kapa Bokone'.

New legislation, published in March 2014, gives the name of the organisation as Northern Cape Heritage Resources Authority.

== SAHRA and the Northern Cape Heritage Resources Authority's Mandate ==
The Northern Cape Heritage Resources Authority is subject to a biennial assessment of competency by the South African Heritage Resources Agency, SAHRA, in terms of which it is determined which aspects of the National Heritage Resources Act it is qualified to implement. It has been assessed as competent to deal with all areas over which a provincial heritage resources authority is permitted to act, aside from Sections 35 and 36 of the Act which cover certain aspects relating to archaeology, palaeontology, graves and burials.

== Categories of heritage resource for which Northern Cape Heritage Resources Authority is responsible ==
The Northern Cape Heritage Resources Authority is responsible for sites that fall within the following categories:

- Buildings and structures of architectural, historical, technical and aesthetic value
- Places to which oral traditions intangible values are attached
- Historical settlements and towns
- Landscapes and natural features
- Geological sites
- Battlefields
- Sites associated with slavery

== Staff Complement ==
The Council of the Northern Cape Heritage Resources Authority employs the staff of the organisation, although up to 2011 staff were employees of the Northern Cape Department of Sport, Arts and Culture.

== Formally Protected Sites ==
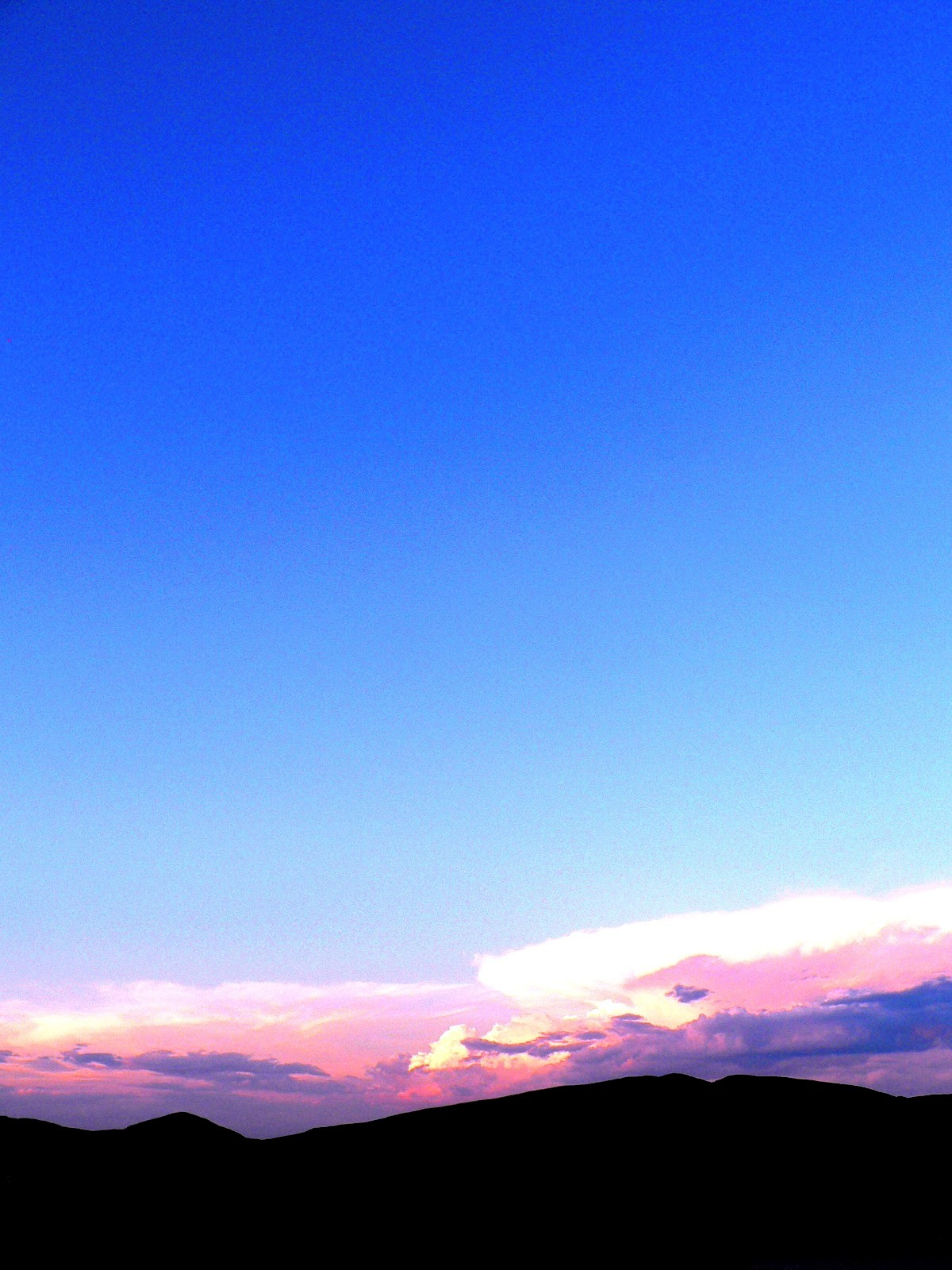
Sunset near Rooiberg, Richtersveld World Heritage Site.

Approximately 130 sites in the Northern Cape are formally protected as provincial heritage sites. Most of these were declared under legislation that predates the National Heritage Resources Act and were previously known as 'national monuments'. One new provincial heritage site has been declared by the Northern Cape Heritage Resources Authority, that being the Wildebeest Kuil rock art site which was gazetted on 19 September 2008. The organisation is also responsible for the Richtersveld World Heritage Site which was gazetted as a heritage area on 18 June 2007. In cooperation with municipalities, several other heritage areas have been established in terms of Section 31 of the National Heritage Resources Act and municipal spatial development frameworks. These are in the following towns:

- Calvinia and Nieuwoudtville in the Hantam Local Municipality
- Carnarvon in the Kareeberg Local Municipality
- Fraserburg in the Karoo Hoogland Local Municipality
- Port Nolloth in the Richtersveld Local Municipality
- Kimberley in the Sol Plaatje Local Municipality,
- Colesberg in the Umsobomvu Local Municipality

== Funding ==
The Northern Cape Heritage Resources Authority receives an annual transfer payment from the Northern Cape Department of Sport, Arts and Culture.

== Literature ==
- http://www.dac.gov.za/acts/a25-99.pdf
- National Heritage Resources Act, Act 25 of 1999, Government Notice 506, Republic of South Africa Government Gazette, Vol. 406, No 19974, Cape Town, 28 April 1999
- List of heritage sites in Northern Cape

== See also ==
- Provincial heritage resources authority
- Provincial heritage site (South Africa)
- Heritage objects (South Africa)
- South African Heritage Resource Agency
- Amafa aKwaZulu-Natali
- Heritage Western Cape
- National Monuments Council (South Africa and Namibia)
- Historical Monuments Commission
- List of heritage sites in Northern Cape
