= Motsetsi =

Archaeological cave site in Gauteng, South Africa

Motsetse Fossil Site, Cradle of Humankind
- Location within Gauteng
- Location: Gauteng, South Africa
- Nearest city: Krugersdorp, South Africa
- Coordinates: 25°54′30″S 27°49′57″E
- Established: Incorporated into the Cradle of Humankind 1999
- Governing body: Cradle of Humankind and private landowner

Motsetsi Cave (also known as Motsetse) is a fossil-bearing breccia filled cavity located about 14 kilometres (8.7 mi) east of the well known South African hominid-bearing sites of Sterkfontein and Kromdraai and about 45 kilometres (28 mi) north-northwest of Johannesburg, South Africa. Motsetsi has been declared a South African National Heritage Site.

== History of investigations ==
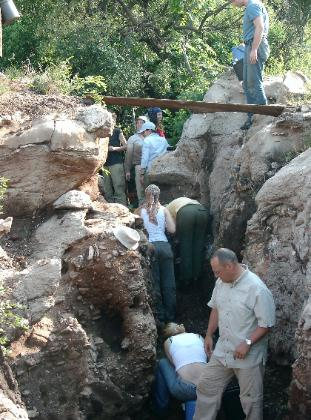
Students digging in the main excavation at Motsetse Cave. Peter Schmid, long-time collaborator is in the foreground.

Motsetsi has been investigated since its discovery by Lee Berger in 1999. Since then a series of part-time excavations have recovered tens of thousands of fossils. Excavations have been conducted at Motsetse by the University of the Witwatersrand and at times in conjunction with Peter Schmid of the University of Zurich. Only a very small part of this site has been excavated.

== Recovered fossils ==
Of the many thousands of fossils recovered from Motsetsi, no hominid fossils have yet been found. Many very fine fossils of other animals, however, have been discovered including the remains of very well preserved Dinofelis fossils – a type of false saber-toothed cat.

=== Geology ===
Motsetse is a series of breccia-filled dolomitic caves that formed in a fissure along a geological fault.

Various deposits of Motsetse

==== Age of the deposits ====
Motsetsi has been dated to 1.0 to 1.6 million years old based on the animals recovered.
