= Provincial heritage site (South Africa) =

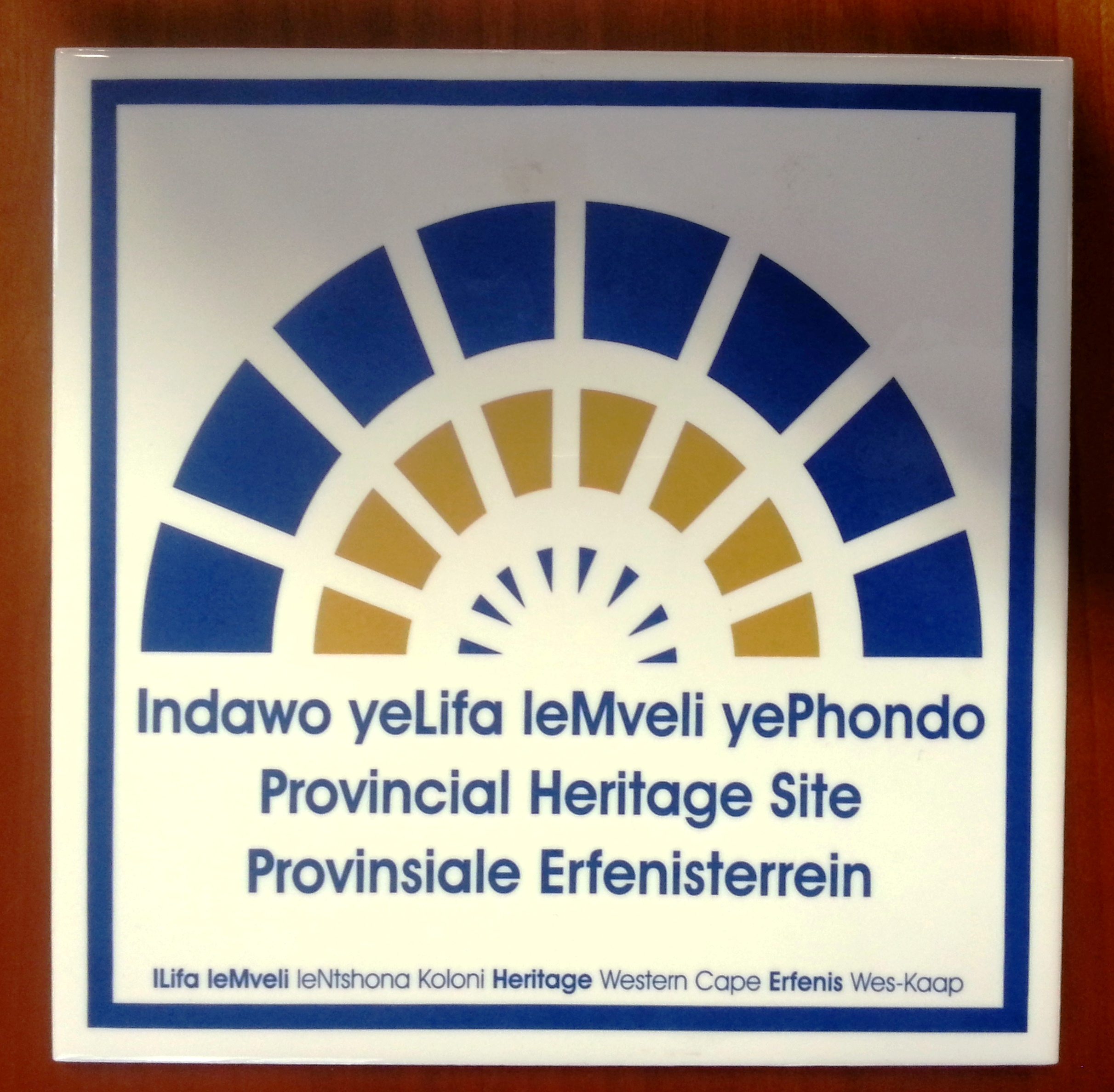
The marker used to designate Provincial Heritage Sites in the Western Cape Province of South Africa.

Provincial heritage sites in South Africa are places that are of historic or cultural importance within the context of the province concerned and which are for this reason declared in terms of Section 28 of the National Heritage Resources Act (NHRA) or legislation of the applicable province. The designation was a new one that came into effect with the introduction of the Act on 1 April 2000 when all former national monuments declared by the former National Monuments Council and its predecessors became provincial heritage sites as provided for in Section 58 of the Act.

Both provincial and national heritage sites are protected under the terms of Section 27 of the NHRA or legislation of the relevant province and a permit is required to work on them. Provincial heritage sites are declared and administered by the relevant provincial heritage resources authority whilst national heritage sites are the responsibility of SAHRA.

KwaZulu-Natal is the only province to have its own heritage legislation and provincial heritage sites are known as either 'heritage landmarks' or 'provincial landmarks' depending upon whether they are privately or government owned.

Most provincial heritage sites are still marked with an old national monuments badge, but provincial heritage resources authorities in KwaZulu-Natal, the Northern Cape and Western Cape have developed their own badges.

== List of Heritage sites by province ==
The lists have been split up by province. Some districts have been split off from their province for site performance reasons.

- List of heritage sites in Eastern Cape
- List of heritage sites in Albany
- List of heritage sites in Graaff-Reinet
- List of heritage sites in Port Elizabeth
- List of heritage sites in Free State
- List of heritage sites in Gauteng
- List of heritage sites in KwaZulu-Natal
- List of heritage sites in Pietermaritzburg
- List of heritage sites in Limpopo
- List of heritage sites in Mpumalanga
- List of heritage sites in North West
- List of heritage sites in Northern Cape
- List of heritage sites in Colesberg
- List of heritage sites in Kimberley
- List of heritage sites in Richmond
- List of heritage sites in Victoria West
- List of heritage sites in Western Cape
- List of heritage sites in Paarl
- List of heritage sites in Simonstown
- List of heritage sites in Stellenbosch
- List of heritage sites in Swellendam
- List of heritage sites in Table Mountain
- List of heritage sites in the Cape
- List of heritage sites in Tulbagh
- List of heritage sites in Worcester
- List of heritage sites in Wynberg

== See also ==
- List of heritage sites in South Africa
- Heritage objects (South Africa)
- South African Heritage Resources Agency
- Amafa aKwaZulu-Natali
- Heritage Western Cape
- National Monuments Council (South Africa and Namibia)
