= National Heritage Council of Namibia =

- Abbreviation: NHC
- Formation: 2004; 22 years ago
- Legal status: Active
- Headquarters: 52 Robert Mugabe Avenue, Ausspannplatz, Windhoek, Namibia
- Region served: Namibia
- Leader: Moses Moses (Acting Chairperson); Erica Ndalikokule (Director)
- Main organ: Council
- Website: nhc-nam.org

The National Heritage Council of Namibia (NHC) is a government organisation in Namibia, responsible for historic preservation. It was created through the National Heritage Act, Number 27 of 2004.

The NHC is mandated "to provide for the protection and conservation of places and objects of heritage significance and the registration of such places and objects; to establish a National Heritage Council; to establish a National Heritage Register; and to provide for incidental matters".

The organisation is the successor to the National Monuments Council, an organisation set up under the National Monuments Act of South Africa which applied in Namibia during the period of South African rule and during the first fourteen years of independence.

In 2007, the National Heritage Register was created as the central repository authorised by the 2004 act.

== Notable structures and sites ==
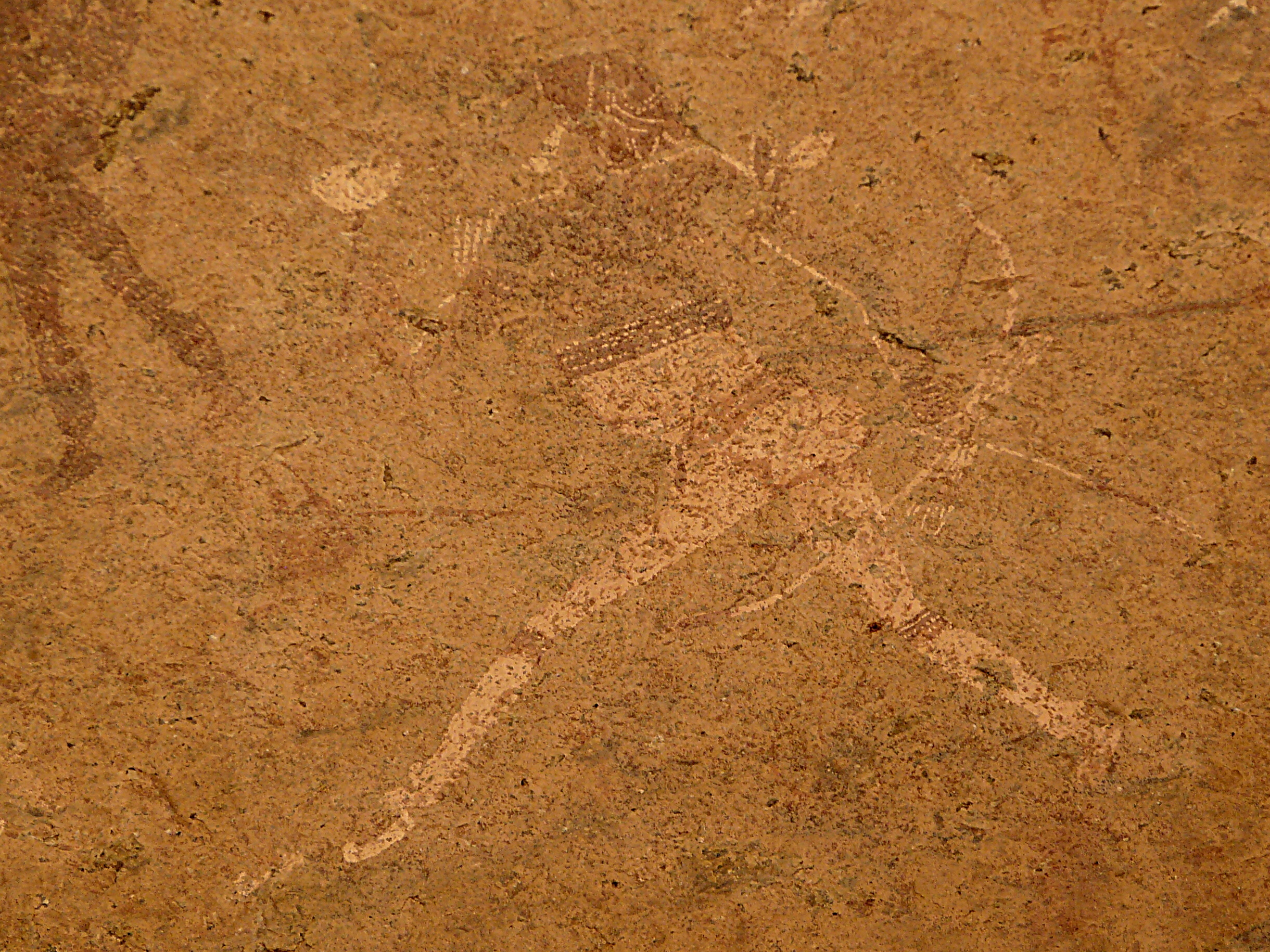
The 'White Lady' rock painting at the Brandberg heritage place on which the logo of the NHC is based.

- Battle of Ohamakari, the site of a battle during the Herero and Nama genocide, located near Okakarara
- Eenhana Memorial Shrine
- Heroes Acre near Windhoek

=== Proposed sites ===
- Gobabis Fountain in Gobabis
- Hosea Kutako's homestead in Omaheke Region
- Okapendje, site of several Namibian deaths in the South African Border War
- Omuhaturua site of killing of San and Ovaherero people during the genocide

== See also ==
- History of Namibia
