= National Monuments Council (South Africa and Namibia) =

Former government agency of South Africa

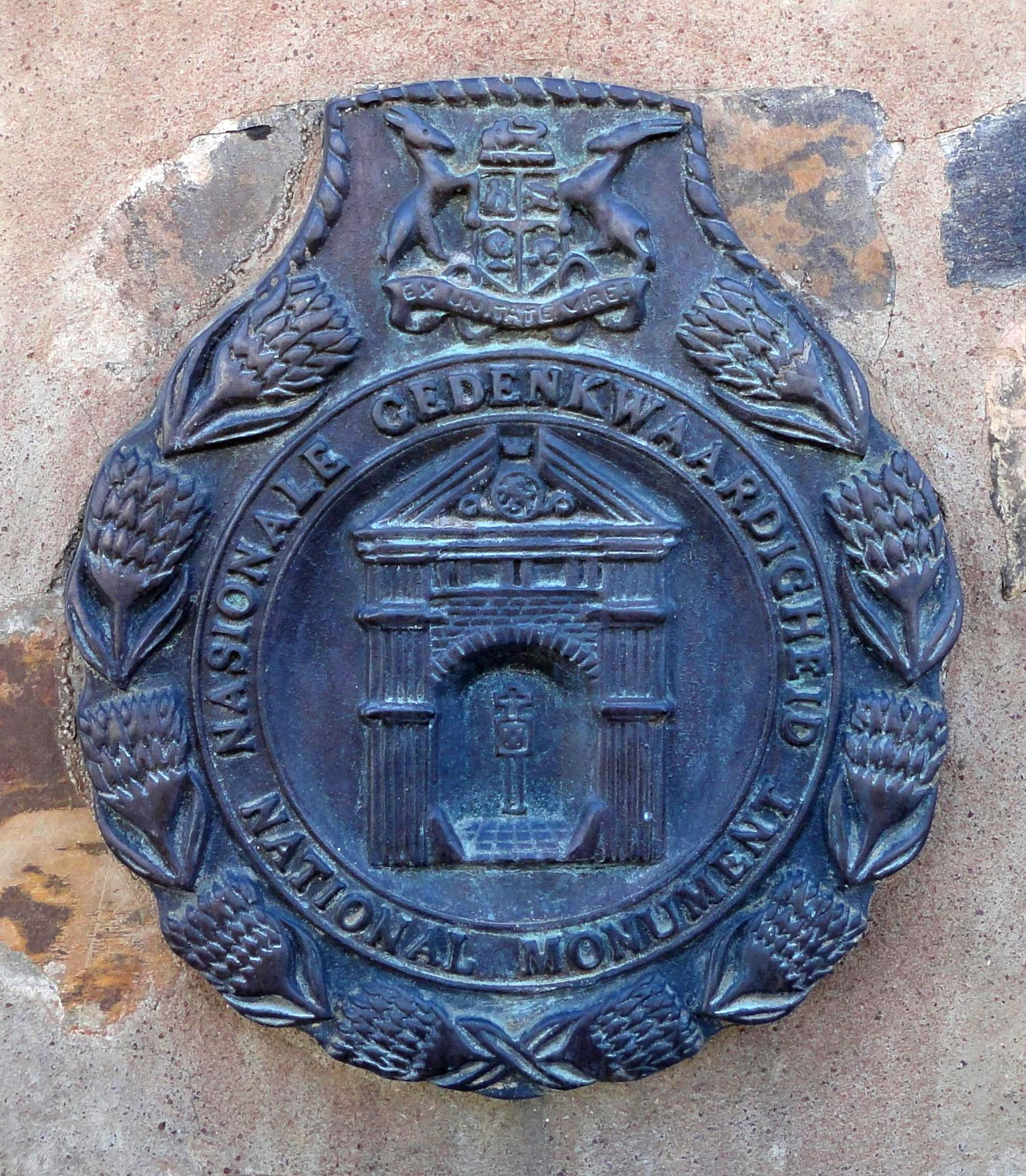
- Badge formerly used on national monuments
- Abbreviation: NMC
- Successor: National Heritage Council of South Africa; National Heritage Council of Namibia
- Established: 1969; 57 years ago
- Dissolved: 2000; 26 years ago
- Legal status: Defunct
- Region served: South Africa and Namibia

The National Monuments Council (NMC) was the national heritage conservation authority of South Africa, and therefore also of Namibia (when South Africa occupied its territory), during the major part of the apartheid era. It was the successor body to the Historical Monuments Commission and became known principally for its declaration of several thousand national monuments.

The NMC came into being through the promulgation of the National Monuments Act of 1969 and ceased to exist on 31 March 2000 when it was replaced by SAHRA and the provincial heritage resources authorities established in terms of the National Heritage Resources Act of 1999.

== History ==
The National Monuments Council was the successor to the Historical Monuments Commission which had been in existence since 1923 and upon its creation the 'historical monuments' declared by the Commission became known as 'national monuments'.

Like its predecessor, it was a statutory body, semi-independent of government and presided over by a council appointed by the Minister responsible for culture. It had its head office in Cape Town rather than the national capital Pretoria.

This reflected its preoccupation with the heritage of the early colonial (Dutch) period, the area around Cape Town being the most densely colonised during that time and hence the area in which most remnants of Dutch colonialism in South Africa are located. This is borne out by the fact that around half of the national monuments declared by the NMC were located in what is now the Western Cape Province.

=== The Apartheid Era ===
Most of the period of existence the NMC fell within the apartheid era. During this period the organisation was governed by a Council made up exclusively of white South Africans and had a professional staff of similar composition. However, from not long after PW Botha's introduction of the Tricameral Parliament in 1984 the membership of the Council included one representative from each of the Coloured and Indian communities. During the de Klerk era (1989–1994) the organisation began to shift focus and declared a number of sites important to the history of the African community, including those associated with anti-apartheid movements, commencing with the declaration of the Sol Plaatje House in Kimberley in 1992.

=== Post-Apartheid ===
From 1994, under the post-Apartheid government, the make-up and focus of the organisation began to change to reflect the changes in South African society. During this period the composition of the council and professional staff came to reflect the demographics of the country and a concerted effort was made to declare sites that reflected a broader national heritage.

At the end of March 2000, the National Monuments Council was replaced by the South African Heritage Resources Agency, SAHRA, and over the following years the establishment of provincial heritage resources authorities saw the shift of the majority of its functions to provincial level. In terms of Section 58 of the National Heritage Resources Act national monuments became the responsibility of provincial heritage resources authorities and are now known as provincial heritage sites. A new category of national heritage site was created and is the responsibility of SAHRA.

=== Independence of Namibia ===
In 1990, when the territory of South West Africa became Namibia, the National Monuments Act remained in force and a National Monuments Council was established for the newly independent country. This organisation continued to operate until the promulgation of the Namibian Heritage Act of 2004 in terms of which the National Heritage Council was established.

=== Legacy ===
The most noticeable legacy of the National Monuments Council is the bronze badge which still adorns most provincial heritage sites in South Africa and heritage places in Namibia. The term 'national monument' is still used by most South Africans and Namibians to refer to anything protected in terms of heritage legislation.

More fundamental inheritances of present heritage resources authorities are:

- The lists of provincial heritage sites and heritage places is heavily biased towards colonial heritage and the built environment.
- There is a lack of integration of heritage management into the planning systems of local government, a legacy of the lack of relevant provisions in the National Monuments Act.
- A lack of understanding of the importance and relevance of heritage conservation amongst the majority of South Africans and Namibians stemming from the focus of the NMC being for most of its existence mainly on heritage relevant to the white community.

== Logo ==
The logo of the National Monuments Council was almost the same as that used by its predecessor, the Historical Monuments Commission. It depicts the entrance gate of the Cape Town Castle (the first historical monument to be declared by the commission) surrounded by a wreath of King Proteas (South Africa's national flower) and capped with the national coat of arms that was used between 1910 and 2000.

The only change from the Historical Monuments Commission period is the inclusion of a padrão in the centre of the castle gateway, a symbol of the Portuguese 'discovery' of Africa and apparently symbolic of the inclusion of South West Africa (now Namibia) within the area of jurisdiction of the organisation.

== Offices ==
The Head Office of the National Monuments Council was in Cape Town and for most of its existence was the only base from which the organisation operated. From the mid-1980s 'regional offices' were established. The first was in Pretoria to service the then Transvaal province and thereafter in the other two provinces of the time, the Orange Free State (Bloemfontein) and Natal (initially Durban, but later Pietermaritzburg) provinces.

The Cape Province came to be served by regional offices in Cape Town (Western Cape), Kimberley (Northern Cape) and Grahamstown (Eastern Cape). An office was also established in Windhoek, the capital of the South African governed territory of South West Africa.

Following the establishment of nine provinces in 1994 the boundaries of the regions served were brought into line with those of provinces and over the next few years what were now called 'provincial offices' were established in those provinces that did not yet have an office. With the coming into effect of the National Heritage Resources Act in 1999, the records and in some cases staff of these offices were taken over by provincial heritage resources authorities.

== Funding ==
The National Monuments Council received the bulk of its funds as a transfer payment from the department of the Minister responsible for culture. For most of its history this was the Department of National Education, but after 1994 the Department of Arts, Culture Science and Technology.

The organisation also administered a number of trust funds established for the care of particular sites or types of heritage and derived income from properties which it owned, most notably Dal Josaphat near Paarl in the Western Cape.

== Successor organisations ==
The following organisations are successors to the National Monuments Council:

- Amafa aKwaZulu-Natali (KwaZulu-Natal Province)
- Eastern Cape Provincial Heritage Resources Authority (Eastern Cape Province)
- Heritage Free State (Free State Province)
- Heritage Western Cape (Western Cape Province)
- Limpopo Provincial Heritage Resources Authority (Limpopo Province)
- Mpumalanga Provincial Heritage Resources Authority (Mpumalanga Province)
- Northern Cape Heritage Resources Authority, (Northern Cape Province)
- National Heritage Council of Namibia
- North West Provincial Heritage Resources Authority (North West Province)
- Provincial Heritage Resources Authority Gauteng (Gauteng Province)
- South African Heritage Resources Agency (SAHRA)

In Namibia the National Heritage Council is the successor in all respects whereas in South Africa the National Heritage Resources Act, specifically, but not exclusively Sections11-13, 23–26 and 58 thereof, establish how responsibilities are divided between the South African Heritage Resources Agency and provincial heritage resources authorities.

== See also ==
- Amafa aKwaZulu-Natali
- Heritage Western Cape
- Northern Cape Heritage Resources Authority
- National Heritage Council of Namibia
- South African Heritage Resources Agency
- Historical Monuments Commission
- Provincial heritage site (South Africa)
- National heritage site (South Africa)
- Heritage objects (South Africa)
- List of heritage sites in South Africa
