= List of heritage sites in Table Mountain =

This is a list of the heritage sites in Table Mountain (City of Cape Town Metropolitan Municipality) as recognized by the South African Heritage Resources Agency.

SAHRA identifier	Site name	Description	Town	District	NHRA status	Coordinates	Image
9/2/018/0022				Table Mountain	Provincial Heritage Site	33°57′37″S 18°25′05″E	Media related to Table Mountain at Wikimedia Commons
9/2/018/0022-066	Erf 3559, Hout Bay			Table Mountain	Provincial Heritage Site	34°00′24″S 18°22′40″E	Upload Photo
9/2/018/0022-069	Erf 3560, Hout Bay			Table Mountain	Provincial Heritage Site	34°00′25″S 18°22′42″E	Upload Photo
9/2/018/0022-070	Erf 1174, Tamboerskloof			Table Mountain	Provincial Heritage Site	33°55′35″S 18°23′55″E	Upload Photo
9/2/018/0022-071	Erf 2977, Hout Bay			Table Mountain	Provincial Heritage Site	34°00′26″S 18°22′17″E	Upload Photo
9/2/018/0022-072	Erf 12, Fresnaye			Table Mountain	Provincial Heritage Site	33°55′49″S 18°23′08″E	Upload Photo
9/2/018/0022-073	Erf 3079, Hout Bay			Table Mountain	Provincial Heritage Site	34°02′00″S 18°21′00″E	
9/2/018/0022-074	Erf 1, Fresnaye			Table Mountain	Provincial Heritage Site	33°55′30″S 18°23′15″E	Upload Photo
9/2/018/0022-075	Erf 1171, Tamboerskloof			Table Mountain	Provincial Heritage Site	33°55′45″S 18°24′15″E	Upload Photo
9/2/018/0022-076	Erf 1175, Tamboerskloof			Table Mountain	Provincial Heritage Site	33°55′45″S 18°24′15″E	Upload Photo
9/2/018/0022-077	Erf 1173, Tamboerskloof			Table Mountain	Provincial Heritage Site	33°55′45″S 18°24′15″E	Upload Photo
9/2/018/0022-078	Erf 1815, Vredehoek			Table Mountain	Provincial Heritage Site	33°56′15″S 18°25′30″E	Upload Photo
9/2/018/0022-079	Erf 1762, Hout Bay			Table Mountain	Provincial Heritage Site	34°02′00″S 18°21′00″E	Upload Photo
9/2/018/0022-080	Erf 1140, Tamboerskloof			Table Mountain	Provincial Heritage Site	33°55′45″S 18°24′15″E	Upload Photo
9/2/018/0022-081	Erf 1033, Tamboerskloof			Table Mountain	Provincial Heritage Site	33°55′45″S 18°24′15″E	Upload Photo
9/2/018/0022-082	Erf 1362, Fresnaye			Table Mountain	Provincial Heritage Site	33°55′30″S 18°23′15″E	Upload Photo
9/2/018/0022-083	Erf 1243, Fresnaye			Table Mountain	Provincial Heritage Site	33°55′30″S 18°23′15″E	Upload Photo
9/2/018/0022-084	Erf 13, Fresnaye			Table Mountain	Provincial Heritage Site	33°55′30″S 18°23′15″E	Upload Photo
9/2/018/0022-085	Erf 1250, Fresnaye			Table Mountain	Provincial Heritage Site	33°55′30″S 18°23′15″E	Upload Photo
9/2/018/0022-086	Erf 1251, Fresnaye			Table Mountain	Provincial Heritage Site	33°55′30″S 18°23′15″E	Upload Photo
9/2/018/0022-087	Erf 1244, Fresnaye			Table Mountain	Provincial Heritage Site	33°55′30″S 18°23′15″E	Upload Photo
9/2/018/0022-088	Erf 1172, Tamboerskloof			Table Mountain	Provincial Heritage Site	33°55′45″S 18°24′15″E	Upload Photo
9/2/018/0022-089	Erf 512, Fresnaye			Table Mountain	Provincial Heritage Site	33°55′30″S 18°23′15″E	Upload Photo
9/2/018/0022-091	Erf 2, Fresnaye			Table Mountain	Provincial Heritage Site	33°55′30″S 18°23′15″E	Upload Photo
9/2/018/0022-092	Erf 1231, Fresnaye			Table Mountain	Provincial Heritage Site	33°55′30″S 18°23′15″E	Upload Photo
9/2/018/0022-093	Erf 1242, Fresnaye			Table Mountain	Provincial Heritage Site	33°55′30″S 18°23′15″E	Upload Photo
9/2/018/0022-094	Erf 14, Fresnaye			Table Mountain	Provincial Heritage Site	33°55′30″S 18°23′15″E	Upload Photo
9/2/018/0022-095	Erf 1412, Fresnaye			Table Mountain	Provincial Heritage Site	33°55′30″S 18°23′15″E	Upload Photo
9/2/018/0022-096	Erf 3, Fresnaye			Table Mountain	Provincial Heritage Site	33°55′30″S 18°23′15″E	Upload Photo
9/2/018/0022-097	Erf 1033, Tamboerskloof			Table Mountain	Provincial Heritage Site	33°55′45″S 18°24′15″E	Upload Photo
9/2/018/0022-098	Erf 1738, Hout Bay			Table Mountain	Provincial Heritage Site	34°02′00″S 18°21′00″E	Upload Photo
9/2/018/0022-100	Erf 1749, Hout Bay			Table Mountain	Provincial Heritage Site	34°02′00″S 18°21′00″E	Upload Photo
9/2/018/0022-102	Erf 1759, Hout Bay			Table Mountain	Provincial Heritage Site	34°02′00″S 18°21′00″E	Upload Photo
9/2/018/0022-103	Erf 1734, Hout Bay			Table Mountain	Provincial Heritage Site	34°02′00″S 18°21′00″E	Upload Photo
9/2/018/0022-104	Erf 1737, Hout Bay			Table Mountain	Provincial Heritage Site	34°02′00″S 18°21′00″E	Upload Photo
9/2/018/0022-105	Erf 1756, Hout Bay			Table Mountain	Provincial Heritage Site	34°02′00″S 18°21′00″E	Upload Photo
9/2/018/0022-106	Erf 2939, Hout Bay			Table Mountain	Provincial Heritage Site	34°02′00″S 18°21′00″E	Upload Photo
9/2/018/0022-108	Erf 614, Vredehoek			Table Mountain	Provincial Heritage Site	33°56′15″S 18°25′30″E	Upload Photo
9/2/018/0022-113	Erf 956, Tamboerskloof			Table Mountain	Provincial Heritage Site	33°55′45″S 18°24′15″E	
9/2/018/0022-114	Erf 1139, Vredehoek			Table Mountain	Provincial Heritage Site	34°02′00″S 18°21′00″E	Upload Photo
9/2/018/0022-118	Erf 658, Oranjezicht			Table Mountain	Provincial Heritage Site	33°56′30″S 18°24′50″E	Upload Photo
9/2/018/0022-119	Erf 1966, Oranjezicht			Table Mountain	Provincial Heritage Site	33°56′30″S 18°24′50″E	Upload Photo
9/2/018/0022-120	Erf 1137, Tamboerskloof			Table Mountain	Provincial Heritage Site	33°55′45″S 18°24′15″E	Upload Photo
9/2/018/0022-122	Erf 2084, Vredehoek			Table Mountain	Provincial Heritage Site	33°56′15″S 18°25′30″E	Upload Photo
9/2/018/0022-124	Erf 12713, Woodstock			Table Mountain	Provincial Heritage Site	33°55′50″S 18°26′50″E	Upload Photo
9/2/018/0022-130	Erf 1213, Vredehoek			Table Mountain	Provincial Heritage Site	33°56′15″S 18°25′30″E	Upload Photo
9/2/018/0022/02	902 Oudekraal		Table Mountain	Table Mountain			Upload Photo
9/2/018/0022/02/1	Portion 3 of Farm 902, Oudekraal (White House Site), Table Mountain Chain		Table Mountain	Table Mountain			Upload Photo
9/2/018/0022/03	The Roundhouse			Table Mountain		33°56′37″S 18°23′06″E	Upload Photo
