= South African Heritage Resources Agency =

Heritage agency of South Africa

- Abbreviation: SAHRA
- Formation: 1 April 2000; 26 years ago
- Legal status: Public Entity
- Headquarters: 111 Harrington Street (Granite Lodge), Cape Town, South Africa
- Coordinates: 33°55′47″S 18°25′21″E
- Region served: South Africa
- Main organ: Council
- Parent organisation: Department of Sport, Arts and Culture
- Revenue: R84 million (2024)
- Website: sahra.org.za

The South African Heritage Resources Agency (SAHRA) is the national administrative body responsible for the protection of South Africa's cultural heritage. It implements a three-tier system of heritage management, in which heritage resources are managed at the national, provincial, and local levels.

SAHRA is tasked with establishing and maintaining a national inventory of heritage resources, known as the South African Heritage Resources Information System (SAHRIS), and also manages a portfolio of 36 state-owned heritage properties. The agency is governed by a council appointed by the Minister of Sport, Arts and Culture.

== History and mandate ==
SAHRA was established on 1 April 2000 following the enactment of the National Heritage Resources Act, Act 25 of 1999. This legislation replaced the former National Monuments Council and fundamentally restructured heritage management in South Africa. The Act established a three-tier system of governance, creating SAHRA at the national level, provincial heritage resources authorities (PHRAs) for each province, and empowering local authorities to manage heritage resources within their jurisdictions.

SAHRA's primary mandate is the identification, evaluation, and management of heritage resources of national significance. This includes declaring National Heritage Sites, protecting heritage objects, and regulating developments that may impact heritage resources through its permit system. It is also responsible for coordinating with PHRAs and managing the national heritage inventory.

== Organisational structure ==
SAHRA is structured into five core programmes and is led by a council and an executive team.

=== Governance and leadership ===
The agency is governed by a council appointed by the minister of sport, arts and culture. As of 2024, the council chairperson is Dr. Luyanda Mpahlwa. The executive team is responsible for daily operations and is led by chief executive officer Adv. Lungisa Malgas. Key executive roles include the chief financial officer, executive officer for heritage resources management, and executive officer for corporate services.

=== Core functions and programmes ===
SAHRA's functions are organised into five strategic programmes:

1. Administration and Governance: Manages corporate governance, legal compliance, and risk.
2. Strategic Coordination: Implements the Heritage Resources Management Coordination Plan (HRMCP).
3. Public Engagement: Focuses on knowledge dissemination and stakeholder consultation.
4. Business Development and Transformation: Drives revenue generation and property maximisation.
5. Economic Empowerment: Promotes job creation and skills development in the heritage sector.

Its core heritage management functions are carried out by specialised units, including the Burial Grounds and Graves (BBG) Unit, the Built Environment Unit, the Heritage Protection Unit, and the National Inventory Unit, which manages SAHRIS.

== South African Heritage Resources Information System (SAHRIS) ==
The South African Heritage Resources Information System (SAHRIS) is the national online inventory of heritage resources. Mandated by Section 39 of the National Heritage Resources Act, the system was developed in 2011 and publicly launched in April 2013. SAHRIS is built on the Drupal open-source platform and is freely accessible to the public and heritage professionals.

The system serves multiple functions, including:

- A national repository of declared heritage sites, objects, and archaeological finds.
- A platform for submitting and processing permit applications for development, excavation, and export.
- A management tool for heritage impact assessments and inter-agency workflows.

== Heritage asset management ==
=== Property portfolio ===
SAHRA owns and manages a portfolio of 36 heritage properties located across eight provinces. To ensure their long-term viability, the agency has implemented a Property Maximisation Strategy focused on generating revenue for financial sustainability.

=== Notable properties ===
- Dal Josafat Farm: A 232-hectare Grade 1 National Heritage Site in Paarl, Western Cape. In 2023, SAHRA entered into a 20-year commercial lease agreement with Blue Pot Renewable Energies to develop a solar energy plant on a portion of the farm, a project intended to generate sustainable income for the agency.
- SAHRA Head Office (111 Harrington Street): Located in Cape Town, the head office is housed in a Provincial Heritage Site that incorporates the historic Granite Lodge (c. 1834) and the former St. George's Orphanage. The building is currently undergoing an upgrade project to expand its capacity and modernise its facilities.

== Performance and finances ==
=== Financial performance ===
In the 2023/24 financial year, SAHRA reported a net asset value of R148.8 million, an 8% growth from the previous year. The agency's total revenue was R84.2 million, with the primary source being a R62.21 million grant from the Department of Sport, Arts and Culture. Other income sources included interest, rental revenue from its properties, and permit fees. Total expenditure amounted to R78.1 million, resulting in a surplus of R6.1 million. The 2023/24 audit marked the third consecutive year that SAHRA achieved a clean audit outcome from the Auditor-General of South Africa.

To enhance its financial sustainability, SAHRA has established a partnership with the King Baudouin Foundation United States (KBFUS) for philanthropic fundraising and created a dedicated Business Development Unit.

=== Performance and challenges ===
According to its 2023/24 Annual Report, SAHRA achieved 100% of its annual performance plan targets. Key achievements included declaring seven Kramats in Cape Town as National Heritage Sites, creating 33 indirect jobs, and maintaining a staff turnover rate of 8.9%, below the national target. The agency also conducted 21 knowledge dissemination activities, exceeding its target of 15.

Despite these successes, SAHRA faces significant challenges. Its primary funding grant from the national government has remained stagnant for four consecutive years, creating budget constraints. This has limited its capacity to fill key vacancies and invest in the maintenance of its ageing infrastructure. The agency also notes that the varying performance levels and capacity issues among Provincial Heritage Resources Authorities remain a challenge for national coordination.

== Research and education ==
SAHRA engages in various research and educational collaborations to promote professional development in the heritage sector. It partners with institutions like the University of Cape Town to offer short courses in Heritage Resource Management.

The agency also manages the J.J. Oberholster Library, located at its Cape Town head office. It is a leading heritage conservation repository, holding over 13,000 books and 11,000 journals. The library is available by appointment to the public, students, and researchers.

== Heritage management in South Africa ==
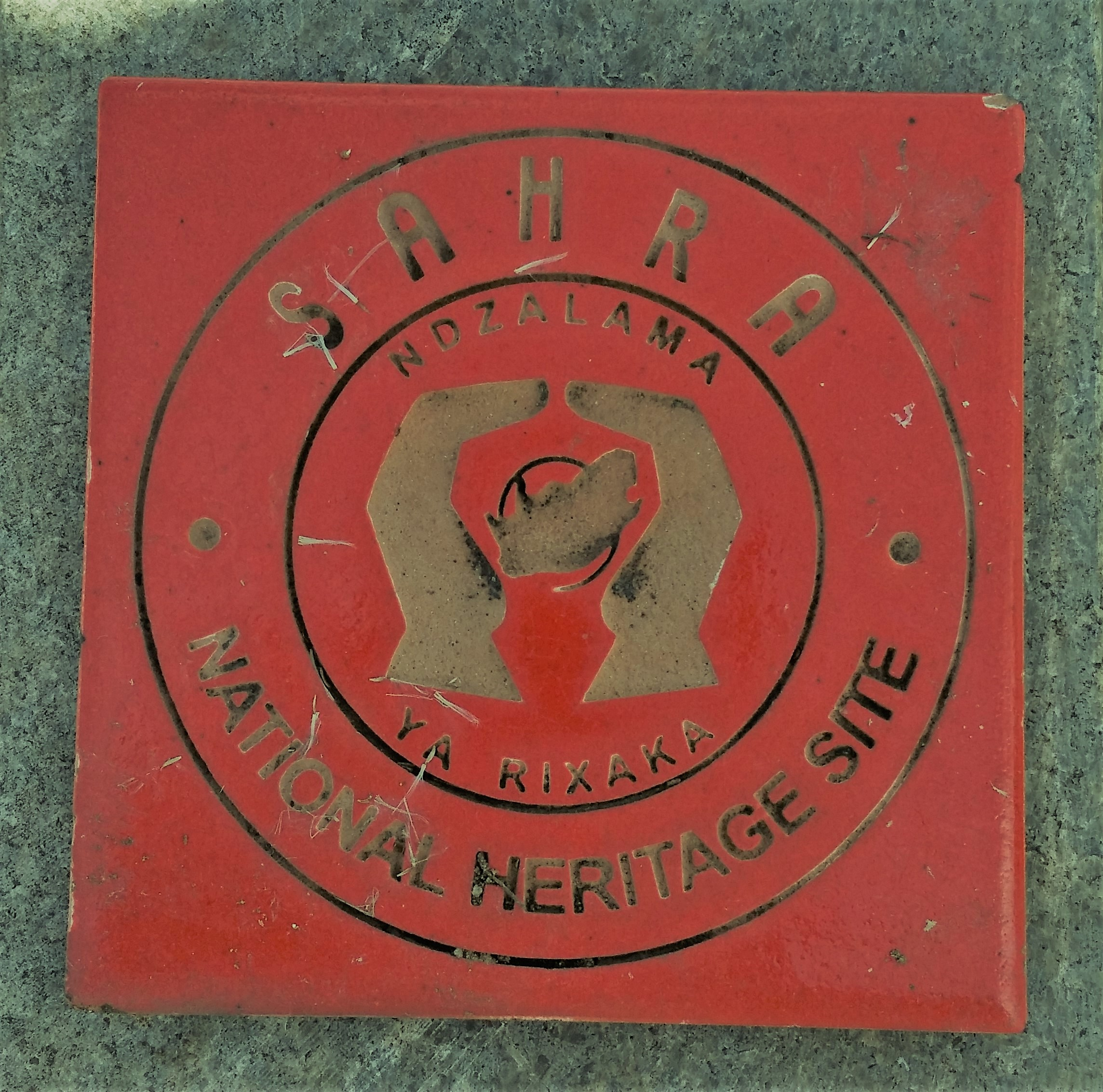
The marker used to indicate National Heritage Sites designated by SAHRA.

The National Heritage Resources Act created a three-tier system for heritage management, with sites graded according to their significance:

- Grade I: Heritage resources of national significance, managed by SAHRA.
- Grade II: Heritage resources of provincial significance, managed by the relevant PHRA.
- Grade III: Other heritage resources worthy of conservation, managed by local authorities.

SAHRA is also involved in the management and coordination of South Africa's 12 UNESCO World Heritage Sites, which include seven cultural, four natural, and one mixed site. The most recent addition was "Human Rights, Liberation and Reconciliation: Nelson Mandela Legacy Sites" in 2024.

=== Heritage designations ===
- List of heritage sites in South Africa
- National heritage sites of South Africa
- Provincial heritage site (South Africa)
- Heritage objects (South Africa)

== See also ==
- National Heritage Council
- National Monuments Council (South Africa and Namibia)
- Provincial heritage resources authority
  - Amafa aKwaZulu-Natali
  - Heritage Western Cape
  - Northern Cape Heritage Resources Authority
