= Amafa aKwaZulu-Natali =

South African government agency

Coordinates: 28°19′11″S 31°27′33″E

KwaZulu-Natal Amafa and Research Institute (Heritage KwaZulu-Natal)
- Abbreviation: KZN Amafa
- Formation: 2018
- Legal status: Public Entity
- Headquarters: KwaZulu Cultural Museum, King Cetshwayo Highway, Ondini, Ulundi
- Region served: KwaZulu-Natal Province, South Africa
- Head of Secretariat Administration: Dr Mxolisi Dlamuka
- Main organ: Council
- Website: amafainstitute.org.za

KwaZulu-Natal Amafa and Research Institute (Zulu for 'Heritage KwaZulu-Natal'), commonly known as 'Amafa', is a provincial heritage resources authority in terms of South Africa's National Heritage Resources Act. and is an agency of the Department of Sport, Arts and Culture KwaZulu-Natal Province of South Africa. It is also a 'public entity' under the terms of the Public Finance Management Act. It is mandated to care for that part of South Africa's national estate that is of provincial and local significance in KwaZulu-Natal.

Amafa is the oldest heritage resources authority in South Africa, all others being established in terms of the National Heritage Resources Act of 1999 or, in the Northern Cape, under provincial legislation that post dates the KwaZulu-Natal Heritage Act of 1997.

Amafa is best known as the custodian of approximately 300 provincial landmarks and heritage landmarks in the province, and several sites at which it manages interpretative centres.

== History ==
Amafa is the successor body to the National Monuments Council in the former Natal Province and KwaZulu Monuments Council in the former KwaZulu Bantustan or homeland, in South Africa. Under the 1996 Constitution of South Africa, cultural matters are a competency shared between national and provincial government. This necessitated the creation of a system whereby many of the responsibilities of former monuments authorities were devolved to the provincial level via the National Heritage Resources Act.

Provinces may pass their own heritage resources legislation. KwaZulu-Natal is one of only two that has chosen that route rather than using provisions of the National Heritage Resources Act to establish a provincial heritage resources authority (PHRA). Part of the reason for this is that the first KwaZulu-Natal Heritage Act (1997) predates the National Heritage Resources Act (1999) and that there was no national framework for heritage at the time that the province resolved to establish its PHRA. The 1997 Act was replaced in 2008 by a new act of the same name.

The logo of the organisation is the one formerly used by the KwaZulu Monuments Council.

=== Chairpersons of council ===
- 1997 – 2013: Mr Arthur Konigkramer
- 2013–Present Mr. J. Sithole

=== Chief executive officers ===
- 1997 – 2013: Mr Barry Marshall

== SAHRA and Amafa's mandate ==
Amafa is subject to a biennial assessment of competency by the South African Heritage Resources Agency, SAHRA in terms of the National Heritage Resources Act. This process determines which aspects of the national estate it is qualified to implement. It has been assessed as competent to deal with all areas over which a provincial heritage resources authority is permitted to act.

== Heritage resources for which Amafa is responsible ==
In terms of the KwaZulu-Natal Heritage Act Amafa is responsible for a range of heritage resources.

=== Specially protected sites ===
Amafa inherited responsibility for former national monuments and KwaZulu monuments in the province. These are now known as 'specially protected heritage resources' and are provincial landmarks, if state-owned, or heritage landmarks, if privately owned. These terms equate with the term provincial heritage site used by the National Heritage Resources Act and hence all other provincial heritage resources authorities in South Africa. At present there are around 300 such sites in the province .

Most specially protected sites must be declared by publication of a notice in the Provincial Gazette, but graves of members of the Zulu royal family, and battlefields and public monuments and memorials listed in the Schedule to the KwaZulu-Natal Heritage Act are automatically protected in the same way as a Heritage Landmark.

The organisation continues to declare new sites on a regular basis.

=== General protections ===
The following are protected without the need to be specifically identified and declared in terms of the Act.

- Structures older than 60 years
- Graves of victims of conflict
- Traditional burial places
- Battlefields
- Archaeological sites
- Palaeontological sites
- Rock art sites
- Historic fortifications
- Meteorites and meteorite impact sites

=== Heritage objects ===
Amafa may also protect moveable heritage as Heritage Objects by publication of a notice in the Provincial Gazette

=== Museums and interpretation centres ===
Amafa is unique amongst provincial heritage resources authorities in South Africa in that it also runs a museum and several interpretive centres at sites which it manages: .

- KwaZulu Cultural Museum, Ondini, Ulundi. The museum is the former museum of the KwaZulu Bantustan and illustrates the culture of the Zulu people. Ondini also includes the site of the capital of the Zulu King Cetshwayo kaMpande.
- Mgungundlovu, the site of the capital of Zulu King Dingane kaSenzangakhona.
- KwaDukuza, site of the assassination of Zulu King Shaka.
- Isandlwana Battlefield
- Rorkes Drift – Shiyane Battlefield
- Spioenkop Battlefield
- Border Cave Rock Shelter Stone Age site
- Kamberg Rock Art Centre

== Council and committees ==
Amafa is governed by a council appointed by members of the executive council of the province responsible for its functions. Presently that is the provincial Premier. It is appointed for a three-year term of office. .

The council has established a number of committees which meet regularly to implement the responsibilities of the organisation. These include the following: .

- Executive
- Human resources
- Museum
- Built environment
- Permit review committee for archaeology

== Staff complement ==
Amafa employs a staff complement of around 100. They are under the authority of the chief executive officer.

== Funding ==
Amafa receives an annual transfer payment from the KwaZulu-Natal premier's department. This, together with earnings from application fees and income generated by the sites which it manages, covers its operational costs.

== Offices ==
Amafa has offices at the KwaZulu Cultural Museum, King Cetshwayo Highway, Ondini, Ulundi (28.19.11.33S 31.27.33.75E) and the Old YMCA Building, Cnr Langalibalele and Buchanan Streets, Pietermaritzburg (29.36.16.46S 30.22.39.42.E)

== Literature ==
- KwaZulu-Natal Heritage Act (Act No. 10 of 1997)
- KwaZulu-Natal Heritage Act, Act No.4 of 2008, KwaZulu-Natal Provincial Gazette 225 of 12 February 2009
- http://www.dac.gov.za/acts/a25-99.pdf
- Annual Report – 2009-2010
- National Heritage Resources Act, Act 25 of 1999, Government Notice 506, Republic of South Africa Government Gazette, Vol. 406, No 19974, Cape Town, 28 April 1999
- List of heritage sites in KwaZulu-Natal

== See also ==
- Provincial heritage resources authority
- Provincial heritage site (South Africa)
- Heritage objects (South Africa)
- South African Heritage Resource Agency
- Heritage Western Cape
- Northern Cape Heritage Resources Authority
- National Monuments Council (South Africa and Namibia)
- Historical Monuments Commission
- List of heritage sites in KwaZulu-Natal
