= Heritage objects (South Africa) =

Heritage objects in South Africa are objects or collections formally declared as such by the South African Heritage Resource Agency in order to control their export. Declaration does not restrict the sale or ownership of the objects.

Archeological and paleontological material and meteorites are exempt from declaration as such objects may not be bought, sold or owned.

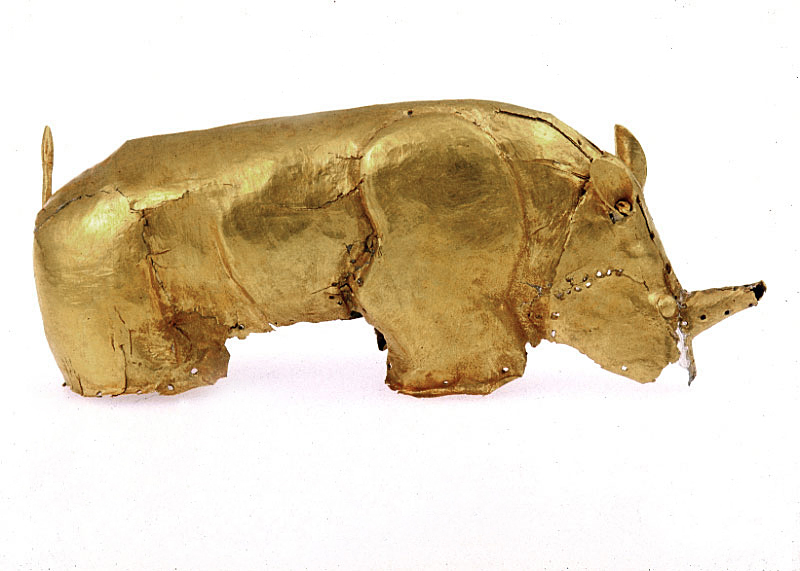
Golden Rhinoceros of Mapungubwe. SAHRA objects: MAP/G/2015/001

With the coming into effect of the National Heritage Resources Act on 1 April 2000, all moveable objects previously declared as national monuments became heritage objects.

== Heritage Objects at Provincial Level ==
At provincial level only Amafa aKwaZulu-Natali has powers to protect and manage heritage objects.

== See also ==
- National heritage sites (South Africa)
- Provincial heritage site (South Africa)
- South African Heritage Resources Agency
- Amafa aKwaZulu-Natali
- National Monuments Council (South Africa and Namibia)
