= Important Cultural Property =

Important Cultural Property may refer to:

- Important Cultural Property (Japan)
- Intangible Cultural Property (South Korea)
- Important Cultural Property (Philippines)

== See also ==
- Cultural property
- Hague Convention for the Protection of Cultural Property in the Event of Armed Conflict
