= Krešimir =

Krešimir (pronounced [krěʃimir]) is a Croatian masculine given name.

Notable people with the name used mononymously include:

- Krešimir I, King of Croatian Kingdom from 935 until his death in 945
- Michael Krešimir II (died 969), King of Croatia from 949 to his death in 969
- Krešimir III (died 1030), King of Croatia in 1000–1030 from the House of Trpimirović and founder of its cadet line House of Krešimirović
- Peter Krešimir IV (died 1075), King of Croatia from 1059 to his death

Notable people with the name include:

- Krešimir Baranović (1894–1975), Yugoslav composer and conductor
- Krešimir Bubalo (born 1973), Croatian politician of the HDSSB party, and Mayor of Osijek, his home city
- Krešimir Čač (born 1976), Croatian butterfly and medley swimmer
- Krešimir Ćosić (1948–1995), Croatian professional basketball player, member of FIBA Hall of Fame and Basketball Hall of Fame
- Krešimir Ćosić (politician) (born 1949), Croatian soldier and politician
- Krešimir Crnković (born 1995), Croatian biathlete and cross country skier
- Krešimir Čuljak (born 1970), Croatian rower, won a bronze medal in the eights competition at the 2000 Summer Olympics
- Krešimir Filić (1891–1972), Croatian historian and museologist
- Krešimir Kordić (born 1981), Bosnian football player, currently playing for ŠK Slovan Bratislava
- Krešimir Lončar (born 1983), Croatian professional basketball player
- Krešimir Makarin (born 1987), Croatian football player currently playing for Hajduk Split as a forward or a winger
- Krešimir Marušić (born 1969), Australian football player
- Krešimir Mišak (born 1972), Croatian journalist, rock musician and science fiction author
- Krešimir Rotim (born 1967), Croatian doctor and neurosurgeon
- Krešimir Stanić (born 1985), Swiss footballer of Croatian descent
- Krešimir Zubak (born 1947), Bosnian Croat politician

The most common hypocorism of the name Krešimir is Krešo. People with that name include:

- Krešo Beljak (born 1971), Croatian politician
- Krešo Golik (1922–1996), Croatian film and television director and screenwriter
- Krešo Kovačec (born 1969), German footballer
- Krešo Ljubičić (born 1988), Croatian footballer
- Krešo Omerzel (1957–2016), Slovenian speedway rider
- Krešo Pukšec (1920–1990), Croatian footballer
- Krešo Tretinjak (1905–1987), Yugoslav fencer
