= ICBS =

ICBS may mean:

- International Committee of the Blue Shield (ICBS), founded in 1996. In 2016 it merged with ANCBS to become The Blue Shield, the "Cultural Red Cross", working to protect the world's cultural heritage threatened by wars and natural disasters
- Imperial College Business School, a constituent faculty of Imperial College London
- Interoperable Communications Based Signaling, an initiative by railway systems
- Israel Central Bureau of Statistics
- Institute for Cognitive and Brain Sciences
- Integrated Computerized Banking System
