= Aarberg Castle =

- Schloss Aarberg (German)
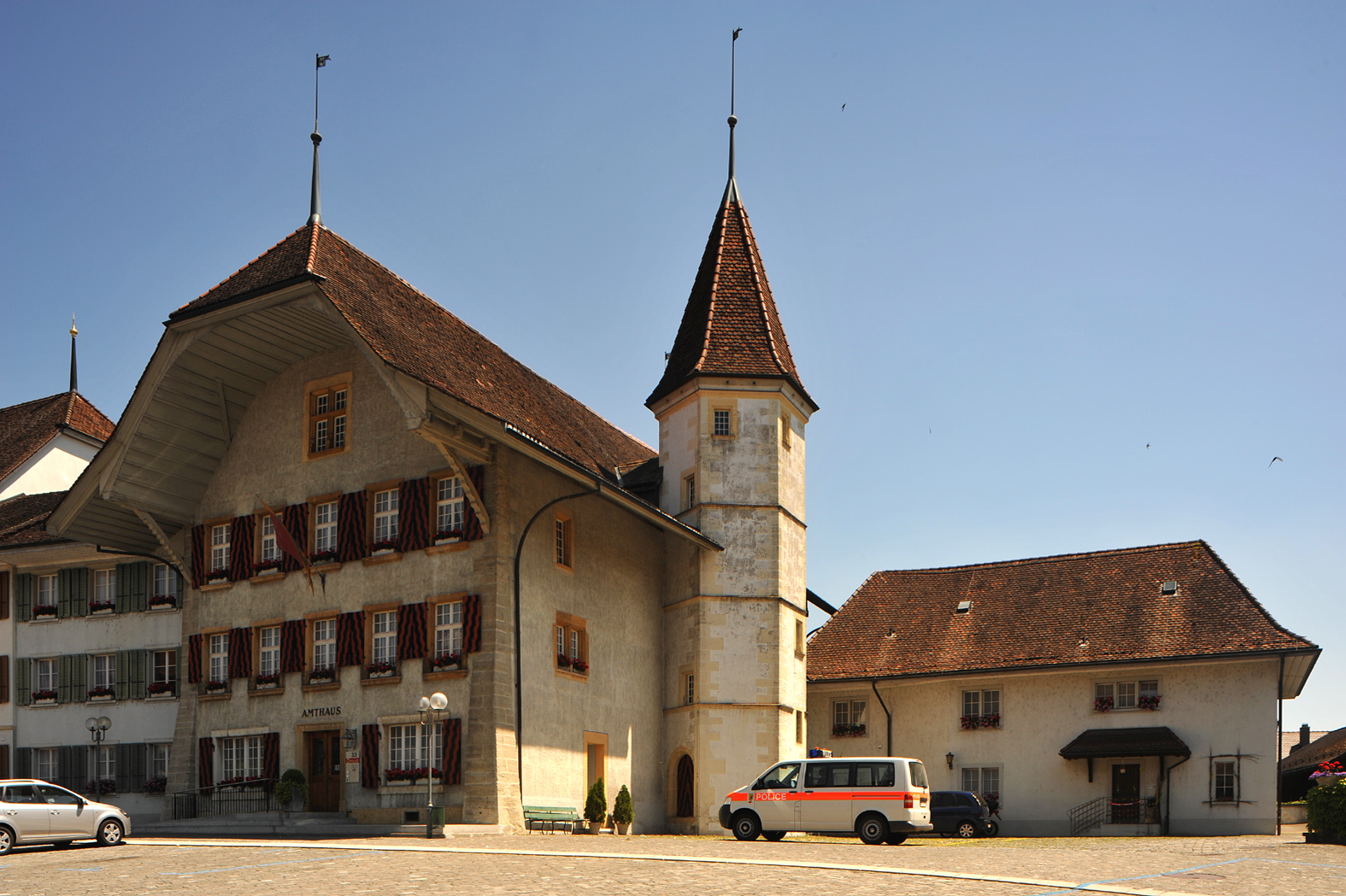

- Location within Canton of Bern Location within Switzerland
- 47°2′37.32″N 7°16′32.52″E
- Location: Aarberg

History
- Built: 13th century

Swiss Cultural Property of National Significance

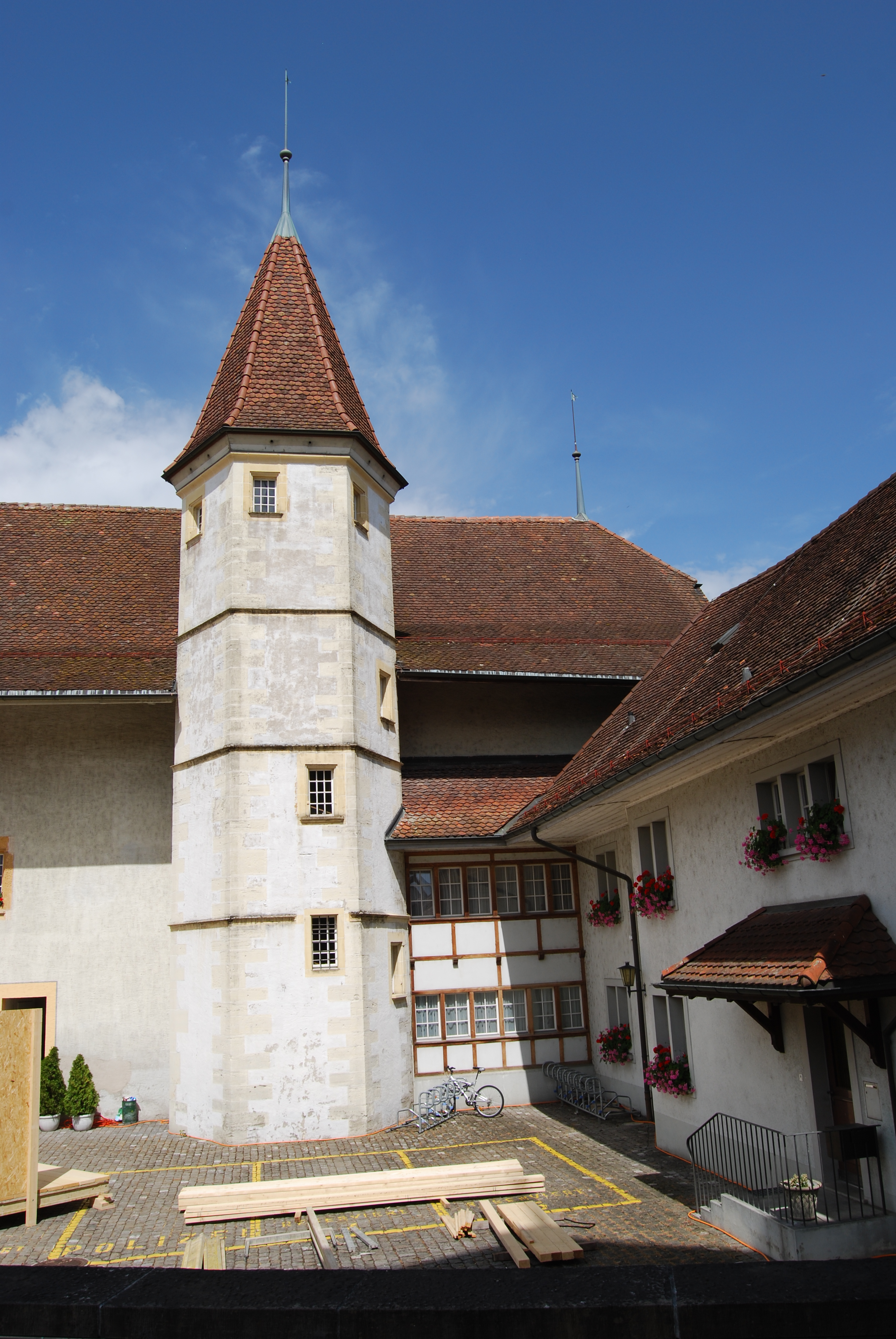
Castle tower

Aarberg Castle (German: Schloss Aarberg) is a castle in the municipality of Aarberg in the canton of Bern in Switzerland. It's a class B cultural property and part of the Swiss Inventory of Cultural Property of National and Regional Significance.

The original castle was built on the site around 1220 by Count Ulrich III of Neuchâtel to control the strategic bridge over the Aare. However, the town and castle were damaged by fires in 1419 and 1477. The current structure was constructed between 1608 and 1610 by the city of Bern to serve as the seat of the bailiff (*Landvogt*). Built in the Late Renaissance style, it was later remodeled in the 18th century.

Unlike many Swiss castles that operate as museums, Aarberg Castle functions today as the Amthaus (administrative office). It houses the Bernese Cantonal Police, the district prefecture (Regierungsstatthalteramt), and the child and adult protection authority.

== See also ==
- List of castles in Switzerland
