= Patrick Boylan =

English geologist and museum director (1939–2024)

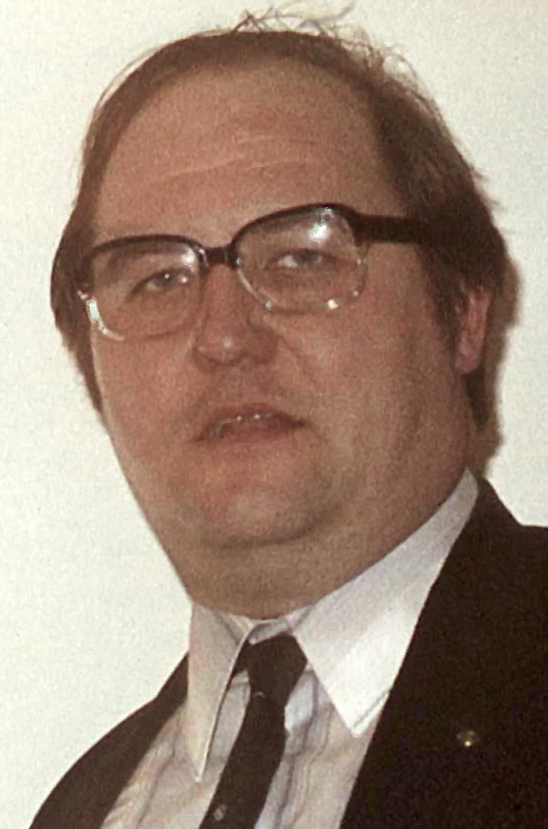
- Boylan in 1983
- Born: 17 August 1939; Hull, Yorkshire, England
- Died: 8 February 2024 (aged 84); Leicester, England
- Education: University of Hull (BSc and PGCE); University of Leicester (PhD)
- Occupations: Professor emeritus of heritage policy and management, City, University of London
- Notable work: Review of Convention on Protection of Cultural Property in the Event of Conflict (UNESCO) (author); Running a Museum: A Practical Handbook (editor); Museums 2000: Politics, People, Professionals and Profit (editor)
- Spouse(s): 1st: Ann Elizabeth née Worsfold (m. 1962); 2nd: Pamela Mary née Inder (m. 1993)
- Children: 4 sons by Ann All living ; 3 sons by Pamela all living
- Awards: FGS; FMA; FCMI; Order of Danica Hrvatska (Croatia)

Patrick John Boylan, FGS, FMA, FCMI (17 August 1939 – 8 February 2024) was an English geologist and museum director who was professor of heritage policy, and a leading international authority on museum policy and management. He first built up his experience of museum work at three English regional museums: in Kingston upon Hull, Exeter and Leicester.

== Early life and education ==
Born and brought up in Hull, Yorkshire, Boylan was the eldest son of Francis Boylan and Mary Doreen Boylan (née Haxby). His father was a master joiner in the town.

Boylan attended the Marist College, Hull, before enrolling at Hull University, where he earned a BSc in Geography and Geology in 1960, followed by a PGCE in 1961. He resumed his academic studies part time after a hiatus of some years and was awarded a PhD from the University of Leicester in 1985 in Geology and History of Science for his thesis on the life and work of Dean William Buckland (1784–1856), geologist and speleologist.

== Career ==
Although he embarked on a teaching career, serving from 1961 to 1963 as an assistant master at the Marist College, his old school in Hull, he then set off down a rather different career path in the museum world. In 1964, he became keeper of geology and natural history for Kingston upon Hull Museums. While working there he won with distinction the Museums Diploma awarded by the Museums Association (1966).

=== Royal Albert Memorial Museum and Art Gallery, Exeter ===
In 1968, aged 28, he was appointed director of the Royal Albert Memorial Museum and Art Gallery for Exeter City Council, retaining that position until 1972. One of the first exhibitions he mounted was a one-man show in August–September 1968 of the works of the illustrator and cartoonist George Adamson, who lived locally. In October 1969 he organised an exhibition to mark the centenary of the RAMM, which had opened to the public in 1869. At Boylan's instigation an archaeological unit was set up by Exeter City Council, leading to "a remarkably long history of archaeological excavation in the city".

=== Leicestershire museums, art galleries and records service ===
In 1972 he assumed the role of director of museums and art galleries for Leicester City Council, thus running eight museums, including the New Walk Museum and Art Gallery, Leicester, now Leicester Museum and Art Gallery, and two years later was elevated to the directorship of arts, museums and records for Leicestershire County Council.

Among many achievements at the New Walk Museum under Boylan's directorship was the loan exhibition German Impressionism and Expressionism from Leicester held at Thomas Agnew and Sons, London, from 12 November to 20 December 1985. The museum holds one of the foremost collections of German Expressionism in the United Kingdom.

While serving as museum director in Leicester, he put himself forward in 1987 for the post of director of the Victoria and Albert Museum in London as successor to Roy Strong, who was about to step down. Although Boylan was on the short list of external candidates, the directorship went to Elizabeth Esteve-Coll, one of the internal candidates.

=== City, University of London ===
His career then reverted to teaching, but now at tertiary level and in the realms of cultural heritage and preservation, when he was appointed professor of arts policy and management and later head of the department of cultural policy at the City, University of London, in 1990. There he remained until 2004.

=== Professorships ===
Boylan served briefly as visiting professor at University College London in 1995. From 1997 to 2002 he was visiting professor at the University of Buckingham; and for a short sojourn in Rio de Janeiro in 1998 at the Universidade Federal do Rio de Janeiro.

In 2004 he was appointed professor emeritus of heritage policy and management, City University, London.

=== Museums Association ===
For the Museums Association, the diploma of which he had earned in 1966, he served as councillor (1970–1 and 1986–92) and as Centenary President (1988–90).

=== International Council of Museums (ICOM) ===
For the International Council of Museums (ICOM), Boylan served in a panoply of roles: as chairman of the International Committee for Training of Personnel from 1983 to 1989 and from 1998 to 2004; as chairman of the UK National Committee (1987–93); as member of the Advisory Committee (1983–93); as chairman of the Ethics Committee (1984–90); as member of the Executive Committee (1989–92); as vice-president (1992–8); as chairman of the Legal Affairs Committee (2004–8); and in 2004, on reaching retirement age, became an honorary member.

=== UNESCO and other international institutions ===
Boylan served as consultant for UNESCO; for the UN/UNESCO World Committee on Culture and Development; for the Council of Europe; the World Bank; and the British Council among other institutions. He was also involved in providing training in cultural protection for United States special forces.

From 2005 to 2009 he was editor-in-chief of the International Journal of Intangible Heritage, and a member of its executive board from 2018 to 2021.

=== Geology, palaeontology and archaeology ===
Boylan held a lifelong interest in these fields. For the Hull Geological society he served as president from 1964 to 1967; for the Geological Society he was chairman of its library committee from 1984 to 1987; for the William Pengelly Cave Studies Trust (WPCST) in Devon, he was chairman (2007–15), then honorary president. For the Yorkshire Geological Society he was president (2012–14), then vice president (2015–17).

=== Local community support ===
For the Leicester Literary and Philosophical Society he was president in 1981–2; for the Leicestershire Archaeological and Historical Society he served as president from 2021. He also served as president of the Rotary Club of Leicester from 2009 to 2010, and in 2011 was awarded the Paul Harris medal by the club for services to the community.

Boylan was a member of the Royal Society of Arts.

== Personal life ==
In 1962 he wed Ann Elizabeth née Worsfold divorced 1986 and in 1993 he married his long term partner of 25 years during which time he had 3 children, Pamela Mary née Inder.

Boylan was passionate about music, especially choral and operatic. He was a member of the choir at Holy Cross, Leicester. He combined his love of music with that of research. He organised through the Rotary Club a musical event around his discovery of a Mrs Austin who became a successful singer in the United States: "Finding Leicester's Mrs Austin ... America’s First International Prima Donna", held at Leicester's Unitarian Chapel on 29 March 2019. The following year he published a learned article about the little-known Tudor composer Hugh Aston, some of whose work survived the almost complete destruction of manuscripts in the Catholic tradition during the English Reformation.

A lifelong interest in oenology was first aroused when he worked for a wine merchant while a student at Hull.

Boylan died on 8 February 2024, at the age of 84.

== Honours ==
- Order of Danica Hrvatska

In 1996, the Republic of Croatia bestowed on him the Order of Danica Hrvatska, a high-ranking medal awarded for cultural achievements.

With three others in 2012 he won the Advocate Award of the International Institute of Conservation for their exceptional work to establish and sustain the International Committee of the Blue Shield (ICBS).

In 2023 he was awarded the Moore medal by the Yorkshire Geological Society for services to geology. In the same year he was awarded the Felix Whitham medal of the Hull Geological Society.

=== Honorary positions ===
- Fellow of the Museums Association (awarded 1972)
- Fellow of the Geological Society (awarded 1973)
- Fellow of the British Institute of Management (now the Chartered Management Institute) (awarded 1990)
- Freeman, City of London (1991)
- Liveryman of the Worshipful Company of Framework Knitters (from 1991)

== Writings ==
His contribution to the study of museology and cultural preservation both tangible and intangible was substantial and, as outlined in the foreword to his UNESCO reassessment of the 1954 Hague Convention, his especial concern for cultural conservation began with his childhood memories of war-damaged Hull. About the convention itself his conclusion was: "The problem is essentially one of failure in the application of the Convention and Protocol rather than of inherent defects in the international instruments themselves."

== Bibliography ==
=== Books ===
- Boylan, Patrick J., with illustrations by Barbara J. Pyrah, Ice Age in Yorkshire and Humberside. York: Yorkshire Museum, 1977 No ISBN; LC : GB78-09533
- Boylan, Patrick J. (ed.): The Falconer Papers, Forres. Forres, Murrayshire: Falconer Museum, 1977 No ISBN LC : 82132841 //r93
- Boylan, Patrick J. (ed.): Treasures of the Exeter Museums: Royal Albert Memorial Museum Centenary. "Special Exhibition to Mark the Centenary of the Royal Albert Memorial Museum", 2–31 October 1969, exh. cat. Exeter: City of Exeter Museums and Art Gallery, 1969
- Boylan, Patrick J. (ed.): Towards a policy — for the Leicestershire Museums, Art Galleries & Records Service. Leicester: Leicestershire Museums, Art Galleries, and Records Service, 1977 ISBN 0850220661 OCLC 16559243
- Boylan, Patrick J. (contrib.): "The controversy of the Moulin-Quignon jaw: the role of Hugh Falconer," in Jordanova, Ludmilla J., and Porter, Roy S. (eds), Images of the Earth: Essays in the History of the Environmental Sciences. Chalfont St Giles, Buckinghamshire: British Society for the History of Science, 1979 ISBN 0906450004 OCLC 6082206
- Boylan, Patrick J., with Emmerson, Robin (contrib.), in Pegden, N. A., Leicester Guildhall: A Short History and Guide. Leicester: Leicestershire Museums, Art Galleries and Records Service, 1981 ISBN 0850220661 OCLC 16559243
- Boylan, Patrick J. (introduction), German Impressionism and Expressionism from Leicester: A Loan Exhibition, exhibition at Thomas Agnew & Sons, London, 12 November-20 December 1985. Exh. cat. London: Thomas Agnew & Sons, 1985 No ISBN OCLC 81930525
- Boylan, Patrick J., The Changing World of Museums and Art Galleries. Birmingham: University of Birmingham, Joint Centre for Regional Urban and Local Government Studies, 1986 ISBN 9780704408524 OCLC 315591831
- Boylan, Patrick J. (ed.), Museums 2000: Politics, People, Professionals and Profit, Proceedings of a Museums Association conference held in London, May 1989, celebrating the Association's centenary. London and New York: Museums Association in conjunction with Routledge, 1992 ISBN 9780415054553 OCLC 24374559 paperback ISBN 9780415071291
- Boylan, Patrick J., Review of Convention on Protection of Cultural Property in the Event of Armed Conflict (The Hague Convention of 1954). Paris: UNESCO, 1993 CLT.93/WS/12 (also transl. French) full text online.
- Boylan, Patrick J. (ed.) with Baghli, Sid Ahmed, and Herreman, Yani Histoire de l'ICOM, 1946–1996. Paris: Conseil international des musées (ICOM), 1998 ISBN 92-9012-243-9 OCLC 50803548. Book also available in English.
- Boylan, Patrick J., and Sarafopoulos, Jacqueline, Museums and Insurance: A Survey for the Museums & Galleries Commission. London: Museums & Galleries Commission, 1999 ISBN 0948630817 OCLC 50046937
- Boylan, Patrick J. (ed.): Running a Museum: A Practical Handbook. Paris: ICOM, 2004 (transl. Arabic, French, Spanish, Russian, Chinese, Vietnamese) ISBN 92-9012-157-2 OCLC 16559243 OCLC 700438803. Available online
- Boylan, Patrick J., and Woollard, A. V. R.: Trainer's Manual for Use with Running a Museum: A Practical Handbook, 2006 (transl. Arabic, French, Spanish, Chinese, Vietnamese) ISBN 92-9012-157-2
- Boylan, Patrick J. (contrib.): "The Museum Profession" in MacDonald, Sharon (ed.), A Companion to Museum Studies, Blackwell Companion to Museum Studies. Malden, Mass. and Oxford: Blackwell Publishing Ltd, 2006, pp. 415–30 ISBN 9781405108393
- Boylan, Patrick J. (ed.): Exchanging Ideas Dispassionately and without Animosity: The Leicester Literary and Philosophical Society 1835–2010. Leicester: Leicester Literary and Philosophical Society, 2010 ISBN 978-0956540003

See also a full list of his UNESCO titles: UNESCO publications

=== Essays and reviews ===
Boylan published some 200 articles and reviews. Many are available online at ResearchGate. Noteworthy among his writings are:

- "Didermocerus Brookes, 1828, v. Dicerorhinus Gloger, 1841 (Mammalia: Rhinocerotidae), and the validity of A Catalogue of the Anatomical and Zoological Museum of Joshua Brookes, 1828. Z.N. (S.) 1779", Bulletin of Zoological Nomenclature, 1967, vol. 24, pp. 55–6 online
- "Dean William Buckland, 1784–1856. A pioneer in cave science", Studies in Speleology, 1967 (published by the William Pengelly Cave Studies Trust), pp. 237–53
- "Museum training: a central concern of ICOM for forty years", Museum, 1987, vol. XXXIX, no. 44, pp. 225–30 online UNESDOC
- "L'ICOM a cinquante ans", Museum international, vol. 48, no. 3, January/December 1996, pp. 47–50 online, with access fee
- "William Buckland (1784–1856) and the foundations of taphonomy and palaeoecology" in Archives of Natural History, 1997, vol. 24, no. 3, pp. 361–72 See pdf of article.
- "The Identity of the Early Tudor Composer Hugh Aston, c. 1485–1558", Transactions of the Leicestershire Archaeological and Historical Society, 2020, vol. 94

Boylan was also a contributor to the Encyclopedia Britannica (Patrick Boylan as contributor)
