= National heritage site =

Cultural heritage site of national significance

Emblem of the International Committee of the Blue Shield that uses the protection logo of the Hague Convention of 1954

Emblem of the Roerich Pact of 1935

A national heritage site is a heritage site having a value that has been registered by a governmental agency as being of national importance to the cultural heritage or history of that country. Usually such sites are listed in a heritage register that is open to the public, and many are advertised by national visitor bureaus as tourist attractions.

Usually such a heritage register list is split by type of feature (natural wonder, ruin, engineering marvel, etc.). In many cases a country may maintain more than one register; there are also registers for entities that span more than one country.

== History of national heritage listing ==
Each country has its own national heritage list and naming conventions. Sites can be added to a list, and are occasionally removed and even destroyed for economic or other reasons. The concept of protecting and taking pride in cultural heritage is something that goes back to the Seven Wonders of the World, but usually it is only after destruction, especially mass destruction in times of war, that new lists are drawn up or revisited. Many countries acknowledge under UNESCO their designation of objects considered to be worthy of having importance to the entire world or world heritage. These listings also acknowledge the need for a separate list of objects judged part of their own unique cultural heritage. The concept of a national heritage site can be split into many types, each type having its own unique list.

Two major types of cultural heritage are "immoveable" and "moveable" objects. Immoveable objects are usually buildings and monuments, locations such as settlements and gardens or areas such as landscapes, reserves and city districts. Small moveable objects may include old books or artworks, large moveable objects may include automobiles, aircraft, trains and ships.

In the case of a national heritage site in a populated area, monitoring and protection may be under the jurisdiction of a fire department or local police department, whereas more remote sites may be under the protection of a central conservation agency.

=== Legal aspects ===
Most countries have passed laws to protect national heritage sites, with various classifications for owners. In Europe, many countries uphold the Venice Charter of 1964 though each country's name and criteria for protection, may change.

=== UNESCO World Heritage lists ===
The UNESCO keeps a list of heritage sites per country that are considered internationally important. These sites are almost always also on the national heritage register of the site's country.

== See also ==
- Cultural heritage
- List of heritage registers
