= Vera Fischer (sculptor) =

Croatian sculptor

- Born: 27 January 1925; Zagreb, Kingdom of Yugoslavia, (now Croatia)
- Died: 14 July 2009 (aged 84); Zagreb, Croatia
- Education: University of Zagreb
- Occupation: Sculptor

Vera Fischer (27 January 1925 – 14 July 2009) was a Croatian sculptor.

Fischer was born in Zagreb to a Jewish family on 27 January 1925. Her father died when she was one year old and she was raised by her grandparents, and mother Latica (née Klein). In 1951, Fischer graduated from the Academy of Fine Arts, at the University of Zagreb under professor Vanja Raduš. She has participated in the numerous solo and group exhibitions at home and abroad, such as the first public appearance in 1952 at the 8th Croatian Association of Artists exhibition, and in 1962 solo exhibition at the Croatian Association of Artists salon in Zagreb. In 2002, Fischer organized an autobiographical exhibition. Since 1952, Fischer was a member of the Croatian Association of Artists. In 1997, President of Croatia Franjo Tuđman awarded Fischer with the Order of Danica Hrvatska face of Marko Marulić. She was an active member of the Jewish community in Zagreb. Fischer died in Zagreb on 14 July 2009 and was buried at the Mirogoj Cemetery.

== Bibliography ==
- Snješka Knežević, Aleksander Laslo (2011). Židovski Zagreb. Zagreb: AGM, Židovska općina Zagreb. ISBN 978-953-174-393-8.
