= Order of Danica Hrvatska =

Order of Danica Hrvatska Red Danice hrvatske
- Type: State order
- Country: Republic of Croatia
- Presented by: the President of Croatia
- Eligibility: Croatian and foreign citizens
- Status: Active
- Established: 1 April 1995
- with the face of Marko Marulić with the face of Blaž Lorković Ribbon bars of the Order of Danica Hrvatska

Precedence
- Next (higher): Order of Stjepan Radić
- Next (lower): Order of the Croatian Cross

The Order of Danica Hrvatska (Croatian: Red Danice hrvatske, lit. 'Order of the Croatian Morning Star') is the fourteenth most important medal given by the Republic of Croatia. The order was founded on 1 April 1995. The medal is awarded for different purposes and with different faces:

- Marko Marulić – for culture
- Blaž Lorković – for business/economics
- Ruđer Bošković – for sciences
- Nikola Tesla – for innovation
- Franjo Bučar – for sports
- Katarina Zrinska – for health, social welfare and the promotion of moral values
- Antun Radić – for education

(left: Order medal; middle: smaller decorative version; right: Order ribbon)

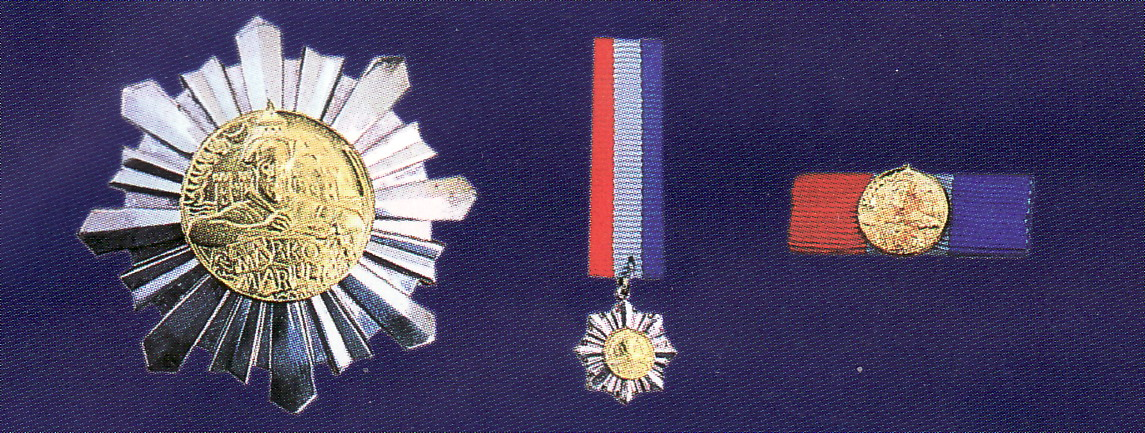
with the face of Marko Marulić

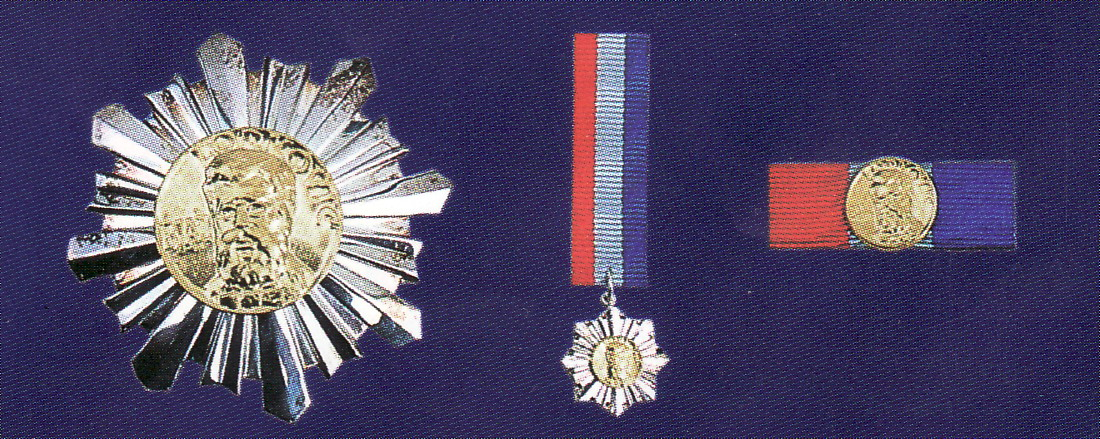
with the face of Blaž Lorković

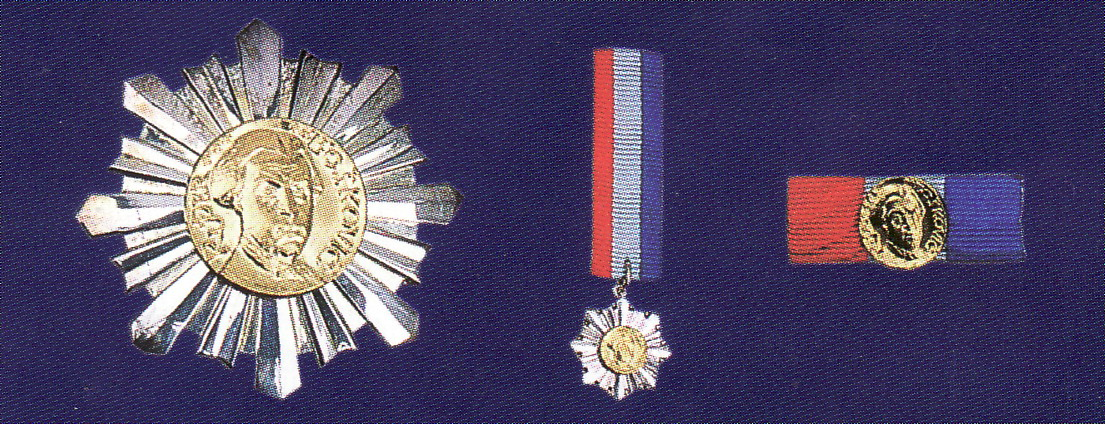
with the face of Ruđer Bošković

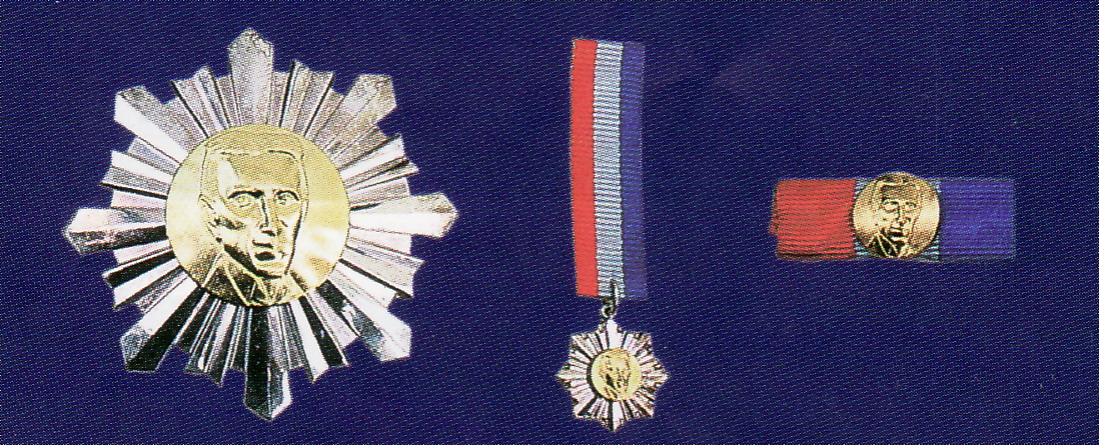
with the face of Nikola Tesla

with the face of Franjo Bučar

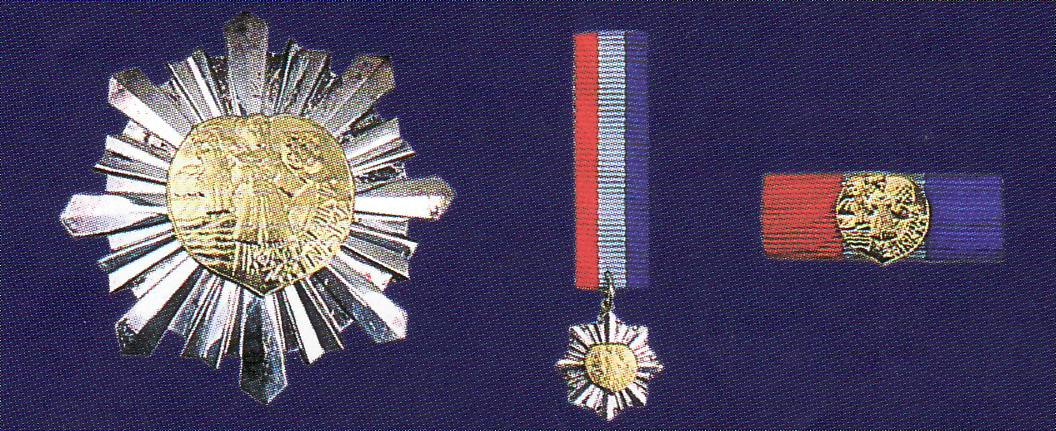
with the face of Katarina Zrinska

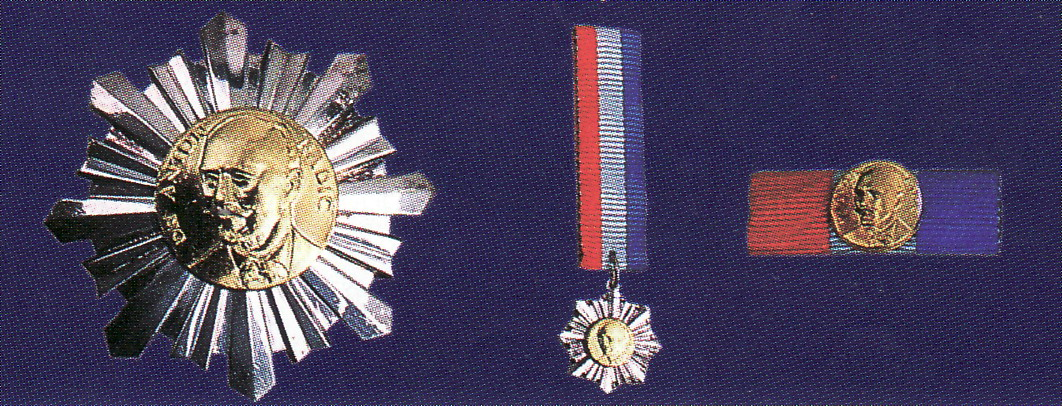
with the face of Antun Radić

== Notable recipients ==
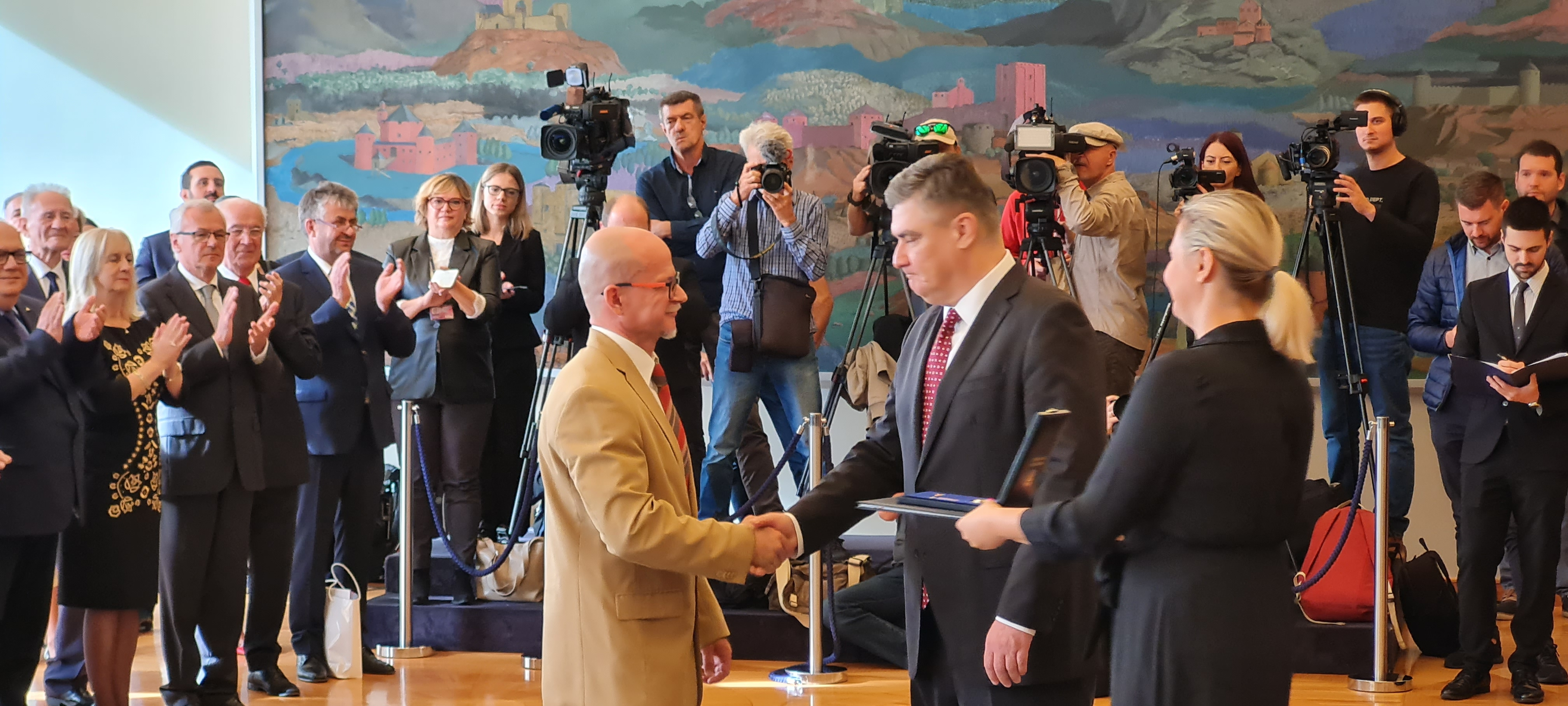
President of the Republic of Croatia Zoran Milanović is shaking hands with the painter Alfred F. Krupa on the occasion of awarding him with the Order of Danica Hrvatska with the image of Marko Marulić, October 25, 2023

- John Malkovich
- Mate Rimac
- Michael York OBE
- Martin Sheen
- Andrzej Wajda
- Vladimir Prelog ForMemRS
- Krzysztof Penderecki
- Alain Finkielkraut
- Francesca Thyssen-Bornemisza
- Philip J. Cohen
- Ivo Pogorelić
- Vera Fischer
- Davor Šuker
- Dražen Petrović
- Swami Maheshwarananda
- Bonaventura Duda
- Božo Biškupić
- Marin Čilić
- Alfred Freddy Krupa
- Patrick Boylan
- Krešimir Rotim
- Kažimir Hraste
