= Hague Convention for the Protection of Cultural Property in the Event of Armed Conflict =

International treaty

- The distinctive marking of cultural property under the Hague Convention (Blue Shield)
- Signed: 14 May 1954; 72 years ago
- Location: The Hague
- Effective: 7 August 1956; 70 years ago
- Signatories: unesdoc.unesco.org/..
- Parties: 138
- Depositary: Director-General of the United Nations Educational, Scientific and Cultural Organization
- Languages: English, French, Russian and Spanish
- Disclaimer: The distinctive emblem is a protective symbol used during armed conflicts and its use is restricted by international law

The Hague Convention for the Protection of Cultural Property in the Event of Armed Conflict is the first international treaty that focuses exclusively on the protection of cultural property in the event of armed conflict. It was signed at The Hague, Netherlands, on 14 May 1954 and entered into force on 7 August 1956. As of June 2025, it has been ratified by 138 States.

The provisions of the 1954 Hague Convention were supplemented and clarified by two Protocols concluded in 1954 and 1999. All three agreements are part of International Humanitarian Law, which, in the form of further agreements, primarily includes provisions defining the permissible means and methods of warfare and aiming at the widest possible protection of persons not involved in the fighting. In contrast to these parts of International Humanitarian Law, the agreements on the protection of cultural property were drawn up under the auspices of the United Nations (UN); the United Nations Educational, Scientific and Cultural Organization (UNESCO) is primarily responsible for the dissemination and monitoring of compliance. In addition to rules designed to ensure the protection and respect of cultural property during an armed conflict, these agreements also provide for security measures to be implemented in times of peace.

Blue Shield International, based in The Hague, is active in the field of international coordination with regard to military and civil structures for the protection of cultural assets.

The guiding principles of the convention and the motivation for its conclusion, dissemination and respect are summarised in the preamble, which states, among other things:

... that any damage to cultural property, irrespective of the people it belongs to, is a damage to the cultural heritage of all humanity, because every people contributes to the world's culture ...

== States Parties ==
Party to the treaty / Signed but did not ratify

As of August 2026, 138 States are Parties to the treaty and there are 115 States Parties to the First Protocol, while the Second Protocol has 94 States Parties.

== Cultural property ==
For the purposes of the present Convention, the term 'cultural property' shall cover, irrespective of origin or ownership:

(a) movable or immovable property of great importance to the cultural heritage of every people, such as monuments of architecture, art or history, whether religious or secular; archaeological sites; groups of buildings which, as a whole, are of historical or artistic interest; works of art; manuscripts, books and other objects of artistic, historical or archaeological interest; as well as scientific collections and important collections of books or archives or of reproductions of the property defined above;

(b) buildings whose main and effective purpose is to preserve or exhibit the movable cultural property defined in sub-paragraph (a) such as museums, large libraries and depositories of archives, and refuges intended to shelter, in the event of armed conflict, the movable cultural property defined in sub-paragraph (a);

(c) centers containing a large amount of cultural property as defined in sub-paragraphs (a) and (b), to be known as 'centers containing monuments'.

Cultural property is the manifestation and expression of the cultural heritage of a group of people or a society. It is an expression of the ways of living developed by a community and passed on from generation to generation, including the customs of a people, their practices, places, objects, artistic endeavours and values. The protection of cultural property during times of armed conflict or occupation is of great importance, because such property reflects the life, history and identity of communities; its preservation helps to rebuild communities, re-establish identities, and link people's past with their present and future.

== History ==
=== Preceding conventions ===
The Hague Conventions of 1899 and 1907 preceded the Hague Convention of 1954. The multilateral agreement of 1899 and the slightly amended later version of 1907 contained in Article 27 the commandment for the attacking party to spare historical monuments, educational institutions and institutions of religious, not-for-profit, artistic or scientific significance as far as possible during sieges and bombardments. The party under attack is called upon to mark appropriate buildings. Article 56 also contained a general ban on the confiscation, destruction or damage of such facilities. However, during the First World War, acceptance of these first Hague Conventions was severely restricted by the so-called all-participation clause. It stated that, in the event of war or armed conflict, this Agreement should apply only if all States involved in that conflict are parties to the convention.

The Russian lawyer, painter and writer Nicholas Roerich, who witnessed the destruction of cultural assets in Russia during the First World War and the October Revolution, initiated the development of an independent treaty at the beginning of the 1930s to protect cultural assets during armed conflicts. On his initiative, Georges Chklaver of the Institute for Higher International Studies at the University of Paris drew up a corresponding draft in 1929. This proposal was subsequently discussed by the International Museum Office of the League of Nations and at private conferences in Bruges in 1931 and 1932 and in Washington, D.C. in 1933. The seventh international conference of American states, which took place in Buenos Aires in 1933, recommended the adoption of the draft. The Board of the Pan-American Union subsequently presented a treaty "on the protection of artistic and scientific institutions and historical monuments", which was signed on 15 April 1935 in the White House by 21 states in North, Central and South America. Ten of the signatory states also became parties by ratification, the first of which was the United States on 13 July 1935 and the last of which was Colombia on 20 February 1937. The agreement, also known as the Roerich Pact after its initiator, entered into force on 26 August 1935.

The Roerich Pact contained eight articles and several significant innovations compared with the general provisions of Articles 27 and 56 of the Hague Conventions of 1899 and 1907. On the one hand, the treaty established the status of neutrality for historical monuments, museums, scientific and artistic institutions as well as educational and cultural institutions. This legal position, comparable to the neutrality of medical personnel and comparable institutions during a war, resulted in respect for these goods by all parties involved in a conflict and thus their protection. The Parties should send lists of monuments and sites for which they claimed protection under the Treaty to the Pan-American Union, which should forward them to all States Parties.

The Banner of Peace – the emblem of protection of the Roerich Pact

In addition, the Treaty defined a protection mark for the marking of cultural objects, consisting of three red dots in a red circle on a white background. Nicholas Roerich, who designed it with early symbolism in mind, described the significance of the three points as a symbol of art, science and religion as the three most important cultural activities of humanity, with the circle as the element that linked these three aspects in the past, present and future. The symbol was also called the "Banner of Peace", the movement based on the Roerich Pact under the name Pax Cultura in analogy to the Geneva Conventions as the "Red Cross of Culture".

However, the acceptance of the Roerich Pact was limited to the United States and the countries of Central and South America. Not a single country in Europe and Asia, the geopolitical focus of the Second World War that began a few years later, signed or ratified the treaty. Even though it remains valid in relations between the parties and the Organization of American States (OAS) and continues to act as a depositary in succession to the Pan-American Union, the Roerich Pact remained without significant practical relevance. As the USA is not party to the 1999 Second Protocol of the Hague Convention, the Roerich Pact is therefore still of importance as a contractual obligation in the area of cultural property protection. Nevertheless, with the establishment of a protective label and the administration of lists of cultural assets worthy of protection by a central international institution, this treaty introduced two important far-reaching principles in the area of the protection of cultural assets in armed conflicts that remain important today.

Only four years after the Roerich Pact was signed, the government of the Netherlands presented a draft for a new convention, in the drafting of which the International Museum Office of the League of Nations was also significantly involved. However, the start of the Second World War in the same year prevented all further steps to develop and implement this proposal. After the end of the war, in 1948 the Netherlands again submitted a proposal to UNESCO, which had been founded three years earlier. In 1951, the General Conference of UNESCO decided to set up a committee of governmental experts to draft a new convention. A year later, this committee submitted a draft to the General Conference, which forwarded it to the national governments for further discussion. From 21 April to 14 May 1954, an international conference was held in The Hague with the participation of 56 states, which drew up a final version and adopted it as the "Hague Convention for the Protection of Cultural Property in the Event of Armed Conflict". The agreement entered into force on 7 August 1956. After the 1948 Genocide Convention on the Prevention and Punishment of the Crime of Genocide, this was the second important agreement in the field of international humanitarian law to which the United Nations played a major role in its creation and implementation.

=== Destruction of cultural property in World War II ===
==== The Nazis and "degenerate art" ====
Jean Metzinger's En Canot (Im Boot) was one of many works classified as degenerate art and confiscated by the Nazis.

The Nazi Party headed by Adolf Hitler rose to power in Germany in 1933 after the country's crippling defeat, and its socioeconomic distress during the years following World War I. World War II was aimed at reclaiming the glory of the once great Germanic state. Cultural property of many European nations and significant ethnic and social groups within them fell victim to Nazi Germany. The Nazi party, through the Third Reich, confiscated close to 20% of all Western European art during the war. By the end of the Second World War, the Nazi party had looted and collected thousands of objects, art works and artefacts from occupied nations, destroyed many, or stored them in secret.

With artists depicting the hardship of the German people after World War I, and further expressing the fear of anti-Semitism and fascism, the Nazi party and Hitler himself soon realised the dangerous power of art, and began to clamp down on artistic production and forcing both artists and the public alike to adhere to a Nazi-approved style.

Inherent within the Nazi's ideology was the idea of supremacy of the Aryan Race and all that it produced; as such the Nazi campaign's aims were to neutralize non-Germanic cultures and this was done through the destruction of culturally significant art and artefacts. This is illustrated greatest in the Jewish communities throughout Europe; by devising a series of laws that allowed them to justify and regulate the legal confiscation of cultural and personal property. Within Germany the looting of German Jewish cultural property began with the confiscation of non-Germanic artwork in the German state collection. Further, artists that were Jewish and artworks that did not match the Nazi ideology, or posed a threat to it, were stamped as degenerate art. Degenerate works of art, culminating in the infamous exhibition with the same name, were those whose subject, artist, or art was either Jewish or expressed Anti-Nazi sentiments, and was as such offensive to the Third Reich.

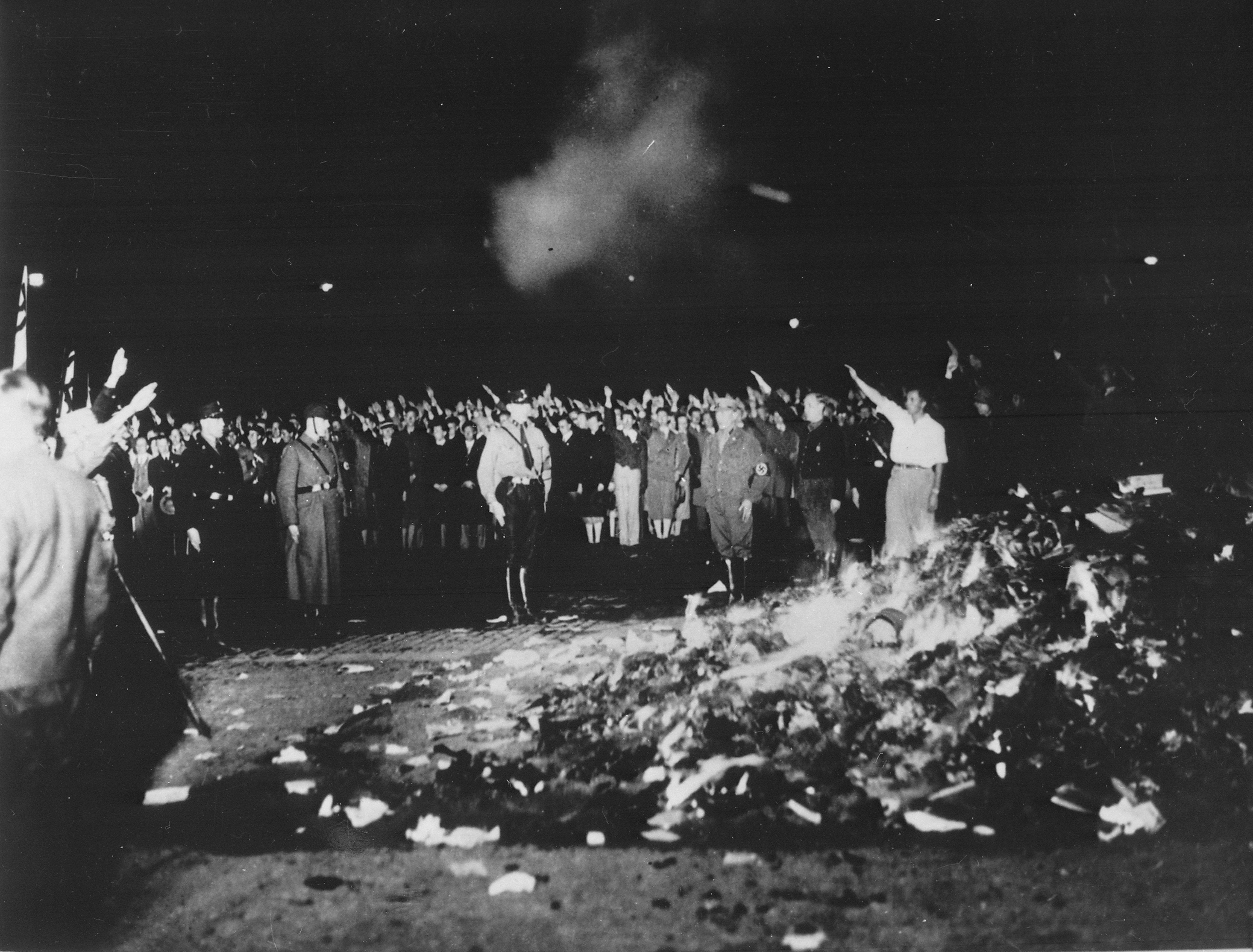
Nazi book burnings

Jewish collections were looted the most throughout the war. German Jews were ordered to report their personal assets, which were then privatized by the country. Jewish owned art galleries were forced to sell the works of art they housed. The Nazis concentrated their efforts on ensuring that all art within Germany would be Aryan in nature, speaking to the might of the Germanic state rather than Jewish art which was deemed as a blight on society. In a feat to "purge" German museums and collections, confiscation committees seized approximately 16,000 items within Germany. The remaining unexploited art was destroyed in massive bonfires. As the war progressed, the Nazi party elite ordered the confiscation of cultural property throughout various European countries.

==== Nazi plunder in Eastern Europe ====
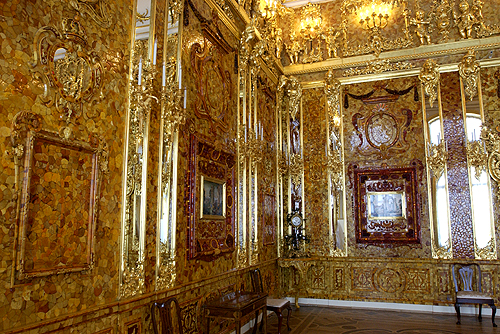
Modern Day Amber Room

In the Soviet Union, Nazi plunder of cultural significant art is best illustrated in the Third Reich's pillage of the Catherine Palace near St Petersburg and its famous Amber Room dating to the early 1700s. In October 1941, the Nazis had occupied the western portion of the Soviet Union, and began removing art treasures to the west. The entirety of the Amber Room was removed to Königsberg and reconstructed there. In January 1945, with the Russian army advancing on the city, the Amber Room was ordered to be moved again but its fate is thereafter unclear. A post-war Russian report concluded that 'summarizing all the facts, we can say that the Amber Room was destroyed between 9 and 11 April 1945' during the battle to take the city. However, in the absence of definitive proof, other theories about its fate continue to be entertained to the present day. With financial assistance from German donors, Russian craftsmen reconstructed a new Amber Room during the 1990s. The new room was dedicated by Russian president Vladimir Putin and German chancellor Gerhard Schröder at the 300th anniversary of the city of Saint Petersburg.

=== After World War II ===
With the conclusion of the Second World War and the subsequent defeat of the Axis powers, the atrocities which the Nazi leadership condoned, leading to the removal of culturally significant items and the destruction of numerous others could not be allowed to occur in future generations. This led the victorious Allied forces to create provisions to ensure safeguards for culturally significant items in times of war. As a result, following the signature of the Roerich Pact by the American States in 1935, attempts were undertaken to draft a more comprehensive convention for the protection of monuments and works of art in time of war. In 1939, a draft convention, elaborated under the auspices of the International Museums Office, was presented to governments by the Netherlands. Due to the onset of the Second World War the draft convention was shelved with no further steps being taken. With the conclusion of the war, a new proposal was submitted to UNESCO by the Netherlands in 1948. The General Conference of UNESCO in 1951 decided to convene a committee of government experts to draft a convention. This committee met in 1952 and thereafter submitted its drafts to the General Conference. The intergovernmental Conference, which drew up and adopted the convention and the further Acts, took place at The Hague from 21 April to 14 May 1954 where 56 States were represented. Following this international agreement The Hague Convention For the Protection of Cultural Property in the Event of Armed Conflict would come into force in 1956 in order to be an instrument of non derogation for the states bound by the document to stop the looting and destruction of cultural property.

== The Hague Convention ==
The Hague Convention outlines various prohibitions and obligations which States Parties are expected to observe, both in peacetime and in times of conflict.

Broadly, the Hague Convention requires that States Parties adopt protection measures during peacetime for the safeguarding of cultural property. Such measures include the preparation of inventories, preparation for the removal of movable cultural property and the designation of competent authorities responsible for the safeguarding of cultural property.

States Parties undertake to respect cultural property, not only located within their own territory, but also within the territory of other States Parties, during times of conflict and occupation. In doing so, they agree to refrain from using cultural property and its immediate surroundings for purposes likely to expose it to destruction or damage in the event of armed conflict. States Parties also agree to refrain from any act of hostility directed against such property.

The convention also requires the establishment of special units within national military forces, to be charged with responsibility for the protection of cultural property. Furthermore, States Parties are required to implement criminal sanctions for breaches of the convention, and to undertake promotion of the convention to the general public, cultural heritage professionals, the military and law-enforcement agencies.

An example of the successful implementation of the Hague Convention was the Gulf War, in which many members of the coalition forces (who were either party to the convention or who, in the instance of the US, were not party to the convention) accepted the convention's rules, most notably by creating a "no-fire target list" of places where cultural property was known to exist.

=== Safeguarding cultural property ===
The obligation of States Parties to safeguard cultural property in peacetime is outlined in Article 3. It stipulates:

'The High Contracting Parties undertake to prepare in time of peace for the safeguarding of cultural property situated within their own territory against the foreseeable effects of an armed conflict, by taking such measures, as they consider appropriate.'

=== Respect for cultural property ===
The Hague Convention sets out a minimum level of respect which all States Parties must observe, both in relation to their own national heritage as well as the heritage of other States Parties. States are obliged not to attack cultural property, nor to remove or misappropriate movable property from its territory of origin. Only exceptional cases of 'military necessity' will excuse derogation from this obligation. However, a State Party is not entitled to ignore the convention's rules by reason of another Party's failure to implement safeguarding measures alone.

This is set out in Article 4 of the Hague Convention:

Article 4:

(1) The High Contracting Parties undertake to respect cultural property situated within their own territory as well as within the territory of other High Contracting Parties by refraining from any use of the property and its immediate surroundings or of the appliances in use for its protection for purposes which are likely to expose it to destruction or damage in the event of armed conflict; and by refraining from any act of hostility directed against such property.

(2) The obligations mentioned in paragraph I of the present Article may be waived only in cases where military necessity imperatively requires such a waiver.

(3) The High Contracting Parties further undertake to prohibit, prevent and, if necessary, put a stop to any form of theft, pillage or misappropriation of, and any acts of vandalism directed against, cultural property. They shall, refrain from requisitioning movable cultural property situated in the territory of another High Contracting Party.

(4) They shall refrain from any act directed by way of reprisals against cultural property.

(5) No High Contracting Party may evade the obligations incumbent upon it under the present Article, in respect of another High Contracting Party, by reason of the fact that the latter has not applied the measures of safeguard referred to in Article 3.'

=== Occupation ===
The rules set out in the Hague Convention also apply to States who are Occupying Powers of territory during conflict or otherwise. The Convention obliges Occupying Powers to respect the cultural property of the occupied territory, and to support local national authorities in its preservation and repair when necessary. This obligation is articulated in Article 5:

Article 5:

(1) Any High Contracting Party in occupation of the whole or part of the territory of another High Contracting Party shall as far as possible support the competent national authorities of the occupied country in safeguarding and preserving its cultural property.

(2) Should it prove necessary to take measures to preserve cultural property situated in occupied territory and damaged by military operations, and should the competent national authorities be unable to take such measures, the Occupying Power shall, as far as possible, and in close co-operation with such authorities, take the most necessary measures of preservation.

(3) Any High Contracting Party whose government is considered their legitimate government by members of a resistance movement, shall, if possible, draw their attention to the obligation to comply with those provisions of the Conventions dealing with respect for cultural property.

=== Special protection ===
The Hague Convention establishes a 'special protection' regime, which obliges States Parties to ensure the immunity of cultural property under special protection from acts of hostility (Articles 8 and 9). Under Article 8, this protection may be granted to one of three categories of cultural property: (1) refuges intended to shelter movable cultural property in the event of armed conflict; (2) centers containing monuments; and (3) other immovable cultural property of very great importance. To receive special protection, cultural property must also be located an adequate distance from an industrial center or location which would render it vulnerable to attack, and must not be used for military purposes.

== First Protocol to the Hague Convention ==
The First Protocol was adopted at the same time as the Hague Convention, on 14 May 1954. It specifically applies to movable cultural property only, and prohibits the export of movable property from occupied territory and also requires its return to its original territory at the conclusion of hostilities (Article 1). States Parties under the obligation to prevent the export of such property may be required to pay an indemnity to States whose property was removed during hostilities.

== Second Protocol to the Hague Convention ==
Criminal acts committed against cultural property in the late 1980s and the beginning of the 1990s highlighted the deficiencies in the implementation of the Hague Convention and its First Protocol. As a result of the 'Boylan review' (a review of the Convention led by Professor Patrick Boylan), the Second Protocol to the Hague Convention was adopted at a diplomatic conference held at The Hague in March 1999. The Second Protocol seeks complement and expand upon the provisions of the Hague Convention, by including developments in international humanitarian law and cultural property protection which had emerged since 1954. It builds on the provisions contained in the Convention relating to the safeguarding of and respect for cultural property, as well as the conduct of hostilities; thereby providing greater protection for cultural property than that conferred by the Hague Convention and its First Protocol.

=== Enhanced protection ===
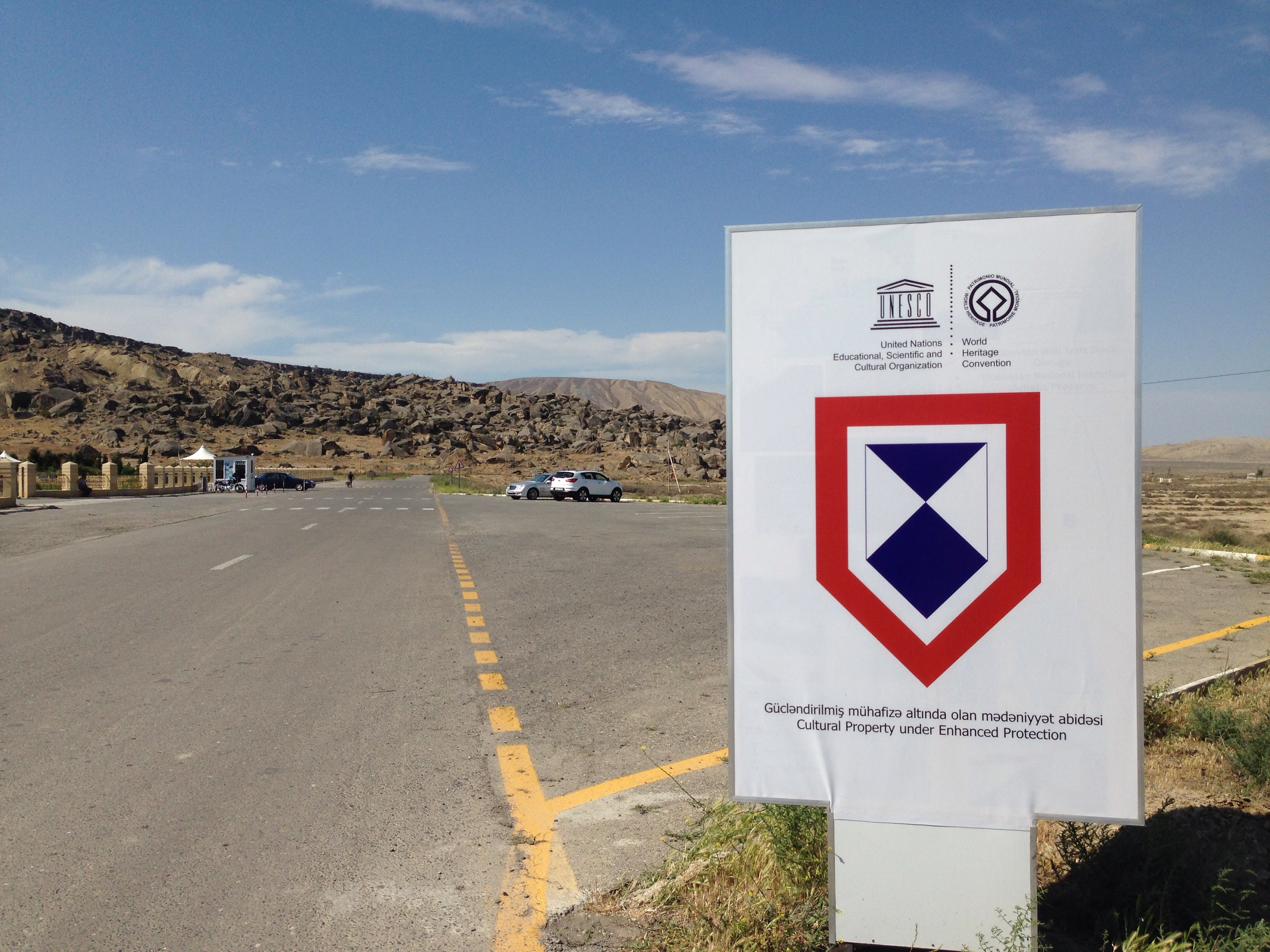
The enhanced protection emblem displayed at the Gobustan Archaeological site in Azerbaijan

One of the most important features of the Second Protocol is the 'enhanced protection' regime it establishes. This new category of cultural property is outlined in Chapter Three of the Second Protocol. Enhanced protection status means that the relevant cultural property must remain immune from military attack, once it is inscribed on the International List of Cultural Property Under Enhanced Protection. While the 1954 Hague Convention requires States not to make any cultural property the object of attack except for cases of 'military necessity', the Second Protocol stipulates that cultural property under enhanced protection must not be made a military target, even if it has (by its use) become a 'military objective'. An attack against cultural property which enjoys enhanced protection status is only excusable if such an attack is the 'only feasible means of terminating the use of property [in that way]' (Article 13).

To be granted enhanced protection, the cultural property in question must satisfy the three criteria stipulated in Article 10 of the Second Protocol. The three conditions are:

1. it is cultural heritage of the greatest importance for humanity;
2. it is protected by adequate domestic legal and administrative measures recognising its exceptional cultural and historic value and ensuring the highest level of protection; and
3. it is not used for military purposes or to shield military sites and a declaration has been made by the Party which has control over the cultural property, confirming that it will not be so used.

Currently there are 161 cultural properties from 18 States Parties inscribed on the Enhanced Protection List. These include sites in Armenia, Brazil, Azerbaijan, Belgium, Burkina Faso, Cambodia, Cyprus, Czech Republic, Estonia, Georgia, Italy, Lebanon, Lithuania, Mali, Mexico, State of Palestine, Ukraine and Yemen.

=== The Committee for the Protection of Cultural Property in the Event of Armed Conflict ===
Article 24 of the Second Protocol establishes a 12-member Committee for the Protection of Cultural Property in the Event of Armed Conflict. Its members are elected for a term of four years, and an equitable geographic representation is taken into account at the election of its members. The Committee meets once a year in ordinary session, and in extraordinary sessions if and when it deems necessary.

The committee is responsible for the granting, suspension and cancellation of enhanced protection to cultural properties nominated by States Parties. It also receives and considers requests for international assistance which are submitted by States, as well as determining the use of the Fund for the Protection of Cultural Property in the Event of Armed Conflict. Under Article 27 of the Second Protocol, the committee also has a mandate to develop Guidelines for the implementation of the Second Protocol.

=== The Fund for the Protection of Cultural Property in the Event of Armed Conflict ===
Article 29 of the Second Protocol establishes the Fund for the Protection of Cultural Property in the Event of Armed Conflict. Its purpose is to provide financial or other assistance for 'preparatory or other measures to be taken in peacetime'. It also provides financial or other assistance in relation to 'emergency, provisional or other measures to protect cultural property during periods of armed conflict', or for recovery at the end of hostilities. The Fund consists of voluntary contributions from States Parties to the Second Protocol. In 2016, the sums of US$50,000 and US$40,000 were provided to Libya and Mali respectively from the Fund, in response to their requests for assistance in the installation of emergency and safeguarding measures.

=== Sanctions and individual criminal responsibility ===
Chapter Four of the Second Protocol specifies sanctions to be imposed for serious violations against cultural property, and defines the conditions in which individual criminal responsibility should apply. This reflects an increased effort to fight impunity through effective criminal prosecution since the adoption of the Hague Convention in 1954. The Second Protocol defines five 'serious violations' for which it establishes individual criminal responsibility (Article 15):

1. making cultural property under enhanced protection the object of attack;
2. using cultural property under enhanced protection or its immediate surroundings in support of military action;
3. extensive destruction or appropriation of cultural property protected under the Convention and this Protocol;
4. making cultural property protected under the Convention and this Protocol the object of attack; and
5. theft, pillage or misappropriation of, or acts of vandalism directed against cultural property protected under the convention.

States are obligated to adopt appropriate legislation to make these violations criminal offences under their domestic legislation, to stipulate appropriate penalties for these offences, and to establish jurisdiction over these offences (including universal jurisdiction for three of the five serious violations, as set out in Article 16(1)(c)).

An example of prosecution for crimes against cultural property is The Prosecutor v Ahmad Al Faqi Al Mahdi case, handed down by the International Criminal Court on 27 September 2016. Al Mahdi was charged with and pleaded guilty to the war crime of intentionally directing attacks against historic monuments and buildings dedicated to religion, and sentenced to nine years' imprisonment. Al Mahdi was a member of the Ansar Eddine group (a group associated with Al Qaeda), and a co-perpetrator of damaging and destroying nine mausoleums and one mosque in Timbuktu, Mali, in 2012.

=== Military Manual ===
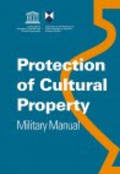
Military Manual on the Protection of Cultural Property

In 2016 UNESCO, in collaboration with the Sanremo International Institute of Humanitarian Law, published a manual titled 'Protection of Cultural Property: Military Manual'. This manual outlines the rules and obligations contained in the Second Protocol, and provides practical guidance on how these rules should be implemented by military forces around the world. It also contains suggestions as to best military practices in relation to these obligations. It relates only to the international laws governing armed conflict, and does not discuss military assistance that is provided in connection with other circumstances such as natural disasters.

== Implementation of the Convention ==
=== Punishment for infringements ===
The Rome Statute, adopted in July 1998 and entering into force four years later, as the legal basis of the International Criminal Court (ICC), defines in Article 8(2) deliberate attacks against buildings of a religious, educational, artistic, scientific or non-profit nature and against historical monuments as war crimes in both international and non-international armed conflicts. The International Criminal Court is thus authorised to prosecute such crimes if such an act was committed either by a national of a Contracting Party or on the territory of a Contracting Party. However, it only exercises its competence if the country concerned is unwilling or unable to ensure effective prosecution itself. Since September 2015, Ahmad Al Faqi Al Mahdi has been charged with the destruction of mausoleums in Timbuktu in the first trial before the ICC over the destruction of cultural assets.

=== Siege of Dubrovnik and the Mostar Bridge ===
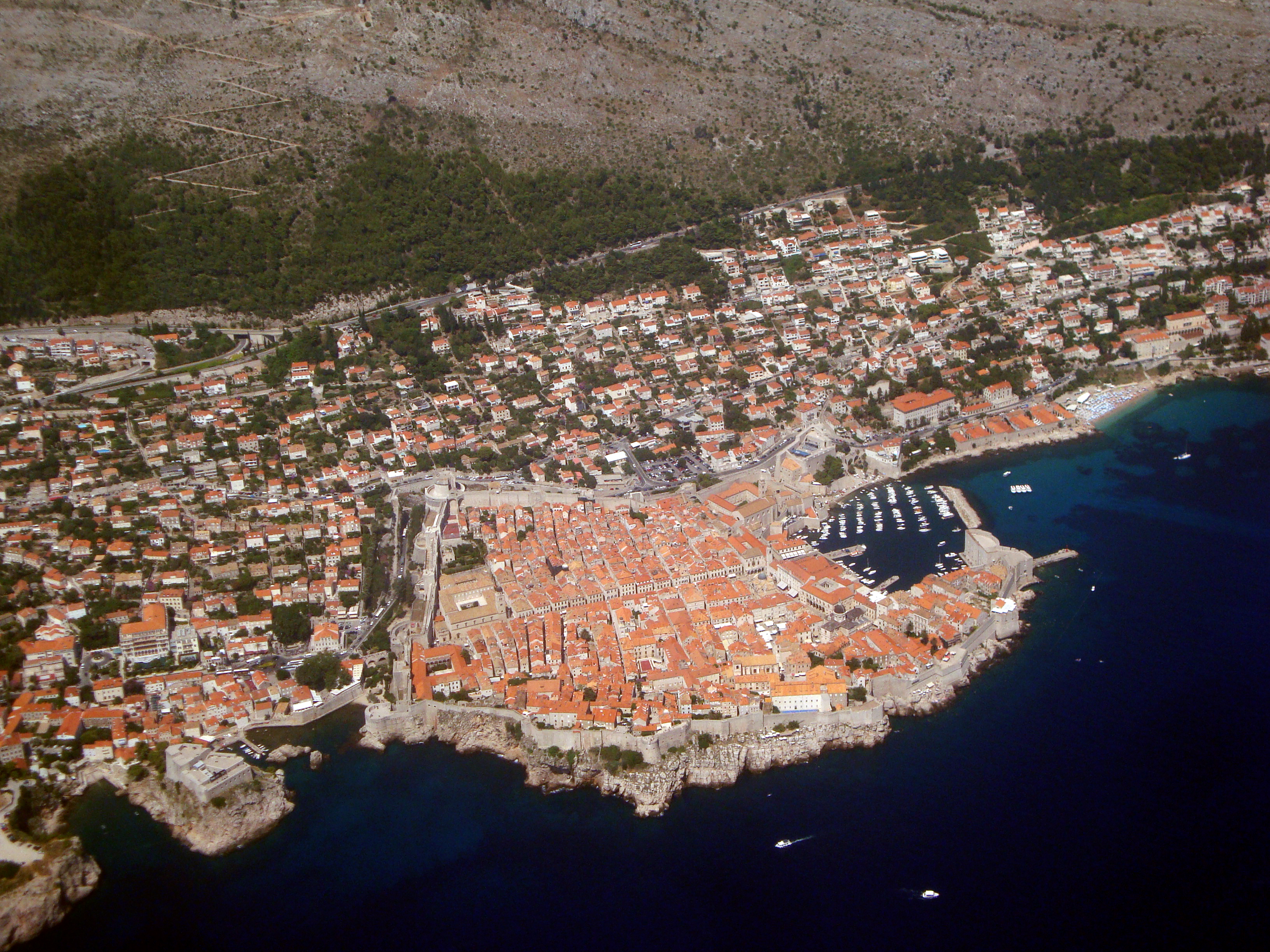
The Old City of Dubrovnik

Article 3 of the Statute of the International Criminal Tribunal for the former Yugoslavia also contains provisions that allow the prosecution of violations of the fundamental principles of the Hague Convention of 1954. On the basis of this article, for the first time since the conclusion of the convention, proceedings were brought in an international court for the destruction of cultural property during an armed conflict.

From the time of its establishment the city of Dubrovnik was under the protection of the Byzantine Empire; after the Fourth Crusade the city came under the sovereignty of Venice 1205–1358 CE, and by the Treaty of Zadar in 1358, it became part of the Hungarian-Croatian Kingdom. Following the 1815 Congress of Vienna, the city was annexed by Austria and remained part of the Austro-Hungarian Empire until the conclusion of the First World War. From 1918 to 1939 Dubrovnik was part of the Zetska Banovina District that established its Croatian connections. From 1945 to 1990 Croatia would become part of the Socialist Federal Republic of Yugoslavia. One of the most striking features of the historic city of Dubrovnik, and that which gives its characteristic appearance are its intact medieval fortifications. Its historic city walls run uninterrupted encircling the Old-City. This complex structure of fortification is one of the most complete depictions of medieval construction in the Mediterranean, consisting of a series of forts, bastions, casemates, towers and detached forts. Within the Old City are many medieval churches, cathedrals, and palaces from the Baroque period, encircled by its fortified wall, which would ensure its listed place by UNESCO as a World Heritage Site in 1972. The Old Town is not only an architectural and urban ensemble of high quality, but it is also full of museums and libraries, such as the collection of the Ragusan masters in the Dominican Monastery, the Museum of the History of Dubrovnik, the Icon Museum, and the libraries of the Franciscan and Dominican Monasteries. It also houses the archives of Ragusa, which have been kept continuously since the 13th century and are a very important source for Mediterranean history. The archives hold materials created by the civil service in the Republic of Ragusa.

The Siege of Dubrovnik was a military engagement fought between the Yugoslav People's Army (JNA) and Croatian forces which defended the city of Dubrovnik and its surroundings during the Croatian War of Independence. The Old Town was specifically targeted by the JNA even though it served no military purpose to bomb this town. At the heart of the bombing efforts by the JNA elite was the complete eradication of the memory of the Croatian people and history by erasing their cultural heritage and destroying their cultural property. The court's convictions, which among other charges were also based on this article, were issued in February 2001 against Dario Kordić, a commander of the Croatian Defence Council (HVO) during the war in Bosnia, against Miodrag Jokić, a senior commander in the navy of the Yugoslav People's Army during the Battle of Dubrovnik in 1991, and against Milan Martić, a politician and military leader of the internationally unrecognized Republic of Serbian Krajina. The attacks on the Herzegovinian city of Mostar, which in November 1993 led to the destruction of the Stari most bridge, internationally recognised as an outstanding cultural asset, led to the trial of six defendants before the International Criminal Tribunal for the former Yugoslavia in April 2006. Among them is the Croatian General Slobodan Praljak, who is suspected of having ordered the fire on the bridge.

The historic town of Mostar, spanning a deep valley of the Neretva River, developed in the 15th and 16th centuries as an Ottoman frontier town and during the Austro-Hungarian period in the 19th and 20th centuries. Mostar was mostly known for its old Turkish houses and specifically the Old Bridge; the Stari Mostar, after which it is named. In the 1990s conflict with the former Yugoslavia, however, most of the historic town and the Old Bridge were destroyed purposely by Croatian Army and their allies. This type of destruction was in step with that of the Old Town of Dubrovnik, where the aim was the eradication of the memory of the people that once occupied the land, an effort reminiscent of the Third Reich and the Nazi party. The attacks on the Herzegovinian city of Mostar, which in November 1993 led to the destruction of the Stari most bridge, internationally recognised as an outstanding cultural asset, led to the trial of six defendants before the International Criminal Tribunal for the former Yugoslavia in April 2006. Among them is the Croatian General Slobodan Praljak, who is suspected of having ordered the firing of the bridge.

=== Khmer Rouge Tribunal ===
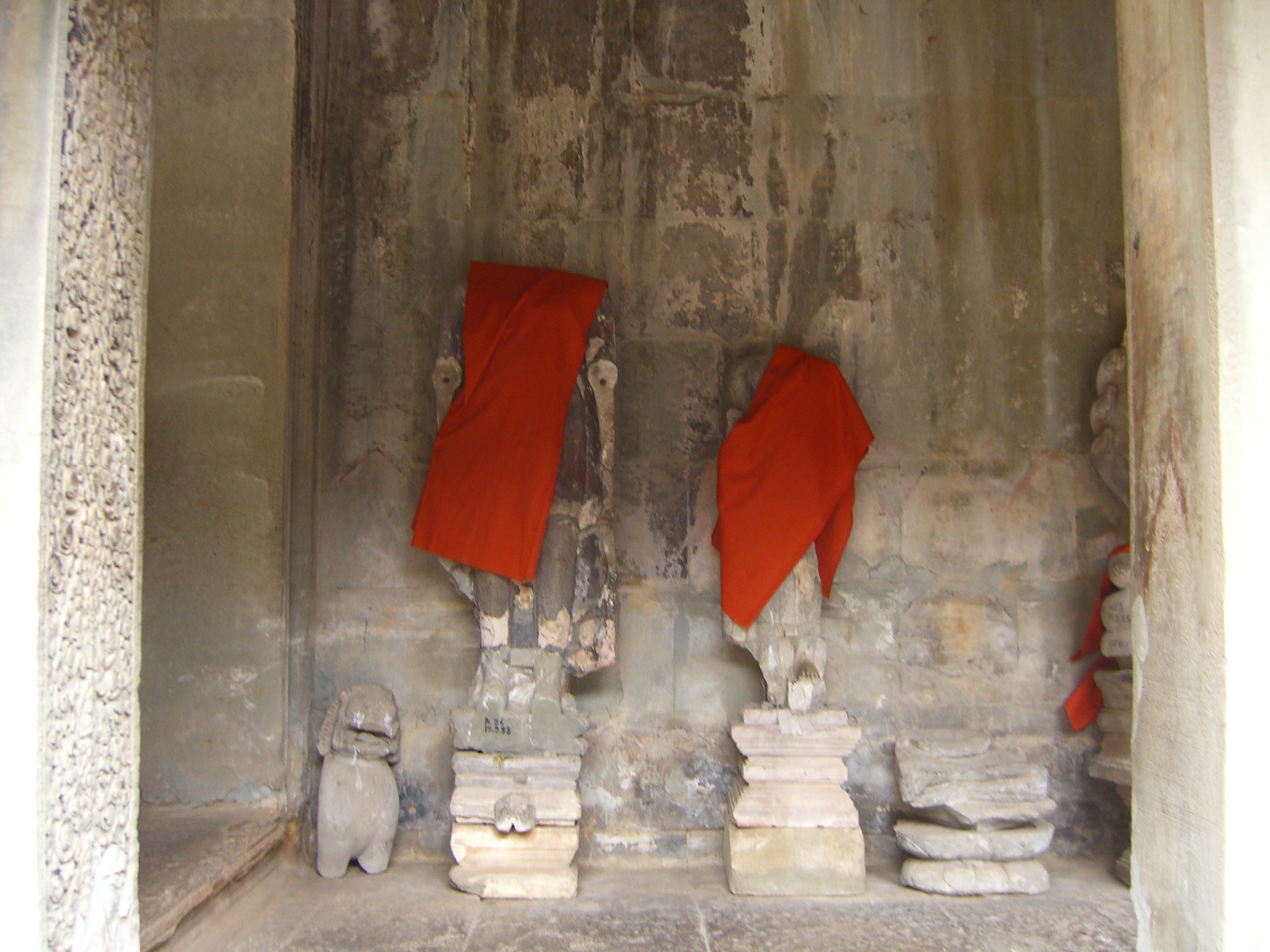
Statues in Angkor decapitated by the Khmer Rouge

The Khmer Rouge Tribunal, established by the United Nations together with the government of Cambodia in July 2006, has the possibility of prosecuting the destruction of cultural assets during the Khmer Rouge dictatorship from April 1975 to January 1979, with explicit reference to the Hague Convention of 1954, pursuant to Article 7 of the Law on the Establishment of Extraordinary Chambers. During this time, most of the more than 3,300 temples and 130 mosques in Cambodia were severely damaged by the Khmer Rouge. They also destroyed all 73 Catholic churches and many other sites of religious or cultural significance. The Hague Convention of 1954 can be applied in principle, since Cambodia became a party to the Convention in 1962, before the Khmer Rouge came to power, and because Article 19 of the Convention stipulates that even in non-international armed conflicts, each party to the conflict is bound at least by the provisions on respect for cultural property.

However, it is not yet known whether and to what extent trials will be instituted in the court which are based on the destruction of cultural property. A possible problem with the application of Article 7 and thus with the Hague Convention, is that it is a legal requirement to establish the existence of an armed conflict. This would then resemble the definition commonly used in international humanitarian law. Whether such an assessment of the Khmer Rouge dictatorship will be possible, cannot yet be predicted.

=== Destruction of cultural heritage by the Islamic State ===
Deliberate destruction and theft of cultural heritage has been conducted by the Islamic State (IS) since 2014 in Iraq, Syria, and to a lesser extent in Libya. The destruction targets various places of worship under IS control and ancient historical artifacts. In Iraq, between the fall of Mosul in June 2014 and February 2015, ISIL has plundered and destroyed at least 28 historical religious buildings. The valuable items from some buildings were looted in order to smuggle and sell them to finance ISIL activities.

Although Libya, Syria and Iraq ratified the Hague Convention for the Protection of Cultural Property in the Event of Armed Conflict in 1957, 1958 and 1967 respectively, it has not been effectively enforced.

== International acceptance and partnering organisations ==
As of June 2025, 138 States have become Party to the Hague Convention of 1954 and 115 States to the First Protocol. 92 States have become Party to the Second Protocol of 1999.

Of the five permanent members of the United Nations Security Council, France became a party in 1957. Russia is contracting party in legal succession of the Soviet Union, which also became party in 1957. the People's Republic of China ratified the convention in 2000 and the United States acceded in 2009. The United Kingdom signed the Agreement in 1954 and ratified the convention and acceded to the Protocols in 2017.

The main reason for the long period between signature and ratification by the United States were the reservations of the US Department of Defense during the Cold War, that the convention's obligations regarding the possible use of nuclear weapons could not be fulfilled. The Joint Chiefs of Staff, to which the commanders-in-chief of all units of the American armed forces belong, unanimously declared itself in 1995 in favour of voluntary compliance with the convention. On 6 January 1999, then US president Bill Clinton recommended that the US Senate ratify both agreements. In his opinion, they were not only in accordance with the principles and methods of the United States Armed Forces, but were even based on them in essential aspects. After the Senate approved accession in September 2008, the US ambassador to UNESCO, Stephen Engelken, handed over the instrument of ratification to Kōichirō Matsuura, Secretary-General of UNESCO on 13 March 2009. On the occasion of the 50th anniversary of the signing of the convention on 14 May 2004, the Government of the United Kingdom declared its intention to become a party to the convention and the two Protocols. This was due to the conclusion of the Second Protocol of 1999, which, in the view of the British government, eliminated essential weaknesses and ambiguities of the 1954 Convention. A draft law containing ratification of the convention, the two protocols and criminal law provisions was announced by the UK government in November 2006.

=== UNESCO ===
The United Nations Educational, Scientific and Cultural Organization (UNESCO) is a legally independent specialized agency of the United Nations based in Paris, working in the field of dissemination and implementation of the protection of cultural property in armed conflicts. It acts as depositary of the Hague Convention of 1954 and its two Protocols and administers the International Register of Cultural Property under Special Protection.

=== Blue Shield International ===
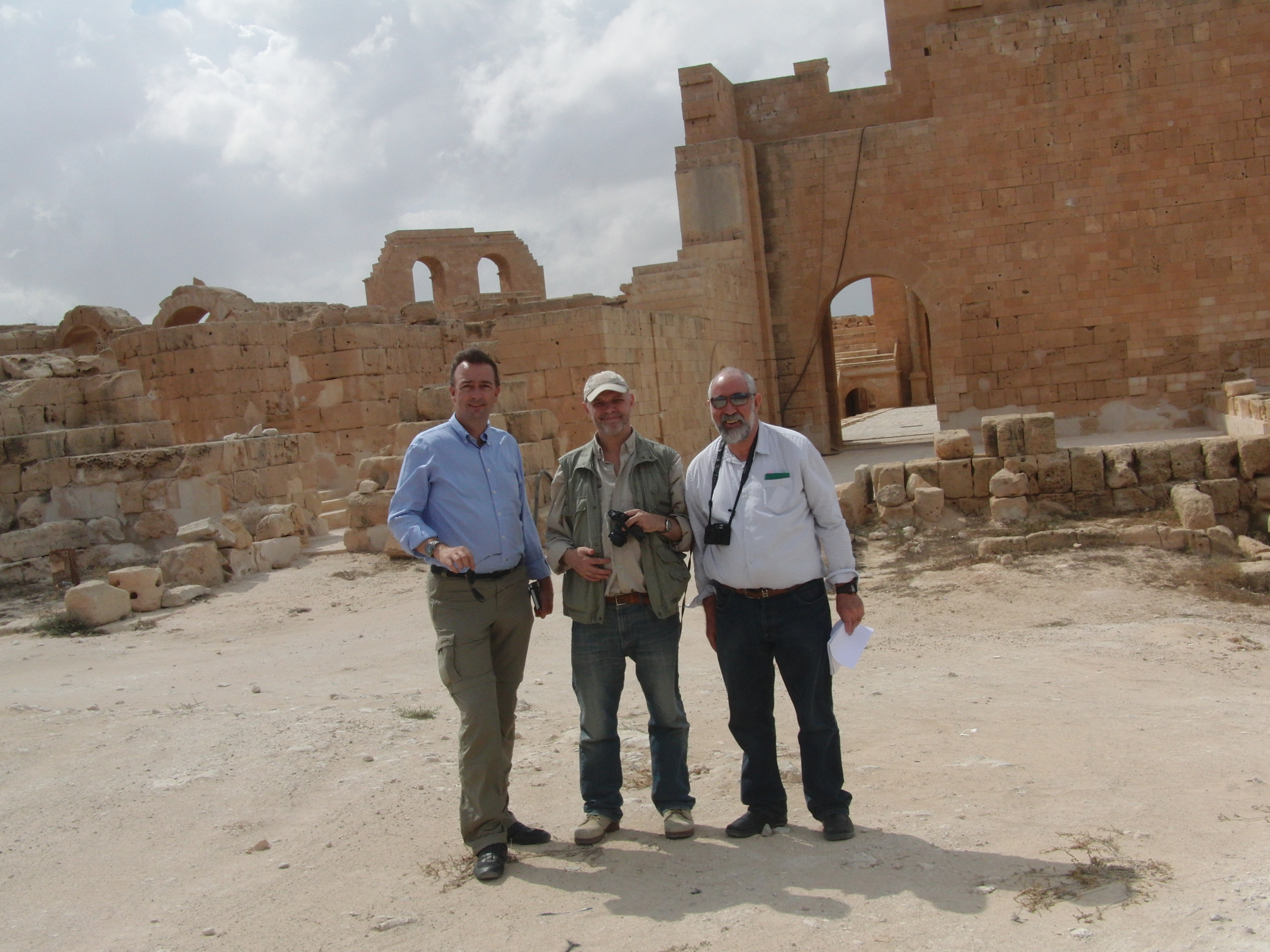
Karl von Habsburg, on a Blue Shield International fact-finding mission in Libya

In addition, Blue Shield International (formerly the International Committee of the Blue Shield, ICBS; in French Comité International du Bouclier Bleu, CIBB) has existed since 1996. Its mission is to improve international cooperation in the field of cultural heritage protection and to support local and regional activities. The Second Protocol of 1999 explicitly mentions in Articles 11 and 27 the consultative role of the International Committee of the Blue Shield in the implementation of the Agreement. Since the International Committee was founded in 1996, national Blue Shield Committees have been established in Argentina, Australia, Belgium, Benin, Brazil, Chile, Curaçao, Denmark, France, Georgia, Guatemala, Haiti, Ireland, Israel, Italy, Madagascar, Macedonia, the Netherlands, Norway, Poland, Romania, Senegal, Spain, the Czech Republic, Ukraine and the US, comparable to the International Red Cross and Red Crescent Movement. The Association of the National Committees of the Blue Shield (ANCBS) was established on September 28, 2006, as the umbrella organization for the national committees. ANCBS and ICBS merged in 2016, to become the Blue Shield. International activities are now represented by Blue Shield International, who also work to coordinate and support the work of the national committees.

While in many wars the freedom of movement of United Nations personnel is significantly restricted due to security concerns, Blue Shield is regarded as particularly suitable due to its structure to act flexibly and autonomously in armed conflicts. Despite the partial dissolution of state structures and the very unclear security situation resulting from the wars and unrest in Iraq, Syria, Mali, Egypt and Libya, the employees of Blue Shield and its national organizations then carried out very robust undertakings to protect the cultural assets there. This concerns in particular the collection of cultural assets to be protected, the compilation with local experts of "no-strike lists" (which preserve the coordinates of important cultural monuments), the linking of civil and military structures and the training of local military personnel with regard to the protection of cultural assets. From Blue Shield's point of view, it is not enough to develop and adopt international law norms such as the Second Protocol to the Hague Convention for the Protection of Cultural Property in the Event of Armed Conflict or the Doha Statement of the Conference of 'Ulamâ on Islam and Cultural Heritage'. It is necessary to implement these standards effectively on a global scale. This also concerns the prevention of the illicit trade in antiquities and stolen cultural assets to finance military conflicts. As a result of the destruction of cultural assets by armed conflict, war and unrest in Iraq, Syria, Mali or Afghanistan, but also by earthquakes such as in Haiti or Nepal, cooperation has developed between Blue-Shield and national armed forces such as the US Army or the British Army.

=== Other civil society structures ===
The "International League of National Societies for the Protection of Cultural Property", based in the Swiss city of Freiburg, was also established in May 1997 as an international umbrella organisation. Through the activities of these national and international organisations and associations, which also include the protection of cultural property against disasters in times of peace, civil society structures will play an increasing role in the field of cultural property protection and support the work of state and international institutions.

One example of international cooperation in the protection of cultural assets was the temporary storage of art treasures from the National Museum in Kabul, Afghanistan, in Switzerland. The art objects, which were severely threatened in the National Museum both by the Afghan Civil War (1996–2001) that lasted until 1995 and by the subsequent rule of the Taliban regime, were moved to a so-called "Afghanistan Museum in Exile" in the Swiss town of Bubendorf in 1999 with the consent of all parties to the conflict. The exhibition, which was supported primarily by the voluntary work of Swiss citizens and exiled Afghans, as well as by donations of around 1.5 million Swiss francs and supervised by the Swiss Afghanistan Institute based in Bubendorf, was open to the public from October 2000 to October 2006 and was visited by around 50,000 people during this time. In March 2007, the objects were returned to Kabul under the direction of UNESCO and with the support of the German Air Force. According to the spokesman of the Bubendorf Museum, this was the largest return of art objects since the end of the Second World War.

In contrast, the Iraqi National Museum in Baghdad was heavily plundered and damaged from 8 to 12 April 2003, some three weeks after the start of the Iraq War. The museum was reopened only three years earlier on 28 April 2000, nine years after its closure as a result of the Second Gulf War. Later investigations carried out by a US commission in collaboration with museum staff found evidence of at least three independent incidents. According to the commission's findings, the looting was sometimes spontaneous and indiscriminate. However, a number of indications also pointed out that the thieves had a good knowledge of the museum and expert knowledge of the cultural assets on display. Although particularly valuable objects were kept in the cellar of the museum in the run-up to the war, considerable losses were also incurred here. The Commission corrected initial estimates of some 170,000 stolen works of art to 11,000–15,000 stolen objects. By the time the study results were published in 2005, about 5,000 of them had been recovered in various ways.

== See also ==
- National heritage site
- Roerich Pact
- The Blue Shield
