= Cultural property =

Physical cultural heritage, e.g. monuments

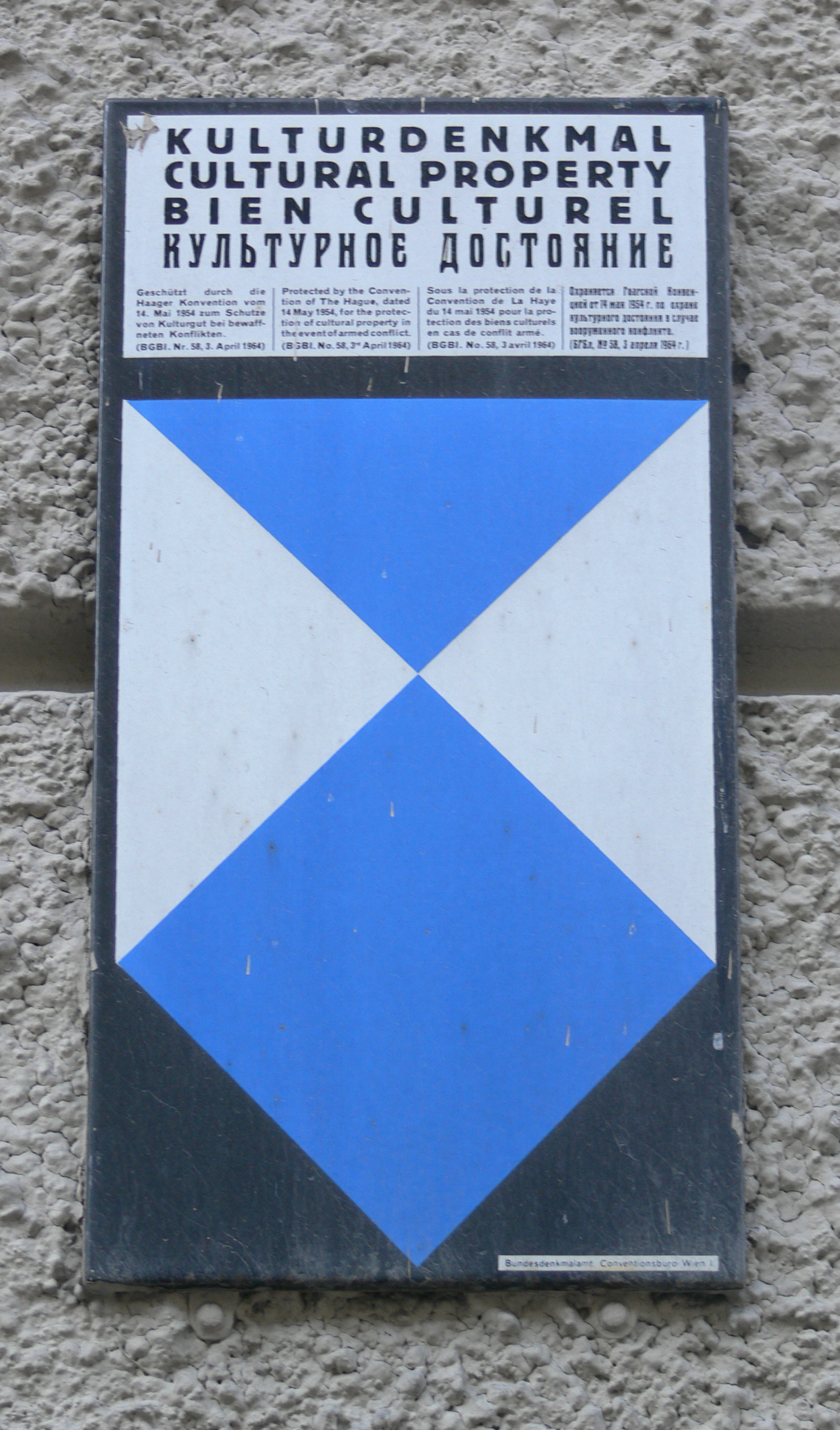
Plaque of the Federal Monuments Office on a building in Salzburg indicating "Cultural property" in four languages; German: Kulturdenkmal, English: Cultural property, French: Bien culturel, and Russian: Культурное достояние.

Cultural property, also known as cultural patrimony, comprises the physical items that are part of the cultural heritage of a group or society, as opposed to less tangible cultural expressions. They include such items as cultural landscapes, historic buildings, works of art, archaeological sites, as well as collections of libraries, archives, and museums.

Cultural property is legally protected by a number of international agreements and national laws. Protection of cultural property can involve responses to threats such as deliberate attacks, looting, illicit trafficking and vandalism. There is intensive cooperation between the United Nations, UNESCO and Blue Shield International on the protection of cultural goods.

== Definition ==
The phrase was used in various contexts in the 19th century. In 1891, The Bulletin of the United States Fish Commission described various countries' relationships to their fishing-related cultural properties including Germany, England, France, Italy, and Holland. In 1899, it was also used in the context of oyster fishing in Holland.

There is no universally agreed-upon definition of cultural property. One widely used definition is provided by Article 1 of the Hague Convention for the Protection of Cultural Property in the Event of Armed Conflict of 1954:

"The term 'cultural property' shall cover, irrespective of origin or ownership:
(a) movable or immovable property of great importance to the cultural heritage of every people, such as monuments of architecture, art, or history, whether religious or secular; archaeological sites; groups of buildings which, as a whole, are of historical or artistic interest; works of art; manuscripts, books and other objects of artistic, historical or archaeological interest; as well as scientific collections and important collections of books or archives or reproductions of the property defined above;
(b) buildings whose main and effective purpose is to preserve or exhibit the movable cultural property defined in sub-paragraph (a) such as museums, large libraries and depositories of archives, and refuges intended to shelter, in the event of armed conflict, the movable cultural property defined in sub-paragraph (a);
(c) centers containing a large amount of cultural property as defined in sub-paragraphs (a) and (b), to be known as 'centers containing monuments'."

Cultural heritage has been described as the 'most distinguishing form of a culture's expression' and includes both tangible and intangible elements such as 'traditional dances, customs and ceremonies'. Cultural property is the essential elements of a culture that allow it to determined and identified.

== Emblem ==
The Blue Shield is a symbol of protection that identifies cultural property to be protected in the event of armed conflict and those responsible for protecting it: its use is restricted under international law. The 1954 Hague Convention for the Protection of Cultural Property in the Event of Armed Conflict describes the logo and lays down conditions for its use.

Article 16 of the Convention describes the internationally recognized mark for cultural property as follows:

(1) The distinctive emblem of the Convention shall take the form of a shield, pointed below, persaltire blue and white (a shield consisting of a royal-blue square, one of the angles of which forms the point of the shield, and of a royal-blue triangle above the square, the space on either side being taken up by a white triangle).
Use of the Emblem is restricted under international humanitarian law. Guidance for using the emblem is available from The Blue Shield, and UNESCO.

== History ==
The theme of the 1998 and 1999 International Museum Day was "The Fight against Illicit Traffic of Cultural Property."

== See also ==
- Heritage asset
- Heritage site
- World Heritage Site
- National Heritage Site
- National Monument
- Philippine Registry of Cultural Property
- National Commission for Culture and the Arts
