= Krešimir Rotim =

Croatian doctor and neurosurgeon (born 1967)

- Born: April 23, 1967 (age 59)
- Education: University of Zagreb
- Occupations: Doctor, neurosurgeon, academic
- Awards: Order of Danica Croatia “Večernjak Seal” Award (2010)

Kresimir Rotim (born April 23, 1967) is a Croatian doctor and neurosurgeon.

== Education ==
Born in Vukovar, Rotim graduated from the Faculty of Medicine in Zagreb in 1991. In 1998, he passed the specialist exam in neurosurgery and continued to work at the KBC Zagreb Neurosurgery Clinic. In September 2000, he successfully defended his dissertation "Endoscopic Ventriculostomy of the Third Cerebral Ventricle with an Ultrasonic Contact Microprobe" at the same faculty.

== Medical career ==
Since the end of 2006, Rotim was head of the Clinic for Neurosurgery at KBC Sestara milosrdnica. In April 2008, he was elected director of the said KBC and affiliated hospitals – the Tumor Clinic, the Zagreb Clinic for Pediatric Diseases and the Traumatology Clinic – and has held that post until April 2012.

== Academic career ==
Rotim teaches Anatomy and Surgery at the University of Applied Health Sciences in Zagreb. He has been teaching at the Department of Surgery at the Faculty of Medicine in Split since September 2009, as well as at the Faculty of Medicine, University of Mostar, since December 2009. Since 2010, he works as an Assistant Professor for the Scientific Area of Biomedicine and Health, the field of clinical medical science, a branch of surgery at the Faculty of Medicine, University of Zagreb, and works at the Department of Surgery at the KBC Sestara milosrdnica. He was appointed by the Croatian Parliament in July 2011 as a member of the National Health Council.

He is the president of the Croatian Society for Cerebrovascular Neurosurgery, the Croatian Society for the Spinal Surgery of the Croatian Medical Association, and the Association of Neurosurgeons of Southeast Europe (Seens). He is a member of the commission for biomedicine and health care and the parliamentary committee for science of the Croatian Parliament. He is also a member of the European Academy of Sciences and Arts.

== Publications ==
Rotim has published 119 scientific and professional papers and congress press releases in domestic and international scientific and professional journals and 4 professional and scientific books.

== Awards ==
With the decision of the president of the Republic of Croatia, Rotim received the Order of Danica Croatia with the image of Katarina Zrinska. In 2010, he was elected scientist of the year – he received the “Večernjak Seal” Award.
