= Blue Shield International =

International organization protecting cultural heritage

The Blue Shield
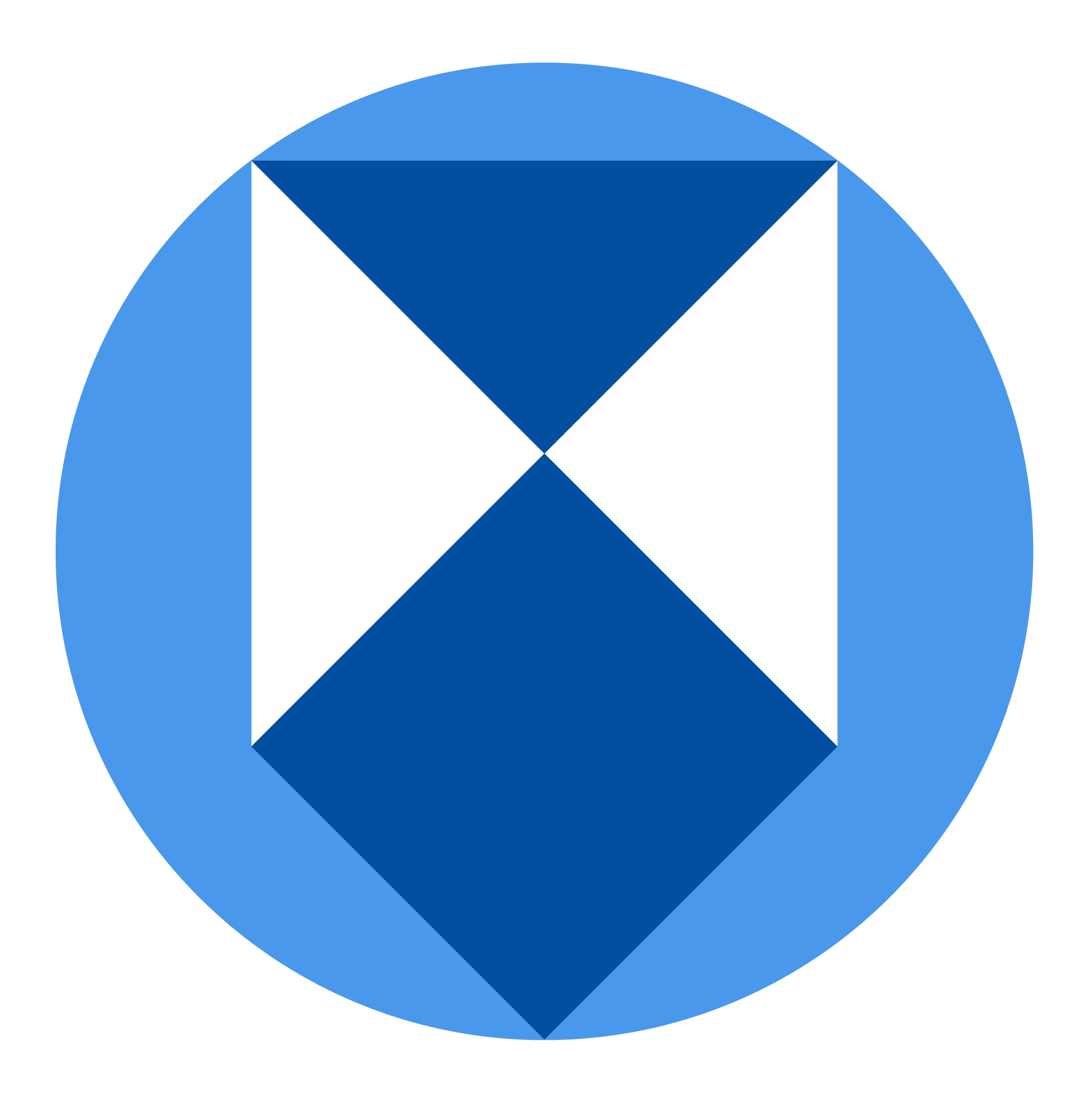
- Logo of the Blue Shield
- Formation: The Blue Shield was formed in 2016 from the amalgamation of ICBS (1996) and ANCBS (2006). They adopted this logo in 2018.
- Type: Non-governmental organization
- Headquarters: Registered in the Netherlands, but the paid staff are located in Newcastle University, England
- Region served: Worldwide
- Fields: Hague Convention for the Protection of Cultural Property in the Event of Armed Conflict Cultural property
- Founding President: Karl von Habsburg
- President: Peter G. Stone
- Website: theblueshield.org

The Blue Shield, formerly the International Committee of the Blue Shield, is an international organization founded in 1996 to protect the world's cultural heritage from threats such as armed conflict and natural disasters. Originally intended as the "cultural equivalent of the Red Cross", its name derives from the blue shield symbol designed by Jan Zachwatowicz, used to signify cultural sites protected by the 1954 Hague Convention for the Protection of Cultural Property in Armed Conflict.

The Blue Shield's mission statement is in their statutes. It is a network of committees of dedicated individuals across the world that is “committed to the protection of the world's cultural property, and is concerned with the protection of cultural and natural heritage, tangible and intangible, in the event of armed conflict, natural- or human-made disaster.”

Blue Shield is a close partner organization with the UN, United Nations peacekeeping and UNESCO and in cooperation with the International Committee of the Red Cross.

== History ==
Following the Second World War, which saw extensive damage and widespread theft of cultural heritage throughout Europe and Asia, the United Nations Educational, Scientific and Cultural Organization (UNESCO) was founded in 1946 with the official aim of promoting peace, development, and dialogue through cultural exchange and preservation. At the behest of the Netherlands, UNESCO helped draft and sponsor the Hague Convention for the Protection of Cultural Property in the Event of Armed Conflict, the first widely ratified international treaty that focused exclusively on the protection of cultural property in armed conflict; it entered into force on 7 August 1956, obligating states parties to protect cultural property in both peacetime and war, including those located in combatant nations.

The International Committee of the Blue Shield (ICBS) was established in 1996 by the four major non-governmental heritage organisations, which represent professionals active in the fields of archives, libraries, monuments and sites, and museums:

- ICA: International Council on Archives
- ICOM: International Council of Museums
- ICOMOS: International Council on Monuments and Sites
- IFLA: International Federation of Library Associations and Institutions

to further the protection of heritage in conflict. Article 27.3 of the 1954 Hague Convention Second Protocol (1999) explicitly mentions the International Committee of the Blue Shield as an advisory body to the Committee for the Protection of Cultural Property in the Event of Armed Conflict. The four organisations worked together to prepare for, and respond to, emergency situations that could affect cultural heritage. They were joined in 2005 by the CCAAA (Co-ordinating Council of Audiovisual Archives Associations), who later left in 2012. The "founding four" supplied a secretariat for the organisation which rotated once every three years between them. Julien Anfruns was President of the International Committee of the Blue Shield (ICBS) between 2009 and 2013.

By 2000, national committees had begun to form to protect cultural heritage in their countries. In 2006, a conference Towards Solid Organisation: Infrastructure and Awareness was held at the Hague in the Netherlands, attended by the national committees and the ICBS. At this event, the Hague Accord was written, establishing the Association of National Committees of the Blue Shield (ANCBS) to coordinate the work of the national committees. The ANCBS came into formal existence in 2008: Karl von Habsburg was appointed as the first President. During this time, he undertook a number of fact finding missions to countries in conflict to learn more about the damage to their cultural heritage.

While in many wars the freedom of movement of the United Nations personnel is significantly restricted due to security concerns, Blue Shield is considered to be particularly suitable due to its structure enabling it to act flexibly and autonomously in particularly dangerous armed conflicts. Joris Kila, art historian for Blue Shield and the Competence Center for Cultural Heritage at the University of Vienna, sums it up as follows: "Unesco and other institutions consider it too dangerous to inspect the places in Libya themselves, whether they are damaged or not. So Karl von Habsburg and I decided that we had to do it ourselves. We were in Ras-Almergib, a site right next to Leptis Magna, where a radar and air defense station of the Gaddafi troops was destroyed, less than 15 meters away from a Roman fort that remained intact. The ancient site was on our list."

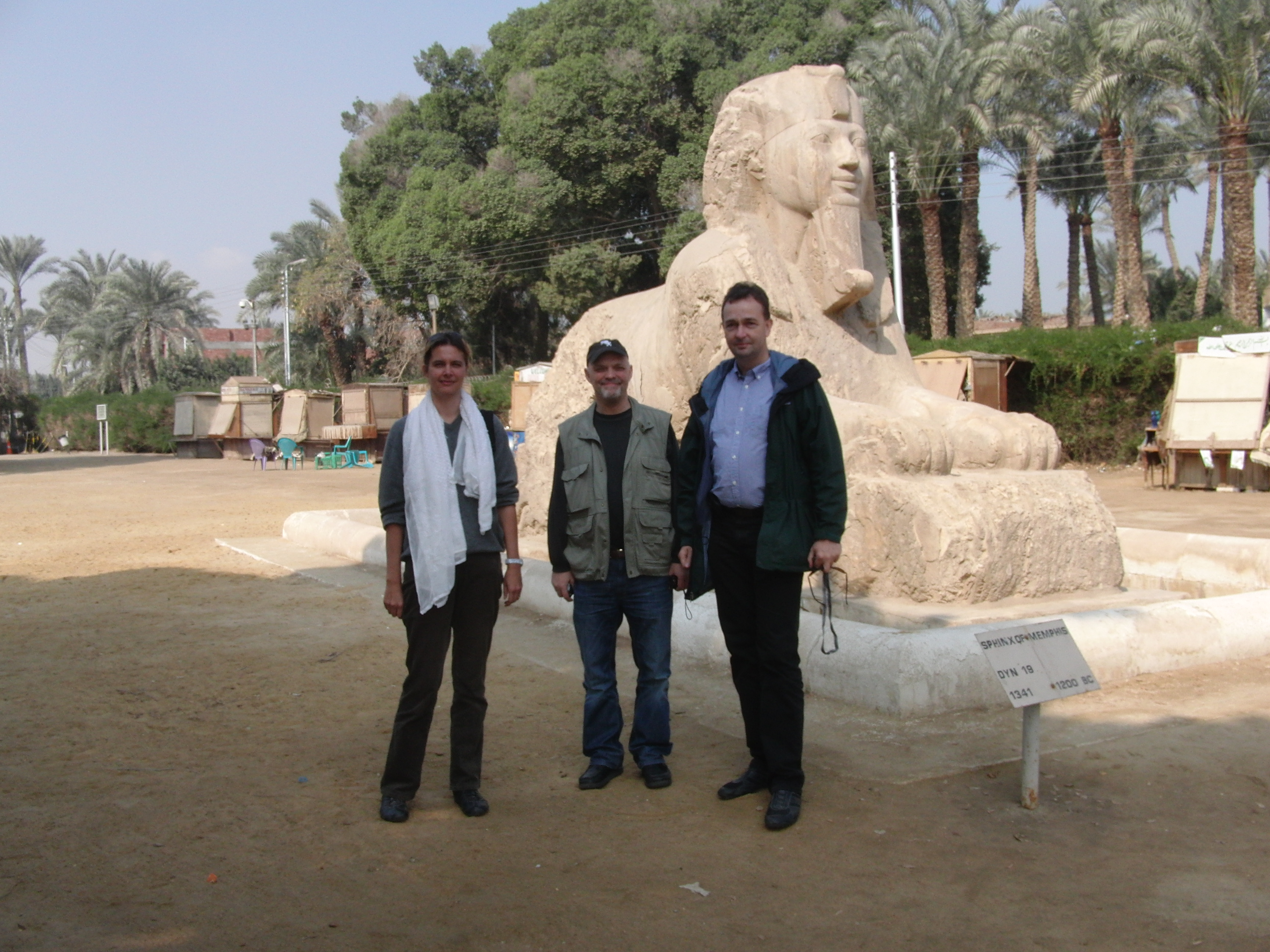
ANCBS Fact Finding Mission Egypt, 2011. Karl von Habsburg is on the right.

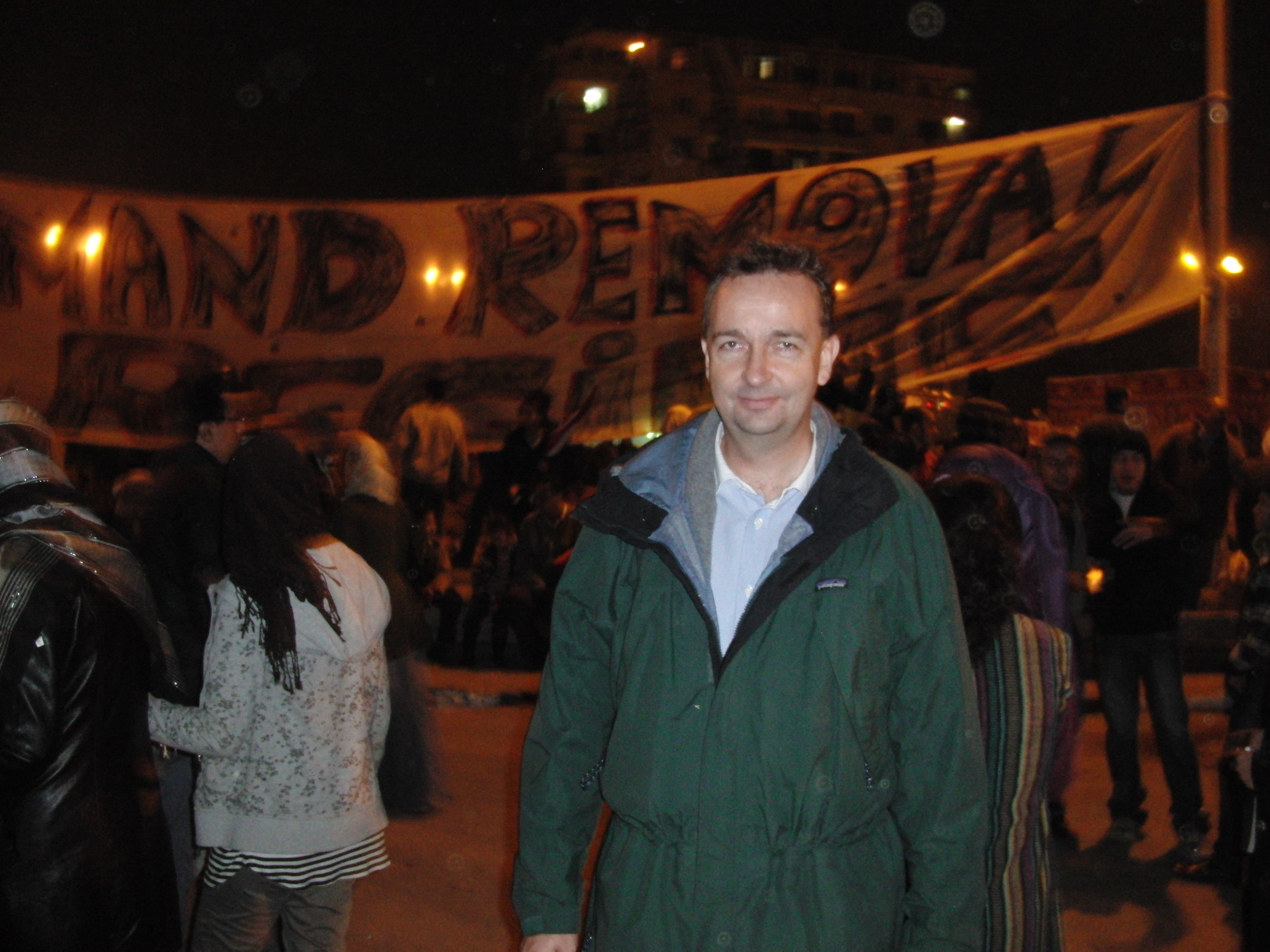
ANCBS Fact Finding mission to Egypt, 2011 - Karl von Habsburg

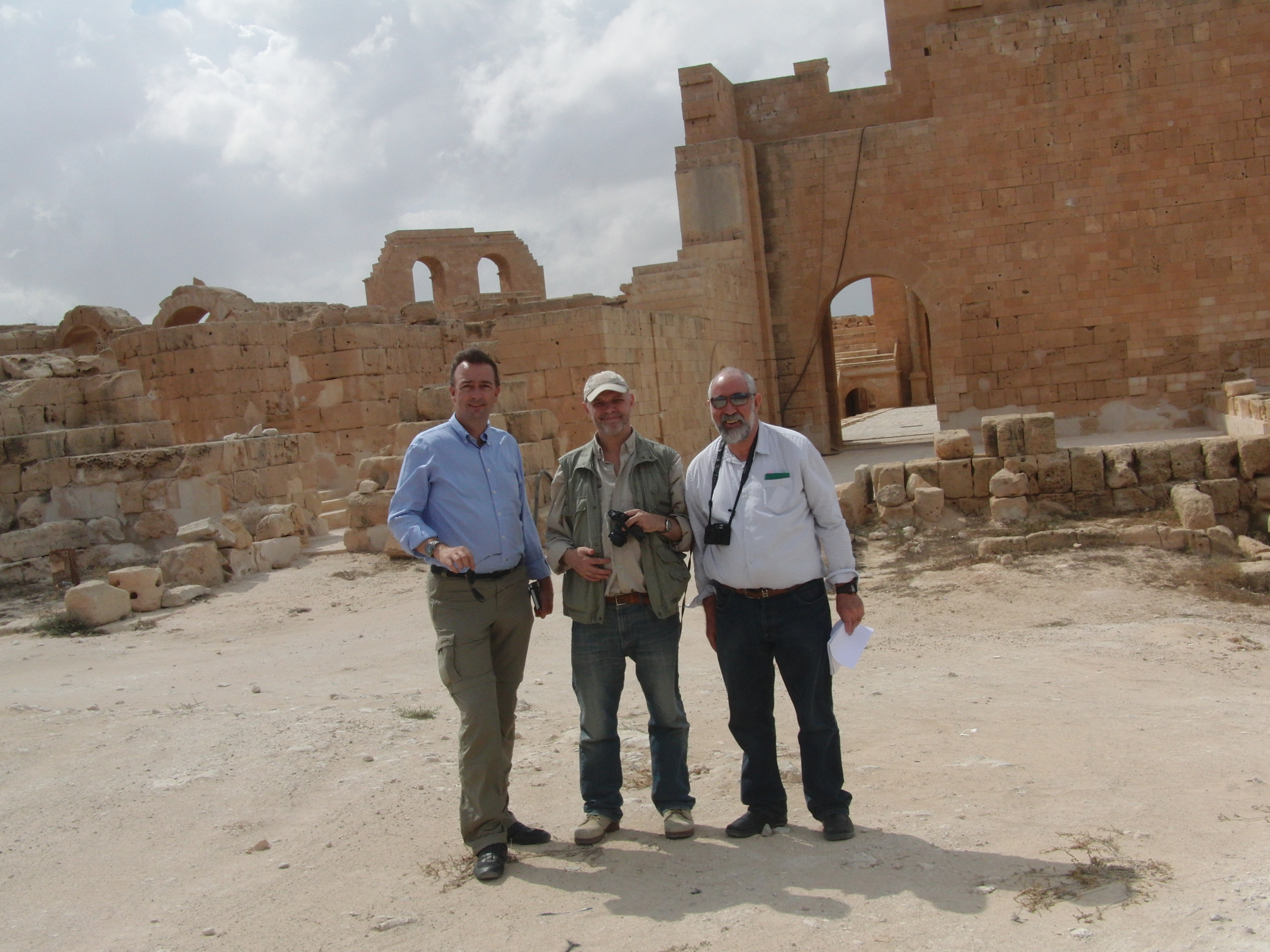
Blue Shield First Assessment Mission to Libya, September 28 to 30, 2011. Karl von Habsburg is on the left, and Hafed Walda on the right.

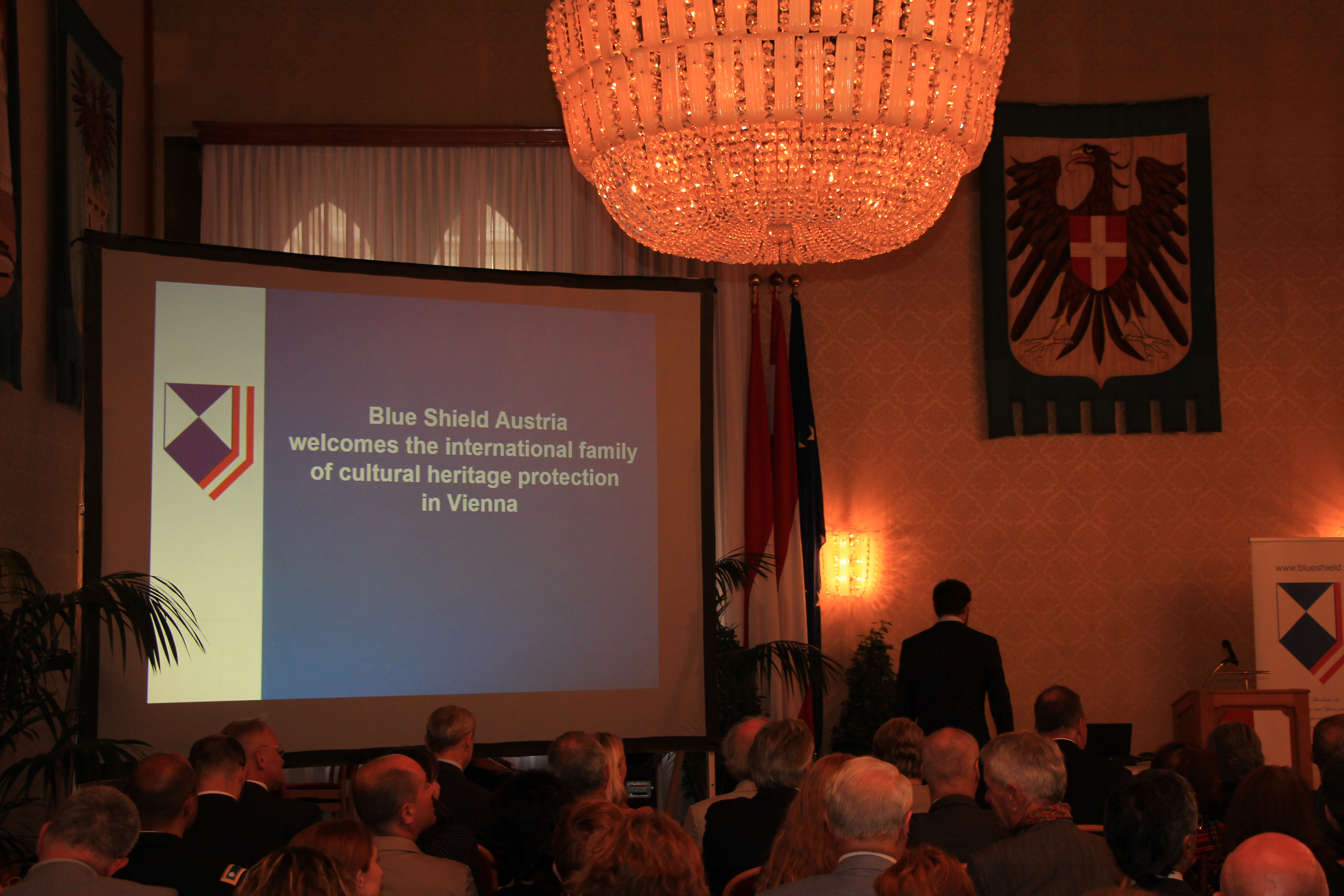
Presentation by the Austrian Committee of the Blue Shield at the General Assembly September 2017 in the Rathaus, Vienna

In terms of cultural property protection, there is therefore intensive cooperation between Blue Shield, the United Nations and UNESCO. The cooperation between UNESCO and Blue Shield International is to be further strengthened, according to the then Director General of UNESCO Irina Bokova. "UNESCO and Blue Shield International share a common goal" and "We seek to protect cultural property, and, by extension, humanity's cultural legacy", said Bokova in October 2017 at a conference of Blue Shield International.

In 2016, ICBS and ANCBS amalgamated to become simply "The Blue Shield", amending the ANCBS statutes to reflect these changes, and registering the Blue Shield as an association in the Netherlands. These statutes were formally approved by the Blue Shield General Assembly (2017) in Vienna.

Language preservation is also protection of cultural heritage, as former President Habsburg stated: "Today, on average, we lose one language in the world every six weeks. There are approximately 6800 languages. But four per cent of the population speaks 96 per cent of the languages, and 96 per cent of the population speaks four per cent of the languages. These four per cent are spoken by large language groups and are therefore not at risk. But 96 per cent of the languages we know are more or less at risk. You have to treat them like extinct species."

A special concern of Blue Shield International is the protection of cultural heritage during military peace operations. 40 lecturers and participants from America, Denmark, Lebanon, Italy, Croatia, Slovakia and Austria had the opportunity at the "Blue Helmet Forum 2019" to deal with the topic. Experiences of the US Army, operational experience in Iraq and Afghanistan and the establishment of a separate Italian cultural property unit were also discussed. Karl von Habsburg spoke about the need to protect cultural property not only during and after conflicts, but also outside of armed conflicts.

In 2020, Blue Shield International and the UN peacekeeping forces in Lebanon, in collaboration with the Lebanese Armed Forces, completed a month-long project to secure and protect the cultural property damaged after the August 4th explosions in Beirut.

== Composition ==
The Blue Shield is a protective symbol to be used in armed conflict to identify cultural property to be protected in the event of armed conflict and those responsible for protecting it: its use is restricted under international law. The 1954 Hague Convention for the Protection of Cultural Property in the Event of Armed Conflict describes the logo and lays down conditions for its use.

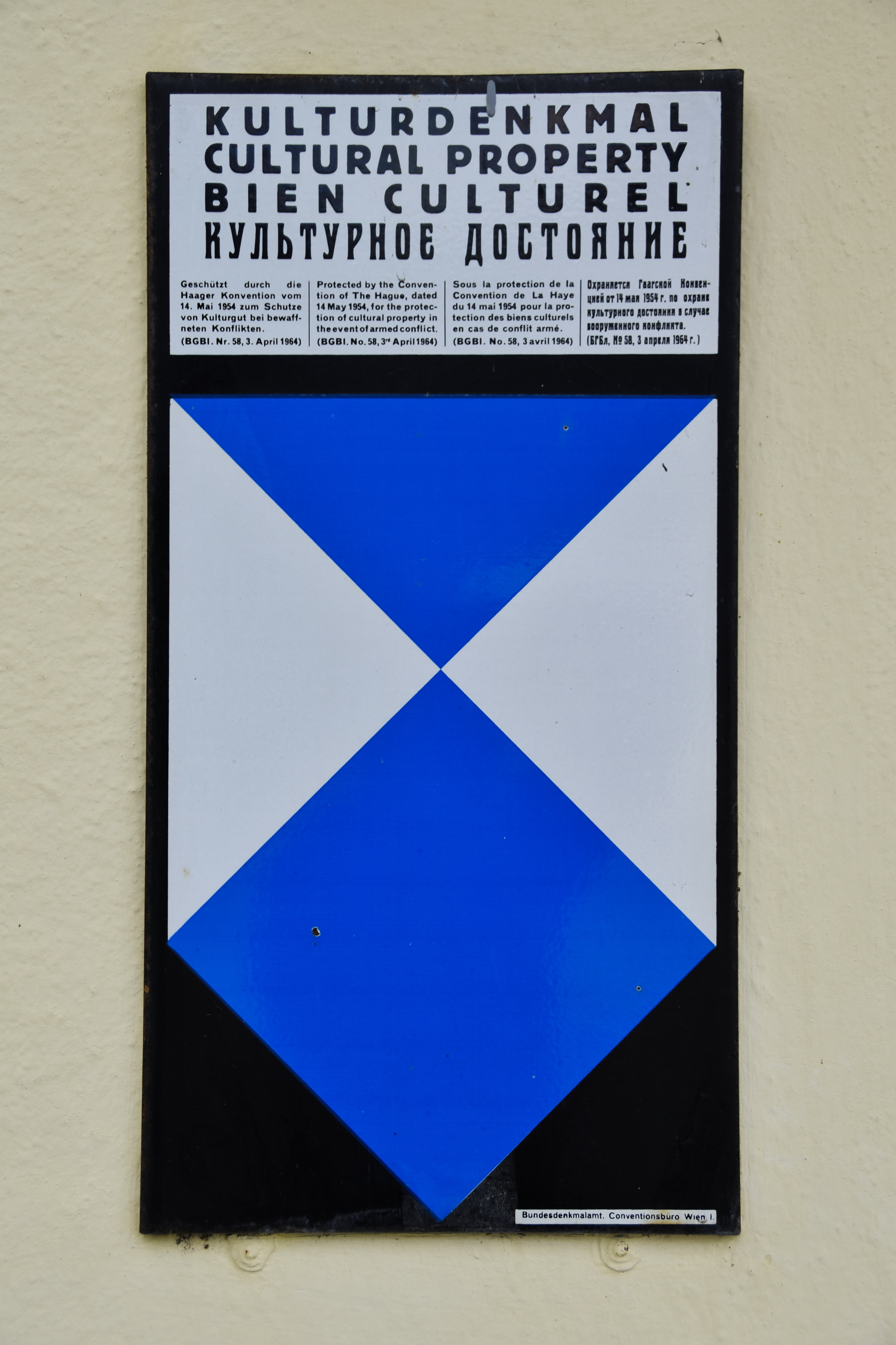
The Blue Shield mounted on the outside of a building in Austria

The Blue Shield is formed from national committees around the world, coordinated by an International Board - Blue Shield International (BSI). BSI maintains a list of national committees on their website.

The BSI Board is formed from nine people. There are four nominated representatives from ICA, ICOM, ICOMOS, and IFLA. The General Assembly also votes in four members who have stood for election from national committees. A new board is appointed every three years at the General Assembly. Karl von Habsburg was appointed as the first President of the Blue Shield at the 2017 General Assembly; and Peter Stone was appointed as the vice-president. In 2020, Habsburg stepped down, having Chaired the organisation since 2008 (initially as President of ANCBS). He was replaced by Stone at the August 2020 General Assembly.

In support of Peter Stone's work in cultural property protection, Newcastle University funded the first full-time Secretariat for the organisation in 2017, consisting of one full-time staff member - Dr Emma Cunliffe and one part time member - Dr Paul Fox stepped down the end of December 2019, and was replaced by Dr Michael Delacruz.

== Mission and areas of activity ==
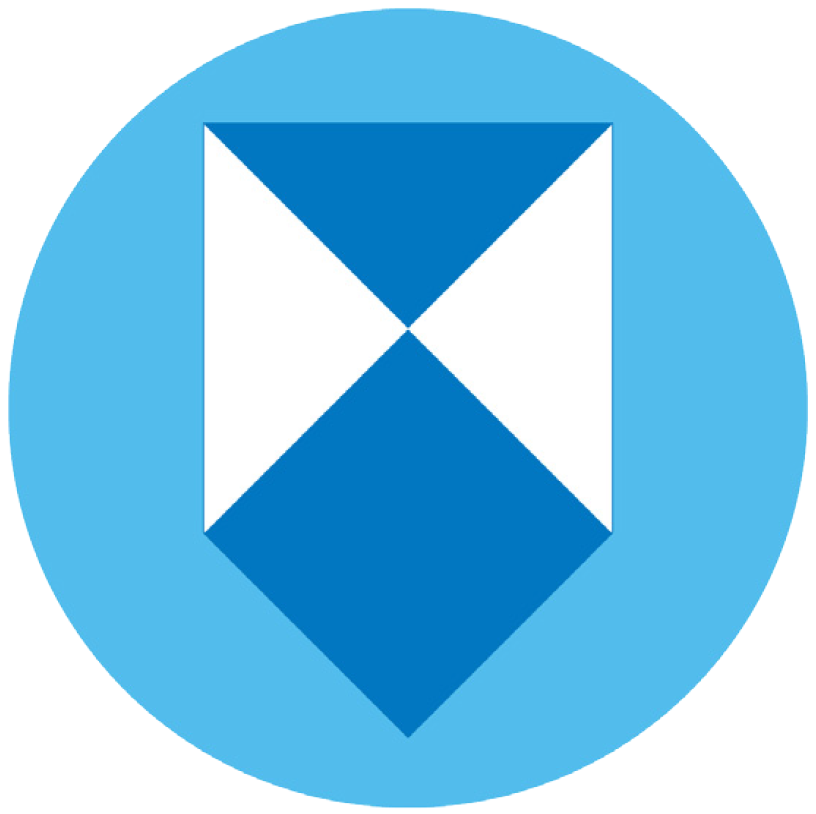
Logo of the ANCBS

The Blue Shield is a network of committees of dedicated individuals across the world that is:

committed to the protection of the world's cultural property, and is concerned with the protection of cultural and natural heritage, tangible and intangible, in the event of armed conflict, natural- or human-made disaster.

The key goals of the Blue Shield are laid out in Article 2 of the Blue Shield Statutes 2016. They are to:

- protect cultural and natural heritage – tangible and intangible – from the effects of conflict and environmental disaster;
- promote the ratification of, respect for, and implementation of, the 1954 Hague Convention and its two Protocols;
- raise awareness of the importance of protecting heritage in emergency situations;
- promote and provide relevant training (to heritage professionals, the armed forces, other emergency responders, and those involved in preventing the illicit trafficking of looted objects);
- promote community engagement with and participation in protecting cultural property (CP);
- encourage co-operation with, and between, other relevant entities involved in emergency situations.

The work of the Blue Shield is underpinned by international law – in particular, the 1954 Hague Convention on the Protection of Cultural Property in the Event of Armed Conflict and its two Protocols of 1954 and 1999, which are considered to be part of international humanitarian law (IHL). IHL, also known as the Law of War or Law of Armed Conflict, is a set of rules which seek, for humanitarian reasons, to limit the effects of armed conflict on people and property. This primary context is also informed by a number of other international legal instruments, by the international cultural protection agenda as set by the UN and UNESCO, and by international initiatives regarding environmental disaster such as the Sendai Framework for Disaster Risk Reduction. Although the 1954 Hague Convention and its two Protocols refer to cultural property, recognising the developments in our understanding of culture across the world, and the different ways it manifests, the Blue Shield deals with the broader concept of cultural heritage.

Blue Shield's mission and goals are delivered through six proactive areas of activity. With respect to cultural property protection (CPP) in the event of armed conflict and natural/human-made disasters, the Blue Shield works in the areas of:

- Proactive protection and risk preparedness;
- Emergency response;
- Stabilisation, post-disaster recovery, and long-term/ongoing support activities;
- Legal compliance, policy, and their implementation;
- Capacity building activities, and education and training in support of the Blue Shield's Areas of Activity;
- Co-ordination – of Blue Shield members and with partner organisations.

The Blue Shield realises these Areas of Activity in the following national and international contexts:

- Contributing the development and delivery of plans and actions for proactive planning, emergency response, stabilisation, post-disaster recovery, and long-term/ongoing support activities at the national and international level, coordinating support to affected national committees from the international community as requested.
- Promoting and developing understanding of the international laws which underpin the Blue Shield's work
- Contributing to the development of policies in relation to national and international cultural protection agendas, and promoting their implementation.
- Developing policy for the Blue Shield, and interpreting and implementing it at the national level. BSI recognises that its work must be interpreted in a national context, taking account of national legislation and policy.
- Working with partners to support capacity building activities and develop and deliver education and training materials and courses in support of the Blue Shield's Areas of Activity.
- Co-ordinating the work of the Blue Shield national committees, and national / international partners. Blue Shield does not work in isolation. International partners include: UNESCO, ICA, ICOM, ICOMOS, IFLA and other international heritage organisations; NATO and other multi-national forces; and other international organisations involved in cultural property protection. National partners include: government departments, national ministries of defence, emergency response units, and other national organisations involved in CPP, such as national committees or branches of ICA, ICOM, ICOMOS, IFLA, and the National Commissions of UNESCO.

The Blue Shield formally adopted the Four Tier Approach to the protection of cultural property in the event of armed conflict at its 2017 General Assembly, describing the four times when heritage professionals aim to work with armed forces to protect cultural property.

Blue Shield International is committed to providing training in cultural property protection for members of armed forces around the world, and lists NATO amongst its partners. In addition to their work with NATO, in 2017-2018, they contributed to training for national armed forces in Georgia, peacekeeping forces deployed by Fiji, and ran exercises at an international workshop in Austria.

== Logo ==
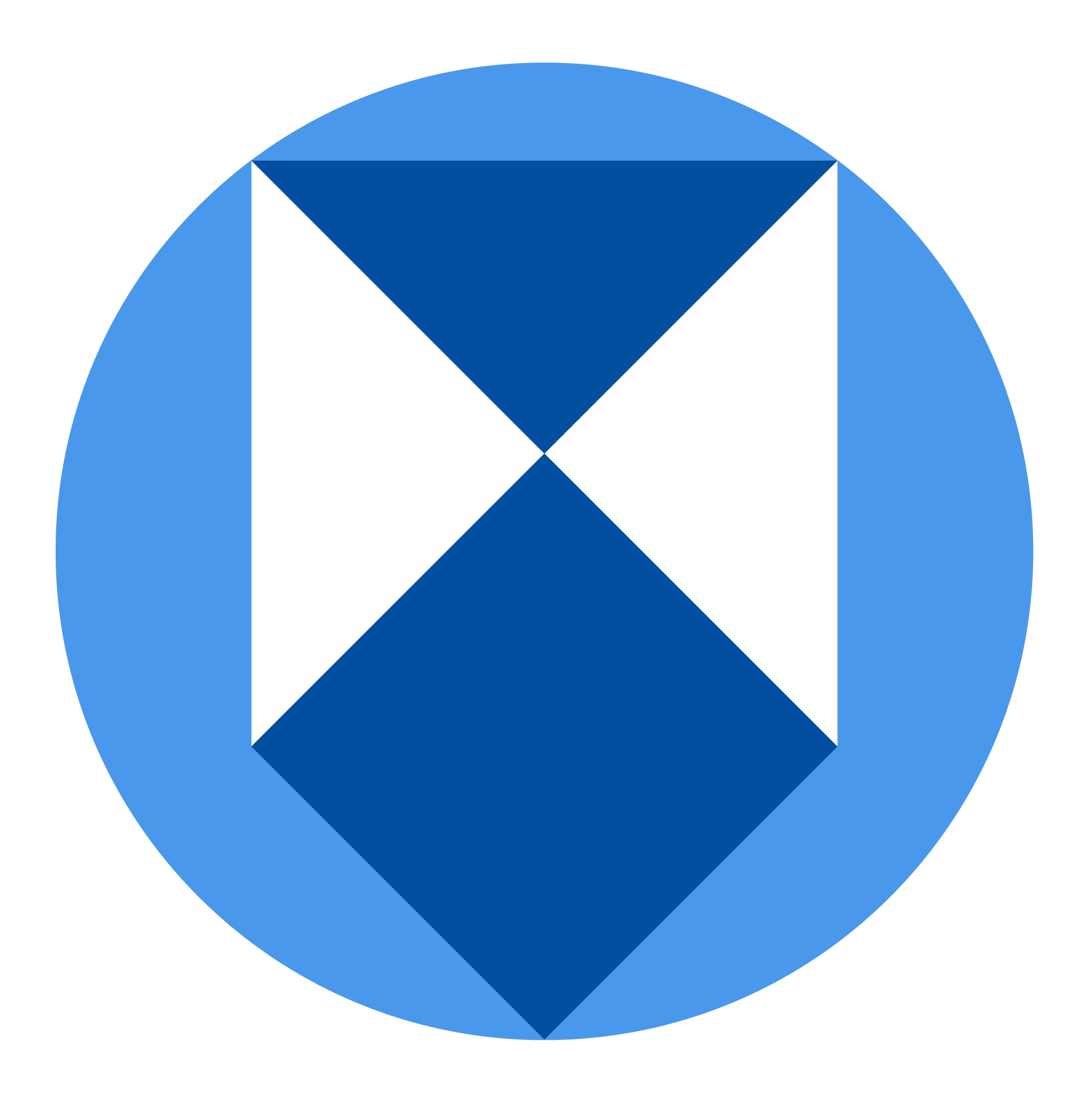
The Blue Shield logo was adopted in 2018 by the Blue Shield International Board, after the merger of ICBS and ANCBS. It represents the Blue Shield International Board and officially registered national committees of the Blue Shield across the world.

ICBS adopted the emblem of the 1954 Hague Convention that designates cultural property that should be protected, and for identification of those working to protect it – the blue shield. The cultural emblem is a protective symbol used during armed conflicts, and its use is restricted under international law. In order to avoid confusion with the emblem, the ANCBS adopted a new symbol - they took up the emblem of the Convention as a symbol of their protective work, but lightened the royal blue, and set it in a cyan blue circular background. The strapline of ANCBS was "Protecting The World's Cultural Heritage During Emergency Situations".

When ICBS and ANCBS merged in 2016, the decision was taken to re-brand to symbolise the new Blue Shield organisation. In 2018, a new logo was formally adopted by the Blue Shield International Board. The Blue Shield logo is the royal blue shield emblem of the 1954 Hague Convention, set within a mid-blue circle, symbolising both Blue Shield's roots and focus on the Hague Convention and armed conflict, and the wider remit it encompasses today. As part of the rebranding, the Blue Shield changed its strapline to "Protecting Heritage in Crisis".

The Blue Shield logo is used as a visible sign to indicate the Blue Shield International Board and shows the officially registered national committees of the Blue Shield across the world. It should be used to raise the visibility of the name and logo of the Blue Shield organisation by linking its name and organisation to activities of those it works with.

== See also ==
- Cultural heritage
- Cultural heritage management
- Intangible cultural heritage
- Material culture
- UNESCO
- UNESCO Intangible Cultural Heritage Lists
- United Nations
- United Nations peacekeeping
- World Heritage Site
