= List of acts of the Parliament of South Africa =

This is a list of acts enacted by the Parliament of South Africa from its establishment in 1910 to the present.

- List of acts of the Parliament of South Africa, 1910–1919
- List of acts of the Parliament of South Africa, 1920–1929
- List of acts of the Parliament of South Africa, 1930–1939
- List of acts of the Parliament of South Africa, 1940–1949
- List of acts of the Parliament of South Africa, 1950–1959
- List of acts of the Parliament of South Africa, 1960–1969
- List of acts of the Parliament of South Africa, 1970–1979
- List of acts of the Parliament of South Africa, 1980–1989
- List of acts of the Parliament of South Africa, 1990–1999
- List of acts of the Parliament of South Africa, 2000–2009
- List of acts of the Parliament of South Africa, 2010–2019
- List of acts of the Parliament of South Africa, 2020–2029
