= List of acts of the Parliament of South Africa, 2010–2019 =

This is a list of acts of the Parliament of South Africa enacted in the years 2010 to 2019.

South African acts are uniquely identified by the year of passage and an act number within that year.

== 2010 ==
| Act no. | Short title |
|---|---|
| 1 | Division of Revenue Act, 2010 |
| 2 | Safety at Sports and Recreational Events Act, 2010 |
| 3 | Appropriation Act, 2010 |
| 4 | South African Reserve Bank Amendment Act, 2010 |
| 5 | Social Assistance Amendment Act, 2010 |
| 6 | Criminal Law (Forensic Procedures) Amendment Act, 2010 |
| 7 | Taxation Laws Amendment Act, 2010 |
| 8 | Voluntary Disclosure Programme and Taxation Laws Second Amendment Act, 2010 |
| 9 | South African Postbank Limited Act, 2010 |
| 10 | Transport Laws Repeal Act, 2010 |
| 11 | Sectional Titles Amendment Act, 2010 |
| 12 | Deeds Registries Amendment Act, 2010 |
| 13 | Black Authorities Act Repeal Act, 2010 |
| 14 | Local Government: Municipal Electoral Amendment Act, 2010 |
| 15 | Division of Revenue Amendment Act, 2010 |
| 16 | Geoscience Amendment Act, 2010 |
| 17 | South African Citizenship Amendment Act, 2010 |
| 18 | Births and Deaths Registration Amendment Act, 2010 |
| 19 | Magistrates' Courts Amendment Act, 2010 |
| 20 | Repeal of the Black Administration Act and Amendment of Certain Laws Amendment Act, 2010 |
| 21 | Regulation of Interception of Communications and Provision of Communication-related Information Amendment Act, 2010 |
| 22 | Defence Amendment Act, 2010 |
| 23 | Adjustments Appropriation Act, 2010 |
| 24 | Skills Development Levies Amendment Act, 2010 |
| 25 | Higher Education and Training Laws Amendment Act, 2010 |
| 26 | Higher Education Laws Amendment Act, 2010 |

== 2011 ==
| Act no. | Short title |
|---|---|
| 1 | Independent Police Investigative Directorate Act, 2011 |
| 2 | Civilian Secretariat for Police Service Act, 2011 |
| 3 | Companies Amendment Act, 2011 |
| 4 | Rural Development and Land Reform General Amendment Act, 2011 |
| 5 | Correctional Matters Amendment Act, 2011 |
| 6 | Division of Revenue Act, 2011 |
| 7 | Local Government: Municipal Systems Amendment Act, 2011 |
| 8 | Sectional Titles Schemes Management Act, 2011 |
| 9 | Community Schemes Ombud Service Act, 2011 |
| 10 | Merchant Shipping (Safe Containers Convention) Act, 2011 |
| 11 | Appropriation Act, 2011 |
| 12 | Refugees Amendment Act, 2011 |
| 13 | Immigration Amendment Act, 2011 |
| 14 | State Liability Amendment Act, 2011 |
| 15 | Basic Education Laws Amendment Act, 2011 |
| 16 | Science and Technology Laws Amendment Act, 2011 |
| 17 | Protection from Harassment Act, 2011 |
| 18 | Military Veterans Act, 2011 |
| 19 | Government Employees Pension Law Amendment Act, 2011 |
| 20 | Division of Revenue Amendment Act, 2011 |
| 21 | Higher Education Laws Amendment Act, 2011 |
| 22 | South African Post Office SOC Ltd Act, 2011 |
| 23 | Adjustments Appropriation Act, 2011 |
| 24 | Taxation Laws Amendment Act, 2011 |
| 25 | Taxation Laws Second Amendment Act, 2011 |

== 2012 ==
| Act no. | Short title |
|---|---|
| | Constitution Seventeenth Amendment Act of 2012 |
| 1 | Additional Adjustments Appropriation Act (2011/12 Financial Year), 2012 |
| 2 | Finance Act, 2012 |
| 3 | Further Education and Training Colleges Amendment Act, 2012 |
| 4 | Military Ombud Act, 2012 |
| 5 | Division of Revenue Act, 2012 |
| 6 | Criminal Law (Sexual Offences and Related Matters) Amendment Act Amendment Act, 2012 |
| 7 | Appropriation Act, 2012 |
| 8 | Implementation of the Geneva Conventions Act, 2012 |
| 9 | Criminal Procedure Amendment Act, 2012 |
| 10 | South African Police Service Amendment Act, 2012 |
| 11 | Judicial Matters Amendment Act, 2012 |
| 12 | Use of Official Languages Act, 2012 |
| 13 | Rates and Monetary Amounts and Amendment of Revenue Laws Act, 2012 |
| 14 | Sheriffs Amendment Act, 2012 |
| 15 | Road Accident Fund (Transitional Provisions) Act, 2012 |
| 16 | Veterinary and Para-Veterinary Professions Amendment Act, 2012 |
| 17 | Adjustments Appropriation Act, 2012 |
| 18 | Division of Revenue Amendment Act, 2012 |
| 19 | Financial Markets Act, 2012 |
| 20 | Repeal of the Black Administration Act and Amendment of Certain Laws Amendment Act, 2012 |
| 21 | Tax Administration Laws Amendment Act, 2012 |
| 22 | Taxation Laws Amendment Act, 2012 |
| 23 | Higher Education and Training Laws Amendment Act, 2012 |
| 24 | Credit Rating Services Act, 2012 |

== 2013 ==
| Act no. | Short title |
|---|---|
| 1 | Further Education and Training Colleges Amendment Act, 2013 |
| 2 | Division of Revenue Act, 2013 |
| 3 | Transport Laws and Related Matters Amendment Act, 2013 |
| 4 | Protection of Personal Information Act, 2013 |
| 5 | South African Maritime and Aeronautical Search and Rescue Amendment Act, 2013 |
| 6 | Co-operatives Amendment Act, 2013 |
| 7 | Prevention and Combating of Trafficking in Persons Act, 2013 |
| 8 | Criminal Procedure Amendment Act, 2013 |
| 9 | Appropriation Act, 2013 |
| 10 | Superior Courts Act, 2013 |
| 11 | General Intelligence Laws Amendment Act, 2013 |
| 12 | National Health Amendment Act, 2013 |
| 13 | Prevention and Combating of Torture of Persons Act, 2013 |
| 14 | National Environmental Management Laws Amendment Act, 2013 |
| 15 | Dangerous Weapons Act, 2013 |
| 16 | Spatial Planning and Land Use Management Act, 2013 |
| 17 | Commission on Gender Equality Amendment Act, 2013 |
| 18 | Electoral Amendment Act, 2013 |
| 19 | Geomatics Profession Act, 2013 |
| 20 | Basic Conditions of Employment Amendment Act, 2013 |
| 21 | Africa Institute of South Africa Act Repeal Act, 2013 |
| 22 | Banks Amendment Act, 2013 |
| 23 | Rates and Monetary Amounts and Amendment of Revenue Laws Act, 2013 |
| 24 | Merchant Shipping (International Oil Pollution Compensation Fund) Act, 2013 |
| 25 | Merchant Shipping (Civil Liability Convention) Act, 2013 |
| 26 | Employment Tax Incentive Act, 2013 |
| 27 | Adjustments Appropriation Act, 2013 |
| 28 | Intellectual Property Laws Amendment Act, 2013 |
| 29 | Division of Revenue Amendment Act, 2013 |
| 30 | National Environmental Management Laws Second Amendment Act, 2013 |
| 31 | Taxation Laws Amendment Act, 2013 |
| 32 | Lotteries Amendment Act, 2013 |
| 33 | Sectional Titles Amendment Act, 2013 |
| 34 | Deeds Registries Amendment Act, 2013 |
| 35 | Merchant Shipping (International Oil Pollution Compensation Fund) Administration Act, 2013 |
| 36 | Merchant Shipping (International Oil Pollution Compensation Fund) Contributions Act, 2013 |
| 37 | Criminal Law (Forensic Procedures) Amendment Act, 2013 |
| 38 | South African Post Office SOC Ltd Amendment Act, 2013 |
| 39 | Tax Administration Laws Amendment Act, 2013 |
| 40 | South African Human Rights Commission Act, 2013 |
| 42 | Judicial Matters Amendment Act, 2013 |
| 43 | Judicial Matters Second Amendment Act, 2013 |
| 44 | South African Postbank Limited Amendment Act, 2013 |
| 45 | Financial Services Laws General Amendment Act, 2013 |
| 46 | Broad-Based Black Economic Empowerment Amendment Act, 2013 |
| 47 | Employment Equity Amendment Act, 2013 |
| 48 | South African Weather Service Amendment Act, 2013 |

== 2014 ==
| Act no. | Short title |
|---|---|
| 1 | Electronic Communications Amendment Act, 2014 |
| 2 | Independent Communications Authority of South Africa Amendment Act, 2014 |
| 3 | Tourism Act, 2014 |
| 4 | Employment Services Act, 2014 |
| 5 | Marine Living Resources Amendment Act, 2014 |
| 6 | Labour Relations Amendment Act, 2014 |
| 7 | Science and Technology Laws Amendment Act, 2014 |
| 8 | South African Language Practitioners' Council Act, 2014 |
| 9 | Legal Metrology Act, 2014 |
| 10 | Division of Revenue Act, 2014 |
| 11 | Public Administration Management Act. 2014 |
| 12 | Mental Health Care Amendment Act, 2014 |
| 13 | State Attorney Amendment Act, 2014 |
| 14 | Judicial Matters Amendment Act, 2014 |
| 15 | Restitution of Land Rights Amendment Act, 2014 |
| 16 | Special Economic Zones Act, 2014 |
| 17 | Property Valuation Act, 2014 |
| 18 | Private Security Industry Regulation Amendment Act, 2014 |
| 19 | National Credit Amendment Act, 2014 |
| 20 | National Environmental Management: Air Quality Amendment Act, 2014 |
| 21 | National Environmental Management: Protected Areas Amendment Act, 2014 |
| 22 | Determination of Remuneration of Office-bearers of Independent Constitutional Institutions Laws Amendment Act, 2014 |
| 23 | Infrastructure Development Act, 2014 |
| 25 | National Environmental Management Laws Amendment Act, 2014 |
| 26 | National Environmental Management: Waste Amendment Act, 2014 |
| 27 | National Water Amendment Act, 2014 |
| 28 | Legal Practice Act, 2014 |
| 29 | Local Government: Municipal Property Rates Amendment Act, 2014 |
| 30 | Customs Duty Act, 2014 |
| 31 | Customs Control Act, 2014 |
| 32 | Customs and Excise Amendment Act, 2014 |
| 33 | Appropriation Act, 2014 |
| 34 | Financial Management of Parliament Amendment Act, 2014 |
| 35 | Rental Housing Amendment Act, 2014 |
| 36 | National Environmental Management: Integrated Coastal Management Amendment Act, 2014 |
| 37 | Adjustments Appropriation Act, 2014 |
| 38 | Division of Revenue Amendment Act, 2014 |
| 39 | Legal Aid South Africa Act, 2014 |
| 40 | Attorneys Amendment Act, 2014 |
| 41 | Development Bank of Southern Africa Amendment Act, 2014 |
| 42 | Rates and Monetary Amounts and Amendment of Revenue Laws Act, 2014 |
| 43 | Taxation Laws Amendment Act, 2014 |
| 44 | Tax Administration Laws Amendment Act, 2014 |

== 2015 ==
| Act no. | Short title |
|---|---|
| 1 | Division of Revenue Act, 2015 |
| 2 | Auditing Profession Amendment Act, 2015 |
| 3 | Banks Amendment Act, 2015 |
| 4 | Financial and Fiscal Commission Amendment Act, 2015 |
| 5 | Criminal Law (Sexual Offences and Related Matters) Amendment Act Amendment Act, 2015 |
| 6 | Eskom Subordinated Loan Special Appropriation Amendment Act (2008/09-2010/11 Financial Years), 2015 |
| 7 | Eskom Special Appropriation Act, 2015 |
| 8 | Appropriation Act, 2015 |
| 9 | Maintenance Amendment Act, 2015 |
| 10 | Refugees Amendment Act, 2015 |
| 11 | Agrément South Africa Act, 2015 |
| 12 | Merchant Shipping Amendment Act, 2015 |
| 13 | Rates and Monetary Amounts and Amendment of Revenue Laws Act, 2015 |
| 14 | Medicines and Related Substances Amendment Act, 2015 |
| 15 | Division of Revenue Amendment Act, 2015 |
| 16 | Disaster Management Amendment Act, 2015 |
| 17 | Defence Laws Repeal and Amendment Act, 2015 |
| 18 | Criminal Matters Amendment Act, 2015 |
| 19 | Finance Act, 2015 |
| 20 | New Development Bank Special Appropriation Act, 2015 |
| 21 | Adjustments Appropriation Act, 2015 |
| 22 | Protection of Investment Act, 2015 |
| 23 | Tax Administration Laws Amendment Act, 2015 |
| 24 | Judicial Matters Amendment Act, 2015 |
| 25 | Taxation Laws Amendment Act, 2015 |

== 2016 ==
| Act no. | Short title |
|---|---|
| 1 | Local Government: Municipal Electoral Amendment Act, 2016 |
| 2 | Revenue Laws Amendment Act, 2016 |
| 3 | Division of Revenue Act, 2016 |
| 4 | Performing Animals Protection Amendment Act, 2016 |
| 5 | No act by this number |
| 6 | Appropriation Act, 2016 |
| 7 | Finance Act, 2016 |
| 8 | Immigration Amendment Act, 2016 |
| 9 | Higher Education Amendment Act, 2016 |
| 10 | Unemployment Insurance Amendment Act, 2016 |
| 11 | Division of Revenue Amendment Act, 2016 |
| 12 | Adjustments Appropriation Act, 2016 |
| 13 | Rates and Monetary Amounts and Amendment of Revenue Laws Act, 2016 |
| 14 | Rates and Monetary Amounts and Amendment of Revenue Laws (Administration) Act, 2016 |
| 15 | Taxation Laws Amendment Act, 2016 |
| 16 | Tax Administration Laws Amendment Act, 2016 |
| 17 | Children's Amendment Act, 2016 |
| 18 | Children's Second Amendment Act, 2016 |

== 2017 ==
| Act no. | Short title |
|---|---|
| 1 | Financial Intelligence Centre Amendment Act, 2017 |
| 2 | Justice Administered Fund Act, 2017 |
| 3 | Division of Revenue Act, 2017 |
| 4 | Criminal Procedure Amendment Act, 2017 |
| 5 | Protected Disclosures Amendment Act, 2017 |
| 6 | Appropriation Act, 2017 |
| 7 | Courts of Law Amendment Act, 2017 |
| 8 | Judicial Matters Amendment Act, 2017 |
| 9 | Financial Sector Regulation Act, 2017 |
| 10 | Division of Revenue Amendment Act, 2017 |
| 11 | Refugees Amendment Act, 2017 |
| 12 | Adjustments Appropriation Act, 2017 |
| 13 | Tax Administration Laws Amendment Act, 2017 |
| 14 | Rates and Monetary Amounts and Amendment of Revenue Laws Act, 2017 |
| 15 | International Arbitration Act, 2017 |
| 16 | Legal Practice Amendment Act, 2017 |
| 17 | Taxation Laws Amendment Act, 2017 |
| 18 | Insurance Act, 2017 |

== 2018 ==
| Act no. | Short title |
|---|---|
| 1 | Division of Revenue Act, 2018 |
| 2 | Extension of Security of Tenure Amendment Act, 2018 |
| 3 | No act by this number |
| 4 | Appropriation Act, 2018 |
| 5 | Public Audit Amendment Act, 2018 |
| 6 | Political Party Funding Act, 2018 |
| 7 | Basic Conditions of Employment Amendment Act, 2018 |
| 8 | Labour Relations Amendment Act, 2018 |
| 9 | National Minimum Wage Act, 2018 |
| 10 | Labour Laws Amendment Act, 2018 |
| 11 | Plant Improvement Act, 2018 |
| 12 | Plant Breeders' Rights Act, 2018 |
| 13 | Money Bills Amendment Procedure and Related Matters Amendment Act, 2018 |
| 14 | Division of Revenue Amendment Act, 2018 |
| 15 | Special Appropriation Act, 2018 |
| 16 | Marine Spatial Planning Act, 2018 |
| 17 | Adjustments Appropriation Act, 2018 |
| 18 | Competition Amendment Act, 2018 |
| 19 | National Research Foundation Amendment Act, 2018 |
| 20 | No act by this number |
| 21 | Rates and Monetary Amounts and Amendment of Revenue Laws Act, 2018 |
| 22 | Tax Administration Laws Amendment Act, 2018 |
| 23 | Taxation Laws Amendment Act, 2018 |

== 2019 ==
| Act no. | Short title |
|---|---|
| 1 | Electoral Laws Amendment Act, 2019 |
| 2 | Traditional Leadership and Governance Framework Amendment Act, 2019 |
| 3 | Traditional and Khoi-San Leadership Act, 2019 |
| 4 | Administrative Adjudication of Road Traffic Offences Amendment Act, 2019 |
| 5 | National Health Laboratory Service Amendment Act, 2019 |
| 6 | Protection, Promotion, Development and Management of Indigenous Knowledge Act, 2019 |
| 7 | National Credit Amendment Act, 2019 |
| 8 | Critical Infrastructure Protection Act, 2019 |
| 9 | Powers, Privileges and Immunities of Parliament and Provincial Legislatures Amendment Act, 2019 |
| 10 | Public Service Commission Amendment Act, 2019 |
| 11 | Films and Publications Amendment Act, 2019 |
| 12 | National Qualifications Framework Amendment Act, 2019 |
| 13 | Customs and Excise Amendment Act, 2019 |
| 14 | Public Investment Corporation Amendment Act, 2019 |
| 15 | Carbon Tax Act, 2019 |
| 16 | Division of Revenue Act, 2019 |
| 17 | No act by this number |
| 18 | Financial Matters Amendment Act, 2019 |
| 19 | Electronic Deeds Registration Systems Act, 2019 |
| 20 | Public Audit Excess Fee Act, 2019 |
| 21 | No act by this number |
| 22 | Property Practitioners Act, 2019 |
| 23 | Overvaal Resorts Limited Act Repeal Act, 2019 |
| 24 | Appropriation Act, 2019 |
| 25 | Special Appropriation Act, 2019 |
| 26 | Foreign Service Act, 2019 |
| 27 | Independent Police Investigative Directorate Amendment Act, 2019 |
| 28 | Child Justice Amendment Act, 2019 |
| 29 | Adjustments Appropriation Act, 2019 |
| 30 | Division of Revenue Amendment Act, 2019 |
| 31 | No act by this number |
| 32 | Rates and Monetary Amounts and Amendment of Revenue Laws Act, 2019 |
| 33 | Tax Administration Laws Amendment Act, 2019 |
| 34 | Taxation Laws Amendment Act, 2019 |
| 35 | Hydrographic Act, 2019 |
