= National Land Transport Act, 2009 =

Legislative framework in South Africa

The National Land Transport Act, 2009 is a legislative framework enacted in South Africa to regulate and oversee the development, restructuring, and management of the national land transport system. Signed by the President on 3 April 2009 and published in the Government Gazette on 8 April 2009, the Act aims to consolidate the functions of land transport governance, establish institutional structures, and guide transport policy across the national, provincial, and municipal spheres of government.

== Purpose ==
The Act serves to:

- Advance the transformation and restructuring of the national transport system initiated by the National Land Transport Transition Act, 2000.
- Provide national principles, requirements, and frameworks for uniform application across provinces.
- Consolidate land transport functions at the appropriate government levels.
- Promote sustainable and integrated land transport systems that align with broader developmental and environmental goals.

== Key provisions ==
=== Governance and institutional roles ===
The Act defines the responsibilities of the three spheres of government:

- National Government: Formulates transport policy, coordinates inter-provincial transport, regulates tourist and interprovincial transport, and provides funding for municipal transport systems.
- Provincial Governments: Develops provincial transport frameworks, oversees municipal transport functions, and ensures coordination between municipalities.
- Municipal Governments: Prepares integrated transport plans, manages transport infrastructure, and regulates local operating licences.

=== Transport planning ===
The Act integrates transport planning with land use and development. Key components include:

- National Land Transport Strategic Framework (NLTSF): A five-year strategy guiding national transport planning.
- Provincial Land Transport Frameworks (PLTFs): Comprehensive transport plans for each province.
- Integrated Transport Plans (ITPs): Localised transport plans developed by municipalities.

=== Regulation of public transport ===
The Act introduces measures to regulate road-based public transport, including operating licences for minibus taxis, buses, and metered taxis. It also mandates the establishment of transport regulators at national, provincial, and municipal levels to oversee licensing and compliance.

=== Funding mechanisms ===
The Act provides for the establishment of Municipal Land Transport Funds to finance public transport infrastructure, operations, and maintenance. User charges and public-private partnerships are encouraged to supplement government funding.

=== Accessibility and inclusivity ===
A core aim of the Act is to ensure accessibility for persons with disabilities and other vulnerable groups. It mandates that public transport systems be designed to accommodate diverse user needs.

== See also ==
- National Land Transport Amendment Act, 2023
- Acts of the Parliament of South Africa
