= List of acts of the Parliament of South Africa, 1910–1919 =

This is a list of acts of the Parliament of South Africa enacted in the years 1910 to 1919.

South African acts are uniquely identified by the year of passage and an act number within that year. Some acts have gone by more than one short title in the course of their existence; in such cases each title is listed with the years in which it applied.

The National Archives of the United Kingdom hold copies of the Acts from 1910 - 1925 in TNA Catalogue ref: CO 632. Correspondence relating to the Acts can also be found in the Original Correspondence, TNA Catalogue ref: CO 551.

The South Africa Act, 1909, which created the Union of South Africa, is often listed with the acts of the Parliament of South Africa although it was enacted by the Parliament of the United Kingdom.

== 1910 ==
Act no.	Short title
1	Crown Liabilities Act, 1910
2	Census Act, 1910
3	Public Holidays Act, 1910
4	Naturalization of Aliens Act, 1910
5	Interpretation Act, 1910
6	Mining Taxation Act, 1910
7	Appropriation (1910–1911) Act, 1910
8	Railways and Harbours Appropriation Act, 1910
9	Rhodes' Will (Groote Schuur Devolution) Act, 1910
10	Patents Amendment (Natal and Orange Free State) Act, 1910
11	Cape Province Cattle Cleansing Act, 1910

== 1911 ==
Act no.	Short title
1	Appellate Division Further Jurisdiction Act, 1911
2	Crown Land Disposal (Execution of Deeds) Act, 1911
3	High Commissioner's Act, 1911
4	South African College Act, 1911
5	Additional Appropriation (1910–1911) Act, 1911
6	Appropriation (Part) Act, 1911
7	Railways and Harbours Appropriation (Part) Act, 1911
8	Explosives Act, 1911
9	Habitual Criminals Act, 1911
10	Post Office Administration and Shipping Combinations Discouragement Act, 1911
11	Agricultural Pests Act, 1911
12	Mines and Works Act, 1911
13	Prisons and Reformatories Act, 1911
14	Diseases of Stock Act, 1911
15	Native Labour Regulation Act, 1911 (before 1964); Bantu Labour Regulation Act, 1911 (after 1964)
16	Cigarette Excise and Surtax Act, 1911
17	General Loans Act, 1911
18	Public Debt Commissioners Act, 1911
19	Powers and Privileges of Parliament Act, 1911
20	Dipping Tanks (Advances) Act, 1911
21	Exchequer and Audit Act, 1911
22	Bushman-Relics Protection Act, 1911
23	Dutch Reformed Churches Union Act, 1911
24	Appropriation (1911–1912) Act, 1911
25	Railways and Harbours Additional Appropriation (1910–1911) Act, 1911
26	Natal Poll Tax Act, 1905, Amendment Act, 1911
27	Railways and Harbours Appropriation (1911–1912) Act, 1911
28	Loans Appropriation (1910–1912) Act, 1911
29	Public Works Loan and Floating Debt Consolidation Act, 1911
30	Stamp Duties and Fees Act, 1911
31	Railways and Harbours Capital and Betterment Works Appropriation (1910–1912) Act, 1911
32	Anatomy Act, 1911
33	Railways Construction Act, 1911
34	Miners' Phthisis Allowances Act, 1911

== 1912 ==
Act no.	Short title
1	Natal Native Trust and Native Administration Amendment Act, 1912
2	Railways and Harbours Appropriation (Part) Act, 1912
3	Appropriation (Part) Act, 1912
4	Additional Appropriation (1910–1912) Act, 1912
5	Oliphants River (Van Rhynsdorp) Canal Act, 1912
6	Gill College Corporation Private Act, 1912
7	Natal Bank (Limited) Laws 1888 to 1912 Private Act, 1912
8	Irrigation and Conservation of Waters Act, 1912
9	Second Appropriation (Part) Act, 1912
10	Second Railways and Harbours Appropriation (Part) Act, 1912
11	Unauthorized Expenditure (1910–1911) Act, 1912
12	Land Settlement Act, 1912
13	South Africa Defence Act, 1912
14	Police Act, 1912
15	Transvaal and Orange Free State Land Settlements Amendment Act, 1912
16	Judges' Salaries and Pensions Act, 1912
17	Fencing Act, 1912
18	Land Bank Act, 1912
19	Miners' Phthisis Act, 1912
20	Private Bill Procedure Act, 1912
21	Appropriation (1912–1913) Act, 1912
22	Railways and Harbours Appropriation (1912–1913) Act, 1912
23	Railways and Harbours Capital and Betterment Works Appropriation (1912–1913) Act, 1912
24	Loan Appropriation (1912–1913) Act, 1912
25	Railways and Harbours Unauthorized Expenditure (1910–1911) Act, 1912
26	Railways and Harbours Additional Appropriation (1911–1912) Act, 1912
27	Administration of Justice Act, 1912
28	Railways and Harbours Service Act, 1912
29	Public Service and Pensions Act, 1912
30	Railways and Harbours Capital and Betterment Works Additional Appropriation (1910–1912) Act, 1912

== 1913 ==
Act no.	Short title
1	Appropriation (Part) Act, 1913
2	Additional Appropriation (1912–1913) Act, 1913
3	Railways and Harbours Appropriation (Part) Act, 1913
4	Railways and Harbours Additional Appropriation (1912–1913) Act, 1913
5	Railways and Harbours Capital and Betterment Works Additional Appropriation (1912–1913) Act, 1913
6	Trustee Investment in Union Government Securities Act, 1913
7	Excise (Proposed Duties Procedure) Act, 1913
8	Natal Poll Tax Further Suspension Act, 1913
9	Customs Management Act, 1913
10	Financial Relations Act, 1913
11	Transfer Duty Reduction Act, 1913
12	Maclear and Elliot Districts Further Provision Act, 1913
13	Second Railways and Harbours Appropriation (Part) Act, 1913
14	Dipping Tanks Further Provision Act, 1913
15	Wine, Spirits and Vinegar Act, 1913
16	Forest Act, 1913
17	Railways and Harbours Unauthorized Expenditure (1911–1912) Act, 1913
18	Transvaal Precious and Base Metals Act Amendment Act, 1913
19	Carnarvon Outer Commonage Settlement Act, 1913
20	Marriage Laws Amendment Act, 1913
21	Unauthorized Expenditure (1911–1912) Act, 1913
22	Immigrants Regulation Act, 1913 (before 1961); Admission of Persons to the Union Regulation Act, 1913 (after 1961)
23	Railways Construction Act, 1913
24	Administration of Estates Act, 1913
25	Children's Protection Act, 1913
26	New Fiscal Divisions (Cape) Act, 1913
27	Natives Land Act, 1913 (before 1964); Bantu Land Act, 1913 (from 1964 to 1978); Black Land Act, 1913 (after 1978)
28	Appropriation (1913–1914) Act, 1913
29	North Barrow and Weenen Commonages Amendment Act, 1913
30	Bills of Exchange (Non-Business Days) Act, 1913
31	Stamp Duties and Fees Amendment Act, 1913
32	Railways and Harbours Appropriation (1913–1914) Act, 1913
33	Public Works Loan Act, 1913
34	Loan Appropriation (1913–1914) Act, 1913
35	Railways and Harbours Capital and Betterment Works Appropriation (1913–1914) Act, 1913
36	Pensions (Supplementary) Act, 1913
37	Excise and Customs Tariffs Amendment Act, 1913
38	Loan Redemption (1910–1911) Validation Act, 1913

== 1914 ==
Act no.	Short title
1	Indemnity and Undesirables Special Deportation Act, 1914
2	Appropriation (Part) Act, 1914
3	Railways and Harbours Appropriation (Part) Act, 1914
4	Additional Appropriation (1913–1914) Act, 1914
5	Railways and Harbours Additional Appropriation (1913–1914) Act, 1914
6	Railways and Harbours (Application of Moneys 1912–1913) Validation Act, 1914
7	Railways and Harbours Strike and Service Amendment Act, 1914
8	Prevention of Cruelty to Animals Act, 1914
9	Prescription Further Amendment Act (Transvaal), 1914
10	Cape Liquor Licensing Courts (Constitution) Amendment Act, 1914
11	Natal Public Health Acts (Re-enactment and Amendment) Act, 1914
12	Unauthorized Expenditure (1912–1913) Act, 1914
13	Matches Duty Act, 1914
14	Lunacy and Leprosy Laws Amendment Act, 1914
15	Workmen's Wages Protection Act, 1914
16	Justices of the Peace and Oaths Act, 1914
17	Fruit Export Act, 1914
18	The Rand Water Board Supplementary Water Supply (Private) Act, 1914
19	Second Appropriation (Part) Act, 1914
20	Second Railways and Harbours Appropriation (Part) Act, 1914
21	Co-operative Agricultural Societies (Transvaal and Orange Free State) Amendment Act, 1914
22	Indians Relief Act, 1914
23	Wharfage and Light Dues Act, 1914
24	Railways and Harbours Unauthorized Expenditure (1912–1913) Act, 1914
25	Workmen's Compensation Act, 1914
26	Customs Tariff Act, 1914
27	Riotous Assemblies and Criminal Law Amendment Act, 1914
28	Income Tax Act, 1914
29	Miners' Phthisis Act Amendment Act, 1914
30	Natal Poll Tax Further Suspension Act, 1914
31	Appropriation (1914–1915) Act, 1914
32	Hartebeestpoort Irrigation Scheme (Crocodile River) Act, 1914
33	Borrowing Powers and General Loans Act Amendment Act, 1914
34	Railways and Harbours Appropriation (1914–1915) Act, 1914
35	Loan Appropriation (1914–1915) Act, 1914
36	Railways and Harbours Capital and Betterment Works Appropriation (1914–1915) Act, 1914
37	Pensions (Supplementary) Act, 1914
38	Statistics Act, 1914
39	Public Service and Pensions Act Amendment Act, 1914
40	Criminal Justice Administration Act, 1914

== 1914 Special Session ==
Act no.	Short title
1	Public Welfare and Moratorium Act, 1914
2	Prieska–Upington Railway Construction Act, 1914
3	Additional Loan Appropriation (1914–1915) Act, 1914
4	Currency Act, 1914

== 1915 ==
Act no.	Short title
1	Appropriation (Part) Act, 1915
2	Railways and Harbours Appropriation (Part) Act, 1915
3	Additional Appropriation (1914–1915) Act, 1915
4	Railways and Harbours Capital and Betterment Works Additional Appropriation (1914–1915) Act, 1915
5	Railways and Harbours Additional Appropriation (1914–1915) Act, 1915
6	Railways and Harbours Capital and Betterment Works Appropriation (1915–1916) Act, 1915
7	Hlobane Railway Amendment Act, 1915
8	Railways and Harbours Appropriation (1915–1916) Act, 1915
9	Loan Appropriation (1915–1916) Act, 1915
10	Removal of Disabilities (War and Rebellion) Act, 1915
11	Indemnity and Special Tribunals Act, 1915
12	University of the Cape of Good Hope (Council) Act, 1915
13	Railways and Harbours (Appointment of Commissioners) Act, 1915
14	Appropriation (1915–1916) Act, 1915
15	The Imperial Cold Storage and Supply Company, Limited, Railway (Private) Act, 1915
16	South African Mutual Life Assurance Society Private Act, 1915
17	Dipping Tanks Further Provision (Natives) Act, 1915 (before 1964); Dipping Tanks Further Provision (Bantu) Act, 1915 (from 1964 to 1978); Dipping Tanks Further Provision (Blacks) Act, 1915 (after 1978)
18	Finance Act, 1915
19	War Stores (Commission) Act, 1915
20	Unauthorized Expenditure (1913–1914) Act, 1915
21	Railways and Harbours Unauthorized Expenditure (1913–1914) Act, 1915
22	Customs Amendment and Excise Duties Extension Act, 1915
23	Income Tax Act, 1915
24	Mining Taxation Amendment Act, 1915
25	Pensions (Supplementary) Act, 1915
26	Persons on Active Service Relief Act, 1915
27	Additional Loan Appropriation (1915–1916) Act, 1915

== 1916 ==
Act no.	Short title
1	Native Definition Amendment Act, 1916
2	Removal or Modification of Restrictions on Immovable Property Act, 1916
3	Girls' and Mentally Defective Women's Protection Act, 1916
4	Appropriation (Part) Act, 1916
5	Additional Appropriation (1915–1916) Act, 1916
6	Railways and Harbours Capital and Betterment Works Additional Appropriation (1915–1916) Act, 1916
7	Railways and Harbours Additional Appropriation (1915–1916) Act, 1916
8	Railways and Harbours Appropriation (Part) Act, 1916
9	Patents, Designs, Trade Marks and Copyright Act, 1916 (before 1953); Designs, Trade Marks and Copyright Act, 1916 (from 1953 to 1964); Designs and Copyright Act, 1916 (from 1964 to 1965); Designs Act, 1916 (after 1965)
10	Unauthorized Expenditure (1914–1915) Act, 1916
11	Transvaal Liquor Licensing Ordinance Amendment (Sale of Liquor) Act, 1916
12	University of South Africa Act, 1916
13	University of Stellenbosch Act, 1916
14	University of Cape Town Act, 1916
15	Public Service Commission Act, 1916
16	Transvaal and Orange Free State Land Settlements Act Further Amendment Act, 1916
17	Railway Board Act, 1916
18	Railways and Harbours Unauthorized Expenditure (1914–1915) Act, 1916
19	Local Stock (Registration) Act, 1916
20	Law Society (Cape of Good Hope) Private Act, 1916
21	Payment of Members of Parliament Act, 1916
22	Railways and Harbours Regulation, Control and Management Act, 1916
23	Second Appropriation (Part) Act, 1916
24	Legal Proceedings (Rebellion) Act, 1916
25	Diseases of Stock Act Amendment Act, 1916
26	Irrigation and Conservation of Waters Act 1912 Amendment Act, 1916
27	Second Railways and Harbours Appropriation (Part) Act, 1916
28	Drought and Flood Distress Relief Act, 1916
29	War Special Pensions Act, 1916
30	Land Bank Act 1912 Amendment Act, 1916
31	Exchequer and Audit Act, 1911, Amendment Act, 1916
32	Insolvency Act, 1916
33	Transvaal Liquor Licensing Laws Amendment Act, 1916
34	Special War Tax (Gold Mines) Act, 1916
35	Income Tax Act, 1916
36	Diamond Export Duty Act, 1916
37	Customs and Excise Duties Amendment Act, 1916
38	Mental Disorders Act, 1916
39	Trading with the Enemy Act, 1916
40	Mapochs Gronden Water and Commonage Act, 1916
41	Public Railways (Working and Closing) Act, 1916
42	Finance Act, 1916
43	Marriage Officers Act, 1916
44	Miners' Phthisis Act, 1916
45	Pensions (Supplementary) Act, 1916
46	Railways and Harbours Appropriation (1916–1917) Act, 1916
47	Railways and Harbours Capital and Betterment Works Appropriation (1916–1917) Act, 1916
48	Loan Appropriation (1916–1917) Act, 1916
49	Appropriation (1916–1917) Act, 1916

== 1917 ==
Act no.	Short title
1	Gubenxa and Embokotwa Titles Amendment Act, 1917
2	Additional Appropriation (1916–1917) Act, 1917
3	Railways and Harbours Capital and Betterment Works Additional Appropriation (1916–1917) Act, 1917
4	Railways and Harbours Additional Appropriation (1916–1917) Act, 1917
5	Appropriation (Part) Act, 1917
6	Railways and Harbours Appropriation (Part) Act, 1917
7	Banks Act, 1917
8	Lord's Day Act (Natal) Amendment Act, 1917
9	Financial Relations Act Extension Act, 1917
10	Cape Superior Courts Further Provision Act, 1917
11	Unauthorized Expenditure (1915–1916) Act, 1917
12	Railways and Harbours Unauthorized Expenditure (1915–1916) Act, 1917
13	Workmen's Compensation (Industrial Diseases) Act, 1917
14	Forest (Demarcation) Act, 1917
15	Second Railways and Harbours Appropriation (Part) Act, 1917
16	Second Appropriation (Part) Act, 1917
17	Co-operative Agricultural Societies (Transvaal and Orange Free State) Acts Further Amendment Act, 1917
18	Irrigation Works (Special Loans) Act, 1917
19	Sale of Agricultural Produce on Certain Mines Act, 1917
20	Higher Education Additional Provision Act, 1917
21	Fertilisers, Farm Foods, Seeds and Pest Remedies Act, 1917
22	General Loans Consolidation and Amendment Act, 1917
23	Land Settlement Act Amendment Act, 1917
24	Bewaarplaats Moneys Application Act, 1917
25	Land Surveyors Recognition Act, 1917
26	Telegraph Messages Protection Act, 1917
27	Diamond Export Duty Act, 1917
28	Oliphants River Irrigation Works Act, 1917
29	Railways and Harbours Appropriation (1917–1918) Act, 1917
30	Appropriation (1917–1918) Act, 1917
31	Criminal Procedure and Evidence Act, 1917
32	Magistrates' Courts Act, 1917
33	Railways and Harbours Service Act Amendment and Further Provision Act, 1917
34	Durban Harbour Works Construction Act, 1917
35	Agricultural Produce Export Act, 1917
36	Customs and Excise Duties Act, 1917
37	Public Welfare and Moratorium Act Amendment Act, 1917
38	Railways and Harbours Capital and Betterment Works Appropriation (1917–1918) Act, 1917
39	Loan Appropriation (1917–1918) Act, 1917
40	Pensions (Supplementary) Act, 1917
41	Income Tax (Consolidation) Act, 1917
42	Financial Adjustments Act, 1917
43	War Special Pensions Act, 1917
44	Miners' Phthisis Acts Amendment Act, 1917

== 1918 ==
Act no.	Short title
1	Additional Appropriation (1917–1918) Act, 1918
2	Special Justices of the Peace Act, 1918
3	Fugitive Offenders (Occupied Territories) Act, 1918
4	Prevention of Corruption Act, 1918
5	Railways and Harbours Additional Appropriation (1917–1918) Act, 1918
6	Commission's (Cost of Living) Powers Act, 1918
7	Appropriation (Part) Act, 1918
8	Railways and Harbours Unauthorized Expenditure (1916–1917) Act, 1918
9	Universities Acts Amendment Act, 1918
10	Unauthorized Expenditure (1916–1917) Act, 1918
11	Railways and Harbours Appropriation (Part) Act, 1918
12	Electoral Act, 1918
13	Deeds Registries Act, 1918
14	Public Service Commission Amendment Act, 1918
15	Electoral Census Further Provision Act, 1918
16	Dairy Industry Act, 1918
17	Wheat Conservation Act, 1918
18	Appropriation (1918–1919) Act, 1918
19	Loan Appropriation (1918–1919) Act, 1918
20	Customs and Excise Duties Act, 1918
21	Railways and Harbours Appropriation (1918–1919) Act, 1918
22	Railways and Harbours Capital and Betterment Works Appropriation (1918–1919) Act, 1918
23	Hartebeestpoort Irrigation Scheme (Acquisition of Land) Act, 1918
24	Miners' Phthisis Acts Further Amendment Act, 1918
25	War Special Pensions Act Amendment Act, 1918
26	Income Tax Act, 1918
27	Pensions (Supplementary) Act, 1918
28	Factories Act, 1918
29	Regulation of Wages, Apprentices and Improvers Act, 1918
30	Transvaal Mining Leases and Mineral Law Amendment Act, 1918
31	Electoral Divisions Redelimitation Amendment Act, 1918

== 1919 ==
Act no.	Short title
1	Additional Appropriation (1918–1919) Act, 1919
2	Railways and Harbours Additional Appropriation (1918–1919) Act, 1919
3	Railways and Harbours Capital and Betterment Works Additional Appropriation (1918–1919) Act, 1919
4	Marriage Registers and Certificates Act, 1919
5	Statistics Amendment Act, 1919
6	Crown Land Disposal (Cape of Good Hope) Amendment Act, 1919
7	Appropriation (Part) Act, 1919
8	Second Additional Appropriation (1918–1919) Act, 1919
9	Railways and Harbours Appropriation (Part) Act, 1919
10	Agricultural Pests (Citrus Canker) Act, 1919
11	Riparian Land (Erven and Commonages) Act, 1919
12	Inquests Act, 1919
13	The Bedford Additional Water Supply (Private) Act, 1919
14	Rand Mines Power Supply Company Water Supply (Private) Act, 1919
15	Precious Stones (Alluvial) Amendment Act, 1919
16	Unauthorized Expenditure (1917–1918) Act, 1919
17	Commonages (Cape of Good Hope) Act, 1919
18	Railways and Harbours Appropriation (1919–1920) Act, 1919
19	Railways and Harbours Unauthorized Expenditure (1917–1918) Act, 1919
20	General Loans Further Amendment Act, 1919
21	Medical Practitioners and Dentists Registration Amendment Act, 1919
22	Agricultural Holdings (Transvaal) Registration Act, 1919
23	Bills of Exchange (Time of Noting) Act, 1919
24	Messina Railway Amendment Act, 1919
25	Public Servants (Military Service) Act, 1919
26	Second Appropriation (Part) Act, 1919
27	Customs Management Act Amendment Act, 1919
28	Transvaal Transfer Duty Amendment Act, 1919
29	Co-operative Agricultural Societies Acts Amendment Act, 1919
30	Second Railways and Harbours Appropriation (1919–1920) Act, 1919
31	Railways and Harbours Capital and Betterment Works Appropriation (1919–1920) Act, 1919
32	Customs and Excise Duties Act, 1919
33	Transvaal Liquor Licensing Ordinance, 1902, Amendment Act, 1919
34	Diamond Export Duty Act Amendment Act, 1919
35	Loan Appropriation (1919–1920) Act, 1919
36	Public Health Act, 1919
37	Asiatics (Land and Trading) Amendment Act (Transvaal), 1919
38	Diamond Cutting Act, 1919
39	Income Tax (Consolidation) Act Amendment Act, 1919
40	Miners' Phthisis Act, 1919
41	Appropriation (1919–1920) Act, 1919
42	War Special Pensions Act, 1919
43	Financial Adjustments Act, 1919
44	Pensions (Supplementary) Act, 1919
45	Pretoria Mint Act, 1919
46	Amnesty and Indemnity and Undesirables Deportation Act, 1914, Amendment Act, 1919
47	Public Welfare and Moratorium Acts Extension and Further Amendment Act, 1919
48	Native Reserve Locations Acts (Cape of Good Hope) Further Amendment Act, 1919
49	Treaty of Peace and South West Africa Mandate Act, 1919
