= List of acts of the Parliament of South Africa, 2020–2029 =

This is a list of acts of the Parliament of South Africa for the years from 2020 to the present.

South African acts are uniquely identified by the year of passage and an act number within that year.

== 2020 ==
Act no.	Short title
1	National Public Health Institute of South Africa Act, 2020
2	Border Management Authority Act, 2020
3	National Minimum Wage Amendment Act, 2020
4	Division of Revenue Act, 2020
6	Defence Amendment Act, 2020
7	Appropriation Act, 2020
8	Civil Union Amendment Act, 2020
9	Science and Technology Laws Amendment Act, 2020
10	Division of Revenue Amendment Act, 2020
11	Adjustments Appropriation Act, 2020
12	Judicial Matters Amendment Act, 2020
13	Disaster Management Tax Relief Act, 2020
14	Disaster Management Tax Relief Administration Act, 2020
15	Prescription in Civil and Criminal Matters (Sexual Offences) Amendment Act, 2020
16	Social Assistance Amendment Act, 2020
17	Airports Company Amendment Act, 2020
18	Air Traffic and Navigation Services Company Amendment Act, 2020
19	Cybercrimes Act, 2020
20	Division of Revenue Second Amendment Act, 2020
21	Second Adjustments Appropriation Act, 2020
22	Rates and Monetary Amounts and Amendment of Revenue Laws Act, 2020
23	Taxation Laws Amendment Act, 2020
24	Tax Administration Laws Amendment Act, 2020

== 2021 ==
Act no.	Short title
1	Recognition of Customary Marriages Amendment Act, 2021
2	Customary Initiation Act, 2021
3	Local Government: Municipal Structures Amendment Act, 2021
4	Electoral Laws Amendment Act, 2021
5	Auditing Profession Amendment Act, 2021
6	Upgrading of Land Tenure Rights Amendment Act, 2021
7	Correctional Services Amendment Act, 2021
8	Liquor Products Amendment Act, 2021
9	Division of Revenue Act, 2021
10	Appropriation Act, 2021
11	Special Appropriation Act, 2021
12	Criminal and Related Matters Amendment Act, 2021
13	Criminal Law (Sexual Offences and Related Matters) Amendment Act Amendment Act, 2021
14	Domestic Violence Amendment Act, 2021
15	Second Special Appropriation Act, 2021
16	Criminal Procedure Amendment Act, 2021
17	Division of Revenue Amendment Act, 2021
18	Adjustments Appropriation Act, 2021
19	Rates and Monetary Amounts and Amendment of Revenue Laws Act, 2021
20	Taxation Laws Amendment Act, 2021
21	Tax Administration Laws Amendment Act, 2021
22	Civil Aviation Amendment Act, 2021
23	Financial Sector Laws Amendment Act, 2021

== 2022 ==
Act no.	Short title
1	National Forests Amendment Act, 2022
2	National Environmental Management Laws Amendment Act, 2022
3	Local Government: Municipal Systems Amendment Act, 2022
4	Employment Equity Amendment Act, 2022
5	Division of Revenue Act, 2022
6	Second Adjustments Appropriation (2021/22 Financial Year) Act, 2022
7	Appropriation Act, 2022
8	Criminal Law (Forensic Procedures) Amendment Act, 2022
9	Traditional Courts Act, 2022
10	Compensation for Occupational Injuries and Diseases Amendment Act, 2022
11	Financial Sector and Deposit Insurance Levies Act, 2022
12	Financial Sector and Deposit Insurance Levies (Administration) and Deposit Insurance Premiums Act, 2022
13	Sectional Titles Amendment Act, 2022
14	Drugs and Drug Trafficking Amendment Act, 2022
15	Division of Revenue Amendment Act, 2022
16	Tax Administration Laws Amendment Act, 2022
17	Children’s Amendment Act, 2022
18	Special Appropriation Act, 2022
19	Rates and Monetary Amounts and Amendment of Revenue Laws Act, 2022
20	Taxation Laws Amendment Act, 2022
21	Adjustments Appropriation Act, 2022
22	General Laws (Anti-Money Laundering and Combating Terrorism Financing) Amendment Act, 2022
23	Protection of Constitutional Democracy against Terrorist and Related Activities Act, 2022

== 2023 ==
Act no.	Short title
	Constitution Eighteenth Amendment Act of 2023
1	Electoral Amendment Act, 2023
2	Second Adjustments Appropriation (2022/23 Financial Year) Act, 2023
4	Repeal of the Transkeian Penal Code Act, 2023
5	Division of Revenue Act, 2023
6	Land Court Act, 2023
7	Eskom Debt Relief Act, 2023
8	Appropriation Act, 2023
9	Financial Matters Amendment Act, 2023
10	South African Postbank Limited Amendment Act, 2023
11	Fund-raising Amendment Act, 2023
12	Agricultural Product Standards Amendment Act, 2023
13	National Veld and Forest Fire Amendment Act, 2023
14	Correctional Services Amendment Act, 2023
15	Judicial Matters Amendment Act, 2023
16	Prevention and Combating of Hate Crimes and Hate Speech Act, 2023
17	Taxation Laws Amendment Act, 2023
18	Tax Administration Laws Amendment Act, 2023
19	Rates and Monetary Amounts and Amendment of Revenue Laws Act, 2023
20	National Health Insurance Act, 2023
21	Adjustments Appropriation Act, 2023
23	National Land Transport Amendment Act, 2023
24	Division of Revenue Amendment Act, 2023

== 2024 ==
Act no.	Short title
1	Divorce Amendment Act, 2024
4	Municipal Fiscal Powers and Functions Amendment Act, 2024
5	Eskom Debt Relief Amendment Act, 2024
6	Economic Regulation of Transport Act, 2024
7	Cannabis for Private Purposes Act, 2024
8	National Road Traffic Amendment Act, 2024
9	National Council on Gender-Based Violence and Femicide Act, 2024
10	National Prosecuting Authority Amendment Act, 2024
11	National Youth Development Agency Amendment Act, 2024
12	Revenue Laws Amendment Act, 2024
13	Expropriation Act, 2024
14	Electoral Matters Amendment Act, 2024
15	Independent Police Investigative Directorate Amendment Act, 2024
16	Companies Amendment Act, 2024
17	Companies Second Amendment Act, 2024
18	Second Adjustments Appropriation (2023/24 Financial Year) Act, 2024
19	South African Post Office SOC Ltd Amendment Act, 2024
21	National Small Enterprise Amendment Act, 2024
22	Climate Change Act, 2024
23	Upstream Petroleum Resources Development Act, 2024
24	Division of Revenue Act, 2024
25	Housing Consumer Protection Act, 2024
26	National Nuclear Regulator Amendment Act, 2024
27	Gold and Foreign Exchange Contingency Reserve Account Defrayal Amendment Act, 2024
28	Public Procurement Act, 2024
29	Statistics Amendment Act, 2024
31	Pension Funds Amendment Act, 2024
32	Basic Education Laws Amendment Act, 2024
34	South African National Water Resources Infrastructure Agency SOC Limited Act, 2024
33	South African Institute for Drug-Free Sport Amendment Act, 2024
35	Plant Health (Phytosanitary) Act, 2024
36	Marine Pollution (Prevention of Pollution from Ships) Amendment Act, 2024
37	General Intelligence Laws Amendment Act, 2024
38	Electricity Regulation Amendment Act, 2024
39	Preservation and Development of Agricultural Land Act, 2024
40	Appropriation Act, 2024
41	Transport Appeal Tribunal Amendment Act, 2024
42	Taxation Laws Amendment Act, 2024
44	Revenue Laws Second Amendment Act, 2024
45	Rates and Monetary Amounts Amendment Act, 2024
46	Global Minimum Tax Act, 2024
47	Global Minimum Tax Administration Act, 2024
48	Division of Revenue Amendment Act, 2024
49	Adjustments Appropriation Act, 2024
50	Special Appropriation Act, 2024

== 2025 ==
Act no.	Short title
1	Older Persons Amendment Act, 2025
2	Division of Revenue Act, 2025
3	Appropriation Act, 2025
4	Public Sector Pension and Related Payments Act, 2025
5	Eskom Debt Relief Amendment Act, 2025
6	Revenue Laws Amendment Act, 2025
7	Public Administration Management Amendment Act, 2025
10	Economic Regulation of Transport Amendment Act, 2025
12	Division of Revenue Amendment Act, 2025

== 2026 ==
Act no.	Short title
1	Special Appropriation Act, 2026
2	Adjustments Appropriation Act, 2026
