= Historical Monuments Commission =

Former government agency of South Africa

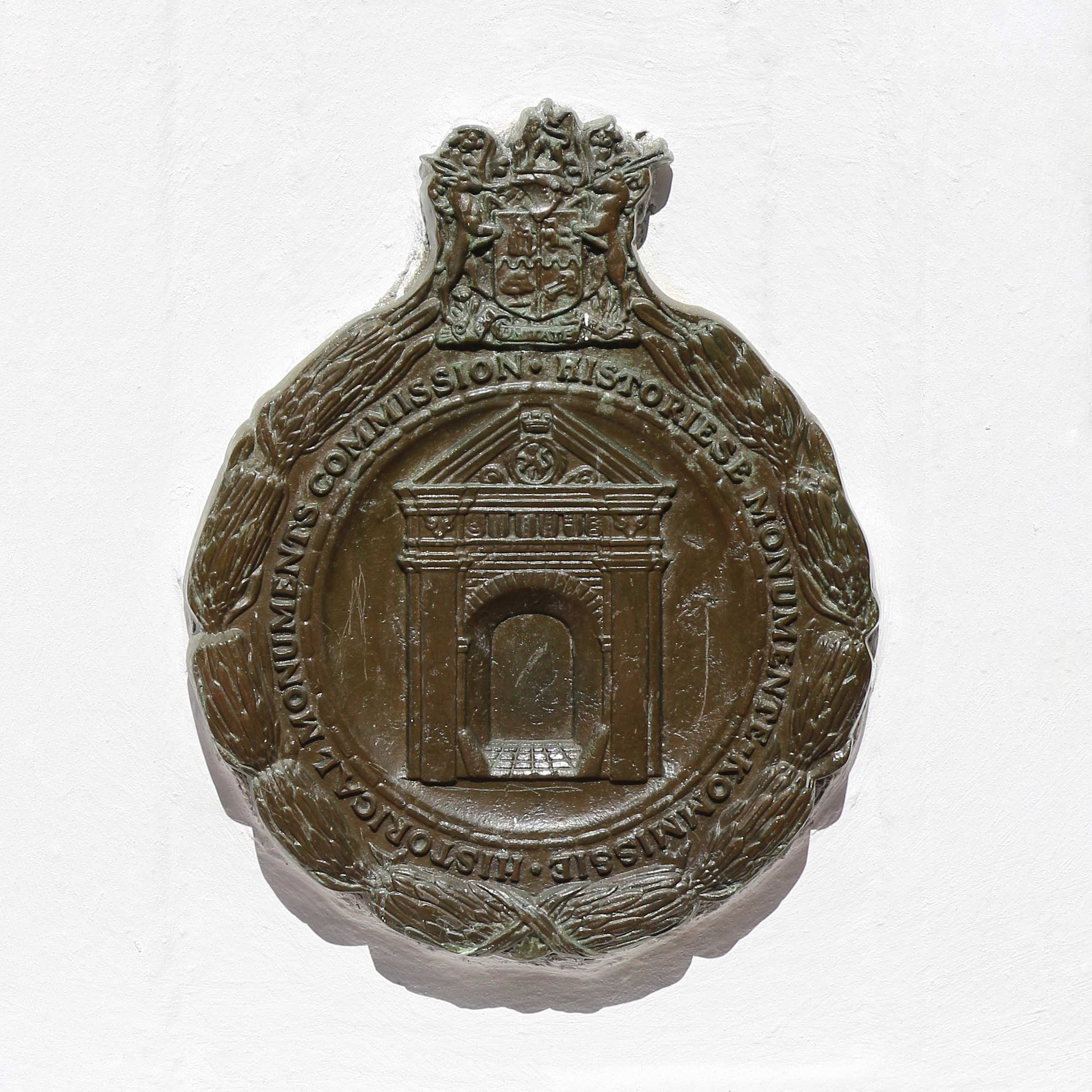
- Abbreviation: HMC
- Established: 10 April 1923
- Dissolved: 1969
- Legal status: Defunct
- Region served: South Africa

The Historical Monuments Commission (HMC) was the national heritage conservation authority of South Africa from 1923 to 1969. The HMC was the first such body to be established in South Africa and was the predecessor of the National Monuments Council and therefore also of SAHRA and South Africa's provincial heritage resources authorities. From 1934 onwards the Commission became known principally for its declaration of several hundred historical monuments, later known as 'national monuments' and today as provincial heritage sites.

== History ==
Known officially as 'The Commission for the Preservation of Natural and Historical Monuments of the Union', the HMC was established thirteen years after the coming into being of the Union of South Africa in 1910. It was the first government agency to be specifically tasked with conservation of the country's heritage. Prior to its creation the only such protections had been limited powers afford the Minister of the Interior to control archaeology and rock art via the Bushman-Relics Protection Act, 1911.

=== Natural and Historical Monuments Commission Act of 1923 ===
Under the Natural and Historical Monuments Act, 1923, the commission was appointed by the Governor General and consisted of seven or more unpaid members. It had powers to identify 'monuments of the Union', but could not protect them other than by negotiating an agreement between the owner and a government agency. With an owner's agreement it could also control access to monuments and charge an entrance fee.

=== Natural and Historical Monuments, Relics and Antiquities Act of 1934 ===
In 1934 the Natural and Historical Monuments Act of 1923 was replaced by the Natural and Historical Monuments, Relics and Antiques Act and the Bushman Relics Protection Act was also withdrawn. The new act retained the commission with the same membership provisions as previously and now fell under the responsibility of the Minister of the Interior.

The major difference between this act and its predecessor was that the HMC could now:

- employ staff,
- erect information 'tablets' explaining the significance of a heritage site,
- and make recommendations to the Minister of the Interior to proclaim
  - a site as a 'monument';
  - a fossil, rock art or archaeological or anthropological material as a 'relic';
  - or any other moveable artefact over a hundred years old as an 'antique'.

The latter measures represent the first attempt in South Africa to institute what the country's present heritage legislation terms 'formal protection' and the creation of real powers for the commission to protect heritage in that its consent was required to make any changes to heritage proclaimed in this way. The new Act also for the first time gave to the Minister powers to prevent export of cultural material and these measures are at the origin of similar provisions in the present day National Heritage Resources Act.

=== Conservation activities ===
During the 46 years of its existence the HMC proclaimed around 300 historical monuments and erected approximately 200 plaques explaining the significance of heritage sites.

=== Legacy ===
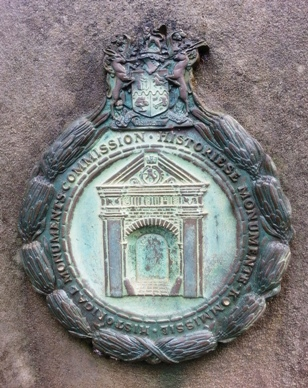
Badge used on former historical monuments

The most prevalent legacy of the Historical Monuments Commission is its development of the bronze badge which is still found on most provincial heritage sites in South Africa and heritage places in Namibia in that an adaptation of the badge was used by its successor body, the National Monuments Council to mark thousands of former national monuments. The organisation is also recognised as having pioneered formal heritage conservation in South Africa and the focus of the legislation under which it functioned and the strong emphasis of the organisation on proclamation of 'monuments' formed national attitudes to heritage conservation and determines that other mechanisms for heritage conservation are not yet well established in the public mind.

Unlike its successor, the National Monuments Council, neither of the Acts under which the HMC functioned gave it powers to operate in the South African occupied territory of South West Africa (now Namibia) and heritage there was unprotected for the entire duration of the existence of the organisation.

== Logo ==
The logo of the Historical Monuments Commission depicted the entrance gate of the Cape Town Castle (the first historical monument to be declared by the Commission) surrounded by a wreath of King Proteas (South Africa's national flower) and capped with the national coat of arms that was used after union in 1910. This logo remained the symbol for heritage conservation in South Africa up to the establishment of SAHRA in 2000. The National Monuments Council changed it only slightly, including a padrão in the centre of the castle gateway, a symbol of the Portuguese 'discovery' of Africa and apparently symbolic of the heritage of South West Africa (now Namibia).

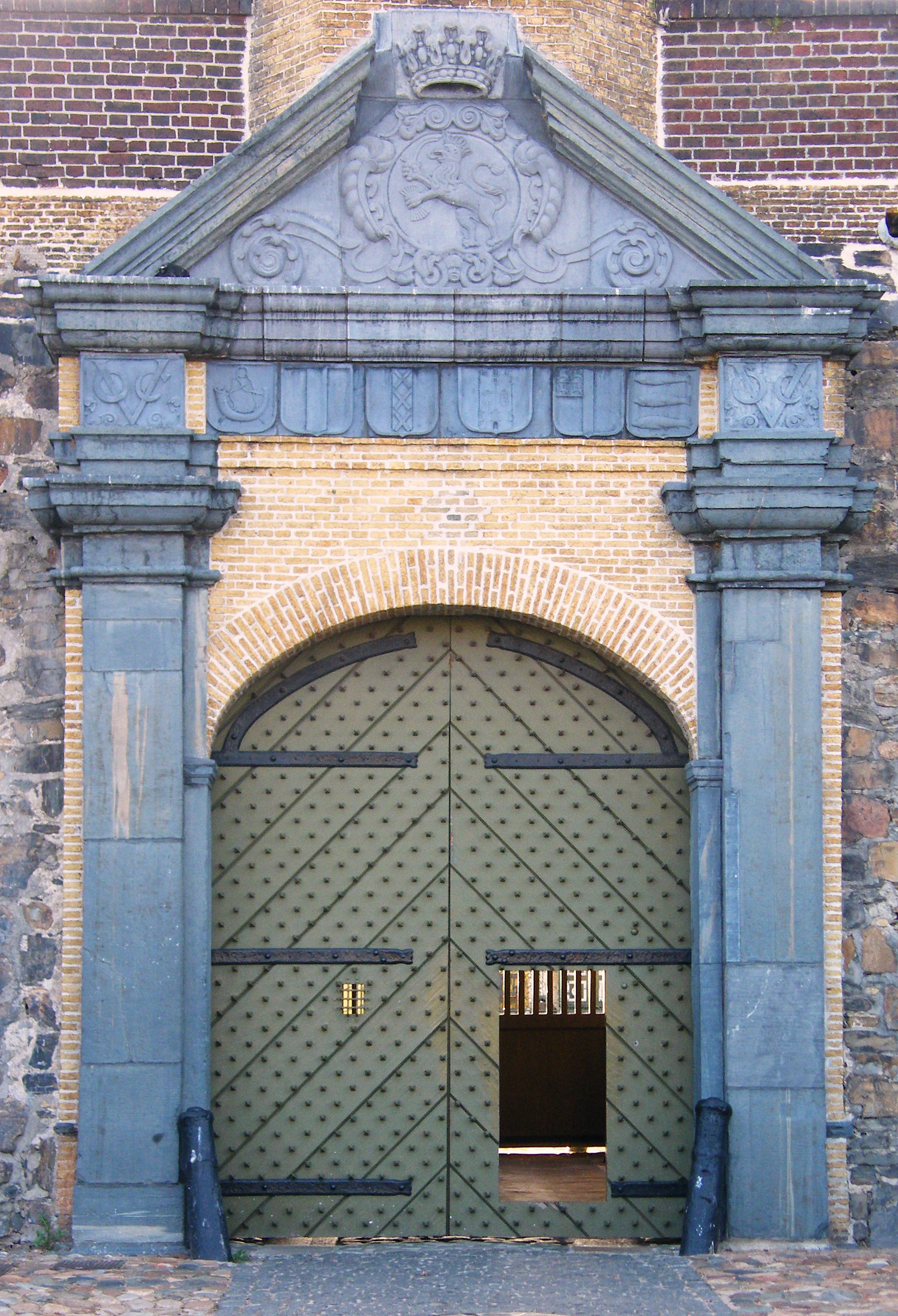
The gateway to Cape Town Castle, South Africa's first formally protected heritage site

== Funding ==
Under the 1923 Act the commission was responsible for raising its own funds from donations and subscriptions. The 1934 Act retained similar provisions and throughout its existence, and unlike its successors, the organisation received no funding from State coffers.

== Successor organisations ==
The following organisations are/were successors to the Historical Monuments Commission:

- Amafa aKwaZulu-Natali (KwaZulu-Natal Province)
- Eastern Cape Provincial Heritage Resources Authority (Eastern Cape Province)
- Heritage Free State (Free State Province)
- Heritage Western Cape (Western Cape Province)
- Limpopo Provincial Heritage Resources Authority (Limpopo Province)
- Mpumalanga Provincial Heritage Resources Authority (Mpumalanga Province)
- National Heritage Council of Namibia
- National Monuments Council
- National Monuments Council of Namibia
- Northern Cape Heritage Resources Authority (Northern Cape Province)
- North West Provincial Heritage Resources Authority (North West Province)
- Provincial Heritage Resources Authority Gauteng (Gauteng Province)
- South African Heritage Resources Agency (SAHRA)

In Namibia the National Heritage Council is the successor in all respects whereas in South Africa the National Heritage Resources Act, specifically, but not exclusively Sections 11–13, 23–26 and 58 thereof, establish how responsibilities are divided between the South African Heritage Resources Agency and provincial heritage resources authorities.

== See also ==
- Provincial heritage resources authority
- Amafa aKwaZulu-Natali
- Heritage Western Cape
- Northern Cape Heritage Resources Authority
- National Heritage Council of Namibia
- South African Heritage Resources Agency
- Provincial heritage site (South Africa)
- National heritage site (South Africa)
- Heritage objects (South Africa)
- List of heritage sites in South Africa
