= List of acts of the Parliament of South Africa, 1920–1929 =

This is a list of acts of the Parliament of South Africa enacted in the years 1920 to 1929.

South African acts are uniquely identified by the year of passage and an act number within that year. Some acts have gone by more than one short title in the course of their existence; in such cases each title is listed with the years in which it applied.

== 1920 ==
Act no.	Short title
1	Appropriation (Part) Act, 1920
2	Additional Appropriation (1919–1920) Act, 1920
3	Railways and Harbours Capital and Betterment Works Additional Appropriation (1919–1920) Act, 1920
4	Railways and Harbours Appropriation (Part) Act, 1920
5	Railways and Harbours Additional Appropriation (1919–1920) Act, 1920
6	Financial Relations Act Second Extension Act, 1920
7	Tenants' Protection (Temporary) Act, 1920
8	Customs Duties (Suspension) Act, 1920
9	Constitution of the Senate Act, 1920
10	Rand Water Board Statutes, 1903–1914 Amendment (Private) Act, 1920
11	Natal and Transvaal Marriage Law Amendment Act, 1920
12	Appellate Division Act, 1920
13	Rents Act, 1920
14	Wills Ordinance, 1903 (Transvaal) Amendment Act, 1920
15	Hlobane Railway Acquisition Act, 1920
16	Carnarvon Outer Commonage Settlement Act Amendment Act, 1920
17	Cape Town Water Supply (Steenbras) Land Act, 1920
18	Second Appropriation (Part) Act, 1920
19	Second Railways and Harbours Appropriation (Part) Act, 1920
20	Railways and Harbours Unauthorized Expenditure (1918–1919) Act, 1920
21	Unauthorized Expenditure (1918–1919) Act, 1920
22	Registration of Pedigree Livestock Act, 1920
23	Native Affairs Act, 1920
24	Native Registered Voters Relief Act 1887 (Cape) Amendment Act, 1920 (before 1964); Bantu Registered Voters Relief Act 1887 (Cape) Amendment Act, 1920 (from 1964 to 1978); Black Registered Voters Relief Act 1887 (Cape) Amendment Act, 1920 (after 1978)
25	Eastern Province Guardian Loan and Investment Company Amendment, Indemnity and Further Powers, (Private) Act, 1920
26	Huguenot College Act 1907 (Cape) Amendment (Private) Act, 1920
27	Profiteering Act, 1920
28	Land Settlement Acts Further Amendment Act, 1920
29	Speculation in Foodstuffs Prevention Act, 1920
30	Matriculation Exemption Act, 1920
31	Currency and Banking Act, 1920
32	Railways and Harbours Regulation, Control and Management Act Amendment Act, 1920
33	University of Cape Town (Medical School) Act, 1920
34	Railways and Harbours Strike and Service Act Amendment Act, 1920
35	Housing Act, 1920
36	Appropriation (1920–1921) Act, 1920
37	Railways and Harbours Appropriation (1920–1921) Act, 1920
38	Public Welfare and Moratorium Acts Further Extension Act, 1920
39	Pensions (Supplementary) Act, 1920
40	Financial Adjustments Act, 1920
41	War Special Pensions Act Amendment Act, 1920
42	Universities and Higher Education Acts Amendment Act, 1920
43	Indian Immigration Trust Board (Natal) Transfer Act, 1920
44	Customs and Excise Duties Act, 1920
45	Income Tax (Consolidation) Act Further Amendment Act, 1920
46	Prisons and Reformatories Act Amendment Act, 1920
47	Post Office Administration and Shipping Combinations Discouragement Act Amendment Act, 1920

== 1921 ==
Act no.	Short title
1	Additional Appropriation (1920–1921) Act, 1921
2	Railways and Harbours Additional Appropriation (1920–1921) Act, 1921
3	Appropriation (Part) Act, 1921
4	Railways and Harbours Appropriation (Part) Act, 1921
5	Financial Relations Acts Further Extension Act, 1921
6	South African Public Library (Board of Trustees) Act, 1921
7	Grey Collection Act, 1921
8	Bills of Exchange (Time of Noting) Act Amendment Act, 1921
9	Natal Native High Court Act, 1921
10	Rand Water Board Statutes 1903–1920 Amendment (Private) Act, 1921
11	Administration of Justice (Orange Free State) Amendment Act, 1921
12	Second Appropriation (Part) Act, 1921
13	Magistrates' Courts Act Amendment Act, 1921
14	Restriction on the Importation of Wine and Spirits Act, 1921
15	University of the Witwatersrand, Johannesburg, (Private) Act, 1921
16	Second Railways and Harbours Appropriation (Part) Act, 1921
17	Marriage Law Amendment Act, 1921
18	Natives Advances Regulation Act, 1921
19	Admission of Advocates Act, 1921
20	Transvaal Liquor Licensing Ordinance, 1902, Amendment Act, 1921
21	Railways and Harbours Unauthorized Expenditure (1919–1920) Act, 1921
22	Unauthorized Expenditure (1919–1920) Act, 1921
23	Zuidafrikaanse Akademie voor Taal, Letteren en Kunst (Private) Act, 1921
24	Durban Waterworks Consolidation (Private) Act, 1921
25	Potchefstroom University College (Private) Act, 1921
26	Children's Protection Act Amendment Act, 1921
27	Messina Railway Further Amendment Act, 1921
28	Speculation in Foodstuffs Prevention (Repealing) Act, 1921
29	Income Tax (Consolidation) Act Further Amendment Act, 1921
30	Rents Act Extension and Amendment Act, 1921
31	Stamp Duties and Fees Act Further Amendment Act, 1921
32	Treaties of Peace Act, 1921
33	Juveniles Act, 1921
34	Bethelsdorp Settlement Act, 1921
35	Customs and Excise Duties Amendment Act, 1921
36	Land Bank Act Further Amendment Act, 1921
37	Pensions (Supplementary) Act, 1921
38	Financial Adjustments Act, 1921
39	Appropriation (1921–1922) Act, 1921
40	Railways and Harbours Appropriation (1921–1922) Act, 1921

== 1922 ==
Act no.	Short title
1	Railways and Harbours Additional Appropriation (1921–1922) Act, 1921
2	Additional Appropriation (1921–1922) Act, 1922
3	Appropriation (Part) Act, 1922
4	Railways and Harbours Appropriation (Part) Act, 1922
5	Financial Relations Fourth Extension Act, 1922
6	Indemnity and Trial of Offenders Act, 1922
7	Frankenwald Estate Transfer Act, 1922
8	Crown Lands Disposal Act (Cape) Amendment Act, 1922
9	Public Archives Act, 1922
10	Rents Acts Extension and Further Amendment Act, 1922
11	Fencing Act Amendment Act, 1922
12	Agricultural Pests Act Amendment Act, 1922
13	Imports Regulation, 1922
14	Prevention of Cruelty to Animals Act, 1914, Amendment Act, 1922
15	Deeds Registries Act, 1918, Amendment Act, 1922
16	Agricultural Products Grading Act, 1922
17	Angora Goat Export Prohibition (Repealing) Act, 1922
18	Railways and Harbours Unauthorized Expenditure (1920–1921) Act, 1922
19	Unauthorized Expenditure (1920–1921) Act, 1922
20	South-West Africa Railways and Harbours Act, 1922
21	Land Settlement Acts Further Amendment Act, 1922
22	South Africa Defence Act Amendment Act, 1922
23	Income Tax Act, 1922
24	South-West Africa Affairs Act, 1922
25	South African Alkali and Lichtenburg Salt Pan Leases Act, 1922
26	Apprenticeship Act, 1922
27	Coal Act, 1922
28	Co-operative Societies Act, 1922
29	Death Duties Act, 1922
30	Railways Construction Act, 1922
31	Coinage Act, 1922
32	Weights and Measures, 1922
33	Defence Endowment Property and Account Act, 1922
34	Appropriation (1922–1923) Act, 1922
35	Customs and Excise Duties Amendment Act, 1922
36	Railways and Harbours Appropriation (1922–1923) Act, 1922
37	Exchequer and Audit Act Further Amendment Act, 1922
38	Financial Adjustments Act, 1922
39	Pensions (Supplementary) Act, 1922
40	Land Bank Acts Further Amendment Act, 1922
41	Iron and Steel Industry Encouragement Act, 1922
42	Electricity Act, 1922

== 1923 ==
Act no.	Short title
1	Railways and Harbours Appropriation (Part) Act, 1923
2	Railways and Harbours Additional Appropriation (1922–1923) Act, 1923
3	Appropriation (Part) Act, 1923
4	Additional Appropriation (1922–1923) Act, 1923
5	Boxing Act, 1923 (before 1942); Boxing and Wrestling Act, 1923 (after 1942)
6	Natural and Historical Monuments Act, 1923
7	Women Legal Practitioners Act, 1923
8	Anatomy Act Amendment Act, 1923
9	Magistrates' Courts Act, 1917, Further Amendment Act, 1923
10	Statutory Pensions Protection Act, 1923
11	Radio Telegraph Station Act, 1923
12	Beef Export Bounties Act, 1923
13	Railways and Harbours Unauthorized Expenditure (1921–1922) Act, 1923
14	Mapochs Gronden Water and Commonage Act Amendment Act, 1923
15	Maintenance Orders Act, 1923
16	Aviation Act, 1923
17	Births, Marriages and Deaths Registration Act, 1923
18	Rand Water Board Statutes 1903–1921 Amendment Act, 1923
19	Income Tax Act, 1923
20	Rents Acts Extension Act, 1923
21	Natives (Urban Areas) Act, 1923
22	Currency and Banking Act Amendment Act, 1923
23	Customs and Excise Duties Amendment Act, 1923
24	Unauthorized Expenditure (1921–1922) Act, 1923
25	Adoption of Children Act, 1923
26	Stock Theft Act, 1923
27	Public Service and Pensions Act, 1923 (before 1936); Public Service Act, 1923 (after 1936)
28	Board of Trade and Industries Act, 1923
29	Railways and Harbours Strike Condonation Act, 1923
30	Higher Education Act, 1923
31	Diseases of Stock Act Amendment Act, 1923
32	Adulterated Leather Act, 1923
33	Pensions (Supplementary) Act, 1923
34	Railways and Harbours Appropriation (1923–1924) Act, 1923
35	Financial Adjustments Act, 1923
36	Appropriation (1923–1924) Act, 1923
37	Insurance Act, 1923

== 1924 ==
Act no.	Short title
1	Additional Appropriation (1923–1924) Act, 1924
2	Water Court Judge Act, 1924
3	Cape of Good Hope Savings Bank Society Amendment Act, 1924
4	Railways and Harbours Additional Appropriation (1923–1924) Act, 1924
5	Wine and Spirits Control Act, 1924
6	Agricultural Pests Act Further Amendment Act, 1924
7	Native Chiefs' Jurisdiction (Transvaal and British Bechuanaland) Act, 1924
8	Prisons and Reformatories Act Further Amendment Act, 1924
9	South African Public Library (Pensions and Provident Fund) Act, 1924
10	Trading on Mining Ground Regulation Act (Transvaal) Amendment Act, 1924
11	Industrial Conciliation Act, 1924
12	Asiatic (Cape Malay) Amendment Act, 1924
13	Appropriation (Part) Act, 1924
14	Railways and Harbours Appropriation (Part) Act, 1924
15	Apprenticeship Act, 1922, Amendment Act, 1924
16	Drought Distress Relief Act, 1924
17	Second Appropriation (Part) Act, 1924
18	Second Railways and Harbours Appropriation (Part) Act, 1924
19	Rhodes University College Act, 1904 (Cape), Amendment (Private) Act, 1924
20	Removal or Modification of Restrictions on Immovable Property Act, 1916, Amendment Act, 1924
21	Financial Relations Adjustment Act, 1924
22	Third Appropriation (Part) Act, 1924
23	Third Railways and Harbours Appropriation (Part) Act, 1924
24	Unauthorized Expenditure (1922–1923) Act, 1924
25	Railways and Harbours Unauthorized Expenditure (1922–1923) Act, 1924
26	Income Tax Act, 1924
27	Customs and Excise Duties Amendment Act, 1924
28	Moroka Ward Land Relief Act, 1924
29	Rents Acts Extension Act, 1924
30	South-West Africa Naturalization of Aliens Act, 1924
31	Zululand Railway Construction Act, 1924
32	Land Bank Acts Further Amendment Act, 1924
33	Board of Trade and Industries Act, 1924
34	Electricity Act Amendment Act, 1924
35	Miners' Phthisis Act Amendment Act, 1924
36	Financial Adjustments Act, 1924
37	Pensions (Supplementary) Act, 1924
38	Land Settlement Acts Further Amendment Act, 1924
39	Appropriation (1924–1925) Act, 1924
40	Railways and Harbours Appropriation (1924–1925) Act, 1924

== 1925 ==
Act no.	Short title
1	Additional Appropriation (1924–1925) Act, 1925
2	Railways and Harbours Additional Appropriation (1924–1925) Act, 1925
3	Appropriation (Part) Act, 1925
4	Railways and Harbours Appropriation (Part) Act, 1925
5	Housing Act, 1920, Amendment Act, 1925
6	Wild Birds Export Prohibition Act, 1925
7	Union and Rhodesia Customs Agreement Act, 1925
8	Official Languages of the Union Act, 1925
9	South Africa Act, 1909, Amendment Act, 1925
10	South African Museum Act, 1857 (Cape), Amendment Act, 1925
11	South African Association Incorporation Act, 1906 (Cape) Amendment (Private) Act, 1925
12	Fruit Export Control Act, 1925
13	Orchard Cleansing Act, 1925
14	Ebenezer (Van Rhynsdorp) Exchange of Land Act, 1925
15	Sundays River Settlements Administration Act, 1925
16	Agricultural Industries Advancement Act, 1925
17	City of Cape Town (Muizenberg Beach) Improvement Act, 1925
18	Diseases of Stock Act, 1911, Further Amendment Act, 1925
19	Unauthorized Expenditure (1923–1924) Act, 1925
20	Railways and Harbours Unauthorized Expenditure (1923–1924) Act, 1925
21	Settlements (Committee of Management) Act, 1925
22	Public Auctions and Transactions in Livestock and Produce Act, 1925
23	Railways and Harbours Service Act, 1925
24	Railways and Harbours Superannuation Fund Act, 1925
25	Government Attorney Act, 1925
26	Land Settlement Laws Further Amendment Act, 1925
27	Wage Act, 1925
28	Native Lands (Natal and Transvaal) Release Act, 1925 (before 1964); Bantu Lands (Natal and Transvaal) Release Act, 1925 (from 1964 to 1978); Black Lands (Natal and Transvaal) Release Act, 1925 (after 1978)
29	Appropriation (1925–1926) Act, 1925
30	Railways and Harbours Appropriation (1925–1926) Act, 1925
31	Death Duties Act, 1922, Amendment Act, 1925
32	Licenses Consolidation Act, 1925
33	Railways Construction Act, 1925
34	South Africa Act, 1909, Further Amendment Act, 1925
35	Miners' Phthisis Acts Consolidation Act, 1925
36	Customs Tariff and Excise Duties Amendment Act, 1925
37	New Cape Central Railway Acquisition Act, 1925
38	Co-operative Societies Act, 1922, Amendment Act, 1925
39	Diamond Control Act, 1925
40	Income Tax Act, 1925
41	Natives Taxation and Development Act, 1925 (before 1964); Bantu Taxation and Development Act, 1925 (after 1964)
42	South-West Africa Constitution Act, 1925
43	Financial Adjustments Act, 1925
44	Pensions (Supplementary) Act, 1925
45	Merchant Shipping (Certificates of Competency) Act, 1925
46	Provincial Subsidies and Taxation Powers (Amendment) Act, 1925

== 1926 ==
Act no.	Short title
1	Local Government (Provincial Powers) Act, 1926
2	Additional Appropriation (1925–1926) Act, 1926
3	Bethelsdorp Settlement Act, 1921, Amendment Act, 1926
4	Brandvlei Land and Irrigation Works Act, 1926
5	Mooi River Township Lands Act, 1926
6	Relief Settlements Act, 1926
7	Wine, Spirits and Vinegar Act, 1913, Amendment Act, 1926
8	Appropriation (Part) Act, 1926
9	Railways and Harbours Additional Appropriation (1925–1926) Act, 1926
10	Railways and Harbours Appropriation (Part) Act, 1926
11	Electoral Act, 1918, Amendment Act, 1926
12	Railways and Harbours Unauthorized Expenditure (1924–1925) Act, 1926
13	Fugitive Criminals (Further Provision) Act, 1926
14	Dairy Industry Act, 1918, Amendment Act, 1926
15	Kopjes Township Act, 1926
16	Winterton Irrigation Settlement (Local Board of Management) Act, 1926
17	Carnarvon Outer Commonage Subdivision Act, 1926
18	British Nationality in the Union and Naturalization and Status of Aliens Act, 1926
19	Local Loans Act, 1926
20	Radio Act, 1926
21	Unauthorized Expenditure (1924–1925) Act, 1926
22	South-West Africa Mental Disorders Act, 1926
23	Cape Franchise Amendment Act, 1926
24	Natal Conveyancers Act, 1926
25	Mines and Works Act, 1911, Amendment Act, 1926
26	Masters and Servants Law (Transvaal and Natal) Amendment Act, 1926
27	Native Affairs Act, 1920, Amendment Act, 1926
28	Natives Taxation and Development Act, 1925, Amendment Act, 1926 (before 1964); Bantu Taxation and Development Act, 1925, Amendment Act, 1926 (after 1964)
29	Insolvency Act, 1916, Amendment Act, 1926
30	Railways and Harbours Service and Superannuation Fund Acts Amendment, 1926
31	Provincial Subsidies and Taxation Powers (Further Amendment) Act, 1926
32	University Schools Transfer Act, 1926
33	Irrigation Commission Act, 1926
34	Customs Tariff (Amendment) Act, 1926
35	Railways and Harbours Appropriation (1926–1927) Act, 1926
36	Income Tax Act, 1926
37	Usury Act, 1926
38	Appropriation (1926–1927) Act, 1926
39	Criminal and Magistrates' Courts Procedure (Amendment) Act, 1926
40	Agricultural Credit Act, 1926
41	Pensions (Supplementary) Act, 1926
42	Pensions (Second Supplementary), 1926
43	Iron and Steel Industry Encouragement Act, 1922, Amendment Act, 1926
44	Financial Adjustments Act, 1926
45	Stellenbosch-Elsenburg College of Agriculture Act, 1926
46	Companies Act, 1926
47	Sugar Prices Act, 1926
48	Railways Construction Act, 1926
49	Republican Officials' and Other Persons' Pensions Act, 1926
50	Public Debt Commissioners (Amendment) Act, 1926
51	Payment of Members of Parliament Act, 1926
52	Transvaal Precious and Base Metals Act, 1908, Amendment Act, 1926
53	Perishable Products Export Control Act, 1926
54	Senate Act, 1926
55	Reserved Minerals Development Act, 1926
56	National Parks Act, 1926

== 1927 ==
Act no.	Short title
1	Natal Gambling Law Amendment Act, 1927
2	Diamond Cutting Act, 1919, Amendment Act, 1927
3	Additional Appropriation (1926–1927) Act, 1927
4	Railways and Harbours Additional Appropriation (1926–1927) Act, 1927
5	Immorality Act, 1927
6	Appropriation (Part) Act, 1927
7	Criminal Procedure and Evidence Act, 1917, Amendment Act, 1927
8	Railways and Harbours Appropriation (Part) Act, 1927
9	Land Survey Act, 1927
10	British Nationality in the Union and Naturalization and Status of Aliens Act, 1926, Amendment Act, 1927
11	Administration of Justice (Further Amendment) Act, 1927
12	Durban Borough (Extension of Area) Act, 1927
13	Chartered Accountants Designation (Private) Act, 1927
14	Payment of Quitrent (Cape) Act, 1927
15	Native Affairs Act, 1920, Further Amendment Act, 1927
16	Co-operative Agricultural Societies Debts Repayment Act, 1927
17	Wesleyan Methodist Church (Private) Act, 1927
18	Architects and Quantity Surveyors (Private) Act, 1927
19	Railways and Harbours Unauthorized Expenditure (1925–1926) Act, 1927
20	Work Colonies Act, 1927
21	Unauthorized Expenditure (1925–1926) Act, 1927
22	South-West Africa Constitution Act, 1925, Amendment Act, 1927
23	Income Tax Act, 1927
24	Customs Management and Tariff (Amendment) Act, 1927
25	Drought Distress Relief Act, 1927
26	Licences (Amendment) Act, 1927
27	Financial Adjustments Act, 1927
28	Appropriation (1927–1928) Act, 1927
29	Railways and Harbours Appropriation (1927–1928) Act, 1927
30	Railways Construction Act, 1927
31	Railways and Harbours Regulation, Control and Management Act, 1916, Further Amendment Act, 1927
32	Pensions (Supplementary) Act, 1927
33	Asiatics in the Northern Districts of Natal Act, 1927
34	Native Lands Further Release and Acquisition Act, 1927 (before 1964); Bantu Lands Further Release and Acquisition Act, 1927 (from 1964 to 1978); Black Lands Further Release and Acquisition Act, 1927 (after 1978)
35	Restricted Minerals Export Act, 1927
36	Public Health Act, 1919, Amendment Act, 1927
37	Immigration and Indian Relief (Further Provision) Act, 1927
38	Native Administration Act, 1927 (before 1964); Bantu Administration Act, 1927 (from 1964 to 1978); Black Administration Act, 1927 (after 1978)
39	Provincial Powers (Amendment) Act, 1927
40	Union Nationality and Flags Act, 1927 (before 1949); Flags Act, 1927 (after 1949)
41	Orange Free State Marriage Law Amendment Act, 1927
42	Psorosis Act, 1927
43	Marburg Immigration Settlement (Local Board of Management) Act, 1927
44	Precious Stones Act, 1927

== 1928 ==
Act no.	Short title
1	Diamond Trade Regulation (Natal) Act, 1928
2	Additional Appropriation (1927–1928) Act, 1928
3	Appropriation (Part) Act, 1928
4	Railways and Harbours Additional Appropriation (1927–1928) Act, 1928
5	Railways and Harbours Appropriation (Part) Act, 1928
6	Land Settlement (Amendment) Act, 1928
7	Railways and Harbours Service and Superannuation (Amendment) Act, 1928
8	Railways and Harbours Gratuity Act, 1928
9	Drought Distress Relief (Amendment) Act, 1928
10	Prevention of Cruelty to Animals Act, 1914, Amendment Act, 1928
11	Iron and Steel Industry Act, 1928
12	Railways and Harbours Unauthorized Expenditure (1926–1927) Act, 1928
13	Medical, Dental and Pharmacy Act, 1928
14	Port Beaufort Grant Amendment (Private) Act, 1928
15	Public Health (Amendment) Act, 1928
16	Unauthorized Expenditure (1926–1927) Act, 1928
17	Wine and Spirits Control Amendment Act, 1928
18	Income Tax Act, 1928
19	Customs and Excise Duties (Amendment) Act, 1928
20	Pensions (Supplementary) Act, 1928
21	Financial Adjustments Act, 1928
22	Old Age Pensions Act Act, 1928
23	Radio Amendment Act, 1928
24	Electoral Amendment Act, 1928
25	Railways and Harbours Appropriation (1928–1929) Act, 1928
26	Appropriation (1928–1929) Act, 1928
27	Naturalization of Aliens (South West Africa) Act, 1928
28	Railway Routes Adjustment Act, 1928
29	Vocational Education and Special Schools Act, 1928
30	Liquor Act, 1928

== 1929 ==
Act no.	Short title
1	Unauthorized Expenditure (1927–1928) Act, 1929
2	Railways and Harbours Unauthorized Expenditure (1927–1928) Act, 1929
3	Railway Route (Parys–Vredefort) Adjustment Act, 1929
4	Additional Appropriation (1928–1929) Act, 1929
5	Railways and Harbours Additional Appropriation (1928–1929) Act, 1929
6	Appropriation (Part) Act, 1929
7	Railways and Harbours Appropriation (Part) Act, 1929
8	Railways Construction Act, 1929
9	Native Administration Act, 1927, Amendment Act, 1929 (before 1964); Bantu Administration Act, 1927, Amendment Act, 1929 (from 1964 to 1978); Black Administration Act, 1927, Amendment Act, 1929 (from 1978 to 1998); Administration Amendment Act, 1929 (after 1998)
10	Van Wyk's Vlei Settlement (Local Board of Management) Act, 1929
11	Murray Park (Private) Act, 1929
12	Cape Mission Stations and Communal Reserves (Amendment) Act, 1929
13	Food, Drugs and Disinfectants Act, 1929
14	Customs (Amendment) Act, 1929
15	Pretoria Waterworks (Private) Act, 1929
16	Merchant Shipping Act, 1929
17	Defence Endowment Property and Account (Amendment) Act, 1929
18	Rand Mines Power Supply Company Additional Water Supply (Private) Act, 1929
19	Agricultural Holdings (Transvaal) Registration Act Amendment Act, 1929
20	Shipping Board Act, 1929
21	Irrigation Loans Adjustments Act, 1929
22	Incorporated Law Society of the Orange Free State Amendment (Private) Act, 1929
23	Second Appropriation (Part) Act, 1929
24	Second Railways and Harbours Appropriation (Part) Act, 1929
25	Appropriation (1929–1930) Act, 1929
26	Railways and Harbours Appropriation (1929–1930) Act, 1929
27	Financial Adjustments Act, 1929
28	Pensions (Supplementary) Act, 1929
29	Income Tax Act, 1929
30	Fruit Export Further Control Act, 1929
31	Customs and Excise Duties (Amendment) Act, 1929
