= National Land Transport Amendment Act, 2023 =

South African legislative amendment

The National Land Transport Amendment Act, 2023 (Act No. 23 of 2023) is a legislative amendment enacted by the Parliament of South Africa to update the National Land Transport Act of 2009. It introduces a series of provisions aimed at modernising and streamlining land transport management, promoting inclusivity, and enhancing safety measures.

== Background ==
The original National Land Transport Act (Act No. 5 of 2009) established the framework for managing public and private transport in South Africa. Over time, various challenges and gaps were identified, necessitating a comprehensive update. The 2023 amendment addresses these issues, incorporating technological advancements and evolving transport needs.

The Act was assented to by the President on 6 June 2024 and published in the Government Gazette on 11 June 2024.

== Key features ==
1. Expanded Definitions: The Act introduces new terms and revises existing ones to reflect modern transport modes and governance structures. Notably:
  - Inclusion of "electronic hailing service" (e-hailing).
  - Definition of "non-motorised transport" (NMT) to include walking, cycling, and wheelchairs.
2. Promotion of Accessible and Non-Motorised Transport: The Act mandates the development of infrastructure and services accessible to all, including individuals with disabilities, pedestrians, and cyclists.
3. Integrated Public Transport Networks: Emphasises seamless transport solutions by integrating multiple modes, such as bus rapid transit and rail systems.
4. Enhanced Safety Measures: Introduces regulations for pedestrian and passenger safety, including guidelines for infrastructure design and transport operations.
5. Municipal and Provincial Roles: Expands the powers of municipalities and provinces to conclude contracts, manage operations, and enforce regulations.
6. Regulatory Entities: Establishes and formalises roles for Municipal Regulatory Entities and revises the structure of Provincial and National Public Transport Regulators.
7. Targeted Passenger Categories: Specifies measures for the benefit of "targeted categories of passengers," including persons with disabilities, the elderly, pregnant women, and children.
8. Digital and Branding Updates: Prescribes standards for the branding and colour coding of public transport vehicles to ensure national uniformity.

== Impact and implications ==
The National Land Transport Amendment Act, 2023, aims to:

- Improve governance and coordination across transport authorities.
- Foster sustainability through the inclusion of NMT and accessible transport.
- Enhance public transport reliability and user satisfaction.

== See also ==
- Acts of the Parliament of South Africa
- National Land Transport Act, 2009
