= List of acts of the Parliament of South Africa, 1940–1949 =

This is a list of acts of the Parliament of South Africa enacted in the years 1940 to 1949.

South African acts are uniquely identified by the year of passage and an act number within that year. Some acts have gone by more than one short title in the course of their existence; in such cases each title is listed with the years in which it applied.

== 1940 ==
Act no.	Short title
1	Additional Appropriation Act, 1940
2	Railways and Harbours Additional Appropriation Act, 1940
3	Second Additional Appropriation Act, 1940
4	Unauthorized Expenditure (1938–1939) Act, 1940
5	Part Appropriation Act, 1940
6	Railways and Harbours Part Appropriation Act, 1940
7	Railways and Harbours Unauthorized Expenditure Act, 1940
8	Weights and Measures Amendment Act, 1940
9	Crawfish Export Act, 1940 (before 1953); Rock Lobster Export Act, 1940 (after 1953)
10	Sea Fisheries Act, 1940
11	Fencing Amendment Act, 1940
12	Land Bank Amendment Act, 1940
13	War Measures Act, 1940
14	Public Health Amendment Act, 1940
15	Railways and Harbours (Pensions and Service) Act, 1940
16	Bospoort Irrigation District Adjustment Act, 1940
17	Diseases of Stock Amendment Act, 1940
18	Customs Tariff Amendment Act, 1940
19	Constitution (Prevention of Disabilities) Act, 1940
20	Electoral Laws Amendment Act, 1940
21	Advertising on Roads and Ribbon Development Act, 1940
22	Industrial Development Act, 1940 (before 2001); Industrial Development Corporation Act, 1940 (after 2001)
23	Wine and Spirits Control Amendment Act, 1940
24	Railway Construction Act, 1940
25	Income Tax Act, 1940
26	Rents Amendment Act, 1940
27	Finance Act, 1940
28	Pensions (Supplementary) Act, 1940
29	Defence Special Pensions and Moratorium Act, 1940
30	Appropriation Act, 1940
31	Railways and Harbours Appropriation Act, 1940
32	War Measures (Amendment) Act, 1940
33	Additional Appropriation (1940–1941) Act, 1940
34	Additional Taxation Act, 1940
35	Life Insurance Amendment Act, 1940

== 1941 ==
Act no.	Short title
1	Second Additional Appropriation (1940–1941) Act, 1941
2	Special Pension Act, 1941
3	Electricity Amendment Act, 1941
4	Railways and Harbours Unauthorized Expenditure Act, 1941
5	Railways and Harbours Part Appropriation Act, 1941
6	Railways and Harbours Additional Appropriation Act, 1941
7	Exchequer and Audit Amendment Act, 1941
8	Unauthorized Expenditure (1939–1940) Act, 1941
9	Municipal Lands (Muizenberg) Act, 1941
10	Part Appropriation Act, 1941
11	Third Additional Appropriation (1940–1941) Act, 1941
12	Marketing Amendment Act, 1941
13	Forest and Veld Conservation Act, 1941 (before 1946); Forest Act, 1941 (after 1946)
14	Land Survey Amendment Act, 1941
15	Motor Carrier Transportation Amendment Act, 1941
16	South African Mint Act, 1941
17	Merchandise Marks Act, 1941
18	Government Service Pensions Amendment Act, 1941
19	Attorneys' Admission Amendment and Legal Practitioners' Fidelity Fund Act, 1941
20	Mine Trading Amendment Act, 1941
21	War Damage Insurance Act, 1941
22	Factories, Machinery and Building Work Act, 1941
23	Census, Delimitation and Electoral Act, 1941
24	Miners' Phthisis Amendment Act, 1941
25	Higher Education (Amendment) Act, 1941
26	Railways and Harbours Pensions Amendment Act, 1941
27	Durban Railway Agreement Act, 1941
28	Asiatics (Transvaal Land and Trading) Amendment Act, 1941
29	New Motor Car Sales Tax Act, 1941
30	Workmen's Compensation Act, 1941
31	Income Tax Act, 1941
32	Pensions (Supplementary) Act, 1941
33	Railways and Harbours Appropriation Act, 1941
34	Iron and Steel Industry Amendment Act, 1941
35	Cape Mortgage Bonds Validation Act, 1941
36	Appropriation Act, 1941
37	Active Service Voters Act, 1941
38	Land Bank Amendment Act, 1941
39	Building Societies (Amendment) Act, 1941
40	Precious Stones Amendment Act, 1941
41	Judges' Act, 1941
42	Patents (Amendment) Act, 1941
43	Finance Act, 1941
44	Customs and Excise Amendment Act, 1941
45	War Pensions Act, 1941
46	Special Taxation Act, 1941

== 1942 ==
Act no.	Short title
1	Additional Appropriation Act, 1942
2	Provincial Councils Continuance Act, 1942
3	Higher Education (Amendment) Act, 1942
4	Railways and Harbours Unauthorized Expenditure Act, 1942
5	Railways and Harbours Additional Appropriation Act, 1942
6	Incorporated Law Society of the Orange Free State Further Amendment (Private) Act, 1942
7	Diocesan College Rondebosch (Private) Act, 1942
8	Suid-Afrikaanse Akademie vir Wetenskap en Kuns (Private) Act, 1942
9	Railways and Harbours Part Appropriation Act, 1942
10	Part Appropriation Act, 1942
11	Cape Pensions Amendment Act, 1942
12	Unauthorized Expenditure (1940–1941) Act, 1942
13	Companies Amendment Act, 1942
14	Public Health Acts Amendment Act, 1942
15	Mineral Law Amendment Act, 1942
16	Stock Theft Amendment Act, 1942
17	Unemployment Benefit Amendment Act, 1942
18	Land Bank Amendment Act, 1942
19	Second Additional Appropriation Act, 1942
20	Railways and Harbours Management Amendment Act, 1942
21	Civil Imprisonment Restriction Act, 1942
22	Wage Amendment Act, 1942
23	Death Duties Amendment Act, 1942
24	Building Societies (Amendment) Act, 1942
25	War Damage Insurance Amendment Act, 1942
26	Customs Amendment Act, 1942
27	Industrial Development Amendment Act, 1942
28	Messina–Limpopo Railway (Supplementary Agreement) Act, 1942
29	Motor Vehicle Insurance Act, 1942
30	Electoral Quota Consolidation Act, 1942
31	Patents Further Amendment Act, 1942
32	Iron and Steel Industry Amendment Act, 1942
33	Rents Act, 1942
34	Income Tax Act, 1942
35	Naturalization and Status of Aliens Amendment Act, 1942
36	Hire-Purchase Act, 1942
37	Appropriation Act, 1942
38	Banking Act, 1942
39	Base Minerals Amendment Act, 1942
40	Special Taxation Act, 1942
41	Finance Act, 1942
42	Native Administration Amendment Act, 1942 (before 1964); Bantu Administration Amendment Act, 1942 (from 1964 to 1978); Black Administration Amendment Act, 1942 (after 1978)
43	Pensions (Supplementary) Act, 1942
44	War Pensions Act, 1942
45	Excise Act, 1942
46	Natural Oil Act, 1942
47	Railways and Harbours Appropriation Act, 1942

== 1943 ==
Act no.	Short title
1	Additional Appropriation Act, 1943
2	Railways and Harbours Unauthorized Expenditure Act, 1943
3	Higher Education Amendment Act, 1943
4	Unauthorized Expenditure (1941–1942) Act, 1943
5	Births, Marriages and Deaths Registration Amendment Act, 1943
6	Second Additional Appropriation Act, 1943
7	Vocational and Special Schools Amendment Act, 1943
8	Farm Mortgage Interest Amendment Act, 1943
9	Part Appropriation Act, 1943
10	Oliphants River Irrigation Works Act, 1943
11	Railways and Harbours Additional Appropriation Act, 1943
12	Railways and Harbours Part Appropriation Act, 1943
13	Railway Construction Act, 1943
14	Railway Fire Damage Compensation Act, 1943
15	Jury Lists Suspension Act, 1943
16	Insolvency Law Amendment Act, 1943
17	Matrimonial Causes Jurisdiction Amendment Act, 1943
18	Prescription Act, 1943
19	Offices of Profit Amendment Act, 1943
20	Electoral Laws Amendment Act, 1943
21	Native Administration (Amendment) Act, 1943 (before 1964); Bantu Administration (Amendment) Act, 1943 (from 1964 to 1978); Black Administration (Amendment) Act, 1943 (after 1978)
22	Railway Passengers Tax Act, 1943
23	Excise Amendment Act, 1943
24	Customs Amendment Act, 1943
25	Bills of Exchange Amendment Act, 1943
26	Income Tax Act, 1943
27	Insurance Act, 1943
28	Building Societies Amendment Act, 1943
29	Electricity Amendment Act, 1943
30	Adoptions Validation Act, 1943
31	Special Taxation Amendment Act, 1943
32	Pensions (Supplementary) Act, 1943
33	Pension Laws Amendment Act, 1943
34	War Service Voters Act, 1943
35	Trading and Occupation of Land (Transvaal and Natal) Restriction Act, 1943
36	Land Bank Amendment Act, 1943
37	Finance Act, 1943
38	Housing Acts Amendment Act, 1943
39	Appropriation Act, 1943
40	Railways and Harbours Appropriation Act, 1943

== 1944 ==
Act no.	Short title
1	Additional Appropriation Act, 1944
2	Agricultural Schools Transfer Amendment Act, 1944
3	Part Appropriation Act, 1944
4	Unauthorized Expenditure (1942–1943) Act, 1944
5	Interpretation Amendment Act, 1944
6	Railways and Harbours Unauthorized Expenditure Act, 1944
7	Mental Disorders Amendment Act, 1944
8	Indian Marriages Validation Act, 1944
9	Diplomatic Immunities and Asiatic Land Tenure Amendment Act, 1944
10	Provincial Powers Extension Act, 1944
11	Rand Water Board Statutes (1903–1938) Amendment (Private) Act, 1944
12	Second Additional Appropriation Act, 1944
13	Land Bank Act, 1944
14	Railways and Harbours Additional Appropriation Act, 1944
15	Railways and Harbours Part Appropriation Act, 1944
16	Railways and Harbours Management Amendment Act, 1944
17	Financial Adjustments Act, 1944
18	Vaal River Development Scheme (Amendment) Act, 1944
19	Board of Trade and Industries Act, 1944
20	General Council Employees' Transfer Act, 1944
21	Irrigation Districts Adjustment Act, 1944
22	National Roads and Ribbon Development Amendment Act, 1944
23	Railways and Harbours Acts Amendment Act, 1944
24	Stamp Duties Amendment Act, 1944
25	Children's (Amendment) Act, 1944
26	Excise Amendment Act, 1944
27	Public Servants (Military Service) Act, 1944
28	South-West Africa Affairs Amendment Act, 1944
29	South African Reserve Bank Act, 1944
30	Irrigation Amendment Act, 1944
31	Attorneys' Admission (Military Service) Act, 1944
32	Magistrates' Courts Act, 1944
33	Death Duties Amendment Act, 1944
34	Banking Amendment Act, 1944
35	Customs Act, 1944
36	Native Laws Amendment Act, 1944 (before 1964); Bantu Laws Amendment Act, 1944 (from 1964 to 1978); Black Laws Amendment Act, 1944 (after 1978)
37	Apprenticeship Act, 1944
38	Railway Construction Act, 1944
39	Special Taxation Act, 1944
40	Soldiers and War Workers Employment Act, 1944
41	Medical, Dental and Pharmacy Act Amendment Act, 1944
42	Land Settlement Amendment Act, 1944
43	Pensions (Supplementary) Act, 1944
44	Fishing Industry Development Act, 1944
45	Nursing Act, 1944
46	Finance Act, 1944
47	Income Tax Act, 1944
48	Pension Laws Amendment Act, 1944
49	Housing Amendment Act, 1944
50	Railways and Harbours Appropriation Act, 1944
51	Appropriation Act, 1944

== 1945 ==
Act no.	Short title
1	Additional Appropriation Act, 1945
2	Military Service Act, 1945
3	Anatomy Amendment Act, 1945
4	Unauthorized Expenditure (1943–1944) Act, 1945
5	Second Additional Appropriation Act, 1945
6	Railways and Harbours Unauthorized Expenditure Act, 1945
7	Railways and Harbours Additional Appropriation Act, 1945
8	Part Appropriation Act, 1945
9	Railways and Harbours Part Appropriation Act, 1945
10	Rand Water Board Statutes (1903–1944) Amendment (Private) Act, 1945
11	The Durban Waterworks (Private) Act, Amendment (Private) Act, 1945
12	Reformatories, Industrial and Vocational Schools Service Act, 1945
13	Publication of Banns Amendment Act, 1945
14	Biennial Registration of Voters Suspension Act, 1945
15	Kamanassie Irrigation District Adjustment Act, 1945
16	Railways and Harbours Acts Amendment Act, 1945
17	Railway Construction Act, 1945
18	Public Service Amendment Act, 1945
19	Insurance (Amendment) Act, 1945
20	Stamp Duties Amendment Act, 1945
21	Sea Fisheries Amendment Act, 1945
22	Excise Amendment Act, 1945
23	Saldanha Bay Water Supply Act, 1945
24	Standards Act, 1945
25	Natives (Urban Areas) Consolidation Act, 1945 (before 1964); Bantu (Urban Areas) Consolidation Act, 1945 (from 1964 to 1978); Blacks (Urban Areas) Consolidation Act, 1945 (after 1978)
26	Road Transportation Boards Service Act, 1945
27	Workmen's Compensation Amendment Act, 1945
28	Precious Stones Amendment Act, 1945
29	Native Education Finance Act, 1945
30	Dental Mechanicians Act, 1945
31	Public Servants (Military Service) Amendment Act, 1945
32	Customs Amendment Act, 1945
33	Scientific Research Council Act, 1945
34	Registration for Employment Act, 1945
35	Matrimonial Causes Jurisdiction Act, 1945
36	Incorporated Law Society of Natal Amendment (Private) Act, 1945
37	Special Taxation Amendment Act, 1945
38	Financial Relations Consolidation and Amendment Act, 1945
39	Income Tax Act, 1945
40	Electoral Laws Amendment Act, 1945
41	Census Amendment Act, 1945
42	Pensions (Supplementary) Act, 1945
43	Natives (Urban Areas) Amendment Act, 1945
44	Native Reserves (South West Africa) Act, 1945 (before 1964); Bantu Reserves (South West Africa) Act, 1945 (from 1964 to 1978); Black Reserves (South West Africa) Act, 1945 (after 1978)
45	Housing (Emergency Powers) Act, 1945
46	Finance Act, 1945
47	Railways and Harbours Appropriation Act, 1945
48	Appropriation Act, 1945

== 1946 ==
Act no.	Short title
1	Additional Appropriation Act, 1946
2	Railways and Harbours Unauthorized Expenditure Act, 1946
3	Merchandise Marks Amendment Act, 1946
4	Part Appropriation Act, 1946
5	Second Additional Appropriation Act, 1946
6	Unauthorized Expenditure (1943–1945) Act, 1946
7	Coloured Persons Settlement Act, 1946
8	Railways and Harbours Part Appropriation Act, 1946
9	Railways and Harbours Additional Appropriation Act, 1946
10	Electoral Laws Amendment Act, 1946
11	Railways and Harbours Service and Superannuation (Amendment) Act, 1946
12	Nursing Amendment Act, 1946
13	Mental Disorders Amendment Act, 1946
14	Medical, Dental and Pharmacy Amendment Act, 1946
15	Dairy Control Board Employees' Transfer Act, 1946
16	Companies Amendment Act, 1946
17	Carriage by Air Act, 1946
18	Higher Education Amendment Act, 1946
19	Wool Act, 1946
20	Excise Amendment Act, 1946
21	South Africa Act Amendment Act, 1946
22	Financial Relations Amendment Act, 1946
23	Wine and Spirits Control Amendment Act, 1946
24	Blind Persons Amendment Act, 1946
25	Banking Institutions Act, 1946
26	Standards Amendment Act, 1946
27	Deep Level Mining Research Institute Act, 1946
28	Asiatic Land Tenure and Indian Representation Act, 1946 (before 1948); Asiatic Land Tenure Act, 1946 (after 1948)
29	Customs Amendment Act, 1946
30	Stamp Duties Amendment Act, 1946
31	Licences Amendment Act, 1946
32	Government Service Pensions Amendment Act, 1946
33	Building Societies Amendment Act, 1946
34	South African Mint Amendment Act, 1946
35	Exchequer and Audit Amendment Act, 1946
36	Disability Grants Act, 1946
37	N'Jelele Irrigation District Adjustment Act, 1946
38	Irrigation Amendment Act, 1946
39	Admission of Advocates Amendment Act, 1946
40	Railway Construction Act, 1946
41	Aviation Amendment Act, 1946
42	Natives (Urban Areas) Amendment Act, 1946 (before 1964); Bantu (Urban Areas) Amendment Act, 1946 (from 1964 to 1978); Blacks (Urban Areas) Amendment Act, 1946 (after 1978)
43	Old Age and Veteran's Pensions Amendment Act, 1946
44	Iron and Steel Industry Amendment Act, 1946
45	Soil Conservation Act, 1946
46	Electoral Consolidation Act, 1946
47	Silicosis Act, 1946
48	Removal of Restrictions in Townships Act, 1946
49	Livestock and Meat Industries Amendment Act, 1946
50	Marketing Amendment Act, 1946
51	Public Health Amendment Act, 1946
52	Aliens Affairs Amendment Act, 1946
53	Unemployment Insurance Act, 1946
54	Special Taxation Amendment Act, 1946
55	Income Tax Act, 1946
56	Pensions (Supplementary) Act, 1946
57	Finance Act, 1946
58	War Pensions Laws Amendment Act, 1946
59	Appropriation Act, 1946
60	Railways and Harbours Appropriation Act, 1946

== 1947 ==
Act no.	Short title
1	Board of Trade and Industries Amendment Act, 1947
2	Additional Appropriation Act, 1947
3	Cape Supreme Court Constitution Amendment Act, 1947
4	Railways and Harbours Additional Appropriation Act, 1947
5	Part Appropriation Act, 1947
6	Dongola Wild Life Sanctuary Act, 1947
7	Stock Exchanges Control Act, 1947
8	Commissions Act, 1947
9	Railways and Harbours Appropriation Act, 1947
10	Second Additional Appropriation Act, 1947
11	Children's (Amendment) Act, 1947
12	Jury Lists Amendment Act, 1947
13	Railways and Harbours Unauthorized Expenditure Act, 1947
14	Unauthorized Expenditure (1945–1946) Act, 1947
15	Higher Education Amendment Act, 1947
16	Silicosis Amendment Act, 1947
17	War Pensions Laws Amendment Act, 1947
18	Unit Trusts Control Act, 1947
19	Patents, Designs and Trade Marks Amendment Act, 1947
20	Iron and Steel Industry Amendment Act, 1947
21	Precious Stones Amendment Act, 1947
22	Natal Mines Amendment Act, 1947
23	Klipdrift Settlement Act, 1947
24	Skanskop Settlement Act, 1947
25	Banking Amendment Act, 1947
26	Orchards and Cultivated Plants Cleansing Act, 1947
27	Excise Amendment Act, 1947
28	Government Service Pensions Amendment Act, 1947
29	Special Taxation Amendment Act, 1947
30	War Measures Repeal Act, 1947
31	Disability Grants Amendment Act, 1947
32	Railway Construction Act, 1947
33	Dental Mechanicians Amendment Act, 1947
34	Agricultural Produce Export Amendment Act, 1947
35	Wool Amendment Act, 1947
36	Fertilizers, Farm Feeds, Seeds and Remedies Act, 1947 (before 1962); Fertilizers, Farm Feeds and Remedies Act, 1947 (from 1962 to 1970); Fertilizers, Farm Feeds, Agricultural Remedies and Stock Remedies Act, 1947 (after 1970)
37	Vyfhoek Management Amendment Act, 1947
38	Customs Amendment Act, 1947
39	Defence Amendment Act, 1947
40	Welfare Organizations Act, 1947
41	Provincial Powers Extension Act, 1947
42	Aviation Amendment Act, 1947
43	Cable and Wireless Workers Transfer Act, 1947
44	Electricity Amendment Act, 1947
45	Native Laws Amendment Act, 1947 (before 1964); Bantu Laws Amendment Act, 1947 (from 1964 to 1978); Black Laws Amendment Act, 1947 (after 1978)
46	City of Durban Savings and Housing Department (Private) Act, 1947
47	Pensions (Supplementary) Act, 1947
48	Finance Act, 1947
49	Liquid Fuel and Oil Act, 1947
50	Reserved Minerals Development Amendment Act, 1947
51	Natural Resources Development Act, 1947
52	Income Tax Act, 1947
53	Rents Amendment Act, 1947
54	South African Tourist Corporation Act, 1947
55	Precious and Base Metals Amendment Act, 1947
56	Appropriation Act, 1947

== 1948 ==
Act no.	Short title
1	Stock Exchanges Control Amendment Act, 1948
2	United Kingdom Gold Loan Act, 1948
3	Additional Appropriation Act, 1948
4	University of Natal (Private) Act, 1948
5	The Durban Waterworks (Private) Act, Further Amendment (Private) Act, 1948
6	Removal of Restrictions in Townships Amendment Act, 1948
7	Rents Amendment Act, 1948
8	Work Colonies Amendment Act, 1948
9	Special Schools Act, 1948 (before 1960); Special Education Act, 1948 (after 1960)
10	Forest Amendment Act, 1948
11	Disability Grants Amendment Act, 1948
12	Housing Amendment Act, 1948
13	Railways and Harbours Additional Appropriation Act, 1948
14	Railways and Harbours Appropriation Act, 1948
15	Second Additional Appropriation Act, 1948
16	Powers and Privileges of Provincial Councils Act, 1948
17	Royal Style and Titles Act, 1948
18	War Measures Continuation Act, 1948
19	Standards Amendment Act, 1948
20	Treaties of Peace Act, 1948
21	Vaal River Development Scheme Amendment Act, 1948
22	Hartebeestpoort Irrigation Scheme (Crocodile River) Amendment Act, 1948
23	Land Settlement Amendment Act, 1948
24	Pensions (Supplementary) Act, 1948
25	Members of Parliament Act, 1948
26	Part Appropriation Act, 1948
27	Customs Amendment Act, 1948
28	Finance Act, 1948
29	Geneva General Agreement on Tariffs and Trade Act, 1948
30	Second Part Appropriation Act, 1948
31	Buffelspoort Irrigation Scheme Act, 1948
32	Marketable Securities Tax Act, 1948
33	Unauthorized Expenditure (1946–1947) Act, 1948
34	Railways and Harbours Unauthorized Expenditure Act, 1948
35	Atomic Energy Act, 1948
36	Judges' Salaries and Pensions Amendment Act, 1948
37	Criminal Procedure Amendment Act, 1948
38	Special Taxation Amendment Act, 1948
39	Appropriation Act, 1948
40	Income Tax Act, 1948
41	Pension Laws Amendment Act, 1948
42	Railway Construction Act, 1948
43	Prince Edward Islands Act, 1948
44	Transport (Co-ordination) Act, 1948
45	Railways and Harbours Second Additional Appropriation Act, 1948
46	Second Pensions (Supplementary) Act, 1948
47	Asiatic Laws Amendment Act, 1948
48	War Measures Further Continuation Act, 1948
49	Second Finance Act, 1948
50	Electoral Law Amendment Act, 1948

== 1949 ==
Act no.	Short title
1	Aliens Registration Amendment Act, 1949
2	Deputy-Administrators Act, 1949
3	Welfare Organizations Amendment Act, 1949
4	Cape of Good Hope Savings Bank Society Act, 1949
5	Additional Appropriation Act, 1949
6	Soil Conservation Amendment Act, 1949
7	Irrigation Commission Repeal Act, 1949
8	Financial Relations Amendment Act, 1949
9	Incorporated Law Society of the Orange Free State Further Amendment (Private) Act, 1949
10	Admission of Advocates Amendment Act, 1949
11	Rand Water Board Statutes 1903–1945 Amendment (Private) Act, 1949
12	Coloured Mission Stations and Reserves Act, 1949
13	Railways and Harbours Additional Appropriation Act, 1949
14	Broadcasting Amendment Act, 1949
15	Rhodes University (Private) Act, 1949
16	Railways and Harbours Unauthorized Expenditure Act, 1949
17	Unauthorized Expenditure (1947–1948) Act, 1949
18	Part Appropriation Act, 1949
19	Second Additional Appropriation Act, 1949
20	Railways and Harbours Part Appropriation Act, 1949
21	University of the Orange Free State (Private) Act, 1949
22	Attorneys, Notaries and Conveyancers Admission Amendment Act, 1949
23	South-West Africa Affairs Amendment Act, 1949
24	Bospoort Irrigation Scheme Act, 1949
25	Work Colonies Act, 1949
26	Aliens Affairs Amendment Act, 1949
27	Electricity Amendment Act, 1949
28	Prevention of Cruelty to Animals Amendment Act, 1949
29	Dongola Wild Life Sanctuary Repeal Act, 1949
30	Railways and Harbours Appropriation Act, 1949
31	Indian Immigration Bureau Transfer Act, 1949
32	Fuel Research Institute and Coal Amendment Act, 1949
33	National Finance Corporation Act, 1949
34	Irrigation Amendment Act, 1949
35	Pension Laws Amendment Act, 1949
36	Workmen's Compensation Amendment Act, 1949
37	Scientific Research Council Amendment Act, 1949
38	Prohibition of Sports Pools Act, 1949
39	Customs Amendment Act, 1949
40	Transfer Duty Act, 1949
41	Unemployment Insurance Amendment Act, 1949
42	Land Settlement Amendment Act, 1949
43	Defence Amendment Act, 1949
44	South African Citizenship Act, 1949
45	Income Tax Act, 1949
46	Pensions (Supplementary) Act, 1949
47	Finance Act, 1949
48	Appropriation Act, 1949
49	Railways and Harbours Acts Amendment Act, 1949
50	Motor Carrier Transportation Amendment Act, 1949
51	Air Services Act, 1949
52	Public Servants (Temporary Employees) Act, 1949
53	Asiatic Land Tenure Amendment Act, 1949
54	General Law Amendment Act, 1949
55	Prohibition of Mixed Marriages Act, 1949
56	Native Laws Amendment Act, 1949 (before 1964); Bantu Laws Amendment Act, 1949 (from 1964 to 1978); Black Laws Amendment Act, 1949 (after 1978)
57	Housing Amendment Act, 1949
58	Sea Fisheries Amendment Act, 1949
59	Undue Restraint of Trade Act, 1949
