= Pension Funds Amendment Act, 2024 =

South African law

The Pension Funds Amendment Act, 2024 is a legislative measure passed by the Parliament of South Africa aimed at modernising the country’s pension fund framework. It amends the Pension Funds Act of 1956, as well as other related statutes, to introduce new benefits, improve fund governance, and ensure alignment with other laws. The Act's most notable provisions include the introduction of a savings withdrawal benefit, updated definitions of pension fund components, and enhanced protections for fund members and their dependents.

== Background ==
The Pension Funds Act of 1956 has been one of the cornerstones of South Africa's financial regulatory system. It governs the operation and management of pension funds, which serve as critical financial safety nets for retirees and their families. However, over the decades, changing economic conditions, societal expectations, and global financial trends have necessitated periodic revisions to the legislation.

The 2024 amendments were introduced in response to:

- A growing demand for flexibility in accessing retirement savings, particularly in times of personal financial crises.
- The need to align pension fund operations with other key legislation, including the Income Tax Act, Divorce Act, and Tax Administration Act.
- Feedback from industry stakeholders highlighting gaps in the existing regulatory framework, particularly concerning equitable treatment during divorces and the need for clear delineation of fund components.

== Objectives ==
The Pension Funds Amendment Act, 2024, aims to:

1. Provide fund members with controlled access to a portion of their savings before retirement through the savings withdrawal benefit.
2. Promote financial fairness and compliance during marital asset distribution in divorce cases.
3. Protect pension savings from mismanagement, ensuring their primary purpose—providing for retirement—is upheld.
4. Streamline fund governance, ensuring better oversight and adaptability to members’ needs.

== Key provisions ==
1. Introduction of the Savings Withdrawal Benefit

The most prominent feature of the Act is the introduction of the savings withdrawal benefit, which allows members to access a portion of their accumulated savings in the savings component. This measure provides financial relief during emergencies, subject to strict regulations to prevent abuse.

2. Definition of Fund Components

To ensure transparency and consistent management, the Act delineates three key components of a member’s pension savings:

- Retirement Component: Funds strictly reserved for retirement, which cannot be accessed early.
- Savings Component: Accessible under specific conditions defined by the savings withdrawal benefit.
- Vested Component: Accumulated prior benefits with unique rules governing their treatment.

These definitions improve clarity for fund members and administrators.

3. Alignment with Divorce Proceedings

The Act provides a detailed framework for handling pension interests in divorce cases, ensuring compliance with the Divorce Act. Pension interests are recognised as part of the marital estate and are subject to division upon dissolution of marriage.

Key highlights include:

- The ability for non-member spouses to claim portions of pension savings based on court orders.
- Clarity on how such claims are calculated and processed by pension funds.
- Ensuring that claims do not jeopardise the member’s minimum retirement reserve.

4. Updated Deduction Provisions

The Act specifies allowable deductions from members' accounts, including:

- Tax obligations as per the Income Tax Act and Tax Administration Act.
- Payments under court-ordered maintenance obligations.
- Repayment of loans or guarantees provided by the pension fund.

This section also establishes a hierarchy for processing competing claims, prioritising maintenance payments to dependents over other deductions.

5. Enhanced Protections for Pension Funds

To safeguard retirement savings, the Act prohibits members from using their benefits as collateral for loans, except in narrowly defined circumstances. Additionally, funds may temporarily suspend withdrawals or deductions if ongoing legal disputes could impact fund integrity.

6. Governance and Compliance

The Act empowers the relevant regulatory authorities to oversee fund compliance and enforce penalties for violations. It also mandates regular reporting and actuarial assessments to ensure financial sustainability and member protection.

== See also ==
- Acts of the Parliament of South Africa
