= Alma Mekondjo Nankela =

Namibian archaeologist

- Born: Kwanza-Sul, Angola
- Education: University of Ferrara; University of Namibia; École du Muséum National d'Histoire Naturelle
- Scientific career
- Fields: Archaeology in Namibia; Rock Art Research
- Workplaces: National Heritage Council of Namibia
- Thesis: Rock Art and Landscape: An empirical analysis in the content, context and distribution of the rock art sites in Omandumba East and West, Erongo Region-Namibia (2017)
- Doctoral advisor: David Pleurdeau, Luiz Oosterbeek, François Sémah

Alma Mekondjo Nankela is a Namibian archaeologist. She worked as a specialist at the National Heritage Council of Namibia until 2021.

== Early life and education ==
Nankela was born in exile in Kwanza-Sul, Angola, during Namibia's liberation struggle. The daughter of a clinical pathologist and physician, her parents worked alongside Nickey Iyambo at Cambuta Health Centre in Cuanza-Sul and returned to Namibia just before independence. Nankela studied for a bachelor's degree in history and geography at the University of Namibia and later earned joint international master's and doctorate degrees in Quaternary and Prehistory from the University of Ferrara and the Museum National d’Histoire Naturelle de Paris between 2011 and 2017.

== Research ==
Nankela works on archaeology of the Brandberg, Erongo Mountains, Twyfelfontein World Heritage Site, Spitzkoppe Mountains, Sperrgebiet, Khuiseb Delta, Etosha and Kalahari Basin. She has also assisted the National Museum of Namibia in relations to policy development, preservation, curation and management of archaeological objects, repatriated human remains.

Her most notable discovery to date has been the April 2008 find of a 16th century Portuguese shipwreck in Oranjemund. In 2013, Nankela secured funding of $10,000 from the American Ambassador’s Fund for Cultural Preservation (AFCP) through the American Embassy in Windhoek, towards the restoration of the Spitzkoppe heritage sites in Erongo region. In 2014, Nankela secured European Union funding for the scientific research of archaeological heritage in Erongo Mountains, Namibia. In 2016, Nankela was runner up for researcher of the year by the National Commission on Research, Science and Technology of Namibia.

== Selected works ==
- 2021. A Namibian Experience: The contentious Politics of repatriation of human remains and sacred objects. https://www.museumsbund.de/wp-content/uploads/2021/07/dmb-leitfaden-umgang-menschl-ueberr-en-web-20210625.pdf
- 2021. Data pretreatment and multivariate analyses for ochre sourcing: Application to Leopard Cave (Erongo, Namibia).https://www.academia.edu/44978722/Data_pretreatment_and_multivariate_analyses_for_ochre_sourcing_Application_to_Leopard_Cave_Erongo_Namibia
- 2020. Calcium oxalate radiocarbon dating: preliminary tests to date rock art of decorated open-air caves of Erongo Mountains in Namibia.Cambridge University Press. https://www.cambridge.org/core/journals/radiocarbon/article/abs/calcium-oxalate-radiocarbon-dating-preliminary-tests-to-date-rock-art-of-the-decorated-openair-caves-erongo-mountains-namibia/8F368D23986E0AE6C45F65197F6055F1
- 2020. Rock art in Namibia.Encyclopedia of global archaeology. http://link-springer-com-443.webvpn.fjmu.edu.cn/referenceworkentry/10.1007%2F978-3-030-30018-0_3429
- 2017. Rock art and Landscape: an empirical Analysis in the content, context and distribution of the rock art sites in Omandumba East and West, Erongo Region-Namibia. PhD Thesis, Paris, Muséum national d'histoire naturelle en cotutelle.
- 2016. Alma Nankela and Helke Mocke. "Fossil Freshwater Molluscs from Simanya in the Kalahari System, Northern Namibia", Communications of the Geological Survey of Namibia 17, p. 66-84.https://www.academia.edu/25575341/Fossil_Freshwater_Molluscs_from_Simanya_in_the_Kalahari_System_Northern_Namibia
- 2016. Style, techniques and graphic expression of Omandumba Rock Art Sites in Erongo Mountain, Namibia.publication description. British Archaeological Reports S2787.
- 2015. Rock art of Omandumba Farms in Erongo Mountain, Namibia.ATELIER Etno. https://www.academia.edu/23962103/Rock_art_when_why_and_to_whom_Rock_Art_of_Omandumba_Farm_in_Erongo_Mountain_Namibia2015. Rock Art Research in Namibia: a Synopsis." Africana Studia, Vol. 24 Issue 1, p. 39-56. https://www.africabib.org/rec.php?RID=A00003831
- 2014. Rock Art and cultural Identity formation in Namibia: reference to Twyfelfontein world heritage site. In Identities and Diversities: Ethnicity and Gender, edited by Lins, et alii, pp. 143-174.
- 2012. The Landscape Setting of the Rock Arts Sites in Kunene Region, Namibia." In Landscape within rock art, edited by L. Oosterbeek and G. Nash. Centro de Pré-Historia do Instituto Politécnico (CEIPHAR), Tomar.
