= Railways and Harbours Service Act, 1912 =

South African act of Parliament

The South African Railways and Harbours Service Act, 1912 made striking by railway employees punishable by fine or imprisonment.
