= Natural and Historical Monuments Act, 1923 =

1923 South African law establishing and protecting historical monuments and objects

Parliament of South Africa
- Long title: To make provision for the preservation of natural and historical monuments of the Union and of objects of aesthetic, historical or scientific value or interest.
- Citation: Act No. 6 of 1923
- Enacted by: Parliament of South Africa
- Royal assent: 26 March 1923
- Commenced: 10 April 1923
- Administered by: Governor-General

Repealed by
- Natural and Historical Monuments, Relics and Antiquities Act of 1934
- Status: Repealed

The Natural and Historical Monuments Act, 1923 was a South African Act creating a Historical Monuments Commission whose members would identity and seek to take ownership of natural and historical monuments so as to preserve them and prevent further impairment. A monument could be defined as land or scenery of distinctive beauty, fauna, flora or objects, have scientific or historical value and also included waterfalls, caves, bushman paintings, trees and buildings.

== Content of the Act ==
The following is a brief description of the sections of the Natural and Historical Monuments Act, 1923:

=== Definitions and interpretation ===
Section 1

Defines that the Governor-General establish a commission called the Commission for the Preservation of Natural and Historical Monuments of the Union; of no more than seven members; unpaid duties; a chairman and a deputy chosen by the members with the chairman having a casting vote and the names of the members of the commission would be published in the Government Gazette.

Section 2

Defines the commission as a body corporate and subject to laws that govern such a body.

Section 3

Defines that the funds of the commission can include donations, fees and annual subscriptions. Donations need publishing annually in the Government Gazette.

Section 4

Defines the duties of the commission as establish a register of monuments it believes should be preserved; establish who owns the monument; purchase a monument to preserve or prevent its impairment if funds are available and become a trustee of any monument if requested by a person or gifted or bequeath to the state.

Section 5

Defines the restrictions to the power of what a commission can do as a trustee of a monument.

Section 6

Defines the powers of the Governor-General to make regulations to set procedures for the commission's meetings, the members qualifications, the period they hold office for and other matters required to carry out the commission.

Section 7

Defines the commissions powers to make by-laws, subject to the approval of the Governor-General, such as regulating to access monuments, fix entrance fees and safeguard monuments from damage.

Section 8

Defines what the word monument means in relation to the Act.

Section 9

Defines the short title of the Act.
