= Military Veterans Act, 2011 =

Parliament of South Africa
- Citation: Act No. 18 of 2011
- Enacted by: Parliament of South Africa
- Assented to: 2 December 2011
- Signed: 16 August 2011
- Commenced: 1 April 2012
- Status: In force

The Military Veterans Act, 2011 (Act No. 18 of 2011) is an act of the Parliament of South Africa that declares the government responsible for governing the affairs of the country's military veterans. It also outlines the benefits available to these veterans and names the President of South Africa as their patron-in-chief. The Act further establishes an Advisory Council on Military Veterans and the Military Veterans Appeals Board. The Act was passed by Parliament on 16 August 2011 and was assented to by President Jacob Zuma on 2 December 2011.

== Aims of the Act ==
The purpose of the act is to recognise and honour military veterans for the sacrifices that they have made on behalf of the nation. It also aims to assist military veterans to transition from active service to civilian life. The Act further aims to assist disabled veterans and to improve the quality of life of military veterans and their dependants. Furthermore, it aims to provide benefits and services to the veterans and ensure that they can contribute to the development of the country. Lastly the act aims to contribute to nation building and reconciliation in the country.

== Military Veterans and their Benefits ==
A military veteran is defined by the act as "a South African citizen who rendered military service to any of the military organisations, which were involved on all the sides of South Africa’s liberation war from 1960 to 1994, those who served in the Union Defence Force before 1961 and those who became members of the South African National Defence Force after 1994, and have completed their military training and no longer perform military duties, and have not been dishonourably discharged from that military organisation".

In February 2014 it was reported that the Department of Military Veterans would remove about 16,000 names from its list of military veterans as the department had decided that the Act did not apply to former conscripts of the South African Defence Force, and could only apply to those who served in the "old defence force" if they were permanent and professional soldiers. The South African Legion of Military Veterans has disputed this interpretation of the act.

Subject to their eligibility for benefits, the Act allows for the compensation of veterans who, as a result of their military service, suffer from a disability or terminal illness, or who have sustained severe psychological and neuro-psychiatric trauma. The veterans are entitled to access healthcare, while they, as well as their dependants, are entitled to counselling and treatment for serious mental illnesses. The Act also allows for the honouring of fallen veterans.

The veterans are also entitled to assistance with finding employment and securing business opportunities. The veterans and their dependants are entitled to a pension, education, skills development and training. The veterans are further entitled to housing, burial support and the provision of, or subsidisation of, public transport.

Section 5(3)(b) of the act requires that all organs of state assist in providing and paying for these benefits.

== National Military Veterans' Association ==
The National Military Veterans' Association was established by the Act as an umbrella organisation to represent all the organisations serving veterans at a national level. Veteran organisations were given the right to not be a member of the national association.

The association was set up to advise the Minister, if so required, on policy and legislation matters, and the Minister and Director-General on other matters relating to military veterans.

From 29 September to 2 October 2013, delegates representing about 600 military associations held a conference in Boksburg to discuss the formation of the national association in regard to the act. The council was established in October 2013 with a president and six executive members representing Umkhonto we Sizwe (2 members on the executive), the Council of Military Veterans Organisations, the former Bophuthatswana Defence Force, Azanian National Liberation Army, and the Azanian People's Liberation Army. The first president of the Association was Kebby Maphatsoe.

== Advisory Council on Military Veterans ==
The act establishes an Advisory Council on Military Veterans that is responsible to the Minister. It can advise the Minister on policy matters that relate to military veterans. It further is allowed at the request of the Minister or Director-General, or on its own initiative, to make recommendations or give advice on all matters that concern the veterans or their dependants. A report from the council to the minister is tabled in Parliament annually.

The council consists of a chairperson and between 10 and 15 members appointed by the Minister. An employee of the department, or the Director-General, also serves on the council. At least half of the members of the council must be military veterans. Members of the council serve for a term of five years. Members can be reappointed to the council by the Minister at the end of their term.

== Military Veterans Appeal Board ==
The act establishes a Military Veterans Appeal Board that is empowered to consider appeals lodged with regard to decisions that have been taken in terms of this act that affect veteran rights. They can further consider questions of law put before them by the Director-General and advise the Director-General in regard to legal matters relating to military veterans. The board is able to set aside, confirm or substitute any decision taken in terms of this act.

The board has the power to summon individuals for questioning and the power to request the appearance of any document that they feel has a bearing on a matter under their consideration. They can administer an oath as well as accept an affirmation from a witness and are able to interrogate as a witness, any person present at the boards proceedings.

Decisions are determined by the majority finding of the board which consists of three individuals appointed by the Minister in consultation with the National Military Veterans' Association. At least one of the members of the board is required to be an attorney with a minimum of 10 years of experience in the practice of law. The members may not serve more than two consecutive terms on the board.
