= Native Laws Amendment Act, 1949 =

The Native Laws Amendment Act, passed by the South African Parliament in 1949, created special labour bureaux for Africans. This was designed to restrict the flow of workers to the towns.
