= South African Language Practitioners' Council Act, 2014 =

Parliament of South Africa
- Citation: Act No. 8 of 2014
- Enacted by: Parliament of South Africa
- Enacted: 4 March 2014
- Assented to: 16 May 2014
- Status: In force

The South African Language Practitioners' Council Act, 2014 (Act No. 8 of 2014); is an act of the Parliament of South Africa that established regulations for the training, regulation, accreditation and control of language practitioners so as to set standards for the quality of translators and interpreters. It also established the South African Language Practitioners' Council. The act further set out the objects, powers, duties and functions of the council and determined how the council would be managed, governed, staffed and financed. The bill was enacted by parliament on 4 March 2014 and was assented to by President Jacob Zuma on 16 May 2014.

== South African Language Practitioners' Council ==
The second chapter of the act establishes the South African Language Practitioners' Council. The council is required to advance the promotion and protection of language practice in the country. It is also empowered to advise the minister of sport, arts and culture on any matters affecting the language profession.

The council needs to accredit people who are accreditable and register people who are registrable to the council as well as scrutinise the particulars of those wishing to register. It is required to set up a code of conduct for the practitioners. The act further gives the council the powers to revise and implement this code of conduct. The council is also given the empowered by the act to protect the professional interests of language practitioners as well as the members of the public who make use of their services. It is further given the power to regulate the services that those members of the public obtain.

The council is required to promote and provide the means for people, especially from indigenous communities, to enter and participate in the sector.

Chapter three of the act establishes the board of the council. The board must consist of eight to twelve members. Members are appointed by the minister of sport, arts and culture. Board members may be appointed for terms of up to five years and reappointed until they have served continuously for ten years. The members of the board are also required, in consultation with the minister, to appoint a chief executive officer who, under the provisions of section 16 in chapter 4 of the act, is an ex officio member without voting rights.
