= Bushman-Relics Protection Act, 1911 =

1911 South African law on protecting Bushman relics

Parliament of South Africa
- Long title: To provide for the protection of Bushman relics.
- Citation: Act No. 22 of 1911
- Enacted by: Parliament of South Africa
- Royal assent: 25 April 1911
- Commenced: 12 May 1911
- Administered by: Minister of Interior

Repealed by
- Natural and Historical Monuments, Relics and Antiquities Act of 1934
- Status: Repealed

The Bushman-Relics Protection Act, 1911 was a South African Act to protect drawings, paintings, petrographs created by San people or other aboriginals obtained from graves, caves, rock-shelters and shell-mounds from being removed from the Republic without a permit being issued.

== Content of the Act ==
The following is a brief description of the sections of the Bushman-Relics Protection Act, 1911:

=== Definitions and interpretation ===
Section 1

Defines the explanations of keywords in the Act as to what a Bushman-relic is and who is the Minister responsible.

Section 2

Defines that a Bushman-relic cannot be removed from the Republic without a written permit from the Minister, and what documents are needed to accompany the application for a permit.

Section 3

Defines the penalties if found guilty of an offence as a fine of a maximum of £50 or imprisonment of up to 3 months on failure to pay the fine.

Section 4

Defines the Governor-general's ability to make regulations to carry out the object of Act.

Section 5

Defines the name of the Act.
