= List of heritage sites in North West =

This is a list of the heritage sites in the North West province of South Africa, as recognized by the South African Heritage Resources Agency.

SAHRA identifier	Site name	Description	Town	District	NHRA status	Coordinates	Image
9/2/103/0003	Tiger Kloof, Waterloo 730, District Vryburg	School building, constructed in 1905, closed due to the effect of apartheid legislation in 1963, and reopened in 1995.		Vryburg	Provincial Heritage Site	27°03′20″S 24°45′20″E	Upload Photo
9/2/103/0004	Old Police Station, 9 Vry Street, Vryburg	Type of site: Police Station Current use: Residential: House. The Old Police Station is probably the earliest remaining building in Vryburg, and almost intact an example of an early humble public building erected at the time that the town was established. The building was sold to MC Genis the magistrate of the Boer	Vryburg	Vryburg	Provincial Heritage Site	26°57′37″S 24°43′49″E	Upload Photo
9/2/103/0005	Dutch Reformed Church Parsonage, 85 Vry Street, Vryburg	Fine Victorian residence with complex roof, forward projecting bay on one side, and truncated corner at the church council meeting held on 3 June 1911 it was decided "die tyd gekomen is om en nieuw Pastorie te bouwen". Two erven were bought from J West for £550 and the parsonage built thereon. The parsonage was completed at a total cost of £2,792 5s of w Architectural style: Edwardian. Type of site: Parsonage Current use: Residential: House. Intrinsic aesthetic/architectural merit.	Vryburg	Vryburg	Register	26°57′37″S 24°43′49″E	Upload Photo
9/2/103/0007	St Stephens Anglican Church, MacKenzie Street, Vryburg	Rectangular form church building with semi-circular baptistry addition at the rear. Original roofing Consecrated in 1891. Regularly attended by soldiers during the Anglo-Boer War Type of site: Church Current use: Religious: Church. Outstanding aesthetic/architectural merit	Vryburg	Vryburg	Provincial Heritage Site	26°57′21″S 24°44′16″E	Upload Photo
9/2/212/0003	Preller House, Rondavelhouse and Cemetery, Pelindaba, Brits District	This dwelling, consisting of three stone rondavels, was built by Gustav Preller in 1920 and was initially used as a week-end residence. Dr Preller also placed the rondavels at the disposal of Afrikaans writers and artists. Type of site: Cemetery, House. Gustav Preller, the well-known protagonist of Afrikaans, historian and journalist built and occupied this house from 1935 until his death. Many of his later historical works were completed in this house. This dwelling, consisting of three stone rondavel		Brits	Provincial Heritage Site	25°47′56″S 27°54′25″E	This dwelling, consisting of three stone rondavels, was built by Gustav Preller in 1920 and was initially used as a week-end residence. Dr Preller also placed the rondavels at the disposal of Afrikaans writers and artists. Type of site: Cemetery, House. Gustav Preller, the well-known protagonist of Afrikaans, historian and journalist built and occupied this house from 1935 until his death. Many of his later historical works were completed in this house. This dwelling, consisting of three stone rondavel Media related to Preller cemetery at Wikimedia Commons
9/2/212/0005	Historical Houses, Karee Road, Brits	Type of site: House.	Brits	Brits	Provisional Protection	25°38′04″S 27°46′52″E	Upload Photo
9/2/212/0006	Fourie House No. 1, De Kroon, Brits District			Brits	Plaque	25°39′19″S 27°47′52″E	Upload Photo
9/2/212/0016	Gondolin, Broederstroom 481 JQ, North West	Gondolin Cave is a hominin-bearing fossil site comprising a cave and a series of mined limestone deposits, forming a part of the Cradle of Humankind UNESCO World Heritage Site.		Brits	National Heritage Site	26°02′57″S 28°05′17″E	Upload Photo
9/2/212/0017	Preller House, Main House, Welgegund, Pelindaba, Brits District	Type of site: House. Gustav Preller, the well-known protagonist of Afrikaans, historian and journalist built and occupied this house from 1935 until his death. Many of his later historical works were completed in this house. This dwelling, consisting of three stone rondavel		Brits	Provincial Heritage Site	25°47′56″S 27°54′25″E	Type of site: House. Gustav Preller, the well-known protagonist of Afrikaans, historian and journalist built and occupied this house from 1935 until his death. Many of his later historical works were completed in this house. This dwelling, consisting of three stone rondavel Media related to Preller house at Wikimedia Commons
9/2/218/0003	Dutch Reformed Church, Delarey Street, Delareyville	Type of site: Church.	Delareyville	Delareyville	Provincial Heritage Site	26°41′12″S 25°27′28″E	Upload Photo
9/2/231/0001	Wood and Iron Houses 13 and 15 Convent Avenue, Klerksdorp	Type of site: Residence.	Klerksdorp	Klerksdorp	Provincial Heritage Site	26°52′00″S 26°40′00″E	Type of site: Residence.
9/2/231/0002	Fountain Villa, Hendrik Potgieter Street, Klerksdorp	Type of site: House.	Klerksdorp	Klerksdorp	Provincial Heritage Site	26°52′11″S 26°39′12″E	Type of site: House.
9/2/231/0003	Railway Station, Delver Street, Klerksdorp	This railway station building was completed in 1897 by the Nederlandsche Zuid-Afrikaansche Spoorweg-Maatchappij and is one of only a few elegant station buildings erected by the NZASM. For approximately nine years the Klerksdorp Station remained the west Type of site: Railway Station. This railway station building was completed in 1897 by the Nederlandsche Zuid-Afrikaansche Spoorweg-Maatschappij and is one of only a few elegant station buildings erected by the NZASM. For approximately nine years the Klerksdorp Station remained the west	Klerksdorp	Klerksdorp	Provincial Heritage Site	26°52′11″S 26°39′54″E	This railway station building was completed in 1897 by the Nederlandsche Zuid-Afrikaansche Spoorweg-Maatchappij and is one of only a few elegant station buildings erected by the NZASM. For approximately nine years the Klerksdorp Station remained the west Type of site: Railway Station. This railway station building was completed in 1897 by the Nederlandsche Zuid-Afrikaansche Spoorweg-Maatschappij and is one of only a few elegant station buildings erected by the NZASM. For approximately nine years the Klerksdorp Station remained the west Media related to Klerksdorp station at Wikimedia Commons
9/2/231/0009	Nederduits Gereformeerde Mother Church, Anderson Street, Klerksdorp	Type of site: Church.	Klerksdorp	Klerksdorp	Provincial Heritage Site	26°52′03″S 26°39′58″E	Type of site: Church.
9/2/231/0012	Farmhouse, Renosterspruit, Klerksdorp District	Type of site: Farm Complex. This simple farmhouse was built immediately after 1903 by Jakobus Badenhost who participated in the Anglo-Boer War (1899–1902) and whose original house was burnt down during the war. Therefore the house stands as a symbol of the above-mentioned war and c		Klerksdorp	Register	27°02′08″S 26°30′24″E	Upload Photo
9/2/235/0005	Nerderduitse Gereformeerde Church, 27 Gerrit Maritz Street, Lichtenburg	The corner stone of this stone building was laid on 14 June 1890. In 1928, under the direction of Gerhard Moerdyk, the building was substantially enlarged and the striking portico and spire were added. During the Anglo-Boer War (1899–1902) the building w Type of site: Church. The corner stone of this stone building was laid on 14 June 1890. In 1928, under the direction of Gerhard Moerdyk, the building was substantially enlarged and the striking portico and spire were added. During the Anglo-Boer War (1899–1902) the building w	Lichtenburg	Lichtenburg	Provincial Heritage Site	26°08′57″S 26°09′54″E	Upload Photo
9/2/235/0008	Historic cattle dip, Elandsputte, Lichtenburg District	In December 1924, during the construction of this cattle-dip, Mr J. A. Voorendyk discovered a diamond which led to the further discovery of diamonds on Elandsputte (a portion of Uitgevonden) and the eventual spectacular "diamond rushes" on Elandsputte in1 Type of site: Cattle Dip. In December 1924, during the construction of this cattle-dip, Mr J. A. Voorendyk discovered a diamond which led to the further discovery of diamonds on Elandsputte (a portion of Uitgevonden) and the eventual spectacular "diamond rushes" on Elandsputte in1		Lichtenburg	Provincial Heritage Site	25°58′26″S 26°05′46″E	Upload Photo
9/2/235/0012	Dutch Reformed Church, Ottosdal	Type of site: Church.	Ottosdal	Lichtenburg	Register	26°49′15″S 26°00′21″E	Upload Photo
9/2/235/0014	Ou Plaas Guest House, Holfontein 147, Lichtenburg District	Type of site: House. This house attaches its significance from the fact that it is the only remnant of the builder Scribante in the Lichtenburg District that dates immediately after the Anglo-Boer War (1899–1902). Furthermore, it satisfies the criteria for the declaration of		Lichtenburg	Register	26°49′31″S 26°00′10″E	Upload Photo
9/2/238/0002	Bokkraal, Marico District			Marico	Provisional Protection	25°49′02″S 26°27′56″E	Upload Photo
9/2/238/0006-001	Church of St John the Baptist, Zeerust, Marico District	This Church was built in 1873. It was the third Anglican Church to be built in the Transvaal and is the oldest still standing. Type of site: Church. This Church was built in 1873. It was the third Anglican Church to be built in the Transvaal and is the o1dest still standing.	Zeerust	Marico	Provincial Heritage Site	25°32′00″S 26°05′00″E	Upload Photo
9/2/238/0012	Kaditshwene Cultural landscape (ruins)	STATEMENT OF SIGNIFICANCE Kaditshwene is historically considered a capital of the Bahurutshe nation and the largest Batswana settlement in Southern Africa with a population of 16000 to 20000, around the early 1800s. The large population of Kaditshwene i	Northe West, Zeerust	Marico	National Heritage Site	25°20′30″S 26°10′05″E	Upload Photo
9/2/238/0015	Water mill, Malmani Eye, Marico District	This water-wheel and mill of cast iron is one of only a few water-mills in the Transvaal which have been preserved in situ. It was probably erected sometime between 1900 and 1910 and is representative of the last type of mills in South Africa that operate Type of site: Water Mill. This water-wheel and mill of cast iron is one of only a few water-mills in the Transvaal which have been preserved in situ. It was probably erected sometime between 1900 and 1910 and is representative of the last type of mills in South Africa that operate		Marico	Provincial Heritage Site	25°49′32″S 26°02′58″E	Upload Photo
9/2/256/0001	Old powder magazine, Wolmarans Street, Potchefstroom	This powder magazine was erected between 1841 and 1863 and is as such one of the oldest existing buildings in Potchefstroom. This stone building played an important role from the time of its construction, especially during the First War of Independence. Type of site: Powder Magazine. This powder magazine was erected between 1841 and 1863 and is as such one of the oldest existing buildings in Potchefstroom. This stone building played an important role from the time of its construction, especially during the First War of Independence.	Potchefstroom	Potchefstroom	Provincial Heritage Site	26°42′56″S 27°05′09″E	Upload Photo
9/2/256/0002	74 James Moroka Ave (old street name:Lombard Street), Potchefstroom	Type of site: Residence.	Potchefstroom	Potchefstroom	Provincial Heritage Site	26°46′36″S 26°50′59″E	Type of site: Residence. Media related to 74 James Moroka Avenue, Potchefstroom at Wikimedia Commons
9/2/256/0003	76 James Moroka Ave (old street name:Lombard Street), Potchefstroom	Type of site: Residence.	Potchefstroom	Potchefstroom	Provincial Heritage Site	26°46′36″S 26°50′59″E	Type of site: Residence. Media related to 76 James Moroka Avenue, Potchefstroom at Wikimedia Commons
9/2/256/0004	72 James Moroka Ave (old street name:Lombard Street), Potchefstroom		Potchefstroom	Potchefstroom	Provincial Heritage Site	26°46′36″S 26°50′59″E	Media related to 72 James Moroka Avenue, Potchefstroom at Wikimedia Commons
9/2/256/0005	Old Berlin Mission Station, Sol Plaatjie Ave (old street name:Gouws Street), Potchefstroom	Type of site: Mission Station. This building-complex is one of the rare and most important historical building complexes ever to be found in Potchefstroom. This mission station was established in 1872 by Pastor CW Moschutz of the Berlin Mission Society and presently creates the most i	Potchefstroom	Potchefstroom	Provincial Heritage Site	26°42′52″S 27°05′49″E	Upload Photo
9/2/256/0007-001	House of President M W Pretorius, Thabo Mbeki Drive (old street name:Van der Hoff Avenue), Potchefstroom	In the course of the second half of the nineteenth century Marthinus Wessel Pretorius played a very important role in the history of the Zuid-Afrikaansche Republiek and the Republic of the Orange Free State. After the death of his father, A. W. J. Pretori Type of site: House. Marthinus Wessel Pretorius, Commandant-General of Rustenburg and Potchefstroom (1853–1857), State President of the South African Republic (1857-1860 and 1964-1871), State President of the Republic of the Orange Free State (1860–1863) and member of the Tri	Potchefstroom	Potchefstroom	Provincial Heritage Site	26°41′34″S 27°05′51″E	In the course of the second half of the nineteenth century Marthinus Wessel Pretorius played a very important role in the history of the Zuid-Afrikaansche Republiek and the Republic of the Orange Free State. After the death of his father, A. W. J. Pretori Type of site: House. Marthinus Wessel Pretorius, Commandant-General of Rustenburg and Potchefstroom (1853–1857), State President of the South African Republic (1857-1860 and 1964-1871), State President of the Republic of the Orange Free State (1860–1863) and member of the Tri
9/2/256/0008	Old Fort and Cemetery, Potchefstroom	An old earth fort and a cemetery. (A stone monument in memory of the siege victims was erected in the adjoining cemetery.) This old earthwork or fort is situated a few hundred metres south of the Potchefstroom railway station. Its origin is a mystery, for when it became of historical importance during the First Transvaal War of Independence, it was already old. In 1877 Great Type of site: Fort, Cemetery.	Potchefstroom	Potchefstroom	Provincial Heritage Site	26°42′59″S 27°05′10″E	An old earth fort and a cemetery. (A stone monument in memory of the siege victims was erected in the adjoining cemetery.) This old earthwork or fort is situated a few hundred metres south of the Potchefstroom railway station. Its origin is a mystery, for when it became of historical importance during the First Transvaal War of Independence, it was already old. In 1877 Great Type of site: Fort, Cemetery. Media related to Old Fort and Cemetery, Potchefstroom at Wikimedia Commons
9/2/256/0010	Dutch Reformed Church, Church Street, Potchefstroom	This fine old church of the Nederduits Hervormde congregation of Potchefstroom, the first Voortrekker congregation in the Transvaal, stands on Church Square opposite the Town Hall in the heart of the town. Towards the end of 1838 Commandant A. H. Potgiete Type of site: Church. This fine church is the second church building of the "Voortrekker congregation of Transvaal" of the Dutch Reformed (Nederduits Hervormde) Church. The church was taken into use on 24 February 1866.	Potchefstroom	Potchefstroom	Provincial Heritage Site	26°42′36″S 27°05′52″E	This fine old church of the Nederduits Hervormde congregation of Potchefstroom, the first Voortrekker congregation in the Transvaal, stands on Church Square opposite the Town Hall in the heart of the town. Towards the end of 1838 Commandant A. H. Potgiete Type of site: Church. This fine church is the second church building of the "Voortrekker congregation of Transvaal" of the Dutch Reformed (Nederduits Hervormde) Church. The church was taken into use on 24 February 1866. Media related to Dutch Reformed Church, Potchefstroom at Wikimedia Commons
9/2/256/0011	Old Police Station, Greyling Street, Potchefstroom	Type of site: Police Station.	Potchefstroom	Potchefstroom	Provincial Heritage Site	26°42′51″S 27°05′44″E	Type of site: Police Station.
9/2/256/0012	Old Post Office, Greyling Street, Potchefstroom	Type of site: Post Office.	Potchefstroom	Potchefstroom	Provincial Heritage Site	26°42′51″S 27°05′44″E	Type of site: Post Office.
9/2/256/0014	Oak Avenue, Potchefstroom	This oak avenue was planted in about 1910 and lends to the streets along which it is situated both dignity and aesthetic character. Type of site: Avenue, Tree. This oak avenue was planted in about 1910 and lends to the streets along which it is situated both dignity and aesthetic character.	Potchefstroom	Potchefstroom	Provincial Heritage Site	26°42′52″S 27°05′49″E	This oak avenue was planted in about 1910 and lends to the streets along which it is situated both dignity and aesthetic character. Type of site: Avenue, Tree. This oak avenue was planted in about 1910 and lends to the streets along which it is situated both dignity and aesthetic character. Media related to Oak Avenue, Potchefstroom at Wikimedia Commons
9/2/256/0015	St Mary's Anglican Church, Auto Avenue, Potchefstroom	Single storey, square form. Pitched corrugated iron roofsheeting. Claybricks wall, plastered with cl Type of site: House Current use: House. The Anglican church, built in 1890-91, in the Neo-Gothic style, was the first building in Potchefstroom resembling this historic Neo-Gothic style. The parish in Potchefstroom is one of the oldest in the Transvaal.	Potchefstroom	Potchefstroom	Provincial Heritage Site	26°42′45″S 27°05′46″E	Single storey, square form. Pitched corrugated iron roofsheeting. Claybricks wall, plastered with cl Type of site: House Current use: House. The Anglican church, built in 1890-91, in the Neo-Gothic style, was the first building in Potchefstroom resembling this historic Neo-Gothic style. The parish in Potchefstroom is one of the oldest in the Transvaal. Media related to St Mary's Anglican Church, Potchefstroom at Wikimedia Commons
9/2/256/0018	Krugerskraal, Tygerfontein, Potchefstroom District			Potchefstroom	Provincial Heritage Site	26°53′00″S 27°13′00″E	Upload Photo
9/2/256/0020	Town Hall, Potgieter Street, Potchefstroom	Type of site: Town Hall.	Potchefstroom	Potchefstroom	Provincial Heritage Site	26°42′49″S 27°05′29″E	Type of site: Town Hall. Media related to Potchefstroom Town Hall at Wikimedia Commons
9/2/256/0021	Carnegie Library, Walter Sisulu Avenue (old street name:Potgieter Street), Potchefstroom	Type of site: Library.	Potchefstroom	Potchefstroom	Provincial Heritage Site	26°42′49″S 27°05′29″E	Type of site: Library.
9/2/256/0024	Historic Reformed Church Complex, eet, Potchefstroom	In 1905 the Theological School of the Gereformeerde Church was transferred from Burgersdorp to Potchefstroom where from 1905 to 1907 this complex of four buildings was erected to accommodate the Theological School and its subsections, the professor and th Type of site: Church Complex. In 1905 the Theological School of the Gereformeerde Church was transferred from Burgersdorp to Potchefstroom where from 1905 to 1907 this complex of four buildings was erected to accommodate the Theological School and its subsections, the professor and th	Potchefstroom	Potchefstroom	Provincial Heritage Site	26°41′37″S 27°05′47″E	In 1905 the Theological School of the Gereformeerde Church was transferred from Burgersdorp to Potchefstroom where from 1905 to 1907 this complex of four buildings was erected to accommodate the Theological School and its subsections, the professor and th Type of site: Church Complex. In 1905 the Theological School of the Gereformeerde Church was transferred from Burgersdorp to Potchefstroom where from 1905 to 1907 this complex of four buildings was erected to accommodate the Theological School and its subsections, the professor and th Media related to Reformed Church Complex, Potchefstroom at Wikimedia Commons
9/2/256/0025	Voortrekker Fort, Elandsfontein, Potchefstroom District	The fort was built of stone and was about 24 m long and 12 m wide with embrasures at the corners to provide enfilading fire. The walls must have been about 1,5 m high. There are two roads that lead to Fochville from the national road between Johannesburg and Potchefstroom. The more southerly of these roads, the main route from Potchefstroom to Fochville, crosses the farm Elandsfontein where the ruins of this Voortrekker Type of site: Fort. According to tradition this stone fort was built by the Voortrekkers under the leadership of Andries Hendrik Potgieter. It was presumably erected in 1842 to serve as a shelter for the women and children in case the men had to leave for Port Natal to assis	Elandsfontein	Potchefstroom	Provincial Heritage Site	26°42′52″S 27°05′49″E	Upload Photo
9/2/256/0028	Old Fire Brigade Station, Kock Street, Potchefstroom	Type of site: Civic.	Potchefstroom	Potchefstroom	Provisional Protection	26°42′59″S 27°05′18″E	Type of site: Civic.
9/2/256/0030	Potchefstroom Agricultural College, Potchefstroom	Both the Administration Building, which was the first building of the Potchefstroom College of Agriculture to be erected and which was occupied in 1907, and the Selborne Hall in which the Africander Cattle Breeders' Society was established in 1912, are cl Type of site: Educational. Both the Administration Building, which was the first building of the Potchefstroom College of Agriculture to be erected and which was occupied in 1907, and the Selborne Hall in which the Africander Cattle Breeders' Society was established in 1912, are cl	Potchefstroom	Potchefstroom	Provincial Heritage Site	26°42′55″S 27°05′47″E	Upload Photo
9/2/256/0031	Old Reformed Church, Maury Avenue, Potchefstroom	The Gereformeerde Congregation of Potchefstroom is one of the first seven congregations of the Gereformeerde Kerk founded in 1859 in the Rustenburg area, Transvaal; In July of the same year the church congregation petitioned the government of the then Zu Type of site: Church. This small church with its Gothic Features was erected between 1865 and 1866. It was designed by Rev. Dirk Postma, first minister of the Gereformeerde Kerk in South Africa. It is one of the first churches built by the Gereformeerde Kerk. This simple w	Potchefstroom	Potchefstroom	Provincial Heritage Site	26°42′21″S 27°05′47″E	The Gereformeerde Congregation of Potchefstroom is one of the first seven congregations of the Gereformeerde Kerk founded in 1859 in the Rustenburg area, Transvaal; In July of the same year the church congregation petitioned the government of the then Zu Type of site: Church. This small church with its Gothic Features was erected between 1865 and 1866. It was designed by Rev. Dirk Postma, first minister of the Gereformeerde Kerk in South Africa. It is one of the first churches built by the Gereformeerde Kerk. This simple w
9/2/256/0032	W D Pretorius House, Church Street, Potchefstroom		Potchefstroom	Potchefstroom	Provincial Heritage Site	26°42′36″S 27°05′52″E	Upload Photo
9/2/256/0033	Heimat, Potchefstroom University for Christian Higher Education, Potchefstroom	Both these buildings represent important milestones in the history of the development of the Potchefstroomse Universiteit vir Christelike Hoer Onderwys. The neo-Cape Dutch building known as Heimat, designed by Gerard Moerdijk and completed as a students' Type of site: Educational. Both these buildings represent important milestones in the history of the development of the Potchefstroomse Universiteit vir Christelike Hoer Onderwys. The neo-Cape Dutch building known as Heimat, designed by Gerard Moerdijk and completed as a students'	Potchefstroom	Potchefstroom	Provincial Heritage Site	26°42′52″S 27°05′49″E	Upload Photo
9/2/256/0034	Old Magistrate's Office, Greyling Street, Potchefstroom	Type of site: Magistrates Office.	Potchefstroom	Potchefstroom	Provincial Heritage Site	26°42′51″S 27°05′44″E	Type of site: Magistrates Office.
9/2/256/0035	Goetz-Fleischack House, Sol Plaatjie Ave (old street name:Gouws Street), Potchefstroom	The restored Goetz-Fleischack House was erected for A M. Goetz, Resident Magistrate of Potchefstroom, between 1860 and 1863 and is today the only so-called Karroo-style house in Potchefstroom that has maintained its original appearance. Together with the Type of site: House Previous use: Residential. Current use: Museum. The restored Goetz-Fleischack House was erected for A M. Goetz, Resident Magistrate of Potchefstroom, between 1860 and 1863 and is today the only so-called Karroo-style house in Potchefstroom that has maintained its original appearance. Together with the	Potchefstroom	Potchefstroom	Provincial Heritage Site	26°42′52″S 27°05′49″E	The restored Goetz-Fleischack House was erected for A M. Goetz, Resident Magistrate of Potchefstroom, between 1860 and 1863 and is today the only so-called Karroo-style house in Potchefstroom that has maintained its original appearance. Together with the Type of site: House Previous use: Residential. Current use: Museum. The restored Goetz-Fleischack House was erected for A M. Goetz, Resident Magistrate of Potchefstroom, between 1860 and 1863 and is today the only so-called Karroo-style house in Potchefstroom that has maintained its original appearance. Together with the
9/2/256/0037	Superintendent's Residence, Witrand Care and Rehabilitation Centre, Potchefstroom	This house was erected after the Anglo-Boer War as the official residence for the officer commanding the British garrison at Potchefstroom, and formed part of the military cantonments there. It is an important link with Potchefstroom's military past and s Type of site: Residence. This house was erected after the Anglo-Boer War as the official residence for the officer commanding the British garrison at Potchefstroom, and formed part of the military cantonments there. It is an important link with Potchefstroom's military past and s	Potchefstroom	Potchefstroom	Provincial Heritage Site	26°42′52″S 27°05′49″E	Upload Photo
9/2/256/0039	Farmstead, Buffelsdoorn, Potchefstroom District	Type of site: Farm Complex. The house which dates from the Transvaal pioneering Era, is of historical importance due to its connection with Philippus Jacobus Wilhelmus Schutte who was the owner of the farm Buffelsdoorn from 1856 until his death in 1873. Schutte was a leading figure		Potchefstroom	Register	26°28′50″S 27°21′54″E	Upload Photo
9/2/256/0040	Roets House, 61 Steve Biko Avenue (old street name:Tom Street), Potchefstroom	The house is vacant at the moment, but the Potchefstroom University intends using it as a laboratory for medical practitioners. Therefore, typoclari due to the building's unique architectural features most especially to its immediate environment the architectural	Potchefstroom	Potchefstroom	Register	26°42′52″S 27°05′49″E	The house is vacant at the moment, but the Potchefstroom University intends using it as a laboratory for medical practitioners. Therefore, typoclari due to the building's unique architectural features most especially to its immediate environment the architectural
9/2/256/0041	The Northern Wing of the Nutrition and Family Ecology Building of the Potchefstroom University				Provincial Heritage Site	26°42′52″S 27°05′49″E	Upload Photo
9/2/256/0042	Rectors Residence, 1 Calderbank Avenue, Potchefstroom	Type of site: Residence. The house which was erected in 1942 and designed by the architect Hugh Roberts, is a landmark in Potchefstroom. Historically it is important for its association with Hugh Calderbank who was the Mayor of Potchefstroom in the early 1940s.	Potchefstroom	Potchefstroom	Register	27°05′45″S 26°40′52″E	Type of site: Residence. The house which was erected in 1942 and designed by the architect Hugh Roberts, is a landmark in Potchefstroom. Historically it is important for its association with Hugh Calderbank who was the Mayor of Potchefstroom in the early 1940s.
9/2/263/0002	Dutch Reformed Church, Fatima Bhayat St (Plein Street), Rustenburg	Construction on this neo-Gothic church building started in 1898, but owing to the outbreak of the Anglo-Boer War the finishing touches could only be done in 1903. During the war the building was used by the British as a hospital and it is alleged that six Type of site: Church. Construction on this neo-Gothic church building started in 1898, but owing to the outbreak of the Anglo-Boer War the finishing touches could only be done in 1903. During the war the building was used by the British as a hospital and it is alleged that six	Rustenburg	Rustenburg	Provincial Heritage Site	25°40′19″S 27°14′43″E	Construction on this neo-Gothic church building started in 1898, but owing to the outbreak of the Anglo-Boer War the finishing touches could only be done in 1903. During the war the building was used by the British as a hospital and it is alleged that six Type of site: Church. Construction on this neo-Gothic church building started in 1898, but owing to the outbreak of the Anglo-Boer War the finishing touches could only be done in 1903. During the war the building was used by the British as a hospital and it is alleged that six
9/2/263/0004	Old Lutheran School (Library), Kroondal, Rustenburg District	Type of site: School. This plain little building was completed early in 1898 as the first permanent school building at Kroondal. Together with the nearby Old Lutheran Church it forms the historical core of the town of Kroondal.		Rustenburg	Provincial Heritage Site	25°39′16″S 27°15′21″E	Type of site: School. This plain little building was completed early in 1898 as the first permanent school building at Kroondal. Together with the nearby Old Lutheran Church it forms the historical core of the town of Kroondal.
9/2/263/0005	Schoch House, Boschdal, Rustenburg district			Rustenburg	Provincial Heritage Site	25°39′16″S 27°15′21″E	Upload Photo
9/2/263/0007	Boekenhoutfontein, Rustenburg District	President Paul Kruger’s house on his farm Boekenhoutfontein still stands on the slope of a tree-covered hill at the foot of the Magaliesberg mountains, 20 km west of Rustenburg. At the end of 1840, several Voortrekkers settled in the fertile valley between. From 1862 to 1903 the farm was the property of State President S. J. P. Kruger. The farm passed to Kruger’s decedents following his death in 1904 and was declared a national monument in 1971. The property was acquired by the Recreation Africa Group some 30 years ago and has since been restored to its former glory. It is now home to the Kedar Heritage Lodge, Conference Centre & Spa and the Paul Kruger Country House Museum.		Rustenburg	Provincial Heritage Site	25°39′16″S 27°15′21″E	President Paul Kruger’s house on his farm Boekenhoutfontein still stands on the slope of a tree-covered hill at the foot of the Magaliesberg mountains, 20 km west of Rustenburg. At the end of 1840, several Voortrekkers settled in the fertile valley between. From 1862 to 1903 the farm was the property of State President S. J. P. Kruger. The farm passed to Kruger’s decedents following his death in 1904 and was declared a national monument in 1971. The property was acquired by the Recreation Africa Group some 30 years ago and has since been restored to its former glory. It is now home to the Kedar Heritage Lodge, Conference Centre & Spa and the Paul Kruger Country House Museum.
9/2/263/0008	Old Lutheran Church, Kroondal, Rustenburg district	Since 1889 Kroondal has been the centre of the Hermannsburg Missionary Society's activities in South Africa and construction on this quaint eclectic church started in 1895. It was the first church building at Kroondal and was inaugurated on 24 June 1896. Type of site: Church. Since 1889 Kroondal has been the centre of the Hermannsburg Missionary Society's activities in South Africa and construction on this quaint eclectic church started in 1895. It was the first church building at Kroondal and was inaugurated on 24 June 1896.	Rustenburg	Rustenburg	Provincial Heritage Site	25°39′16″S 27°15′21″E	Since 1889 Kroondal has been the centre of the Hermannsburg Missionary Society's activities in South Africa and construction on this quaint eclectic church started in 1895. It was the first church building at Kroondal and was inaugurated on 24 June 1896. Type of site: Church. Since 1889 Kroondal has been the centre of the Hermannsburg Missionary Society's activities in South Africa and construction on this quaint eclectic church started in 1895. It was the first church building at Kroondal and was inaugurated on 24 June 1896.
9/2/263/0014	Old Anglican Church, Cnr of Oliver Tambo and Beyers Naude Dr (Van Stadens Street), Rustenburg	This Church was reconstructed on its present site in 1967. It was originally built in 1871 as a result of the efforts of John Pilkington Richardson and is one of the oldest Anglican Churches in the Transvaal. Type of site: Church. This Church was reconstructed on its present site in 1967. It was originally built in 1871 as a result of the efforts of John Pilkington Richardson and is one of the oldest Anglican Churches in the Transvaal.	Rustenburg	Rustenburg	Provincial Heritage Site	25°40′14″S 27°14′46″E	This Church was reconstructed on its present site in 1967. It was originally built in 1871 as a result of the efforts of John Pilkington Richardson and is one of the oldest Anglican Churches in the Transvaal. Type of site: Church. This Church was reconstructed on its present site in 1967. It was originally built in 1871 as a result of the efforts of John Pilkington Richardson and is one of the oldest Anglican Churches in the Transvaal.
9/2/263/0016	Syringa Tree Monument, Church Street, Rustenburg	In Rustenburg, in Church Street, just off the main road, there is a sawn-off stump of an ancient syringa tree. Under this tree, on 10 and 11 February 1859, the Reformed Church in South Africa, one of the largest Afrikaans religious organisations, cam Type of site: Tree.	Rustenburg	Rustenburg	Provincial Heritage Site	25°40′05″S 27°14′39″E	In Rustenburg, in Church Street, just off the main road, there is a sawn-off stump of an ancient syringa tree. Under this tree, on 10 and 11 February 1859, the Reformed Church in South Africa, one of the largest Afrikaans religious organisations, cam Type of site: Tree.
9/2/286/0005	Ruins of Rev. Broadbent's House, Leeuwfontein, Wolmaransstad	Wolmaransstad is situated near the south western boundary of the Transvaal; Witpoort lies 16 km to the north east of Wolmaransstad on the road to Leeudoringstad. There, on the northern part of the farm Leeuwdoorn, the first mission station in the Transvaal.		Wolmaransstad	Provincial Heritage Site	27°13′00″S 25°58′00″E	Upload Photo
9/2/286/0006	Thomas Leask House, 46 Broadbent Street, Wolmaransstad	Type of site: House Current use: Guest House. The house derives its historical significance from its association with its previous owner, Thomas Spence Leask, well known as the "Father of Wolmaransstad". The alterations which were made in the 1880s and after 1900 to the original house which was built	Wolmaransstad	Wolmaransstad	Register	27°12′20″S 25°58′53″E	Upload Photo
9/2/501/0015	Cannon, Mafikeng	Mafeking is situated in the northernmost corner of the Cape Province. On rising ground about a kilometre to the south-west of the town there is a very interesting fort known as ""Kanonkoppie"". In 1882 the Boers in this vicinity established two small repu . The Fort on Cannon Kopje was originally built by Sir Charles Warren in 1884. During the Anglo-Boer War it played an important part in the siege of Mafeking.	Mafikeng	Mafikeng	Provincial Heritage Site	25°51′22″S 25°38′25″E	Upload Photo
9/2/501/0016	Warren's Fort, Old Imperial Reserve, Mafikeng	This imposing stone fortification was erected about 1880. The fort played an important role in the Anglo-Boer War. Type of site: Fort. This imposing stone fortification was erected about 1880. The fort played an important role in the Anglo-Boer War.	Mafikeng	Mafikeng	Provincial Heritage Site	25°51′32″S 25°37′44″E	Upload Photo
	Dr Livingstone's House, Marico District	Ruins of the house of Dr. David Livingstone, and a cairn. This is site on which the ruin of Dr. Livingstone's house is situated. It is also where Dr. Livingstone established his second mission station (1846–1847).	Marico	Marico			Upload Photo
	Haasgat, Leeuwenkloof 480 JQ, North West	Current use: Research. This series of fossil sites is one of the most important in the world for the study of human evolution in the context of changing ecological and biological processes. Collectively, they are of national and international significance.		Brits	National Heritage Site		Upload Photo
