= Elandsfontein =

Elandsfontein may refer to:

- Elandsfontein, an archaeological site near Hopefield, South Africa
- Elandsfontein, a farm homestead that is now a suburb of Alberton, South Africa
- Elandsfontein, a Second Boer War concentration camp
- Battle of Elandsfontein, 1881 battle of the First Boer War at Elandsfontein ridge, west of Pretoria
- Elandsfontein Fort, a fort built by the Voortrekkers in South Africa.
