= Hovel =

Hovel is the brick outer shell of a bottle oven.

== See also ==
- Rondavel, literally "round hovel"
