= Burchell's Shelter =

Archaeological site in South Africa

- Interactive map of Burchell's Shelter
- 28°48′58″S 23°43′35″E
- Type: Stone Age shelter
- Periods: Holocene and 19th century
- Location: Campbell, Northern Cape, South Africa

Site notes
- Archaeologists: Anthony Humphreys

Burchell's Shelter is a small rock overhang and archaeological site located in a kloof in the Ghaap Escarpment at Campbell in the Northern Cape, South Africa. As an archaeological site it has a shallow deposit containing late Holocene, mainly nineteenth century remains. Further interest in the shelter derives from the existence of an eyewitness description by the traveller William Burchell of the last Stone Age hunter-gatherers who inhabited the shelter. Hence it presented an opportunity, recognised by archaeologist Anthony Humphreys, to examine the occupation of the shelter from both an historical and an archaeological point of view.

== History ==
Strong springs near the head of the valley – at what would become the village of Campbell – had been noted by the Griqua polity based at Klaarwater (Griquatown) in 1805, but it was not before 1811 that they occupied the place, then known as ‘Knovel Valley'. In that year the missionary the Revd Lambert Jansz, in the company of the traveller William Burchell, took possession of the springs in the name of the London Missionary Society.

During this visit Burchell met and described the inhabitants of the rock shelter in the kloof. As they were soon afterwards absorbed into the community, settling at what became Campbell, Burchell's account is a description of people at the very end of the Stone Age hunter-gatherer phase in this area.
