= Campbell, South Africa =

Campbell
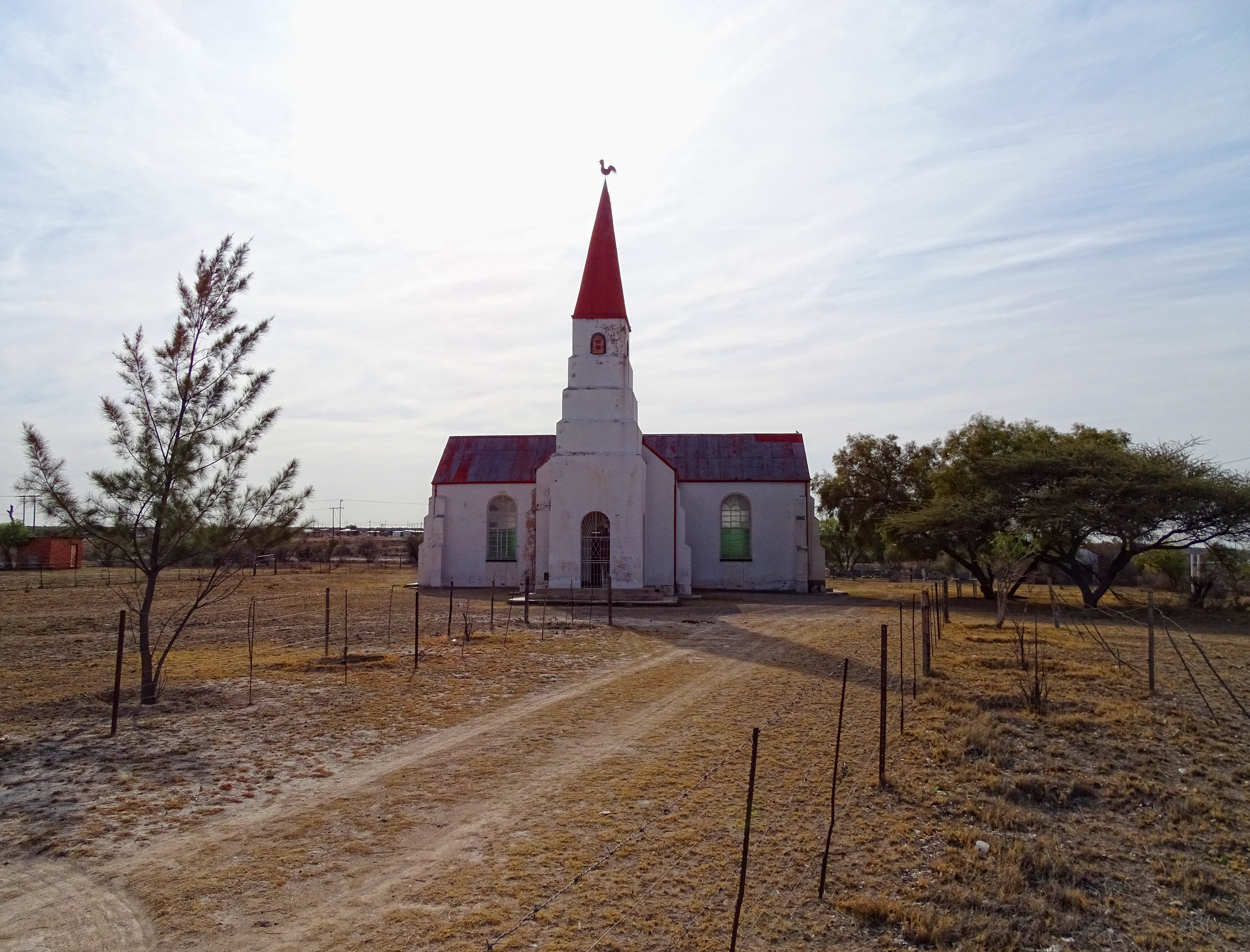
- A church in Campbell

- Location within Northern Cape Location within South Africa
- Coordinates: 28°48′S 23°42′E
- Country: South Africa
- Province: Northern Cape
- District: Pixley ka Seme
- Municipality: Siyancuma

Area
  - Total: 78.35 km^{2} (30.25 sq mi)

Population (2011)
  - Total: 2,179
  - Density: 27.81/km^{2} (72.03/sq mi)

Racial makeup (2011)
  - Black African: 12.1%
  - Coloured: 80.3%
  - Indian/Asian: 1.3%
  - White: 1.2%
  - Other: 5.0%

First languages (2011)
  - Afrikaans: 95.1%
  - English: 1.7%
  - Other: 3.2%
- Time zone: UTC+2 (SAST)
- Postal code (street): 8360
- PO box: 8360

Campbell is a small town situated on the edge of the Ghaap Plateau in the Northern Cape province of South Africa. It is located 48 km (30 mi) east of Griekwastad on the N8 road. It was originally known as Knovel Valley and then Groote Fontein, but was renamed in honour of the Reverend John Campbell who visited the Cape Colony in 1813.

== Origin of the settlement ==
The history of modern settlement of Campbell dates back to 1805 when a group of Griqua, including Captain Andries Waterboer, travelled with missionary Jan Matthys Kok from Klaarwater (now Griquatown) to the territory of the Tswana near the modern town of Kuruman. Encountering strong springs in a valley at the edge of the Ghaap Plateau, they gave the place the name of Knovel Valley, noting its potential for future crop cultivation. It was only in 1811 that the Reverend Lambert Jansz, accompanying the traveller William Burchell, revisited the place, taking possession of the springs, by now known as Groote Fontein (Great Fountain), in the name of the London Missionary Society. Before long the name of the place would be changed again: when the Reverend John Campbell, on a tour of inspection in 1813, reached the nascent village and asked its name, he was told it was Campbell.

In 1816 Cornelis Kok II (1778-1858) was declared Griqua Kaptyn (Captain) of Campbell. Other members of the Kok family had resided there from the beginning of the settlement.

The Reverend John Bartlett was stationed as a missionary at Campbell from 1825 and supervised the construction of a mission church there between 1827 and 1831. Many missionaries and travellers of the nineteenth century passed through the valley and the settlement – including William Burchell, George Thompson, Andrew Smith, Robert Moffat, David Livingstone and G.A. Farini.

== Cornelis Kok II and 34 others re-interred ==
The remains of Cornelis Kok II (1778-1858) were exhumed from a grave, which was threatened by agricultural encroachment, on 19 April 1961, with the intention that the remains should be reburied at the historic precinct near the mission church. Kaptyn Adam Kok IV presided over the disinterment by Prof P.V. Tobias and Dr G.J. Fock, following three years of community consultation by Basil Humphreys. Subsequently, 34 other Griqua skeletons were exhumed by Tobias and his students and all were removed for study at the University of the Witwatersrand. The exhumed remains of Cornelis Kok II and the 34 other Griqua individuals were re-interred alongside the mission church on 23 September 2007. A letter from Phillip Tobias to Adam Kok V was read at the ceremony which was presided over by Northern Cape premier Dipuo Peters.
