= Robert Haldane =

Scottish theologian and religious writer

Robert Haldane, 3rd of Airthrey
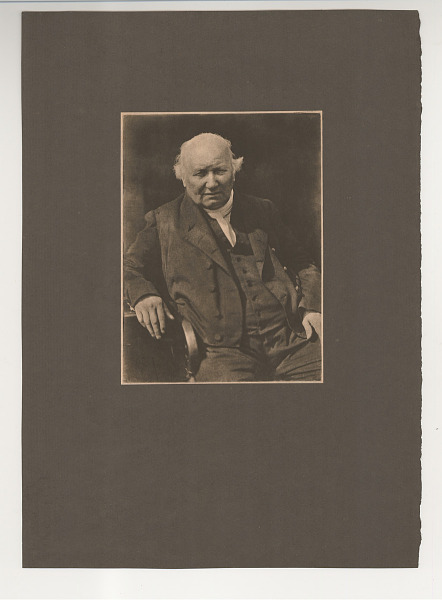
- Robert Haldane in the 1840s
- Born: 28 February 1764; London
- Died: 12 December 1842 (aged 78); Edinburgh
- Education: University of Edinburgh
- Occupation: Scottish theologian
- Years active: 1796–1835
- Known for: Christian evangelization
- Spouse: Catherine Cochrane Oswald
- Children: Margaret Haldane
- Parent(s): James Haldane, 2nd of Airthrey and Katherine Duncan
- Relatives: Helen Haldane (1765-1766) sister James Alexander Haldane (1768-1851) brother

Robert Haldane (28 February 1764 – 12 December 1842) was a religious writer and Scottish theologian. Author of Commentaire sur l'Épître aux Romains, On the Inspiration of Scripture and Exposition of the Epistle to the Romans.

== Early life ==
Robert Haldane 3rd of Airthrey was the son of James Haldane 2nd of Airthrey, and his wife, Katherine Duncan. Robert was born on 28 February 1764 in Queen Anne Street, Cavendish Square in London. Robert and his younger brother James Alexander Haldane were raised by their grandmother Lady Lundie and uncles. Robert and James attended classes at Dundee Grammar School, the Royal High School in Edinburgh, and the University of Edinburgh.

In 1780 Robert joined HMS Monarch as an officer, of which his maternal uncle, Adam Duncan, was in command. In 1781, he was transferred to HMS Foudroyant. He was on HMS Foudroyant under John Jervis during the night engagement in April 1782 with the French ship Pegase and greatly distinguished himself. Haldane was afterwards present at the relief of Gibraltar in September 1782. Some months later after the peace treaty of 1783, he left the Royal Navy.

== Airthrey Estate ==
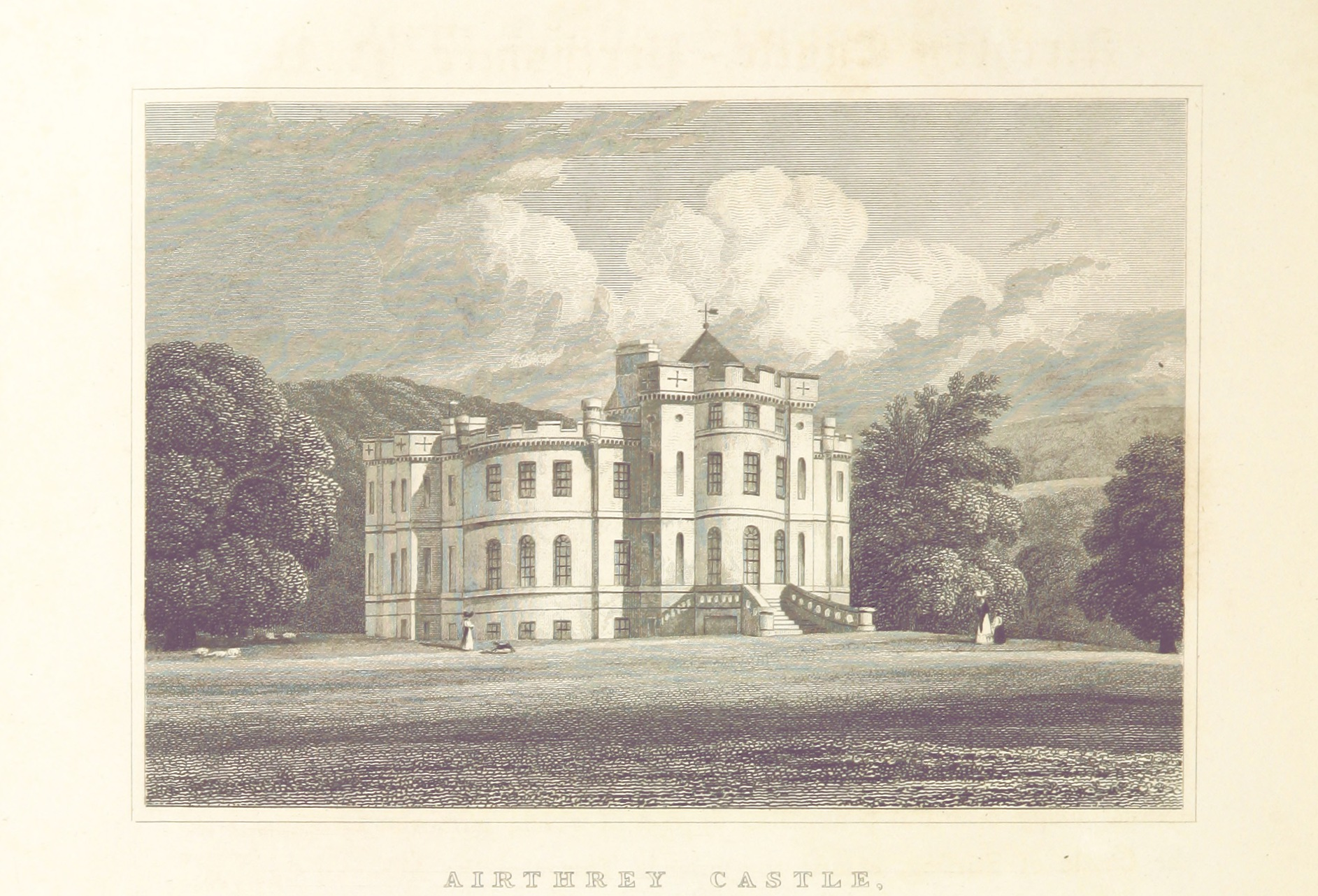
Airthrey Castle from the south-west in 1829, showing the Robert Adam design

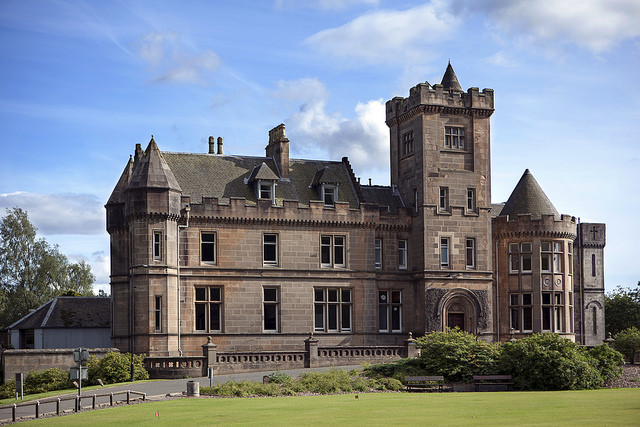
Airthrey Castle, Airthrey Estate, north facade

Soon after leaving the Navy, he settled on his family estate Airthrey, near Stirling where he contacted the Whites of Durham to landscape the grounds. These estate improvements included the creation of a man-made loch, rolling lawns, several wooded plantations, a hermitage and a boundary wall which is nearly four miles in length. In 1790 he commissioned the neoclassical architect Robert Adam to make a draft for the building of Airthrey Castle of which Adam created two designs. Haldane picked his favourite design but chose to have Thomas Russell complete the works instead of Robert Adam. Airthrey Castle was completed in 1791 and as built corresponded largely to the final design by Robert Adam without the forecourt which was never built. Although there were changes to the north facade in the late nineteenth century, the south facade is still essentially as designed by Adam.

== Evangelism ==
Robert's tutor was David Bogue of Gosport. After reading about the start of the French Revolution he grew to disapprove strongly of the war with France. Robert resolved to devote himself to advancing Christianity. In 1795 Robert converted to the evangelical church shortly after his brother James converted. Robert became one of the first members of the London Missionary Society in 1795, the same year that he was converted. He offered the British Government and the East India Company to sell Airthrey Estate in order to set up a vast mission in Bengal but was turned down by the East India Company, and the mission was abandoned.

In December 1797 he also joined his brother and some others in the formation of the "Society for the Propagation of the Gospel at Home," in building chapels or "tabernacles" for congregations, in supporting missionaries, and in maintaining institutions for the education of young men to carry on the work of evangelization. In 1798 he sold the Airthrey Estate to Robert Abercromby to obtain funding for his mission work and with the funds raised to set up the Society for Propagating the Gospel at Home in Edinburgh. In 1799 Robert organised for Plean Estate to be sold and this was bought in 1800 by Francis Simpson.

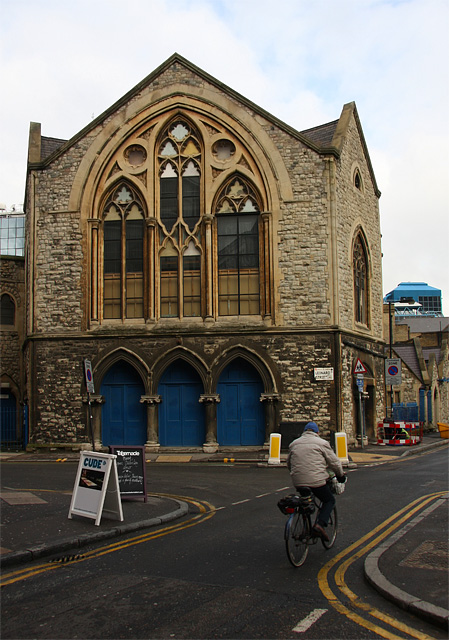
George Whitefield's Tabernacle, Moorfields

Over the next twelve years (1798–1810) he gave over £70,000; this was used to further the cause of the Society for Propagating the Gospel at Home by building chapels for congregations, supporting missionaries and helping to maintain institutions for young men to be educated to carry on the work of evangelization. Robert was inspired by George Whitefield's two tabernacles in London and built preaching centres strategically placed throughout Scotland. These tabernacles were located in Glasgow, Dundee, Perth, Thurso, Wick, Edinburgh and Elgin. His brother James took over the Edinburgh tabernacle until 1851.

Robert funded John Campbell's Society for the Education of Africans which initially planned to evangelise in Africa by bringing over native children to be trained as Christian missionaries in Edinburgh. However, owing to an outbreak of smallpox, the group of children remained in the London area at what became known as the African Academy in Clapham.

From 1799 to 1807, Robert set up theological seminars in Glasgow, Edinburgh and Dundee to train young men with a passion for the gospel. Young men would come and train for 2–3 years with all their expenses paid for. Over this time 300 men were trained and sent out to spread their teachings all over the world.

In 1816 Robert published a work on the Evidences and Authority of Divine Revelation. In the summer of 1816 Robert Haldane visited Europe, first at Geneva and afterwards in Montauban. He lectured and interviewed large numbers of theological students with remarkable effect; among them were César Malan, Frédéric Monod and Jean-Henri Merle d'Aubigné. This circle of men spread the revival of evangelical Protestant Christianity across the continent of Europe (Le Réveil), impacting France, Germany (Die Erweckung) and the Netherlands (Het Reveil). Through conversion and missionary impetus the effects of this revival were felt as far afield as Italy and Hungary.

== Later life ==
In 1819, Robert had his theological prelections published in a Commentaire sur l'Épître aux Romains. He returned to Scotland in 1819 to live partly at the estate he had bought in 1809, Auchengray and partly in Edinburgh at 10 Duke Street (later renamed Dublin Street). Like his brother James, he took part in many of the religious controversies of the time, mainly through correspondence in the newspapers.

Robert's later writing included a number of pamphlets on the Apocrypha controversy, as well as a treatise On the Inspiration of Scripture which was published in 1828 and a later Exposition of the Epistle to the Romans published in 1835, which has been translated into French and German.

Robert died on 12 December in 1842 in Edinburgh and was buried in Glasgow Cathedral.

== Works by Haldane ==
- Address to the public: concerning political opinions, and plans lately adopted to promote religion in Scotland, 1800
- Letters to Mr. Ewing, respecting the Tabernacle at Glasgow, 1809
- Commentaire sur l'Épître aux Romains, 1819
- Review of the conduct of the directors of the British and Foreign Bible Society, relative to the Apocrypha, 1825
- Second review of the conduct of the directors of the British & Foreign Bible Society : containing an account of the religious state of the continent; in answer to a letter addressed to the author, by the Rev. Dr. Steinkopff, 1826
- Exposure of the Rev. Henry Grey's personal misrepresentations, doctrinal heresies, and important mis[s]tatements, respecting the Bible Society, as contained in the letters of Anglicanus, 1828
- On the Inspiration of Scripture, 1828
- The Books of the Old and New Testaments Proved to be Canonical, and their Verbal Inspiration Maintained and Established; with an Account of the Introduction and Character of the Apocrypha, 1830
- Exposition of the Epistle to the Romans, 1835
- The duty of paying tribute enforced; in letters to the Rev. Dr John Brown, 1838
- The Evidence and Authority of Divine Revelation, 1839
- Sanctification of the Sabbath: The Permanent Obligation to Observe the Sabbath or Lord's Day, 1842
- Exposition of the Epistle to the Romans : with remarks on the commentaries of Dr. Macknight, Professor Moses Stuart and Professor Tholuck, 1842

== Family ==
Robert Haldane married Catherine Cochrane Oswald, daughter of George Oswald of Scotstoun, on 24 April 1785. They were married for 58 years and had one child, Margaret Haldane, during their marriage. Margaret married James Farquhar Gordon in 1805.

Robert died on 12 December 1842 (aged 78), Catherine six months afterward. Margaret died on 29 September 1849.

== Church and ministry ==
Along with his brother, James Haldane, Robert Haldane established 85 churches in Scotland and Ireland. Churches planted by the Haldanes practiced baptism by immersion, weekly communion, and congregational polity (autonomous government). The Haldanes also operated a seminary, and were influenced in their principles by other independent thinkers such as John Glas and Robert Sandeman.

== See also ==
- Réveil
