= Society for the Education of Africans =

The Society for the Education of Africans was an English abolitionist organisation which provided for the education of the sons of prominent Africans in the first decade of the nineteenth century.

The Society was led by the Clapham Sect, and founded the African Academy in Clapham in 1799. Soon twenty boys and four girls arrived in Portsmouth from Freetown, Sierra Leone and were placed in the stewardship of Zachary Macaulay. The society also had a significant overlap with the Church Mission Society, which was also founded in 1799, under the name of the Society for Missions to Africa and the East.

The concept was first formulated by John Campbell who recorded his thoughts of 1796 thus:

"Might we not bring over Africa to England; educate her; when some through grace and gospel might be converted, and sent back to Africa,-if not any converted, yet they might help to spread civilization, so all would not be lost"

Campbell's original plan was to set up the school in Edinburgh, and he proceeded to discuss the matter with various friends there, who approved of it. Then he raised the proposal with various members of the Clapham Sect, receiving approval from William Wilberforce and Henry Thornton. However, when he entered into more details discussion with Charles Grant, Grant recommended the plan be deferred until after the war with France was over. Campbell raised the proposal with Robert Haldane, the evangelical philanthropist, who agreed to fund the scheme.
