= John Campbell (missionary) =

Scottish missionary and traveller

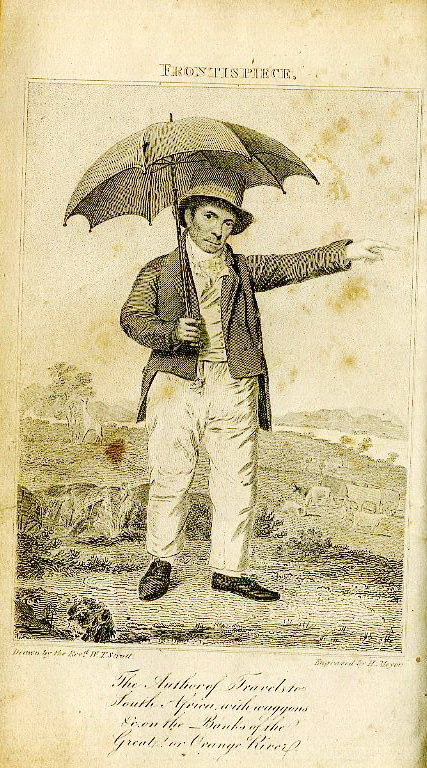
- Born: March 1766; Edinburgh, Scotland
- Died: 4 April 1840 (aged 74); Kingsland, London
- Occupation: Missionary

John Campbell (born March 1766 in Edinburgh, Scotland – 4 April 1840 Kingsland, London), was a Scottish missionary and traveller.

== Life ==
He attended the Royal High School and was at one time apprenticed to a goldsmith. Campbell helped found the Magdalene Society, a Religious Tract Society of Scotland in 1793, and the Missionary Magazine in Edinburgh in 1796. His consuming interest in Christian philanthropy led him to preach widely in neglected villages and hamlets, promote the establishing of numerous Sunday schools and found societies like the Magdalene asylum to help prostitutes in Edinburgh and Glasgow. His opposition to the slave trade led to his involvement in the foundation of the Society for the Education of Africans. He collaborated with James Alexander Haldane in bringing some 30-40 African children to be educated in England. Following the Haldane Revival, Campbell became a Congregational Church minister. He was minister at Kingsland, an independent chapel he had founded, from 1802. He was instrumental in founding the British and Foreign Bible Society and became a director of the London Missionary Society.

The London Missionary Society sent him to the Cape in June 1812 to inspect the mission stations there. He set off from Cape Town in February 1813, calling in at Bethelsdorp and Grahamstown, then the military headquarters. Heading north he visited Graaff-Reinet and Klaarwater (later Griquatown), and then travelled further north to Litakun, the kraal of the Batlhaping kgosi (chief) Mothibi. His return trip went via Klaarwater, Pella and the Kamiesberge, arriving in Cape Town at the end of October. He wrote an account of this trip as "Travels in South Africa, undertaken at the request of the Missionary Society" and it was published on his return to London in 1815. The town of Campbell, east of Griquatown, was named in his honour.

Campbell returned to the Cape in February 1819 in the company of John Philip. His orders were to inspect and improve the mission stations which had fallen into a neglected state. On this visit he instructed the missionary Robert Moffat to start a mission among the Bechuana tribe. Campbell once more ventured into the interior, leaving Cape Town in January 1820 and travelling as far north as Mosega in Barotseland, on which journey he also came across the large settlement of Kaditshwene near the Limpopo River. He left for England in February 1821, publishing two further volumes covering his second journey. He subsequently delivered a series of lectures on his missionary work.

== Bibliography ==
- Campbell, John (1816). Travels in South Africa. Undertaken at the request of the Missionary Society. Andover. at the Internet Archive
- Philip, Robert (1841). The Life, Times and Missionary Enterprises of the Rev. John Campbell. London: John Snow. at the Internet Archive
