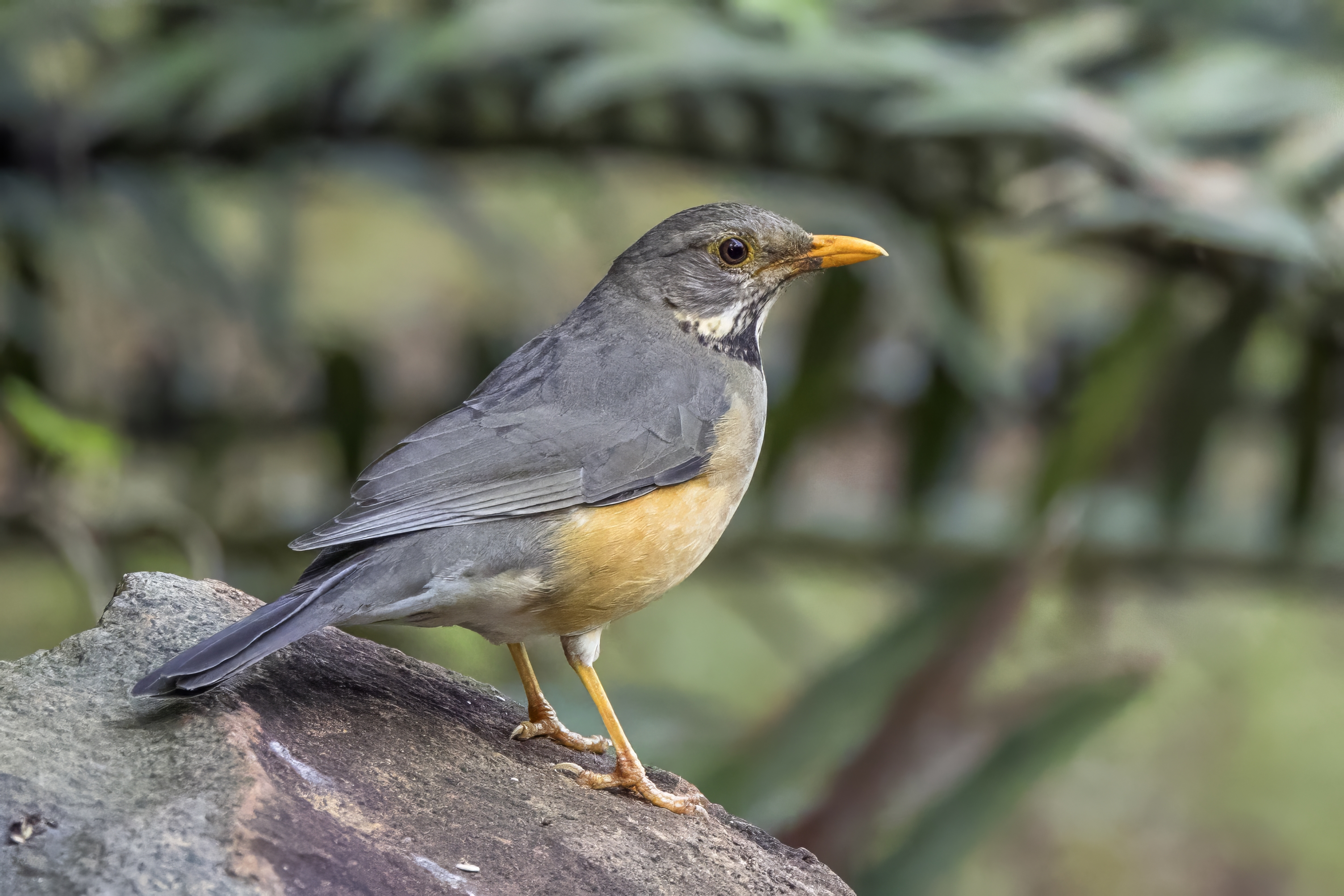
- Turdus libonyana libonyana, Eswatini

Conservation status
- Least Concern (IUCN 3.1)

Scientific classification
- Kingdom: Animalia
- Phylum: Chordata
- Class: Aves
- Order: Passeriformes
- Family: Turdidae
- Genus: Turdus
- Species: T. libonyana

Binomial name
- Turdus libonyana (Smith, 1836)

= Kurrichane thrush =

Species of bird

The Kurrichane thrush (Turdus libonyana) is a species of bird in the thrush family Turdidae. The species is found from central through to southern Africa. Its natural habitat is dry savanna and woodland, predominantly miombo woodland.

== Taxonomy and etymology ==
The Kurrichane thrush was described in 1836 by the zoologist Andrew Smith, on the basis of a specimen collected in the Transvaal in South Africa. It was originally assigned to the defunct genus Merula. The species is a sister species to the Comoro thrush.

The specific epithet of the Kurrichane thrush, libonyana, is derived from the Tswana name for the red-billed buffalo weaver, Lebonyana. It was given by mistake to this species, possibly because it also has a reddish bill. Its common name is derived from a corruption of Kaditshwene (rendered as 'Kurrichane'), a former town in northern South Africa where the original specimen was collected.

== Distribution and habitat ==
It is found in Angola, Botswana, Burundi, Democratic Republic of the Congo, Eswatini, Lesotho, Malawi, Mozambique, Namibia, South Africa, Tanzania, Zambia, and Zimbabwe.

== Description ==
The Kurrichane thrush is 21 to 23 cm (8.3–9.1 in) long and weighs around 46–82 g (1.6–2.9 oz). The head, upperparts and breast are grey, and the belly is whitish with orange flanks. The throat is white with black streaks on the side. The bill is orange, tending to a paler yellow at the base. The legs tend to vary in colour. Both sexes are alike.
