= Voortrekker Fort, Elandsfontein =

Voortrekker Fort
- "Elandsfontein Fort"
- Elandsfontein farm, Potchefstroom District, South Africa

Site information
- Type: Dry Wall construction
- Controlled by: South Africa
- Open to the public: Private property
- Condition: Ruined

Site history
- Built: 1842
- Materials: Local stone
- Events: Great Trek

Garrison information
- Past commanders: Commandant General A.M. Potgieter
- Garrison: Local Voortrekker families

The Voortrekker Fort situated on the farm, Elandsfontein, was constructed by the Voortrekkers under Commandant General A.M. Potgieter in 1842. A commemorative tablet of the former National Monuments Council states that the fort was built "for the protection of families with the view of possible departure of a commando against the British troops from Natal".

== History ==
According to tradition, this stone fort was built by the Voortrekkers under the leadership of Andries Hendrik Potgieter. It was presumably erected in 1842 to serve as a shelter for women and children in case the men had to leave for Port Natal to assist the Voortrekkers there against a British invasion.

The fort was built of stone and was about 24 m long and 12 m wide with embrasures at the corners to provide enfilading fire. The walls must have been about 1,5 m high. There are two roads that lead to Fochville from the national road between Johannesburg and Potchefstroom. The more southerly of these roads, the main route from Potchefstroom to Fochville, crosses the farm Elandsfontein where the ruins of this Voortrekker Fort.

== See also ==
- List of Castles and Fortifications in South Africa
- Great Trek
- Voortrekkers
- List of heritage sites in North West
