= George Thompson (traveller) =

British traveller in South Africa

George Thompson was the author of an 1827 single-volume (a two-volume edition followed shortly later in 1827) travelogue describing Travels and Adventures in Southern Africa in the years 1823–24. Travels and Adventures in Southern Africa was published in London by Henry Colburn.

Thompson had arrived at the Cape Colony in about 1818 and became a successful merchant in Cape Town. He travelled widely in southern Africa for purposes, principally, of expanding his company's business amongst the 1820 settlers of the Eastern Cape and elsewhere. He undertook an expedition to Kuruman and to the Augrabies Falls on the Orange River. His travelogue describes a journey to the 'country of the Bushmen, Korannas, and Namaquas', in the Roggeveld and Namaqualand and contains observations on the interaction and relationships between the colonists and the indigenous people of those regions.
