= Kaditshwene =

South African Iron Age settlement

Coordinates: 25°23′00″S 26°12′00″E

Kaditshweni
- Gaditshweme; Karechuenya
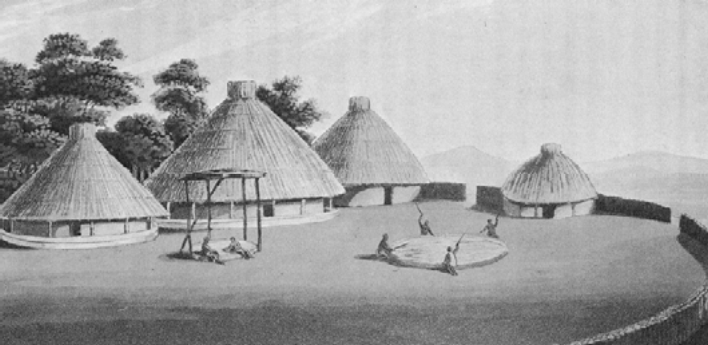
- Pre-colonial indigenous South African rondavel, homestead in Kadishwene
- Interactive map of Kaditshweni
- Cultures: Bahurutshe people
- Region: Zeerust, North West Province town

History
- Abandoned: 1820s

Kaditshwene aka Gaditshweni or Karechuenya, was a South African Iron Age settlement some 25 kilometres (16 mi) northeast of the town of Zeerust, North West province.

It was the cultural capital of the Bahurutshe people, one of the principal Tswana tribes and a centre of manufacturing and trading. The missionary John Campbell came across this settlement in the Tshwenyane hills of the Marico area in 1820, at which time its population of 20,000 exceeded that of Cape Town. Archaeologists estimate that it had been founded in the late 1400s on the site of iron and copper ore deposits.

In 1821, during the Mfecane, the town was sacked by the Batlokwa under the warrior queen Mantatisi. The attack was followed round 1823 by another under Sebetwane and the Bafokeng tribe. The survivors fled west and sought sanctuary among the Bakwena and other Tswana tribes. Crumbling stone walls, foundations, ash middens and remains of a metal working industry are the only evidence of the settlement's previous existence. In 2011 the ruins were declared a National Heritage Site by the Government.

The name is thought to be based on a Tswana expression, "Ga se ka ditshwene!", which means "What an incredible number of baboons". John Campbell referred to the town as "Kurreechane", a rendition which has survived in Kurrichane thrush and Kurrichane buttonquail, species that were described from there by Andrew Smith.
