= William John Burchell =

English explorer, naturalist, traveller, artist, and author

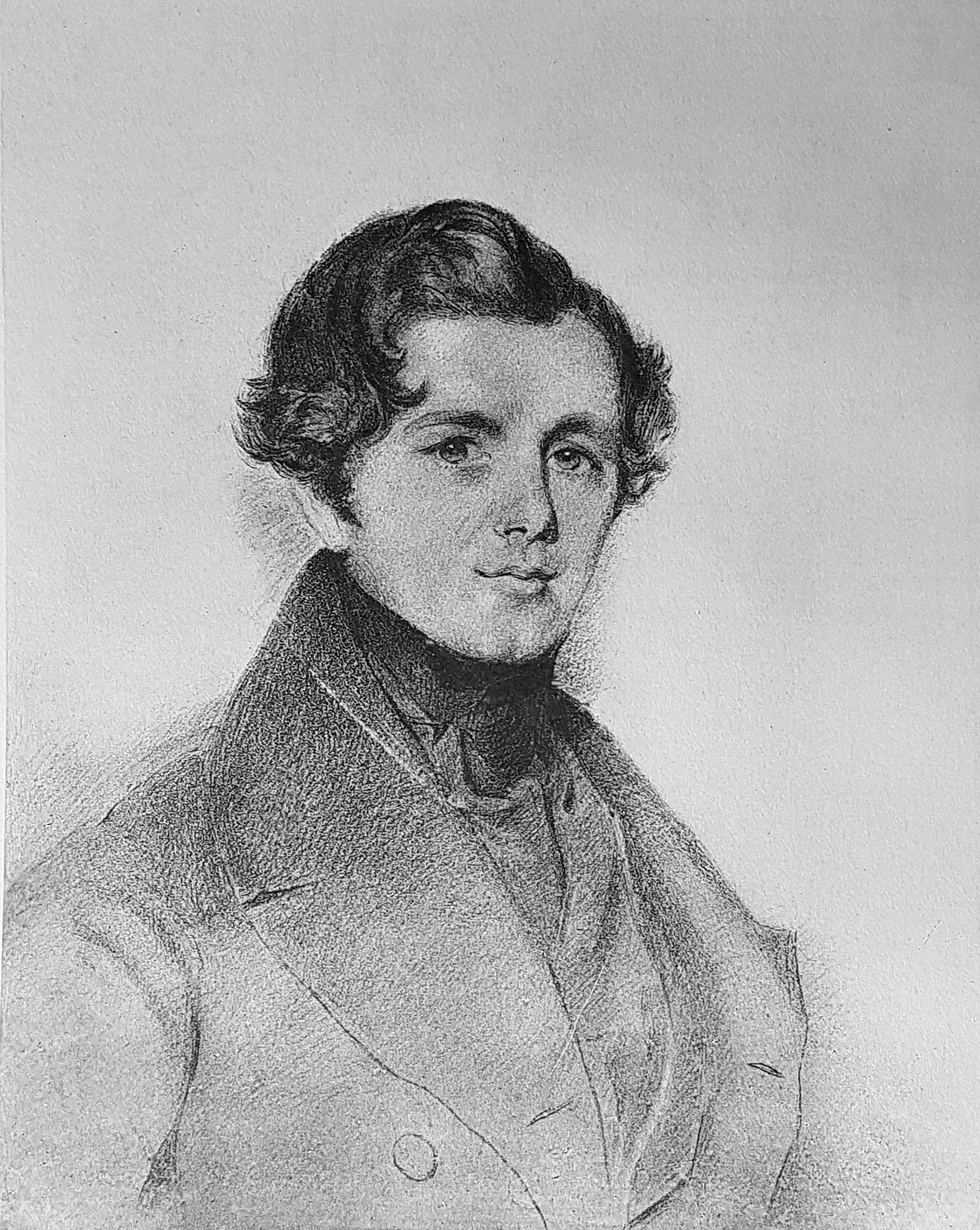
Portrait of Burchell by John Russell (1800).

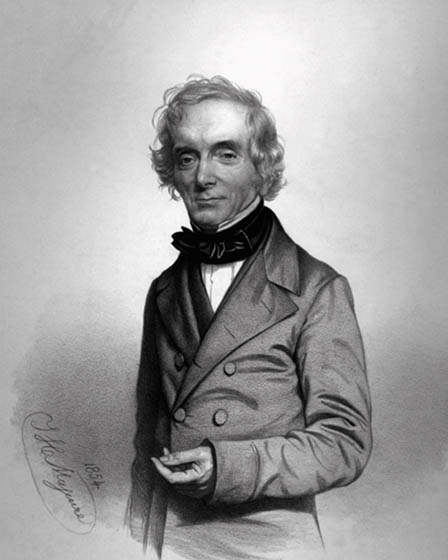
Portrait of Burchell by Thomas Herbert Maguire (1854).

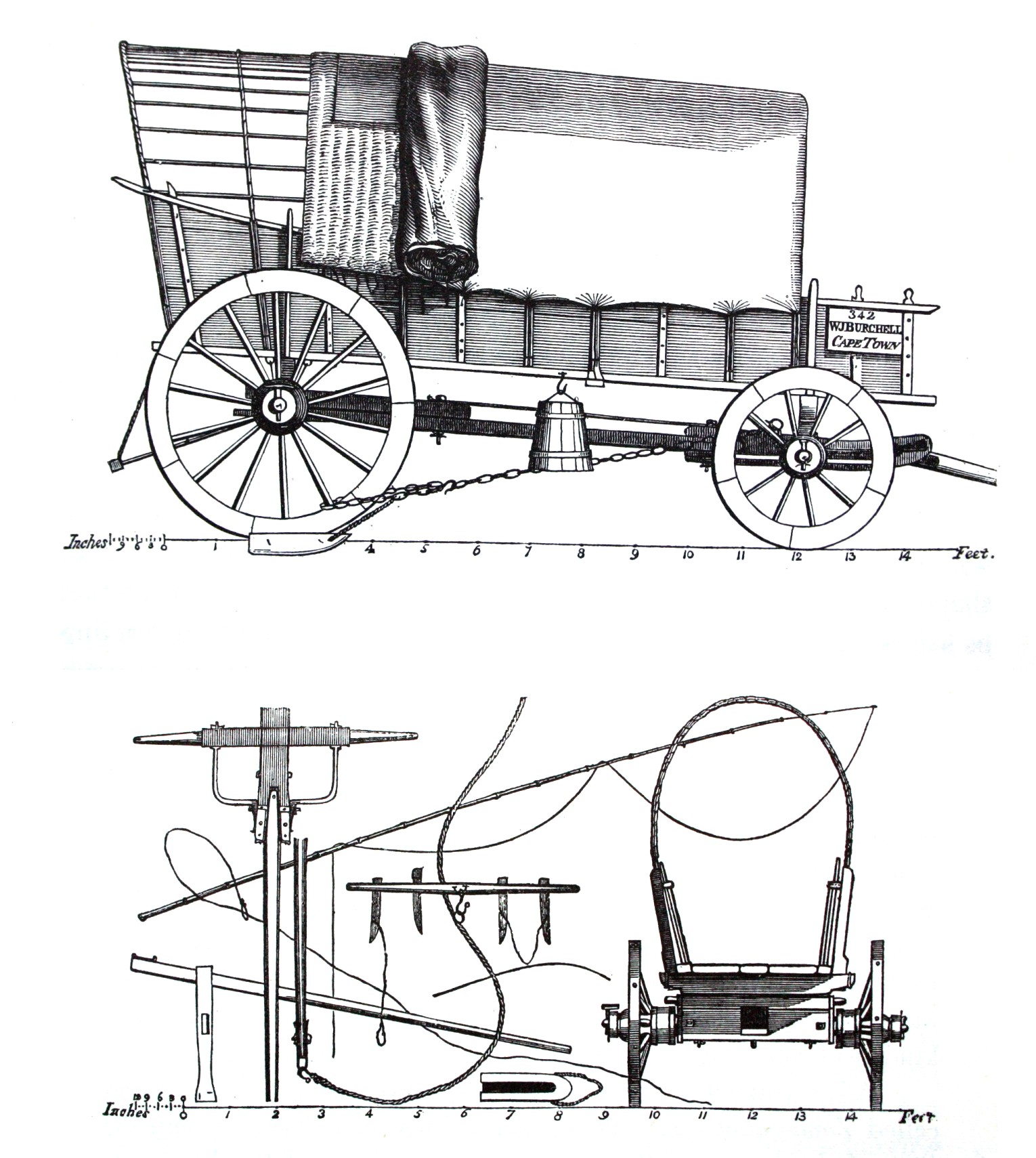
Wagon commissioned by Burchell for his expedition.

William John Burchell (23 July 1781 – 23 March 1863) was an English explorer, naturalist, traveller, artist, and author. His thousands of plant specimens, as well as field journals from his South African expedition, are held by Kew Gardens, and his insect collection by the Oxford University Museum.

== Early life and education ==
William John Burchell was born in Fulham, London, the son of Matthew Burchell, botanist and owner of Fulham Nursery, and his wife. His father owned nine and a half acres of land adjacent to the gardens of Fulham Palace. Burchell served a botanical apprenticeship at Kew and was elected F.L.S. (Fellow of the Linnaen Society) in 1803. At about this time, he became enamoured of Lucia Green of Fulham, but faced strong disapproval from his parents when he broached the idea of an engagement.

== Career ==
On 7 August 1805, Burchell at the age of 24 sailed for St. Helena aboard the East Indiaman Northumberland intending to set up there as a merchant with a partner from London, William Balcombe (1779–1829). After a year of trading, Burchell did not want to continue and dissolved the partnership. Three months later, he accepted a position as schoolmaster on the island and later as official botanist.

In 1810, he sailed to the Cape of Good Hope in South Africa on the recommendation of Gen. J.W. Janssens to explore and to add to his botanical collection. Burchell's intended wife had jilted him for the captain of the boat taking her to St. Helena to join him.

Landing at Table Bay on 26 November 1810, after stormy weather had prevented a landing for 13 days, Burchell set about planning an expedition into the interior. He left Cape Town in June 1811.

Burchell travelled in South Africa through 1815, collecting over 50,000 specimens, and covering more than 7000 km, much over unexplored terrain. He described his journey in Travels in the Interior of Southern Africa, a two-volume work appearing in 1822 and 1824. (It was reprinted in 1967 by C. Struik of Cape Town.) He is believed to have planned a third volume, since the second ends long before he completed his journey. A book reconstructing the remainder of the journey was published in 2022 (Burchell's African Odyssey). On 25 August 1815 he sailed from Cape Town with 48 crates of specimens aboard the vessel Kate, calling at St. Helena and reaching Fulham on 11 November 1815. Given his experience and knowledge of South Africa, in 1819 Burchell was closely questioned by a select committee of the British House of Commons about the suitability of the area for emigration. The 1820 Settlers went out from England a year later.

He spent time cataloguing and processing his specimens, and raising funds for his next expedition. Burchell travelled in Brazil between 1825 and 1830, again collecting a large number of specimens, including more than 20,000 insects. The journals covering his Brazil expedition are missing, as are his diaries relating to his later travels. His field note books, detailing his plant collections, are held in the collection of Kew Gardens. Historians have used them to reconstruct the latter part of his trip.

Burchell's extensive African collections included plants, animal skins, skeletons, insects, seeds, bulbs and fish. After his death, his plant specimens, drawings and manuscripts, both South African and Brazilian, were presented by his sister, Anna Burchell, to Kew Gardens and the insects to Oxford University Museum. He is known for the copious and accurate notes he made to accompany every collected specimen, detailing habit and habitat, as well as the numerous drawings and paintings of landscapes, portraits, costumes, people, animals and plants.

Burchell died in Fulham in 1863, ending his own life by hanging himself in a small outhouse in his garden, after a non-fatal suicide attempt by shooting. He is buried near his home at All Saints Church, Fulham.

== Published works ==
- Travels in the Interior of Southern Africa. Vol. 1. Longman, Hurst, Rees, Orme, and Brown. 1822.
- Travels in the Interior of Southern Africa. Vol. 2. Longman, Hurst, Rees, Orme, and Brown. 1824.

== Legacy and honours ==
He is commemorated in the monotypic plant genus Burchellia R. Br.

Numerous animal species were named after him, including Burchell's zebra, Burchell's coucal, Burchell's sandgrouse, Burchell's courser, Burchell's starling, the army ant Eciton burchellii, and a species of African lizard, Pedioplanis burchelli.

== See also ==
- Burchell's Shelter
- Category:Taxa named by William John Burchell

== Gallery ==
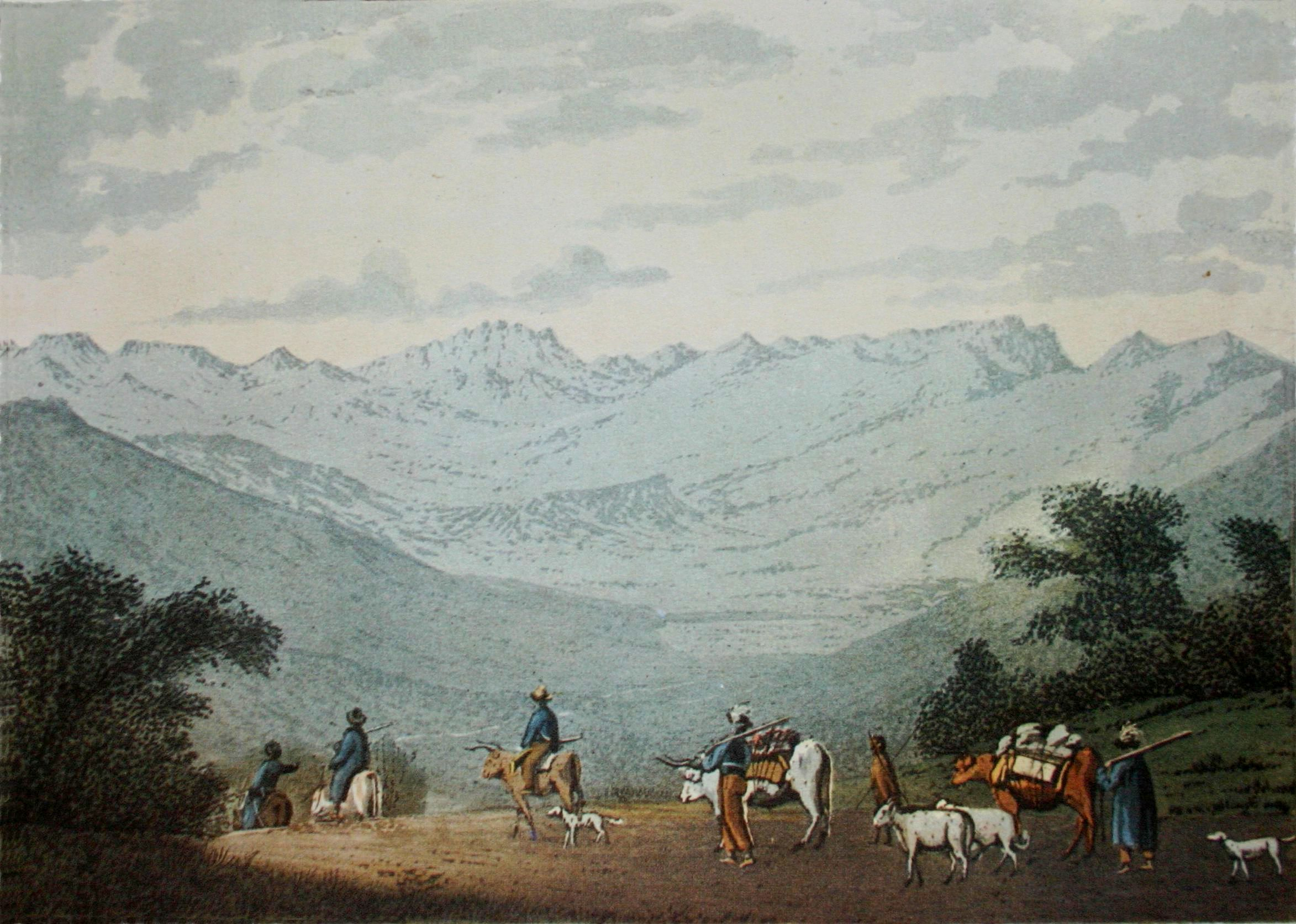
Descending from the Sneeuberge near Graaff-Reinet

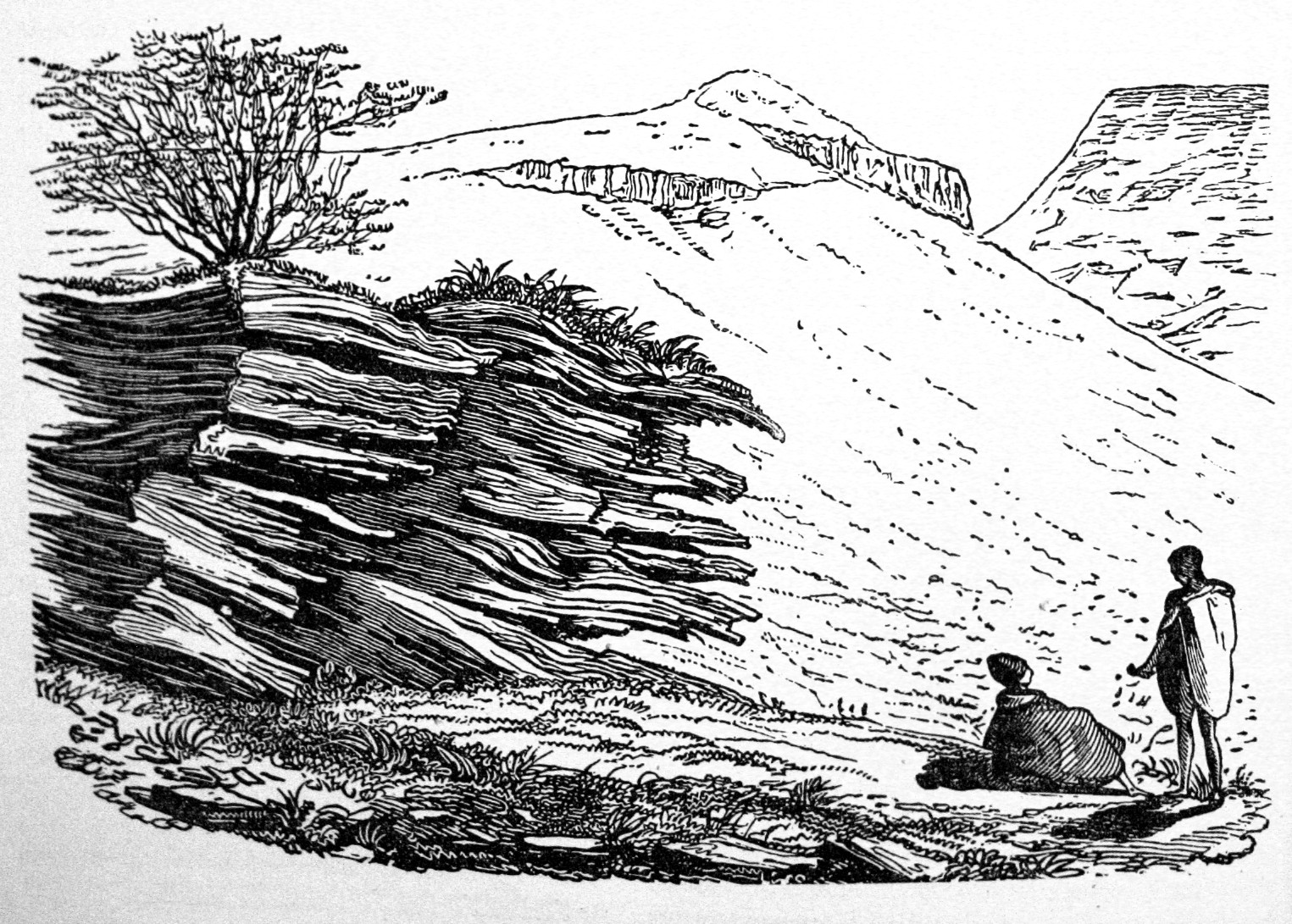
Rocks in the Asbestos Mountains

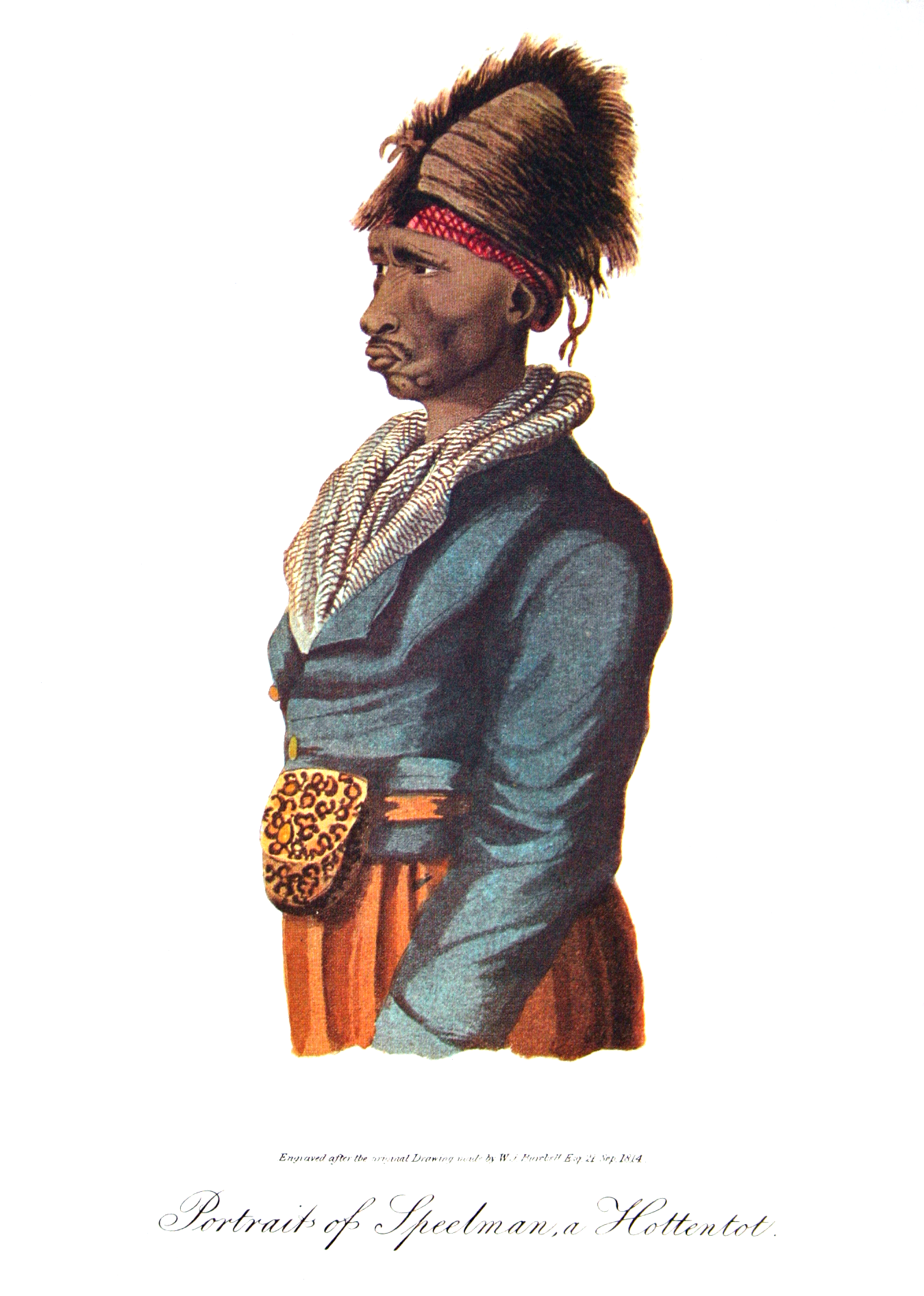
Portrait of Stoffel Speelman, a Khoekhoe collecting assistant
