= Rondavel =

Traditional dwelling type

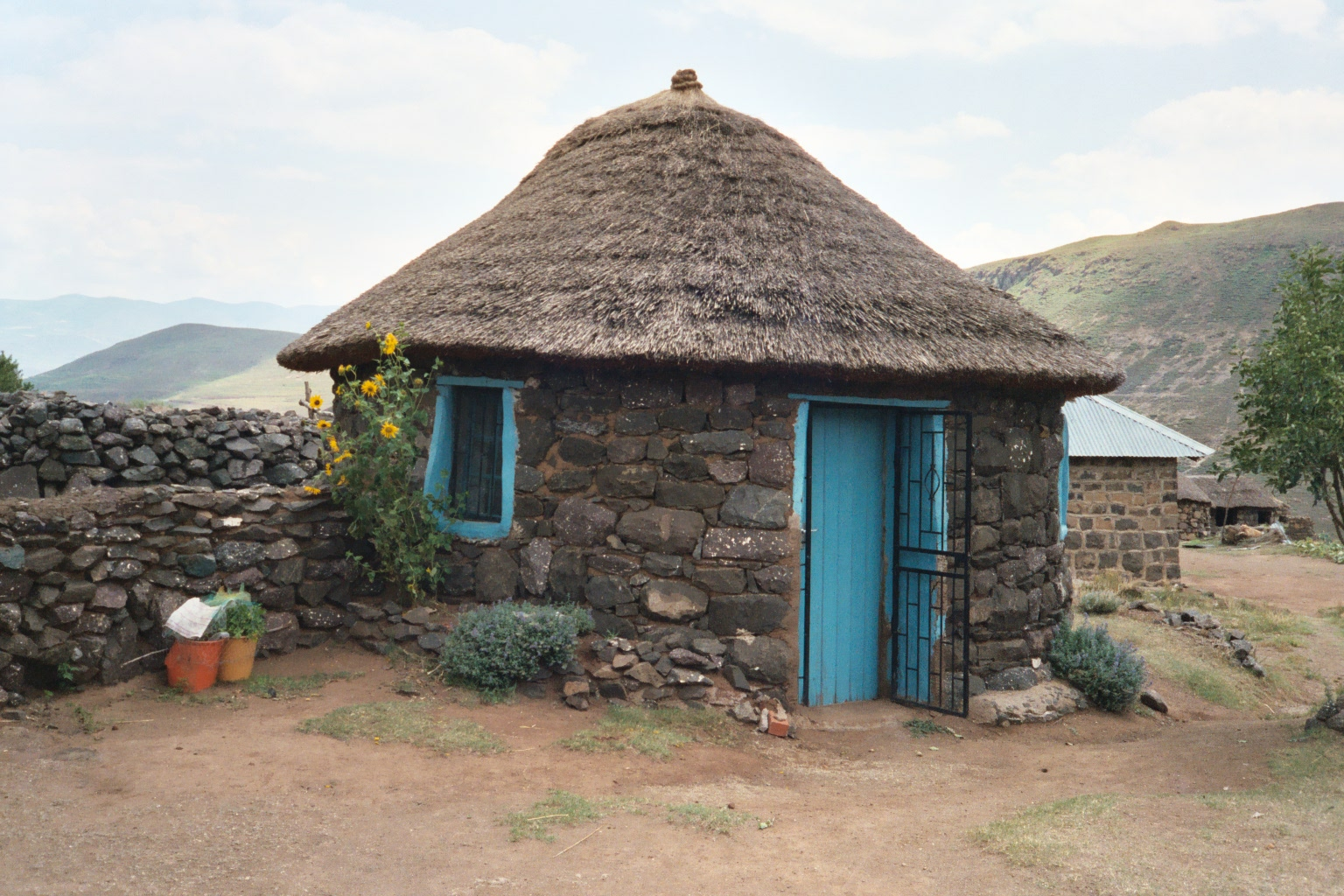
An undecorated rondavel in Lesotho

Rondavel is a style of African hut known in literature as cone on cylinder or cone on drum. The word comes from the Afrikaans rondawel.

== Description ==
The rondavel is usually round or oval in shape and is traditionally made with materials that can be locally found in raw form. Its walls are often constructed from stones. The mortar may consist of sand, soil, or combinations of these, mixed with cow dung. The floor of a traditional rondavel is finished with a dung mixture to make it hard and smooth. The main roofing elements of a rondavel are spars or poles taken from tree limbs, which have been harvested and cut to length. The roof covering is of thatch that is sewn to the poles with grass rope. The process of completing the thatch can take as little as one weekend or up to a year if made by a skilled artisan, as it must be sewn in one section at a time, starting from the bottom working towards the top. As each section is sewn, it may be weathered and aged to form a complete weatherproof seal.

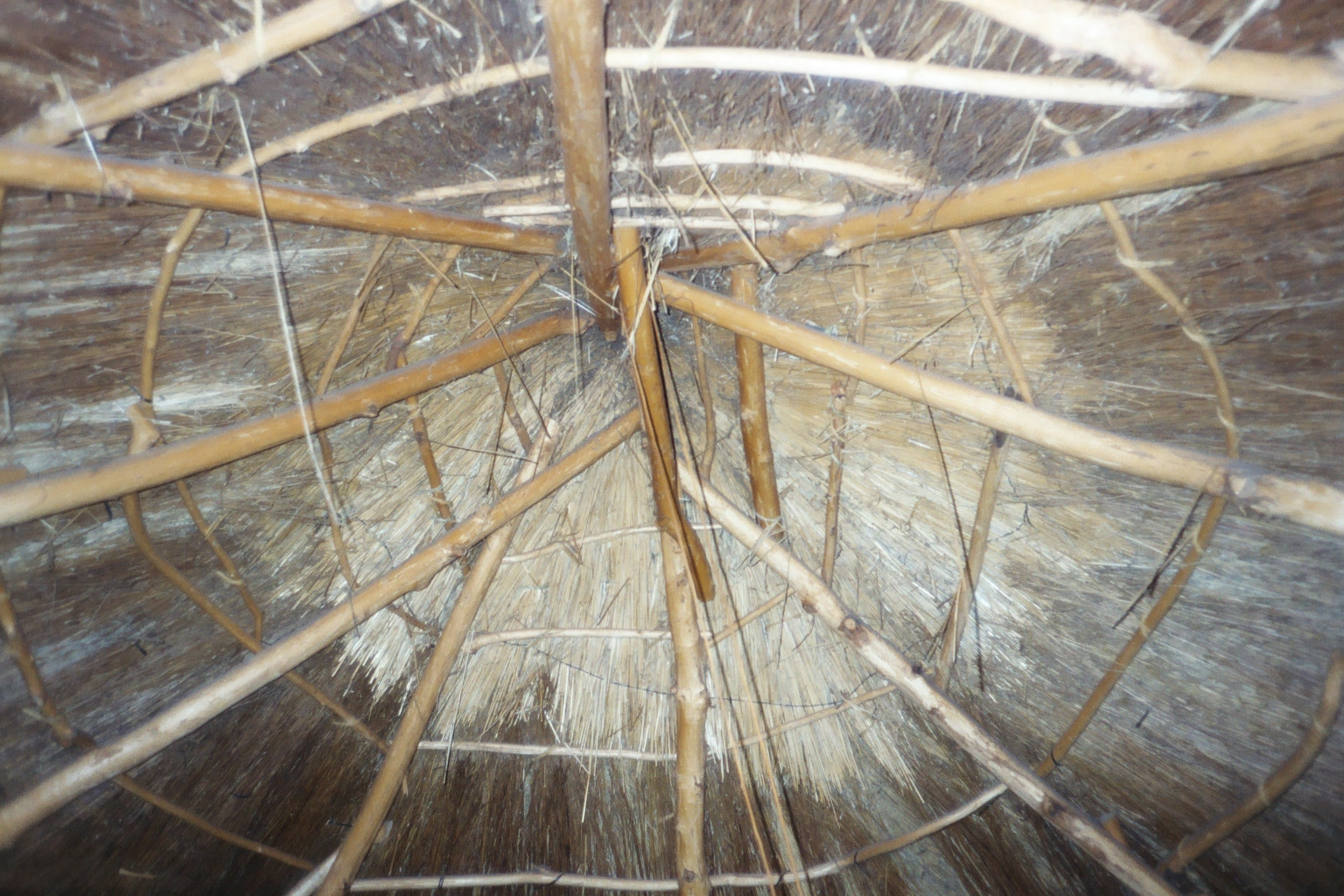
The roof of a rondavel from the inside.

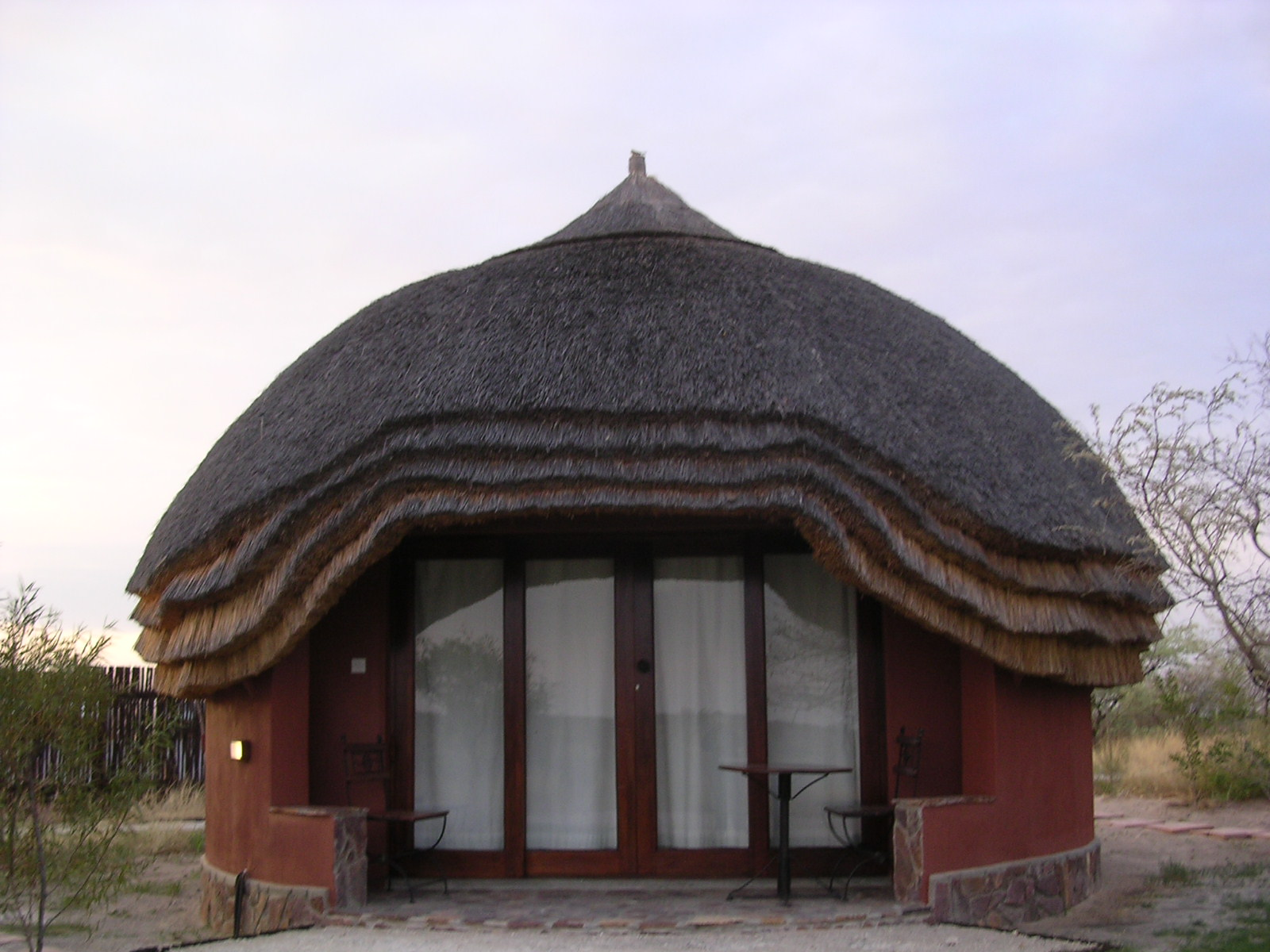
A rondavel at Khutse Kalahari Lodge in the Kalahari Desert, Botswana.

== Regional variations ==
Rondavels can be found in the countries of Southern Africa, including: South Africa, Lesotho (where the hut is also known as a mokhoro), Eswatini, Botswana, and others. In Réunion they exist only in public places, for picnics for example. In different areas, there are small local variations in wall height, roof pitch and general finish. Some people elaborately carve, paint, or decorate the outside wall that has been finished off with dung. In other places, people leave their rondavels undecorated.

== Developments in construction techniques ==
In recent times, with the availability of modern construction materials, the appearance and construction of rondavels have changed. They may have concrete foundations, be built with cement blocks or brick, mortared with cement, and/or roofed with corrugated tin. While the traditional rondavel did not have running water, electricity, and/or other modern amenities, many are now equipped with or have been adapted to accommodate these services.

Today, complete homes built in the rondavel architecture are common, and rondavels are fairly popular as outbuildings on smallholdings and commercial farms (e.g. tool sheds, milk rooms, staff accommodation, etc.). Rondavels are also quite common as holiday cottages. Apart from pre-fabricated rondavels, the roofing material is nearly always thatch, because it is difficult to make a neat conical roof out of other materials.

Structurally, no internal struts are required. The principals (wooden poles running radially out from the apex of the roof to the top of the rondavel's wall) are fully supported by the circular purlins: First, the principals do not sag in the middle, because sagging only puts the purlins near the middle of the principals under compression. Second, the principals do not splay at the bottom (push the top of the walls over to the outside) because splaying only puts the purlins near the bottom of the principals under tension. Thus it is possible to build a large rondavel without internal bracing for the roof. Traditional African rondavels range in size depending on the availability of building and construction materials.

== Gallery ==
Examples of rondavels

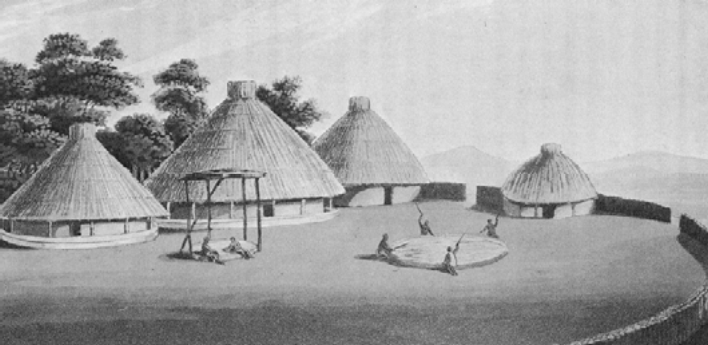
Homestead in the City of Kaditshwene (c.1400s–c.1820s)

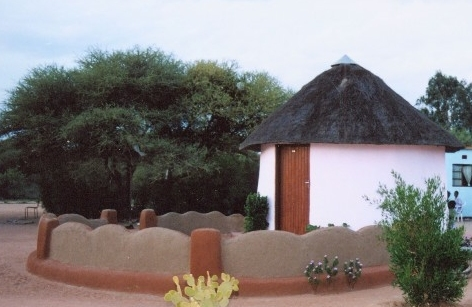
A rondavel with a smooth painted finish

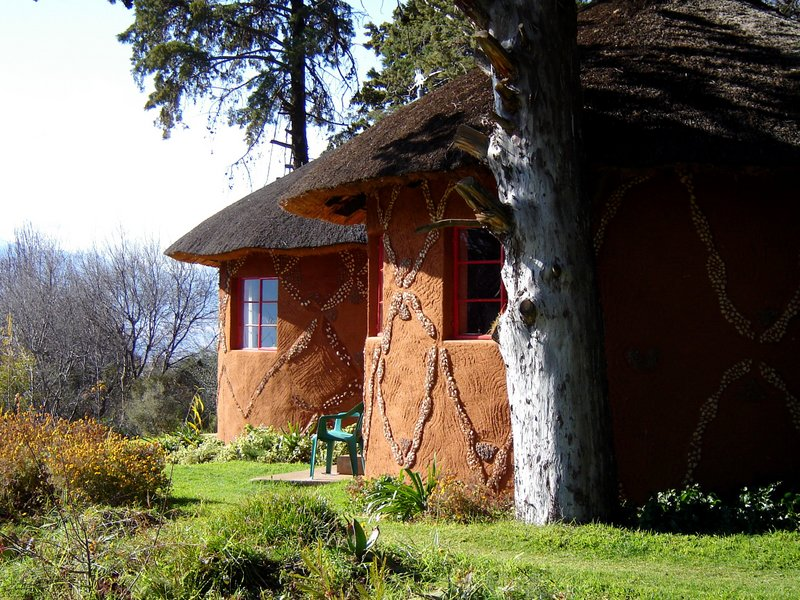
Two rondavels in Mafeteng, Lesotho

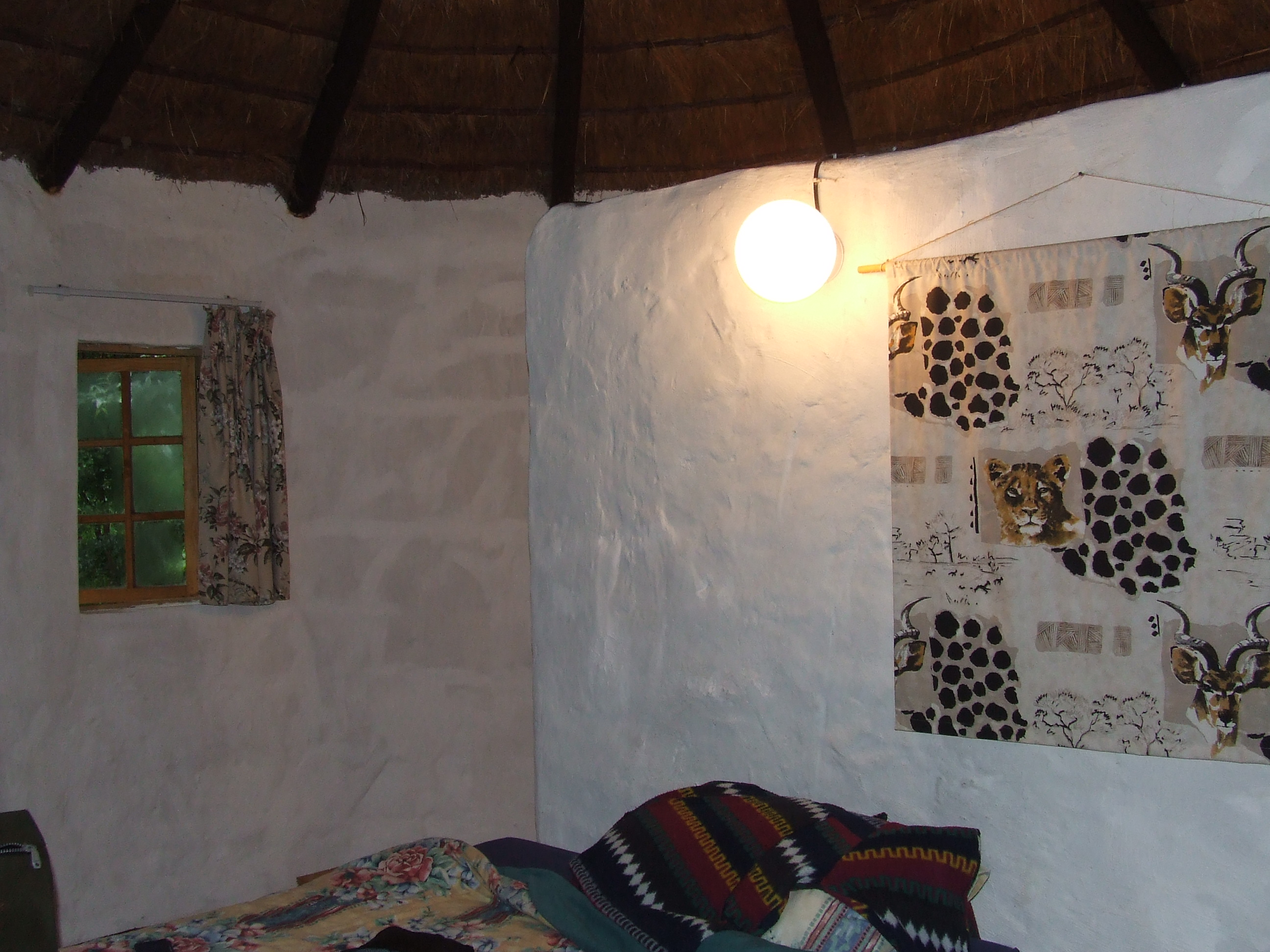
Inside of a rondavel for backpackers

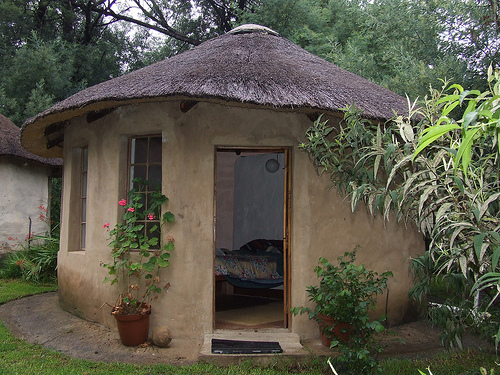
Outside of a rondavel for backpackers

== See also ==
- Vernacular architecture
