= Customs Office Building, Zemun =

Building in Belgrade, Serbia

The Customs Office Building
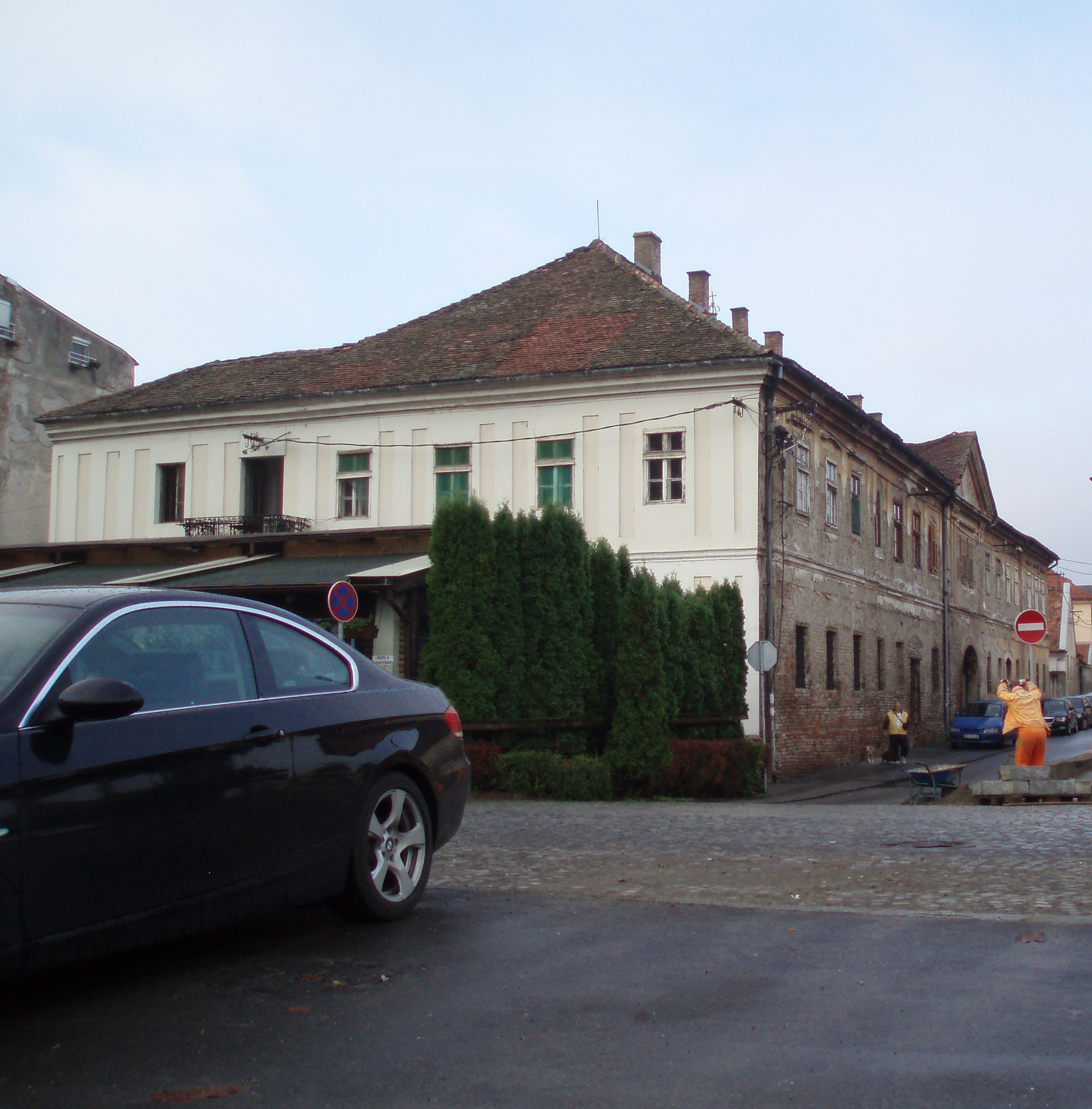
- The Customs Office building in Zemun, 26, Zmaj Jovina Street
- Interactive map of the The Customs Office Building area

General information
- Status: Cultural monument
- Location: Belgrade, Serbia
- Coordinates: 44°54′59″N 20°41′44″E
- Completed: 1781

Technical details
- Floor count: 2

The Customs Office Building in Zemun is located at 26, Zmaj Jovina Street in the Zemun neighborhood of Belgrade, Serbia, and it has the status of a cultural monument.

== History and appearance of the building ==
In 1781, the Customs Office was erected on the site of an older building in which customs procedures were carried out. The building has one Storey, and its purpose was twofold – a warehouse on the ground floor, and offices and apartments of customs officials upstairs. The building was built with lime mortar and full walls bridged with arches on the ground floor and architraves on the floor. It was a stand-alone building with an elongated base, with two wings thrown into the yard and the main facade towards Zmaj Jovina Street. The building was designed in the spirit of classicism with a pronounced triangular pediment above the main entrance. The structural system shows the characteristics of the Baroque. The interior layout is simple and logical – rooms line up along a longitudinal corridor. The Customs Office was one of the most important buildings of the old core of Zemun, next to which were the boilery warehouses. It is one of the most important buildings in the economic development of Zemun.

Today, the Customs Office building is used as a residence and catering shop, but it is in very poor condition with a crumbling facade and collapsed roof.

== Gallery ==
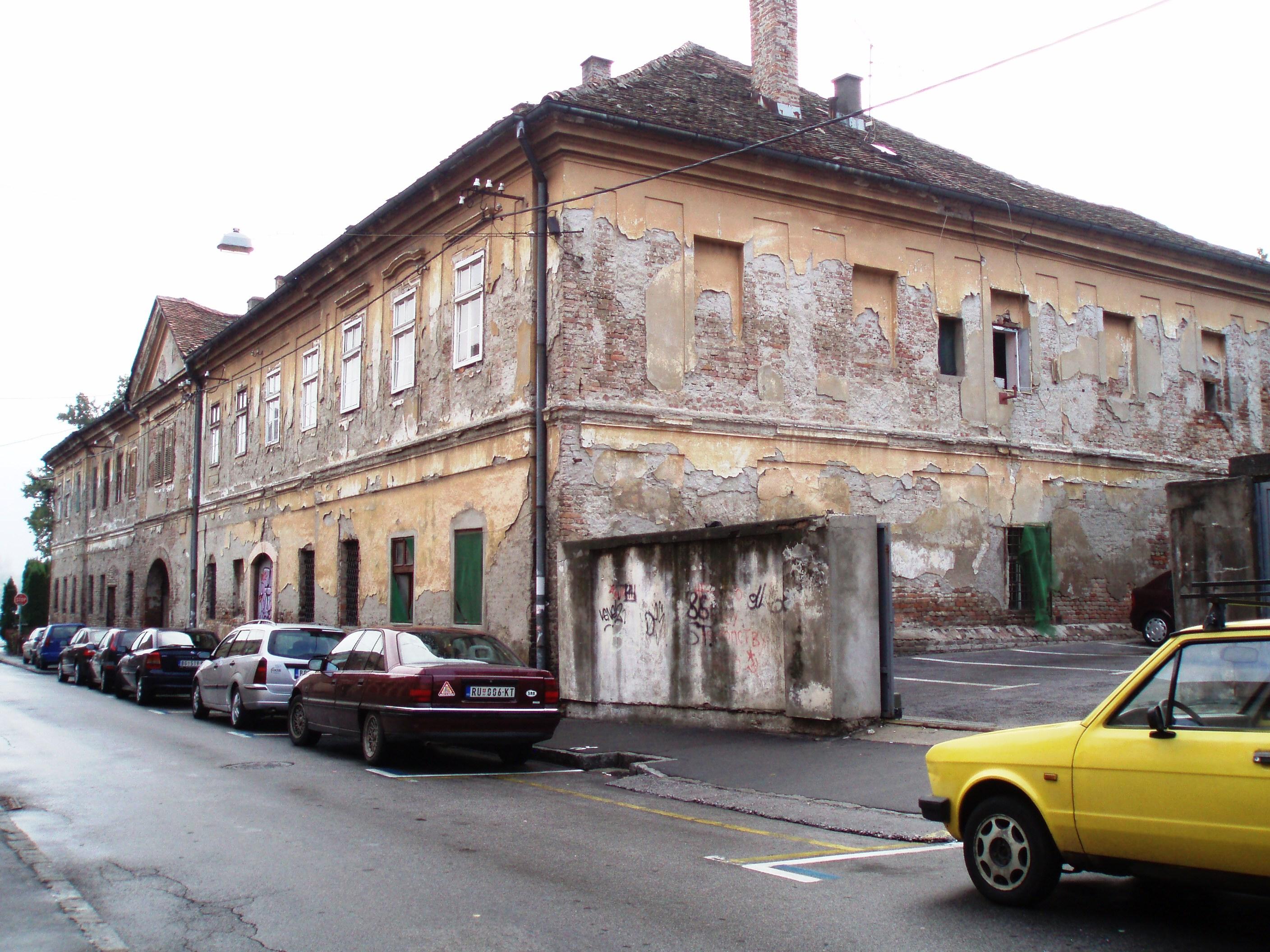
Appearance from Zmaj Jovina Street

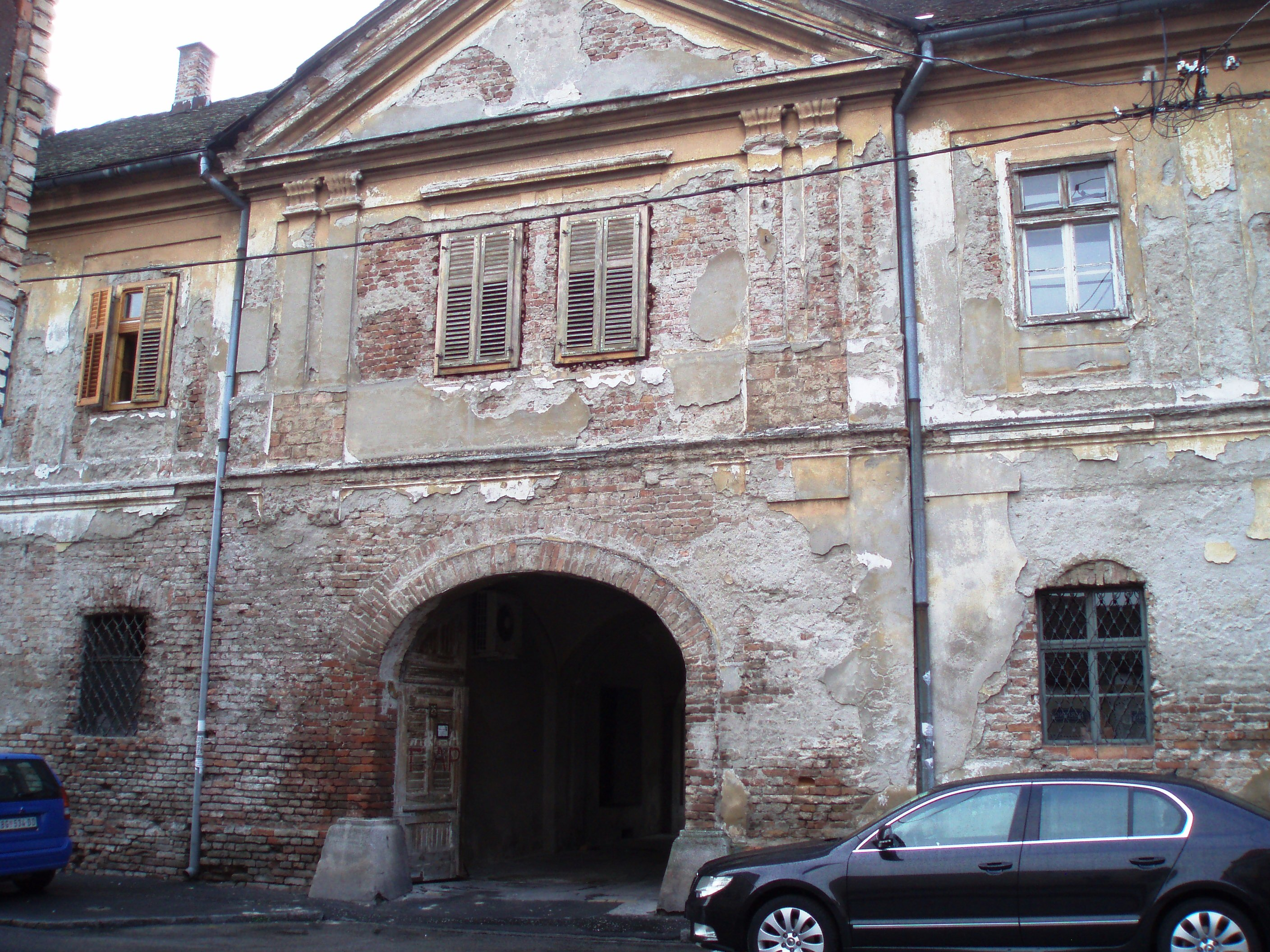
Main entrance

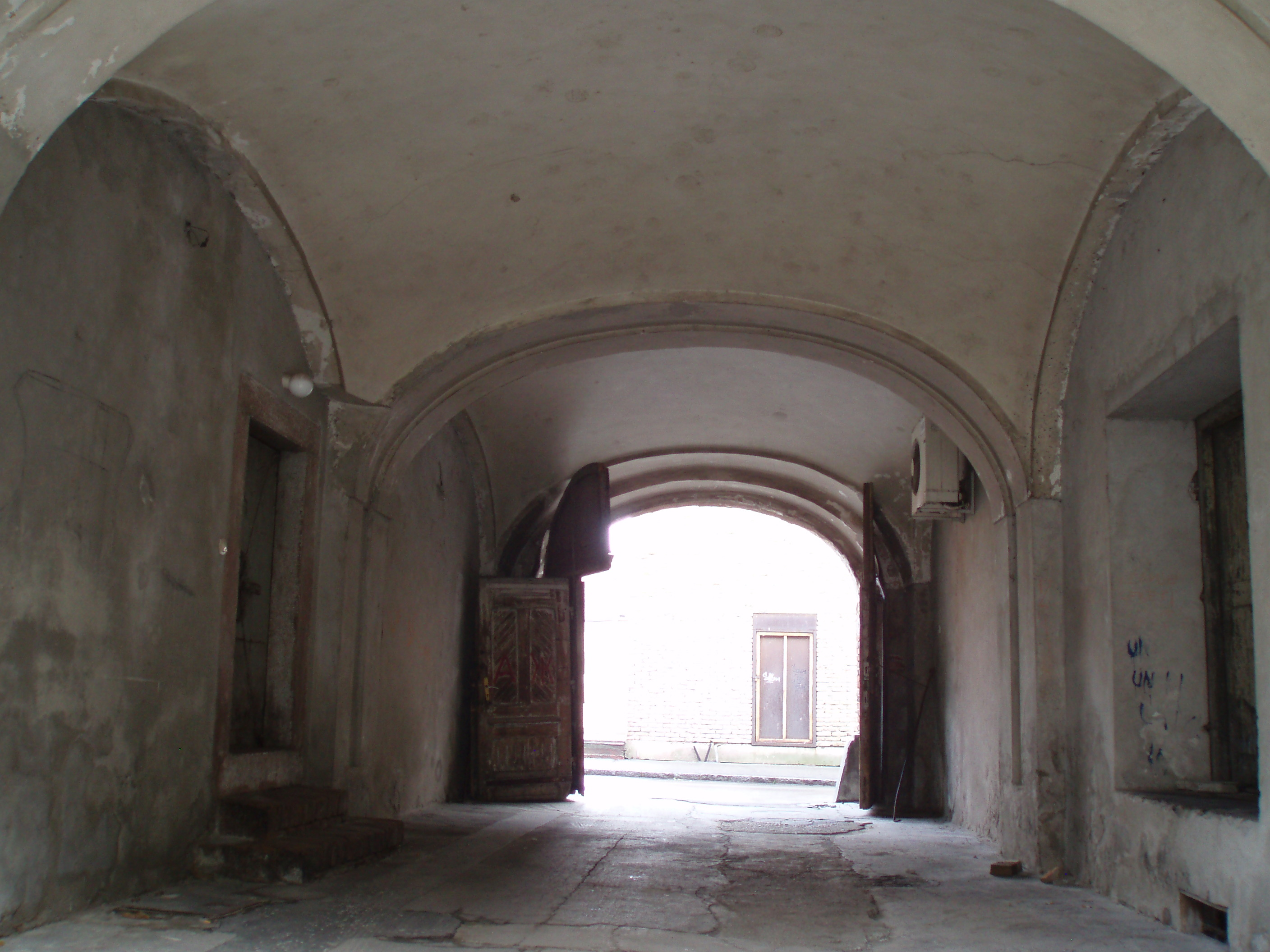
Entrance hall
