= List of heritage sites in Graaff-Reinet =

This is a list of the heritage sites in Graaff-Reinet (Sarah Baartman District Municipality) as recognised by the South African Heritage Resources Agency.

SAHRA identifier	Site name	Description	Town	District	NHRA status	Coordinates	Image
9/2/033/0001-004	Nooitgedacht	This farm was originally granted in 1818 to Pieter Johannes Naude and Hendrik Petrus Janse van Rensburg as quitrent land. The manor house, which dates from 1818, forms a unique Cape Dutch architectural group which is of considerable historical value.	Graaff-Reinet	Graaff-Reinet	Provincial Heritage Site	32°18′48″S 24°58′15″E	Upload Photo
9/2/033/0001-006	Hyena trap, Bluegum House	This corbelled hyena trap was built to catch predators. It forms an important material link with the pioneering way of life in South Africa.	Graaff-Reinet	Graaff-Reinet	Provincial Heritage Site	32°15′08″S 24°32′26″E	Upload Photo
9/2/033/0002-297	83 Somerset Street	Set back, long 5 bay Karoo-type house with stepped parapet, wing extension to the right and pergolas. Karoo-type roof with high stepped parapet and heavy cornice. Extension also has Karoo-type roof and parapet. Wall has rustication. Stoep with pergola Architectural style: Karoo-type. Type of site: House. Current use: Residential. These buildings, with their Georgian Karoo style and Victorian features, which date mainly from the nineteenth century, form an integral part of the historical and architectural core of Graaff-Reinet, which was founded in 1785.	Graaff-Reinet	Graaff-Reinet	Provincial Heritage Site	32°15′12″S 24°31′45″E	Upload Photo
9/2/033/0002-298	7 Bourke Street	2-Unit long Victorian house with 2 front gables and a veranda. Saddle roof with 2 triangular, covered front gables with fretwork bargeboarding and arched vents. Verandah with hipped, concave roof with fretwork fringes, wooden posts and trellis railing Architectural style: Victorian. Type of site: House Current use: Residential. These buildings, with their Georgian Karoo style and Victorian features, which date mainly from the nineteenth century, form an integral part of the historical and architectural core of Graaff-Reinet, which was founded in 1785.	Graaff-Reinet	Graaff-Reinet	Provincial Heritage Site	32°14′55″S 24°31′58″E	Upload Photo
9/2/033/0002-299	10 North Street	3 bay low-pitched gabled cast iron roof with covered end gable to street front with fretwork bargeboarding, finials, arched louvred vent. Moulded cornice. Wall rusticated below cornice with smooth raised plaster surround incorporating hood mould only ar Type of site: House Current use: Residential. These buildings, with their Georgian Karoo style and Victorian features, which date mainly from the nineteenth century, form an integral part of the historical and architectural core of Graaff-Reinet, which was founded in 1785.	Graaff-Reinet	Graaff-Reinet	Provincial Heritage Site	32°14′51″S 24°32′10″E	Upload Photo
9/2/033/0002-300	7 North Street	3 bay Karoo-type cottage with pedimented parapet. Wall has rustication, eyebrow mouldings and moulded door architrave. Verandah with hipped ogee roof on precast spiral (sugar stick) pillars and dwarf walls. 4 × 4 panel double door with 2 pane fanlight. Architectural style: Karoo-type. Type of site: House Current use: Residential. These buildings, with their Georgian Karoo style and Victorian features, which date mainly from the nineteenth century, form an integral part of the historical and architectural core of Graaff-Reinet, which was founded in 1785.	Graaff-Reinet	Graaff-Reinet	Provincial Heritage Site	32°14′51″S 24°32′12″E	Upload Photo
9/2/033/0002-301	102 Somerset Street, Graaff-Reinet	3 bay Karoo-type cottage with stepped parapet and stoep. Karoo-type roofwith stepped parapet and heavy cornice. Wall has fine rustication and corner mouldings. Stoep with end walls and seats. 2 panel (upper one arched) Edwardian type door with plain f Architectural style: Karoo-type. Type of site: House Current use: Residential. These buildings, with their Georgian Karoo style and Victorian features, which date mainly from the nineteenth century, form an integral part of the historical and architectural core of Graaff-Reinet, which was founded in 1785.	Graaff-Reinet	Graaff-Reinet	Provincial Heritage Site	32°15′10″S 24°31′45″E	Upload Photo
9/2/033/0002-302	94 Somerset Street, Graaff-Reinet	Karoo-type corner house with straight parapet and verandah in Somerset street. Karoo-type roof with straight high parapet with moulded edge. Verandah with high, hipped ogee roof with fretwork fringe on twin metal pipes and straight walls. 4 panel (top Architectural style: Karoo-type. Type of site: House Current use: Residential. These buildings, with their Georgian Karoo style and Victorian features, which date mainly from the nineteenth century, form an integral part of the historical and architectural core of Graaff-Reinet, which was founded in 1785.	Graaff-Reinet	Graaff-Reinet	Provincial Heritage Site	32°15′09″S 24°31′48″E	Upload Photo
9/2/033/0002-303	90 and 90A Somerset Street, Graaff-Reinet	Hall-shaped house with low-pitch roof and gable facing street with simple verandah. Low-pitch roof with finial and arched and louvred vent. Simple verandah with hipped straight roof on metal pipes and low straight dwarf wall with wrought iron fence and 2 Architectural style: Victorian. Type of site: House Current use: Residential (earlier school and later church). These buildings, with their Georgian Karoo style and Victorian features, which date mainly from the nineteenth century, form an integral part of the historical and architectural core of Graaff-Reinet, which was founded in 1785.	Graaff-Reinet	Graaff-Reinet	Provincial Heritage Site	32°15′09″S 24°31′49″E	Upload Photo
9/2/033/0002-304	42 Somerset Street, Graaff-Reinet	3 bay double storey Karoo-type house with double storey decorative verandah. Karoo-type roof with stepped parapet. Wall has rustication and moulded architraves. Verandah with straight roof on precast pillars and balustrades (2 fl. and pointed moulded a Architectural style: Karoo-type. Type of site: House Current use: Residential. These buildings, with their Georgian Karoo style and Victorian characteristics and which date mainly from the nineteenth century, form an integral part of the historical and architectural core of Graarf-Reinet, which was founded in 1785.	Graaff-Reinet	Graaff-Reinet	Provincial Heritage Site	32°15′03″S 24°32′04″E	Upload Photo
9/2/033/0002-305	84 Somerset Street, Graaff-Reinet	3 bay Karoo-type cottage with twin moulded pediments parapet and verandah. Abuts or attached to no. 86. Karoo-type roof with moulded twin pediments on parapet. Wall has rustication. Verandah with bullnose roof on precast pillars and straight facebrick Type of site: House Current use: Residential. These buildings, with their Georgian Karoo style and Victorian features, which date mainly from the nineteenth century, form an integral part of the historical and architectural core of Graaff-Reinet, which was founded in 1785.	Graaff-Reinet	Graaff-Reinet	Provincial Heritage Site	32°15′08″S 24°31′51″E	Upload Photo
9/2/033/0002-306	19 North Street, Graaff-Reinet	3 Bay saddle roof house with verandah. Saddle roof with cast iron ridge crest. Gable has arched vent. Wall rusticated. Verandah with hipped, ogee roof with fretwork fringe, iron pipes on dipped walls with tiled tops. 3 × 3 panel double door with plai Architectural style: Victorian. Type of site: House Current use: Residential. These buildings, with their Georgian Karoo style and Victorian features, which date mainly from the nineteenth century, form an integral part of the historical and architectural core of Graaff-Reinet, which was founded in 1785.	Graaff-Reinet	Graaff-Reinet	Provincial Heritage Site	32°14′52″S 24°32′08″E	Upload Photo
9/2/033/0002-307	26 Somerset Street, Graaff-Reinet	3 bay Victorian house with hipped roof and ornamental verandah. Low-pitched hipped roof. Wall has eyebrow mouldings and heavy moulded architraves. Verandah with hipped ogee roof with fretwork frieze, supports and railing. 3 × 3 panel double door with Architectural style: Victorian. Type of site: House Current use: Residential. These buildings, with their Georgian Karoo style and Victorian features, which date mainly from the nineteenth century, form an integral part of the historical and architectural core of Graaff-Reinet, which was founded in 1785.	Graaff-Reinet	Graaff-Reinet	Provincial Heritage Site	32°15′01″S 24°32′10″E	Upload Photo
9/2/033/0002-308	79 Somerset Street, Graaff-Reinet	H-shaped corner house with 2 gables in Somerset Street and verandah in both streets. 2 low-pitch saddle roofs with covered gables, fretwork bargeboarding and cross-shaped vents. Walls have rustication. Verandah in both streets with straight roofs on pr Architectural style: Victorian. Type of site: House Current use: Residential. These buildings, with their Georgian Karoo style and Victorian characteristics and which date mainly from the nineteenth century, form an integral part of the historical and architectural core of Graarf-Reinet, which was founded in 1785.	Graaff-Reinet	Graaff-Reinet	Provincial Heritage Site	32°15′11″S 24°31′47″E	Upload Photo
9/2/033/0002-309	72 Somerset Street, Graaff-Reinet	3 bay double-storey building with pointed roof and double storey verandah. Low-pitch pointed roof. Earlier decorated 2 storey verandah, now double-storey verandah with straight roof on precast pillars and straight, tiled walls in both 3 × 3 panel double Architectural style: Victorian. Type of site: House Current use: Residential. These buildings, with their Georgian Karoo style and Victorian characteristics and which date mainly from the nineteenth century, form an integral part of the historical and architectural core of Graarf-Reinet, which was founded in 1785.	Graaff-Reinet	Graaff-Reinet	Provincial Heritage Site	32°15′06″S 24°31′55″E	Upload Photo
9/2/033/0002-310	67 Somerset Street, Graaff-Reinet	Set back Victorian house with decorative wing and verandah. Tiled saddle roofs with fine cast iron ridge crests and gable with fretwork bargeboarding, finials and moulded ninche. Walls have rustication, moulded architraces and heavy corner quoins. Vera Architectural style: Victorian. Type of site: House Current use: Residential. These buildings, with their Georgian Karoo style and Victorian characteristics and which date mainly from the nineteenth century, form an integral part of the historical and architectural core of Graarf-Reinet, which was founded in 1785.	Graaff-Reinet	Graaff-Reinet	Provincial Heritage Site	32°15′08″S 24°31′59″E	Upload Photo
9/2/033/0002-311	66 Somerset Street, Graaff-Reinet	3 bay saddle roofed house with triangular end gables and verandah. Low-pitch saddle roof with hipped triangular gables with mock chimneys. Wall has fluted pilasters at door and eyebrow mouldings. Verandah with hipped ogee roof on precast pillars and st Type of site: House Current use: Residential. These buildings, with their Georgian Karoo style and Victorian characteristics and which date mainly from the nineteenth century, form an integral part of the historical and architectural core of Graarf-Reinet, which was founded in 1785.	Graaff-Reinet	Graaff-Reinet	Provincial Heritage Site	32°15′06″S 24°31′58″E	Upload Photo
9/2/033/0002-312	48 Somerset Street, Graaff-Reinet	2 bay cottage with saddle roof, pedimented parapet and verandah. Low-pitch saddle roof with moulded and pedimented end facade with heavy cornice. Possibly originally Karoo-type roof. Wall has moulded door and window architraves. Verandah with straight Type of site: House Current use: Residential. These buildings, with their Georgian Karoo style and Victorian characteristics and which date mainly from the nineteenth century, form an integral part of the historical and architectural core of Graarf-Reinet, which was founded in 1785.	Graaff-Reinet	Graaff-Reinet	Provincial Heritage Site	32°15′04″S 24°32′03″E	Upload Photo
9/2/033/0002-313	7 Park Street, Graaff-Reinet	3 Bay pitched roofed house with covered gables and verandah. Pitched roof covering gables with loft door in right hand end gable. Lean addition to rear. Wall with rustication. Verandah with hipped bullnose roof on precast columns on straight walls with Architectural style: Victorian. Type of site: House Current use: Residential. These buildings, with their Georgian Karoo style and Victorian features, which date mainly from the nineteenth century, form an integral part of the historical and architectural core of Graaff-Reinet, which was founded in 1785.	Graaff-Reinet	Graaff-Reinet	Provincial Heritage Site	32°14′51″S 24°31′53″E	Upload Photo
9/2/033/0002-314	87 Somerset Street, Graaff-Reinet	4 Bay low-pitch roof cottage (probably extended to the left) with stoep. Low-pitch saddle roof with covered end gables with finials and loft door. Wall has coarse plaster with fine plaster architraves at openings and corners. Pilaster at door. Stoep w Architectural style: Victorian. Type of site: House Current use: Residential. These buildings, with their Georgian Karoo style and Victorian features, which date mainly from the nineteenth century, form an integral part of the historical and architectural core of Graaff-Reinet, which was founded in 1785.	Graaff-Reinet	Graaff-Reinet	Provincial Heritage Site	32°15′13″S 24°31′44″E	Upload Photo
9/2/033/0002-315	76 Caledon Street, Graaff-Reinet	A 3-bay Karoo house abutting no. 78 to left side and with a verandah. Flat roof with stepped parapet with moulded cornice, straight slopig parapet to sides. Rusticated with elaborately moulded and panelled timber surround forming pilaster and hood. Vera Architectural style: Karoo-type. Type of site: House Current use: Residential. These buildings, with their Georgian Karoo style and Victorian features, which date mainly from the nineteenth century, form an integral part of the historical and architectural core of Graaff-Reinet, which was founded in 1785.	Graaff-Reinet	Graaff-Reinet	Provincial Heritage Site	32°14′59″S 24°31′54″E	Upload Photo
9/2/033/0002-316	126 Cradock Street, Graaff-Reinet	4 bay Karoo-type house with parapet and stoep. Abuts 124 and arch to 128. Karoo-type roof with straight moulded parapet. Stoep with dwarf side and street walls. 4 panel (upper ones arched) door with plain fanlight. 6 × 6 sashes with louvred shutters. Architectural style: Karoo-type. Type of site: House Current use: Residential. These buildings, with their Georgian Karoo style and Victorian characteristics and which date mainly from the nineteenth century, form an integral part of the historical and architectural core of Graaff-Reinet, which was founded in 1785.	Graaff-Reinet	Graaff-Reinet	Provincial Heritage Site	32°15′17″S 24°31′58″E	Upload Photo
9/2/033/0002-317	6 Park Street, Graaff-Reinet	Long 4 bay house with stepped parapet and moulded cornice. Stoep. Flat roof with stepped parapet with moulded cornice. Wall has hood mouldings and rustication. Concrete stoep slightly raised with coped end wall at right end. 2 × 3 panel double door w Architectural style: Karoo-type. Type of site: House Current use: Residential. These buildings, with their Georgian Karoo style and Victorian features, which date mainly from the nineteenth century, form an integral part of the historical and architectural core of Graaff-Reinet, which was founded in 1785.	Graaff-Reinet	Graaff-Reinet	Provincial Heritage Site	32°14′49″S 24°31′52″E	Upload Photo
9/2/033/0002-318	4 Park Street, Graaff-Reinet	3 Bay pitch-roofed house with verandah. Low-pitched roof covering the end gables. Arched louvred ventilators in end gables. Walls rusticated with shallow, smooth plaster pilasters flanking front door. Verandah with hipped bullnose roofwith fretwork fr Architectural style: Victorian. Type of site: House Current use: Residential. These buildings, with their Georgian Karoo style and Victorian features, which date mainly from the nineteenth century, form an integral part of the historical and architectural core of Graaff-Reinet, which was founded in 1785.	Graaff-Reinet	Graaff-Reinet	Provincial Heritage Site	32°14′49″S 24°31′53″E	Upload Photo
9/2/033/0002-319	106 Caledon Street, Graaff-Reinet	Flat roof with face brick coping to parapet. Verandah with straight roof on facebrick pillars and straight walls with heavy strap coping and diamond relief. Glazed double doorin splayed corner and with 2 pane fanlight. Also in Caledon Street. Single g Architectural style: Karoo-type. Type of site: House Current use: Residential. These buildings, with their Georgian Karoo style and Victorian features, which date mainly from the nineteenth century, form an integral part of the historical and architectural core of Graaff-Reinet, which was founded in 1785.	Graaff-Reinet	Graaff-Reinet	Provincial Heritage Site	32°15′02″S 24°31′45″E	Upload Photo
9/2/033/0002-320	102 Caledon Street, Graaff-Reinet	3 bay Karoo cottage with stoep and steel windows. Flat roof with stepped parapet and cornice. Concrete stoep. Modern flush hollow core door with 2 pane fanlight. Steel horizontal windows. Architectural style: Karoo-style. Type of site: House Current use: Residential. These buildings, with their Georgian Karoo style and Victorian features, which date mainly from the nineteenth century, form an integral part of the historical and architectural core of Graaff-Reinet, which was founded in 1785.	Graaff-Reinet	Graaff-Reinet	Provincial Heritage Site	32°15′01″S 24°31′46″E	Upload Photo
9/2/033/0002-321	100 Caledon Street, Graaff-Reinet	Karoo-type roof with stepped parapet and verandah, also covering garage on left side. Flat roof with stepped parapet cornice. Styraight roofed side walls verandah on precast columns on dipped walls with razor blade motif and tiled (painted). Modern gla Architectural style: Karoo-type. Type of site: House Current use: Residential. These buildings, with their Georgian Karoo style and Victorian features, which date mainly from the nineteenth century, form an integral part of the historical and architectural core of Graaff-Reinet, which was founded in 1785.	Graaff-Reinet	Graaff-Reinet	Provincial Heritage Site	32°15′01″S 24°31′47″E	Upload Photo
9/2/033/0002-322	98 and 98A Caledon Street, Graaff-Reinet	Semi-detached, long Karoo-type houses, with verandah. 3 + 3bays. Karoo-type roof with stepped parapet and simple cornice. Rusticated, raised plaster surrounds about openings and edges. Verandah with red painted concrete slab stoep and hipped ogee roof Architectural style: Karoo-type. Type of site: House Current use: Residential. (2 units, semi-detached). These buildings, with their Georgian Karoo style and Victorian features, which date mainly from the nineteenth century, form an integral part of the historical and architectural core of Graaff-Reinet, which was founded in 1785.	Graaff-Reinet	Graaff-Reinet	Provincial Heritage Site	32°15′01″S 24°31′47″E	Upload Photo
9/2/033/0002-323	13 North Street, Graaff-Reinet	4 bay Karoo-type house with straight parapet and verandah. Karoo-type roof with moulded cornice. Verandah with straight roof on masonry and facebrick wall. Modern glazed door with plain fanlight. 6 × 6 sashes. Architectural style: Karoo-type. Type of site: House Current use: Residential. These buildings, with their Georgian Karoo style and Victorian features, which date mainly from the nineteenth century, form an integral part of the historical and architectural core of Graaff-Reinet, which was founded in 1785.	Graaff-Reinet	Graaff-Reinet	Provincial Heritage Site	32°14′50″S 24°32′11″E	Upload Photo
9/2/033/0002-324	24 Bourke Street, Graaff-Reinet	A 2 wing symmetrical house with verandah between the wings. Pitched and gabled roof with covered front gables and arched louvred ventilators set in gables. Verandah between wings with ogee roof on precast columns on brick piers. 6 panel door with 2 pa Type of site: House Current use: Residential. These buildings, with their Georgian Karoo style and Victorian features, which date mainly from the nineteenth century, form an integral part of the historical and architectural core of Graaff-Reinet, which was founded in 1785.	Graaff-Reinet	Graaff-Reinet	Provincial Heritage Site	32°14′56″S 24°31′55″E	Upload Photo
9/2/033/0002-325	18 North Street, Graaff-Reinet	3 Bay Karoo-type house with straight parapet and stoep with wall. Flat roof with straight parapet with moulded light cornice. Straight sloping parapet with chimney to right hand side. Raised smooth plaster surround framing main facade, hood moulds to o Architectural style: Karoo-type. Type of site: House Current use: Residential. These buildings, with their Georgian Karoo style and Victorian features, which date mainly from the nineteenth century, form an integral part of the historical and architectural core of Graaff-Reinet, which was founded in 1785.	Graaff-Reinet	Graaff-Reinet	Provincial Heritage Site	32°14′51″S 24°32′10″E	Upload Photo
9/2/033/0002-326	42 North Street, Graaff-Reinet	Fine 3 bay Karoo-type house with stepped parapet and walled stoep. Abutting No.40 to right. Flat roof with stepped parapet and moulded cornice. Wall has rusticated and recessed porch. Stone stoep with old plaster. Dipped walls with strap moulded copi Architectural style: Karoo-type. Type of site: House Current use: Residential. These buildings, with their Georgian Karoo style and Victorian features, which date mainly from the nineteenth century, form an integral part of the historical and architectural core of Graaff-Reinet, which was founded in 1785.	Graaff-Reinet	Graaff-Reinet	Provincial Heritage Site	32°14′53″S 24°31′59″E	Upload Photo
9/2/033/0002-327	38 North Street, Graaff-Reinet	3 bay pitched hipped roof house with verandah. Pitched and hipped roof with chimney at right side. Rear gables straight, shoulderd with pinnacles and large rectangular lowered ventilators set in. Low pitched and hipped roof with chimney at right side. Architectural style: Victorian. Type of site: House Current use: Residential. These buildings, with their Georgian Karoo style and Victorian features, which date mainly from the nineteenth century, form an integral part of the historical and architectural core of Graaff-Reinet, which was founded in 1785.	Graaff-Reinet	Graaff-Reinet	Provincial Heritage Site	32°14′53″S 24°32′00″E	Upload Photo
9/2/033/0002-328	24 North Street, Graaff-Reinet	5 Bay pitched, gabled roofed house with shouldered end gables with chimney on right gable and verandah. Abuts no. 22. Pitched gabled cast iron roof. Shouldered end gables with flat pinnacled tops. One with chimney. Loft door to left gable and 2 small v Type of site: House Current use: Residential. These buildings, with their Georgian Karoo style and Victorian features, which date mainly from the nineteenth century, form an integral part of the historical and architectural core of Graaff-Reinet, which was founded in 1785.	Graaff-Reinet	Graaff-Reinet	Provincial Heritage Site	32°14′51″S 24°32′07″E	Upload Photo
9/2/033/0002-329	23 North Street, Graaff-Reinet	Double storey 3 bay (ground floor) house with stepped parapet and verandah with balcony 5 bays above. Karoo-type roof with moulded parapet and cornice. Wall in ground floor rusticated. Eyebrow moulding over one window in upper floor. Concrete balcony Architectural style: Karoo-type. Type of site: House Current use: Residential. These buildings, with their Georgian Karoo style and Victorian features, which date mainly from the nineteenth century, form an integral part of the historical and architectural core of Graaff-Reinet, which was founded in 1785.	Graaff-Reinet	Graaff-Reinet	Provincial Heritage Site	32°14′52″S 24°32′07″E	Upload Photo
9/2/033/0002-330	22 North Street, Graaff-Reinet	3 Bay Karoo-type cottage with roof with projecting eaves to front stoep. Flat 1BR roof extending over parapet, with projecting eaves to front. Wall has smooth raised plaster surrounds to door and windows. Plastered stone stoep with dipped walls with pl Architectural style: Karoo-style. Type of site: House Current use: Residential. These buildings, with their Georgian Karoo style and Victorian features, which date mainly from the nineteenth century, form an integral part of the historical and architectural core of Graaff-Reinet, which was founded in 1785.	Graaff-Reinet	Graaff-Reinet	Provincial Heritage Site	32°14′51″S 24°32′08″E	Upload Photo
9/2/033/0002-331	21 North Street, Graaff-Reinet	5 bay Karoo-type cottage with stepped parapet and stoep. Karoo-type roof with finely moulded stepped parapet. Wall has eyebrow mouldings, fluted pilasters at doors and moulded architraves at windows. Stoep with end walls and seats. 6 panel door with de Architectural style: Karoo-type. Type of site: House Current use: Residential. These buildings, with their Georgian Karoo style and Victorian features, which date mainly from the nineteenth century, form an integral part of the historical and architectural core of Graaff-Reinet, which was founded in 1785.	Graaff-Reinet	Graaff-Reinet	Provincial Heritage Site	32°14′52″S 24°32′08″E	Upload Photo
9/2/033/0002-332	38 Somerset Street, Graaff-Reinet	Small 3 bay house with pedimented parapet and stoep. Karoo-type roof with finely moulded broken pedimented parapet and heavy cornice. Corner ornaments. Wall is rusticated. Quarry tile stoep. Glazed double door (new) with 2 pane fanlight. New wooden Architectural style: Karoo-type. Current use: Office. These buildings, with their Georgian Karoo style and Victorian characteristics and which date mainly from the nineteenth century, form an integral part of the historical and architectural core of Graarf-Reinet, which was founded in 1785.	Graaff-Reinet	Graaff-Reinet	Provincial Heritage Site	33°18′29″S 26°31′07″E	Upload Photo
9/2/033/0002-333	Educamus, 91 Caledon Street, Graaff-Reinet	Elegant, restored corner house with balustrade parapet and stoep with pergola in both streets. Karoo-type roof with high stepped parapets in both streets with frieze, fine mouldings and balustrade with plinths and balls. Facade has moulded corner pilast Architectural style: Pegola added when verandah removed. Current use: Office. These buildings, with their Georgian Karoo style and Victorian features, which date mainly from the nineteenth century, form an integral part of the historical and architectural core of Graaff-Reinet, which was founded in 1785.	Graaff-Reinet	Graaff-Reinet	Provincial Heritage Site	32°15′03″S 24°31′46″E	Upload Photo
9/2/033/0002-334	180 Cradock Street, Graaff-Reinet	3 bay Karoo-type house with high straight parapet and stoep with end walls. Karoo-type roof with high straight parapet with heavy mouldings. Wall has end pilasters and heavy architraves, especially at door, also rustication. Stoep has moulded end walls Architectural style: Karoo-type. Type of site: House Current use: Residential. These buildings, with their Georgian Karoo style and Victorian characteristics and which date mainly from the nineteenth century, form an integral part of the historical, and architectural core of Graaff-Reinet, which was founded in 1785.	Graaff-Reinet	Graaff-Reinet	Provincial Heritage Site	32°15′30″S 24°32′02″E	Upload Photo
9/2/033/0002-335	18 Parsonage Street, Graaff-Reinet	3 bay corner house with saddle roof and verandah in both streets. Abuts no 16. Low-pitch saddle roof. Verandah in both streets with hipped straight roof on tapering, precast pillars and straight, moulded walls. There is a triangular gablet over entran Architectural style: Victorian. Current use: Shop. These buildings, with their Georgian Karoo style and Victorian characteristics and which date mainly from the nineteenth century, form an integral part of the historical and architectural core of Graarf-Reinet, which was founded in 1785.	Graaff-Reinet	Graaff-Reinet	Provincial Heritage Site	32°15′05″S 24°32′15″E	Upload Photo
9/2/033/0002-336	16 Parsonage Street, Graaff-Reinet	3 bay Karoo-type cottage with stepped parapet and walled stoep. Abuts no 18. Karoo-type roof with stepped parapet and heavy cornice. Wall has heavy, moulded door and window architraves. Door one is arched and protruding. Stoep with straight moulded str Architectural style: Karoo-type. Type of site: House Current use: Residential. These buildings, with their Georgian Karoo style and Victorian characteristics and which date mainly from the nineteenth century, form an integral part of the historical and architectural core of Graarf-Reinet, which was founded in 1785.	Graaff-Reinet	Graaff-Reinet	Provincial Heritage Site	32°15′05″S 24°32′14″E	Upload Photo
9/2/033/0002-337	14 Parsonage Street, Graaff-Reinet	3 bay Karoo-type cottage with pedimented parapet and stoep. It is free-standing. Karoo-type cottage with pedimented parapet and stoep. It is free-standing. Karoo-type roof with very low, broken pedimented parapet with coarse edge moulding. Wall has h Architectural style: Karoo-type. Type of site: House Current use: Residential. These buildings, with their Georgian Karoo style and Victorian characteristics and which date mainly from the nineteenth century, form an integral part of the historical and architectural core of Graarf-Reinet, which was founded in 1785.	Graaff-Reinet	Graaff-Reinet	Provincial Heritage Site	32°15′05″S 24°32′15″E	Upload Photo
9/2/033/0002-338	12 Parsonage Street, Graaff-Reinet	3 bay saddle roofed cottage with walled stoep. Free standing. High-pitched saddle roof with shouldered and moulded end gables with mock chimneys. Wall with moulded door and window architraves. Stoep of bricks with moulded and dipped walls and flared s Architectural style: Victorian or Victorianized Cape Dutch. Type of site: House Current use: Residential. These buildings, with their Georgian Karoo style and Victorian characteristics and which date mainly from the nineteenth century, form an integral part of the historical and architectural core of Graarf-Reinet, which was founded in 1785.	Graaff-Reinet	Graaff-Reinet	Provincial Heritage Site	32°15′05″S 24°32′16″E	Upload Photo
9/2/033/0002-339	9 Parsonage Street, Graaff-Reinet	Long 4 bay house with saddle roof and verandah. Abuts 7A. At right end entrance to Red Cross Home. Low-pitch saddle roof with triangular gable at left end, right gable is covered. Wall has moulded architraves and corner mouldings. Verandah with hipped Current use: Antique shop. These buildings, with their Georgian Karoo style and Victorian characteristics and which date mainly from the nineteenth century, form an integral part of the historical and architectural core of Graarf-Reinet, which was founded in 1785.	Graaff-Reinet	Graaff-Reinet	Provincial Heritage Site	32°15′06″S 24°32′16″E	Upload Photo
9/2/033/0002-340	8 Parsonage Street, Graaff-Reinet	3 bay Karoo-type cottage (of same type as no 6) with stepped parapet and walled stoep. Attached to, or abuts, no 6 and no 10. Karoo-type roof with stepped parapet and heavy cornice. Wall has heavy, moulded corners and door and window architraves. Stoe Architectural style: Karoo-type. Type of site: House Current use: Residential. These buildings, with their Georgian Karoo style and Victorian characteristics and which date mainly from the nineteenth century, form an integral part of the historical and architectural core of Graarf-Reinet, which was founded in 1785.	Graaff-Reinet	Graaff-Reinet	Provincial Heritage Site	32°15′04″S 24°32′16″E	Upload Photo
9/2/033/0002-341	44 Somerset Street, Graaff-Reinet	3 bay saddle roofed house with stepped parapet, ornamental verandah and garage extension. Saddle roof (possibly Cape Dutch) with street side stepped parapet with heavy cornice. Wall has rustication, eyebrow mouldings and fluted pilasters. Verandah with Architectural style: Victorianized Cape Dutch?. Type of site: House Current use: Residential. These buildings, with their Georgian Karoo style and Victorian characteristics and which date mainly from the nineteenth century, form an integral part of the historical and architectural core of Graarf-Reinet, which was founded in 1785.	Graaff-Reinet	Graaff-Reinet	Provincial Heritage Site	32°15′04″S 24°32′04″E	Upload Photo
9/2/033/0002-342	3 Parsonage Street, Graaff-Reinet	3 bay end gable building with Karoo-type parapet and verandah. Low-pitch saddle roof with moulded pedimented and parapeted end gable with mock chimney, and corner ornamented fine cornice. Rough plasterd front wall with fine plaster architraves. Veranda Architectural style: Victorian and Karoo-type. Current use: Shop and cafe. These buildings, with their Georgian Karoo style and Victorian characteristics and which date mainly from the nineteenth century, form an integral part of the historical and architectural core of Graarf-Reinet, which was founded in 1785.	Graaff-Reinet	Graaff-Reinet	Provincial Heritage Site	32°15′06″S 24°32′18″E	Upload Photo
9/2/033/0002-343	30 Stockenstroom Street, Graaff-Reinet	3 Bay flatroofed parapeted house with single bay extension to left. Roof-flat stepped parapet with moulded cornice, central. Portion with tiled capping. Walls rusticated. Door modern glazed with 2 pane fanlight. Windows steel, horizontal. Concrete s Type of site: House Current use: Residential. These buildings, with their Georgian Karoo style and Victorian characteristics and which date mainly from the nineteenth century, form an integral part of the historical and architectural core of Graarf-Reinet, which was founded in 1785.	Graaff-Reinet	Graaff-Reinet	Provincial Heritage Site	32°14′56″S 24°31′41″E	Upload Photo
9/2/033/0002-344	176 Cradock Street, Graaff-Reinet	3 bay long Karoo-type house with straight parapet and stoep. Karoo-type roof with straight parapet and heavy cornice. Wall has eyebrow mouldings and heavy moulded architraves. Stone stoep has moulded end walls and seats. 4 × 4 panel double door with de Architectural style: Karoo-type. Type of site: House Current use: Residential. These buildings, with their Georgian Karoo style and Victorian characteristics and which date mainly from the nineteenth century, form an integral part of the historical, and architectural core of Graaff-Reinet, which was founded in 1785.	Graaff-Reinet	Graaff-Reinet	Provincial Heritage Site	32°15′29″S 24°32′02″E	Upload Photo
9/2/033/0002-345	155 Cradock Street, Graaff-Reinet	3 bay Karoo-type cottage with stepped parapet and verandah. Karoo-type roof with moulded stepped parapet. Wall has rustication. Verandah with bullnose roof on fine precast pillars and straight walls with plinths and flared entrance walls. 4 panel door Architectural style: Karoo-style. Type of site: House Current use: Residential. These buildings, with their Georgian Karoo style and Victorian characteristics and which date mainly from the nineteenth century, form an integral part of the historical, and architectural core of Graaff-Reinet, which was founded in 1785.	Graaff-Reinet	Graaff-Reinet	Provincial Heritage Site	32°15′30″S 24°32′04″E	Upload Photo
9/2/033/0002-346	152 Cradock Street, Graaff-Reinet	3 bay Karoo-type cottage with stepped parapet and verandah. Karoo-type roof with stepped parapet. Verandah with bullnose roof on fine precast pillars and dipped walls with razorblade pattern. Edwardian half-glazed door with 2 pane fanlight. Garage (co Architectural style: Karoo-type. Type of site: House Current use: Residential. These buildings, with their Georgian Karoo style and Victorian characteristics and which date mainly from the nineteenth century, form an integral part of the historical, and architectural core of Graaff-Reinet, which was founded in 1785.	Graaff-Reinet	Graaff-Reinet	Provincial Heritage Site	32°15′24″S 24°31′59″E	Upload Photo
9/2/033/0002-347	150 Cradock Street, Graaff-Reinet	5 bay probably Victorianized Cape Dutch house with triangular gable and stoep. Saddle roof with covered central triangular gable with fretwork bargeboarding and arched vent. Wall has heavy eyebrow mouldings and moulded architraves. Stoep with end walls Architectural style: Victorianized Cape Dutch. Type of site: House Current use: Residential. These buildings, with their Georgian Karoo style and Victorian characteristics and which date mainly from the nineteenth century, form an integral part of the historical and architectural core of Graaff-Reinet, which was founded in 1785.	Graaff-Reinet	Graaff-Reinet	Provincial Heritage Site	32°15′23″S 24°31′59″E	Upload Photo
9/2/033/0002-348	138A Cradock Street, Graaff-Reinet	3 + 2 bay Karoo-type cottage with straight parapet and stoep with end walls. Attached to 140. Karoo-type roof with straight, moulded parapet. Stoep with moulded end walls and seats. 2 panel stable door with 3 pane fanlight. 6 × 6 sashes with louvred Architectural style: Karoo-type. Type of site: House Current use: Residential. These buildings, with their Georgian Karoo style and Victorian characteristics and which date mainly from the nineteenth century, form an integral part of the historical and architectural core of Graaff-Reinet, which was founded in 1785.	Graaff-Reinet	Graaff-Reinet	Provincial Heritage Site	32°15′19″S 24°31′59″E	Upload Photo
9/2/033/0002-349	135 Cradock Street, Graaff-Reinet	5 bay Cape Dutch house with thatch and holbol front gable. Freestanding and set back. Thatched saddle roof with central holbol gable with string course and hipped, triangular end gables with mock chimneys. High walls. Narrow stoep. 4 panel wide door w Architectural style: Cape Dutch. Type of site: House Current use: Residential. These buildings, with their Georgian Karoo style and Victorian characteristics and which date mainly from the nineteenth century, form an integral part of the historical and architectural core of Graaff-Reinet, which was founded in 1785.	Graaff-Reinet	Graaff-Reinet	Provincial Heritage Site	32°15′25″S 24°32′02″E	Upload Photo
9/2/033/0002-351	6 Parsonage Street, Graaff-Reinet	3 bay Karoo-type cottage with stepped parapet and walled stoep. Karoo-type roof with stepped parapet and heavy cornice (cont. into no 8). Wall has rustication and moulded door and window architraves. Stoep with dipped, moulded walls. 4 panel door with Architectural style: Karoo-type. Type of site: House Current use: Residential. These buildings, with their Georgian Karoo style and Victorian characteristics and which date mainly from the nineteenth century, form an integral part of the historical and architectural core of Graarf-Reinet, which was founded in 1785.	Graaff-Reinet	Graaff-Reinet	Provincial Heritage Site	32°15′04″S 24°32′17″E	Upload Photo
9/2/033/0002-352	Adampie Cafe, 81 Church Street, Graaff-Reinet	Small 3 bay Karoo-type hall with ornamented end parapet. Free standing. Karoo-roof with parapet with plinths, balls and other late decorations and mouldings. Stoep. 4 × 4 panel double door with 4 pane Edwardian type fanlight. 6 × 6 sashes with louvre Architectural style: Karoo-type. Current use: Cafe. These buildings, with their Georgian Karoo style and Victorian characteristics and which date mainly from the nineteenth century, form an integral part of the historical and architectural core of Graarf-Reinet, which was founded in 1785.	Graaff-Reinet	Graaff-Reinet	Provincial Heritage Site	32°15′17″S 24°32′14″E	Upload Photo
9/2/033/0002-353	27 Somerset Street, Graaff-Reinet	3 bay saddle roofed cottage with stoep. Abuts no 25. Low-pitch slate roof with triangular end gables. Wall has rustication and eyebrow moulding and architraves at door. Brick stoep. 3 × 3 panel double door with decorative fanlight. 12 x 12 sashes wi Type of site: House Current use: Residential. These buildings, with their Georgian Karoo style and Victorian characteristics and which date mainly from the nineteenth century, form an integral part of the historical and architectural core of Graarf-Reinet, which was founded in 1785.	Graaff-Reinet	Graaff-Reinet	Provincial Heritage Site	32°15′03″S 24°32′15″E	Upload Photo
9/2/033/0002-354	25 and 25A Somerset Street, Graaff-Reinet	3 + 3 bay long saddle roof house with central gable and verandah. Abuts no 27. Saddle roof with covered end and central gables with barge boarding at apex at right end gable. Wall has rustication. Verandah with straight roof on masonry pillars and dip Architectural style: Victorianized Cape Dutch. Type of site: House Current use: Residential (2 units). These buildings, with their Georgian Karoo style and Victorian characteristics and which date mainly from the nineteenth century, form an integral part of the historical and architectural core of Graarf-Reinet, which was founded in 1785.	Graaff-Reinet	Graaff-Reinet	Provincial Heritage Site	32°15′03″S 24°32′16″E	Upload Photo
9/2/033/0002-355	17 Parsonage Street, Graaff-Reinet	T-shaped 3 bay house with saddle roof and central covered gable and verandah. Saddle roof covering end and central gables with fretwork bargeboarding and archedvent. Wall has rustication and door and window moulded archutraves. Verandah with straight r Architectural style: Victorianized Cape Dutch. Current use: Old Age Home. These buildings, with their Georgian Karoo style and Victorian characteristics and which date mainly from the nineteenth century, form an integral part of the historical and architectural core of Graarf-Reinet, which was founded in 1785.	Graaff-Reinet	Graaff-Reinet	Provincial Heritage Site	32°15′07″S 24°32′14″E	Upload Photo
9/2/033/0002-356	22 Parsonage Street, Graaff-Reinet	3 bay Karoo-type cottage with stepped parapet, big windows and two doorsas well asa stoep. Karoo-type roof with stepped andm oulded parapet. Moulded architrave at door. Stone stoep. Earlier dipped walls removed. Two 4 panel single doors next to each Architectural style: Karoo-type. Current use: Office. These buildings, with their Georgian Karoo style and Victorian characteristics and which date mainly from the nineteenth century, form an integral part of the historical and architectural core of Graarf-Reinet, which was founded in 1785.	Graaff-Reinet	Graaff-Reinet	Provincial Heritage Site	32°15′05″S 24°32′13″E	Upload Photo
9/2/033/0002-357	Elifa, 90 Stockenstroom Street, Graaff-Reinet	Large Cape Dutch type building along Middle Street but with entrance from Stockenstrom Street and with 2 dwellings. High saddle roofs with finely moulded holbol gables. Main gable in Middle Street with chimney through the gable. 9 × 9 sashes with louvre Architectural style: Cape Dutch Revival. These buildings, with their Georgian Karoo style and Victorian characteristics and which date mainly from the nineteenth century, form an integral part of the historical and architectural core of Graarf-Reinet, which was founded in 1785.	Graaff-Reinet	Graaff-Reinet	Provincial Heritage Site	32°15′20″S 24°31′51″E	Upload Photo
9/2/033/0002-358	79 Stockenstroom Street, Graaff-Reinet	Small 2 bay Karoo-type cottage with pediment and walled stoep. Abuts, or is attached to no. 82. Karoo-type roof with moulded pedimented parapet with rounded apex. Wall has plain moulded door and window architraves. Stoep with capped side walls and low Architectural style: Karoo-type. Type of site: House Current use: Residential. These buildings, with their Georgian Karoo style and Victorian characteristics and which date mainly from the nineteenth century, form an integral part of the historical and architectural core of Graarf-Reinet, which was founded in 1785.	Graaff-Reinet	Graaff-Reinet	Provincial Heritage Site	32°15′06″S 24°31′48″E	Upload Photo
9/2/033/0002-359	77 Stockenstroom Street, Graaff-Reinet	3 bay pointed roof cottage with verandah and garage extension. Low-pitch pointed roof. Wall has plain moulded door and window architraves. Verandah with bullnose roof on square, decorated pillars and moulded, dipped walls with decoration, and flated dw Architectural style: Victorian/Edwardian. Type of site: House Current use: Residential. These buildings, with their Georgian Karoo style and Victorian characteristics and which date mainly from the nineteenth century, form an integral part of the historical and architectural core of Graarf-Reinet, which was founded in 1785.	Graaff-Reinet	Graaff-Reinet	Provincial Heritage Site	32°15′06″S 24°31′46″E	Upload Photo
9/2/033/0002-360	20 Parsonage Street, Graaff-Reinet	Karoo-type long 5 bay corner house with straight parapets and verandah in both streets. Karoo-type roof with high, straight parapet with moulded cornice and dentils. Verandah in both streets with hipped ogee roofs with friezed, supports and railings in Architectural style: Karoo-type. Type of site: House Current use: Residential. These buildings, with their Georgian Karoo style and Victorian characteristics and which date mainly from the nineteenth century, form an integral part of the historical and architectural core of Graarf-Reinet, which was founded in 1785.	Graaff-Reinet	Graaff-Reinet	Provincial Heritage Site	32°15′05″S 24°32′13″E	Upload Photo
9/2/033/0002-361	49 Stockenstroom Street, Graaff-Reinet	3 Bay Karoo-type cottage with stepped parapet and verandah. Roof with stepped parapet. Traces of former left hand side and dipped side parapet raised to accommodate new roof. Mono-pitch sloping left to right. Verandah has hipped, straight roof on precast Architectural style: Karoo-type. Type of site: House Current use: Residential. These buildings, with their Georgian Karoo style and Victorian characteristics and which date mainly from the nineteenth century, form an integral part of the historical and architectural core of Graarf-Reinet, which was founded in 1785.	Graaff-Reinet	Graaff-Reinet	Provincial Heritage Site	32°14′57″S 24°31′45″E	Upload Photo
9/2/033/0002-362	10 Stockenstroom Street, Graaff-Reinet	Small 3 bay cottage and verandah. Pitched roof with smooth raised plaster surrounds to openings. Gable with fretwork bargeboardings, 3 finials and circular louvred set in gable vent. Corners rusticate plaster. Verandah with bullnose roof on heavily ru Architectural style: Victorian. Type of site: House Current use: Residential. These buildings, with their Georgian Karoo style and Victorian characteristics and which date mainly from the nineteenth century, form an integral part of the historical and architectural core of Graarf-Reinet, which was founded in 1785.	Graaff-Reinet	Graaff-Reinet	Provincial Heritage Site	32°14′51″S 24°31′39″E	Upload Photo
9/2/033/0002-363	48 Stockenstroom Street, Graaff-Reinet	3 Bay Karoo-type cottage with straight parapet and stoep. Flat roof with straight parapet and cornice. Stepped side parapets. Smooth raised plaster surrounds about openings. Concrete stoep withflower beds. Stable type door with single pane fanlight a Architectural style: Karoo-type. Type of site: House Current use: Residential. These buildings, with their Georgian Karoo style and Victorian characteristics and which date mainly from the nineteenth century, form an integral part of the historical and architectural core of Graarf-Reinet, which was founded in 1785.	Graaff-Reinet	Graaff-Reinet	Provincial Heritage Site	32°15′01″S 24°31′43″E	Upload Photo
9/2/033/0002-364	46 Stockenstroom Street, Graaff-Reinet	3 Bay Karoo-type house with stepped parapet and walled stoep. Flat roof with stepped parapet and moulded cornice. Stepped parapets with strap mouldings to side. Walls rough cast with raised smooth plaster surrounds. Stoep has dipped side and front wal Architectural style: Karoo-type. Type of site: House Current use: Residential. These buildings, with their Georgian Karoo style and Victorian characteristics and which date mainly from the nineteenth century, form an integral part of the historical and architectural core of Graarf-Reinet, which was founded in 1785.	Graaff-Reinet	Graaff-Reinet	Provincial Heritage Site	32°15′00″S 24°31′43″E	Upload Photo
9/2/033/0002-365	45 Stockenstroom Street, Graaff-Reinet	3 Bay house with stepped parapet, verandah and garage extension. Flat roof with stepped parapet and string course with stepped side parapets. Smooth raised plaster surrounds to openings, edging and below string course with step down over central bay. V Architectural style: Karoo-type. Type of site: House Current use: Residential. These buildings, with their Georgian Karoo style and Victorian characteristics and which date mainly from the nineteenth century, form an integral part of the historical and architectural core of Graarf-Reinet, which was founded in 1785.	Graaff-Reinet	Graaff-Reinet	Provincial Heritage Site	32°14′56″S 24°31′44″E	Upload Photo
9/2/033/0002-366	44 Stockenstroom Street, Graaff-Reinet	Small 2 bay Karoo-type cottage set back and free-standing. Flat roof withstepped parapet with recessed panels. Wall has st edges/corners. Ruled plaster joints. Stoep with triangular coping and pier, straight street wall and side wall. Architectural style: Karoo-type. Type of site: House Current use: Residential. These buildings, with their Georgian Karoo style and Victorian characteristics and which date mainly from the nineteenth century, form an integral part of the historical and architectural core of Graarf-Reinet, which was founded in 1785.	Graaff-Reinet	Graaff-Reinet	Provincial Heritage Site	32°15′00″S 24°31′42″E	Upload Photo
9/2/033/0002-367	33 Stockenstroom Street, Graaff-Reinet	3 Bay house with left bay double-storey. Flat roof with straight parapet with strap mould. Pulley above door. Abba kaggel to rear. No verandah. Arched entrance door diagnolly battened, half glazed. Door to first floor. 2 small windows with solid sh Architectural style: Karoo-type. Type of site: House Current use: Residential. These buildings, with their Georgian Karoo style and Victorian characteristics and which date mainly from the nineteenth century, form an integral part of the historical and architectural core of Graarf-Reinet, which was founded in 1785.	Graaff-Reinet	Graaff-Reinet	Provincial Heritage Site	32°14′53″S 24°31′42″E	Upload Photo
9/2/033/0002-368	32 Stockenstroom Street, Graaff-Reinet	2 Bay flatroofed cottage, flat parapet. Strap mould at top. Walls rusticated. Door glazed (modern) with 4 pane fanlight. 12 x 12 sliding sash. Concrete stoep with flanking walls with triangular coping. Iron railing. No 34: 2 Bay flatroofed cottage Architectural style: Karoo-type. Type of site: House Current use: Residential. These buildings, with their Georgian Karoo style and Victorian characteristics and which date mainly from the nineteenth century, form an integral part of the historical and architectural core of Graarf-Reinet, which was founded in 1785.	Graaff-Reinet	Graaff-Reinet	Provincial Heritage Site	32°14′57″S 24°31′42″E	Upload Photo
9/2/033/0002-369	8 Park Street, Graaff-Reinet	5 Bay house with wavy parapet portico and tar pole pergola. Bay windows on outerbays. Flat roof with moulded, wavy parapet and moulded cornice. Stepped parapets to sides. Stoep with capped, masonry pillars with pergola and dipped walls with moulded copi Architectural style: Karoo-type. Type of site: House Current use: Residential. These buildings, with their Georgian Karoo style and Victorian features, which date mainly from the nineteenth century, form an integral part of the historical and architectural core of Graaff-Reinet, which was founded in 1785.	Graaff-Reinet	Graaff-Reinet	Provincial Heritage Site	32°14′49″S 24°31′51″E	Upload Photo
9/2/033/0002-370	72 Stockenstroom Street, Graaff-Reinet	Large Victorian square, corner-mansion with central gable and verandah in two streets. High-pitched, hipped saddle roofs with central covered gable with finial and circular vent. High facebrick foundation under verandahs with steps. Verandah on three sid Architectural style: Victorian or Victorianized Cape Dutch. Type of site: House Current use: Residential. These buildings, with their Georgian Karoo style and Victorian characteristics and which date mainly from the nineteenth century, form an integral part of the historical and architectural core of Graarf-Reinet, which was founded in 1785.	Graaff-Reinet	Graaff-Reinet	Provincial Heritage Site	32°15′13″S 24°31′47″E	Upload Photo
9/2/033/0002-371	4 Bourke Street, Graaff-Reinet	3-bay house abuts no. 6 left hand side. Flat roofed roof with straight parapet with string course and strap moulded upperledge. A stoep paved with precast concrete paving blocks. 4 Panel security door. 3 × 3 panel double door with 2 arched pane fanlight Architectural style: Karoo-type. Type of site: House Current use: Residential. These buildings, with their Georgian Karoo style and Victorian features, which date mainly from the nineteenth century, form an integral part of the historical and architectural core of Graaff-Reinet, which was founded in 1785.	Graaff-Reinet	Graaff-Reinet	Provincial Heritage Site	32°14′51″S 24°31′55″E	Upload Photo
9/2/033/0002-372	91 Cradock Street, Graaff-Reinet	Small and simple 3 bay Karoo-type cottage with parapet and stoep. Abuts no 89. Karoo type roof with stepped parapet and moulded cornice. Stone stoep. 4 panel (top ones arched) door with 2 pane fanlight. 6 × 6 sashes with louvred shutters. Wooden pas Architectural style: Karoo-type. Type of site: House Current use: Residential. These buildings, with their Georgian Karoo style and Victorian features, which date mainly from the nineteenth century, form an integral part of the historical and architectural core of Graaff-Reinet, which was founded in 1785.	Graaff-Reinet	Graaff-Reinet	Provincial Heritage Site	32°15′12″S 24°31′57″E	Upload Photo
9/2/033/0002-373	15 Cradock Street, Graaff-Reinet	Cape Dutch asymmetrical winged house with hipped roof and verandah and gabled to front. Hipped roof with curvilinear gable on wing. Ealls are rusticated. Tiled ventilator set in gable within plaster mould, pedimented to top and terrazzzo tiled stoep. Architectural style: Cape Dutch revival. Type of site: House Current use: Residential. These buildings, with their Georgian Karoo style and Victorian features, which date mainly from the nineteenth century, form an integral part of the historical and architectural core of Graaff-Reinet, which was founded in 1785.	Graaff-Reinet	Graaff-Reinet	Provincial Heritage Site	32°14′48″S 24°31′48″E	Upload Photo
9/2/033/0002-374	62 Bourke Street, Graaff-Reinet	Free-standing, set back, double-storey Victorian house with double-storey verandah. Low-pith saddle roof with high chimney at each end. Wall has plaster corner quoins and architraves. Double-storey verandah of wood with hipped bullnose roof, fretwork f Architectural style: Victorian. Type of site: House Current use: Residential. These buildings, with their Georgian Karoo style and Victorian features, which date mainly from the nineteenth century, form an integral part of the historical and architectural core of Graaff-Reinet, which was founded in 1785.	Graaff-Reinet	Graaff-Reinet	Provincial Heritage Site	32°15′11″S 24°32′01″E	Upload Photo
9/2/033/0002-375	28 North Street, Graaff-Reinet	4 Bay Karoo-type house with stepped parapet and verandah. Flat roof with stepped and parapet with string course to front sloping parapet with heavy plaster band to right hand side and stepped parapet to left hand side. Wall has rustication with smooth r Architectural style: Karoo-type. Type of site: House Current use: Residential. These buildings, with their Georgian Karoo style and Victorian features, which date mainly from the nineteenth century, form an integral part of the historical and architectural core of Graaff-Reinet, which was founded in 1785.	Graaff-Reinet	Graaff-Reinet	Provincial Heritage Site	32°14′51″S 24°32′06″E	Upload Photo
9/2/033/0002-376	3 Queen Street, Graaff-Reinet	3 Bay house with mono-pitch corrugated iron roof and flat parapet with stoep. Mona-pitch roof sloping from right to left with parapeted main and right facade with moulded cornice. High plinth. Wall has four hood moulds. Stoep on high plinth with dipp Architectural style: Karoo-type. Type of site: House Current use: Residential. These buildings, with their Georgian Karoo style and Victorian features, which date mainly from the nineteenth century, form an integral part of the historical and architectural core of Graaff-Reinet, which was founded in 1785.	Graaff-Reinet	Graaff-Reinet	Provincial Heritage Site	32°14′38″S 24°31′47″E	Upload Photo
9/2/033/0002-377	83 Church Street, Graaff-Reinet	3 bay part of a long, low-pitch saddle-roofed building with front parapet. Saddle roof with front parapet with moulded cornice. End gable has arched opening. Edwardian type 4 panel door with 2 pane fanlight. New sashes with louvred shutters (closed). Type of site: House Current use: Residential. These buildings, with their Georgian Karoo style and Victorian features, which date mainly from the nineteenth century, form an integral part of the historical and architectural core of Graaff-Reinet, which was founded in 1785.	Graaff-Reinet	Graaff-Reinet	Provincial Heritage Site	32°15′17″S 24°32′15″E	Upload Photo
9/2/033/0002-379	5 Donkin Street, Graaff-Reinet	4 Bay Karoo-type house with parapet and stoep with end walls (one blank bay to right) with extension to left. Flat roof with straight parapet with moulded cornice. Wall with hood mouldings, rusticated and corner quoins. Rustication and quoins continue to Architectural style: Karoo-type. Type of site: House Current use: Residential. These buildings, with their Georgian Karoo style and Victorian features, which date mainly from the nineteenth century, form an integral part of the historical and architectural core of Graaff-Reinet, which was founded in 1785.	Graaff-Reinet	Graaff-Reinet	Provincial Heritage Site	32°14′58″S 24°31′38″E	Upload Photo
9/2/033/0002-380	140 Cradock Street, Graaff-Reinet	4 bay Karoo-style cottage with parapet and stoep with end walls. Attached to 138 and 142. Karoo-type roof with straight moulded parapet. Stoep with moulded end walls and seats. 2 panel stable door with 3 pane fanlight. 6 × 6 sashes with louvred shutt Type of site: House Current use: Residential. These buildings, with their Georgian Karoo style and Victorian features, which date mainly from the nineteenth century, form an integral part of the historical and architectural core of Graaff-Reinet, which was founded in 1785.	Graaff-Reinet	Graaff-Reinet	Provincial Heritage Site	32°15′20″S 24°31′58″E	Upload Photo
9/2/033/0002-381	2 Bourke Street, Graaff-Reinet	Single-storey u-plan corner house, 3 + 1 bay extension to left. Pitch edge and hipped cast iron roof with gables to rear. Loft doors set in both gable ends. Pinnacles of gables projecting through cast iron roof. Plastered walls with rustication. Ornate o Type of site: House Current use: Residential. These buildings, with their Georgian Karoo style and Victorian features, which date mainly from the nineteenth century, form an integral part of the historical and architectural core of Graaff-Reinet, which was founded in 1785.	Graaff-Reinet	Graaff-Reinet	Provincial Heritage Site	32°14′51″S 24°31′54″E	Upload Photo
9/2/033/0002-382	15 and 15A Rabie Street, Graaff-Reinet	Long 2 + 3 bay Karoo-type house with stepped parapet and verandah. Karoo-type roof with stepped parapet. High walls. Verandah with hipped straight roof on precast pillars and moulded convex walls with balusters. 6 panel doors with 2 pane fanlights. 2 Architectural style: Karoo-type. Type of site: House Current use: Residential (2 units). These buildings, with their Georgian Karoo style and Victorian features, which date mainly from the nineteenth century, form an integral part of the historical and architectural core of Graaff-Reinet, which was founded in 1785.	Graaff-Reinet	Graaff-Reinet	Provincial Heritage Site	32°15′00″S 24°32′01″E	Upload Photo
9/2/033/0002-383	17 Caroline Street, Graaff-Reinet	3 bay Karoo-type cottage with stepped parapet and stoep. Karoo-type roof with stepped parapet and stoep. Karoo-type roof with stepped parapet and heavy cornice. Stoep with end walls. Heavy late verandah removed since original survey. 4 panel late door Architectural style: Karoo-type. Type of site: House Current use: Residential. These buildings, with their Georgian Karoo style and Victorian features, which date mainly from the nineteenth century, form an integral part of the historical and architectural core of Graaff-Reinet, which was founded in 1785.	Graaff-Reinet	Graaff-Reinet	Provincial Heritage Site	32°15′13″S 24°32′07″E	Upload Photo
9/2/033/0002-384	Tattersalls, 14 Market Square, Graaff-Reinet	5 bay saddle roof house with verandah. Freestanding. Low pitch roof covering gables with bargeboarding. Verandah with hipped ogee roof on precast pillars and facebrick dwarf wall. Ceramic tile floor. Glazed double door with fine moulded fanlight. 2 Architectural style: Victorian on Victorianized Cape Dutch. Type of site: House Current use: Residential. These buildings, with their Georgian Karoo style and Victorian features, which date mainly from the nineteenth century, form an integral part of the historical and architectural core of Graaff-Reinet, which was founded in 1785.	Graaff-Reinet	Graaff-Reinet	Provincial Heritage Site	32°14′57″S 24°32′15″E	Upload Photo
9/2/033/0002-385	63 Bourke Street, Graaff-Reinet	7 bay Karoo-type house with stepped parapet and stoep with pergola. Karoo-type roof with stepped parapet and heavy cornice. Walls are rusticated with corner quo pins and plain plaster architraves. Tiled stoep with pergola of capped masonry pillars. Curve Architectural style: Karoo-type. Type of site: House Current use: Residential. These buildings, with their Georgian Karoo style and Victorian features, which date mainly from the nineteenth century, form an integral part of the historical and architectural core of Graaff-Reinet, which was founded in 1785.	Graaff-Reinet	Graaff-Reinet	Provincial Heritage Site	32°15′13″S 24°32′05″E	Upload Photo
9/2/033/0002-386	6 Donkin Street, Graaff-Reinet	4 bay saddle roofed house with verandah. Abuts 4. Saddle roof with finials. Walls has rustication. Verandah with hipped ogee roof on precast pillars and dipped, moulded walls with plinths. 3 × 3 panel double door with Edwardian type 2 pane fanlight. 2 Architectural style: Victorianized or Victorian. Type of site: House Current use: Residential. These buildings, with their Georgian Karoo style and Victorian features, which date mainly from the nineteenth century, form an integral part of the historical and architectural core of Graaff-Reinet, which was founded in 1785.	Graaff-Reinet	Graaff-Reinet	Provincial Heritage Site	32°15′06″S 24°31′37″E	Upload Photo
9/2/033/0002-387	26 Bourke Street, Graaff-Reinet	A 3-bay, high-walled stone house with pitched roof and stoep. Free standing. Lean-to additions to rear loft door in both end gables. Painted stone walls. Concrete stoep. 3 × 3 panel double door with radial fanlight with flush lower panels and good br Type of site: House Current use: Residential. These buildings, with their Georgian Karoo style and Victorian features, which date mainly from the nineteenth century, form an integral part of the historical and architectural core of Graaff-Reinet, which was founded in 1785.	Graaff-Reinet	Graaff-Reinet	Provincial Heritage Site	32°14′56″S 24°31′56″E	Upload Photo
9/2/033/0002-388	7 Cradock Street, Graaff-Reinet	Long 4 bay house with pitched roof and verandah with parapet end gables. Pitch roof. Right gable end has arched door and wooden staircase. (not original). Walls have rustication with raised smooth plaster surrounds to openings and corners. Verandah wi Type of site: House Current use: Residential. These buildings, with their Georgian Karoo style and Victorian features, which date mainly from the nineteenth century, form an integral part of the historical and architectural core of Graaff-Reinet, which was founded in 1785.	Graaff-Reinet	Graaff-Reinet	Provincial Heritage Site	32°14′44″S 24°31′47″E	Upload Photo
9/2/033/0002-389	34 Church Street, Graaff-Reinet	3 bay saddle roofed cottage with 2 small triangular front gables and very heavy cornices. Saddle roof with 2 covered triangular gables with fretwork bargeboarding, finials and circular vents. Roof has ornamental cast iron crest. Facade has plaster quo Architectural style: Victorian. Current use: Function hall for hotel. These buildings, with their Georgian Karoo style and Victorian features, which date mainly from the nineteenth century, form an integral part of the historical and architectural core of Graaff-Reinet, which was founded in 1785.	Graaff-Reinet	Graaff-Reinet	Provincial Heritage Site	32°15′08″S 24°32′09″E	Upload Photo
9/2/033/0002-394	1 Bourke Street, Graaff-Reinet	L-plan house with pitched gabled corrugated iron roof. Abuts neighbours. Shouldered end gables (with pinnacles) and covered triangular front gables, 2 in Bourke Street. One in van Ryneveld Square. Arched loft doors in end gables and arched louvred ventil Type of site: House Current use: Residential. These buildings, with their Georgian Karoo style and Victorian features, which date mainly from the nineteenth century, form an integral part of the historical and architectural core of Graaff-Reinet, which was founded in 1785.	Graaff-Reinet	Graaff-Reinet	Provincial Heritage Site	32°14′53″S 24°31′57″E	Upload Photo
9/2/033/0002-395	23 Cradock Street, Graaff-Reinet	4 bay Karoo-type house with asymmetrical stepped parapet and moulded cornice and strap edge and stoep attached to or abutting no. 25. Flat roof with stepped parapet and mouldings. Smooth raised plaster surrounds to openings and edges. Concrete stoep wi Architectural style: Karoo-type. Type of site: House Current use: Residential. These buildings, with their Georgian Karoo style and Victorian features, which date mainly from the nineteenth century, form an integral part of the historical and architectural core of Graaff-Reinet, which was founded in 1785.	Graaff-Reinet	Graaff-Reinet	Provincial Heritage Site	32°14′52″S 24°31′50″E	Upload Photo
9/2/033/0002-396	24 Donkin Street, Graaff-Reinet	4 bay Karoo-type cottage with straight parapet and stoep. Abuts 26. Karoo-type roof with heavily moulded straight cornice. Wall has heavy eyebrow mouldings and plain moulded architraves. Stoep with end walls and seats (probably new). 4 × 4 panel double Architectural style: Karoo-type. Type of site: House Current use: Residential. These buildings, with their Georgian Karoo style and Victorian features, which date mainly from the nineteenth century, form an integral part of the historical and architectural core of Graaff-Reinet, which was founded in 1785.	Graaff-Reinet	Graaff-Reinet	Provincial Heritage Site	32°15′15″S 24°31′41″E	Upload Photo
9/2/033/0002-397	87, 89, 91Cradock Street, Graaff-Reinet	Long 7 bay house with saddle roof, central gable and verandah. Low-pitch roof with covered central gable with bargeboard, finial and rectangular louvred vent. End gable has loft door. Wall has heavy, plain architraves at door and window. Verandah with Architectural style: Victorian, possibly Victorianized Cape Dutch. Type of site: House Current use: Residential. These buildings, with their Georgian Karoo style and Victorian features, which date mainly from the nineteenth century, form an integral part of the historical and architectural core of Graaff-Reinet, which was founded in 1785.	Graaff-Reinet	Graaff-Reinet	Provincial Heritage Site	32°15′12″S 24°31′57″E	Upload Photo
9/2/033/0002-398	Camdeboo Restaurant, 32 Church Street, Graaff-Reinet	3 bay Karoo-type cottage with pedimented parapet. The Karoo-type roof has a pedimented parapet with fine edge mouldings and heavy cornice. Half-glazed double door with small panes fanlight. 9 × 9 sashes. Architectural style: Karoo-type. Type of site: Commercial Current use: Restaurant. These buildings, with their Georgian Karoo style and Victorian features, which date mainly from the nineteenth century, form an integral part of the historical and architectural core of Graaff-Reinet, which was founded in 1785.	Graaff-Reinet	Graaff-Reinet	Provincial Heritage Site	32°15′08″S 24°32′09″E	Upload Photo
9/2/033/0002-399	63 Caledon Street, Graaff-Reinet	Corner house with wing on right side and street verandah (Caledon Street). Saddle roof and covered gables which have fretwork bargeboarding, finials and semi-circle, vent in Milner Street. Walls have rustication, plain corner moulds and heavy eyebrow mo Architectural style: Late Victorian or Edwardian. Type of site: House Current use: Residential. These buildings, with their Georgian Karoo style and Victorian features, which date mainly from the nineteenth century, form an integral part of the historical and architectural core of Graaff-Reinet, which was founded in 1785.	Graaff-Reinet	Graaff-Reinet	Provincial Heritage Site	32°15′01″S 24°31′55″E	Upload Photo
9/2/033/0002-400	6 Parliament Street, Graaff-Reinet	3 bay Victorian winged house with decorated verandah. Hipped roof covering gable with fretwork bargeboarding and archedvent. 3 finials. Walls have rustication, corner quoins and moulded architraves. Verandah has hipped ogee roof with fretwork fringe, Architectural style: Victorian. Type of site: House Current use: Residential. These buildings, with their Georgian Karoo style and Victorian features, which date mainly from the nineteenth century, form an integral part of the historical and architectural core of Graaff-Reinet, which was founded in 1785.	Graaff-Reinet	Graaff-Reinet	Provincial Heritage Site	32°15′07″S 24°32′06″E	Upload Photo
9/2/033/0002-401	Trinity Methodist Church, 53 Caledon Street, Graaff-Reinet	Neo-Gothic hall church with high-pitched roof, rounded point windows and end gables. High pitched slate roof with cast iron ridge crest and hut-shaped vents. Gable and side wall shave heavy plaster mouldings and rustication. Pilasters and half buttress Architectural style: Neo-Gothic. Type of site: Church Current use: Church.	Graaff-Reinet	Graaff-Reinet	Provincial Heritage Site	32°14′59″S 24°32′00″E	Neo-Gothic hall church with high-pitched roof, rounded point windows and end gables. High pitched slate roof with cast iron ridge crest and hut-shaped vents. Gable and side wall shave heavy plaster mouldings and rustication. Pilasters and half buttress Architectural style: Neo-Gothic. Type of site: Church Current use: Church.
9/2/033/0002-402	Jan Rupert Centre, 41–43 Middle Street, Graaff-Reinet	A Neo-Gothic hall church with gable end on the street. Low-pitch roof with triangular end gable with edge moulding, corner plinths andmock chimney. Wall has edge mouldings and architraves for doors and windows. 2 pointed doors. 4 pointed, arched window Architectural style: Neo-Gothic. Current use: Art Centre. These buildings, with their Georgian Karoo style and Victorian features, which date mainly from the nineteenth century, form an integral part of the historical and architectural core of Graaff-Reinet, which was founded in 1785.	Graaff-Reinet	Graaff-Reinet	Provincial Heritage Site	32°15′15″S 24°32′15″E	Upload Photo
9/2/033/0002-403	Manse, 57 Caledon Street, Graaff-Reinet	Double storey villa with wing on right side and double storey verandah in wood. High hipped roof with covered wing gable with fretwork bargeboarding finial and cross vent. Plastered walls are rusticated with quoins. 2 storey wooden verandah with fretwork Architectural style: Late Victorian. Type of site: Parsonage Current use: Church offices.	Graaff-Reinet	Graaff-Reinet	Provincial Heritage Site	32°15′00″S 24°31′57″E	Upload Photo
9/2/033/0002-404	Dudley Hall, 55 Caledon Street, Graaff-Reinet	The church is linked by flat-roofed section to the church hall, which has a Neo-Classical gable facade with a lower pitch. The saddle roof is covered with slate and has a lower pitch than the church. It is richly decorated. The walls are rusticated with Architectural style: Neo-Classical. Current use: Church Hall.	Graaff-Reinet	Graaff-Reinet	Provincial Heritage Site	32°15′00″S 24°31′58″E	The church is linked by flat-roofed section to the church hall, which has a Neo-Classical gable facade with a lower pitch. The saddle roof is covered with slate and has a lower pitch than the church. It is richly decorated. The walls are rusticated with Architectural style: Neo-Classical. Current use: Church Hall.
9/2/033/0002-405	142 Cradock Street, Graaff-Reinet	Low-pitch saddle roof house with end gable towards street and 3 bay unit with stoep below gable. Attached to 140. Low pitch roof with pedimented end gable with heavy mouldings, corner plinths and vent. Stoep with straight walls. 2 panel stable door wit Type of site: House Current use: Residential. These buildings, with their Georgian Karoo style and Victorian features, which date mainly from the nineteenth century, form an integral part of the historical and architectural core of Graaff-Reinet, which was founded in 1785.	Graaff-Reinet	Graaff-Reinet	Provincial Heritage Site	32°15′21″S 24°31′58″E	Upload Photo
9/2/033/0002-406	60 Bourke Street, Graaff-Reinet	Low-pitch saddle roof with fretwork bargeboarding and finials on broad end gables. Verandah with hipped, concave roof with fretwork fringe, supports and railing. Stoep and modern pergola on side. 3 × 3 panel double door with 2 pane fanlight. 2 × 2 sashe Architectural style: Victorian. Type of site: House Current use: Residential. These buildings, with their Georgian Karoo style and Victorian features, which date mainly from the nineteenth century, form an integral part of the historical and architectural core of Graaff-Reinet, which was founded in 1785.	Graaff-Reinet	Graaff-Reinet	Provincial Heritage Site	32°15′09″S 24°32′01″E	Upload Photo
9/2/033/0002-407	24 and 26 Somerset Street, Graaff-Reinet	6 bay Victorian house with saddle roof and stoep. Saddle roof covering the gables end. Arched loft door. Wall rusticated. Brick stoep. Three 2 × 2 panel (upper ones arched double doors with 2 panes (arched fanlights. 2 × 2 sashes (upper ones arched Architectural style: Victorian/Edwardian. Current use: Offices?. These buildings, with their Georgian Karoo style and Victorian features, which date mainly from the nineteenth century, form an integral part of the historical and architectural core of Graaff-Reinet, which was founded in 1785.	Graaff-Reinet	Graaff-Reinet	Provincial Heritage Site	32°15′01″S 24°32′11″E	Upload Photo
9/2/033/0002-408	12 Church Square, Graaff-Reinet	3 Bay double-storey corner house with double-storey balcony. Pitched hipped slate roof with a chimney att each end with chimney pots. Walls with rustication and raised smooth and sked plaster surrounds to openings and edges. New double-storey balcony. Type of site: House Current use: Residential. These buildings, with their Georgian Karoo style and Victorian features, which date mainly from the nineteenth century, form an integral part of the historical and architectural core of Graaff-Reinet, which was founded in 1785.	Graaff-Reinet	Graaff-Reinet	Provincial Heritage Site	32°15′01″S 24°32′06″E	Upload Photo
9/2/033/0002-409	16 Donkin Street, Graaff-Reinet	3 bay Karoo-type cottage with stepped parapet and verandah. Karoo-type roof with stepped parapet and heavy cornice. Wall with rustication. Verandah with hipped ogee roof on precast pillars on plinths. Dwarf street wall with plinths. 3 × 3 panel double Architectural style: Karoo-style. Type of site: House Current use: Residential. These buildings, with their Georgian Karoo style and Victorian features, which date mainly from the nineteenth century, form an integral part of the historical and architectural core of Graaff-Reinet, which was founded in 1785.	Graaff-Reinet	Graaff-Reinet	Provincial Heritage Site	32°15′11″S 24°31′39″E	Upload Photo
9/2/033/0002-410	15 Donkin Street, Graaff-Reinet	3 Bay Karoo-type cottage with pedimented parapet and verandah. Shallow pitched roof with low-pitch pedimented parapet with entral tep. Walls have ruled tapering openings. Verandah with straight roofon square pillars and dipped walls. Steel gates. 6 p Architectural style: Karoo-type. Type of site: House Current use: Residential. These buildings, with their Georgian Karoo style and Victorian features, which date mainly from the nineteenth century, form an integral part of the historical and architectural core of Graaff-Reinet, which was founded in 1785.	Graaff-Reinet	Graaff-Reinet	Provincial Heritage Site	32°15′03″S 24°31′38″E	Upload Photo
9/2/033/0002-411	13 Donkin Street, Graaff-Reinet	3 Bay Karoo-type cottage with stepped parapet and verandah. Flat roof with stepped parapet. Verandah with bullnose roof on pipes and dipped walls. Modern door with single pane fanlight. 3 unit horizontal steel windows. Garage to right. Architectural style: Karoo-type. Type of site: House Current use: Residential. These buildings, with their Georgian Karoo style and Victorian features, which date mainly from the nineteenth century, form an integral part of the historical and architectural core of Graaff-Reinet, which was founded in 1785.	Graaff-Reinet	Graaff-Reinet	Provincial Heritage Site	32°15′02″S 24°31′38″E	Upload Photo
9/2/033/0002-412	11 Donkin Street, Graaff-Reinet	4 Bay Karoo-type roof with high parapet edged with facebricks and moulded cornice below. Sloping parapet to sides. Walls with quoins in corners and around door and windows. Hood mouldings over openings. Verandah with straight roof on heavy masonry pil Architectural style: Karoo-type. Type of site: House Current use: Residential. These buildings, with their Georgian Karoo style and Victorian features, which date mainly from the nineteenth century, form an integral part of the historical and architectural core of Graaff-Reinet, which was founded in 1785.	Graaff-Reinet	Graaff-Reinet	Provincial Heritage Site	32°15′01″S 24°31′37″E	Upload Photo
9/2/033/0002-413	46 Bourke Street, Graaff-Reinet	Extension of 42–44 but with different verandah supports and walls. Karoo-type roof with heavily moulded, stepped parapet. Verandah with straight roof on plastered dwarf wall. (Added after 1965). 3 × 3 panel double door with decorative dwarf wall. (Add Architectural style: Karoo-type. Type of site: House Current use: Residential. These buildings, with their Georgian Karoo style and Victorian features, which date mainly from the nineteenth century, form an integral part of the historical and architectural core of Graaff-Reinet, which was founded in 1785.	Graaff-Reinet	Graaff-Reinet	Provincial Heritage Site	32°15′03″S 24°31′58″E	Upload Photo
9/2/033/0002-414	10 Donkin Street, Graaff-Reinet	3 + 2 bay Karoo-type long house with verandah. Karoo-type roof with stepped parapet and heavily moulded cornice. Walls has rustication. Verandah with hipped ogee roof on left half, straight on right half or masonry pillars and dipped walls with plinths Architectural style: Karoo-type. Type of site: House Current use: Residential (2 units). These buildings, with their Georgian Karoo style and Victorian features, which date mainly from the nineteenth century, form an integral part of the historical and architectural core of Graaff-Reinet, which was founded in 1785.	Graaff-Reinet	Graaff-Reinet	Provincial Heritage Site	32°15′08″S 24°31′38″E	Upload Photo
9/2/033/0002-415	118 Caledon Street, Graaff-Reinet	Same as 116. 3 bay cottage with shouldered and pedimented parapet. No verandah. Flat roof with shouldered and pedimented parapet with moulded cornice. Plain moulded architraves at door and windows. Raised smooth plaster surrounds to openings. Edges an Architectural style: Karoo-type. Type of site: House Current use: Residential. These buildings, with their Georgian Karoo style and Victorian features, which date mainly from the nineteenth century, form an integral part of the historical and architectural core of Graaff-Reinet, which was founded in 1785.	Graaff-Reinet	Graaff-Reinet	Provincial Heritage Site	32°15′02″S 24°31′41″E	Upload Photo
9/2/033/0002-416	14 Church Square, Graaff-Reinet	4 bay saddle roofed corner house with plain end gables and stoep. Pitched roof with triangular end gables with arched left door to right gable. Small square ventilator to left gable. Stoep has dipped walls. with pointed tops. Lower portion rough cart w Architectural style: Victorian or Victorianized Cape Dutch. Type of site: House Current use: Residential. These buildings, with their Georgian Karoo style and Victorian features, which date mainly from the nineteenth century, form an integral part of the historical and architectural core of Graaff-Reinet, which was founded in 1785.	Graaff-Reinet	Graaff-Reinet	Provincial Heritage Site	32°15′02″S 24°32′06″E	Upload Photo
9/2/033/0002-417	71 Donkin Street, Graaff-Reinet	4 bay Karoo-type house with stepped parapet and verandah. Garage to the left abutting 69 (same owner). Karoo-type roof with stepped moulded parapet. Verandah with hipped straight roof on rusticated square pillars and straight dwarf wall, with tiled edg Architectural style: Karoo-type. Type of site: House Current use: Residential. These buildings, with their Georgian Karoo style and Victorian features, which date mainly from the nineteenth century, form an integral part of the historical and architectural core of Graaff-Reinet, which was founded in 1785.	Graaff-Reinet	Graaff-Reinet	Provincial Heritage Site	32°15′25″S 24°31′46″E	Upload Photo
9/2/033/0002-418	10 Church Square, Graaff-Reinet	Double storey house with balcony. 3 Bays. Flat roof with straight parapet-strap moulded edge. Walls have rustication on ground floor only. New double balcony with straight hipped roof and pipe supports and iron railing. Concrete stoep and balcony. S Type of site: House Current use: Residential. These buildings, with their Georgian Karoo style and Victorian features, which date mainly from the nineteenth century, form an integral part of the historical and architectural core of Graaff-Reinet, which was founded in 1785.	Graaff-Reinet	Graaff-Reinet	Provincial Heritage Site	32°15′00″S 24°32′04″E	Upload Photo
9/2/033/0002-419	4 Church Square, Graaff-Reinet	This house was built as an extension of 6. Set-back Karoo-type extension with parapet and pergola with moulded upper step and moulded cornice. Flat roof with stepped parapet. Stepped parapet to side. Stone retaining wall with wrought iron railing to st Architectural style: Karoo-type. Type of site: House Current use: Residential. These buildings, with their Georgian Karoo style and Victorian features, which date mainly from the nineteenth century, form an integral part of the historical and architectural core of Graaff-Reinet, which was founded in 1785.	Graaff-Reinet	Graaff-Reinet	Provincial Heritage Site	32°15′00″S 24°32′07″E	Upload Photo
9/2/033/0002-420	6 Church Square, Graaff-Reinet	Double storey, 3 bay parapeted house with balcony. Stepped roof with parapet and moulded cornice, flat straight sloping parapet to side. Balcony (after 1935) with own stepped parapet and heavy masonry pillars inboth levels with wrought iron railings. M Type of site: House Current use: Residential. These buildings, with their Georgian Karoo style and Victorian features, which date mainly from the nineteenth century, form an integral part of the historical and architectural core of Graaff-Reinet, which was founded in 1785.	Graaff-Reinet	Graaff-Reinet	Provincial Heritage Site	32°14′58″S 24°32′03″E	Upload Photo
9/2/033/0002-421	8 Church Square, Graaff-Reinet	Double-storey, 3 bay Karoo-type house with heavy double-storey verandah. Nos 6 and 8 are abutting. Flat roof with stepped parapet and moulded cornice. Face of building has rough past plaster with smooth raised edge forming pilaster to left. Balcony wi Type of site: House Current use: Residential. These buildings, with their Georgian Karoo style and Victorian features, which date mainly from the nineteenth century, form an integral part of the historical and architectural core of Graaff-Reinet, which was founded in 1785.	Graaff-Reinet	Graaff-Reinet	Provincial Heritage Site	32°14′59″S 24°32′04″E	Upload Photo
9/2/033/0002-422	19 Park Street, Graaff-Reinet	3 Bay Karoo-type house with stepped parapet, a walled stoep and a garage extension. Flat roof, sloping side parapets with stepped parapet with heavy string course. Concrete stoep with dipped walls with strap coping. 3 × 3 panel double door (modern repl Architectural style: Karoo-type. Type of site: House Current use: Residential. These buildings, with their Georgian Karoo style and Victorian features, which date mainly from the nineteenth century, form an integral part of the historical and architectural core of Graaff-Reinet, which was founded in 1785.	Graaff-Reinet	Graaff-Reinet	Provincial Heritage Site	32°14′52″S 24°31′51″E	3 Bay Karoo-type house with stepped parapet, a walled stoep and a garage extension. Flat roof, sloping side parapets with stepped parapet with heavy string course. Concrete stoep with dipped walls with strap coping. 3 × 3 panel double door (modern repl Architectural style: Karoo-type. Type of site: House Current use: Residential. These buildings, with their Georgian Karoo style and Victorian features, which date mainly from the nineteenth century, form an integral part of the historical and architectural core of Graaff-Reinet, which was founded in 1785. Media related to 19 Park Street, Graaff-Reinet at Wikimedia Commons
9/2/033/0002-423	18 Park Street, Graaff-Reinet	4 Bay long pitched roofed house with verandah with 5th bay addition under first roof. Roof with covered end gables. Flat roofed addition to left. Loft door in right hand gable. Verandah with straight roof on masonry pillars and walls with diamond moti Architectural style: Victorian. Type of site: House Current use: Residential. These buildings, with their Georgian Karoo style and Victorian features, which date mainly from the nineteenth century, form an integral part of the historical and architectural core of Graaff-Reinet, which was founded in 1785.	Graaff-Reinet	Graaff-Reinet	Provincial Heritage Site	32°14′51″S 24°31′45″E	Upload Photo
9/2/033/0002-424	9 Park Street, Graaff-Reinet	Small 3 bay Karoo-type cottage with straight parapet and verandah. Abuts no. 11. Flat roof with straight parapet and moulded cornice. Straight sloping parapet to left hand side. Rusticated walls. Verandah with straight roof on masonry pillars and di Architectural style: Karoo-type. Type of site: House Current use: Residential. These buildings, with their Georgian Karoo style and Victorian features, which date mainly from the nineteenth century, form an integral part of the historical and architectural core of Graaff-Reinet, which was founded in 1785.	Graaff-Reinet	Graaff-Reinet	Provincial Heritage Site	32°14′51″S 24°31′53″E	Upload Photo
9/2/033/0002-425	18 Church Square, Graaff-Reinet	Big Karoo-type house with facades and beautiful verandah in both streets. Stepped and parapeted Karoo roof with mouldings. Walls rusticated with eyebrow mouldings. Verandah with ogee roof and beautiful fretwork fringes, supports and railings. 4 × 4 pa Architectural style: Karoo-type. Type of site: House Current use: Residential. These buildings, with their Georgian Karoo style and Victorian features, which date mainly from the nineteenth century, form an integral part of the historical and architectural core of Graaff-Reinet, which was founded in 1785.	Graaff-Reinet	Graaff-Reinet	Provincial Heritage Site	32°15′02″S 24°32′06″E	Upload Photo
9/2/033/0002-426	1 Milner Street, Graaff-Reinet	3 bay house with half-hipped roof and verandah on two sides. Free standing. Half-hipped roof with triangular vents. Verandah on two sides with hipped ogee roofon masonry pillars. Edwardian type half-glazed door with side and fanlight. Probably Edward Architectural style: Edwardian. Type of site: House Current use: Residential. These buildings, with their Georgian Karoo style and Victorian features, which date mainly from the nineteenth century, form an integral part of the historical and architectural core of Graaff-Reinet, which was founded in 1785.	Graaff-Reinet	Graaff-Reinet	Provincial Heritage Site	32°15′01″S 24°31′56″E	Upload Photo
9/2/033/0002-427	7 Muller Street, Graaff-Reinet	3 bay Karoo-type cottage with stepped parapet, extension to the left and stoep with one end wall. Karoo-type roof with moulded stepped parapet. Wall has fine eyebrow mouldings. Stoep with one end wall. 4 × 4 panel double door with ornamental fanlight. Architectural style: Karoo-type. Type of site: House Current use: Residential. These buildings, with their Georgian Karoo style and Victorian features, which date mainly from the nineteenth century, form an integral part of the historical and architectural core of Graaff-Reinet, which was founded in 1785.	Graaff-Reinet	Graaff-Reinet	Provincial Heritage Site	32°15′01″S 24°32′02″E	Upload Photo
9/2/033/0002-428	39 Park Street, Graaff-Reinet	Long 4 bay pitched roofed house with verandah. Abuts No. 37. Pitched cast iron roof covering endgables. Loft door in right hand end gable. Concrete stoep. Verandah with straight roof on rusticated square pillars and dipped walls with printed tile cop Type of site: House Current use: Residential. These buildings, with their Georgian Karoo style and Victorian features, which date mainly from the nineteenth century, form an integral part of the historical and architectural core of Graaff-Reinet, which was founded in 1785.	Graaff-Reinet	Graaff-Reinet	Provincial Heritage Site	32°14′55″S 24°31′44″E	Upload Photo
9/2/033/0002-429	7 Cross Street, Graaff-Reinet	3 bay Karoo-type cottage with stepped parapet and stoep. Karoo-type roof with moulded stepped parapet. Stoep with end walls. Edwardian half-glazed door with 3 pane fanlight. Edwardian small pane casement windows with fanlight. Architectural style: Karoo-type. Type of site: House Current use: Residential. These buildings, with their Georgian Karoo style and Victorian features, which date mainly from the nineteenth century, form an integral part of the historical and architectural core of Graaff-Reinet, which was founded in 1785.	Graaff-Reinet	Graaff-Reinet	Provincial Heritage Site	32°15′04″S 24°32′15″E	Upload Photo
9/2/033/0002-430	4 Cross Street, Graaff-Reinet	4 bay Karoo-type roof with stepped moulded parapet. Stoep with facebrick dwarf wall with wrought iron fence. Pipe pergola on wall carries reed roof. 6 pane single door with plain fanlight. Sashes with louvred shutters. Long extension to right with lo Architectural style: Karoo-type. Type of site: House Current use: Residential. These buildings, with their Georgian Karoo style and Victorian features, which date mainly from the nineteenth century, form an integral part of the historical and architectural core of Graaff-Reinet, which was founded in 1785.	Graaff-Reinet	Graaff-Reinet	Provincial Heritage Site	32°15′05″S 24°32′14″E	Upload Photo
9/2/033/0002-431	12 Napier Street, Graaff-Reinet	Saddle roof with covered central gable with fretwork bargeboarding and steel window. Wall rusticated. Remain of moulded cornice under central gable. Verandah with hipped, straight roof on rusticated square pillars and dipped walls. Steps. 2 × 2 panel Architectural style: Victorian. Type of site: House Current use: Residential. These buildings, with their Georgian Karoo style and Victorian features, which date mainly from the nineteenth century, form an integral part of the historical and architectural core of Graaff-Reinet, which was founded in 1785.	Graaff-Reinet	Graaff-Reinet	Provincial Heritage Site	32°14′52″S 24°32′11″E	Upload Photo
9/2/033/0002-432	156–158 Cradock Street, Graaff-Reinet	Long 2 × 3 bays Karoo-type house with straight parapet and stoep. Karoo-type roof with straight parapet and heavy cornice. Wall has heavy and unusual eyebrow mouldings. High stoep with dipped end wall on left side. 4x 4 panel double door with plain fa Architectural style: Karoo-type. Type of site: House Current use: Residential (2 units). These buildings, with their Georgian Karoo style and Victorian features, which date mainly from the nineteenth century, form an integral part of the historical and architectural core of Graaff-Reinet, which was founded in 1785.	Graaff-Reinet	Graaff-Reinet	Provincial Heritage Site	32°15′25″S 24°31′59″E	Upload Photo
9/2/033/0002-433	10 Parliament Street, Graaff-Reinet	Two 3 bay attached Karoo-type cottages with stoep. Karoo-type roof with straight moulded parapet. Wall has moulded architraves. Stoep with end wall. In 1982 verandah on no 8. New stable type doors with 6 pane fanlight. New 9 × 9 sashes with louvred Architectural style: Karoo-type. Type of site: House Current use: Residential. These buildings, with their Georgian Karoo style and Victorian features, which date mainly from the nineteenth century, form an integral part of the historical and architectural core of Graaff-Reinet, which was founded in 1785.	Graaff-Reinet	Graaff-Reinet	Provincial Heritage Site	32°15′07″S 24°32′05″E	Upload Photo
9/2/033/0002-434	64 Donkin Street, Graaff-Reinet	3-bay saddle roofed house with 2 Karoo-type 3 bay extensions and along stoep. Saddle roof with shouldered and moulded end gables with chimneys and loft door. Extensions have Karoo-type stepped parapets with mouldings and heavy. Main door and windows ha Architectural style: Victorian or probably Victorianized Cape Dutch. Type of site: House Current use: Residential. These buildings, with their Georgian Karoo style and Victorian features, which date mainly from the nineteenth century, form an integral part of the historical and architectural core of Graaff-Reinet, which was founded in 1785.	Graaff-Reinet	Graaff-Reinet	Provincial Heritage Site	32°15′27″S 24°31′43″E	Upload Photo
9/2/033/0002-435	3 Milner Street, Graaff-Reinet	Large winged Victorian house with hipped roof and verandah. Free standing. Hipped roof. Gable wing is covered and has finial. Verandah with bullnose roof on precast pillars and straight walls with tiled top. Left part glazed. 5 panel door with plain Architectural style: Victorian. Type of site: House Current use: Residential. These buildings, with their Georgian Karoo style and Victorian features, which date mainly from the nineteenth century, form an integral part of the historical and architectural core of Graaff-Reinet, which was founded in 1785.	Graaff-Reinet	Graaff-Reinet	Provincial Heritage Site	32°15′02″S 24°31′57″E	Upload Photo
9/2/033/0002-436	69 Donkin Street, Graaff-Reinet	3 bay Karoo-type cottage with stepped parapet and verandah. Karoo-type roof with stepped parapet with facebrick edge. Verandah with hipped straight roof on precast square, fluted pillars and straight walls with tiled edge. Modern door. Modern steel win Architectural style: Karoo-type. Type of site: House Current use: Residential. These buildings, with their Georgian Karoo style and Victorian features, which date mainly from the nineteenth century, form an integral part of the historical and architectural core of Graaff-Reinet, which was founded in 1785.	Graaff-Reinet	Graaff-Reinet	Provincial Heritage Site	32°15′24″S 24°31′46″E	Upload Photo
9/2/033/0002-437	34 Plasket Street, Graaff-Reinet	5 bay Karoo-type house with stepped parapet and verandah. karoo-type roof with stepped parapet and moulded cornice. Verandah with straight roof on moulded masonry pillars on moulded, dipped walls. 3x 3 double door with large 20 pane fanlight. High win Architectural style: Karoo-type. Type of site: House Current use: Residential. These buildings, with their Georgian Karoo style and Victorian features, which date mainly from the nineteenth century, form an integral part of the historical and architectural core of Graaff-Reinet, which was founded in 1785.	Graaff-Reinet	Graaff-Reinet	Provincial Heritage Site	32°15′14″S 24°31′33″E	Upload Photo
9/2/033/0002-438	32 Plasket Street, Graaff-Reinet	3 bay house with moulded gable end and verandah. Free standing and set back. Low-pitch roof with mock chimney at apex of moulded pedimented end gable. Verandah with ogee roof on pipe supports. End walls. Single door with fanlight. 2 × 2 sashes. Woo Architectural style: Victorian/Edwardian. Type of site: House Current use: Residential. These buildings, with their Georgian Karoo style and Victorian features, which date mainly from the nineteenth century, form an integral part of the historical and architectural core of Graaff-Reinet, which was founded in 1785.	Graaff-Reinet	Graaff-Reinet	Provincial Heritage Site	32°15′13″S 24°31′32″E	Upload Photo
9/2/033/0002-439	11 Plasket Street, Graaff-Reinet	3 bay house with high-hipped roof and verandah. High hipped roof. walls has rustication. verandah with straight roof on masonry pillars and straight walls with tiled tops. Half-glazed double door with 2 pane fanlight. 2 × 2 sashes. Architectural style: Victorian/Edwardian. Type of site: House Current use: Residential. These buildings, with their Georgian Karoo style and Victorian features, which date mainly from the nineteenth century, form an integral part of the historical and architectural core of Graaff-Reinet, which was founded in 1785.	Graaff-Reinet	Graaff-Reinet	Provincial Heritage Site	32°15′12″S 24°31′35″E	Upload Photo
9/2/033/0002-440	79 Donkin Street, Graaff-Reinet	3 bay Karoo-type cottage with straight parapet and verandah. Free standing. Karoo-type roof with straight, moulded parapet. Verandah with straight roof on precast pillars and dipped, moulded walls. Modern door. Steel windows. Architectural style: Karoo-type. Type of site: House Current use: Residential. These buildings, with their Georgian Karoo style and Victorian features, which date mainly from the nineteenth century, form an integral part of the historical and architectural core of Graaff-Reinet, which was founded in 1785.	Graaff-Reinet	Graaff-Reinet	Provincial Heritage Site	32°15′27″S 24°31′48″E	Upload Photo
9/2/033/0002-441	76 Donkin Street, Graaff-Reinet	3 bay Karoo-type cottage with heavy parapet and verandah. Karoo-type roof with heavy parapet. Parapet continues as moulding on both sides of front wall. Verandah with hipped straight roof on pipes and facebrick walls. 3 × 3 panel double door with orna Architectural style: Karoo-type. Type of site: House Current use: Residential. These buildings, with their Georgian Karoo style and Victorian features, which date mainly from the nineteenth century, form an integral part of the historical and architectural core of Graaff-Reinet, which was founded in 1785.	Graaff-Reinet	Graaff-Reinet	Provincial Heritage Site	32°15′30″S 24°31′45″E	Upload Photo
9/2/033/0002-442	72 Donkin Street, Graaff-Reinet	Fine 3 bay Karoo-type cottage with 3 bay + garage extension and long stoep. Karoo-type roof with stepped parapet and heavy cornice. Main house has thick moulded door and window architraves. Long stoep. Karoo-type roof with stepped parapet and heavy cor Architectural style: Karoo-type. Type of site: House Current use: Residential. These buildings, with their Georgian Karoo style and Victorian features, which date mainly from the nineteenth century, form an integral part of the historical and architectural core of Graaff-Reinet, which was founded in 1785.	Graaff-Reinet	Graaff-Reinet	Provincial Heritage Site	32°15′29″S 24°31′43″E	Upload Photo
9/2/033/0002-443	124 Cradock Street, Graaff-Reinet	3 bay house with central covered gable and fine verandah. Abuts 126. Saddle roof with covered triangular front gable with fretwork, bargeboarding, finialand semi-circular vent. Wall has eyebrow mouldings and fluted pilasters at door. Verandah with hipp Type of site: House Current use: Residential. These buildings, with their Georgian Karoo style and Victorian characteristics and which date mainly from the nineteenth century, form an integral part of the historical and architectural core of Graaff-Reinet, which was founded in 1785.	Graaff-Reinet	Graaff-Reinet	Provincial Heritage Site	32°15′21″S 24°32′00″E	Upload Photo
9/2/033/0002-444	8 Parliament Street, Graaff-Reinet	Two 3 bay attached Karoo-type cottages with stoep. Karoo-type roof with straight moulded parapet. Wall has moulded architraves. Stoep with end wall. In 1982 verandah on no 8. New stable type doors with 6 pane fanlight. New 9 × 9 sashes with louvred Architectural style: Karoo-type. Type of site: House Current use: Residential. These buildings, with their Georgian Karoo style and Victorian features, which date mainly from the nineteenth century, form an integral part of the historical and architectural core of Graaff-Reinet, which was founded in 1785.	Graaff-Reinet	Graaff-Reinet	Provincial Heritage Site	32°15′07″S 24°32′06″E	Upload Photo
9/2/033/0002-464	128 Cradock Street, Graaff-Reinet	3 bay Karoo-type house with parapet and walled stoep. Arch to 126. Karoo-type roof with straight moulded parapet. Stoep with dwarf side and street walls. 4 × 4 panel double door with 3 pane fanlight. Sashes with louvred shutters. (closed). Architectural style: Karoo-type. Type of site: House Current use: Residential. These buildings, with their Georgian Karoo style and Victorian characteristics and which date mainly from the nineteenth century, form an integral part of the historical and architectural core of Graaff-Reinet, which was founded in 1785.	Graaff-Reinet	Graaff-Reinet	Provincial Heritage Site	32°15′17″S 24°31′57″E	Upload Photo
9/2/033/0002-519	61 Church Street, Graaff-Reinet	Small free-standing, 3 bay, Cape Dutch cottage. Thatched saddle roof with plain triangular front gable and shouldered end gables with mock chimneys and mouldings. Front wall has moulded door and window quoining imitating stonework. Stoep. 3 × 3 double Architectural style: Cape Dutch. These buildings, with their Georgian Karoo style and Victorian features, which date mainly from the nineteenth century, form an integral part of the historical and architectural core of Graaff-Reinet, which was founded in 1785.	Graaff-Reinet	Graaff-Reinet	Provincial Heritage Site	32°36′58″S 24°32′13″E	Upload Photo
9/2/033/0002-520	37 Cradock Street, Graaff-Reinet	3 Bay Karoo-type house with verandah with extension to right. Sloping and stepped parapet to right hand side. Flat roof with stepped parapet with facebrick edge. Wall fanitly russticated with raised smooth plaster surrounds to openings. Verandah with s Architectural style: Karoo-type. Type of site: House Current use: Residential. These buildings, with their Georgian Karoo style and Victorian characteristics and which date mainly from the nineteenth century, form an integral part of the historical and architectural core of Graaff-Reinet, which was founded in 1785.	Graaff-Reinet	Graaff-Reinet	Provincial Heritage Site	32°14′55″S 24°31′52″E	Upload Photo
9/2/033/0002-521	Camdeboo Cottages, 39–47 Bourke Street, Graaff-Reinet	Group of restored Karoo-type cottages in Bourke and Parliament Streets. Karoo-type with finely moulded broken pediment parapets and heavy cornices. Walls have corner mouldings and plain architraves at doors and windows. Stoeps. 4 panel doors with uppe Architectural style: Karoo-type. Current use: Self-catering tourist accommodation. These buildings, with their Georgian Karoo style and Victorian characteristics and which date mainly from the nineteenth century, form an integral part of the historical and architectural core of Graaff-Reinet, which was founded in 1785.	Graaff-Reinet	Graaff-Reinet	Provincial Heritage Site	32°15′10″S 24°32′04″E	Group of restored Karoo-type cottages in Bourke and Parliament Streets. Karoo-type with finely moulded broken pediment parapets and heavy cornices. Walls have corner mouldings and plain architraves at doors and windows. Stoeps. 4 panel doors with uppe Architectural style: Karoo-type. Current use: Self-catering tourist accommodation. These buildings, with their Georgian Karoo style and Victorian characteristics and which date mainly from the nineteenth century, form an integral part of the historical and architectural core of Graaff-Reinet, which was founded in 1785.
9/2/033/0002-522	9 Bourke Street, Graaff-Reinet	2-Unit long Victorian house with 2 front gables and a verandah. Saddle roof with 2 triangular, covered front gables with fretwork bargeboarding and arched vents. Verandah with hipped, concave roof with fretwork fringes, wooden posts and trellis railing Architectural style: Victorian. Type of site: House Current use: Residential. These buildings, with their Georgian Karoo style and Victorian characteristics and which date mainly from the nineteenth century, form an integral part of the historical and architectural core of Graaff-Reinet, which was founded in 1785.	Graaff-Reinet	Graaff-Reinet	Provincial Heritage Site	24°31′58″S 32°14′55″E	Upload Photo
9/2/033/0002-523	138B Cradock Street, Graaff-Reinet	3 + 2 bay Karoo-type cottage with straight parapet and stoep with end walls. Attached to 140. Karoo-type roof with straight, moulded parapet. Stoep with moulded end walls and seats. 2 panel stable door with 3 pane fanlight. 6 × 6 sashes with louvred Architectural style: Karoo-type. Type of site: House Current use: Residential. These buildings, with their Georgian Karoo style and Victorian characteristics and which date mainly from the nineteenth century, form an integral part of the historical and architectural core of Graaff-Reinet, which was founded in 1785.	Graaff-Reinet	Graaff-Reinet	Provincial Heritage Site	32°15′19″S 24°31′59″E	Upload Photo
9/2/033/0002-524	24–26 Park Street, Graaff-Reinet	2 Attached or abutting 3 bay cottages with stepped parapet and walled stoeps. Mono-pitch roof with stepped parapet and cornice. 24 Moulded. Walls have rustication and raised plaster surrounds. 2 Stoeps with dipped walls and a dividing higher wall betw Architectural style: Karoo-type. Type of site: House Current use: Residential (2 units). These buildings, with their Georgian Karoo style and Victorian characteristics and which date mainly from the nineteenth century, form an integral part of the historical and architectural core of Graaff-Reinet, which was founded in 1785.	Graaff-Reinet	Graaff-Reinet	Provincial Heritage Site	32°14′52″S 24°31′42″E	Upload Photo
9/2/033/0002-525	104 Church Street, Graaff-Reinet	Free standing 5 bay Cape Dutch type house withhol bol gables and front verandah. Saddle roof (originally thatched) with holbol end and central gables with modern vent. Bullnose verandah roof on precast pillars with modern wrought iron fence between. Ver This building with its Cape Dutch gables was the first church building of the Dutch Reformed congregation at Graaff-Reinet. It was erected in 1792. The rebuilding and alterations took place in 1945. Architectural style: Cape Dutch. Type of site: House Current use: Residential.	Graaff-Reinet	Graaff-Reinet	Provincial Heritage Site	32°15′22″S 24°32′12″E	Upload Photo
9/2/033/0002-526	93 Donkin Street, Graaff-Reinet	4 bay Karoo-type corner house with stepped parapetand moulded stoep. Abuts (or attached to) 91. Karoo-type roof with moulded stepped parapet and cornice. Stoep with dipped and moulded side and street walls. 4 panel (top ones arched) Edwardian type doo Architectural style: Karoo-type. Type of site: House Current use: Residential.	Graaff-Reinet	Graaff-Reinet	Provincial Heritage Site	32°15′33″S 24°31′49″E	Upload Photo
9/2/033/0002-527	89 Donkin Street, Graaff-Reinet	Fine 3 bay Karoo-type cottage with stepped parapet and fine verandah. Free-standing. Karoo-type roof with stepped parapet and heavy cornice. Wall is rusticated. Verandah with hipped ogee roof on square fluted pillars on fine dipped and moulded walls. Architectural style: Karoo-type. Type of site: House Current use: Residential. These buildings, with their Georgian Karoo style and Victorian features, which date mainly from the nineteenth century, form an integral part of the historical and architectural core of Graaff-Reinet, which was founded in 1785.	Graaff-Reinet	Graaff-Reinet	Provincial Heritage Site	32°15′31″S 24°31′50″E	Upload Photo
9/2/033/0002-528	47 Cradock Street, Graaff-Reinet	3 Bay Karoo-type cottage with stepped parapet and walled stoep. Attached to no. 49. Flat roof with stepped parapet and moulded cornice to front and stepped parapet to left hand side. Stoep with dipped walls with light strap coping. Concrete stoep. Mod Architectural style: Karoo-type. Type of site: House Current use: Residential. These buildings, with their Georgian Karoo style and Victorian characteristics and which date mainly from the nineteenth century, form an integral part of the historical and architectural core of Graaff-Reinet, which was founded in 1785.	Graaff-Reinet	Graaff-Reinet	Provincial Heritage Site	32°14′57″S 24°31′53″E	Upload Photo
9/2/033/0002-529	73 Somerset Street, Graaff-Reinet	Long 3 + 3 bay Karoo-type house with stepped parapet and fenced stoep. Karoo-type roof with stepped parapet and heavy cornice. Glazed double doors with small panes and small pane fanlights. 12 x 12 sashes with louvred shutters. Victorian fence and gate Architectural style: Karoo-type. Type of site: House Current use: Residential. These buildings, with their Georgian Karoo style and Victorian features, which date mainly from the nineteenth century, form an integral part of the historical and architectural core of Graaff-Reinet, which was founded in 1785.	Graaff-Reinet	Graaff-Reinet	Provincial Heritage Site	32°15′09″S 24°31′54″E	Upload Photo
9/2/033/0002-530	66 Bourke Street, Graaff-Reinet	3 bay Victorian house with verandah. Saddle roof with finials. Wall has rustication. Verandah with hipped ogee roof, fretwork fringe, square wooden posts and lattice work railing. 4 panel single door (Edwardian type) with plain fanlight. 2 × 2 sashes Architectural style: Victorian. Type of site: House Current use: Residential. These buildings, with their Georgian Karoo style and Victorian features, which date mainly from the nineteenth century, form an integral part of the historical and architectural core of Graaff-Reinet, which was founded in 1785.	Graaff-Reinet	Graaff-Reinet	Provincial Heritage Site	32°15′12″S 24°32′02″E	Upload Photo
9/2/033/0002-531	102 Bourke Street, Graaff-Reinet	Small, symmetrical Karoo cottage with stoep. Recently renovated. Karoo-type roof with straight parapet and fine cornice. Plastered walls with plain mouldings at corners and around door and windows. Stoep with end walls. 4 panel modern door with 2 pane Architectural style: Karoo-type. Type of site: House Current use: Residential, semi-detached. These buildings, with their Georgian Karoo style and Victorian features, which date mainly from the nineteenth century, form an integral part of the historical and architectural core of Graaff-Reinet, which was founded in 1785.	Graaff-Reinet	Graaff-Reinet	Provincial Heritage Site	32°15′24″S 24°32′07″E	Upload Photo
9/2/033/0002-532	104 Bourke Street, Graaff-Reinet	Small, symmetrical, semi-detached Karoo-type cottage. Recently renovated. Karoo-type roof with straight parapet and fine cornice. Plastered walls with plain mouldings at corners and around door and windows. Stoep with end walls. 4 panel modern door. Architectural style: Karoo-type. Type of site: House Current use: Residential. These buildings, with their Georgian Karoo style and Victorian features, which date mainly from the nineteenth century, form an integral part of the historical and architectural core of Graaff-Reinet, which was founded in 1785.	Graaff-Reinet	Graaff-Reinet	Provincial Heritage Site	32°15′24″S 24°32′07″E	Upload Photo
9/2/033/0002-533	100 Bourke Street, Graaff-Reinet	3-bay Karoo-type cottage with stoep and garage. Karoo-type roof with heavy moulding (cornice) on parapet. Walls plastered and with corner, door and window surrounds. Stoep with end walls. Edwardian type door with 4 panels and 2 pane fanlight. Modern Architectural style: Karoo-type. Type of site: House Current use: Residential. These buildings, with their Georgian Karoo style and Victorian features, which date mainly from the nineteenth century, form an integral part of the historical and architectural core of Graaff-Reinet, which was founded in 1785.	Graaff-Reinet	Graaff-Reinet	Provincial Heritage Site	32°15′24″S 24°32′07″E	Upload Photo
9/2/033/0002-534	13 Ryneveld Square, Graaff-Reinet	3 bay Karoo-type house with stepped parapet, side-walled stoep and garage extension to left. Flat roof with stepped parapet and moulded cornice and strap moulded upper edge. Side parapets stepped. Raised smooth plaster surrounds to door incorporating. Architectural style: Karoo-type. Type of site: House Current use: Residential.	Graaff-Reinet	Graaff-Reinet	Provincial Heritage Site	32°14′52″S 24°31′59″E	Upload Photo
9/2/033/0002-536	Hester Rupert Art Museum, 19 Church Street, Graaff-Reinet	Greek cross-plan church with Cape Dutch gables. Free-standing. Saddle roof with Cape Dutch holbol gables with mouldings and semi-circular vents. Gable facades have plaster pilasters. 3 × 3 panel double doors with small pane fanlight. High arched wind The Old Mission Church was built in 1821 by a local missionary Society, the Graaff-Reinetse Medewerkende Sendinggenootschap. No. 194 Dutch Reformed Mission Church (Hester Rupert Art Museum), Graaff-Reinet This graceful little Mission Church stands in Chu Architectural style: Cape Dutch. Current use: Gallery, Museum. The Old Mission Church was built in 1821 by a local missionary Society, the Graaff-Reinetse Medewerkende Sendinggenootschap.	Graaff-Reinet	Graaff-Reinet	Provincial Heritage Site	32°15′04″S 24°32′09″E	Greek cross-plan church with Cape Dutch gables. Free-standing. Saddle roof with Cape Dutch holbol gables with mouldings and semi-circular vents. Gable facades have plaster pilasters. 3 × 3 panel double doors with small pane fanlight. High arched wind The Old Mission Church was built in 1821 by a local missionary Society, the Graaff-Reinetse Medewerkende Sendinggenootschap. No. 194 Dutch Reformed Mission Church (Hester Rupert Art Museum), Graaff-Reinet This graceful little Mission Church stands in Chu Architectural style: Cape Dutch. Current use: Gallery, Museum. The Old Mission Church was built in 1821 by a local missionary Society, the Graaff-Reinetse Medewerkende Sendinggenootschap. Media related to Hester Rupert Art Museum at Wikimedia Commons
9/2/033/0002-537	76 Cradock Street, Graaff-Reinet	5 bay Karoo-type house with stepped parapet and verandah. Attached to 78. Karoo-type roof with stepped parapet with facebrick edge. Verandah with hipped ogee roof on fretwork supports and wrought iron fence and gate. Half high end walls. 6 × 6 sashes Architectural style: Karoo-type. Type of site: House Current use: Residential. These buildings, with their Georgian Karoo style and Victorian characteristics and which date mainly from the nineteenth century, form an integral part of the historical and architectural core of Graaff-Reinet, which was founded in 1785.	Graaff-Reinet	Graaff-Reinet	Provincial Heritage Site	32°15′06″S 24°31′53″E	Upload Photo
9/2/033/0002-538	119 Cradock Street, Graaff-Reinet	4 + 3 bay long Karoo-type house with pergola (117) and verandah (119). Karoo-type roof with straight parapet and plain mouldings. (117) Stoep with stoep wall and pergola (verandah roof replaced) on masonry pillars. (119) straight verandah roof on precast Architectural style: Karoo-type. Type of site: House Current use: Residential (2 units), (2 owners). These buildings, with their Georgian Karoo style and Victorian characteristics and which date mainly from the nineteenth century, form an integral part of the historical and architectural core of Graaff-Reinet, which was founded in 1785.	Graaff-Reinet	Graaff-Reinet	Provincial Heritage Site	32°15′21″S 24°32′00″E	Upload Photo
9/2/033/0002-539	117 Cradock Street, Graaff-Reinet	4 + 3 bay long Karoo-type house with pergola (117) and verandah (119). Karoo-type roof with straight parapet and plain mouldings. (117) Stoep with stoep wall and pergola (verandah roof replaced) on masonry pillars. (119) straight verandah roof on precast Architectural style: Karoo-type. Type of site: House Current use: Residential. These buildings, with their Georgian Karoo style and Victorian characteristics and which date mainly from the nineteenth century, form an integral part of the historical and architectural core of Graaff-Reinet, which was founded in 1785.	Graaff-Reinet	Graaff-Reinet	Provincial Heritage Site	32°15′06″S 24°31′53″E	Upload Photo
9/2/033/0002-540	109 Cradock Street, Graaff-Reinet	3 bay small cottage with walled stoep and garage extension. Karoo-type roof with straight edge-moulded parapet. Stoep with moulded, dipped side and street walls. 4 panel Edwardian type door with 2 pane fanlight. Wooden lintel. 2 × 2 sashes with louvre Architectural style: Karoo-type. Type of site: House Current use: Residential. These buildings, with their Georgian Karoo style and Victorian characteristics and which date mainly from the nineteenth century, form an integral part of the historical and architectural core of Graaff-Reinet, which was founded in 1785.	Graaff-Reinet	Graaff-Reinet	Provincial Heritage Site	32°15′06″S 24°31′53″E	Upload Photo
9/2/033/0002-541	107 Cradock Street, Graaff-Reinet	3 bay saddle roofed house with verandah with 1 bay extension on right. Saddle roof with covered end gables with finials. 2 triangular dormer vents with bargeboard and finial. Wall is rusticated. Verandah with hipped bullnose roof on precast pillars and Architectural style: Victorian. Type of site: House Current use: Residential. These buildings, with their Georgian Karoo style and Victorian characteristics and which date mainly from the nineteenth century, form an integral part of the historical and architectural core of Graaff-Reinet, which was founded in 1785.	Graaff-Reinet	Graaff-Reinet	Provincial Heritage Site	32°15′06″S 24°31′53″E	Upload Photo
9/2/033/0002-542	104 Cradock Street, Graaff-Reinet	L-shaped, free standing house with end gable and verandah. Hipped roof. left wing has Cape Dutch holbol moulded gable with vent. Verandah with straight roof on precast pillars and straight wall with tiled top. Half-glazed Edwardian type door with 2 pane Architectural style: Cape Dutch Revival. Type of site: House Current use: Residential. These buildings, with their Georgian Karoo style and Victorian characteristics and which date mainly from the nineteenth century, form an integral part of the historical and architectural core of Graaff-Reinet, which was founded in 1785.	Graaff-Reinet	Graaff-Reinet	Provincial Heritage Site	32°15′06″S 24°31′53″E	Upload Photo
9/2/033/0002-543	100 Cradock Street, Graaff-Reinet	Large and high Karoo-type house with stepped parapet and fine verandah with triangular gable. Karoo-type roof with parapet and heavy mouldings. Wall has rustication. Fine, fluted pilasters with pediment at door. Verandah with hipped bulnose roof with Architectural style: Karoo-type. Type of site: House Current use: Residential. These buildings, with their Georgian Karoo style and Victorian characteristics and which date mainly from the nineteenth century, form an integral part of the historical and architectural core of Graaff-Reinet, which was founded in 1785.	Graaff-Reinet	Graaff-Reinet	Provincial Heritage Site	32°15′06″S 24°31′53″E	Upload Photo
9/2/033/0002-544	96 Cradock Street, Graaff-Reinet	4 bay saddle-roofed house with stoep. Saddle roof with covered end gables with fretwork bargeboarding with finials and arched vent. Wall has rustication and plain moulded architraves. Stone stoep raised with end walls and seats. 3 × 3 panel double door Architectural style: Victorian, possibly Victorianized Cape Dutch. Type of site: House Current use: Residential. These buildings, with their Georgian Karoo style and Victorian characteristics and which date mainly from the nineteenth century, form an integral part of the historical and architectural core of Graaff-Reinet, which was founded in 1785.	Graaff-Reinet	Graaff-Reinet	Provincial Heritage Site	32°15′06″S 24°31′53″E	Upload Photo
9/2/033/0002-545	44 Cradock Street, Graaff-Reinet	3 Bay pitched roof corner house with stoep and street walls in both streets. Pitched roof with covered end gables with double loft door to left gable and attached matchboard door in right hand gable. Walls raised smooth plaster edge to right corner only Type of site: House Current use: Residential. These buildings, with their Georgian Karoo style and Victorian characteristics and which date mainly from the nineteenth century, form an integral part of the historical and architectural core of Graaff-Reinet, which was founded in 1785.	Graaff-Reinet	Graaff-Reinet	Provincial Heritage Site	32°14′53″S 24°31′48″E	Upload Photo
9/2/033/0002-546	80 Cradock Street, Graaff-Reinet	Saddle roofed 3 bay house with central gable, end gables and verandah. Victorian saddle roof with central, covered triangular gable with fretwork fringe and supports, railing and gates. 4 panel (upper ones arched) door with geometric fanlight. 2 × 2 sa Architectural style: Victorian. Type of site: House Current use: Residential. These buildings, with their Georgian Karoo style and Victorian characteristics and which date mainly from the nineteenth century, form an integral part of the historical and architectural core of Graaff-Reinet, which was founded in 1785.	Graaff-Reinet	Graaff-Reinet	Provincial Heritage Site	32°15′03″S 24°31′51″E	Upload Photo
9/2/033/0002-547	45 Cradock Street, Graaff-Reinet	3 Bay Karoo-type house with stepped parapet and stoep. Flat roof with stepped parapet and moulded cornice to front and stepped parapet to sides. Left hand side parapet with chimney. Rusticated wall with smooth raised plaster surrounds to openings and edg Architectural style: Karoo-type. Type of site: House Current use: Residential. These buildings, with their Georgian Karoo style and Victorian characteristics and which date mainly from the nineteenth century, form an integral part of the historical and architectural core of Graaff-Reinet, which was founded in 1785.	Graaff-Reinet	Graaff-Reinet	Provincial Heritage Site	32°14′57″S 24°31′52″E	Upload Photo
9/2/033/0002-548	75 Cradock Street, Graaff-Reinet	3 bay Karoo-type cottage with fine pedimented parapet and walled stoep. Karoo-type roof with broken, low pedimented parapet with fine mouldings. Stoep with straight side and front walls. 6 panel single door with 2 pane Edwardian type fanlight. Sashes Architectural style: Karoo-type. Type of site: House Current use: Residential. These buildings, with their Georgian Karoo style and Victorian characteristics and which date mainly from the nineteenth century, form an integral part of the historical and architectural core of Graaff-Reinet, which was founded in 1785.	Graaff-Reinet	Graaff-Reinet	Provincial Heritage Site	32°15′06″S 24°31′55″E	Upload Photo
9/2/033/0002-549	74 Cradock Street, Graaff-Reinet	3 Bay high cottage with stepped parapet with facebrick edge. Wall with rustication and heavy plain architraves and eyebrow mouldings. Door pilasters and head. Verandah on both streets with hipped bullnose roof on rusticated pillars on dipped walls with Architectural style: Karoo-type. Type of site: House Current use: Residential. These buildings, with their Georgian Karoo style and Victorian characteristics and which date mainly from the nineteenth century, form an integral part of the historical and architectural core of Graaff-Reinet, which was founded in 1785.	Graaff-Reinet	Graaff-Reinet	Provincial Heritage Site	32°15′01″S 24°31′51″E	Upload Photo
9/2/033/0002-550	2 Parsonage Street, Graaff-Reinet	3 + 3 bay saddle roofed house with pedimented end gables. The roof is a very low-pitch saddle roof between shouldered and pedimented end gables with fine mouldings. Walls in both streets are rusticated and have moulded door and window architraves. Ston Architectural style: Karoo-type. Type of site: House Current use: Residential (and office?). These buildings, with their Georgian Karoo style and Victorian characteristics and which date mainly from the nineteenth century, form an integral part of the historical and architectural core of Graaff-Reinet, which was founded in 1785.	Graaff-Reinet	Graaff-Reinet	Provincial Heritage Site	32°15′04″S 24°32′18″E	3 + 3 bay saddle roofed house with pedimented end gables. The roof is a very low-pitch saddle roof between shouldered and pedimented end gables with fine mouldings. Walls in both streets are rusticated and have moulded door and window architraves. Ston Architectural style: Karoo-type. Type of site: House Current use: Residential (and office?). These buildings, with their Georgian Karoo style and Victorian characteristics and which date mainly from the nineteenth century, form an integral part of the historical and architectural core of Graaff-Reinet, which was founded in 1785.
9/2/033/0002-551	65 and 65A Cradock Street, Graaff-Reinet	Long, saddle roofed 4 bay house with verandah and 2 bay Karoo-type extension to the right. Low pitch saddle roof with finials. Verandah with hipped ogee roof on precast pillars and dipped walls. Extension has stoep with walls. 4 panel (upper ones arched Type of site: House Current use: Residential. These buildings, with their Georgian Karoo style and Victorian characteristics and which date mainly from the nineteenth century, form an integral part of the historical and architectural core of Graaff-Reinet, which was founded in 1785.	Graaff-Reinet	Graaff-Reinet	Provincial Heritage Site	32°15′04″S 24°31′54″E	Upload Photo
9/2/033/0002-552	58 Cradock Street, Graaff-Reinet	3 Bay Karoo-type house with garage to the left. Flat roof with steeped parapet and stepped side parapet to right and dipped to left and moulded cornice. Rusticated wall with smooth raised plaster surrounds to openings. Stoep with edges and below corni Architectural style: Karoo-type. Type of site: House Current use: Residential. These buildings, with their Georgian Karoo style and Victorian characteristics and which date mainly from the nineteenth century, form an integral part of the historical and architectural core of Graaff-Reinet, which was founded in 1785.	Graaff-Reinet	Graaff-Reinet	Provincial Heritage Site	32°15′06″S 24°31′53″E	Upload Photo
9/2/033/0002-553	48 Cradock Street, Graaff-Reinet	3 bay Karoo-type house with verandah and extension to left. Flat roof with stepped parapet with moulded cornice and strap to top edge of parapet. Sloping slide parapets. Mouldings openings have hood (narrower than present windows). Verandah with hippe Architectural style: Karoo-type. Type of site: House Current use: Residential. These buildings, with their Georgian Karoo style and Victorian characteristics and which date mainly from the nineteenth century, form an integral part of the historical and architectural core of Graaff-Reinet, which was founded in 1785.	Graaff-Reinet	Graaff-Reinet	Provincial Heritage Site	32°14′53″S 24°31′48″E	Upload Photo
9/2/033/0002-554	Old Powder Magazine, Graaff-Reinet	This Magazine which dates back to the end of the first half of the nineteenth century was erected on free- hold land which was granted to John Biddulph in 1834. Type of site: Powder Magazine.	Graaff-Reinet	Graaff-Reinet	Provincial Heritage Site	32°14′42″S 24°32′08″E	This Magazine which dates back to the end of the first half of the nineteenth century was erected on free- hold land which was granted to John Biddulph in 1834. Type of site: Powder Magazine. Media related to Powder Magazine, Graaff-Reinet at Wikimedia Commons
9/2/033/0002-555	92 Cradock Street, Graaff-Reinet	3 bay Victorian house with fine central gable and verandah. High-pitch saddle roof with covered end gables and central triangular gable with round vents fine bargeboarding, finial and plaster decor. Wall has rustication and quoins around doors and corne Architectural style: Late Victorian. Type of site: House Current use: Residential. These buildings, with their Georgian Karoo style and Victorian characteristics and which date mainly from the nineteenth century, form an integral part of the historical and architectural core of Graaff-Reinet, which was founded in 1785.	Graaff-Reinet	Graaff-Reinet	Provincial Heritage Site	32°15′06″S 24°31′53″E	Upload Photo
9/2/033/0002-557	164 Cradock Street, Graaff-Reinet	3 bay Karoo-type house with pedimented parapet and verandah. Abuts 166 to the right. Karoo-type roof with finely moulded pedimented parapet. Wall has rustication and quoins around door. Verandah with bullnose roof on precast pillars on straight wall wi Architectural style: Karoo-type. Type of site: House Current use: Residential. These buildings, with their Georgian Karoo style and Victorian characteristics and which date mainly from the nineteenth century, form an integral part of the historical, and architectural core of Graaff-Reinet, which was founded in 1785.	Graaff-Reinet	Graaff-Reinet	Provincial Heritage Site	32°15′26″S 24°32′00″E	Upload Photo
9/2/033/0002-558	162 Cradock Street, Graaff-Reinet	Long 4 bay Karoo-type house with pedimented parapet and stoep with end walls. Karoo-type roof with parapet with 3 finely moulded low pediments and heavy cornice. Wall with eyebrow mouldings and plain edge mouldings. Stoep with moulded end walls and se Architectural style: Karoo-type. Type of site: House Current use: Residential. These buildings, with their Georgian Karoo style and Victorian characteristics and which date mainly from the nineteenth century, form an integral part of the historical, and architectural core of Graaff-Reinet, which was founded in 1785.	Graaff-Reinet	Graaff-Reinet	Provincial Heritage Site	32°15′26″S 24°32′00″E	Upload Photo
9/2/033/0002-559	83 Cradock Street, Graaff-Reinet	Two 3 bay Karoo-type attached cottages with verandah. Karoo-type roof with stepped parapet and heavy cornice. Stone walls with raised joints. Fine deep-fluted pilasters at doors. Verandah with straight roof on precast pillars on straight walls with ti Architectural style: Karoo-type. Type of site: House Current use: Residential. These buildings, with their Georgian Karoo style and Victorian characteristics and which date mainly from the nineteenth century, form an integral part of the historical, and architectural core of Graaff-Reinet, which was founded in 1785.	Graaff-Reinet	Graaff-Reinet	Provincial Heritage Site	32°15′10″S 24°31′57″E	Upload Photo
9/2/033/0002-563	75–77 Donkin Street, Graaff-Reinet	Long 4 bay Victorian house (77) with pergola and 4 bay Karoo-type extension (75) with walled stoep on left. Saddle roof with finials and loft vent (77). Karoo-type roof with straight moulded parapet (65). One continuous rusticated wall. Stoep with mas? Architectural style: Victorian (77) with Karoo-type extension (75). Type of site: House Current use: Residential (2 units). These buildings, with their Georgian Karoo style and Victorian features, which date mainly from the nineteenth century, form an integral part of the historical and architectural core of Graaff-Reinet, which was founded in 1785.	Graaff-Reinet	Graaff-Reinet	Provincial Heritage Site	32°15′26″S 24°31′47″E	Upload Photo
9/2/033/0002-565	85 Cradock Street, Graaff-Reinet	Two 3 bay Karoo-type attached cottages with verandah. Karoo-type roof with stepped parapet and heavy cornice. Stone walls with raised joints. Fine deep-fluted pilasters at doors. Verandah with straight roof on precast pillars on straight walls with ti Architectural style: Karoo-type. Type of site: House Current use: Residential (2 units). These buildings, with their Georgian Karoo style and Victorian characteristics and which date mainly from the nineteenth century, form an integral part of the historical, and architectural core of Graaff-Reinet, which was founded in 1785.	Graaff-Reinet	Graaff-Reinet	Provincial Heritage Site	32°15′11″S 24°31′57″E	Upload Photo
9/2/033/0002-575	Reinet House, Murray Street, Graaff-Reinet	7 bays H-shaped Cape Dutch style building with pedimented gable. Gables have sash windows. Stoep rests on arches and has wrought iron railing and corner plinths. 2 × 2 arched double door with small panes fanlight. 30 x 30 and 20 x 20 pane sashes with The eastern boundary areas were proclaimed as a new district in 1785 and called Graaff-Reinet in honour of the Governor, Jacob van de Graaff and his wife Reinet. The administrative centre was established in a curve of the Sundays River at the foot of Span Architectural style: Cape Dutch. Current use: Museum.	Graaff-Reinet	Graaff-Reinet	Provincial Heritage Site	32°15′04″S 24°32′20″E	7 bays H-shaped Cape Dutch style building with pedimented gable. Gables have sash windows. Stoep rests on arches and has wrought iron railing and corner plinths. 2 × 2 arched double door with small panes fanlight. 30 x 30 and 20 x 20 pane sashes with The eastern boundary areas were proclaimed as a new district in 1785 and called Graaff-Reinet in honour of the Governor, Jacob van de Graaff and his wife Reinet. The administrative centre was established in a curve of the Sundays River at the foot of Span Architectural style: Cape Dutch. Current use: Museum. Media related to Reinet House at Wikimedia Commons
9/2/033/0002-576	10 Parsonage Street, Graaff-Reinet	3 bay Karoo-type cottage with stepped parapet, heavy cornice and walled stoep. Karoo-type roof with stepped parapet and heavy cornice continuing to no 8. Heavy architraves. Brick stoep with moulded and dipped walls. Steps to street. 4 panel door with Architectural style: Karoo-type. Type of site: House Current use: Residential. These Georgian buildings date from the first quarter of the nineteenth century and are excellent examples of the Karoo style of building.	Graaff-Reinet	Graaff-Reinet	Provincial Heritage Site	32°15′05″S 24°32′16″E	Upload Photo
9/2/033/0002-577	Graaff-Reinet Pharmacy, 24 Caledon Street, Graaff-Reinet	Double storey, 3 bay long building with a low-pitch saddle roof and a shop front. Low-pitch saddle roof. Plastered stone in lower floor, brick in upper floor. Street wall rusticated with corner quoins, mouldings and architraves. Stoep and steps to sho This double-storeyed building, which was presumably erected in about 1870, was adapted in 1900 as a pharmacy. This mid-Victorian pharmacy and its valuable antiques are of exceptional cultural-historic importance. Architectural style: Georgian. Type of site: Dispensary Current use: Pharmacy and warehouse (earlier bottling plant).	Graaff-Reinet	Graaff-Reinet	Provincial Heritage Site	32°14′54″S 24°32′09″E	Double storey, 3 bay long building with a low-pitch saddle roof and a shop front. Low-pitch saddle roof. Plastered stone in lower floor, brick in upper floor. Street wall rusticated with corner quoins, mouldings and architraves. Stoep and steps to sho This double-storeyed building, which was presumably erected in about 1870, was adapted in 1900 as a pharmacy. This mid-Victorian pharmacy and its valuable antiques are of exceptional cultural-historic importance. Architectural style: Georgian. Type of site: Dispensary Current use: Pharmacy and warehouse (earlier bottling plant).
9/2/033/0002-578	58 Bourke Street, Graaff-Reinet	Free-standing, set-back house with stoep in front and pergola at back. Low-pitch saddle roof with bargeboarding and finials over broad gable with arched, louvred vent. Walls have eyebrow mouldings over door and windows. Stoep at front, with pergola at Architectural style: Probably Victorianized Georgian house. Type of site: House Current use: Residential. These buildings, with their Georgian Karoo style and Victorian characteristics and which date mainly from the nineteenth century, form an integral part of the historical and architectural core of Graaff-Reinet, which was founded in 1785.	Graaff-Reinet	Graaff-Reinet	Provincial Heritage Site	32°15′09″S 24°32′01″E	Upload Photo
9/2/033/0002-579	1 Te Water Street, Graaff-Reinet	Small 3 bay Karoo-type cottage with pedimented parapet. Karoo-type roof with finely moulded broken pedimented parapetand cornice. No stoep. 3 × 3 double door with ornamental fanlight. Sashes with sliding louvred shutters. Architectural style: Karoo-type. Type of site: House Current use: Residential. These buildings, with their Georgian Karoo style and Victorian characteristics and which date mainly from the nineteenth century, form an integral part of the historical and architectural core of Graaff-Reinet, which was founded in 1785.	Graaff-Reinet	Graaff-Reinet	Provincial Heritage Site	32°15′00″S 24°32′10″E	Upload Photo
9/2/033/0002-580	65 Stockenstroom Street, Graaff-Reinet	2 Bay Karoo-type cottage with stepped parapet and verandah. Flat roof with stepped parapet and cornice. Wall has rustication. Verandah with ogee roof on precast, fluted, pillars on dipped walls with strap coping and diamond motif set in wall. Iron gate. Architectural style: Karoo-type. Type of site: House Current use: Residential. These buildings, with their Georgian Karoo style and Victorian characteristics and which date mainly from the nineteenth century, form an integral part of the historical and architectural core of Graaff-Reinet, which was founded in 1785.	Graaff-Reinet	Graaff-Reinet	Provincial Heritage Site	32°15′01″S 24°31′45″E	Upload Photo
9/2/033/0002-581	63 Stockenstroom Street, Graaff-Reinet	3 bay Karoo-type house with stepped parapet with moulded cornice, verandah and garage extension. Flat roof with stepped parapet and moulded cornice, with overhanging eaves to sides. Walls has rustication and corner quoins. Verandah with hipped roof on Architectural style: Karoo-type. Type of site: House Current use: Residential. These buildings, with their Georgian Karoo style and Victorian characteristics and which date mainly from the nineteenth century, form an integral part of the historical and architectural core of Graaff-Reinet, which was founded in 1785.	Graaff-Reinet	Graaff-Reinet	Provincial Heritage Site	32°15′00″S 24°31′45″E	Upload Photo
9/2/033/0002-582	166 Cradock Street, Graaff-Reinet	4 bay Karoo-type house with low pedimented parapet and stoep with end walls and seats. Karoo-type roof with broken pedimented parapet with simple edge mouldings. Wall has shallow moulded architraves. Stoep hasend walls with seats. 4 panel (top ones arc Architectural style: Karoo-type. Type of site: House Current use: Residential. These buildings, with their Georgian Karoo style and Victorian characteristics and which date mainly from the nineteenth century, form an integral part of the historical, and architectural core of Graaff-Reinet, which was founded in 1785.	Graaff-Reinet	Graaff-Reinet	Provincial Heritage Site	32°15′27″S 24°32′00″E	Upload Photo
9/2/033/0002-583	Old Congregational Church Parsonage, 21 Parsonage Street, Graaff-Reinet	3 bay H-shaped Cape Dutch house with holbol front gable and stoep. Thatched saddle roofs with central pedimented holbol gable and shouldered triangular end gables with mock chimneys. Brick stoep with end walls and seats. 4 × 4 panel double door with 24 Architectural style: Cape Dutch. Type of site: House Current use: Residential.	Graaff-Reinet	Graaff-Reinet	Provincial Heritage Site	32°15′07″S 24°32′13″E	Upload Photo
9/2/033/0002-584	84 Cradock Street, Graaff-Reinet	Double-winged Victorian house with end gables and verandah between wings. High-pitched saddle roof with covered end gables with finials and cross-shaped vents.Verandah with ogee roof on square pillars and straight walls. 4 panel slightly arched door wit Architectural style: Victorian. Type of site: House Current use: Residential. These buildings, with their Georgian Karoo style and Victorian characteristics and which date mainly from the nineteenth century, form an integral part of the historical, and architectural core of Graaff-Reinet, which was founded in 1785.	Graaff-Reinet	Graaff-Reinet	Provincial Heritage Site	32°15′04″S 24°31′52″E	Upload Photo
9/2/033/0002-586	88 Caledon Street, Graaff-Reinet	3-bay Karoo house with stepped parapet and stoep with wall. Roof with stepped parapet and moulded cornice. Flat – straight sloping parapet to side. Raised smooth plaster surrounds to openings and edges. Stoep with dipped wall with tiled coping. New 6 Architectural style: Karoo-type. Type of site: House Current use: Residential. These buildings, with their Georgian Karoo style and Victorian characteristics and which date mainly from the nineteenth century, form an integral part of the historical, and architectural core of Graaff-Reinet, which was founded in 1785.	Graaff-Reinet	Graaff-Reinet	Provincial Heritage Site	32°15′00″S 24°31′50″E	Upload Photo
9/2/033/0002-587	87 Caledon Street, Graaff-Reinet	A symmetrical 3 bay Karoo cottage with verandah. Abutting no. 89. Karoo-type roof with straight parapet and heavy cornice. Verandah with straight verandah roof on precast pillars and dipped walls. 2 × 2 panel (upper ones arched) double door with 2 pa Architectural style: Karoo-type. Type of site: House Current use: Residential. These buildings, with their Georgian Karoo style and Victorian characteristics and which date mainly from the nineteenth century, form an integral part of the historical, and architectural core of Graaff-Reinet, which was founded in 1785.	Graaff-Reinet	Graaff-Reinet	Provincial Heritage Site	32°15′03″S 24°31′47″E	Upload Photo
9/2/033/0002-588	86 Caledon Street, Graaff-Reinet	3 Bay Karoo cottage with stoep and walls. Flat roof with small stepped parapet with strap mould top. Straight sloping parapets to sides. Raised smooth plaster surrounds to openings. Concrete stoep, dipped walls with painted tile coping. 3 × 3 panel d Architectural style: Karoo-type. Type of site: House Current use: Residential. These buildings, with their Georgian Karoo style and Victorian characteristics and which date mainly from the nineteenth century, form an integral part of the historical, and architectural core of Graaff-Reinet, which was founded in 1785.	Graaff-Reinet	Graaff-Reinet	Provincial Heritage Site	32°15′00″S 24°31′50″E	Upload Photo
9/2/033/0002-589	83–85 Caledon Street, Graaff-Reinet	A long 2-unit with saddle roof and verandah. Low-pitch saddle roof. Verandah with bullnose roof on precast pillars on straight facebrick walls. Modern glazed doors. Modern long steel windows. Type of site: House Current use: Residential. These buildings, with their Georgian Karoo style and Victorian characteristics and which date mainly from the nineteenth century, form an integral part of the historical, and architectural core of Graaff-Reinet, which was founded in 1785.	Graaff-Reinet	Graaff-Reinet	Provincial Heritage Site	32°15′03″S 24°31′47″E	Upload Photo
9/2/033/0002-590	86 Cradock Street, Graaff-Reinet	3 Bay saddle roof cottage with end gables, extension and verandah. Possibly originally thatched saddle roof with triangular end gables. Extension has Karoo-type roof with moulded, pedimented parapet. Wall has rustication and eyebrow mouldings. Facebri Type of site: House Current use: Residential. These buildings, with their Georgian Karoo style and Victorian characteristics and which date mainly from the nineteenth century, form an integral part of the historical, and architectural core of Graaff-Reinet, which was founded in 1785.	Graaff-Reinet	Graaff-Reinet	Provincial Heritage Site	32°15′05″S 24°31′52″E	Upload Photo
9/2/033/0002-592	62 Stockenstroom Street, Graaff-Reinet	3 bay Karoo-type house with pedimented parapet, verandah and garage extension. Karoo-type roof with moulded, broken pedimented parapet. Wall with corner mouldings. Facebrick foundation. Verandah with straight roof on precast, square and rusticated pil Architectural style: Karoo-type. Type of site: House Current use: Residential.	Graaff-Reinet	Graaff-Reinet	Provincial Heritage Site	32°15′06″S 24°31′45″E	Upload Photo
9/2/033/0004	Urquhart House, Somerset Street, Graaff-Reinet	5 bay large saddle-roofed house with covered front and end gables and long verandah. Saddle roof with covered front gable with bargeboarding and semicircular loft window. Walls are rusticated and have eyebrow mouldings. Verandah with hipped ogee roof o Architectural style: Victorianized Cape Dutch style. Type of site: House Current use: Residential.	Graaff-Reinet	Graaff-Reinet	Provincial Heritage Site	32°15′01″S 24°32′18″E	5 bay large saddle-roofed house with covered front and end gables and long verandah. Saddle roof with covered front gable with bargeboarding and semicircular loft window. Walls are rusticated and have eyebrow mouldings. Verandah with hipped ogee roof o Architectural style: Victorianized Cape Dutch style. Type of site: House Current use: Residential.
9/2/033/0005	Dewdney House, 38 Caledon Street, Graaff-Reinet	Double-storey 5 bay (C.St.) building, 2 bay in Church Square with stoep in both streets. Karoo-type roof with straight parapets and heavy cornice. Plastered walls with corner pilasters. Stoep on both sides. 4 × 4 panel double door with fine geometric Architectural style: Cape Dutch. Type of site: Commercial Current use: Commercial.	Graaff-Reinet	Graaff-Reinet	Provincial Heritage Site	32°14′55″S 24°32′07″E	Double-storey 5 bay (C.St.) building, 2 bay in Church Square with stoep in both streets. Karoo-type roof with straight parapets and heavy cornice. Plastered walls with corner pilasters. Stoep on both sides. 4 × 4 panel double door with fine geometric Architectural style: Cape Dutch. Type of site: Commercial Current use: Commercial.
9/2/033/0006	Old Residency, 1 Parsonage Street, Graaff-Reinet	4 bay Cape Dutch H-shaped corner building with thatched roofs and fine gables. Thatched saddle roofs with finely moulded and pedimented front gable with high shoulders and pilasters. Holbol end gables with top segment. Rusticated walls with moulded doo The Residency is a well preserved model of the early 19th Century H-planned gable house which, together with the impressive Reinet House, form a unique architectural group at the end of Parsonage Street. The Residency or official house of the Landdr Architectural style: Cape Dutch. Type of site: Residency Current use: Museum. The Residency is a well preserved model of the early 19th Century H-planned gable house which, together with the impressive Reinet House, form a unique architectural group at the end of Parsonage Street.	Graaff-Reinet	Graaff-Reinet	Provincial Heritage Site	32°15′05″S 24°32′18″E	4 bay Cape Dutch H-shaped corner building with thatched roofs and fine gables. Thatched saddle roofs with finely moulded and pedimented front gable with high shoulders and pilasters. Holbol end gables with top segment. Rusticated walls with moulded doo The Residency is a well preserved model of the early 19th Century H-planned gable house which, together with the impressive Reinet House, form a unique architectural group at the end of Parsonage Street. The Residency or official house of the Landdr Architectural style: Cape Dutch. Type of site: Residency Current use: Museum. The Residency is a well preserved model of the early 19th Century H-planned gable house which, together with the impressive Reinet House, form a unique architectural group at the end of Parsonage Street. Media related to Old Residency, Graaff-Reinet at Wikimedia Commons
9/2/033/0008	49 Murray Street, Graaff-Reinet	3 bay Karoo-type cottage with straight parapet and stoep with end walls. Karoo-type roof with straight moulded parapet. Wall is rusticated. Raised stoep with end walls and seats. 4 panel (top ones arched) Edwardian type door with plain fanlight. 2 x Architectural style: Karoo-type. Current use: Nursery office.	Graaff-Reinet	Graaff-Reinet	Provincial Heritage Site	32°15′15″S 24°32′26″E	3 bay Karoo-type cottage with straight parapet and stoep with end walls. Karoo-type roof with straight moulded parapet. Wall is rusticated. Raised stoep with end walls and seats. 4 panel (top ones arched) Edwardian type door with plain fanlight. 2 x Architectural style: Karoo-type. Current use: Nursery office. Media related to 49 Murray Street, Graaff-Reinet at Wikimedia Commons
9/2/033/0009	Rietvlei, Graaff-Reinet District		Graaff-Reinet	Graaff-Reinet	Provincial Heritage Site	32°15′06″S 24°32′46″E	Upload Photo
9/2/033/0010	Graaff-Reinet Club, 3 Church Street, Graaff-Reinet	Long 7 bay Karoo-type building set back in garden. It has two wings which are bay-shaped with splayed corners. The high parapets are heavily moulded. Walls are rusticated. Verandah along the whole front with concave roof, ornamental fretwork and woode Architectural style: Karoo type? Georgian Style. Type of site: Club Current use: Club.	Graaff-Reinet	Graaff-Reinet	Provincial Heritage Site	32°14′58″S 24°32′09″E	Long 7 bay Karoo-type building set back in garden. It has two wings which are bay-shaped with splayed corners. The high parapets are heavily moulded. Walls are rusticated. Verandah along the whole front with concave roof, ornamental fretwork and woode Architectural style: Karoo type? Georgian Style. Type of site: Club Current use: Club.
9/2/033/0013	Gaol, Middle Street, Graaff-Reinet	Karoo-type long building with 3 bay in centre and 4 bays on each side. Karoo-type roof with heavy, moulded cornice. Central part has stepped, pedimented parapet. Walls are rusticated with heavy quoins. Double door with fanlight. 6 × 6 sashes. This historic gaol was built between 1859 and 1861. During the Anglo-Boer War various rebels and Boer soldiers, including Commandant Gideon Scheepers and General Kritzinger, were held here. Architectural style: Georgian. Type of site: Gaol Current use: Prison. This historic gaol was built between 1859 and 1861. During the Anglo-Boer War various rebels and Boer soldiers, including Commandant Gideon Scheepers and General Kritzinger, were held here.	Graaff-Reinet	Graaff-Reinet	Provincial Heritage Site	32°15′10″S 24°32′28″E	Upload Photo
9/2/033/0014	136 Cradock Street, Graaff-Reinet	T-shaped 4 bay house with high walls and high-pitch saddle roof. High-pitch saddle roof with covered gables. Modern door with 2 pane fanlight. Big steel windows. Old outbuildings around corner in Middle Street with heavy parapets and small windows wit Architectural style: Modernized Cape Dutch?. Type of site: House Current use: Residential. These buildings, with their Georgian Karoo style and Victorian characteristics and which date mainly from the nineteenth century, form an integral part of the historical and architectural core of Graaff-Reinet, which was founded in 1785.	Graaff-Reinet	Graaff-Reinet	Provincial Heritage Site	32°15′19″S 24°31′58″E	Upload Photo
9/2/033/0015	Vrederus, 55 Somerset Street, Graaff-Reinet	Large saddle-roofed house with covered front gable and verandah on two sides. High pitch saddle roof with covered end and central gables with finials and narrow, arched vent. Walls have fine eyebrow mouldings. Verandah on two sides with hipped ogee roo Architectural style: Victorian Cape Dutch. Type of site: House Current use: Residential. These buildings, with their Georgian Karoo style and Victorian characteristics and which date mainly from the nineteenth century, form an integral part of the historical and architectural core of Graarf-Reinet, which was founded in 1785.	Graaff-Reinet	Graaff-Reinet	Provincial Heritage Site	32°15′06″S 24°32′04″E	Upload Photo
9/2/033/0016	St James Church, 35 Somerset Street, Graaff-Reinet	A small stone church with buttresses and narrow, arched windows with small stained glass panes. Saddle roof with corrugated iron. Stone wall has plastered and moulded window reveals. Narrow, arched windows with small panes with stained glass. Architectural style: Neo-Gothic designed by Sophia Gray. Type of site: Church Current use: Church.	Graaff-Reinet	Graaff-Reinet	Provincial Heritage Site	32°15′03″S 24°32′13″E	Upload Photo
9/2/033/0018	SA Police Academy, College Road, Graaff-Reinet		Graaff-Reinet	Graaff-Reinet	Provincial Heritage Site	32°15′40″S 24°32′19″E	Media related to South African Police Academy, Graaff-Reinet at Wikimedia Commons
9/2/033/0019	16 Parliament Street, Graaff-Reinet	3 bay saddle roofed cottage. Free-standing. Saddle roof between shouldered and moulded triangular end gables with mock chimneys. Walls have moulded architraves and corner mouldings. Stoep. 4 panel (upper ones arched) door with 2 pane fanlight. 2x2 sa Architectural style: Cape Dutch and Karoo-type. Current use: Self-catering tourist accommodation. These buildings, with their Georgian Karoo style and Victorian features, which date mainly from the nineteenth century, form an integral part of the historical and architectural core of Graaff-Reinet, which was founded in 1785.	Graaff-Reinet	Graaff-Reinet	Provincial Heritage Site	32°15′08″S 24°32′03″E	Upload Photo
9/2/033/0020	18 Parliament Street, Graaff-Reinet	3 bay Karoo-type cottage with stoeps. Free-standing. Karoo-type roof with straight, moulded parapet. Walls have moulded architraves and corner mouldings. Stoep. 4 panel (upper ones arched) door with geometric fanlight. 2x2 sashes with louvred shutter Architectural style: Cape Dutch and Karoo-type. Current use: Self-catering tourist accommodation. These buildings, with their Georgian Karoo style and Victorian features, which date mainly from the nineteenth century, form an integral part of the historical and architectural core of Graaff-Reinet, which was founded in 1785.	Graaff-Reinet	Graaff-Reinet	Provincial Heritage Site	32°15′07″S 24°32′05″E	Upload Photo
9/2/033/0021	3 Te Water Street, Graaff-Reinet	3 bay high-walled and saddle-roofed house with garage (coach house) extension. High-pitch saddle roof with finials and loft door in end gable. Wall rusticated and with plain moulded door and window architraves. No stoep. 3 × 3 panel double door with o Architectural style: Victorian or Victorianized Cape Dutch. Type of site: House Current use: Residential. These buildings, with their Georgian Karoo style and Victorian characteristics and which date mainly from the nineteenth century, form an integral part of the historical and architectural core of Graaff-Reinet, which was founded in 1785.	Graaff-Reinet	Graaff-Reinet	Provincial Heritage Site	33°15′00″S 24°32′10″E	Upload Photo
9/2/033/0023	Town Hall, Church Square, Graaff-Reinet	Double storey Town Hall in Flemish Revival Style with main access from Monument Square. Bust of Queen Victoria in centre. Tiled saddle roofs with main Neo-Classical end gable towards park. Central bell tower on top of roof and turreted vents. High fou? Architectural style: Renaissance & Edwardian Style. Architects: FW & F Hesse of Cape Town. Type of site: Town Hall Current use: Municipal Offices. (Public building).	Graaff-Reinet	Graaff-Reinet	Provincial Heritage Site	32°14′54″S 24°32′04″E	Double storey Town Hall in Flemish Revival Style with main access from Monument Square. Bust of Queen Victoria in centre. Tiled saddle roofs with main Neo-Classical end gable towards park. Central bell tower on top of roof and turreted vents. High fou? Architectural style: Renaissance & Edwardian Style. Architects: FW & F Hesse of Cape Town. Type of site: Town Hall Current use: Municipal Offices. (Public building). Media related to Graaff-Reinet Town Hall at Wikimedia Commons
9/2/033/0024	Valley of Desolation, Graaff-Reinet District	Soon after one leaves Graaff-Reinet a road turns sharply to the left from the main road to Middelburg. It passes between the mountain and the Van Rhyneveld Pass Dam and goes in a north-westerly direction to Murraysburg and Richmond. Opposite the dam another.	Graaff-Reinet	Graaff-Reinet	Provincial Heritage Site	32°16′03″S 24°29′35″E	Soon after one leaves Graaff-Reinet a road turns sharply to the left from the main road to Middelburg. It passes between the mountain and the Van Rhyneveld Pass Dam and goes in a north-westerly direction to Murraysburg and Richmond. Opposite the dam another. Media related to Valley of desolation at Wikimedia Commons
9/2/033/0025	Te Water House, 32 Somerset Street, Graaff-Reinet	Large H-shaped house with covered end and central gables. Verandahs on both street sides. Saddle roofs with covered gables with bargeboarding; arched vents and finials. The gables are moulded. Wall has pilasters on both sides of door with relieving an Architectural style: Victorianized Cape Dutch. Current use: Shops, offices, etc..	Graaff-Reinet	Graaff-Reinet	Provincial Heritage Site	32°15′02″S 24°32′13″E	Upload Photo
9/2/033/0026	54 Bourke Street, Graaff-Reinet	Corner house with saddle roof and verandah on both streets. Low-pitch saddle roof. End gables have rough plaster, also in Somerset Street. Verandah with ogee roof on precast pillars and low dipped wall with flared entrance walls. 4 panel, old door with p Architectural style: Victorian. Type of site: House Current use: Residential. These buildings, with their Georgian Karoo style and Victorian features, which date mainly from the nineteenth century, form an integral part of the historical and architectural core of Graaff-Reinet, which was founded in 1785.	Graaff-Reinet	Graaff-Reinet	Provincial Heritage Site	32°15′05″S 24°32′00″E	Upload Photo
9/2/033/0027	Kromm's Inn, 3 Parliament Street, Graaff-Reinet	3 bay Karoo-type house with stepped parapet and decorated verandah. Karoo-type roof with stepped parapet and heavy cornice mouldings. Wall has rustication, eyebrow mouldings and moulded architraves. Verandah with hipped ogee roof with fine fretwork fri Architectural style: Karoo-type. Type of site: Hotel Current use: Bar.	Graaff-Reinet	Graaff-Reinet	Provincial Heritage Site	32°15′08″S 24°32′05″E	Upload Photo
9/2/033/0028	8 Napier Street, Graaff-Reinet	3 bay saddle-roofed house with covered front gable and verandah. Saddle roof with central covered gable with big square vent. Wall has rustication. Verandah with ogee roof on precast pillars and moulded, dipped walls. Slightly arched 3 × 3 panel double door Architectural style: Victorian. Type of site: House Current use: Residential. These buildings, with their Georgian Karoo style and Victorian characteristics and which date mainly from the nineteenth century, form an integral part of the historical and architectural core of Graaff-Reinet, which was founded in 1785.	Graaff-Reinet	Graaff-Reinet	Provincial Heritage Site	32°14′51″S 24°32′12″E	Upload Photo
9/2/033/0029	80 Somerset Street, Graaff-Reinet	A hipped roof, two-winged house with porch. Low-pitch hipped roof. 2 wings with semi-circular bays. Set-back porch between the two wings with roof on facebrick pillars and tiled top dwarf walls. Glazed double door with side-lights. Group of 3 side bay Architectural style: Edwardian. Type of site: House Current use: Residential. These buildings, with their Georgian Karoo style and Victorian features, which date mainly from the nineteenth century, form an integral part of the historical and architectural core of Graaff-Reinet, which was founded in 1785.	Graaff-Reinet	Graaff-Reinet	Provincial Heritage Site	32°15′07″S 24°31′53″E	Upload Photo
9/2/033/0030	104 Somerset Street, Graaff-Reinet	3 Bay cottage with low-pitch saddle roof, extension and stoep. Low-pitch saddle roof covering the gables. Finial and chimney on the right gable. Wall has rustication, corner quoins and eyebrow mouldings. Stoep has end walls and seats.4 × 4 panel doubl Architectural style: Victorian. Type of site: House Current use: Residential. These buildings, with their Georgian Karoo style and Victorian features, which date mainly from the nineteenth century, form an integral part of the historical and architectural core of Graaff-Reinet, which was founded in 1785.	Graaff-Reinet	Graaff-Reinet	Provincial Heritage Site	32°15′10″S 24°31′44″E	Upload Photo
9/2/033/0032	60 Stockenstroom Street, Graaff-Reinet	3 bay Karoo-type cottage with straight parapet and stoep. Attached to no. 58. Karoo-type roof with straight moulded parapet. Narrow stoep with facebrick end-wall. 4 panel door (possibly new), with plain fanlight. Sashes with louvred shutters. Architectural style: Karoo-type. Type of site: House Current use: Residential. These buildings, with their Georgian Karoo style and Victorian characteristics and which date mainly from the nineteenth century, form an integral part of the historical and architectural core of Graarf-Reinet, which was founded in 1785.	Graaff-Reinet	Graaff-Reinet	Provincial Heritage Site	32°15′06″S 24°31′44″E	Upload Photo
9/2/033/0034	Reinet Museum, 18 Church Street (Corner of Church Street and Somerset Street), Graaff-Reinet	An old hall building with 2 later pedimented wings with bays and a roofed porch between wings. Low pitch hipped roofs on main part. Free-standing. Wings have pedimented parapets with mouldings. Walls have plaster mouldings and architraves and quoins a Current use: Museum. These buildings, with their Georgian Karoo style and Victorian features, which date mainly from the nineteenth century, form an integral part of the historical and architectural core of Graaff-Reinet, which was founded in 1785.	Graaff-Reinet	Graaff-Reinet	Provincial Heritage Site	32°15′02″S 24°32′06″E	Upload Photo
9/2/033/0036	Old Congregational Church, 23 Parsonage Street, Graaff-Reinet	Straight-sided gable end with small belfry at the apex, a rosette window and arched windows and door. Wall is moulded along upper edge and has heavy moulded corner quoins. Arched 3 × 3 panel double door. 2 high, arched, small-pane windows (18 + 4 panes Type of site: Church Current use: Theatre.	Graaff-Reinet	Graaff-Reinet	Provincial Heritage Site	32°15′08″S 24°32′12″E	Straight-sided gable end with small belfry at the apex, a rosette window and arched windows and door. Wall is moulded along upper edge and has heavy moulded corner quoins. Arched 3 × 3 panel double door. 2 high, arched, small-pane windows (18 + 4 panes Type of site: Church Current use: Theatre.
9/2/033/0038	40 Cradock Street, Graaff-Reinet	6 Bay long pitched roofed house with pergola to front. – pitched roof with shouldered triangular end gables with arched louvred loft doors. Walls have woodmouldings to windows and fluted pilasters supporting moulded pediment over door. Stoep wi Type of site: House Current use: Residential. These buildings, with their Georgian Karoo style and Victorian characteristics and which date mainly from the nineteenth century, form an integral part of the historical and architectural core of Graaff-Reinet, which was founded in 1785.	Graaff-Reinet	Graaff-Reinet	Provincial Heritage Site	32°14′50″S 24°31′46″E	Upload Photo
9/2/033/0039	73 Cradock Street, Graaff-Reinet	3 bay Karoo-type cottage with straight parapet and verandah. Abuts 71. Karoo-type roof with straight moulded parapet. Wall has rustication and plain moulded door and window architraves. Verandah with straight roof on precast and dipped, moulded walls. Architectural style: Karoo-type. Type of site: House Current use: Residential. These buildings, with their Georgian Karoo style and Victorian characteristics and which date mainly from the nineteenth century, form an integral part of the historical and architectural core of Graaff-Reinet, which was founded in 1785.	Graaff-Reinet	Graaff-Reinet	Provincial Heritage Site	32°15′06″S 24°31′55″E	Upload Photo
9/2/033/0042	Dutch Reformed Church, Church Street, Graaff-Reinet	Teak doors. Pointed Gothic arches with stained glass windows. The "Groot Kerk" at Graaff-Reinet was designed after the style of Salisbury Cathedral in England by James Bisset, Cape Town architect The foundation stone was laid on 12 April 1886. Architectural style: Gothic Revival. (Style of Salisbury Cath., England). Type of site: Church Current use: Church.	Graaff-Reinet	Graaff-Reinet	Provincial Heritage Site	32°14′59″S 24°32′06″E	Teak doors. Pointed Gothic arches with stained glass windows. The "Groot Kerk" at Graaff-Reinet was designed after the style of Salisbury Cathedral in England by James Bisset, Cape Town architect The foundation stone was laid on 12 April 1886. Architectural style: Gothic Revival. (Style of Salisbury Cath., England). Type of site: Church Current use: Church. Media related to Dutch Reformed church, Graaff-Reinet at Wikimedia Commons
9/2/033/0043	5 Rothman Street, Graaff-Reinet	Hipped pitched and gabled asymmetrical winged house with gabled wing and verandah on high foundation. Hipped roof with dormer ventilator with trunated finial and gabled wing with moulded gable with rounded top. Ninche in gable. Very high foundation. Ey Architectural style: Victorian/Edwardian. Type of site: House Current use: Residential. These buildings, with their Georgian Karoo style and Victorian features, which date mainly from the nineteenth century, form an integral part of the historical and architectural core of Graaff-Reinet, which was founded in 1785.	Graaff-Reinet	Graaff-Reinet	Provincial Heritage Site	32°14′42″S 24°31′47″E	Upload Photo
9/2/033/0044	95 Cradock Street, Graaff-Reinet	5 bay saddle roofed house with verandah. Saddle roof with covered end gable with finial and solid loft door. Wall has rustication. Verandah with hipped ogee roof with fretwork fringe and wooden twin post supports. 4 panel door. 2 × 2 sashes with louv Architectural style: Victorian, or Victorianized Cape Dutch. Type of site: House Current use: Residential. These buildings, with their Georgian Karoo style and Victorian characteristics and which date mainly from the nineteenth century, form an integral part of the historical and architectural core of Graaff-Reinet, which was founded in 1785.	Graaff-Reinet	Graaff-Reinet	Provincial Heritage Site	32°15′15″S 24°32′00″E	Upload Photo
9/2/033/0047	Lettskraal, Graaff-Reinet District	Lettskraal house and farm building are of extreme historical and architectural importance. The former farm of Andries pretorius, before he left on the Great Trek, the complex at Lettskraal, despite their dilapidated conditions are probably the most intact	Graaff-Reinet	Graaff-Reinet	Provisional Protection	32°03′47″S 24°49′16″E	Upload Photo
9/2/033/0050	72 Cradock Street, Graaff-Reinet	Double storey corner building, 4 bays in Cradock Street and 2 bays in Caledon Street with stepped parapet and walls. Flat roof with stepped parapet, stoep moulded cornice. Roughcast walls with smooth raised plaster surround to openings, edges and b Type of site: House Current use: Residential. These buildings, with their Georgian Karoo style and Victorian characteristics and which date mainly from the nineteenth century, form an integral part of the historical and architectural core of Graaff-Reinet, which was founded in 1785.	Graaff-Reinet	Graaff-Reinet	Provincial Heritage Site	32°15′00″S 24°31′51″E	Upload Photo
9/2/033/0052	Drostdy Hotel, 28–30 Church Street, Graaff-Reinet	5 bay Cape Dutch thatched house with central and end convex gables and pilasters. Thatched saddle roof with convex Cape Dutch gables. Front wall has corner and central pilasters, the latter carrying a heavily moulded pediment. Stone paved stoep. Cape This building was designed by Louis Michel Thibault and erected in 1804–1806. It served as a drostdy until 1847 and since 1876 it has been used almost uninterruptedly as a hotel. The building has changed much since its erection but has been fully restored Architectural style: Cape Dutch. Type of site: Hotel Current use: Hotel. This building was designed by Louis Michel Thibault and erected in 1804–1806. It served as a drostdy until 1847 and since 1876 it has been used almost uninterruptedly as a hotel. The building has changed much since its erection but has been fully restored	Graaff-Reinet	Graaff-Reinet	Provincial Heritage Site	32°15′08″S 24°32′08″E	5 bay Cape Dutch thatched house with central and end convex gables and pilasters. Thatched saddle roof with convex Cape Dutch gables. Front wall has corner and central pilasters, the latter carrying a heavily moulded pediment. Stone paved stoep. Cape This building was designed by Louis Michel Thibault and erected in 1804–1806. It served as a drostdy until 1847 and since 1876 it has been used almost uninterruptedly as a hotel. The building has changed much since its erection but has been fully restored Architectural style: Cape Dutch. Type of site: Hotel Current use: Hotel. This building was designed by Louis Michel Thibault and erected in 1804–1806. It served as a drostdy until 1847 and since 1876 it has been used almost uninterruptedly as a hotel. The building has changed much since its erection but has been fully restored Media related to Drostdy Hotel, Graaff-Reinet at Wikimedia Commons
9/2/033/0057	Jewish Cemetery, Donkin Street, Graaff-Reinet	Cemetery with 19 identifiable headstones left. Surrounded by 1,6m plastered wall. Entrance through small building used as mortuary. 900 sq. m. The property on which the Jewish Cemetery is situated was granted to the Hebrew community of Graaff-Reinet by Sir George Grey, the then Governor of the Cape Colony, on 9 January 1858. Type of site: Cemetery Current use: Not in use any longer.	Graaff-Reinet	Graaff-Reinet	Provincial Heritage Site	32°15′12″S 24°31′40″E	Upload Photo
