= Cuyler =

Cuyler is a surname that has several origins, such as Dutch for "victory of the people" or Gaelic for "chapel". Kyler is an alternate spelling.

== People with the surname ==
- Abraham Cuyler (1742–1810), American businessman and mayor of Albany
- Sir Charles Cuyler, 4th Baronet (1867–1919), English cricketer and British Army officer
- Cornelis Cuyler (1697–1765), American politician and mayor of Albany
- Cornelius Cuyler (1740–1819), American soldier and British Army officer
- Jacob Glen Cuyler (1773–1854), South African magistrate
- Jeremiah La Touche Cuyler (1768–1839), American attorney and judge
- Johannes Cuyler (1661–1740), American merchant and mayor of Albany
- Kiki Cuyler (1898–1950), American baseball player
- May Cuyler (1871–1958), American socialite
- Milt Cuyler (b. 1968), American baseball player
- Richard M. Cuyler (1900–1980), founder of South Kent School
- Theodore L. Cuyler (1822–1909), Presbyterian minister
- Thomas DeWitt Cuyler (1854–1922), American railroad executive

== Fictional characters ==
- Cuyler family, the main characters of the Adult Swim animated comedy Squidbillies

== People with the given name ==
- Cuyler Hastings (c. 1864–1914) American stage actor

== Places ==
South Africa

- Cuylerville, Eastern Cape

United States

- Cuyler, New York
- Cuylerville, New York

== See also ==
- Cuyler baronets
- Cuyler Presbyterian Church, Brooklyn
- USS R. R. Cuyler (1860), a steamship built in 1860
