= Kiler =

Kiler may refer to:

- Kiler (film), 1997 Polish comedy
- Kiler (company), Turkish conglomerate
- Kiler, Republic of Dagestan, Russia, rural locality

== See also ==
- Killer (disambiguation)
- Kyler, given name
