= Hamilton baronets of Woodbrook (1814) =

Extinct baronetcy

Hamilton of Woodbrook Baronetcy
- Arms of the Hamilton baronets of Woodbrook
- Creation date: 21 December 1814
- Baronetage: Baronetage of United Kingdom
- Status: Extinct
- Extinction date: 12 January 1876

The Hamilton baronetcy, of Woodbrook in the County of Tyrone, was created in the Baronetage of the United Kingdom on 21 December 1814 for the soldier John Hamilton. The title became extinct on the death of the 2nd Baronet in 1876.

== Hamilton baronets, of Woodbrook (1814) ==
- Sir John James Hamilton, 1st Baronet (1755–1835)
- Sir James John Hamilton, 2nd Baronet (1802–1876)

== Notes ==
Baronetage of the United Kingdom
Preceded by Cuyler baronets	Hamilton baronets of Woodbrook; 21 December 1814	Succeeded by Leigh baronets
