= Mary Holland (disambiguation) =

Mary Holland (born 1985) is an American actress and comedian.

Mary Holland may also refer to:

- Mary Holland (activist) (before 1900–after 1940), Irish anti-treaty supporter
- Mary Holland (journalist) (1935–2004), Irish journalist
- Mary Holland, English actress, played "Katie" in many Oxo commercials (1958–76)
- Mary A. Gardner Holland (before 1840–after 1898), Union nurse during the American Civil War
- Mary E. Holland (1868–1915), American detective and fingerprint expert
- Mary Jane Holland (c. 1840–after 1858), first love of George Armstrong Custer
- "Mary Jane Holland" (song), song by Lady Gaga from her 2013 album Artpop

== See also ==
- Maria Elizabeth Holland (1836–1878), South African botanical artist and plant collector
- Mary Fox, Baroness Holland (1746–1778), British baroness
- Mary Holland Kinkaid (1861–1948), American novelist and journalist
