= List of heritage sites in Eastern Cape =

This is a list of the heritage sites in Eastern Cape as recognized by the South African Heritage Resource Agency. For performance reasons some districts have been split off from this list:

- List of heritage sites in Albany
- List of heritage sites in Graaff-Reinet
- List of heritage sites in Port Elizabeth

SAHRA identifier	Site name	Description	Town	District	NHRA status	Coordinates	Image
	Fort Murray, Zwelitsha District	After the Sixth Xhosa War (1834—1835) Sir Benjamin D'Urban annexed all the land between the Keiskamma and the Kei Rivers as part of the Cape Colony and called it the Province of Queen Adelaide. To protect this territory he started to build a network of forts. Type of site: Fort.	Zwelitsha	Zwelitsha	Provincial Heritage Site	32°57′00″S 27°28′00″E	Upload Photo
4/K/Ped/2	Cavalry Barracks and Stables, Peddie	This military building complex was erected in about 1840 and until 1862 served as an important centre of among others, the Cape Mounted Riflemen. Hereafter some of the military buildings were used for many years as the Residency and postmaster's dwelling. Type of site: Stables, Barracks.	Peddie	Peddie	Provincial Heritage Site	33°11′00″S 27°15′24″E	Upload Photo
9/2/001/0003	Post Office and Magistrate's Court, Grey Street, Aberdeen	Type of site: Courthouse and Post Office Current use: Magistrate's Court and Post Office. Naude's nek is the highest mountain pass in the country and possibly the continent, that is negotiable by ordinary vehicles. Sani Pass, whose highest point is in Lesotho, is negotiable only by specialise off road vehicles.	Aberdeen	Aberdeen	Provincial Heritage Site	32°28′26″S 24°04′02″E	Type of site: Courthouse and Post Office Current use: Magistrate's Court and Post Office. Naude's nek is the highest mountain pass in the country and possibly the continent, that is negotiable by ordinary vehicles. Sani Pass, whose highest point is in Lesotho, is negotiable only by specialise off road vehicles.
9/2/002/0004	Our Heritage Museum, Queen Street, Adelaide	This parsonage was erected in about 1860 for the Rev. G. W. Stegman. The double-storeyed building is predominantly in the Georgian style and has large adjacent outbuildings dating from the same period. Architectural style: Georgian. Type of site: House Previous use: Residential. Current use: Museum.	Adelaide	Adelaide	Provincial Heritage Site	32°42′36″S 26°17′50″E	This parsonage was erected in about 1860 for the Rev. G. W. Stegman. The double-storeyed building is predominantly in the Georgian style and has large adjacent outbuildings dating from the same period. Architectural style: Georgian. Type of site: House Previous use: Residential. Current use: Museum.
9/2/002/0005	Glen Thorn Presbyterian Church, Glen Thorn, Adelaide District	The farm Glen Thorn lies about 26 kilometres north of Adelaide, on the left side of the road to Tarkastad. On this farm, in the Macazana Valley, there is a small church of great historical importance. Build of sandstone, plastered for protection 20 years Glen Thorn was granted in 1824 to John Pringle, a brother of Thomas Pringle the author and leader of the Scottish Party. It was John Pringle who built this stone church in 1840. The first minister was the Rev. John Forbes Cumming. Type of site: Church Current use: Church. 14 km from Bedford turn left to the R344. Travel for 6,3km to T-junction. Turn left. Travel for 21,4km. Take turn-off to left (Glen Thorn). Church is 5,5km from turn-off. 5,1km from T-Junction to Adelaide. R344 is 7.3 km from Adelaide bridge. Oldest Presbyterian Church building used continuously for worship in the Eastern Cape. Built 1840.		Adelaide	Provincial Heritage Site	32°28′30″S 26°14′02″E	Upload Photo
9/2/004/0003	Christ Church, Church Street, Burgersdorp	Architecturally, it is a high-roofed late-Victorian church building with neo—Gothic features. The east end has a facade broken by three lancet windows heavily rusticated and underlined by a plaster pediment. The side facades have three round-head casements. Towards 1844 about 300 families living between the Stormsbergspruit and the Kraai River were granted permission by the Dutch Reformed presbytery of Graaff-Reinet to establish a parish of their own. 27 December 1847 they purchased the farm Klipfontein. Type of site: Church Current use: Church : Anglican. This church with its neo-Gothic features dates from the 1860s. The chancel was erected in 1902.	Burgersdorp	Albert	Provincial Heritage Site	30°59′32″S 26°19′57″E	Upload Photo
9/2/004/0004	De Bruin House, 66 Van der Walt Street, Burgersdorp	This cottage in the typical Karoo style was erected shortly after the founding of Burgersdorp in 1847. It was originally the town house of the De Bruins of Witkop. Type of site: House Current use: Museum.	Burgersdorp	Albert	Provincial Heritage Site	30°59′34″S 26°19′51″E	Upload Photo
9/2/004/0005	Old Gaol, Van der Walt Street, Burgersdorp	This gaol was completed in 1861 and played an important role during the Anglo-Boer War and the Rebellion of 1914. Type of site: Gaol Current use: Military Headquarters.	Burgersdorp	Albert	Provincial Heritage Site	30°59′36″S 26°19′50″E	Upload Photo
9/2/004/0006	Old Reformed Church Parsonage, Piet Retief Street, Burgersdorp	This Victorian house dates from the middle of the nineteenth century. From 1868 it served as parsonage for Prof. Dirk Postma, founder of the Reformed Church in South Africa. Prof. Jan Lion-Cachet also lived here from 1895. Type of site: Parsonage Current use: Museum.	Burgersdorp	Albert	Provincial Heritage Site	30°59′44″S 26°19′50″E	Upload Photo
9/2/004/0007	Coetzee House, 51 Piet Retief Street, Burgersdorp	This cottage in the typical Karoo style was erected shortly after the founding of Burgersdorp in 1847. It was originally the town house of the Coetzees of the farm Swartfontein. Type of site: House Current use: Museum.	Burgersdorp	Albert	Provincial Heritage Site	30°59′42″S 26°19′49″E	Upload Photo
9/2/004/0008	Taal Monument, Burger Square, Burgersdorp	The monument consists of a figure of a woman pointing with a finger at a tablet held in her left arm. On the tablet are the words 'De overwinning der Hollandse Taal'. The figure stands on a massive granite base with suitable inscriptions. The monument ori The Theological Seminary, now in Potchefstroom, started in Burghersdorp and it was the centre of a strong movement for the recognition of Dutch as an official language. This is commemorated by the 'Taalmonument' which stands on Burger Square. Type of site: Memorial. Current use: Memorial.	Burgersdorp	Albert	Provincial Heritage Site	30°59′38″S 26°19′53″E	The monument consists of a figure of a woman pointing with a finger at a tablet held in her left arm. On the tablet are the words 'De overwinning der Hollandse Taal'. The figure stands on a massive granite base with suitable inscriptions. The monument ori The Theological Seminary, now in Potchefstroom, started in Burghersdorp and it was the centre of a strong movement for the recognition of Dutch as an official language. This is commemorated by the 'Taalmonument' which stands on Burger Square. Type of site: Memorial. Current use: Memorial. Media related to Dutch language monument at Wikimedia Commons
9/2/004/0009	Jubilee Fountain, Burger Square, Burgersdorp	Type of site: Memorial. Current use: Memorial.	Burgersdorp	Albert	Provincial Heritage Site	30°59′36″S 26°19′54″E	Type of site: Memorial. Current use: Memorial.
9/2/004/0010	Anglo-Boer War Blockhouse #1, Burgersdorp	In Burgersdorp there is not only a monument to commemorate the struggle for the recognition of Dutch, but also another brings to mind the three-year-long Anglo Boer War. By this we do not refer to the Burger Monument, but to a blockhouse. Type of site: Blockhouse	Burgersdorp	Albert	Provincial Heritage Site	30°59′37″S 26°19′31″E	In Burgersdorp there is not only a monument to commemorate the struggle for the recognition of Dutch, but also another brings to mind the three-year-long Anglo Boer War. By this we do not refer to the Burger Monument, but to a blockhouse. Type of site: Blockhouse
9/2/004/0011	Old Reformed Church Theological Seminary, Burgersdorp	In Piet Retief Street, between President Swart Road and Chase Street, the old parsonage of the Reformed congregation of Burgersdorp is situated. Behind it stands a modest outbuilding. In this outbuilding the Theological Seminary of the Reformed Church in this building the Theological Seminary of the Gereformeerde Kerk in Suid-Afrika was established in 1869. In 1905 this institution was moved to Potchefstroom where it eventually gave rise to the Potchefstroom University for Christian Higher Education. Type of site: Theological seminary. Current use: Museum.	Burgersdorp	Albert	Provincial Heritage Site	30°59′32″S 26°19′54″E	Upload Photo
9/2/004/0014	Dutch Reformed Church, Coetzee Street, Burgersdorp	Type of site: Church. Current use: Church : Dutch Reformed.	Burgersdorp	Albert	Provincial Heritage Site	30°59′44″S 26°19′50″E	Type of site: Church. Current use: Church : Dutch Reformed.
9/2/005/0003	Dias Cross Memorial, Kwaaihoek, Alexandria District	A minor road turns sharply off to the right from the main road that leads from Alexandria to Bushman’s River Mouth; it passes Boknes and comes to an end near the coast. About a kilometre further east from the end of the road, beyond the sand dunes, lies K Bartholomew Diaz, the famous Portuguese navigator and discoverer of the Cape, erected a cross or padrao on 12 March 1488 at Kwaaihoek. A replica of the cross has been erected on the same bleak, exposed spot, high above the waves. Type of site: Memorial.	Alexandria	Alexandria	Provincial Heritage Site	33°39′13″S 26°24′30″E	Upload Photo
9/2/005/0004	Dutch Reformed Church, Voortrekker Street, Alexandria	Type of site: Church. Current use: Church.	Alexandria	Alexandria	Provincial Heritage Site	33°39′13″S 26°24′35″E	Type of site: Church. Current use: Church. Media related to Dutch Reformed Church, Alexandria at Wikimedia Commons
9/2/006/0005	Concentration Camp Garden of Remembrance, Aliwal North	Current use: Garden. The property is located 488 km from Port Elizabeth and located on the fringe of the CBD of Aliwal North, abutting the main road en route to Jameston-Queenstown, East London. The property is over the road from the Aliwal High School.	Aliwal North	Aliwal North		30°42′17″S 26°42′30″E	Upload Photo
9/2/006/0010	J W Sauer Bridge, Kraai River, Aliwal North District	This sandstone bridge with its four graceful arches was opened on 23 September 1881 by the then Minister of Railways and Harbours, Mr J. W. Sauer. Type of site: Bridge Current use: Bridge.	Aliwal North	Aliwal North	Provincial Heritage Site	30°44′14″S 26°47′03″E	Upload Photo
9/2/006/0011	Anglo-Boer War Blockhouse #2, off Barkly Street, Aliwal North	This blockhouse, together with the second blockhouse on the southern side of Aliwal North, played an important strategic part during the Anglo-Boer War against the invading Republican commandos. Type of site: Blockhouse. Current use: Blockhouse : Anglo-Boer War.	Aliwal North	Aliwal North	Provincial Heritage Site	30°41′15″S 26°43′10″E	This blockhouse, together with the second blockhouse on the southern side of Aliwal North, played an important strategic part during the Anglo-Boer War against the invading Republican commandos. Type of site: Blockhouse. Current use: Blockhouse : Anglo-Boer War.
9/2/006/0012	Anglo-Boer War Blockhouse #1, Valk Street, Aliwal North	The town of Aliwal North owes its existence mainly to two of the oldest and most convenient drifts through the Orange River that formerly provided access between the Cape Colony and the Transgariep. Consequently it was of special strategic importance. Type of site: Blockhouse. Current use: Blockhouse : Anglo-Boer War.	Aliwal North	Aliwal North	Provincial Heritage Site	30°42′15″S 26°42′55″E	Upload Photo
9/2/007/0004	Loch Bridge, Kraai River, Barkly East District	Type of site: Bridge. Current use: Bridge. Take Divisional Road 3214 from Barkly East towards Lady Grey. Take New England turn-off. The Loch Bridge is crossed at 6,5km.	Barkly East	Barkly East	Provincial Heritage Site	30°54′23″S 27°34′20″E	Type of site: Bridge. Current use: Bridge. Take Divisional Road 3214 from Barkly East towards Lady Grey. Take New England turn-off. The Loch Bridge is crossed at 6,5km.
9/2/007/0006	Dutch Reformed Church, 125 Molteno Street, Barkly East	Type of site: Church. Current use: Church : Dutch Reformed. The Barkly East Dutch Reformed Church is a very fine example of a religious building executed in sandstone. Besides the fine detailing of the exterior, this church, completed in 1907, has an interior which is still an accurate example of its period.	Barkly East	Barkly East	Provincial Heritage Site	30°58′02″S 27°35′35″E	Type of site: Church. Current use: Church : Dutch Reformed. The Barkly East Dutch Reformed Church is a very fine example of a religious building executed in sandstone. Besides the fine detailing of the exterior, this church, completed in 1907, has an interior which is still an accurate example of its period.
9/2/007/0007	Old Primary School building, Visser Street, Rhodes	The facade is flanked by two gables at either end. Built in a U shape, the school has a roof of corrugated iron which extends over the building at the rear elevation to form a veranda which is supported by seven square stone pillars. Believed to have been designed by Sir Herbert Baker this sandstone building was erected during the last decade of the 19th century. As a result of the depopulation of Rhodes the school fell into disuse. Type of site: School. Current use: Residential.	Rhodes	Barkly East	Provincial Heritage Site	30°58′11″S 28°15′50″E	Upload Photo
9/2/007/0012	Naudes Nek Pass, Barkly East District	Type of site: Pass. Current use: Mountain Pass.	Barkly East	Barkly East	Provincial Heritage Site	30°43′57″S 28°08′13″E	Upload Photo
9/2/009/0010	Pig and Whistle Hotel, Kowie Road, Bathurst	Type of site: Hotel.	Bathurst	Bathurst	Provincial Heritage Site	33°30′13″S 26°49′27″E	Type of site: Hotel.
9/2/009/0011	White Gables, 15 Park Road, Port Alfred	This early Victorian dwelling-house with its two impressive triangular front gables dates from the 1830s and was erected by Captain Thomas Cowedroy. The two murals in the billiard room are also noteworthy Type of site: Residence. Current use: Residential.	Port Alfred	Bathurst	Provincial Heritage Site	33°35′26″S 26°53′43″E	This early Victorian dwelling-house with its two impressive triangular front gables dates from the 1830s and was erected by Captain Thomas Cowedroy. The two murals in the billiard room are also noteworthy Type of site: Residence. Current use: Residential.
9/2/009/0012	Old Powder Magazine, Bathurst	The historic powder magazine at Bathurst was erected in 1821 and carried, as regular stock, approximately 273 kilograms of gunpowder, 7000 ball cartridges and 60 rifles. It is an excellent example of British military architecture of the early nineteenth century. Type of site: Powder Magazine.	Bathurst	Bathurst	Provincial Heritage Site	33°29′00″S 26°50′00″E	The historic powder magazine at Bathurst was erected in 1821 and carried, as regular stock, approximately 273 kilograms of gunpowder, 7000 ball cartridges and 60 rifles. It is an excellent example of British military architecture of the early nineteenth century. Type of site: Powder Magazine.
9/2/009/0013	Bradshaw's Mill, Bathurst	The structure originally consisted of two storeys measuring 5 m by 4 m internally. A third storey of brick was somewhat smaller and was probably added later. The roof was of slate from North Wales, brought out to Port Elizabeth as ships' ballast. This wool mill was built in 1821 by Samuel Bradshaw, an 1820 Settler. It played an important role in the history of the wool industry in South Africa. The remains of the first wool mill to be built in the Eastern Province and probably the first in South Africa. Type of site: Mill.	Bathurst	Bathurst	Provincial Heritage Site	33°30′35″S 26°48′54″E	The structure originally consisted of two storeys measuring 5 m by 4 m internally. A third storey of brick was somewhat smaller and was probably added later. The roof was of slate from North Wales, brought out to Port Elizabeth as ships' ballast. This wool mill was built in 1821 by Samuel Bradshaw, an 1820 Settler. It played an important role in the history of the wool industry in South Africa. The remains of the first wool mill to be built in the Eastern Province and probably the first in South Africa. Type of site: Mill.
9/2/009/0014	Methodist Church complex, Clumber, Bathurst District	On this site the Nottingham party of British Settlers held a service of thanksgiving on their arrival in 1820 and built the first church in 1825. The second church, which replaced it in 1837, served as a defence station in 1846 during the hostilities. Type of site: Church Complex. On	Bathurst	Bathurst	Provincial Heritage Site	33°29′00″S 26°50′00″E	On this site the Nottingham party of British Settlers held a service of thanksgiving on their arrival in 1820 and built the first church in 1825. The second church, which replaced it in 1837, served as a defence station in 1846 during the hostilities. Type of site: Church Complex. On
9/2/009/0016	Methodist Church, York Road, Bathurst	Besides St. John’s Church there is a second church with important historical associations in Bathurst. This one, too, has strong links with the history of the 1820 Settlers. This church was built in 1832 by Settlers who belonged to the Methodist Church. Type of site: Church.	Bathurst	Bathurst	Provincial Heritage Site	33°30′14″S 26°49′22″E	Besides St. John’s Church there is a second church with important historical associations in Bathurst. This one, too, has strong links with the history of the 1820 Settlers. This church was built in 1832 by Settlers who belonged to the Methodist Church. Type of site: Church.
9/2/009/0017	St Stephen's Church, Ostrich Spring, Bathurst District	Type of site: Church. St Stephen's is a fine historical country church, recently restored to full use. It complements the collection of country churches in the Lower Albany Region such as St John's in Bathurst and St Mary's in Cuylerville, and fully warrants recognition.	Bathurst	Bathurst	Register	33°29′00″S 26°50′00″E	Upload Photo
9/2/009/0019	Fossil Exposure, Birbury, Bathurst District	The farm Birbury lies several kilometres east of Bathurst, on the road to Trappes Valley. Where the road descends a steep hill near the farm, another gravel road branches to the left amongst the bushes. Here an outcrop of gravelly limestone which forms th Approx 300m from Birbury farm. Face west. On the western side of the road there is a survey beacon. Just to the right of the beacon there is a fenced right-of-way to the site.	Bathurst	Bathurst	Provincial Heritage Site	33°28′45″S 26°55′55″E	Upload Photo
9/2/009/0020	Settlers Methodist Church, Bathurst Street, Port Alfred	The original Settlers Church on this site was opened in 1827. This church was destroyed by fire during the Frontier War of 1835 and thereafter rebuilt. It was again seriously damaged by the Xhosas in 1846. The church was built in 1823 by the Settlers themselves. Type of site: Church.	Port Alfred	Bathurst	Provincial Heritage Site	33°35′47″S 26°53′16″E	The original Settlers Church on this site was opened in 1827. This church was destroyed by fire during the Frontier War of 1835 and thereafter rebuilt. It was again seriously damaged by the Xhosas in 1846. The church was built in 1823 by the Settlers themselves. Type of site: Church.
9/2/009/0021	Port Alfred Railway Station, Port Alfred	This station building, which dates from the early 1880s was presumably erected by George Pauling, the local rail way engineer, for the firm R. Firbank & Co., to whom the building contract was granted. Type of site: Railway Station.	Port Alfred	Bathurst	Provincial Heritage Site	33°35′23″S 26°53′21″E	Upload Photo
9/2/009/0022	Bleak House, Trappes Street, Bathurst	This double-storey stone building is a typical Bathurst cottage of the 1820-period.	Bathurst	Bathurst	Provincial Heritage Site	33°30′07″S 26°49′26″E	This double-storey stone building is a typical Bathurst cottage of the 1820-period.
9/2/009/0023	St John's Church, Donkin Street, Bathurst	Bathurst is situated some 16 kilometres from Port Alfred, on the road to Grahamstown. This fine church was built by 1820 settlers. The foundation stone was laid in 1832. It repeatedly served as a place of refuge and fortification during times of war. This is indeed the heart of the area where the 1820 Settlers established themselves. Type of site: Church.	Bathurst	Bathurst	Provincial Heritage Site	33°30′07″S 26°49′10″E	Bathurst is situated some 16 kilometres from Port Alfred, on the road to Grahamstown. This fine church was built by 1820 settlers. The foundation stone was laid in 1832. It repeatedly served as a place of refuge and fortification during times of war. This is indeed the heart of the area where the 1820 Settlers established themselves. Type of site: Church.
9/2/009/0024	Bailey's Beacon and 1820 Toposcope, Bathurst	Col. Jacob Cuyler's Camp stood on this site when he supervised the settlement of the 1820 settlers on their allotments. The Governor, Sir Rufane Donkin also pitched his camp here when he determined the site of the town of Bathurst. Type of site: Memorial, Beacon Current use: Memorial.	Bathurst	Bathurst	Provincial Heritage Site	33°29′46″S 26°50′39″E	Col. Jacob Cuyler's Camp stood on this site when he supervised the settlement of the 1820 settlers on their allotments. The Governor, Sir Rufane Donkin also pitched his camp here when he determined the site of the town of Bathurst. Type of site: Memorial, Beacon Current use: Memorial.
9/2/009/0025	St Mary's Church, Cuylerville, Bathurst District	A gravel road from Bathurst runs parallel with the coast and leads to the mouth of the Great Fish River. About halfway to the Fish River, on the right side of the road, there stands a modest building amongst thick bushes and overshadowed by a giant blue-gum tree. A party of 256 settlers under Lieut. John Baillie R.N. established themselves here in 1820 and named the place Cuylerville. On this site they built a church and school. which also served as a fortification against the repeated attacks of the Xhosas. The p Type of site: Church.	Bathurst	Bathurst	Provincial Heritage Site	33°29′36″S 27°00′49″E	Upload Photo
9/2/009/0026	Lombard's Post, Bathurst District	The fort was built on a polygonal plan with four main buildings linked by loopholed walls enclosing a central double-storeyed barracks and barn and three double-storeyed dwellings, all linked by high walls. Apart from the farmhouse there were the main bar Lombard's Post was originally granted to Pieter Lombard in 1790 as a loan farm. It served as a military fortification during the Fourth and Sixth Frontier Wars. During the second half of the nineteenth century the farm buildings were fortified by the then owner, Benjamin Keeton. Type of site: Military/Farm.	Bathurst	Bathurst	Provincial Heritage Site	33°32′53″S 26°41′49″E	Upload Photo
9/2/011/0002-078	18 Cradock Street, Bedford	Type of site: House Current use: Residential. No 18 Cradock road Bedford is a good example of a Georgian type house that has remained little altered since its erection in 1855. It remains as an important landmark in a street that has been greatly changed over the years.	Bedford	Bedford	Register	32°40′43″S 26°05′05″E	Upload Photo
9/2/011/0003	1828 and 1874 Dutch Reformed Churches, Glen Lynden, Bedford District	The older church, which dates from 1828, was erected in the simple vernacular style. It is T-shaped and, together with the other neighbouring church, which was erected in 1874 in the neo-Gothic style, it forms an important architectural group. Type of site: Church.	Bedford	Bedford	Provincial Heritage Site	32°40′57″S 26°06′24″E	The older church, which dates from 1828, was erected in the simple vernacular style. It is T-shaped and, together with the other neighbouring church, which was erected in 1874 in the neo-Gothic style, it forms an important architectural group. Type of site: Church.
9/2/011/0003/001	1828 Dutch Reformed Church, Glen Lynden, Bedford District	Type of site: Church.	Bedford	Bedford	Provincial Heritage Site	32°40′57″S 26°06′24″E	Type of site: Church.
9/2/011/0003/002	1874 Dutch Reformed Church, Glen Lynden, Bedford District	The sturdy stone church at Glen-Lynden was built as a result of co-operation between the Scottish 1820 Settlers and their Dutch-Afrikaner neighbours to meet their need for a church of their own. It was built in 1828 under the leadership of Thomas Pringle Type of site: Church.	Bedford	Bedford	Provincial Heritage Site	32°40′57″S 26°06′24″E	The sturdy stone church at Glen-Lynden was built as a result of co-operation between the Scottish 1820 Settlers and their Dutch-Afrikaner neighbours to meet their need for a church of their own. It was built in 1828 under the leadership of Thomas Pringle Type of site: Church.
9/2/011/0005	Old Dairy, Avondale, Bedford District		Bedford	Bedford	Register	32°33′55″S 26°00′25″E	Upload Photo
9/2/020/0003	Hilton Methodist Church complex, Hilton, Cathcart District	Type of site: Church Complex.	Cathcart	Cathcart	Provincial Heritage Site	32°17′51″S 27°08′32″E	Upload Photo
9/2/020/0003-001	First Church, Hilton Methodist Church complex, Hilton, Cathcart District	Type of site: Church.	Cathcart	Cathcart	Provincial Heritage Site	32°17′59″S 27°08′37″E	Upload Photo
9/2/020/0003-002	Second Church, Hilton Methodist Church complex, Hilton, Cathcart District	Type of site: Church.	Cathcart	Cathcart	Provincial Heritage Site	32°18′00″S 27°08′00″E	Upload Photo
9/2/020/0003-003	School, Hilton Methodist Church complex, Hilton, Cathcart District	Type of site: School.	Cathcart	Cathcart	Provincial Heritage Site	32°18′00″S 27°08′00″E	Upload Photo
9/2/020/0010	1853 Milestone, Stone Ridge, Cathcart District	Type of site: Milestone.		Cathcart	Provincial Heritage Site	32°22′07″S 27°10′45″E	Upload Photo
9/2/020/0012	Van Coller Museum, Main Street, Cathcart	Current use: Museum.	Cathcart	Cathcart	Provincial Heritage Site	32°17′54″S 27°08′46″E	Upload Photo
9/2/020/0013	Town Hall, Main Street, Cathcart	Type of site: Town Hall Current use: Satellite Office: Amahlathi municipality office.	Cathcart	Cathcart	Provincial Heritage Site	32°31′46″S 27°20′39″E	Type of site: Town Hall Current use: Satellite Office: Amahlathi municipality office.
9/2/020/0014	Elliots and Cathcart Fruiterers, Main Street, Cathcart	Type of site: Elliots Attonerys.	Cathcart	Cathcart	Provincial Heritage Site	32°17′53″S 27°08′46″E	Upload Photo
9/2/020/0015	Standard Bank, Main Street, Cathcart	Type of site: Bank Current use: Bank.	Cathcart	Cathcart	Provincial Heritage Site	32°17′54″S 27°08′47″E	Type of site: Bank Current use: Bank.
9/2/020/0016	Cathcart Library, Main Street, Cathcart	Type of site: Library Current use: Library.	Cathcart	Cathcart	Provincial Heritage Site	32°17′54″S 27°08′48″E	Type of site: Library Current use: Library.
9/2/020/0017	Kenya Corner Cottages, Cathcart	Current use: Satellite office: Tourism information centre.	Cathcart	Cathcart	Provincial Heritage Site	32°23′45″S 27°12′39″E	Upload Photo
9/2/020/0018/001	Settler fortification, Hilton, Cathcart District	.	Cathcart	Cathcart	Provincial Heritage Site	32°18′00″S 27°08′00″E	Upload Photo
9/2/020/0018/002	Settler cottage, Hilton, Cathcart District	.	Cathcart	Cathcart	Provincial Heritage Site	32°18′00″S 27°08′00″E	Upload Photo
9/2/024/0003	Old Congregational Church, 1 High Street, Cradock	Gothic revival church with rectangular plan, vestry to side. Entrance at front on axis. Lancet windows. ventilation gablets. This neo-Gothic church was erected in 1853 by the Revd. Robert Barry Taylor, the then missionary in Cradock of the London Mission Society. It is a replica of the Harpenden Chapel in England. Type of site: Church Current use: Vacant. The property is located 250 km from Port Elizabeth. The property is adjacent to Tam's Built It Builders Yard and across from retail trade i.e Ellerines Furniture Store, Ok Bazaars and the Inland Revenue Office.	Cradock	Cradock	Provincial Heritage Site	32°10′22″S 25°37′08″E	Upload Photo
9/2/024/0009	Olive Schreiner Sarcophagus, Buffelskop, Cradock District	Type of site: Grave.	Cradock	Cradock	Provincial Heritage Site	32°16′50″S 25°37′22″E	Upload Photo
9/2/024/0010	Doornhoek homestead, Mountain Zebra National Park, Cradock District	.	Cradock	Cradock	Provincial Heritage Site	32°13′25″S 25°28′46″E	Upload Photo
9/2/024/0011	Old Dutch Reformed Parsonage, 87 High Street, Cradock	Symmetrical single-storey ridged building and outbuilding, with end gable lean to at back, with stoep to front. Original front door and fanlight. Louvres and 12/12 sash windows outside. Staircase to solder and bakoond. This property was probably granted to the Church Council of the local D.R. Church early in the 19th century, although the building of the parsonage and cart shed was only commenced in 1848. The parsonage, which was used as such until 1904, is mainly assoc Architectural style: Cape Dutch. Type of site: Pastorie. Current use: Museum.	Cradock	Cradock	Provincial Heritage Site	31°10′14″S 25°37′02″E	Upload Photo
9/2/024/0012	Dutch Reformed Church, Stockenstroom Street, Cradock	Impressive neo-classical church based on Sir Christopher Wren's design for St Martin in the Field, Trafalgar Square, London. Fine detailing in stone, especially clock tower. Impressive pedimented stepped entrance supported by stone columns. This church building is situated on the same site where the first Dutch Reformed Church in Cradock was built between 1821 and 1824. Construction work on the present church commenced in January 1864 and it was consecrated on 10 September 1868. Type of site: Church. Current use: Religious.	Cradock	Cradock	Provincial Heritage Site	32°10′09″S 25°37′01″E	Impressive neo-classical church based on Sir Christopher Wren's design for St Martin in the Field, Trafalgar Square, London. Fine detailing in stone, especially clock tower. Impressive pedimented stepped entrance supported by stone columns. This church building is situated on the same site where the first Dutch Reformed Church in Cradock was built between 1821 and 1824. Construction work on the present church commenced in January 1864 and it was consecrated on 10 September 1868. Type of site: Church. Current use: Religious. Media related to Dutch Reformed Church, Cradock at Wikimedia Commons
9/2/024/0013	38 Bree Street, Cradock	Symmetrical single-storey ridged building extended to side, with central and end gables. Stoep to front. T plan. Architectural style: Cape Dutch. This Cape Dutch house with its simple concavo-convex front gable dates from the eighteen thirties. Type of site: Residence. Current use: Residential.	Cradock	Cradock	Provincial Heritage Site	32°10′28″S 25°37′07″E	Symmetrical single-storey ridged building extended to side, with central and end gables. Stoep to front. T plan. Architectural style: Cape Dutch. This Cape Dutch house with its simple concavo-convex front gable dates from the eighteen thirties. Type of site: Residence. Current use: Residential. Media related to 38 Bree Street, Cradock at Wikimedia Commons
9/2/024/0014	38 Stockenstroom Street, Cradock	Symmetrical single-storey ridged building with end gable with verandah to front. Type of site: Residence. Current use: Empty.	Cradock	Cradock	Provincial Heritage Site	32°10′15″S 25°37′05″E	Upload Photo
9/2/024/0015	Olive Schreiner House, 9 Cross Street, Cradock	Single-storey Karoo-style flat-roofed building with stoep to front. Type of site: Residence. Current use: Museum.	Cradock	Cradock	Provincial Heritage Site	32°10′24″S 25°37′04″E	Single-storey Karoo-style flat-roofed building with stoep to front. Type of site: Residence. Current use: Museum.
9/2/026/0003	Gately House, 1 Park Gates Road, East London	(a) Single storied plastered brick structure over stone foundation. Corrugated iron roof. Verandah – 3 sides. Doors and windows – wood. This house was completed in 1878 and belonged to John Gately, a well-known local dealer and member of the Municipality of East London. The building which is at present a museum, contains a unique collection of Victorian furniture which belonged to Gately. Current use: East London Museum Board of Trustees.	East London, CBD	East London	Provincial Heritage Site	33°01′07″S 27°54′06″E	Upload Photo
9/2/026/0005	City Hall, Oxford Street, East London	Double storied plastered brick. Corrugated iron pitched roof behind parapets. Doors and windows- wood. Special feature: Clock tower and copper clad Spire. Architectural style: Victorian Renaissance. These three buildings, with their Victorian, neo-classical and Renaissance features, form an integral part of the historical and architectural core of East London. Moreover, each of these buildings can, in its own right, be described as unique. Type of site: City Hall. Current use: Mayor's Parlour/Council Chamber/Conference Centre.	East London, CBD	East London	Provincial Heritage Site	33°00′53″S 27°54′14″E	Double storied plastered brick. Corrugated iron pitched roof behind parapets. Doors and windows- wood. Special feature: Clock tower and copper clad Spire. Architectural style: Victorian Renaissance. These three buildings, with their Victorian, neo-classical and Renaissance features, form an integral part of the historical and architectural core of East London. Moreover, each of these buildings can, in its own right, be described as unique. Type of site: City Hall. Current use: Mayor's Parlour/Council Chamber/Conference Centre. Media related to East London Town Hall at Wikimedia Commons
9/2/026/0006	Old Methodist Church, Ncera, East London District	Type of site: Church.	East London	East London	Provincial Heritage Site	33°08′33″S 27°34′13″E	Upload Photo
9/2/026/0007	Bronze cannon salvaged from the wreck of the Nossa Senhora de Atalaia do Pinheiro	Type of site: Gun.	East London	East London	Heritage Object		Upload Photo
9/2/026/0007-001	Bronze Bocarro Cannon, salvaged from the wreck of the Nossa Senhora de Atalaia do Pinheiro	Type of site: Gun.	East London	East London	Heritage Object		Upload Photo
9/2/026/0007-002	Bronze Feyo naval cannon, salvaged from the wreck of the Nossa Senhora de Atalaia do Pinheiro	Type of site: Gun.	East London	East London	Heritage Object		Upload Photo
9/2/026/0007-003	Bronze cannon, salvaged from the wreck of the Nossa Senhora de Atalaia do Pinheiro	Type of site: Gun.	East London	East London	Heritage Object		Upload Photo
9/2/026/0009	West Bank Post Office, Bank Street, East London	Type of site: Post Office.	East London, West Bank	East London	Provincial Heritage Site	33°01′53″S 27°54′36″E	Type of site: Post Office.
9/2/026/0010	Old Powder Magazine, Fort Glamorgan, East London	The powder magazine of Fort Glamorgan nestles against the hill on the west bank of the Buffalo River, overlooking the harbour of East London. The Seventh Xhosa War, also known as the War of the Axe, broke out in 1846. Type of site: Powder Magazine.	East London, West Bank	East London	Provincial Heritage Site	33°01′58″S 27°53′49″E	Upload Photo
9/2/026/0011	Lower Needs Camp, East London District	Upper and Lower Need’s Camp are two lime quarries beside the main road from King William’s Town to East London. Upper Need’s Camp lies on a hill just within the Divisional boundary of King William’s Town.		East London	Provincial Heritage Site	33°00′50″S 27°39′00″E	Upload Photo
9/2/026/0012	Queens Park, Beaconsfield Road, East London	The original part of Queen's Park was donated to the inhabitants at East London in about 1880 by Mr Gately for use as a public park. This park is of particular botanical interest.	East London, CBD	East London	Provincial Heritage Site	33°57′35″S 25°36′14″E	The original part of Queen's Park was donated to the inhabitants at East London in about 1880 by Mr Gately for use as a public park. This park is of particular botanical interest.
9/2/026/0013	Cuthbert's Building, 110 Oxford Street, East London	Three storied plus rooms in roof space. Plastered brickwork structural iron framing with wood floors. The imposing treble-storeyed building, with its Flemish Renaissance gables, was designed by the architects Parker and Forsyth of Cape Town and erected in 1901 under the supervision of J. Pender West, of the same firm, for W.M. Cuthbert. Architectural style: Victorian neo-classic. Current use: Offices over shops.	East London, CBD	East London	Provincial Heritage Site	32°00′54″S 27°54′12″E	Three storied plus rooms in roof space. Plastered brickwork structural iron framing with wood floors. The imposing treble-storeyed building, with its Flemish Renaissance gables, was designed by the architects Parker and Forsyth of Cape Town and erected in 1901 under the supervision of J. Pender West, of the same firm, for W.M. Cuthbert. Architectural style: Victorian neo-classic. Current use: Offices over shops.
9/2/026/0014	Old Public Library, Argyle Street, East London	Single storied plastered brick. Corrugated iron pitched roofing behind parapets. Doors and windows – wood/iron. Special feature: Doric column portico. Architectural style: Neo-classical. Type of site: Library Current use: Offices and conference room. These three buildings, with their Victorian, neo-classical and Renaissance features, form an integral part of the historical and architectural core of East London. Moreover, each of these buildings can, in its own right, be described as unique.	East London, CBD	East London	Provincial Heritage Site	33°00′51″S 27°54′18″E	Single storied plastered brick. Corrugated iron pitched roofing behind parapets. Doors and windows – wood/iron. Special feature: Doric column portico. Architectural style: Neo-classical. Type of site: Library Current use: Offices and conference room. These three buildings, with their Victorian, neo-classical and Renaissance features, form an integral part of the historical and architectural core of East London. Moreover, each of these buildings can, in its own right, be described as unique.
9/2/026/0015	Ann Bryant Art Gallery, St Lukes Road, East London	These three buildings, with their Victorian, neo-classical and Renaissance features, form an integral part of the historical and architectural core of East London. Moreover, each of these buildings can, in its own right, be described as unique.	East London	East London	Provincial Heritage Site	33°00′03″S 27°53′51″E	These three buildings, with their Victorian, neo-classical and Renaissance features, form an integral part of the historical and architectural core of East London. Moreover, each of these buildings can, in its own right, be described as unique.
9/2/026/0016	Old Standard Bank Building, 64 Terminus Street, East London	The Provincial Building which was originally the old Standard Bank Building, is a fine example of Neo-Renaissance revivalism which covers an area of 1222 square metres and is situated on a very prominent corner site. It was erected in two stages. The original portion of this double-storeyed building which was situated in Terminus Street, was erected in 1900 on Lot No. 11. The property was then occupied as regional branch for the Standard Bank of South Africa. In 1926 it decided to extend and the building extended onto Lot 12 in 1927. Architectural style: Classical. Type of site: Bank Current use: Office building.	East London, CBD	East London	Provincial Heritage Site	33°01′01″S 27°54′21″E	The Provincial Building which was originally the old Standard Bank Building, is a fine example of Neo-Renaissance revivalism which covers an area of 1222 square metres and is situated on a very prominent corner site. It was erected in two stages. The original portion of this double-storeyed building which was situated in Terminus Street, was erected in 1900 on Lot No. 11. The property was then occupied as regional branch for the Standard Bank of South Africa. In 1926 it decided to extend and the building extended onto Lot 12 in 1927. Architectural style: Classical. Type of site: Bank Current use: Office building.
9/2/026/0017	Wool Exchange Building, Rhodes University, 50 Church Street, East London	Double storied – brick walling plastered. Pitched roof/Gables. Doors and windows – Hardwood. Decorative boundary walls. Original use: Wool Exchange – 1929. Architectural style: Classical. Type of site: University. Current use: University Administration and Lecture.	East London, CBD	East London	Provincial Heritage Site	33°01′13″S 27°54′25″E	Double storied – brick walling plastered. Pitched roof/Gables. Doors and windows – Hardwood. Decorative boundary walls. Original use: Wool Exchange – 1929. Architectural style: Classical. Type of site: University. Current use: University Administration and Lecture.
9/2/026/0028	Red House, Red House Avenue, East London	The Redhouse is a fine example of a Mediterranean type mansion from the second decade of this century. It is an imposing and aesthetically pleasing building that would stand proud in any centre.	East London, Vincent	East London	Provincial Heritage Site	32°59′01″S 27°55′00″E	Upload Photo
9/2/026/0031	Hood Point Lighthouse, East London	Type of site: Lighthouse Current use: Lighthouse. The Hood Point Lighthouse is a fine example of its type and has performed sterling service continually for one hundred years.	East London, West Bank	East London	Provincial Heritage Site	33°02′26″S 27°53′55″E	Type of site: Lighthouse Current use: Lighthouse. The Hood Point Lighthouse is a fine example of its type and has performed sterling service continually for one hundred years.
9/2/026/0032	Cambridge Primary School, Brabant Street, East London	Type of site: School Current use: School. The Cambridge Preparatory School, one of the earliest educational institutions still extant in East London, was the first school to be erected in the municipality of Cambridge. The school still serves the same function and remains in good condition.	East London, Cambridge	East London	Register	32°58′27″S 27°53′13″E	Upload Photo
9/2/026/0034	Customs and Excise Building, East London	.	East London	East London	Provincial Heritage Site	33°01′22″S 27°54′24″E	Upload Photo
9/2/026/0035	West Bank High School, Hood Street, East London	Type of site: School.	East London, West Bank	East London	Register	33°02′04″S 27°54′21″E	Upload Photo
9/2/028/0004	Post Retief, Fort Beaufort District	Post Retief was designed by Major C. Selwyn and built, in 1836 to protect the Winterberg District. The farm on which this fort is situated originally belonged to the Voortrekker leader Piet Retief and sections of the old walls of the Retief home are included. Type of site: Military.	Fort Beaufort	Fort Beaufort	Provincial Heritage Site	32°41′13″S 26°18′47″E	Upload Photo
9/2/028/0006	Fort Beaufort Museum, 44 Durban Street, Fort Beaufort	The historic Officers' Mess dates from about 1830 and is one of the oldest existing buildings in Fort Beaufort. It is closely linked with the history of the town as well as with the military history of the Eastern Cape. Type of site: Officers' Mess Current use: Museum.	Fort Beaufort	Fort Beaufort	Provincial Heritage Site	32°46′42″S 26°37′50″E	The historic Officers' Mess dates from about 1830 and is one of the oldest existing buildings in Fort Beaufort. It is closely linked with the history of the town as well as with the military history of the Eastern Cape. Type of site: Officers' Mess Current use: Museum. Media related to Fort Beaufort Museum at Wikimedia Commons
9/2/028/0007	Old Watermill, Mill Bank, Fort Beaufort District	Type of site: Water Mill.		Fort Beaufort	Provincial Heritage Site	32°44′50″S 26°35′55″E	Upload Photo
9/2/028/0009	Victoria Bridge, Bridge Street, Fort Beaufort	This bridge carries the Queen's Road, at that time an important military road, across the Kat River, It was designed by Major C. J. Selwyn, R.E., and completed towards the end of 1843 or early in 1844. Type of site: Bridge. Current use: Bridge.	Fort Beaufort	Fort Beaufort	Provincial Heritage Site	32°47′00″S 26°37′26″E	This bridge carries the Queen's Road, at that time an important military road, across the Kat River, It was designed by Major C. J. Selwyn, R.E., and completed towards the end of 1843 or early in 1844. Type of site: Bridge. Current use: Bridge.
9/2/028/0010	Old Military Hospital, Bell Street, Fort Beaufort	This U-shaped hospital building, which was erected shortly before the Seventh Frontier War (1846-1847), was designed by Captain J. E. Walpole of the Royal Engineers. In the 1870s the British Army vacated the premises. Type of site: Hospital Current use: Stores.	Fort Beaufort	Fort Beaufort	Provincial Heritage Site	32°46′49″S 26°37′59″E	Upload Photo
9/2/028/0011	Military Museum, 20 Bell Street, Fort Beaufort	The Officers' Quarters, Fort Beaufort, were built in 1849. Together with the neighbouring Martello tower, the officers' Quarters form a unique historical and architectural group which is extremely worthy of preservation. Current use: Museum.	Fort Beaufort	Fort Beaufort	Provincial Heritage Site	32°46′44″S 26°38′07″E	The Officers' Quarters, Fort Beaufort, were built in 1849. Together with the neighbouring Martello tower, the officers' Quarters form a unique historical and architectural group which is extremely worthy of preservation. Current use: Museum.
9/2/028/0012	Martello Tower, 20 Bell Street, Fort Beaufort	Fort Beaufort is situated in a bend of the Kat River and owes its origin to the establishment of a military post there in 1822 by Colonel Scott, mainly for the purpose of countering continual raids by Makomo. Type of site: Martello Tower. Current use: Museum.	Fort Beaufort	Fort Beaufort	Provincial Heritage Site	32°46′44″S 26°38′07″E	Fort Beaufort is situated in a bend of the Kat River and owes its origin to the establishment of a military post there in 1822 by Colonel Scott, mainly for the purpose of countering continual raids by Makomo. Type of site: Martello Tower. Current use: Museum.
9/2/028/0013	St John's Church, Post Retief, Fort Beaufort District	Type of site: Church.	Fort Beaufort	Fort Beaufort	Provincial Heritage Site	32°18′19″S 26°18′59″E	Upload Photo
9/2/028/0016	Sundial, Fort Beaufort Museum, 44 Durban Street, Fort Beaufort	The village of Seymour, also on the Kat River, lies barely 11 km east of Balfour and not far from Fort Armstrong. It too owes its origin to a military post, namely Eland’s Post. Type of site: Sundial.	Fort Beaufort	Fort Beaufort	Heritage Object	32°46′38″S 26°37′47″E	Upload Photo
9/2/028/0019	Sipton Manor, Fort Beaufort District	.	Fort Beaufort	Fort Beaufort	Provisional Protection	32°47′11″S 26°31′12″E	Upload Photo
9/2/034/0003	Irrigation tunnel, Hankey District	At first irrigation-furrows leading from the Klein River were dug to irrigate the fields in the immediate vicinity of Hankey, but William Philip had a far more ambitious plan in mind. Type of site: Tunnel. The old irrigation tunnel and the water furrow are a notable engineering work of the pioneer farmers under the guidance of the Rev. William Philip. They were completed in 1844.	Hankey	Hankey	Provincial Heritage Site	33°49′18″S 24°50′53″E	Upload Photo
9/2/034/0004	Sarah Baartmann Site, R331Hankey, Kouga Municipality	The site has spiritual, cultural, social, and historical significance. The treatment of Sarah Baartman during her life and after her death speaks of suffering, dispossession, sadness and loss of dignity, culture, community, language and life.	Hankey	Hankey	National Heritage Site	33°50′13″S 24°53′05″E	The site has spiritual, cultural, social, and historical significance. The treatment of Sarah Baartman during her life and after her death speaks of suffering, dispossession, sadness and loss of dignity, culture, community, language and life.
9/2/041/0003	Magistrate's Court and Post Office, Hofmeyr	Type of site: Courthouse and Post Office.	Hofmeyr	Hofmeyr	Provincial Heritage Site	31°39′12″S 25°48′13″E	Type of site: Courthouse and Post Office.
9/2/044/0004	Seal Point Lighthouse, Cape St Francis, Humansdorp District	The Cape St Francis lighthouse, which is an 80 feet high cylindrical masonry structure which stands on a rock foundation, is one of the highest lighthouses in South Africa and is from a navigational point of view very important to shipping. Building commenced in 1876. Type of site: Lighthouse.		Humansdorp	Provincial Heritage Site	34°12′44″S 24°50′12″E	The Cape St Francis lighthouse, which is an 80 feet high cylindrical masonry structure which stands on a rock foundation, is one of the highest lighthouses in South Africa and is from a navigational point of view very important to shipping. Building commenced in 1876. Type of site: Lighthouse. Media related to Seal Point Lighthouse at Wikimedia Commons
9/2/044/0006	Moravian Mission Complex, Clarkson, Humansdorp District	Type of site: Mission Station.	Clarkson	Humansdorp	Provincial Heritage Site	34°00′36″S 24°20′48″E	Upload Photo
9/2/044/0006-001	Church, Moravian Mission Complex, Clarkson, Humansdorp District	Type of site: Church.	Clarkson	Humansdorp	Provincial Heritage Site	34°00′36″S 24°20′48″E	Upload Photo
9/2/044/0006-002	Parsonage, Moravian Mission Complex, Clarkson, Humansdorp District	Type of site: Parsonage.	Clarkson	Humansdorp	Provincial Heritage Site	34°00′36″S 24°20′48″E	Upload Photo
9/2/044/0006-003	School, Moravian Mission Complex, Clarkson, Humansdorp District	Type of site: School.	Clarkson	Humansdorp	Provisional Protection	34°00′36″S 24°20′48″E	Upload Photo
9/2/044/0006-004	Church offices, Moravian Mission Complex, Clarkson, Humansdorp District	Type of site: Church Offices.	Clarkson	Humansdorp	Provincial Heritage Site	34°00′36″S 24°20′48″E	Upload Photo
9/2/044/0006-005	Mission store, Moravian Mission Complex, Clarkson, Humansdorp District	Type of site: Shop.	Clarkson	Humansdorp	Provincial Heritage Site	34°00′36″S 24°20′48″E	Upload Photo
9/2/044/0006-006	Cemetery, Moravian Mission Complex, Clarkson, Humansdorp District	Type of site: Cemetery.	Clarkson	Humansdorp	Provincial Heritage Site	34°00′36″S 24°20′48″E	Upload Photo
9/2/044/0006-007	Memorial to Pastor Nauhaus, Moravian Mission Complex, Clarkson, Humansdorp District	Type of site: Memorial.	Clarkson	Humansdorp	Provincial Heritage Site	34°00′36″S 24°20′48″E	Upload Photo
9/2/044/0006-008	Church bell, Moravian Mission Complex, Clarkson, Humansdorp District	Type of site: Bell.	Clarkson	Humansdorp	Provincial Heritage Site	34°00′36″S 24°20′48″E	Upload Photo
9/2/044/0007	School, Moravian Mission, Thornham, Humansdorp District	Type of site: School. The old school at Thornham is one of the oldest structures in the area and despite its basic simplicity, is worthy of recognition.	Humansdorp	Humansdorp	Register	34°01′59″S 24°45′58″E	Upload Photo
9/2/045/0005	Dutch Reformed Church, Voortrekker Street, Indwe	Type of site: Church Current use: Church : Dutch Reformed. The Dutch Reformed Church in Indwe is one of the last large sandstone churches to be erected in the North Eastern Cape. It holds a very prominent position within the town itself.	Indwe	Indwe	Register	31°28′02″S 27°20′20″E	Type of site: Church Current use: Church : Dutch Reformed. The Dutch Reformed Church in Indwe is one of the last large sandstone churches to be erected in the North Eastern Cape. It holds a very prominent position within the town itself.
9/2/046/0007	Dutch Reformed Church, 23 Main Street, Jansenville	Type of site: Church.	Jansenville	Jansenville	Provincial Heritage Site	32°56′37″S 24°39′50″E	Type of site: Church.
9/2/050/0004	5 Hood Street, King William's Town	It is a picturesque, solidly-constructed small double-storey residence of stone and brick, strongly resembling an eighteenth-century English farmhouse. The building has several unusual features which make it of special architectural interest. These feature The Military Reserve complex was largely built by the Imperial Government on the east bank of the Buffalo River during the years 1848-1866. During those years King William's Town was the most important town on the Frontier and also served as capital of Br. This mid-nineteenth-century double-storey house is closely associated with the military history of King William's Town at a stage when the town was at the centre of the Frontier Wars. The neo-Gothic windows and Victorian wooden balcony are particularly notable.	King William's Town	King William's Town	Provincial Heritage Site	32°52′11″S 27°23′14″E	Upload Photo
9/2/050/0005	Von Ronow House and Moser Cottage, Berlin, King William's Town District	Both the historic houses on this site are typical pioneer houses of the German Settlers who settled in the Eastern Province in the 1850s.	King William's Town	King William's Town	Provincial Heritage Site	32°51′19″S 27°35′11″E	Upload Photo
9/2/050/0006	Brownlee Congregational Church, Reserve Road, King William's Town	This building was erected in 1860 by the Rev. John Brownlee, missionary and founder of King William’s Town. Type of site: Church Current use: Church. This building was erected in 1860 by the Rev. John Brownlee, missionary and founder of King William's Town.	King William's Town	King William's Town	Provincial Heritage Site	32°51′51″S 27°32′48″E	Upload Photo
9/2/050/0007	Old Residency, Reserve Road, King William's Town	Single-storey building, built with stone and plastered brick under thatch roof. Windows are sash windows with timber louvre shutters. The floors are yellowwood timber flooring and concrete. The historic Residency was erected around 1846 and is situated on the spot where the London Missionary Society’s mission station was built by John Brownlee after his arrival in 1826. This building is closely linked to the history of King William's Town. Type of site: Residency Previous use: Vacant. Current use: Vacant.	King William's Town, King William's Town	King William's Town	Provincial Heritage Site	32°57′48″S 27°27′45″E	Single-storey building, built with stone and plastered brick under thatch roof. Windows are sash windows with timber louvre shutters. The floors are yellowwood timber flooring and concrete. The historic Residency was erected around 1846 and is situated on the spot where the London Missionary Society’s mission station was built by John Brownlee after his arrival in 1826. This building is closely linked to the history of King William's Town. Type of site: Residency Previous use: Vacant. Current use: Vacant.
9/2/050/0008	Holy Trinity Church, Prince Alfred's Square, King William's Town	ASYMMETRICAL PLAN BELOW A STEEP RIDGED, PITCHED, PARAPET GABLED ROOF WITH SQUAT TOWER ADJACENT TO CHURCH. AT THE GABLE END FACING THE STREET A VARIETY OF SMALLER GABLE ENDED PARTS HAVE BEEN ADDED TO THE CHURCH. Type of site: Church Current use: Anglican Church.	King William's Town	King William's Town	Provincial Heritage Site	32°59′20″S 27°28′33″E	Upload Photo
9/2/050/0009	Sun Building, Alexandra Road, King William's Town	Asymmetrical, double storey, L-shaped plan under ridged, pitched and hipped roof. Entry at corner marked by ornate tower with a copper dome. Fenestration makes use of nine-pane casement windows, nine-pane middle-swing windows and stained glass windows. Type of site: Commercial Current use: Financial Institution.	King William's Town	King William's Town	Provincial Heritage Site	32°52′38″S 27°23′28″E	Upload Photo
9/2/050/0010/002	Old Powder Magazine, Military Reserve, King William's Town	TWO SQUARE PLANNED BUILDINGS BELOW A RIDGED AND PITCHED GABLED BUILDING WITH NARROW SLITS IN THE WALLS AND HIDDEN TIMBER DOORS. THE TWO BUILDINGS ARE COMPLETELY SURROUNDED WITH HIGH STONE WALLS. EACH BUILDING STANDS IN ITS OWN COURTYARD. This powder magazine is one of the largest and best preserved examples of its kind in South Africa. It was probably erected in two stages, namely between 1852 and 1862 and between 1864 and 1875. Type of site: Powder Magazine.	King William's Town	King William's Town	Provincial Heritage Site	32°57′48″S 27°27′45″E	Upload Photo
9/2/050/0010/003	Old Commissariat Store, Military Reserve, King William's Town	This L-shaped stone building was completed in 1849, shortly before the outbreak of the Eighth Frontier War (1850-1853). It was also used in times of peace, for example to store corn in 1857 during the so-called Xhosa Suicide.	King William's Town	King William's Town	Provincial Heritage Site	32°57′48″S 27°27′45″E	Upload Photo
9/2/050/0010/004	Old Officers' Mess, Military Reserve, King William's Town	This U-shaped building was erected largely in 1849 as an Officers' Mess at a time when King William's Town formed the centre of the Frontier Wars and accommodated a large garrison. The building was used as a mess until 1884. Type of site: Mess.	King William's Town	King William's Town	Provincial Heritage Site	32°57′48″S 27°27′45″E	Upload Photo
9/2/050/0011	Stead Wing, Kaffrarian Museum, Alexandra Road, King William's Town	SQUARE SHAPED BUILDING WITH INTERIOR COURTYARD BELOW A RIDGED AND HIPPED ROOF WITH 3 CHIMNEY STACKS VISIBLE. THE STRAIGHT ROOFED FRONT VERANDAH IS SUPPORTED BY TIMBER COLUMNSON A STONE BASE AND FINISHED OFF WITH CAST IRON BALUSTRADES. THE ENTRANCE IS FO This building was first occupied in 1877 and accommodated various Government departments. The building has an imposing clock tower with a memorial clock, which was installed in memory of John Brownlee, first missionary and founder of King William's Town. Type of site: House Current use: Private house.	King William's Town	King William's Town	Provincial Heritage Site	32°52′39″S 27°23′30″E	SQUARE SHAPED BUILDING WITH INTERIOR COURTYARD BELOW A RIDGED AND HIPPED ROOF WITH 3 CHIMNEY STACKS VISIBLE. THE STRAIGHT ROOFED FRONT VERANDAH IS SUPPORTED BY TIMBER COLUMNSON A STONE BASE AND FINISHED OFF WITH CAST IRON BALUSTRADES. THE ENTRANCE IS FO This building was first occupied in 1877 and accommodated various Government departments. The building has an imposing clock tower with a memorial clock, which was installed in memory of John Brownlee, first missionary and founder of King William's Town. Type of site: House Current use: Private house.
9/2/050/0012	Magistrate's Court, Alexandra Road, King William's Town	SYMMETRICAL PLAN BELOW A RIDGED AND HIPPED ROOF WITH A CENTRAL, 3 ARCHED, DOUBLE VOLUME ENTRANCE PORCH WITH AN ORNATE CLOCK TOWER ABOVE IT. FENESTRATION MAKES USE OF 4 PANE SASH WINDOWS WITH RAISED PLASTER SURROUNDS AND ARCHED FANLIGHTS. THE CENTRAL ENT This building was first occupied in 1877 and accommodated various Government departments. The building has an imposing clock tower with a memorial clock, which was installed in memory of John Brownlee, first missionary and founder of King William's Town. Type of site: Courthouse. Current use: Magistrate's Court.	King William's Town	King William's Town	Provincial Heritage Site	33°03′00″S 27°31′25″E	SYMMETRICAL PLAN BELOW A RIDGED AND HIPPED ROOF WITH A CENTRAL, 3 ARCHED, DOUBLE VOLUME ENTRANCE PORCH WITH AN ORNATE CLOCK TOWER ABOVE IT. FENESTRATION MAKES USE OF 4 PANE SASH WINDOWS WITH RAISED PLASTER SURROUNDS AND ARCHED FANLIGHTS. THE CENTRAL ENT This building was first occupied in 1877 and accommodated various Government departments. The building has an imposing clock tower with a memorial clock, which was installed in memory of John Brownlee, first missionary and founder of King William's Town. Type of site: Courthouse. Current use: Magistrate's Court.
9/2/050/0013	Deeds Office, Alexandra Road, King William's Town	SYMMETRICAL, U-SHAPED PLAN BELOW A RIDGED AND HIPPED ROOF WITH A CENTRAL ENTRANCE. FENESTRATION MAKES USE OF 12 PANE CASEMENT WINDOWS WITH 10 PANE STRAIGHT FANLIGHTS. ORNATE CORNICE BELOW GUTTER AND 2 HIGH CHIMNEY STACKS VISIBLE ON THE ROOF. Type of site: Commercial Current use: Deeds Offices.	King William's Town	King William's Town	Provincial Heritage Site	33°03′27″S 27°31′25″E	Upload Photo
9/2/050/0014/001	Daines Wing, Kaffrarian Museum, Alexandra Road, King William's Town	DOUBLE STOREY ELONGATED PLAN BELOW A RIDGED AND GABLED ROOF WITH THE ENTRANCE IN THE GABLE. ENTRANCE IS ENHANCED BY HEAVY COLUMNS AND PLASTER MOULDINGS. COLUMNS SUPPORT A VERY HEAVY PEDIMENT. FENESTRATION MAKES USE OF 2 PANE CASEMENT WINDOWS WITH RAISE The Kaffrarian Museum originated from the Natural History Society, which was founded in King William's Town in 1884. The original museum building, which was designed by the architect P. E. Treeby of Johannesburg and opened by Mrs James Weir Type of site: Community Current use: Museum.	King William's Town	King William's Town	Provincial Heritage Site	32°52′37″S 27°23′29″E	Upload Photo
9/2/050/0014/002	Natural History Wing, Kaffrarian Museum, Albert Road, King William's Town	Elongated plan below ridged and parapet gabled roof with ornate entrance gable on side of the building. Timber double doors from the entrance and is decorated with plaster moulding surrounds. Fenestration makes use of large 12 pane arched windows. Type of site: Community. Current use: Museum of Natural History.	King William's Town	King William's Town	Provincial Heritage Site	32°52′36″S 27°23′32″E	Upload Photo
9/2/050/0015	Lonsdale Chambers, Taylor Street, King William's Town	This double-storey building with its predominantly neo-Classical features was designed and built in 1924 by the architects Cordreaux, Farrow and Stocks. The building was named after James Faunce Lonsdale	King William's Town	King William's Town	Provincial Heritage Site	32°52′42″S 27°23′24″E	Upload Photo
9/2/050/0016	British Kaffrarian Savings Bank, MacLean Square, King William's Town	The British Kaffrarian Savings Bank building was erected in 1908. It is an architecturally interesting building which portrays the architecture of the period 1900-1910. It also lends character to Maclean Square on which it is situated. Type of site: Bank Current use: Nedbank.	King William's Town	King William's Town	Provincial Heritage Site	32°52′43″S 27°23′23″E	The British Kaffrarian Savings Bank building was erected in 1908. It is an architecturally interesting building which portrays the architecture of the period 1900-1910. It also lends character to Maclean Square on which it is situated. Type of site: Bank Current use: Nedbank.
9/2/050/0017	Old Railway station, Alexandra Road, King William's Town	The building is a simple elongated rectangle in shape and is remarkable for the magnificent stonework, two varieties having been used, for walling and window and door surrounds respectively. The interior has been altered to suit the present use. The exterior. This stone building was officially opened as a railway station on 1 May 1877. After the relocation it was acquired in 1933 by the De Vos Malan Primary School. The building is now used as School Board offices. Type of site: Railway station. Current use: Public Service Commission.	King William's Town	King William's Town	Provincial Heritage Site	33°06′09″S 27°33′36″E	Upload Photo
9/2/050/0018	Victoria Drill Hall, Queens Road, King William's Town	This Victorian building with its neo-Classical features was designed by J. Laughton and was named after Queen Victoria to commemorate her sixtieth year as Queen of the British Empire. The cornerstone of the building was laid on 21 June 1897. Type of site: Drill Hall.	King William's Town	King William's Town	Provincial Heritage Site	32°52′39″S 27°23′34″E	Upload Photo
9/2/050/0019	Sutton House, Queens Road, King William's Town	The corner-stone of Sutton House was laid on 6 September 1877 by the Governor of the Cape Colony, Sir Henry Bartle Frere. The building was officially opened on 17 December 1878 and named after the Rev. J. G. Sutton, Headmaster of Dale College from 1890. Current use: Hutton & Cook Attorney, Old Mutual Offices, AW Administrators & The Rock (pub).	King William's Town	King William's Town	Provincial Heritage Site	33°02′51″S 27°33′11″E	Upload Photo
9/2/050/0021	Old Royal Engineers Officers' Mess, Reserve Road, King William's Town	Type of site: Mess.	King William's Town	King William's Town	Provincial Heritage Site	32°57′48″S 27°27′45″E	Upload Photo
9/2/050/0022	Old Blacksmiths shop, Oak Street, King William's Town	Type of site: Blacksmith Current use: Correctional Services: Logistics.	King William's Town	King William's Town	Provincial Heritage Site	32°57′13″S 27°26′44″E	Upload Photo
9/2/050/0023	Old Military Hospital, King William's Town	Type of site: House.	King William's Town	King William's Town	Provincial Heritage Site	32°57′48″S 27°27′45″E	Upload Photo
9/2/050/0024	Dale College Boys' Primary School, Albert Road, King William's Town	SYMMETRICAL PLAN BELOW RIDGED, PITCHED, GABLED AND HIPPED ROOFS. THE CENTRAL ENTRANCE BLOCK IS DOUBLE STOREY AND A SMALL LEAN-TO ROOF FORMS THE ENTRANCE. AT THE SIDES OF THE ENTRANCE ARE VERANDAH'S WITH ARCHED COLLONNADES IN FRONT OF THEM. THE WINDOWS The cornerstone of this imposing red brick building, designed by the well-known architect Sir Herbert Baker, was laid on 20 March 1907. The building was officially opened on 26 February 1908 by Dr Thomas Muir, Superintendent-General of Education. Type of site: School. Current use: School.	King William's Town	King William's Town	Provincial Heritage Site	32°52′34″S 27°23′35″E	Upload Photo
9/2/050/0025	Town Hall, MacLean Street, King William's Town	The foundation stone of this imposing City Hall was laid in 1866. This stone building was officially opened on 4 December 1867 and during the Ninth Frontier War (1877-1878) it was used as a waiting-room for the Civil Defence Force. Type of site: Town Hall.	King William's Town	King William's Town	Provincial Heritage Site	32°52′38″S 27°23′19″E	Upload Photo
9/2/050/0026	Grey Hospital, King William's Town	The Grey Hospital was erected between 1856 and 1859 at the instance of Sir George Grey and intended mainly for the Black population of the former British Kaffraria. The hospital was designed by Edward Pilkington and opened on 11 June 1859. Type of site: Hospital.	King William's Town	King William's Town	Provincial Heritage Site	32°52′47″S 27°23′39″E	Upload Photo
9/2/050/0027	South African Missionary Museum, Berkley Street, King William's Town	ELONGATED, SYMMETRICAL PLAN BELOW RIDGED AND PARAPET GABLED ROOF. THE ENTRANCE IS SITUATED IN THE GABLE WHICH IS ORNATELY DETAILED WITH BUTTRESSES, LARGE POINTED ARCH WINDOWS AND A VENTILATOR. THE TIMBER ENTRANCE DOOR IS ALSO POINTED ARCHED AND HAS A RAI This historic Methodist Church at King William's Town was built in 1855 in the neo-Gothic style. It was later used by the local German Baptist Congregation and is now the home of the South African Missionary Museum. Type of site: Church, Museum Current use: Mission Church.	King William's Town	King William's Town	Provincial Heritage Site	32°52′26″S 27°23′15″E	ELONGATED, SYMMETRICAL PLAN BELOW RIDGED AND PARAPET GABLED ROOF. THE ENTRANCE IS SITUATED IN THE GABLE WHICH IS ORNATELY DETAILED WITH BUTTRESSES, LARGE POINTED ARCH WINDOWS AND A VENTILATOR. THE TIMBER ENTRANCE DOOR IS ALSO POINTED ARCHED AND HAS A RAI This historic Methodist Church at King William's Town was built in 1855 in the neo-Gothic style. It was later used by the local German Baptist Congregation and is now the home of the South African Missionary Museum. Type of site: Church, Museum Current use: Mission Church.
9/2/050/0028	Old Methodist Manse, 25 Berkley Street, King William's Town	DOUBLE STOREY, ELONGATED PLAN BELOW A RIDGED AND PARAPET GABLED ROOF. THE VERANDAH ON THE FRONT OF THE HOUSE IS CONCAVELY ROOFED AND SUPPORTED BY TIMBER COLUMNS WITH CAPITALS AND BALUSTRADES. FENNESTRATION MAKES USE OF 18 PANE SASH WINDOWS. The old Methodist manse was built in approximately 1855. It is a simple, double-storeyed building with a corrugated iron roof and a wooden balcony which stretches from one side of the front facade to the other. Type of site: Parsonage. Current use: Private home.	King William's Town	King William's Town	Provincial Heritage Site	32°52′25″S 27°23′17″E	Upload Photo
9/2/050/0029	Old Synagogue, Berkley Street, King William's Town	ELONGATED PLAN BELOW RIDGED AND PARAPET GABLED ROOF WITH A CENTRAL ENTRANCE IN THE GABLE. THE GALE IS SEMI-CIRCULAR IN FORM AND DECORATED WITH ORNATE PLASTER MOULDINGS. FENESTRATION MAKES USE OF 4 PANE CASEMENT WINDOWS WITH TRIANGULAR FANLIGHTS. This predominantly neo-Gothic building probably dates from the eighteen-fifties and was used for several decades as a school by the Wesleyans. The building has been used as a synagogue since 1908. Type of site: Synagogue. Current use: Synagogue.	King William's Town	King William's Town	Provincial Heritage Site	32°52′27″S 27°23′14″E	Upload Photo
9/2/050/0036	Lutheran Church complex, Braunschweig	This Lutheran Church complex consisting of the neo-Gothic church building of 1904, the parsonage of 1860 and the school building of 1860 and extension of 1904, is closely associated with the arrival of the German Legion in 1857. Type of site: Church Complex.	King William's Town	King William's Town	Provincial Heritage Site	32°47′10″S 27°22′12″E	Upload Photo
9/2/050/0038	Steve Biko's House, 698 Ngxata Street, Ginsberg, King William's Town	.	King William's Town, Ginsberg	King William's Town	Provincial Heritage Site	32°53′41″S 27°23′12″E	.
9/2/050/0041	Upper Needs Camp, King William's Town District Cuylerville	Upper and Lower Need’s Camp are two lime quarries beside the main road from King William’s Town to East London. Upper Need’s Camp lies on a hill just within the Divisional boundary of King William’s Town. On the site there are geological deposits containing fossils dating back to the Cretaceous Period. It is the intention to preserve the deposits for future geological research.		King William's Town	Provincial Heritage Site	33°00′45″S 27°37′05″E	Upload Photo
9/2/051/0003	The Look Out, Kirkwood District	A portion of land with a raised brick platform, and an enclosed area with a few graves. The national road runs almost due north from Port Elizabeth, and where it veers north eastwards to Grahamstown a gravel road continues in a northerly direction to the Addo Elephant National Park. Located some 65 km from Port Elizabeth on the R336 traveling towards Kirkwood turning off at Sunlands and proceeding for ± 3-5km. The Lookout is a raised brick platform erected by Sir Percy Fitzpatrick (the well-known author of Jock in the Bushveld) in order to get a better view of the countryside below the hill.	Uitenhage	Kirkwood	Provincial Heritage Site	33°25′45″S 25°26′10″E	Upload Photo
9/2/053/0003	St Paul's Church, Komga	The original part of this church was completed in 1866 and was used as a temporary fort during the Ninth Frontier War (1877-78). The chancel was added in 1880 and the castellated tower early in the 20th century. Type of site: Church.	Komga	Komga	Provincial Heritage Site	32°41′35″S 28°00′29″E	Upload Photo
9/2/053/0004	Komga Public Library, 12 St Johns Street, Komga	This library building with its neo-Gothic features is one of the oldest buildings in the town and was erected in 1892 to meet the needs of the inhabitants of the village that grew around the military base, which was established here in 1877. Type of site: Library.	Komga	Komga	Provincial Heritage Site	32°42′21″S 28°00′08″E	Upload Photo
9/2/057/0004	Dutch Reformed Church, Joubert Street, Lady Grey	Type of site: Church Current use: Church : Dutch Reformed.	Lady Grey	Lady Grey	Provincial Heritage Site	30°42′38″S 27°13′09″E	Type of site: Church Current use: Church : Dutch Reformed.
9/2/059/0002-004	M.O.T.H. Building, Maclear	.	Maclear	Maclear	Register	31°04′02″S 28°20′43″E	Upload Photo
9/2/059/0003	Dinosaur Track Site, Oakleigh, Maclear District	Current use: Palaeontological site.	Maclear	Maclear	Provincial Heritage Site	30°58′11″S 28°15′54″E	Upload Photo
9/2/061/0004	Karel Theron Primary School, Victoria Street, Middelburg	Type of site: School.	Middelburg	Middelburg	Provincial Heritage Site	31°29′30″S 25°00′20″E	Upload Photo
9/2/061/0005	Reformed Church, Meintjies Street, Middelburg	This neo-Gothic church building was erected in the years 1861 to 1862, soon after the Reformed Church was established in 1859. It is the oldest Reformed church building in the Cape Province. Type of site: Church.	Middelburg	Middelburg	Provincial Heritage Site	31°29′46″S 25°00′21″E	This neo-Gothic church building was erected in the years 1861 to 1862, soon after the Reformed Church was established in 1859. It is the oldest Reformed church building in the Cape Province. Type of site: Church.
9/2/061/0006/001	P W Vorster Museum, Grootfontein Agricultural College, Middelburg District	Type of site: Museum Current use: Museum.	Middelburg	Middelburg	Provincial Heritage Site	31°28′18″S 25°01′40″E	Upload Photo
9/2/061/0006/002	Old Officers' Mess, Grootfontein Agricultural College, Middelburg District	Type of site: Mess.	Middelburg	Middelburg	Provincial Heritage Site	31°28′18″S 25°01′40″E	Upload Photo
9/2/061/0008	Haystead and Ford, 7 Market Street, Middelburg	.	Middelburg	Middelburg	Provincial Heritage Site	31°29′44″S 25°00′24″E	Upload Photo
9/2/062/0003	Magistrate's Court, Smith Street, Molteno	Type of site: Courthouse.	Molteno	Molteno	Provincial Heritage Site	31°23′50″S 26°21′47″E	Type of site: Courthouse.
9/2/070/0003	Old Residency, Rawson Street, Pearston	Type of site: Residency.	Pearston	Pearston	Provincial Heritage Site	32°35′00″S 25°08′10″E	Upload Photo
9/2/070/0004	Carl E Froelich's Shop, 58 Voortrekker Street, Pearston		Pearston	Pearston	Provincial Heritage Site	32°35′00″S 25°08′30″E	Upload Photo
9/2/077/0003	Hexagon, Komani	The Hexagon was originally laid out in the center of Komani (then Queenstown) for defence purposes, and has remained the focal point of the town plan. The idea of this hexagon shape originated with Commander T. H. Bowker.	Komani	Komani	Provincial Heritage Site	31°53′46″S 26°52′16″E	Upload Photo
9/2/077/0004	Old Municipal Market, 5 Hexagon, Komani	Type of site: Market.	Komani	Komani	Provincial Heritage Site	31°53′46″S 26°52′14″E	Upload Photo
9/2/077/0005	Town Hall, Cathcart Road, Komani	This sandstone building was designed by the architect Sidney Stent and erected by the builders Male and Kirton. The cornerstone was laid on 24 May 1882 by the wife of Mayor D. S. Barrable. Type of site: Town Hall.	Komani	Komani	Provincial Heritage Site	31°53′52″S 26°52′26″E	This sandstone building was designed by the architect Sidney Stent and erected by the builders Male and Kirton. The cornerstone was laid on 24 May 1882 by the wife of Mayor D. S. Barrable. Type of site: Town Hall.
9/2/077/0008	Museum, Naude Street, Komani	This building was originally erected in 1868 as a primary school. It is an outstanding example of a Victorian school building and is closely associated with the history of Komani. Current use: Museum.	Komani	Komani	Provincial Heritage Site	31°53′42″S 26°52′20″E	Upload Photo
9/2/077/0009	Queen's College, Berry Street, Komani	The original portion of the Queen's College building complex was designed in 1897 and the cornerstone of the main entrance building was laid on 15 September 1897. The school was extended in 1914 and again in 1919 and 1920. Cross bridge, continue up Peacock Road and then turn left into Berry Street.	Komani	Komani	Provincial Heritage Site	31°53′25″S 26°52′35″E	The original portion of the Queen's College building complex was designed in 1897 and the cornerstone of the main entrance building was laid on 15 September 1897. The school was extended in 1914 and again in 1919 and 1920. Cross bridge, continue up Peacock Road and then turn left into Berry Street.
9/2/082/0003	Old Hope Congregational Church and Parsonage, Paulet Street, KwaNojoli	The property on which the church complex is situated was bequeathed to the London Missionary Society in 1842 by Mrs Dorothy Edwards, widow of the Rev. John Evans of Cradock. The parsonage, which was built in the Victorian style, dates from the period 1825 Type of site: Church and Parsonage.	KwaNojoli	KwaNojoli	Provincial Heritage Site	32°42′53″S 25°35′08″E	The property on which the church complex is situated was bequeathed to the London Missionary Society in 1842 by Mrs Dorothy Edwards, widow of the Rev. John Evans of Cradock. The parsonage, which was built in the Victorian style, dates from the period 1825 Type of site: Church and Parsonage.
9/2/082/0003-001	Old Hope Congregational Church, Paulet Street, KwaNojoli	The property on which this church complex is situated was bequeathed to the London Missionary Society in 1842 by Mrs Dorothy Edwards, widow of the Rev. John Evans of Cradock. The parsonage, which was built in the Victorian style, dates from the period 1825. Type of site: Church.	KwaNojoli	KwaNojoli	Provincial Heritage Site	32°42′53″S 25°35′08″E	The property on which this church complex is situated was bequeathed to the London Missionary Society in 1842 by Mrs Dorothy Edwards, widow of the Rev. John Evans of Cradock. The parsonage, which was built in the Victorian style, dates from the period 1825. Type of site: Church.
9/2/082/0003-002	Old Congregational Church Parsonage, 64 Paulet Street, KwaNojoli	The property on which the church complex is situated was bequeathed to the London Missionary Society in 1842 by Mrs Dorothy Edwards, widow of the Rev. John Evans of Cradock. The parsonage, which was built in the Victorian style, dates from the period 1825. Type of site: Parsonage.	KwaNojoli	KwaNojoli	Provincial Heritage Site	32°42′53″S 25°35′08″E	The property on which the church complex is situated was bequeathed to the London Missionary Society in 1842 by Mrs Dorothy Edwards, widow of the Rev. John Evans of Cradock. The parsonage, which was built in the Victorian style, dates from the period 1825. Type of site: Parsonage.
9/2/082/0004	Ann's Villa, KwaNojoli District	.	KwaNojoli	KwaNojoli	Provisional Protection	33°15′14″S 25°46′22″E	. Media related to Ann's Villa at Wikimedia Commons
9/2/082/0005	Somerset East Museum, KwaNojoli	This double-storeyed Georgian building was erected about 1820 as the headquarters of the Somerset Experimental Farm. From 1825 to 1829 it was used as the Drostdy, after which it was transferred to the Wesleyan Church. Type of site: House. Current use: Museum.	KwaNojoli	KwaNojoli	Provincial Heritage Site	32°43′15″S 25°34′23″E	This double-storeyed Georgian building was erected about 1820 as the headquarters of the Somerset Experimental Farm. From 1825 to 1829 it was used as the Drostdy, after which it was transferred to the Wesleyan Church. Type of site: House. Current use: Museum.
9/2/082/0006	Dutch Reformed Church, Charles Street, KwaNojoli	The enlargement of this church, the original portions of which date from the Eighteen-thirties, was planned by Carl Otto Hager. He also supervised the building activities for 18 months. The rebuilt church is predominantly neo-Gothic in style. Architectural style: altered by Hager. Type of site: Church. Current use: Church.	KwaNojoli	KwaNojoli	Provincial Heritage Site	32°43′10″S 25°35′09″E	The enlargement of this church, the original portions of which date from the Eighteen-thirties, was planned by Carl Otto Hager. He also supervised the building activities for 18 months. The rebuilt church is predominantly neo-Gothic in style. Architectural style: altered by Hager. Type of site: Church. Current use: Church. Media related to Dutch Reformed Church, Somerset East at Wikimedia Commons
9/2/082/0007	Walter Battiss Art Museum, 45 Paulet Street, KwaNojoli	Double-storey rectangular plan with single-storey lean-to to 3/4 of rear. Pitched corrugated iron roof. Moulded surrounds to openings. Quoining to edges. Octagonal chimneys. Sets of two to ends and 4 to centre. Front door 6 (flush) panel. This Georgian double-storeyed building was originally erected in about 1815 by Lord Charles Somerset for officers and presumably also soldiers who were stationed on the Eastern Frontier. The Victorian veranda was added later. Type of site: House Previous use: Officers' Mess, Residence, Hotel. Current use: Art Museum.	KwaNojoli	KwaNojoli	Provincial Heritage Site	32°42′55″S 25°35′13″E	Double-storey rectangular plan with single-storey lean-to to 3/4 of rear. Pitched corrugated iron roof. Moulded surrounds to openings. Quoining to edges. Octagonal chimneys. Sets of two to ends and 4 to centre. Front door 6 (flush) panel. This Georgian double-storeyed building was originally erected in about 1815 by Lord Charles Somerset for officers and presumably also soldiers who were stationed on the Eastern Frontier. The Victorian veranda was added later. Type of site: House Previous use: Officers' Mess, Residence, Hotel. Current use: Art Museum. Media related to Walter Battiss Art Museum at Wikimedia Commons
9/2/082/0008	154 Nojoli Street, KwaNojoli	This property, which was granted to J. van Dyk on 1 September 1825, was one of the first lots to be allocated immediately after the founding of Somerset East on the old experimental farm of Lord Charles Somerset in 1825.	KwaNojoli	KwaNojoli	Provincial Heritage Site	32°43′10″S 25°34′47″E	This property, which was granted to J. van Dyk on 1 September 1825, was one of the first lots to be allocated immediately after the founding of Somerset East on the old experimental farm of Lord Charles Somerset in 1825.
9/2/082/0009	60 Paulet Street, KwaNojoli	These three properties, granted to Jan Jonathan Durandt, William MacDonald Mackay and Robert Robinson, respectively, were three of the first lots to be allocated immediately after the founding of Somerset East on the old experimental farm of Lord Charles.	KwaNojoli	KwaNojoli	Provincial Heritage Site	32°42′52″S 25°35′12″E	These three properties, granted to Jan Jonathan Durandt, William MacDonald Mackay and Robert Robinson, respectively, were three of the first lots to be allocated immediately after the founding of Somerset East on the old experimental farm of Lord Charles.
9/2/082/0010	62 Paulet Street, KwaNojoli	These three properties, granted to Jan Jonathan Durandt, William MacDonald Mackay and Robert Robinson, respectively, were three of the first lots to be allocated immediately after the founding of Somerset East on the old experimental farm of Lord Charles.	KwaNojoli	KwaNojoli	Provincial Heritage Site	32°42′52″S 25°35′10″E	These three properties, granted to Jan Jonathan Durandt, William MacDonald Mackay and Robert Robinson, respectively, were three of the first lots to be allocated immediately after the founding of Somerset East on the old experimental farm of Lord Charles.
9/2/082/0011	49 Paulet Street, KwaNojoli	These three properties, granted to Jan Jonathan Durandt, William MacDonald Mackay and Robert Robinson, respectively, were three of the first lots to be allocated immediately after the founding of Somerset East on the old experimental farm of Lord Charles.	KwaNojoli	KwaNojoli	Provincial Heritage Site	32°42′55″S 25°35′10″E	These three properties, granted to Jan Jonathan Durandt, William MacDonald Mackay and Robert Robinson, respectively, were three of the first lots to be allocated immediately after the founding of Somerset East on the old experimental farm of Lord Charles.
9/2/082/0012	107 Paulet Street, KwaNojoli	The core of this dwelling-house, which is predominantly in the Georgian style, presumably formed part of the original homestead of the old experimental farm of Lord Charles Somerset that was subdivided in 1825 and that formed the basis of the present Somerset East. Type of site: House. Current use: Dwelling.	KwaNojoli	KwaNojoli	Provincial Heritage Site	32°42′52″S 25°35′22″E	The core of this dwelling-house, which is predominantly in the Georgian style, presumably formed part of the original homestead of the old experimental farm of Lord Charles Somerset that was subdivided in 1825 and that formed the basis of the present Somerset East. Type of site: House. Current use: Dwelling.
9/2/082/0013-001	Old College Building, New Street, KwaNojoli	.	KwaNojoli	KwaNojoli	Provincial Heritage Site	32°43′19″S 25°34′44″E	.
9/2/082/0013-002	College House, Gill College, KwaNojoli		KwaNojoli	KwaNojoli	Provincial Heritage Site	32°43′19″S 25°35′17″E	
9/2/082/0014	Old Bellevue Seminary, 72 Paulet Street, KwaNojoli	Type of site: Seminary.	KwaNojoli	KwaNojoli	Provincial Heritage Site	32°42′52″S 25°35′22″E	Type of site: Seminary. Media related to Bellevue Seminary, KwaNojoli at Wikimedia Commons
9/2/086/0003	Bulhoek, Steynsburg District	The farm Bulhoek is situated about 20 km north of Steynsburg, at the foot of the Suurberg, on the road to Venterstad. This farm has acquired a certain degree of fame as the traditional birthplace of the illustrious President Paul Kruger. This pioneer house is one of the best existing examples of a typical trekboer house and dates from 1817. Elsie Steyn, President Kruger's mother grew up on this farm. Type of site: House.	Steynsburg	Steynsburg	Provincial Heritage Site	31°05′49″S 25°34′16″E	Upload Photo
9/2/087/0003	Dutch Reformed Church, Sarel Cilliers Street, Steytlerville	Type of site: Church.	Steytlerville	Steytlerville	Provincial Heritage Site	33°19′52″S 24°20′39″E	Type of site: Church.
9/2/087/0004	22 Victoria Road, Steytlerville	A somewhat unusual variation of a Karroo cottage, in that it does not have a flat roof. The building is in excellent condition.	Steytlerville	Steytlerville	Register	33°19′58″S 24°19′58″E	Upload Photo
9/2/090/0005	Bethel Mission Church, Stutterheim	It was founded by Pastor J. L. Dohne of the Berlin Missionary Society on 2 January 1837, and is the oldest mission station of that Society in the whole of the Eastern Province. Dohne was one of six Berlin missionaries who arrived at the Cape in 1836. Type of site: Church.	Stutterheim	Stutterheim	Provincial Heritage Site	32°33′42″S 27°26′02″E	It was founded by Pastor J. L. Dohne of the Berlin Missionary Society on 2 January 1837, and is the oldest mission station of that Society in the whole of the Eastern Province. Dohne was one of six Berlin missionaries who arrived at the Cape in 1836. Type of site: Church.
9/2/090/0006	Ganger's Cottage No 17, East London and Queenstown Railway, Stutterheim District	This fortified house is one of the few remaining examples of a series of similar structures which were built during the Frontier War of 1877-1878 to protect the railway line between East London and Toise River.	Stutterheim	Stutterheim	Provincial Heritage Site	32°33′47″S 27°26′06″E	This fortified house is one of the few remaining examples of a series of similar structures which were built during the Frontier War of 1877-1878 to protect the railway line between East London and Toise River.
9/2/090/0007	Baron von Stutterheim Mill, Stutterheim	This double-storeyed stone building, known as the Baron von Stutterheim Mill, was erected by Mr H. J. Adkins, official contractor of the British-German Legion military settlers, during the years 1860 to 1861 on the instruction of Baron Richard von Stutterheim. Type of site: Mill.	Stutterheim	Stutterheim	Provincial Heritage Site	32°34′03″S 27°24′58″E	Upload Photo
9/2/090/0010	Mgwali Mission complex, Stutterheim District	Type of site: Mission Station Current use: Church.	Mgwali	Stutterheim	Provincial Heritage Site	32°40′41″S 27°43′51″E	Upload Photo
9/2/090/0010-002	Manse, Mgwali Mission complex, Stutterheim District	Type of site: Parsonage. Current use: Minister's residence.	Mgwali	Stutterheim	Provincial Heritage Site	32°41′07″S 27°42′29″E	Upload Photo
9/2/090/0010-003	Original school, Mgwali Mission complex, Stutterheim District	Type of site: School Current use: Vacant.	Mgwali	Stutterheim	Provisional Protection	32°42′40″S 27°41′48″E	Upload Photo
9/2/090/0010-004	Old hostel, Mgwali Mission complex, Stutterheim District	Type of site: Hostel Current use: Vacant.	Mgwali	Stutterheim	Provisional Protection	32°41′45″S 27°40′51″E	Upload Photo
9/2/093/0003	Old Dutch Reformed Church Parsonage, 17 Grey Street, Tarkastad	This parsonage was built soon after the arrival of the Reverend J. G. S. de Villiers as the first Minister of Tarkastad in 1864. This double-storeyed building has a unique wrought-iron verandah. Type of site: Pastorie.	Tarkastad	Tarkastad	Provincial Heritage Site	32°00′30″S 26°15′59″E	Upload Photo
9/2/095/0002-304	Park Centre, 17 Upper Church Street, Uitenhage	Current use: Community. The Park Centre, formally Riebeeck College are amongst the oldest school buildings in Uitenhage and make up an important streetscape along a major thoroughfare in the town.	Uitenhage	Uitenhage	Register	33°45′53″S 25°24′04″E	Upload Photo
9/2/095/0004	Dutch Reformed Church Hall, 112 Caledon Street, Uitenhage	This fine building was designed in 1818 but completed only in 1843 and was the Dutch Reformed Church until it became a church hall in 1927. The establishment of a new magistracy was usually followed immediately by the establishment of a congregation. Type of site: Church Hall.	Uitenhage	Uitenhage	Provincial Heritage Site	33°45′59″S 25°23′59″E	Upload Photo
9/2/095/0005	Muir College Boys' Primary School, Park Avenue, Uitenhage	Type of site: School Current use: Educational/School.	Uitenhage	Uitenhage	Provincial Heritage Site	33°45′46″S 25°23′58″E	Upload Photo
9/2/095/0006	Old Magistrate's Court, Caledon Street, Uitenhage	Type of site: Courthouse.	Uitenhage	Uitenhage	Provincial Heritage Site	33°45′59″S 25°23′59″E	Upload Photo
9/2/095/0007	Scheepers House, 11/13 Cuyler Street, Uitenhage	.	Uitenhage	Uitenhage	Provincial Heritage Site	33°45′51″S 25°23′38″E	Upload Photo
9/2/095/0008	34 Cuyler Street, Uitenhage	.	Uitenhage	Uitenhage	Provincial Heritage Site	33°45′55″S 25°23′33″E	Upload Photo
9/2/095/0010	Site of Anglo-Boer War Concentration Camp, Uitenhage	The concentration camp site at Uitenhage was in use from April to October 1902, and was one of the last of about 50 concentration camps that were established during the Anglo-Boer War. Mainly women and children from the Orange Free State were housed here. Type of site: Concentration Camp.	Uitenhage	Uitenhage	Provincial Heritage Site	33°43′35″S 25°25′23″E	Upload Photo
9/2/095/0011	Old Drostdy, 50 Caledon Street, Uitenhage	The designer of the Drostdy building was M L Thibault, the well-known architect. Construction started in 1804, was completed in 1810. Today the Drostdy forms part of the historic core of Uitenhage. Type of site: Drostdy.	Uitenhage	Uitenhage	Provincial Heritage Site	33°46′10″S 25°24′15″E	The designer of the Drostdy building was M L Thibault, the well-known architect. Construction started in 1804, was completed in 1810. Today the Drostdy forms part of the historic core of Uitenhage. Type of site: Drostdy.
9/2/095/0012	Town Hall, 25 Market Street, Uitenhage	Type of site: Town Hall.	Uitenhage	Uitenhage	Provincial Heritage Site	33°46′08″S 25°24′00″E	Type of site: Town Hall. Media related to Uitenhage Town Hall at Wikimedia Commons
9/2/095/0013	Old Railway Station, Market Street, Uitenhage	This railway station, which was erected during 1875, is the original terminus building of one of the earliest railway lines in South Africa. Type of site: Railway Station.	Uitenhage	Uitenhage	Provincial Heritage Site	33°46′13″S 25°23′56″E	This railway station, which was erected during 1875, is the original terminus building of one of the earliest railway lines in South Africa. Type of site: Railway Station. Media related to Old Railway Station, Uitenhage at Wikimedia Commons
9/2/095/0014	Blenheim House, 4 Baird Street, Uitenhage	Architecturally Blenheim house was vastly altered in the hands of the Dolley family, since it was converted into a double-storeyed house in 1903, with a pair of high gables containing the two dates facing the street. In this respect the house has its Cape Originally built in 1815 as a single-storeyed residence by the Government Surveyor, Mr. Knoble. It was the first house of any size apart from the Drostdy to be built in Uitenhage and was often spoken of as No. 1 Uitenhage. Mr. Knoble was responsible for it. This imposing dwelling-house with its Cape-Dutch features was originally erected in 1815 as a single-storey building. In 1903 an upper storey and a wood-decorated verandah were added.	Uitenhage	Uitenhage	Provincial Heritage Site	33°46′00″S 25°23′54″E	Upload Photo
9/2/095/0015	23 Cuyler Street, Uitenhage	.	Uitenhage	Uitenhage	Provincial Heritage Site	33°45′52″S 25°23′36″E	Upload Photo
9/2/095/0016	21 Cuyler Street, Uitenhage	.	Uitenhage	Uitenhage	Provincial Heritage Site	33°45′52″S 25°23′36″E	Upload Photo
9/2/095/0017	Cuyler Manor, Uitenhage District	This predominantly Cape Dutch homestead was erected in 1814 by Colonel Jacob Glen Cuyler, landdrost of Uitenhage. Colonel Cuyler was closely associated with the settlement of the British Settlers of 1820.	Uitenhage	Uitenhage	Provincial Heritage Site	33°46′10″S 25°24′15″E	This predominantly Cape Dutch homestead was erected in 1814 by Colonel Jacob Glen Cuyler, landdrost of Uitenhage. Colonel Cuyler was closely associated with the settlement of the British Settlers of 1820.
9/2/095/0024	Farmstead, Totteridge Park, near Perseverance, Uitenhage District	Type of site: Farm Complex.	Uitenhage	Uitenhage	Provincial Heritage Site	33°48′24″S 25°31′00″E	Upload Photo
9/2/098/0003	Reformed Church, 16 Van Wyk Street, Venterstad	Type of site: Church Current use: Church : Reformed.	Venterstad	Venterstad	Provincial Heritage Site	30°46′30″S 25°48′04″E	Type of site: Church Current use: Church : Reformed.
9/2/109/0003	Dutch Reformed Church, 90 Grey Street, Dordrecht	This rectangular stone church building, with its elegant stone tower of 154 feet, is one of the best examples of the Gothic renewal building style. The cornerstone was laid on 20 May 1882 and the building was officially inaugurated on 18 August 1883. Type of site: Church. Current use: Church : Dutch Reformed.	Dordrecht	Wodehouse	Provincial Heritage Site	31°22′21″S 27°02′54″E	This rectangular stone church building, with its elegant stone tower of 154 feet, is one of the best examples of the Gothic renewal building style. The cornerstone was laid on 20 May 1882 and the building was officially inaugurated on 18 August 1883. Type of site: Church. Current use: Church : Dutch Reformed.
9/2/502/0002	Mission Church, Hertzog, Mpofu District	This church, the cornerstone of which was laid on 4 June 1834, was completed only in the beginning of 1845 owing to the devastation brought about by the Sixth Border War. Type of site: Church.	Mpofu	Mpofu	Provincial Heritage Site	32°34′38″S 26°43′06″E	Upload Photo
9/2/502/0007	University of Fort Hare Collections, University of Fort Hare, Alice	.	Alice	Alice	Heritage Object	32°47′00″S 26°53′00″E	Upload Photo
9/2/502/0009	Fort Armstrong, Balfour, Mpofu District	The town of Balfour on the Kat River stands at the foot of the Katberg Mountain about 40 km due north of Fort Beaufort. Not far to the south-east of the town, the road to Hertzog passes the farm Mesopotamia which nestles in a curve of the Kat River. A tow The fortification that was to protect the settlement here against the Xhosa was called Camp Adelaide. It was converted into a fort in accordance with the overall plan for the defence of the eastern frontier which Sir Benjamin D’Urban introduced after 1835 Type of site: Fort.	Mpofu	Mpofu	Provincial Heritage Site	32°33′48″S 26°41′30″E	Upload Photo
9/2/502/0016	Watch Tower, Peddie	The national road to East London by-passes the village of Peddie on the right; just beyond the village it veers sharply to the left past a plantation of blue-gum trees. The old Watch Tower of Fort Peddie stands hidden amongst these trees. Type of site: Watch Tower.	Peddie	Peddie	Provincial Heritage Site	33°11′11″S 27°07′06″E	Upload Photo
9/2/503/0003	Jubaeopsis Caffra, Mkambati	This grove of Jubaeopsis afra, one of the four species of palms indigenous to South Africa, stands at the Mkambati Leprosy Institution in the Lusikisiki district, north of Port St. Johns. Type of site: Tree.	Lusikisiki	Lusikisiki	Provincial Heritage Site	31°16′57″S 29°57′03″E	Upload Photo
9/2/503/0025	Cretaceous Deposits, Mzamba Beach, Mbizana	The winding road from Port St. Johns to Port Edward, just north of the mouth of the Umtamvnna River, passes through Lusikisiki, Flagstaff and Magusheni. On the coast just south of Port Edward, between the outlets of the Umtamvuna and Mzamba Rivers there is a very important occurrence of fossils of the Upper Creta ceous period. The deposits at Mzamba Beach were discovered by Captain Garden of the 54th Regiment. The Mzamba Formation provides a condensed record of the period between about 86 and 80 million years ago (Klinger pers.comm.), when there was a beach and shallow sea environment in this area, with large trees, marine reptiles, extinct ammonites and large (up to 1 m) mussels, sea urchins, snails and other shell fossils. Type of site: Fossil Beds.	Bizana	Mbizana	Provincial Heritage Site	31°05′50″S 30°10′30″E	Upload Photo
CiskeiTemp8	Domira, Lovedale, Victoria East District	Lovedale, the well-known educational institution is situated at Block Drift on the left bank of the Tyumie River, just north of Fort Hare. Domira is a sturdy stone house with a thatched roof in the grounds of the institution. Although Domira was built in 1837, the history of the place actually begins somewhat earlier. The Rev. John Brownlee started missionary work in the Tyumie valley in 1820. Missionaries of the Glasgow Society joined him and a mission station was established. Domira was the residence of Charles Lennox Stretch, diplomatic agent to the Gaikas (1836-1846). It also served as fortress, storm-centre and originally as the headquarters of Sir Andries Stockenstrom during the War of the Axe.	Alice	Victoria East	Provincial Heritage Site	32°47′00″S 26°53′00″E	Upload Photo
Graaff-ReinetTemp	Dutch Reformed Church, Adendorp, Graaff-Reinet District	Type of site: Church.	Adendorp	Graaff-Reinet	Provincial Heritage Site	32°18′10″S 24°32′53″E	Upload Photo
9/2/033/0007	Owl House, Erf 306 River Street, Nieu-Bethesda	Karoo type flat-roofed house with a stoep to the front. Outstanding garden features including camel yard. Type of site: Residence Current use: Residential.	Nieu-Bethesda	Graaff-Reinet	Provisional Protection	31°52′03″S 24°33′09″E	Karoo type flat-roofed house with a stoep to the front. Outstanding garden features including camel yard. Type of site: Residence Current use: Residential. Media related to Owl House at Wikimedia Commons
