= Cuyler baronets =

Extinct baronetcy in the Baronetage of the United Kingdom

The Cuyler Baronetcy, of St John's Lodge in Welwyn in the County of Hertford, was a title in the Baronetage of the United Kingdom. It was created on 29 October 1814 for General Cornelius Cuyler. The title became extinct on the death of the 5th Baronet in 1947.

Cornelius Cuyler, the 1st Baronet, was born in Albany, New York on 31 October 1740, the son of Cornelius Cuyler and Catalyntie Schuyler, a descendant of the Schuyler family. His brother Abraham was the last British appointed Mayor of Albany, New York, and Abraham's son Jacob Cuyler was a British Army officer who settled near Uitenhage in what was then Cape Colony.

== Cuyler baronets, of St John's Lodge (1814) ==
- General Sir Cornelius Cuyler, 1st Baronet (1740–1819)
- Sir Charles Cuyler, 2nd Baronet (1794–1862)
- Sir Charles Henry Johnes Cuyler, 3rd Baronet (1826–1885)
- Sir Charles Cuyler, 4th Baronet (1867–1919)
- Sir George Hallifax Cuyler, 5th Baronet (1876–1947)

Baronetage of the United Kingdom
Preceded by Hoste baronets	Cuyler baronets of St John's Lodge; 29 October 1814	Succeeded by Hamilton baronets
