= Cuyler Manor =

Historic place in South Africa

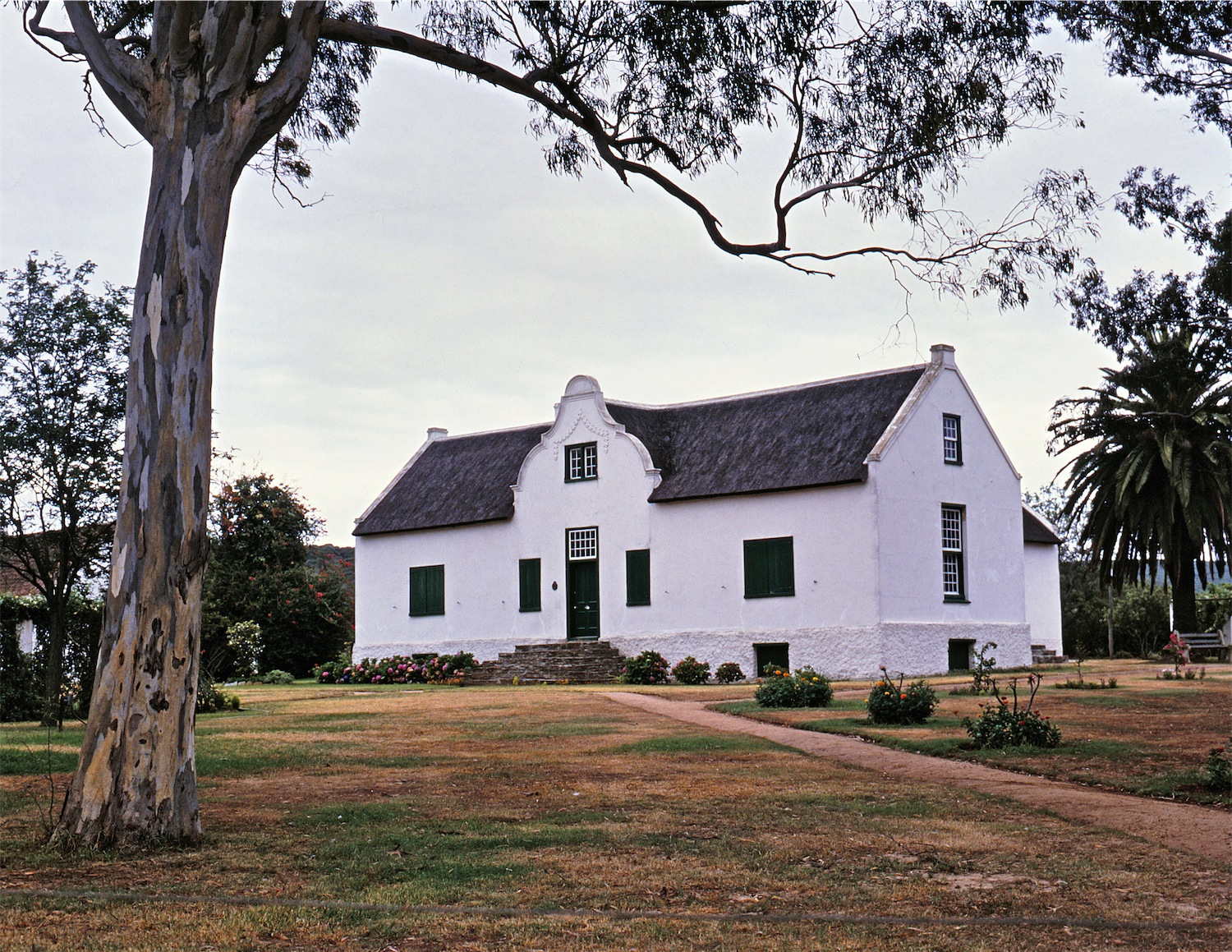
- Photographed 1988
- Established: 1814
- Location: Old Port Elizabeth Road, Kariega, Nelson Mandela Bay Metropolitan Municipality
- Coordinates: 33.769391°S 25.404264°E
- Type: Provincial Heritage Site
- Website: Uitengagen Museum - Cuyler Manor

Cuyler Manor (SAHRA 9/2/095/0017), or Cuyler House, is a historic house museum in the Western Region of the Eastern Cape province of South Africa. Cuyler Manor was designated as a Provincial Heritage Site on March 14, 1980. In addition to the farm house, the visitor house, coach house, wagon house, and mill house are protected historic sites, all located between the Swartkops River and a South African Railways facility.

Jacob Cuyler, landdrost of the area then known as Uitenhage, acquired the homestead, originally called Doom Kraal, in 1814 from Johannes Booyse for 1000 rixdollars. Cuyler retired to the Manor in 1827, "after the system of Landdrost was abolished." The buildings, constructed using slave labour, are predominantly in the Cape Dutch style. The homestead remained in the Cuyler family until 1966, when it was purchased and restored by the local government.

Museum staff periodically offer "demonstrations of traditional activities such as soap and candle making, baking, and weaving." The museum grounds include a herb garden, and are stocked with farm animals, including Angora goats, that are used to teach visitors about textile history.
