= Robert Holt Leigh =

Sir Robert Holt Leigh, 1st Baronet (1762–1843) was a British Member of Parliament.

== Early life ==
He was born on 25 December 1762, the eldest son of Holt and Mary Leigh née Owen. He had a younger brother, Roger, and a sister; Roger pre-deceased him, dying from injuries sustained in violence ahead of the Wigan election on 4 May 1831.

Leigh was educated at Manchester Grammar School, and matriculated in 1781 at Christ Church, Oxford. He was much later granted a B.A. degree by Oxford, in 1837, and an M.A. in 1838. He is described by the National Archives as a classical scholar, widely travelled and a cultivated man, versed in Greek literature. He lived at Whitley Hall until 1811 when he moved to Hindley Hall after rebuilding it. He sought advice from his sister during the rebuilding process but neglected to plan for staircases in the three storied building.

== Later life ==
Leigh was appointed Captain-Commandant of the Wigan Volunteer Association on 17 May 1798. He trained as a barrister, and then was returned unopposed to Parliament for the Borough of Wigan on 8 July 1802, a seat he kept until retiring in 1820. After the 1812 election he was listed as one of George Canning’s 11 personal followers returned to the new Parliament. Canning nominated Leigh as one of the men whom he wanted to offer a baronetcy. The Leigh Baronetcy, of Whitley in the County of Lancaster, was created in the Baronetage of the United Kingdom on 27 December 1814 for Robert Holt Leigh.

In 1830 Leigh was one of the initial proprietors of the Wigan Branch Railway. He was a feoffees (or governor) of the Manchester free school in the 1830s. By this time the school was getting richer on the proceeds of the mills which provided its funding and had a growing surplus on account. Its feoffees were heavily criticised for running the school to suit the needs of their offspring rather than as originally intended, the poor of Manchester. This led to a long running suit at the Court of Chancery, which eventually promoted the commercial side at the expense of the classical side of the school.

In his later years, Leigh had a notorious affair with Sarah Yates, the wife of one of his tenant farmers. He died unmarried on 21 January 1843, leaving a life interest in his estates to Thomas Pemberton (son of his cousin Margaret Leigh), who assumed the additional surname of Leigh and who was subsequently raised to the peerage in his own right as Baron Kingsdown. The reversion of his estates, after Baron Kingsdown died, together with the interest on £20,000, was left to Sarah Yates's son Roger Leigh, whom Sir Robert adopted, as long as he remained a member of the Church of England. (Note: £20,000 would be approximately £1.9 million in 2019 "Five Ways to Compute the Relative Value of a UK Pound Amount, 1270 to Present". MeasuringWorth. 2018.)

== Notes ==
Parliament of the United Kingdom
Preceded by John Cotes; Sir George Gunning, Bt	Member of Parliament for Wigan; 1802 – 1820; With: John Hodson (MP)	Succeeded by James Lindsay; James Alexander Hodson
Peerage of the United Kingdom
New creation	Baronet (of Whitley); 1814–1843	Extinct
Preceded by Hamilton baronets	Leigh baronets of Whitley; 27 December 1814	Succeeded by Buchan-Hepburn baronets
