= Mary Holland (activist) =

Irish anti-treaty supporter

Mary Holland (fl. 1922) of Galway was an Irish anti-treaty supporter.

Holland was a native of Lackagh, County Galway, and friendly with a number of people active in the Anti-Treaty IRA, one of whom was Christy Courtney of Athenry. Members of the Holland family and Courtney were attending a dance at the Hangar Ballroom, Salthill, when it was surrounded by Free State troops, who were searching for Courtney. The women were allowed to leave; Courtney took advantage of this by borrowing the shawl of his wife's sister, Kate Holland, and escaping. The ruse was discovered and the officer in charge began shouting with Mary Holland; the officer lost his temper and shot Holland in the chest. The bullet was too high to kill her, though she bore the scars on her chest (entry wound) and back (exit wound) for the rest of her life.
