= Kiler, Republic of Dagestan =

Kiler Килер Кьилер
- Selo
- Location within Republic of Dagestan Location within Russia
- Coordinates: 41°22′N 47°54′E
- Country: Russia
- Region: Republic of Dagestan
- District: Dokuzparinsky District
- Time zone: UTC+3:00

Kiler (Russian: Килер; Lezgian: Кьилер) is a rural locality (a selo) in Kilersky Selsoviet, Dokuzparinsky District, Republic of Dagestan, Russia. The population was 395 as of 2010. There are 2 streets.

== Geography ==
Kiler is located 6 km south of Usukhchay (the district's administrative centre) by road. Kerimkhanar and Gandurar are the nearest rural localities.
