= Sir John Hamilton, 1st Baronet, of Woodbrook =

Lieutenant-General Sir John Hamilton Bt
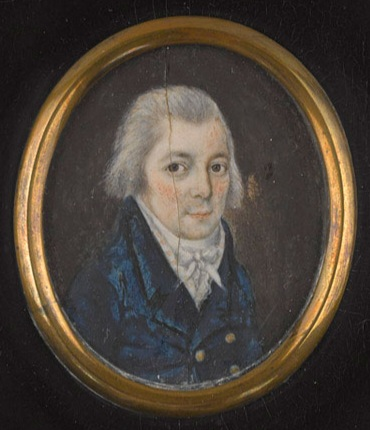
- Portrait, 1815
- Born: 4 August 1755; Strabane, County Tyrone, Ireland
- Died: 24 December 1835 (aged 80); Tunbridge Wells, Kent
- Military career
- Allegiance: Honourable East India Company; United Kingdom; Kingdom of Portugal
- Branch: (United Kingdom) British Army
- Service years: 1771–1835
- Rank: British Army Lieutenant-General
- Conflicts: Invasion of Cooch Behar; First Anglo-Maratha War; Capture of Lahar; Capture of Gwalior; Capture of Bijaigarh; Second Mysore War; Capture of Bangalore; French Revolutionary Wars; Haitian Revolution; Napoleonic Wars; Battle of Albuera; Second Siege of Badajoz; Defence of Alba de Tormes Battle of Nivelle
- Awards: Baronetcy of Woodbrook; Knight Grand Cross of the Order of the Tower and Sword; British knighthood

Lieutenant-General Sir John James Hamilton, 1st Baronet (4 August 1755 – 24 December 1835) was a British officer of the Honourable East India Company, the British Army and during the Napoleonic Wars the Portuguese Army who saw action across the world from India to the West Indies and was honoured for his service by both the British and Portuguese royal families. Of noble Irish descent, related by birth to the first Earl Castle Stewart and by marriage to the Earl of Tyrone, Hamilton's extensive career and brave service was widely recognised during his life and after his death.

== Early career ==
John Hamilton was born in Woodbrook near Strabane, County Tyrone, Ireland to James and Elinor Hamilton in 1755. His mother was the niece of the Earl Castle Stewart and through family connections young Hamilton was able to secure a commission in the army of the Honourable East India Company aged only 16 in 1771. Taking a Bengal cadetship and joining the Bengal Light Infantry in 1772, Hamilton was almost immediately pressed into action, participating the British invasion of Cooch Behar at the invitation its rulers who were facing a simultaneous invasion from the Bhutanese to the north. In 1778 Hamilton was promoted to lieutenant and in 1780 was once again in action during the First Anglo-Maratha War, where his troops participated in the storm and capture of Lahar, Gwalior and Bijaigarh from the Maratha Empire. In 1781 at the war's conclusion, Hamilton was promoted again, to captain.

In 1788, seeking advancement, Hamilton transferred to the regular British Army, being attached to the new 76th Regiment of Foot in Calcutta as captain. With this formation, Hamilton was engaged in 1794 during the Second Mysore War fought against the Tipu Sultan, when his troops captured the city of Bangalore which later became part of British East India. The same year, Hamilton married Emily Sophia Monck, the daughter of George Paul Monck and Lady Aramita Beresford, daughter of Marcus Beresford, Earl of Tyrone. Hamilton was promoted to brevet major in the aftermath of this operation and in 1795 was sent as a lieutenant colonel with the 81st Regiment of Foot to the West Indies during the British attempt to capture San Domingo. The effort failed due to the ongoing Haitian Revolution, but Hamilton again distinguished himself during the campaign.

== Napoleonic Wars ==
In 1798 Hamilton was sent to the Cape Colony in South Africa which had only recently been captured from the Dutch. There he and his regiment formed part of the garrison until the Peace of Amiens when he returned to Britain, briefly returning to the Cape at the fresh outbreak of the Napoleonic Wars in 1803 before being made a brigadier-general and appointed to the staff in Ireland. Tiring of working in Ireland, Hamilton volunteered in 1809 to be attached to the Portuguese Army, a formation shattered by the French invasion of 1808. In 1809 as he trained and organised a division of Portuguese infantry, Hamilton was promoted to major-general and in his new rank was made Inspector-General of Portuguese Infantry.

Hamilton was an efficient officer and with his division, attached himself to Sir Arthur Wellesley's British army on campaign in 1810. In 1811 the Portuguese formation underwent its first major action at the Battle of Albuera, Hamilton's division acting as a ready reserve and being called into the height of the battle to reinforce the Allied centre. Hamilton's forces had in fact been drawn into the fight on the left of the Allied line and took some time to be extracted. In the aftermath of the battle, Hamilton's troops were the steadiest and freshest available and immediately returned to the ultimately unsuccessful Second Siege of Badajoz. It has been said of Hamilton that he "evinced the utmost steadiness and courage" at Albuera.

Hamilton commanded the division until 1813, his troops seeing further action defending the town of Alba de Tormes against an army under Marshal Soult in November 1812. In 1813 after four years continuous campaigning, Hamilton was forced to return to England on sick leave and during his absence he was made a Knight Grand Cross of the Order of the Tower and Sword by the Portuguese monarchy and was knighted by the Prince Regent as well as being made honorary colonel of the 2nd Ceylon Regiment. Hamilton returned to his division in late 1813 and commanded them during the last of the fighting in the Peninsula War, seeing action at the Battle of Nivelle. Following the Peace of Fontainebleau, Hamilton returned to the British Army, was made lieutenant general in recognition of his service and placed in the quiet command of Duncannon Fort.

In December 1814, Hamilton was further rewarded with a baronetcy and retirement to his family estates. In 1823 he was made the Colonel-in-chief of 69th Regiment of Foot. He died in 1835 at Tunbridge Wells and was buried in Kensal Green Cemetery in London, survived by his wife, five daughters and son Sir John James Hamilton, 2nd Baronet.

== Coat of arms ==
Coat of arms of Sir John Hamilton, 1st Baronet, of Woodbrook
Crest First, of augmentation, A mount, thereon a castle, as in the Arms; Second, Out of a ducal coronet or an oak tree traversed by a frame saw proper. Escutcheon Quarterly: 1st and 4th Gules, three cinquefoils pierced ermine, 2nd and 3rd Argent, a lymphad sable, over all a chief of augmentation; argent, a mount, thereon a castle, a Spanish flag flowing from the battlements, all proper, beneath inscribed, "Alba de Tormes". Supporters Two antelopes argent, ducally gorged, cliained and unguled or. Motto Over first Crest, "Alba de Tormes"; Over second, "Through"; Below Crest, "Sola nobilitas virtus"

== Notes ==
Military offices
Preceded by William Carr Beresford, 1st Viscount Beresford	Colonel of the 69th (South Lincolnshire) Regiment of Foot; 1823–1836	Succeeded by John Vincent
Baronetage of the United Kingdom
New creation	Baronet (of Woodbrook); 1814–1835	Succeeded by John Hamilton
