= Western Region, Eastern Cape =

Region of Eastern Cape in South Africa

The Western Region is one of the four regions of Eastern Cape in South Africa.
