= Sir James Hamilton, 2nd Baronet, of Woodbrook =

British politician

James John Hamilton (1 March 1802 – 12 January 1876) was a British politician.

Hamilton was educated at Harrow School and Christ Church, Oxford, before joining the Rifle Brigade, in which he served as second lieutenant. At the 1837 UK general election, he stood in Sudbury for the Conservative Party, winning election, but he stood down in December. At both the 1841 and 1847 UK general elections, he stood in Marylebone, but did not win a seat.

Hamilton died in 1876, following which, his widow erected a memorial fountain in Portman Square.

Parliament of the United Kingdom
Preceded by John Bagshaw; Benjamin Smith	Member of Parliament for Sudbury; 1837; With: Edward Barnes	Succeeded by Joseph Bailey; Edward Barnes
Baronetage of the United Kingdom
Preceded by John Hamilton	Baronet (of Woodbrook); 1835–1876	Succeeded by Succession failed
