= Charles Cuyler =

English cricketer and British Army officer (1867–1919)

Personal information
- Full name: Charles Cuyler
- Born: 15 August 1867; Almondsbury, Gloucestershire, England
- Died: 1 October 1919 (aged 52); Wheatley, Oxfordshire, England
- Batting: Left-handed

Domestic team information
- Years: Team
- 1895: Marylebone Cricket Club

Career statistics
Competition	First-class
Matches	1
Runs scored	0
Batting average	0.00
100s/50s	–/–
Top score	0
Catches/stumpings	–/–
- Source: Cricinfo, 25 September 2020

Sir Charles Cuyler, 4th Baronet, OBE (15 August 1867 – 1 October 1919) was an English first-class cricketer and British Army officer.

The son of Sir Charles Cuyler, he was born in August 1867 at Almondsbury, Gloucestershire and was educated at Clifton College. His father died during his final year at Clifton, with Cuyler succeeding him as the 4th Baronet of the Cuyler baronets in August 1885. From Clifton he went up to the Royal Military College, Sandhurst where he graduated into the Oxfordshire and Buckinghamshire Light Infantry as a second lieutenant in September 1887. He was promoted to lieutenant in January 1890, with promotion to captain coming in January 1895.

Cuyler also played first-class cricket in 1895 for the Marylebone Cricket Club (MCC) at Dublin against Dublin University. Batting twice in the match, he was dismissed in both MCC innings' without scoring by Ernest Ensor and Robert Gwynn respectively. He became an instructor at Sandhurst in August 1897, a post he held until January 1903. He was seconded for service as an adjutant of volunteers in January 1904. He retired from active service in September 1907, by which time he held the rank of major.

Cuyler was recommissioned during the First World War, gaining the temporary rank of lieutenant colonel while commanding a depot. He was made an OBE in the 1918 New Year Honours for services commanding the 43rd Regimental District Recruiting Area. Cuyler died suddenly without issue at Shotover Park in Oxfordshire in October 1919. He was succeeded as the 5th Baronet by his brother Sir George Cuyler.

Baronetage of the United Kingdom
Preceded by Sir Charles Cuyler	Baronet (of St John's Lodge); 1885–1919	Succeeded by Sir George Cuyler
