= Abraham Cuyler =

American businessman and politician

Abraham C. Cuyler

Mayor of Albany, New York
- In office 1770–1778
- Preceded by: Volkert Petrus Douw
- Succeeded by: John Barclay

Personal details
- Born: 11 April 1742 Albany, New York
- Died: 5 February 1810 (aged 67) Montreal
- Spouse: Janet Glen
- Children: Jacob Glen Cuyler
- Parent(s): Cornelis Cuyler; Catalyntie Schuyler
- Relatives: Sir Cornelius Cuyler, 1st Baronet (brother)
- Occupation: Businessman
- Known for: Mayor of Albany

Abraham Cornelius Cuyler (April 11, 1742 – February 5, 1810) was a businessman and the last mayor of colonial Albany, New York, the third generation in a row to serve in that office.

== Early life ==
Abraham was born in 1742 to Mayor Cornelis Cuyler (1697-1765) and Catalyntie Schuyler (1704-1758). His father was a fur trader and merchant who represented Albany's interests in Mohawk Country and Canada. Cornelius was an alderman and an active member of the Indian Affairs Commission and also served as Mayor of Albany from 1742 until 1746. His older brother was Sir Cornelius Cuyler, 1st Baronet (1740–1819).

Abraham's paternal grandparents were Albany Mayor Johannes Cuyler (1661–1747) and Elsie Ten Broeck. He was also the great-grandson of Philip Pieterse Schuyler (1628–1683) and the great-grandson of Albany Mayor Dirck Wesselse Ten Broeck (1638–1717). The Cuyler family is descended from Hendrick Cuyler (1637–1690) who settled in New Amsterdam during the 1650s, and was the father of Johannes, the mayor, and Abraham Cuyler (1663–1747).

== Career ==
Cuyler was a mayor of Albany, New York from 1770 to 1778, he was also a businessman who made his money from importing metalware. In addition Cuyler was a captain of an Albany militia company, his mayoral administration ended in June 1776 when he was arrested during the American Revolution because of his sympathies to the British; Cuyler was exiled to Connecticut, and later imprisoned at Fishkill, New York. He escaped to the British.

Cuyler's property was confiscated and he was condemned to death under the Act of Attainder in 1779. Destitute, he sailed to England to seek relief, where he was granted an annuity. He eventually returned to New York. He was unsuccessful in recovering his assets in Albany and so he and his family moved to Montreal. Here he was appointed inspector of refugee loyalists in the Quebec City area.

Cuyler decided to form a settlement Cape Breton Island for some 3,000 loyalists then in Quebec in 1766. Together with David Mathews, a former mayor of New York City and attorney general of Cape Breton and a distant cousin through the Schuyler family, he came into conflict with Joseph Frederick Wallet DesBarres, lieutenant governor of Cape Breton over shortage of supplies on the island. This conflict caused him to move back to Montreal, where he spent his final years.

== Family ==
Cuyler was married to Janet (Jannetje) Glen, who was sister to Henry Glen (1739–1814), and the daughter of Jacob Glen and Elizabeth Cuyler. Together they had:

- Jacob Glen Cuyler (1773–1854), who married Maria Elizabeth Hartman, a South African, in 1808. they had two daughters and three sons.

Cuyler died in Montreal on February 5, 1810.

=== Descendants ===
His great-granddaughter was the botanist and botanical illustrator Maria Elizabeth Holland (1836–1878).

== See also ==
- Schuyler family

Civic offices
| Preceded by Volkert Petrus Douw | Mayor of Albany, New York; 1770-1778 | Succeeded by John Barclay |
