= Kyler =

Kyler is a masculine given name, a mix of the names Tyler and Kyle, or originating from the surname Kyler, an Anglicized form of the Dutch surname Cuyler. Notable people with the name include:

- Kyler Edwards (born 1999), American basketball player
- Kyler Fackrell (born 1991), American football player
- Kyler Fisher (born 2001), American football player
- Kyler Gordon (born 1999), American football player
- Kyler Jukes (born 1979), Canadian football player
- Kyler Kerbyson (born 1993), American football player
- Kyler Kleibrink (born 1995), Canadian curler
- Kyler Murray (born 1997), American football player
- Kyler Pettis (born 1992), American actor
- Kyler Phillips (born 1995), American mixed martial artist
- Kyler Sweely, American politician
