= Cuylerville, South Africa =

Cuylerville
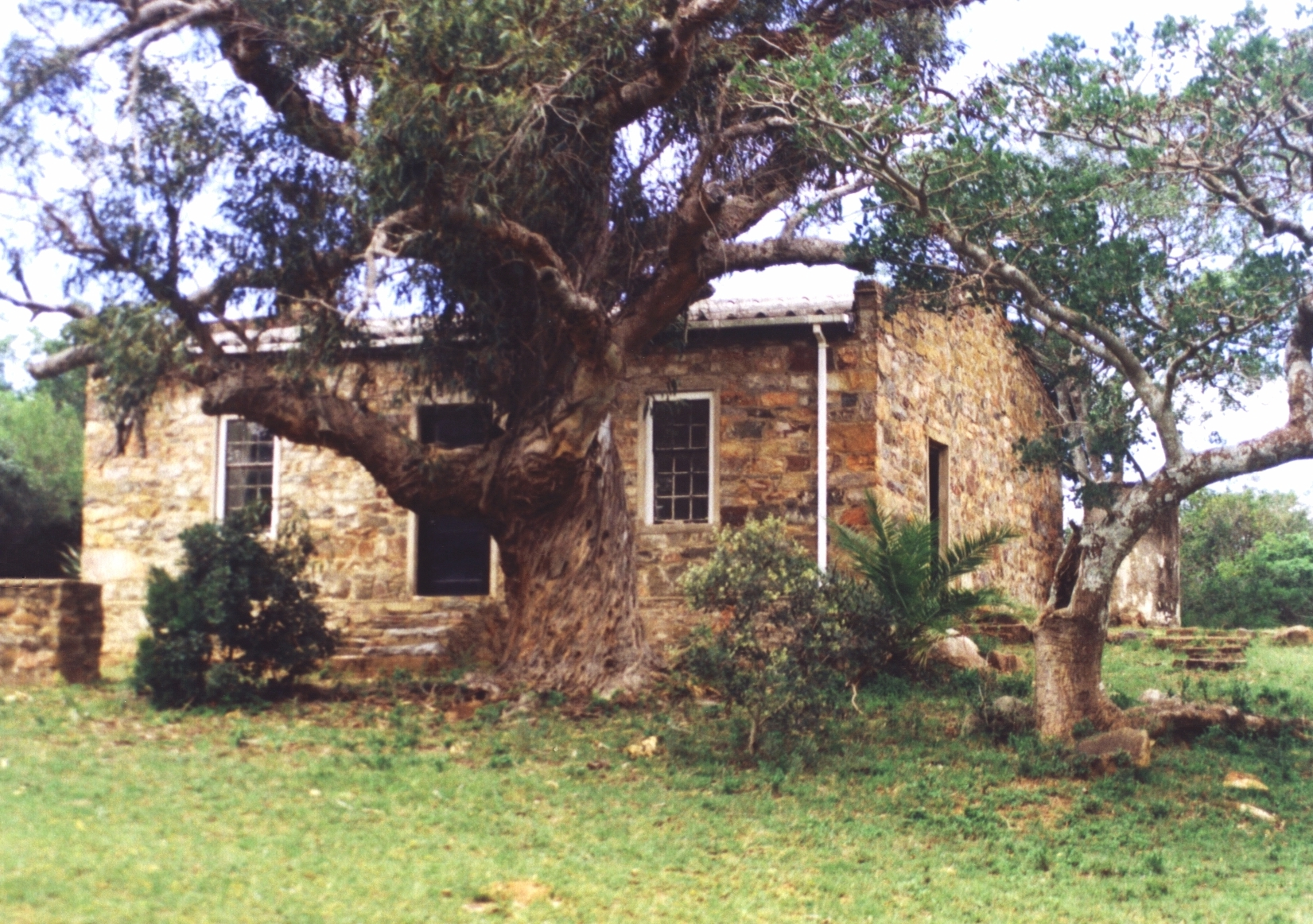
- Cuylerville Church

- Location within Eastern Cape Location within South Africa
- Coordinates: 33.493°S 26.978°E
- Country: South Africa
- Province: Eastern Cape
- District: Sarah Baartman
- Municipality: Ndlambe
- Time zone: UTC+2 (SAST)

Cuylerville is a village in South Africa, located halfway between Bathurst and the Great Fish River. It was the first village established by the 1820 settlers, and was named after Colonel Jacob Glen Cuyler, the military commander at Fort Frederick.

== See also ==
- List of heritage sites in Eastern Cape
