= Maria Elizabeth Holland =

South African botanical artist (1836–1878)

- Born: Maria Elizabeth Armstrong; 24 April 1836; Uitenhage
- Died: 15 January 1878 (aged 41); London
- Known for: contributions to Thesaurus capensis

Maria Elizabeth Holland (24 April 1836 — 15 January 1878) was a Cape Colony botanical artist and plant collector.

== Early life ==
She was the eldest of fourteen children and was married to John Holland of Port Elizabeth. Her grandfather was Jacob Glen Cuyler.

== Career ==
She contributed to volume I (1860) of William Henry Harvey's Thesaurus capensis, and received praise from Harvey for her "well-executed outline drawings".

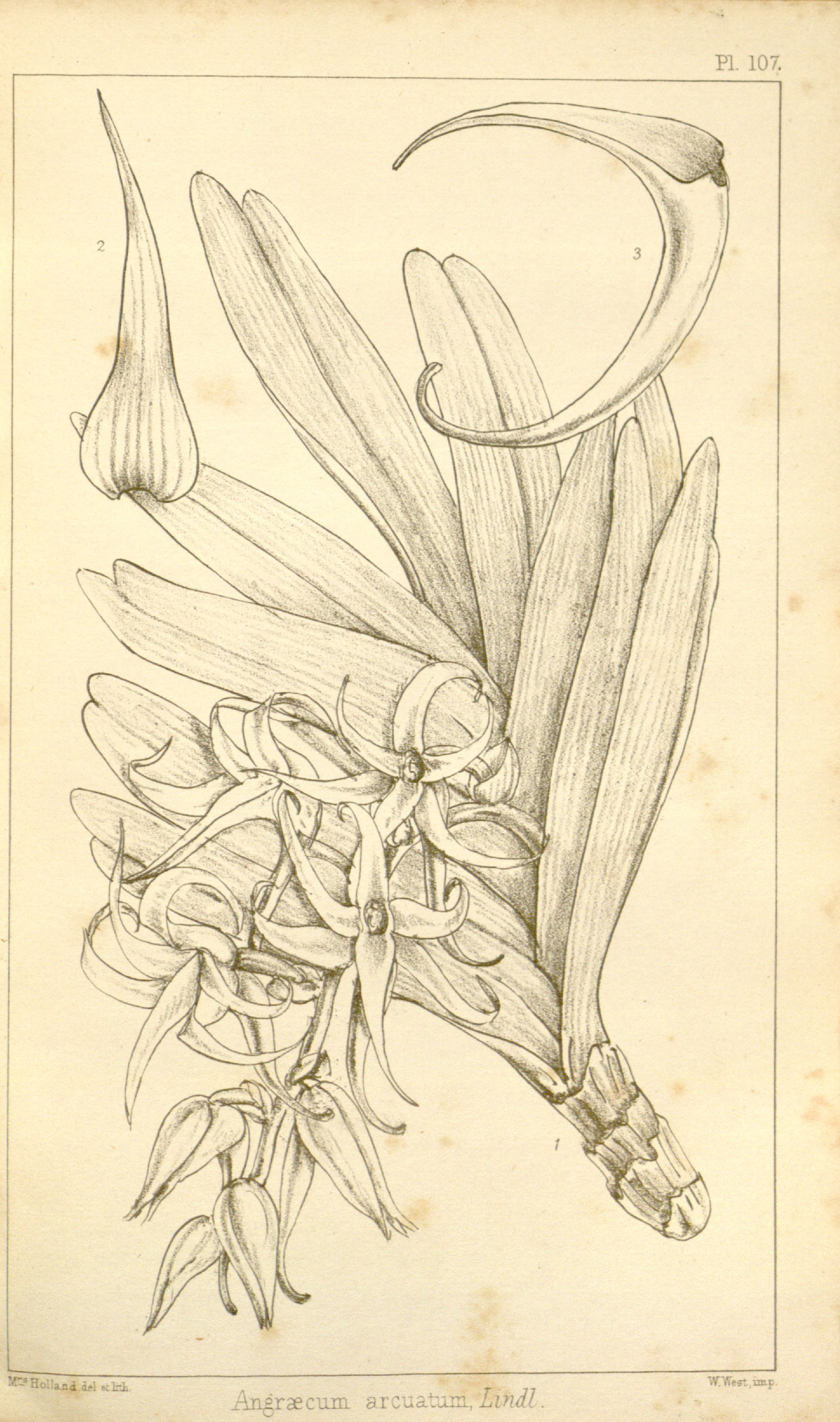
Cyrtorchis arcuata from Thesaurus capensis

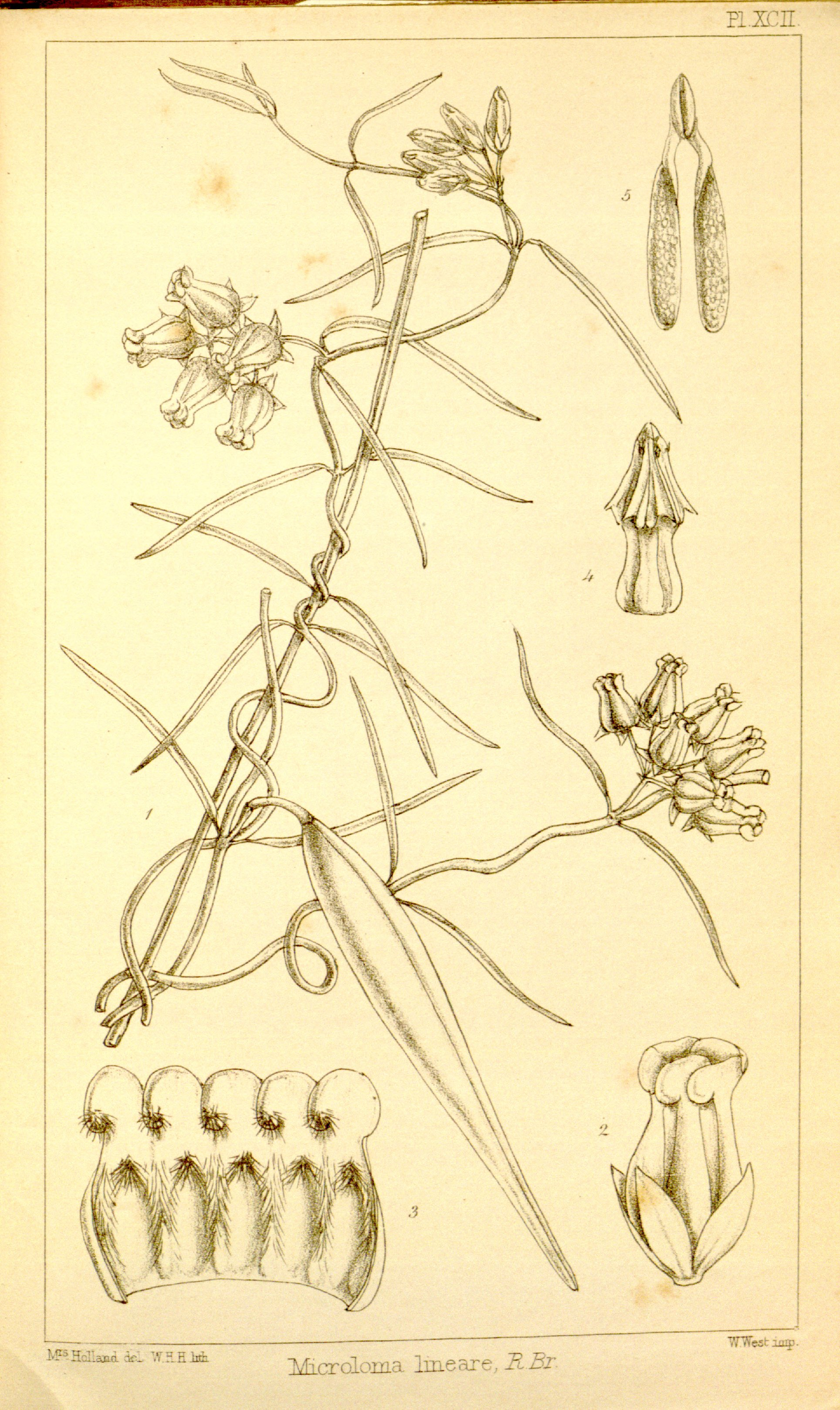
Microloma lineare from Thesaurus capensis
