= Jacob Cuyler =

British Army officer (1773–1854)

- Born: 1773; Albany, New York
- Died: April 14, 1854 (aged 80–81); Cuyler Manor, Cape Colony
- Spouse: Maria Elizabeth Hartman
- Parent(s): Abraham Cuyler; Jannetje Glen

General Jacob Glen Cuyler (1773 – April 14, 1854) was a British Army officer who played a major role in the settlement of the 1820 Settlers in the Eastern Cape of the Cape Colony.

== Early life ==
Jacob Glen Cuyler was born in 1773 to Abraham Cuyler, the son of Cornelius Cuyler and Catalynyje Schuyler, and Jannetje Glen (the sister of Henry Glen) in Albany, New York, British America. Jacob's father was the last British-appointed mayor of Albany. Abraham Cuyler remained loyal to the crown, but was banished from New York by the revolutionaries, and lost all of his substantial land holdings in Albany. At the start of the American War of Independence, Jacob Glen Cuyler's father was incarcerated and the family went from exile in New York City to Canada where Abraham Cuyler died in 1810. In 1789, Jacob was among several family members compensated for their American losses by the British with land in Canada. Abraham Cuyler was able to purchase commissions as officers for his sons in the British Army in 1799.

== Arrival in Cape Colony ==
In 1806, Jacob Glen Cuyler was a captain in the 59th Regiment of Foot when it sailed from England to Cape Colony. In October 1808 he married a Cape Colony woman, Maria Elizabeth Hartman, they had two daughters and three sons. His granddaughter was the botanist and botanical illustrator Maria Elizabeth Holland. He settled on a large farm and was one of the founders of Uitenhage, a town in the East Cape district of Albany. The farm is now Cuyler Manor historic museum. According to a newspaper obituary, "General Jacob Glen Cuyler died at his residence, Cuyler Manor, near Uitenhage, on Friday, the 14th April [1854]."

== 1820 Settlers ==
Cuyler together with Lord Charles Somerset persuaded the British Parliament to vote funds to finance the settlement of parties of British settlers in order to strengthen the frontier. In 1820 numbers of English and Scots arrived. The Scots were settled in the Baviaans River Mountains, on land confiscated from the Slachter's Nek rebels while the English were settled in the Albany district to the south.

== Slachter's Nek Rebellion ==
In 1815, a farmer from the eastern border of the Cape Colony, Frederik Bezuidenhout, was summoned to appear before a magistrate's court after repeated allegations of his mistreating one of his Khoi labourers. Bezuidenhout resisted arrest and fled to a cave near his home where he defended himself against the soldiers sent to capture him. When he refused to surrender he was shot dead by one of the soldiers.

Bezuidenhout's brother, Hans, swore revenge. Together with a neighbour Hendrik Prinsloo, Hans Bezuidenhout organised an uprising against the British, believed by them to be hostile towards the Afrikaner farmers. On 18 November 1815, a commando of rebels met an armed force led by Jacob Glen Cuyler at Slachter's Nek. (Note: Slagtersnek location 32°41′54″S 25°49′42″E) Negotiations failed but 20 rebels surrendered, followed by several more over the following days. However, some of the leaders, among whom was Hans Bezuidenhout, refused to turn themselves over to Cuyler. On 29 November 1815, they were attacked by colonial troops. Everybody but Bezuidenhout surrendered and, like his brother, Hans died while resisting arrest.

The rebels were finally charged at Uitenhage. Some were cleared, others imprisoned or banished, six were sentenced to death but one of these was pardoned by Somerset. On 9 March 1816 the remaining five were hanged in public at Van Aardtspos. Four of the nooses broke during the execution due to old ropes being used. The four whose ropes broke, as well as the public, pleaded for their lives but Cuyler ordered that they be hanged a second time and they were hanged one by one. The names of the five who were hanged were Hendrik Prinsloo, Stephanus Bothma, Abraham Bothma, Cornelius Faber and Theunis de Klerk. The hanging of these five caused deep resentment towards the British by the Boers.

== Commemoration ==
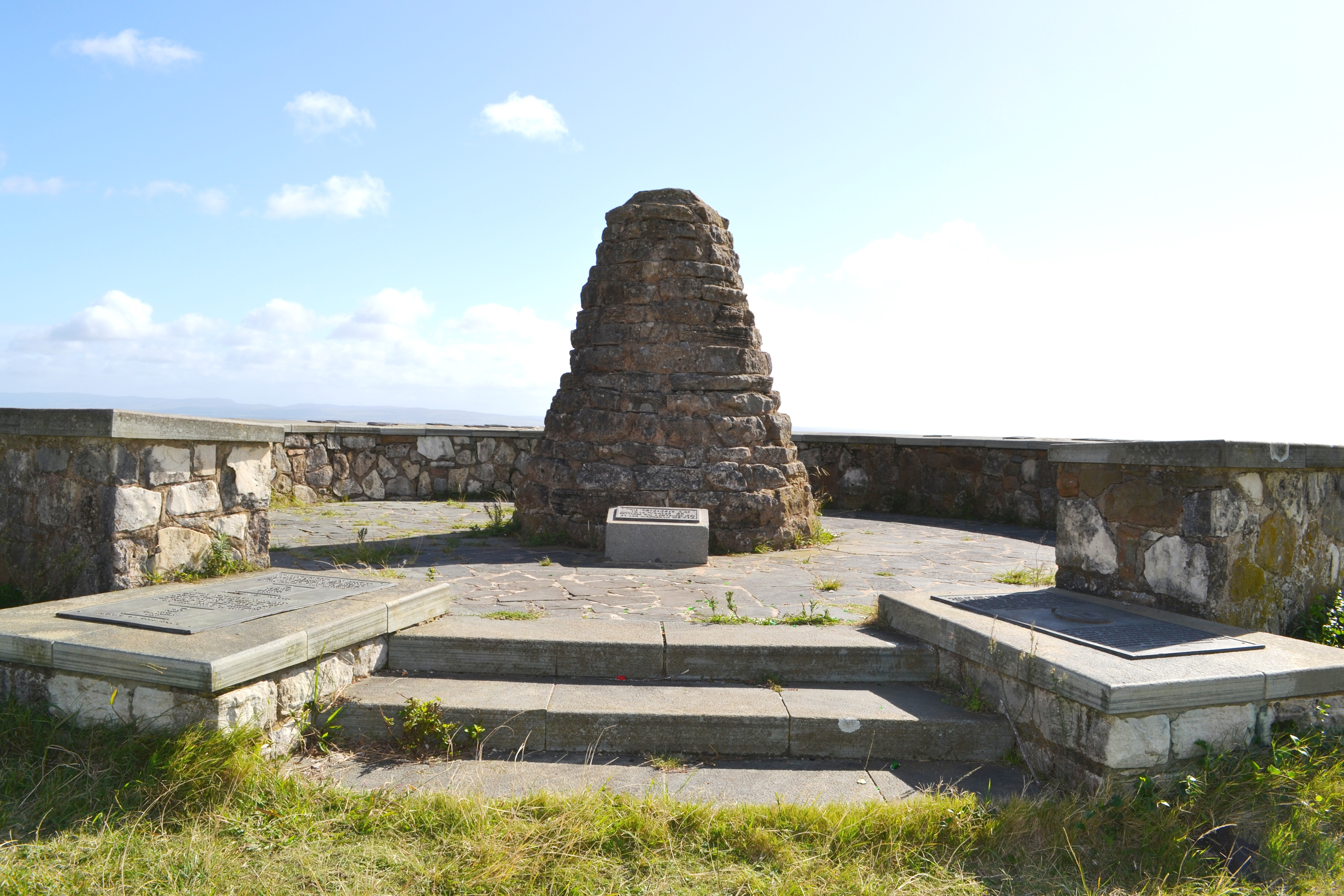
Toposcope, Bathurst

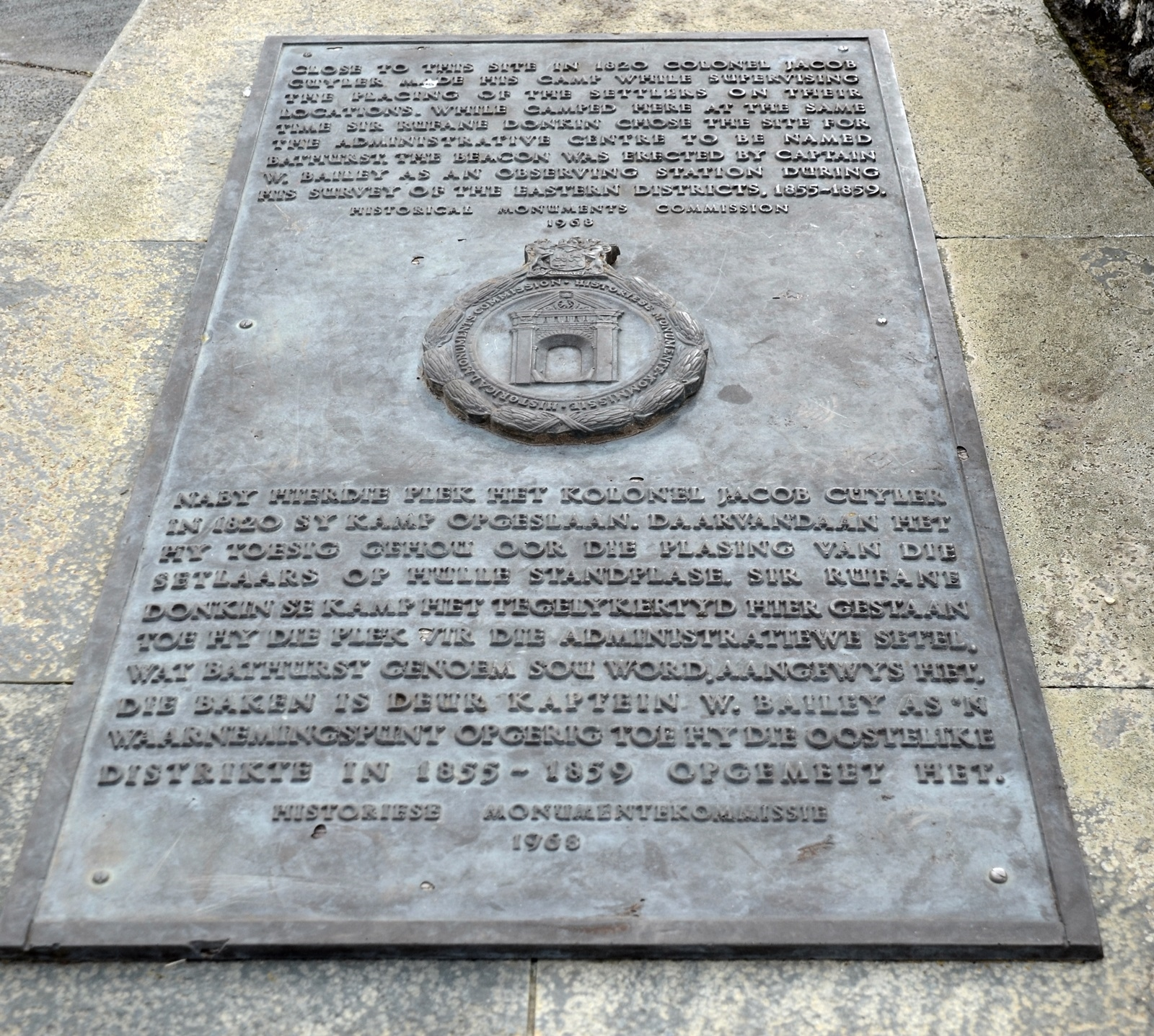
Bathurst toposcope plaque

The village of Cuylerville was established by British settlers in 1820. They named it in honour of Cuyler, then military commander at Fort Frederick, in recognition of the assistance he rendered them. There is a Cuyler Street in the city of Grahamstown. (Note: Cuyler Street location 33°18′36″S 26°31′31″E) A toposcope and commemorative cairn in Bathurst mark the spot where Cuyler made his camp while supervising the placing of the 1820 Settlers on their locations. (Note: Toposcope location 33°29′47″S 26°50′38″E) While camped here at the same time Sir Rufane Donkin chose the site for the administrative centre to be named Bathurst. The beacon was erected by Captain W. Bailey as an observing station during his survey of the eastern districts, 1855-1859.
