= Chomley =

Chomley is a surname. Notable people with this name include:

- Charles Henry Chomley (1868–1942), Australian farmer, barrister, writer and journalist
- Francis Chomley (1822–1892), Irish businessman in Hong Kong and China
- Hussey Chomley (1832–1906), Irish-born Australian police officer
- Mary Chomley (1871–1960), Australian charity worker, arts patron and feminist
- Patricia Downes Chomley (1910–2002), Australian nurse
