= 1918 New Year Honours (OBE) =

Award giving in 1918

The 1918 New Year Honours were appointments by King George V to various orders and honours to reward and highlight good works by citizens of the British Empire. The appointments were published in The London Gazette and The Times in January, February and March 1918.

== Military Division ==
- Col. Augustus Mervyn Owen Anwyl Anwyl-Passingham, Recruiting Region Cmdr.
- Lt.-Col. Francis Logie Armstrong, in charge of Canadian Records
- Maj. Edward George Graham Talbot Baines, York and Lancaster Reg.; Sec., Nottingham Territorial Force Association
- Lt.-Col. Richard Bell-Irving, Instructor, Royal Flying Corps
- Maj. Lionel Oxborrow Betts, Australian Army Medical Corps
- Lt.-Col. Gerald Walker Birks, Ofc. in Charge of Canadian Y.M.C.A. Services
- Capt. Archibald Campbell Black, 7th Battalion, Royal Scots; Ministry of National Service
- Maj. Frederick Blakemore, Army Pay Dept.
- Maj. William Henry Booth DSO East Kent Reg.; Deputy Assistant Director of Railway Transport, Scottish Command
- Capt. Francis Stewart Evelyn Boothby, Sec., Lincoln Territorial Force Association
- Maj. John Bowden, Royal Engineers, Late Superintending Engineer, Ministry of Munitions, No. 2 Area (North-West England)
- Capt. Arthur Boyd, Royal Army Service Corps; General Sec., Navy and Army Canteen Board
- Capt. William Burton, York and Lancaster Reg.; Member of Anglo-Russian Sub-Committee, New York, Ministry of Munitions
- Maj. Charles Ernest Alfred French Somerset Butler, Earl of Carrick, Royal Army Service Corps; Adjutant-General's Dept., War Office
- Capt. William Stephen Cauvin, Adjutant-General's Dept., War Office
- Maj. Henry Edward Chaney, Headquarters. Training Division, Royal Flying Corps
- Maj. Sir Jocelyn Brudenell, Earl of Chichester, 5th Battalion, Royal Sussex Reg.; Adjutant-General's Dept., War Office
- Capt. George Clark, Royal Arty., Superintending Ofc. in Arty. Branch, War Office
- Maj. Thomas Dudley Cocke, Royal Army Service Corps; Section Director, Finance Dept., Ministry of Munitions
- Capt. Charles Leonard Conacher, Late in charge, Perivale Filling Factory, Ministry of Munitions
- Lt.-Col. Charles Paston Crane DSO York and Lancaster Reg.
- Maj. Francis Samuel Creswell, Park Cmdr., Royal Flying Corps
- Lt.-Col. Sir Charles Cuyler Bt Commanding 43rd Reg.al District Recruiting Area
- Lt.-Col. Richard Frederick Drury, attd. Royal Flying Corps
- Lt.-Col. Earle Calder Duffin, Assistant Q.M. General, Canadian Forces
- Maj. Henry Stuart Ebben, Deputy Assistant Adjutant-General, Royal Flying Corps
- Col. Henry John Edwards CB TD Commanding Ofc., No. 2 Ofc.s Cadet Battalion
- Henrietta Christobel Ellis, Commandant of the Motor Transport Section, Women's Legion
- Capt. Edward George Robert Fairholme, Royal Army Veterinary Corps; Chief Sec., Royal Society for the Prevention of Cruelty to Animals
- Capt. Charles Stanley Fisher, Acting Solicitor for Navy and Army Canteen Board
- Col. Walter Blunt Fletcher, Sec., Wiltshire Territorial Force Association
- Capt. Otto Tennent Eastman Freiligrath, Royal Army Service Corps; Staff Capt., War Office
- Maj. George Arthur Fulcher, Royal Arty., Deputy Assistant Director, Ordnance Dept., War Office
- Capt. Henry Game, Royal Field Arty.; Design Dept., Ministry of Munitions
- Lt.-Col. Jack Giffard, Royal Field Arty.; Member of Anglo-Russian Sub-Committee, New York, Ministry of Munitions
- Capt. Walter Brudenell Gill, Royal Engineers, Military Intelligence Branch, War Office
- Lt.-Col. Edward Shirley Godman, Dorsetshire Reg.; Assistant Provost-Marshal
- Lt. Ernest Goodwin, Technical Adviser on Explosives to Trench Warfare Dept., Ministry of Munitions
- Capt. Walter Herbert Lewis Goolden, Research Dept., Woolwich
- Capt. Gilbert Maxwell Adair Graham. Quarter Master-General's Dept., War Office
- Maj. James Alexander Green, South African Forces, Administrative Headquarters
- Maj. Francis Grehan, Norfolk Reg.; Sec., Norfolk Territorial Force Association
- Capt. Wilfrid Edward Hiley, Research Dept., Woolwich
- Capt. Archibald Vivian Hill, Cambridgeshire Reg.; Munitions Inventions Dept.
- Capt. William John Honey
- Hilda Horniblow, Deputy Commandant, Military Cooking Section, Women's Legion
- Maj. Cecil Harry St. Leger Howard, Recruiting Area Cmdr.
- Capt. Edward Maurice Berkeley Ingram, General Staff, War Office
- Arthur Godfrey James, Royal Army Service Corps; Ministry of National Service
- Maj. Charles Jarrott, Inspector of Mechanical Transport, Royal Flying Corps
- Maj. Harold Driver Jonas, Deputy Chief Valuer and Compensation Ofc., Directorate of Lands, Ministry of Munitions
- Capt. Thomas Athol Joyce, General Staff, War Office
- Lt.-Col. William Kingston, Royal Engineers, Chief Inspector of Works, War Office
- Capt. John Learmont DL JP Sec., Cumberland Territorial Force Association
- Capt. James Arthur Leeming, Royal Engineers, Section Director, Trench Warfare Supply Dept., Ministry of Munitions
- Maj. Hugh Bennett Lewers, Assistant Director of Medical Services, Australian Imperial Forces
- Capt. Francis Vivian Lister, Trench Warfare Research Dept., Ministry of Munitions
- Violet Beatrix Alice Lambton Long, Late Sec. of Women's Legion, Military Cooking Section
- Lt.-Col. Cyril Douglas Hughes MacAlpine, Canadian Army Service Corps
- Maj. John McAughey, Deputy Assistant Adjutant-General, Canadian Forces
- The Reverend Edmond McAuliffe, Chaplain, 3rd Class, Australian Imperial Forces
- The Reverend Angus MacDonald, Chaplain, 3rd Class, New Zealand Expeditionary Force
- Maj. Thomas McKibbin, Deputy Assistant Director of Medical Services, New Zealand Expeditionary Force
- Lt.-Col. Alexander Macmillan, Royal Garrison Arty.
- Capt. John McPherson, Adjutant, New Zealand Command Depot
- Capt. Henry Mansbridge, Sec., London Territorial Force Association
- Lt.-Col. Alexander Gordon Maxwell, Assistant Provost-Marshal
- Col. Charles Stuart Meeres, Royal Arty., Army Ordnance Corps Dept.
- Capt. George Metson, Ministry of National Service
- Maj. Alexander Montgomerie, Royal Newfoundland Reg.
- Capt. Harold Moreland, Section Director, Trench Warfare Supply Dept., Ministry of Munitions
- Capt. Arthur Lenox Napier, Yorkshire Reg.; Sec., Northumberland Territorial Force Association
- Capt. Walter Elphinstone Nevill, Nairobi Defence Force
- Capt. Richard William Alan, Earl of Onslow, General Staff, War Office
- Capt. Charles Phipps John Ovans, King's Own Scottish Borderers; Manager, Leeds National Projectile Factory, Ministry of Munitions
- Lt.-Col. Sydney Lewis Penhorwood, Director of Timber Operations, War Office
- Lt.-Col. Hugh Wharton Perkins, Deputy Assistant Director of Railway Transport, Southern Command
- Capt. Mansel Loudon Porter, King's Royal Rifle Corps; Sec., Berkshire Territorial Force Association
- Lt.-Col. Edwin Prismall TD Musketry Staff Ofc., Canadian Forces
- Capt. Alan Rae-Smith, Chief Accountant to Navy and Army Canteen Board
- Brevet Major John Wakefield Rainey, Army Veterinary Corps
- Lt.-Col. James Albert Reeks, Commanding 45th Reg.al District Recruiting Area
- Capt. Richard Gilbert Roberts, Instructor, Intelligence Corps
- Lt.-Col. Alexander Fowler Roberts, Director of Arty. (Field), and Senior Embarkation Ofc.
- Lt.-Col. Roddam John Roddam
- Maj. Robert Francis Ruck-Keene, Royal Arty., Sec., Yorkshire (North Riding) Territorial Force Association
- Edward John Russell FRS Technical Adviser in the Food Production Dept.; Director of the Rothamsted Experimental Station
- Capt. Cecil Myles Serjeantson, Sec., Leicester and Rutland Territorial Force Association
- Maj. Eric James Sexton, Commanding Australian Machine Gun Training Depot
- Maj. Frederic Joseph Sharp, Remount Service
- Lt.-Col. William Constable Shepherd, Commandant of Great Yarmouth
- Maj. Philip George Moncrieff Skene, Late Deputy Assistant Director, Ordnance Dept., War Office; Assistant Sec., Russian Supplies Committee, Ministry of Munitions
- Capt. Rowland Hill Stainforth, Deputy Controller, Controlled Establishments Branch, Ministry of Munitions
- Lt.-Col. Thomas Heron Steel, Australian Overseas Training Brigade
- Lt. Valentine Beardmore Stewart, Late Manager, Messrs. William Beardmore & Company, Ltd., Glasgow
- Maj. John Stuart, Assistant Inspector of Recruiting
- Maj. Brian Gresley Elton Sunderland, Deputy Assistant Director of Arty.
- Lt.-Col. Arthur Sykes, Royal Irish Fusiliers, Inspector of Army Catering
- Capt. Kenneth Symes, Late Head of Armour Plate Section, Mechanical Warfare Dept., Ministry of Munitions
- Capt. John Barwick Thompson, Border Reg., Ministry of National Service
- Lt.-Col. Edward Newbury Thornton, South African Forces; South African Hospital, Richmond Park
- Maj. Edwin Ernest Enever Todd, Army Pay Dept.
- Edith Mary Trotter, Recruiting Controller, Queen Mary's Army Auxiliary Corps
- Lt.-Col. William Kington Tucker, Forage Dept., War Office
- Capt. Clement Vallange, Design Dept., Ministry of Munitions
- Capt. Henry Edward van den Bergh, Chief Inspector and Controller, Buying Branch, Canteen Board
- Maj. Francis Peter Vidal, Army Pay Dept.
- Maj. James Taylor Watson, Embarkation Staff Ofc., New Zealand Expeditionary Force
- Capt. Gerald Hamilton Wicks, Trench Warfare Research Dept., Ministry of Munitions
- Lt.-Col. Arthur Cecil Williams, Director of Inspection, Optical Stores, Ministry of Munitions
- Capt. Charles Edward Williams, Section Director, Raw Materials Dept., Ministry of Munitions
- Brevet-Col. German Sims Woodhead VD RAMC
- Lt.-Col. Anthony Hudson Woodifield, in charge of Ordnance Depot, Didcot
- Capt. Charles Bernard Besly Yule, Royal Arty., Design Dept., Ministry of Munitions

For services in connection with the War in France, Egypt and Salonika —

- Capt. John Herbert Boraston, Records Ofc., Operations Section, General Headquarters, France
- Capt. William Lawrence Bragg, Depot, Field Survey Company
- Maj. William Henry Clifford, Army Printing and Stationery Services
- The Reverend Edward Arnold Fitch, Royal Army Chaplains' Dept.
- Lt.-Col. Charles Edward Percy Fowler, RAMC
- Maj. Francis Arthur Green, Army Printing and Stationery Services
- Capt. Myles Higgin-Birket, Cipher Ofc., General Headquarters, British Salonika Force
- Maj. Percy Reginald Nelson, Assistant to Ofc.-in-charge of Expeditionary Force Canteens, France
- Capt. Marcus Niebuhr Tod, Intelligence Corps, British Salonika Force
- Lt.-Col. Edward Constable Wright, in charge of Expeditionary Force Canteens, France

== Civil Division ==
- James Adam, Office Supervisor Edinburgh, Scottish Branch, British Red Cross Society
- Robert Adam, Late Assistant Director, Railway Materials Branch, Ministry of Munitions
- Thomas Martland Ainscough, Sec. to the Textile Committee and to the Standing Committee on Cotton Growing in the Empire
- Alexander Alcorn, Ministry of Shipping
- Evelyn Julia Allan, Honorary Sec., Chelsea Division, British Red Cross and Order of St. John of Jerusalem
- James Allan Chief Engineer, Ellerman Lines
- Harry Allden Ofc.-in-Charge, Royal Naval Gun Factory, West Houghton
- John Allen, Chairman, Steam Cultivation Development Association, and Hon. Adviser to the Food Production Dept.
- Mary Sophia Allen, Chief Superintendent, Women's Police Service
- Oswald Coleman Allen, Secretarial Ofc., Ministry of Munitions
- William George Allen, Expense Accounts Ofc.; H.M. Dockyard, Portsmouth
- William Henry Allen, Vice-Controller, Post Office Stores Dept.
- James Willcox Alsop JP Chairman, Liverpool Local Tribunal
- Amy Douglas Knyveton Anderson, Commandant, Waverley Abbey Auxiliary Hospital, Farnham, Surrey
- Lois Dessurne Anderson, Financial Expert Adviser to the Finance Section, Ministry of Blockade
- Lt.-Cmdr. Maxwell Henry Anderson, Royal Navy, Trade Division of the Naval Staff
- Thomas George Anderson, Superintending Clerk Naval Ordnance Dept., Admiralty
- Henry William Archer Manager and Sec. of the British Fishing Vessels War Risks Insurance Association, Ltd.
- Henry Armstrong, Sec. in Charge, North-Eastern Division, Y.M.C.A.
- Janet Stevenson Bennett, Lady Arthur, Vice-President of the Troon District, Scottish Branch, British Red Cross Society
- Cmdr. Edward Lindsay Ashley Foakes, Royal Navy, Naval Assistant to Director of Army Postal Services, and Nautical Adviser to the Post Office
- Peter Wilson Atkin JP Chairman of Salford Local Tribunal
- Amos Lowrey Ayre, District Director of Shipyard Labour (Glasgow), Admiralty Shipyard Labour Dept.
- Philip Henry Bagenal, Inspector, Local Government Board
- Francis Edward Bagnall, Section Director, Machine Tool Dept., Ministry of Munitions
- Arthur Stowey Bailey, Manager, Messrs. Cammell, Laird & Company, Ltd., Sheffield
- Hubert Baines, Deputy Chief Engineer, H.M. Office of Works
- Alfred Gabriel Baker, Superintendent of Queen Mary's Workshops, Brighton
- George Stephen Baker, Superintendent of the William Froude National Tank, National Physical Laboratory
- John William Baker, Manager, Messrs John Baker & Co., Ltd., Rotherham
- Robert John Balfour, Director of Finance, Metropolitan Special Constabulary
- Charlotte Marie-Louise Banbury, Commandant, Wych Cross Place Auxiliary Hospital, Forest Row, Sussex
- William Barber, Superintendent of Live Stock Division, Board of Agriculture for Scotland
- Henry Lowthian Barge, Engineer to Messrs. Bullivant & Company, Ltd.
- Ernest Augustus William Barnard, Superintending Civil Engineer, Director of Works Dept., Admiralty
- Anna Ethel Barnes, Sec. to Central Charities Committee
- Henry Barnes JP Honorary Sec. and Treasurer, Cumberland Branch, British Red Cross Society
- James Sidney Barnes, Acting Principal Clerk, Sec.'s Dept., Admiralty
- James Ronnie Barnett, Messrs. G. L. Watson & Company, Glasgow
- Alfred Barrow, Mayor of Barrow-in-Furness; Chairman of the Local Tribunal
- Capt. Edmund Burton Bartlett, Peninsular and Oriental Steam Navigation Company, Ltd.
- Frederick William Bartlett, Principal Clerk, Pay Office
- Cmdr. Frederick Mortimer Barwick, Royal Navy, Portmaster and Marine Superintendent, Great Central Railway
- Lt.-Col. William Fortescue Basset, Ministry of National Service
- Capt. Ernest William Bastard, British Steam Shipping Company
- Muriel Bather, Vice-President and Commandant, Cyngfield Auxiliary Hospital, Shrewsbury
- James Allan Battarsby, Clerk to the Guardians, Nottingham; Honorary Sec. of the Local Representative Committee, and Sec. of the Local War Pensions Committee
- Edith, Lady Baxter, Honorary Representative of the Ministry of Pensions, Central Scotland
- Peter McLeod Baxter, Engineering Partner, Messrs. McKie & Baxter, Govan
- Willoughby Lake Baylay, Manager, Birmingham Small Arms Company, Ltd., Birmingham
- Ernest Edward Boyle Beamer, Superintendent of Registry, Home Office
- Joseph James Beard, Acting Chief Accountant in the War Office
- George Howard Beaton, Managing Director, Messrs. G. Beaton & Son, London
- Clara Constance Beausire, Vice-President, Birkenhead Division, British Red Cross and Order of St. John of Jerusalem
- Alfred Bednell, Sec., Coventry Munitions Board of Management
- Susan Heard Beevor, Donor and Commandant, Hoveton Hall Auxiliary Hospital, Wrexham, Norfolk
- Hubert Dowson Bell, Head of the Wheat Section of the Commercial Services Branch, Ministry of Shipping
- William Thomas Bell, Messrs. Robey & Company, Lincoln
- Geoffrey Thomas Bennett FRS Fellow and Mathematical Lecturer, Emmanuel College, Cambridge; Scientific Assistant, Compass Dept., Admiralty. Algernon Edward Berriman, Chief Engineer, Daimler Company, Ltd.
- William Lewis Berrow ISO Registrar, Foreign Office
- Alys Mary Bertie-Perkins, Sec. and Organizer, Swansea District, British Red Cross Society
- Francis George Lawder Bertram, Secretarial Ofc., Ministry of Munitions
- Rosamond Bertram-Corbet, Lady Superintendent, Grosvenor Gardens Y.M.C.A. Hut
- Henry Bucknall Betterton, Liaison Ofc. between the War Trade Intelligence Dept. and the Admiralty, War Office and Ministry of Munitions
- Herbert Bing, Managing Director, Banbury National Filling Factory, Ministry of Munitions
- Oswell Barritt Binns, Section Director, Gun Ammunition
- Manufacture, Ministry of Munitions
- John Bissett, Sec., Manchester Munitions Cooperative Board of Management
- Lt. David Blair, Royal Naval Reserve
- Frank Blake, Partner, Messrs. W. E. Blake, Explosives Loading Co., London
- Constance Caldwell Bloomfield, Lady Superintendent, Empire Union Club for Soldiers and Sailors
- Clara Blount, Commandant, Stildon House Auxiliary Hospital, East Grinstead, Sussex
- James Cairns Bogle JP Provost of Falkirk; Chairman of Local Tribunal
- Henry Patrick Bolaud, Secretarial Ofc., Ministry of Munitions
- William Bonney, Naval Store Ofc., H.M. Dockyard, Portsmouth
- Harry Booth, Principal Clerk, Harbour Dept., Board of Trade
- John Oliver Borley, Superintendent Naturalist Inspector in Fisheries Division of the Board of Agriculture
- Percy Dunville Botterell, Assistant Commercial Attaché to His Britannic Majesty's Legation, Holland
- William Cecil Bottomley, Principal Clerk, Colonial Office
- John Bourdeaux, Submarine Superintendent, General Post Office
- Sarah Fanny, Llady Bowater, Organiser of Red Cross Work, Birmingham
- Frederick Gatus Bowers, Section Director, Finance Dept., Ministry of Munitions
- Thomas Anderson Bowman, Chief Engineer, Prince Line, Ltd.
- William Turnbull Bowman, Assistant Director, Central Stores Dept., Ministry of Munitions
- Harry Robert Boyd, Late Assistant Private Sec., Home Office
- Sydney Edward Boyland, Royal Corps of Naval Constructors
- Hugh Bramwell, Member of Colliery Recruiting Court, South Wales; Member of Advisory Board to Controller of Coal Mines
- David Alexander Bremner, Late Head of Aluminium Section, Ministry of Munitions
- Edgar Brierley JP Chairman, Manchester Local Tribunal
- William Richard Brunskill Briscoe, Late Crown Prosecutor for Egypt
- Flight Cmdr. Frank Arthur Brock, Royal Naval Air Service
- Archibald Brown, Commandant, Liverpool Special Constabulary
- Jonathan Boswell Brown, Wilfred Gordon Brown, Legal Assistant, Ministry of Munitions
- Jeffrey Browning ISO Assistant Sec. to the Board of Customs and Excise
- Charles Matthewes Bruce, Acting Assistant Accountant-General of the Navy
- Ellen Maud, Lady Bruce, Vice-President and Organizer of West Bridgford Auxiliary Hospital, Nottinghamshire
- Frederick Bryant, Royal Corps of Naval Constructors
- Jane Buchanan, Superintendent (Female Staff), Post Office Savings Bank Dept.
- Joseph Andrew William Buchanan, Comptroller of Accounts, H.M. Office of Works
- Alfred Virgoe Buckland, Deputy Chief Valuer and Compensation Officer, Directorate of Lands, Ministry of Munitions
- Walter Henry Bulpitt, Managing Director of Messrs. Bulpitt, Ltd., Birmingham
- Maj. Frederick Burch, Home Forces Staff
- Kenneth Paul Burgess, Deputy Head of the Technical Services Branch, Ministry of Shipping
- Hubert Francis Daubeny Burke, Section Director, Central Stores Dept., Ministry of Munitions
- May Burke, Commandant, Urmston and Fairfield Auxiliary Hospitals, Eastbourne
- The Hon. Ethel Louise Burn, Commandant and Matron, Stoodley Knowle Auxiliary Hospital, Torquay
- Ethel Burnett, Vice-President, Kincardineshire, Scottish Branch, British Red Cross Society
- Ethel Margaret Burnside, Assistant County Director, Hertfordshire, British Red Cross and Order of St. John of Jerusalem
- William Parker Burton JP Vice-Chairman, Flour Mills Control Committee
- Margery Bush, Bishop's Knoll Auxiliary Hospital, Bristol
- Squadron-Cmdr. Henry Richard Busteed, Royal Naval Air Service
- Arthur Francis Butler, Section Director of Labour Supply Dept., Ministry of Munitions
- William John Cable, Sec. of the Central Council of United Alien Relief Societies
- Elizabeth Mary Cadbury
- Lily Eliza Frances, Lady Caillard, Donor, Wingfield Auxiliary Hospital, Trowbridge, Wiltshire
- Percy Pyne Caldecott-Smith Chief Surveyor, Director of Works Dept., Admiralty
- Mary Louisa Caldwell, Divisional Sec. and Deputy County Director, British Red Cross and Order of St. John of Jerusalem; Lady Superintendent of Minley Auxiliary Hospital, Hampshire
- Philip Cambray, Private Sec. to the Minister of National Service
- Joan Jessie Cameron, Organiser of Scottish Work, Munition Workers Welfare Committee, Y.W.C.A.
- Alexander Campbell, Managing Director, Hunslet Engine Company, Ltd., Leeds
- Florence Ishbel Campbell, Organising Sec., Munition Workers' Welfare Committee, Y.W.C.A.
- Gordon Charles Henry Campbell, Section Director of Labour RegulationDept., Ministry of Munitions
- Athol John Capron, Managing Director, Messrs. Davey Bros., Sheffield
- Mary Gertrude Carden, Honorary Sec., Women's Patrol Service, National Union of Women Workers
- Frederick Carl, Sec., National Egg Collection Committee
- Walter Carlile DL JP Organising Ofc., Buckinghamshire Special Constabulary
- William Allan Carter JP Town Councillor of Edinburgh; Member n of Local Tribunal
- Edward Henry Carter, His Majesty's Inspector of Schools
- Maud Cator, Donor and Commandant, Woodbastwick Hall Auxiliary Hospital, Norwich
- Squadron Cmdr. Robert Arthur Chalmers, Royal Naval Air Service
- John Alfred Cuthbert Champion, Civil Assistant to Controller, Admiralty
- Maj. Samuel Stewart Champion JP Area Headquarters Recruiting Ofc., Birmingham
- Edward David Chetham-Strode, Legal Assistant, Ministry of Munitions
- Dehra Chichester, Vice-President of St. John's Voluntary Aid Detachments for Belfast
- Henry Churchill, Commercial Dept., Foreign Office
- Maj. William Henry Dennis Clark, Munitions Inventions Dept.
- Geoffrey Rothe Clarke, Late Statistical Ofc., Inspection Dept., Ministry of Munitions
- James Alexander Clarke, Chairman of the Local Tribunal of the County of Ayr
- John Courtenay Clarke, Acting Assistant Director of Contracts, Admiralty
- Col. Henry Clay, Deputy Director of Recruiting, Eastern Command
- Robert Clay JP Clerk to the Guardians, Shoreditch
- Harris Peugeot Cleaver, Clerk to the Guardians, West Derby
- Andrew Cochrane, Managing Director, Messrs. Cochrane & Sons, Ltd., Selby
- George Bertram Cockburn, Inspector of Aeroplanes, Aeronautical Inspection Directorate
- William Coggan, Technical Adviser (Hides & Skins) to the War Office
- William George Cole, Chief Constructor, H.M. Dockyard, Sheerness
- Richard James Coles, Assistant Director of Finance, Ministry of Pensions
- Lt.-Cmdr. John Alsager Collett, Royal Navy
- Capt. Reginald Blayney Colmore, Royal Navy
- Capt. Superintendent of the Training Ship Exmouth
- Arthur Douglas Constable, Superintending Electrical Engineers Dept., Admiralty
- Elizabeth Cooper, Honorary Sec. and Treasurer of the Milford Haven and South Wales Minesweepers Comforts Supply Association
- Ernest Napier Cooper, Superintending Aliens Ofc.
- Harry Stowe Coppock, Manager, Messrs. Sir W. G. Armstrong, Whitworth & Company, Ltd., Elswick
- Mary Caroline Coulcher, Vice-President and Lady District Superintendent, St. John Ambulance Brigade; Commandant, Broadwater Auxiliary Hospital, Suffolk
- Fulwar Cecil Ashton Coventry, Section Director, Inland Transport Dept., Ministry of Munitions
- Jane Cowen, Bernard Henry Cox, Senior Clerk, Exchequer and Audit Dept.
- Oswald Cox, Inspector of Gun Ammunition (Technical), Ministry of Munitions
- William Brownfield Craig, Assistant County Director, Totnes Division, British Red Cross and Order of St. John of Jerusalem
- John McGregor Cramond, Assistant Divisional Ofc. for Scotland Division, Employment Exchanges
- Florentia Maria Crawshay, Vice-President and Commandant, St. Anne's Hall Auxiliary Hospital, Caversham, Berkshire
- Laura Alexander Bell Cree, Convener of Headquarters Organising Clothing Committee and Stores and Despatch Committee of the Scottish Branch, British Red Cross Society
- Ernest Samuel Croft, Acting Assistant Accountant-General of the Navy
- Claud Crompton, Inspector, Small Arms Ammunition, Ministry of Munitions
- Edward Cropper, Architect, First Class, H.M. Office of Works
- Marjorie Crosbie-Hill, Organiser of Canteens and Clubs, Munition Workers Welfare Committee, Y.W.C.A.
- Josiah Crosby, His Britannic Majesty's Consul, Senaggora
- Richard Basil Cross, Private Sec., Local Government Board
- Clifford William Croysdill, Superintendent of Royal Victoria Yard, Deptford
- Herbert Edmond Cuff FRCS Principal Medical Ofc. to the Metropolitan Asylums Board
- James William Henry Culling, Assistant Director of Victualling, Admiralty
- Herbert Ashley Cunard Cummins, Chargé d'Affaires at His Britannic Majesty's Legation in Mexico
- Paymaster-in-Chief Henry Ashley Travel's Cummins, Royal Navy
- William Cunliffe JP Chairman, Rochdale Local Tribunal
- Capt. Frederick Joseph Cunnington, Chief Staff Ofc. to County Director, and Chief Transport Ofc., Middlesex, British Red Cross and Order of St. John of Jerusalem
- Kathleen Alice Cuthbert, Vice-President, British Red Cross Society, Northumberland
- Olive Cuthbertson FRS Contraband Dept., Foreign Office
- Capt. William John Dagnall, Commodore Capt., Royal Mail Steam Packet Co.
- Percy Gough Dallinger, Assistant Director, Supplies Division, Food Production Dept.
- Robert Washington Dana, Sec. of the Institution of Naval Architects
- James Stewart Davidson, Honorary Sec., County of Aberdeen War Work Association
- Cmdr. Andrew William Davies, Royal Navy, Chief Naval Censor, Press Bureau
- Lt.-Col. William Northcote Davis VD JP Chief Ofc., Slough Division, Buckinghamshire Special Constabulary
- Lt. Albert Edward Dawson RNVR Naval Intelligence Division, Admiralty
- Margaret Darner Dawson, Commandant of Women's Police Service
- Hervey Angus de Montmorency, Sec. to the Tonnage Priority Committee; Personal Assistant to the Director of Ship Requisitioning
- Frederick Walter Dendy DCL Vice-Chairman, Northumberland Appeal Tribunal (Newcastle Panel)
- Mark Thomas Denne, Section Director, Small Arms and Machine Guns Dept., Ministry of Munitions
- Cmdr. Alexander Guthrie Denniston RNVR Naval Intelligence Division, Admiralty
- Muriel Evelyn De Rougemont, Commandant, Coombe Lodge Auxiliary Hospital, Warley, Essex
- Henry Charles Dickens, Comm. under Military Service (Civil Liabilities) Committee
- Thomas Cantrel Dillon His Majesty's Consul, Porto Alegre, Brazil
- George Morton Discombe, Acting Assistant Director of Stores, Admiralty
- Gertrude Caroline Dixon Sec., Wheat Executive, Ministry of Food
- William Vibart Dixon, Deputy Clerk, Yorkshire West Riding County Council; Clerk to Yorkshire West Riding (Eastern Central) Appeal Tribunal
- James Downs JP Cmdr., Hull Special Constabulary
- Margaret Dudgeon, Vice-President and Acting President, Stewartry of Kirkcudbright, Scottish Branch, British Red Cross Society
- Mildred Mabel Gordon Duff, President, Banffshire, Scottish Branch, British Red Cross Society
- George Chester Duggian, Military Sea Transport Branch, Ministry of Shipping
- Leland Lewis Duncan MVO Chief Examiner and Acting Assistant Principal, War Office
- Malcolm James Rowley Dunstan, Food Production Comm. for Kent and Surrey; Principal of the South Eastern Agricultural College, Wye
- Percy Durant, Manager, Paris Office of Ministry of Munitions
- Sir Arthur Isaac Durant MVO Controller of Supplies, H.M. Office of Works
- William Moore Dyball, District Superintendent, Brighton, London, Brighton and South Coast Railway
- Edward Jerome Dyer MBE Honorary General Sec. of the Vegetable Products Committee for Naval Supply
- Stephen Eastern JP Chairman, Newcastle Local Tribunal
- John Edmond, Chairman of Stirling Local Tribunal
- Lt. Cmdr. Leslie Wynn Edmunds RNVR
- David John William Edwardes
- Charles James Edwards, Finance Branch Ministry of Shipping
- George Henry Edwards, Private Sec. to the Comm. of Metropolitan Police
- James Eggar, Principal Clerk, H.M. Office of Works
- Edwin Charles Eldred, Chief of the Staff of the War Trade Dept.
- Capt. Frederick Barnard Elliot
- Freight Manager, Royal Commission on Wheat Supplies
- John Henry Ellis, Late Town Clerk of Plymouth and Clerk to the Plymouth Local Tribunal
- Thomas Elvy Elvy, Engineering Assistant to Director of Dockyards and Repairs, Admiralty
- John Emberton JP Chairman, Cheshire War Agricultural Executive Committee
- Lt. Corris William Evans, Private Sec. to the Director of Transports and Shipping
- Maj. Herbert Evans, Principal Clerk, Ministry of Pensions
- Thomas Henry Rovston Evans JP Chairman of Fulham Local Tribunal
- Basil Preston Everett, Head of Drawing Office, Air Board, Technical Dept.
- William Herbert Lee Ewart, Telegram Dept. Foreign Office
- Robert Crosbie Farmer Research Dept., Woolwich
- Herbert Ernest Fass, Senior Examiner, Board of Education
- Frederick J. Fedarb, Sec. in Charge, Y.M.C.A., Salisbury Plain
- Dora Fielden, Commandant of Auxiliary Hospital, Kineton, Warwickehire
- Henry Foreman, Mayor of Hammersmith
- Lady Mary Forster, Dowager Duchess of Hamilton, Donor and Commandant, Easton Hall Auxiliary Hospital, Wickham Market, Suffolk
- Cecil Lewis Fortescue, Professor of Physics, Royal Navy College, Greenwich
- Harold Augustus Fortingiton, Raw Materials Branch of Requirements and Statistics Dept., Ministry of Munitions
- James Foster, Chief Engineer, W. and C. T. Jones Steamship Company, Ltd.
- Joseph Francis JP Mayor of Southend-on-Sea; Chairman, of Local Tribunal
- Leonard Benjamin Franklin, Robert Francis Franklin, Sec. to the Admiral Superintendent, H.M. Dockyard, Devonport
- Lt. Thomas Frazer, Technical Assistant in Statistics Dept., Ministry of National Service
- Robert Freeman, Technical Assistant, Surveyor-General of Supplies Dept., War Office
- The Hon. Essex Eleonor Ffrench, Honorary Sec., Almeric Paget Military Massage Corps
- Henry Leon French, General Sec., Food Production Dept.
- Reginald Thomas George French, Munitions Inventions Dept.
- E. J. Allan Frost, Sec. in Charge, Aldershot Division, Y.M.C.A.
- Mark Edwin Pesoott Frost ISO Sec. to the Admiral Superintendent, H.M. Dockyard, Portsmouth
- David Bowie Fulton, Section Director, Central Stores Dept., Ministry of Munitions
- William Raledsrh Kerr Gandell, Divisional Director in the Dept. of Commercial Intelligence, Board of Trade
- Lt.-Cmdr. Eric Worsley Gandy RNVR
- Annie Elizabeth Gardner, Senior Organising Ofc. for Women's Work, London and South-Eastern Division, Employment Exchanges
- Edward Theodore Gardom, Clerk to the Gloucestershire County Council; Clerk to the Gloucestershire Appeal Tribunal
- Lt. John William Frederick Garvey RNVR
- George Gentry, Capt. James German, Ministry of National Service
- William Doig Gibb, Consulting Gas Engineer to Explosives Supply Dept., Ministry of Munitions
- Joseph Hamilton Gibson, Mamagier of Engineering Dept., Messrs. Cammell, Laird & Company, Ltd.; Member of Committee of tihe Board of Inventions and Research, Admiralty
- John Watson Gibson, Late in charge of Production of Shells, Guns and Small Arms Ammunition in U.S.A., Ministry of Munitions
- William John Gick, Naval Store Ofc., Grand Fleet
- Archibald Gilchrist JP Engineering Managing Director, Messrs. Barclay, Curie & Company Limited, Glasgow
- John Gledhill, Naval Ordnance Store Ofc., Crombie
- William James Glenny, Chief Staff Ofc., Commercial Intelligence Dept., Board of Trade
- James Thomas Goalen, Bailie of the Burgh of Leith
- Lionel Frederic Goldsmid, Finance Branch, Ministry of Shipping
- Edward Gomersall, Superintending Engineer, General Post Office
- Gertrude Esperance Goodsir, Administrator and Donor, Wallacefield Auxiliary Hospital, Coombe Lane, South Croydon, Surrey
- Col. Henry Erskine Gordon, Ex-Convener of Renfrewshire; Member of the Local Tribunal
- William James Gordon, Engine Designer and Indoor Manager, Messrs. Tickers, Ltd., Barrow
- Thomas Gowans, Senior Chief Engineer, Pacific Steam Navigation Company
- Warden Gowing, Clerk, Munitions Tribunal, London
- Mary Louise, Marchioness of Graham, Vice-President, Plomesgate Division, British Red Cross and Order of St. John of Jerusalem; Donor, Easton Hall, Auxiliary Hospital, Suffolk.
- Allan Graham, Commercial Adviser to His Majesty's Legation at Copenhagen
- Arthur John Wood Graham, Inspector of Munitions Areas, Newcastle
- Capt. John Irvine Graham, Royal Navy, Inspector General of Customs Waterguard
- Selwyn Seafield Grant, Superintending Engineer, Ministry of Munitions, No. 7 Area (Metropolis and S.E. England)
- Lt. William Grant RNVR Fishery Capt., Grimsby
- William Grant, Chief Engineer, Anchor Line
- Maj. John Grapes, Senior Assistant to Col. in Charge of Records, Army Service Corps
- Robert Gray
- Edward William Green, Messrs. Green and Silley, Weir
- Mary Anne Green, Commandant, Wardown Auxiliary Hospital, Bedfordshire
- Lt. Donald McNeill Greig, Supply Ofc. in Aeroplane Supply Branch, Air Board
- The Hon. Mabel Elizabeth Georgiana Greville, Vice-President, Chelmsford Division, British Red Cross and Order of St. John of Jerusalem; Chairman of Red Cross Depot, Essex
- Sarah Gilbert Griffiths, Commandant and in Charge of Transport, Bristol, British Red Cross and Order of St. John of Jerusalem.
- Richard Henry Grimbly MRCS Assistant County Director, Ashburton Division, British Red Cross and Order of St. John of Jerusalem; Deputy Comm. of St. John, Devonshire
- Wilfrid Grimshaw, Section Director, Contracts Dept., Ministry of Munitions
- Maj. Harold Grinsted, Chief Engineer, Royal Aircraft Factory
- William Edward Gundill
- Godfrey Digby Napier Haggard, Chargé d'Affaires at His Britannic Majesty's Legation in Bolivia
- William Thomas Hanman, Assistant Director, Factory Construction, Ministry of Munitions
- Jane Ewing Hannay
- Alfred John Harding, First Class Clerk, Colonial Office
- Samuel Hare JP Member of Colliery Recruiting Court, South Durham
- John Allen Harker FRS Munitions Inventions Dept.
- Ernest Alfred Harris, Collector, Long Room, Custom House
- Emily Margaret Harrison
- Richard Frederick Hartley, Controller of Small Arms Ammunition Factory, Woolwich Arsenal
- Vernon Hartshorn JP South Wales Miners Federation; Member of Coal Mining Organization Committee; Member of Advisory Board to Controller of Coal Mines; Member of Colliery Recruiting Court, South Wales
- Theodore Edward Hart-Smith, Section Director, Dept. of Area Organization, Ministry of Munitions
- Ada Sophia Lucy Hatfield, Lady Sec. at Headquarters, Y.M.C.A.
- Cyril George Hatherley, Inspector of Munitions Areas, Glasgow
- Maj. Charles Hebert, Design Dept., Ministry of Munitions
- Cmdr. Philip Herbert RNVR
- Charles Heron-Watson, Comm. for Sutherlandshire Boy Scouts
- Charles James Higginson, Sec. of the Restriction of Enemy Supplies Dept.
- George Edward Hilleary, Town Clerk of West Ham
- Percy John Hinks, Controller of Filling Factories, Woolwich Arsenal
- Albert Ernest Hoare JP Honorary Sec. and Treasurer of Suffolk Branch, British Red Cross and Order of St. John of Jerusalem
- Lt. John Hodgens RNVR
- Charles Courtenay Hodgson, Clerk to the Cumberland County Council; Clerk to the Cumberland and Westmorland Appeal Tribunal
- John Alexander Hodgson, Late Chief Engineer, H.M. Dockyard, Sheerness
- The Hon. Elizabeth Odeyne Hodgson, Sec. and Commandant of Clopton War Hospital, Town Hall, Stratford, Warwickshire
- Capt. Norman Edward Holden, Late Deputy Director-General, Mechanical Warfare, Ministry of Munitions
- Julia Holland, Donor and Commandant of Auxiliary Hospital, Brand Lodge, Colwall, Malvern
- Alfred Ewart Holly, Manager of H.M. Factory, Oldbury, Ministry of Munitions
- Constance Holmes, Lady Inspector, Army Pay Dept.
- Cmdr. Gerard-Hobert Addison Holmes RNVR
- William Holmes, Accountant in the War Office
- Frederic Home, Food Production Comm. for Devon, Cornwall and Somerset
- Frederick James Howard, Section Director, Finance Dept., Ministry of Munitions
- Godfrey Valentine Howell, Head of the Shipping Intelligence Section, Ministry of Snipping
- Arthur Hughes, of the Firm of Messrs. Hughes and Son, Ltd., Opticians
- Aubrey Patrick Hughes-Gibb, Private Sec. to the Food Controller
- Gilbert Humphreys, Deputy Controller, Gun Ammunition Manufacture, Ministry of Munitions
- John Hunt, Town Clerk of Westminster, Clerk to the Westminster Local Tribunal
- Joseph Hunt ISO Deputy Civil Assistant, Woolwich Arsenal
- Thomas Charles Hunter, Superintending Civil Engineer, Director of Works Dept., Admiralty
- Alan Hutchings, Chief Personal Assistant to the DirectorGeneral of Voluntary Organisations
- Arthur Hutchinson, Fellow of Pembroke College, Cambridge; University Demonstrator of Mineralogy
- Emily Fenton Arrnitage Hutton, Commandant, Brookdale Auxiliary Hospital, Alderley Edge, Cheshire
- William George Hynard, Head of the Collier Section, Ministry of Shipping
- Louis Infeld, War Trade Statistical Dept.
- William Edward Ireland, Late Chief Engineer, Metropolitan Munition Committee
- Lt. Cmdr. Thomas Cutlhbert Irwin RNVR
- Harold Benjamin Jacks, Late Head of High Speed Steel Section, Raw Materials Branch, Ministry of Munitions
- John Jackson, Trades Comm. of the National Service Dept., and Technical Adviser to the Reserved Occupations Committee
- Laura Jackson, Vice-President, Solihull Division, British Red Cross and Order of St. John of Jerusalem; Donor, Norton Cottage and Springfield Auxiliary Hospitals, Warwickshire
- George Charles James, Principal Clerk and Rating Surveyor to the Corporation of London; Clerk to the City of London Tribunal
- Henry Charles Jefferies, Late Sec. to Advisory Committee, Controlled Establishments Branch, Ministry of Munitions
- William Douglas Johnston, Principal Technical Ofc., Fish Supplies Branch, Ministry of Food
- Arthur Jones, Superintendent, Remount Depot, Worcester
- Arthur Dansey Jones, Locomotive Running Superintendent, South-Eastern and Chatham Railway
- Patrick Nicholas Hill Jones, Inspector of Gun Ammunition (Supervisory) London, Metropolitan Area, Ministry of Munitions
- Samuel Nathan Jones, Chairman, Monmouthshire War Agricultural Executive Committee
- Lt. Theodore Warren Jones RNR
- John Francis Jones, Adviser to Contraband Dept. on Wool Questions
- Andrew Cassels Kay, Assistant Charity Comm.
- Sydney Herbert Kaye, Sec. of the Plate Refrigerated Tonnage Committee
- Rupert Hales Headlam Keenlyside, Section Director of Labour Regulation Dept., Ministry of Munitions
- Alfred Evans Kelly, Chief Engineer, Tatem Steam Navigation Company
- Elizabeth Hariott Kelly MBE War Pensions Committee and Portsmouth Local Charities, Portsmouth
- The Reverend John Kelman Y.M.C.A. Worker
- Cmdr. Hubert Wynn Kenrick RD Royal Naval Reserve Shipping Intelligence Ofc., London
- Lady Anne Kerr, County Director and Vice-President for Midlothian, Scottish Branch, British Red Cross Society
- Samuel Kidner, Member of the President of the Board of Agriculture's Food Production Dept. Advisory Committee
- Arthur Ernest Kimpton, Sec. to the Admiral Superintendent, H.M. Dockyard, Chatham
- Mary Liddon King, Commandant and Vice President, Standish Auxiliary Hospital, Stonehouser Gloucestershire
- The Hon. Emily Kinnaird, Director of Appeal, Munition Workers' Welfare Committee, Y.W.C.A.
- Arthur Ernest Kirkus, Statistical Dept., Admiralty
- William Dennett Kirkwood, Superintending Engineer, Ministry of Munitions, No. 9 Area (W. Scotland)
- Matthew Kissane, Assistant Director of Materials and Priority, Controller's Dept., Admiralty
- Christopher Newman Knight, Section Director, Contracts Branch, Air Board
- Constance Mary, Lady Knowles, Vice-President of Camberley Division, British Red Cross and Order of St. John; Commandant of Camberley Auxiliary Hospital, Surrey
- Edwin Max Konstam, Assistant Director, Local Organisation Division, Food Production Dept.
- Herman Landau, Chairman of the Jewish Refugees Committee
- Evelyn Louisa Lascelles, Commandant, Auxiliary Hospital, Grove House, Harrogate
- George Philip Langton, Section Director of Labour Supply Dept., Ministry of Munitions
- Clement Martin le Breton KC Comm. under Military Service (Civil Liabilities) Committee
- James Crawford Ledlie, Chief Clerk, and Deputy Clerk of the Council, Privy Council Office
- John William Lee, Commandant and Organiser of Transport in Lincolnshire, British Red Cross and Order of St. John of Jerusalem
- Alice Gwynllyan Lee-Williams, Commandant, Auxiliary Hospital, Gloucester
- Henry Aufrere Leggett, First Class Clerk, Local Government Board
- Lady Ada Edwina Stewart Lewin, Acting Commandant, Ascot Auxiliary Military Hospital, Berkshire
- Herbert David William Lewis, Deputy Comm. for the Order of St. John of Jerusalem in South Wales
- Ruth Lewis, Lady Superintendent, Earl Street Y.M.C.A.
- Alan Wadsworth Lidderdale, Contraband Dept., Foreign Office
- Tinsley Lindley Chief Ofc., Nottingham Special Constabulary
- James Brown Lindsay, Cashier. H.M. Dockyard, Chatham
- Staff Paymaster James Scott Little, Royal Naval Reserve
- Capt. Arthur Athelwold Lloyd DSO Sec., Sussex Territorial Force Association
- George Richard Boycott Loch, Section Director, Contracts Dept., Ministry of Munitions
- John Lomax DL JP Sec., Merioneth and Montgomery Territorial Force Association
- William Low, Acting Convener of Fifeshire; Member of Appeal Tribunal
- Thomas Martin Lowry FRS Technical Adviser on Amatol, Ministry of Munitions
- Mildred Lowther, Lady Superintendent, Army Pay, Dept.
- Maj. Edward James Lugard DSO Naval Intelligence Division
- Charles Lupton, Ex-Lord Mayor of Leeds
- Capt. Robert J. MacAlpine, Member of British Military Equipments Section in Russia, Ministry of Munitions
- Thomas Symington Macaulay, Provost of the Burgh of Dumfries; Chairman of Local Tribunal
- George William MacDonald, Chief Chemist to Messrs. Curtis and Harvey, Ltd.
- James Macdonald, Chief Engineer, Cunard Steamship Co., Ltd.
- Sheena Macdonald, Sec., St. Marylebone Division, British Red Cross and Order of St. John of Jerusalem
- Hugh Macfarlane, Manager, Singer Manufacturing Company, Limited, Glasgow
- Peter Macfarlane JP Provost of Port Glasgow
- Finlay Matheson Mackenzie JP
- John Mackintosh, Section Director, Trench Warfare Supply Dept., Ministry of Munitions
- William MacLennan JP Chairman of Local Tribunal, Kirkwall
- Charles Henry MacLintock, Section Director, Finance Dept. Ministry of Munitions
- Henry William Macrosty, Assistant Director of the Census of Production, Board of Trade
- Capt. Edmund Distin Maddick FRCS
- Mary Sybil Mainwaring, Part Donor and Commandant, Trimpley Hall Auxiliary Hospital, Ellesmere, Shropshire
- Jessy Mair, Head of Bacon Distribution Section, Ministry of Food
- Albany Featherstonehaugh Major, Principal Clerk in the War Office
- Frederick Henry Dumas Man, Senior Partner of Messrs. E. D. and F. Man, Mincing Lane
- Arthur Woodroffe Manton, Late in Charge of Production of Lewis Guns, Copper Driving Bands, Brass Rods, etc., in U.S.A., Ministry of Munitions
- Charles William Maplesden, Assistant Director of Barrack Construction, War Office
- Winifred Marsden, Commandant, Colliton Auxiliary Hospital, Dorchester
- Ernest William Marsh, General Manager of Woolcombers, Ltd.; Chairman of the Woolcombers Federation
- The Hon. Joan Marsham, Lady Superintendent, Queen Mary Y.M.C.A. Hostel for Ofc.s and Y.M.C.A. Hut, Sloane Square
- Charles Selwyn Martin, Assistant Director of Horticulture and Head of Food Preserving Section, Food Production Dept.
- Hubert Stanley Martin, Chief Passport Ofc., Foreign Office
- Alexander Neil Mason, First Class Manager, Leeds Employment Exchange
- James Matson, Chief Investigation Ofc. for Scotland, Ministry of Munitions
- Arthur Matthews, Manager, Messrs. Sir W. G. Armstrong, Whitworth & Company, Ltd., Openshaw
- Thomas Leigh Matthews, Late Section Director, Dept. of Area Organization, Ministry of Munitions
- Percy Matthey JP Managing Director, Messrs. Johnson, Matthey and Co., Ltd., London
- Capt. Leslie Blythe Maxwell, Ofc. Commanding Friends Ambulance Unit, France and Belgium
- Richard Cowdy Maxwell Inspector, Local Government Board
- Katharine Edith May, Sec., Hampstead Division, British Red Cross and Order of St. John of Jerusalem; Donor and Administrator, Cedar Lawn Auxiliary Hospital, Hampstead
- Frances McAdam, Commandant, Greenhill Auxiliary Hospital, Sherborne
- James McCaffery, Superintending Electrical Engineer's Dept., Admiralty
- Charles Home McCall, Section Director, Raw Materials Dept., Ministry of Munitions
- John McCann, Chairman of the Hull Fishing Vessel Owners Association, and Port Fishery Capt.
- Robert McCann, Headquarters-Staff, Y.M.C.A.
- William McClelland, Electrical Engineering Assistant to Director of Dockyards and Repairs, Admiralty
- Lt.-Cmdr. William Holdsworth McConnel RNVR
- Dept. of the Director of Torpedoes and Mining, Admiralty
- Thomas McEwen, Traffic Manager, Highland Railway
- Andrew McFarlane, Acting Assistant Superintendent of Ordnance Stores
- Joseph McFarlane, Chief Engineer, Donaldson Line
- Howard Addison McFerran, Chief Engineer, H.M. Office of Works
- James McGowan
- John James McKeown, Manager, Messrs. Vickers, Limited, Barrow
- Richard McLaren, of the Firm of Messrs. Babcock & Wilcox, Ltd.
- Capt. Peter McLean, Anchor Line, Ltd.
- Capt. Neil McNeil, Ellerman City Line
- Gilbert McPherson, General Manager, Georgetown Filling Factory, Ministry of Munitions
- Wilfrid Medd, Accountant-General's Dept., Admiralty
- Alexander James Pople Menzies, Sheriff Substitute of Caithness; Chairman of Appeal Tribunal
- George Babbington Michell, His Britannic Majesty's Consul, Para.
- William Millar, Head of the Greenock and Grangemouth Dockyard Company
- Arnold Henry Miller, Town Clerk of Norwich; Clerk to the Local Tribunal
- Frank Lawrence Miller, Assistant Chief of Section, Central Office, Employment Dept., Ministry of Labour
- Arthur Noel Mobbs, Assistant Director, Mechanical Cultivation Division, Food Production Dept.
- James Moffat JP Provost of the Burgh of Forfar
- Alexander Moir, Metropolitan Superintending Engineer, General Post Office
- Thomas Fell Molyneux, District Superintendent (London), London and South Western Railway
- Frederick William Moneypenny MVO Sec. to the Lord Mayor of Belfast
- Maj. Charles Babington Smith Monfries, Finance Sec. to the Commission Internationale de Ravitaillement
- David Taylor Monteith, Deputy Director of Naval Sea Transport Branch, Ministry of Shipping
- Evelyn Moore, Organiser of Canteens, Hostels and Clubs, Munition Workers Welfare Committee, Y.W.C.A.
- Harold Moore, Research Dept., Woolwich Arsenal
- Jasper Frederick More, Military Intelligence Branch, War Office
- Charles Morgan, His Britannic Majesty's Consul, Rome
- Henry Morris, Superintendent of Royal Clarence Yard, Gosport.
- Col. John Morrison MVO VD JP Chairman of Local Tribunal, Golspie, Sutherland
- George A. Morrow, Director of Aviation, Imperial Munitions Board, Canada
- Owen Edward Mott Head Chemist at H.M. Factory, Oldbury, Ministry of Munitions
- George Frederick Mulherion, Managing Director of the Tyne Iron Shipbuilding Company, Ltd.
- William Murison, County Clerk of Aberdeenshire
- Howard Murray, Chairman of Explosives Committee, Imperial Munitions Board, Canada
- James Murray, Chairman, Surrey War Agricultural Executive Committee
- Thomas Roberts Murray, Managing Director of Messrs. Spencer & Company, Ltd., Melksham
- William Nash
- Ethel Nest Newall, Commandant and Organiser of Auxiliary Hospital, Dilston Hall, Corbridge; Commandant of Auxiliary Hospital, Northumberland 22
- Leonard Newitt, Electrical Engineer, H.M. Dockyard, Chatham
- Archibald Newlands, Engineer and Sec., Dundee Munitions Board of Management
- Florence Jane Helen, Dowager Baroness Nunburnholme, Donor, Naval Hospital, Hull
- Francis George Nutt, Accountant-General's Dept., Admiralty
- Wing-Cmdr. Alec Ogilvie, Royal Naval Air Service, Head of Aeroplane Design Section, Air Board Technical Dept.
- James George O'Keefe, War Office and Ministry of Munitions Financial Representative in U.S.A
- Reta Oldham, Chairman of Headmistresses Committee for Inspecting Girls from Secondary Schools for Employment at War Office
- John William Lambton Oliver, Naval Store Ofc., H.M. Dockyard, Devonport
- Philip Milner Oliver, County Sec., East Lancashire, British Red Cross and Order of St. John of Jerusalem
- Jonathan Orchard, Deputy Chief Inspector, Customs and Excise
- Frederic Stanley Osgood MVO Clerk of the Central Chancery of Orders of Knighthood
- Henry Overman JP
- Lt.-Cmdr. Henry Edward Clarence Paget RNVR
- Marian Palmer. District Superintendent and Commandant, Auxiliary Hospital, Whinney House, Gateshead
- Philip Palmer, Royal Corps of Naval Constructors
- Winnie Pardoe, Organiser and Commandant, St. John Hospital, Barry Island, Glamorgan
- Thomas Park, First Class Manager, Shoreditch Employment Exchange
- George Phillips Parker JP Mayor of Holborn; Chairman, Holborn Local Tribunal
- Owen Parker JP Chairman of the Local Advisory Committee, Kettering
- Ethel Mary Parker-Jervis, Commandant, Sandon Hall Auxiliary Hospital, Staffordshire
- Harry Edgar Parlett, Assistant Director of Ship Repairs, Controller's Dept., Admiralty
- Clifford Copland Paterson, National Physical Laboratory
- Lt. Thomas Paterson, Inspector, Sheffield Special Constabulary
- Alexander Alan Paton, Assistant in the United States to the Trade Dept., Foreign Office (Declined honour)
- Robert G. Patterson, Member of the President of the Board of Agriculture's Food Production Dept. Advisory Committee
- C. L. Paus, Commercial Attaché, His Britannic Majesty's Legation, Norway
- Walter Payne, Section Director of Labour Regulation Dept., Ministry of Munitions
- Ernest Alfred John Pearce, Assistant Director of Warship Production, Controller's Dept., Admiralty
- Cmdr. Claud Pearce-Serocold RNVR Naval Intelligence Division
- Evelyn Pease, Commandant, Auxiliary Hospital, Richmond, North Yorkshire
- Lucy Victoria Pease, Commandant, Auxiliary Hospital, Red Barns, North Yorkshire
- Constance Dorothy Evelyn Peel, Joint Head of Women's Service Section in Food Economy Division, Ministry of Food
- Alice Louisa Pendarves, Deputy President, Cornwall, British Red Cross and Order of St. John of Jerusalem
- Emily Penrose, Principal of Somerville College, Oxford
- William Gordon Perrin, Sec. to the Fifth Sea Lord, Admiralty
- William Pettifor, Sec. to the Deputy Controller for Armament Production, Admiralty
- Eng.-Cmdr. Arthur Edward Philip RNR Senior Chief Engineer, Canadian Pacific Ocean Services
- Herbert Phillips, His Britannic Majesty's Consul, Shanghai
- Owen Surtees Phillpotts, Commercial Attaché, His Britannic Majesty's Legation, Sweden
- Edith Picton-Turbervill, Director of Appeal, Munition Workers Welfare Committee, Y.W.C.A.
- Mary Louisa Piercy, Organising Sec., Munitions Workers Welfare Committee, Y.W.C.A.
- Albert John Pitcher, Architect, First Class, H.M. Office of Works
- William Charles Platt, Assistant Clerk in Charge of Accounts, Home Office
- Annie Constance, Lady Plumer, Lady Superintendent, Aldwych Y.M.C.A. Hut
- Squadron-Cmdr. Charles Frederick Pollock, Royal Naval Air Service
- Augustus Frank Pool, First Class Surveyor of Taxes, Inland Revenue
- Herbert Porter, Section Director, Finance Dept., Ministry of Munitions
- Charles James Procter JP Y.M.C.A. Worker in Lancashire
- Walter Byron Prosser, Clerk to the Kent County Council; Clerk to the West Kent Appeal Tribunal
- William John Pulford, His Britannic Majesty's Consul, Tampico
- Edward Joseph Rabbit, Naval Store Ofc., H.M. Dockyard, Rosyth
- Francis Edward Raikes MVO Senior King's Foreign Messenger
- Andrew Agnew Ralston, Chairman of Local Tribunal, Philpstoun, West Lothian
- Lt.-Cmdr. James Randall RNVR Naval Intelligence Division
- Hugh Fraser Rankin, Sec. of the Butter and Cheese Advisory Committee and the Butter Import Committee, Ministry of Food
- Capt. Joseph Barlow Ranson, Senior Capt., White Star Line
- Constance Lilian Ratcliff, Commandant, Race Course Hospital, Cheltenham
- Henry Stephenson Ratcliffe, Director of Trade Negotiations, Shipyard Labour Dept., Admiralty
- Philip Bealby Reckitt JP Organiser, Reckitt's Auxiliary Hospital, Hull
- Frank William Reed, Director, Messrs. Craven Bros., Ltd., Stockport
- William Reed, Shipyard Manager at Smith's Dock Company, Ltd.
- W. Maxwell Reekie, Second Ofc., Manchester Special Constabulary
- James Daniel Rees, Senior Clerk, Exchequer and Audit Dept.
- Lt. Maurice Ambrose Regan RNVR Naval Transport Ofc., Hull; formerly Representative of Messrs. W. Mathwin and Son, Admiralty Coaling Agents at Hull
- George Reid Medical Ofc. of Health, Staffordshire County Council
- William George Riddell, Partner of Messrs. Hastie and Company, Ltd., Greenock
- Mary Stephanie Ridley, Vice-President, Wincanton District Somersetshire, British Red Cross and Order of St. John of Jerusalem
- Edmond John Riley, Assistant Principal and Assistant Director of Army Contracts, War Office
- Walter Lockhart Rind, Principal Clerk, Ministry of Pensions
- Hugh Ritchie, Prize Court Dept., Foreign Office
- Cmdr. Thomas Henry Roberts-Wray RNVR Executive Ofc., Royal Navy, Depot, Crystal Palace
- John Robertson Medical Ofc. of Health, Birmingham
- Lt.-Col. William Robertson VC Recruiting Staff Ofc., Edinburgh
- Edwin Robinson, Manager, Messrs. Vickers Ltd., Sheffield
- Roy Lister Robinson, Superintending Forestry Inspector, Board of Agriculture
- William Henry Robinson, Assistant in Financial Dept., Foreign Office
- Alliott Verdon Roe
- Capt. Tanner Montagu Rogers, Production Ofc., Aeroplane Supply Branch, Coventry District
- Muriel Augusta Gillian Rogers, President of Radnor Branch, British Red Cross and Order of St. John of Jerusalem; Commandant of Auxiliary Hospital No. 2, Radnor
- Noel Burn Rosher, Inspector of Munitions Areas, Birmingham
- Hugh Henderson Ross, Finance Branch, Ministry of Shipping
- Godfrey Rotter, Research Dept., Woolwich
- Christopher Foulis Roundell, Inspector, Local Government Board
- Amy Isabel, Lady Rowley, Vice-President of Guildford Division British Red Cross and Order of St. John of Jerusalem; Donor, Red Cross Annexe of Royal Surrey County Hospital.
- Frederick Henry Royce, Director and Chief Engineer, Rolls-Royce Ltd.
- Frank William Ruddle, Chief Engineer, White Star Line
- Norah Cecil Runge, Lady Superintendent, Free Buffet for Soldiers and Sailors, Paddington Station
- Frederick Vernon Russell, Superintendent of Operations, Great Eastern Railway
- John Russell Vice-President of Burslem and Tunstall Division, and Assistant County Director for the North Staffordshire Area, British Red Cross and Order of St. John of Jerusalem
- Annie Rutherford, Honorary Sec., North Riding of Yorkshire Branch, British Red Cross and Order of St. John of Jerusalem
- George Rutherford Thomson, Provost of Arbroath; Chairman of Local Tribunal
- John Ryan, Assistant Inspector of Dockyard Expense Accounts, Admiralty
- Louise Victoria Samuel, War Refugees Committee
- David Sandison, Provost of the Burgh of Wick
- Bertram Edward Sargeaunt, Clerk of the Council and Government Sec. and Treasurer, Isle of Man
- Frederick James Saunders
- District Stores Superintendent, Glasgow, Ministry of Munitions
- Edwin Savill, Member of the President of the Board of Agriculture's Food Production Dept. Advisory Committee
- Francis Ernest Saville, Chief Administration Ofc., Leeds Special Constabulary
- Albert Edwin Sawday JP Chairman of Leicester Local Tribunal
- Sidney Scott, Collector of Customs and Excise, Glasgow
- Cmdr. Thomas George Segrave, Royal Naval Reserve, Shipping Surveyor and Adviser, India Office
- George Bertrand Sharpies, Engineer and Director of Messrs. C. J. Wills and Sons, Ltd.
- Edward Burgess Sharpley, Town Clerk of Stoke-on-Trent; Clerk to the Local and Appeal Tribunal
- Fleet-Paymaster Edward Haweis Shearme, Royal Navy, Assistant Chief Censor, Admiralty
- Frank Sheppard, Lord Mayor of Bristol; Member of Bristol Local Tribunal
- William Alfred Thomas Shorto, Sec., Auxiliary Shipbuilding Dept., Admiralty
- Herbert John Simmonds, Sec. to the Advisory Committee to the Military Service'(Civil Liabilities) Committee
- Col. Robert Henville Simonds VD DL JP Sec., Dorset Territorial Force Association
- Sophia Flora Skipwith, Commandant, Loversall Auxiliary Hospital, Doncaster
- George Philip Skipworth, Assistant Commercial Attaché, His Britannic Majesty's Legation, Switzerland
- Alfred Smith, Managing Director, Messrs. Hattersley and Sons, Ltd., Kingsbury
- Charles Smith, Principal Clerk, Pay Office
- Ernest Wentworth Smith, Deputy Controller, Gauges Dept., Ministry of Munitions
- Frank Edward Smith Superintendent, Electrical Dept., National Physical Laboratory
- George Henry Cheverton Smith, Sec. and Cashier, H.M. Dockyard, Pembroke Dock
- Herbert Smith JP President of the Yorkshire Miners Association and Vice-President of the Miners Federation of Great Britain
- John Arthur Smith, Accountant-General's Dept., Admiralty
- Capt. Rowland Siddons Smith, Translator to His Britannic Majesty's Embassy, Petrograd
- Thomas Blampey Smith, Manager, Coventry Ordnance Works, Ltd., Coventry
- William Sydney Smith Inspector of Factories (Dangerous Trades)
- Florence Mary Snowden, Organising Sec., Voluntary Helpers, Munition Workers Canteen Committee, Y.W.C.A.
- F. N. Southam, Director, 60-pounder and 4.5 H.E. Shell Production, Imperial Munitions Board, Canada
- Charles Joseph Southgate Accountant-General's Dept., Admiralty
- Mary Gertrude Catherine Hitchcock Spencer, Central Women's Employment Bureau for the Relief of the Professional Classes
- Rose Elizabeth Squire or Rose Squire, Deputy Principal Lady Inspector of Factories
- Alfred Edward Staniland JP Chairman of the Spilsby Local Emergency Committee, Lincolnshire
- Frank Robert Stapley, Section Director, Contracts Branch, Air Board
- Charles Stein Commandant and Medical Ofc., Park House Auxiliary Hospital, Shipston-on-Stour, Warwickshire
- Maj. Charles Hubert Stemp, Operating Superintendent, North British Railway
- George Routledge Stenson, Superintending Inspector of Taxes
- Richard Henry Stephenson, Manager, Messrs. Smith's Dock Company, Ltd., North and South Shields
- Frederick Stevens, Town Clerk of Bradford; Clerk to the Bradford Local Tribunal
- Ida Kathleen Stevens, Area Controller, Woman's Army Auxiliary Corps
- Patrick William Joseph Stevens, His Majesty's Consul, Batoum
- May Margaret Stevenson, Unit Administrator, Woman's Army Auxiliary Corps
- William March Stevenson, Financial Expert Adviser to the Finance Section, Ministry of Blockade
- Alice Margaret Stewart, President Depute, Lanarkshire, Scottish Branch, British Red Cross Society
- Athole Stewart, Telegram Dept., Foreign Office
- James Stewart, Works Manager, The Caton Engineering Company's Torpedo Factory
- William Allison Stewart, Commercial Services Branch, Ministry of Shipping
- Rufus Stirk, Director, Messrs. John Stirk & Sons, Ltd., Halifax
- Cmdr. Thomas Willing Stirling, Royal Navy, Operations Division, Admiralty
- Frederick William Stobart, George William Stonestreet, Inspector of Stamping, Inland Revenue
- Maj. Harry Vane Stow VD Sec. of the Newspapers for the Fleet Committee, London Chamber of Commerce
- Henrietta Mary Amy Strachey, Vice-President of Division and Commandant of Newlands Corner Auxiliary Hospital, Merrow Downs, Guildford, Surrey
- Evelyn Olive Streatfeild, Commandant, Hammerton House Auxiliary Hospital, Sunderland
- Mary Corisande Streatfeild, Donor and Administrator, Ofc.s Hospital, 24, Park Street, Mayfair, London
- Emily Mary Charlotte Strutt, Commandant, Auxiliary Hospital, Belper, Derbyshire
- George Stubbs FIC Superintending Analyst, Government Laboratory
- George Edward Suter MVO Manager, Constructive Dept., H.M. Dockyard, Rosyth
- Percival Francis Swain, Principal Clerk, Public Trustee Office
- William Henry Swain, Senior Clerk, Military Dept., India Office
- George Percy Tallboy, Private Sec. to the Permanent Sec., Ministry of Food
- Arthur Enfield Taylor, Head of Establishment Branch, Explosives Supply Dept., Ministry of Munitions
- Capt. David Taylor, Master, Donaldson Line
- George Stevenson Taylor, Deputy Inspector under the Aliens Act
- John Taylor, Manager, Messrs. Mather and Platt, Ltd., Manchester
- Richard Henry Taylor, Of the Firm, of Messrs. Topham, Jones and Railton, Ltd.
- Capt. Thomas McComb Taylor, Royal Naval Reserve, Master, Pacific Steam Navigation Company
- Capt. Louis George Tebbs, District Stores Superintendent, London, Ministry of Munitions
- Alfred Edward Tedder, Superintending Aliens Ofc.
- Ivy Gladys Tennyson, Head of Women's Establishment Branch, Ministry of Munitions
- David John Thomas, Manager and Sec., Llanelly Munitions Board of Management
- Edgar William Thomas, Financial Adviser to the Public Trustee
- Capt. John Thomas
- Lillie Thomas, Donor and Commandant, Auxiliary Hospital, Dinas Powis, Glamorgan
- Walter John Thomas, Managing Director, Messrs. George Driver and Son, London
- Mary Thompson, Commandant, Auxiliary Hospital, Burton-on-Trent, Staffordshire
- Robert John Thompson, Head of Fertilisers Section, Food Production Dept.
- Margaret Edith Thomson, Commandant, Divisional Auxiliary Hospital, Ampthill Road Schools, Bedford
- William Thomas Thomson, Manager, Royal Naval Cordite Factory, Holton Heath
- Daisy Thornely, Commandant, Auxiliary Hospital, Devizes
- William Thornton, Clerk, Munitions Tribunal, Leeds
- Duncan Todd, Sec., Reserved Occupations Committee
- Joseph Henry Towsey, His Britannic Majesty's Consul, Milan
- Herbert Arthur Previte Trendell MVO Chief Clerk of the Central Chancery of Orders of Knighthood
- George Harry Male Trew, Acting Superintending Civil Engineer, H.M. Dockyard, Invergordon
- The Hon. Stella Tufton, Lady Superintendent, Alexandra Y.M.C.A. Hostel for Ofc.s
- Capt. William Thomas Turner, Cunard Steamship Co., Ltd.
- Armigill Thomas Turpin, Assistant Comptroller of Accounts and Stores, Prisor Commission
- George Frederick Tweedy, Engineering Director, Messrs. Swan, Hunter and Wighain Richardson, Ltd.
- Walter Clifford Tyndale
- Hugh Harman Underbill, Assistant Superintendent of Charts, Hydrographic Dept., Admiralty
- Harry Archbutt Venables ISO Principal Clerk, Ministry of Pensions
- James William Verdier, Superintendent of Staff, Census of Production, Board of Trade
- Percy Venables Vernon, Section Director, Machine Tool Dept., Ministry of Munitions
- David Arthur Fitzgerald Vesey, Legal Draftsman, Contracts Dept., Ministry of Munitions
- Harry Walker, Messrs. Clark, Chapman & Company, Ltd., Gateshead-on-Tyne
- Falconer Lewis Wallace, Commission Internationale de Ravitaillement, Board of Trade
- William Reeve Wallace, Chief Clerk, Judicial Dept., Privy Council Office
- Cecil Walton JP Manager, Cardonald National Projectile Factory, Ministry of Munitions
- Thomas Warburton, Director of the Bleachers Association, Ltd.
- Leonard Ward, Late Superintending Engineer, Ministry of Munitions, No. 4 Area (Midlands)
- Henry Brooks Warner, Prisoners of War Dept., Foreign Office
- Robert A. S. Waters, Manager, Messrs. Sir W. G. Armstrong, Whitworth & Company, Ltd., York
- Arthur William Watson, Deputy Assistant Sec., Establishment Branch, Whitehall Gardens, Ministry of Munitions
- Henry Watson, Messrs. H. Watson & Sons, Newcastle upon Tyne
- Isaac Adolphus Herbert Watson, Superintendent of Stores & Transit, H.M. Stationery Office
- William Elder Watson JP Member of Appeal Tribunal, Elgin
- Edgar Charles Watts, Naval Store Ofc., H.M. Dockyard, Chatham
- Henry Weatherill, Principal Clerk and Actuary to the National Debt Comm.s
- Frederick William Herron Weaver, Ministry of Shipping
- Cecil Dunstan Webb, Procurator-General's Dept.
- Amherst Webber, Director, Passport Control Office, Paris
- William Goold Weir, Partner of Messrs. David Rowan & Company, Glasgow
- Thomas George Raymond Wells, War Office Meat Expert
- Basil Eliot Wenham, Section Director, Raw Materials Dept., Ministry of Munitions
- Edmund Arthur Robert Werner, Inspector of Factories
- Capt. John Andrew Chilton Wetherall, Sec., Northampton Territorial Force Association
- Charles Joseph Wharton, Deputy Director of Inspection, Munitions Areas, Sheffield
- Lt.-Col. William Henry Anthony Wharton VD
- Arthur Rabbitts White JP Chairman, Wiltshire War Agricultural Executive Committee
- Frederick White, Sec. of the Australasian Refrigerated Tonnage Committee
- Frederick Wickham, Controller, Money Order Dept., General Post Office
- Cmdr. Edmund Wildy VD RNVR Drafting Cmdr., Royal Navy, Dept., Crystal Palace
- Lt. Norman Wilkinson RNVR RI
- Frank Eliot Williams, Chairman of one of the Licensing Committees of the War Trade Dept.
- Maj. Ronald Frederick Williams, Assistant Director, Shipyard Labour Dept., Admiralty
- Arthur Maitland Wilson DL JP Chairman of the Organising Emergency Committee, West Suffolk
- Geraldine Wilson, Commandant, Auxiliary Hospital, Stanwick Park, North Yorkshire
- George Gordon Wilson, His Britannic Majesty's Consul, Callao
- George Heron Wilson, Assistant Controller, Priority Dept., Ministry of Munitions
- Harry James Wilson, Superintending Inspector of Factories
- Hubert Wilberforce Wilson, His Britannic Majesty's Consul, Guayaquil
- Thomas Wilson JP Member of Lanarkshire Appeal Tribunal
- Lt.-Cmdr. Harry Egerton Wimperis RNVR
- William Humphris Winny, A Knight of Grace and Deputy Comm. of the Order of St. John of Jerusalem
- James Wood, Chief Inspector, Board of Agriculture for Scotland
- James Wood, Director of Shrapnel Production, Imperial Munitions Board, Canada
- Joseph Woods Senior Dental Surgeon, Mirren, Switzerland
- William James Uglow Woolcock, Sec., Pharmaceutical Society; Assistant Director of Army Contracts
- Frank Vigers Worthington, Deputy Chief Censor, War Office
- Anthony Andrew Augustine Wotzel, Chief Staff Ofc., Labour Statistics Dept., Ministry of Labour
- Charles Francis Wright, Superintending Inspector of Factories
- Hugh Copner Wynne-Edwards, Section Director, Contracts Dept., Ministry of Munitions
- Aline Wythes, Vice-President, Epping Division, British Red Cress and Order of St. John of Jerusalem; Commandant of Theydon Towers Auxiliary Hospital, Epping, Essex
- Sophia Bruce Yeoman, Commandant, Auxiliary Hospital, Sleights, North Yorkshire
- Frederick William Young, Naval Salvage Adviser
- James Young, Senior Instructor in Science, Royal Military Academy
- Robert Hellyer Young, Ministry of Shipping
- Sidney Young, Managing Director of the British Argentine Meat Company

For services in connection with the War in France, Egypt and Salonika —

- William Austin, Young Men's Christian Association Sec. for the 1st and 3rd Armies
- Alice Chisholm, Organiser and Superintendent of the Soldiers' Club and Rest Camp, Kantara Railway Station, Egypt
- Isabel Currie, Founder and Manager of the British Soldiers' Club, Havre
- Richard Hare Duke, Deputy Chief Engineer, Egyptian State Railways
- George Herbert Griffith, Traffic Superintendent, Egyptian State Railways
- William Jessop, Manager, Young Men's Christian Association, Egypt
- Charles John Magrath Superintendent, Young Men's Christian Association, France
- Sydney H. Wells, Director-General of Technical Education, Egypt

British India

- Constance Fraser, President, Hyderabad Ladies War Relief Association
- Lt.-Col. Arthur Leslie Jacob CIE Indian Army, Political Dept., Political Agent, Zhob, Baluchistan
- Maj. Arthur Dennys Gilbert Ramsay CIE Indian Army, Political Dept., Political Agent, Loralai, Baluchistan
- Lt.-Col. Henry Batten Huddleston, Agent, Burma Railways, Honorary Aide-de-Camp to the Lieutenant-Governor of Burma, Vice-Chairman, Rangoon Port Trust
- David Petrie CIE Indian Police
- Godfrey Charles Denham CIE Indian Police
- Cowasji Jehangir, Merchant, Bombay
- Sarat Kumar Mullick Honorary Sec., Bengalee Reg. Committee, Private Medical Practitioner, Calcutta
- Thomas Steel Downie, Sec., Karachi Port Trust
- Arthur Alexander Carnegie, Cmdr. of the Cable Steamer Patrick Stewart
- Edward John Buck, Honorary Sec. of "Our Day" in India

Commonwealth of Australia

- Elizabeth Anderson, for services in Australia in connection with the Australian Branch of the British Red Cross Society
- Percy Arnold, for services in connection with the Australian Branch of the British Red Cross Society in England
- Doctor Edith Helen Barrett, Honorary Sec., Australian Branch of the British Red Cross Society
- Charles Austin Bunworth Campion, for services in connection with the Australian Branch of the British Red Cross Society in England
- Mary Elizabeth Maud Chomley, for services in connection with the Australian Branch of the British' Red Cross Society in England
- Adelaide, Lady Creswell, for services in Australia in connection with the Australian Branch of the British Red Cross Society
- Vera Deakin, for services in connection with the Australian Branch of the British Red Cross Society in England
- James Oswald Fairfax, Chairman of the New South Wales Division, Australian Branch, British Red Cross Society
- Jeannie Gilruth, for services in Australia in connection with the Australian Branch of the British Red Cross Society
- Lt.-Col. Edwyn Walton Hayward, Comm., Australian Red Cross Society
- Gwyneforde, Lady James, for services in Australia in connection with the Australian Branch of the British Red Cross Society
- A. E. Miller, for services in Australia in connection with the Australian Branch of the British Red Cross Society
- Mary Elizabeth, Lady Miller, for services in Australia in connection with the Australian Branch of the British Red Cross Society
- Gladys Owen, for services in Australia in connection with the Australian Branch of the British Red Cross Society
- F. Mary Parker, Honorary Sec., Southern Tasmanian Division, Australian Red Cross
- Philadelphia Nina Robertson, Sec., Australian Branch of the British Red Cross Society
- Kathleen Kyffin Thomas, for services in Australia in connection with the Australian Branch of the British Red Cross Society
- Herbert Carey Tucker, Initiator of the Button Scheme
- Reginald Edward Weigall Organiser of motor service for the reception of returned and wounded soldiers

Egypt and the Sudan

- Arthur Thomas Lloyd, War Trade Dept.
- James Francis Gordon Hopkins, Chief Inspector, Ministry of Finance
- Arthur Ferguson MacCallan FRCS Director of Ophthalmic Hospitals
- Albert William Hazel, Inspector of Interior
- Edward Harry Grogan, Chief Inspector of Marine, Ports and Lights Administration
- Lindsay Edward Bury, Inspector of Irrigation
- Frank Pears Watson, Inspector of State Buildings, Dept. of Public Works
- Harold Preece Hewins, Sec. of Sudan Economic Board
- George Ehret Iles, Governor of Blue Nile Province
- Clement Gaukroger Hodgson, Chief Mechanical Engineer, Sudan Railways
- William Crothers Hornblower, Organiser of the Refugee Camps at Alexandria and Port Said
- Norman Macnaghten, Inspector, Ministry of Interior

Dominion of New Zealand

- Fanny Boyle
- Heni Materoa, Lady Carroll
- James John Clark, Mayor of the City of Dunedin
- Lavinia Coates
- David Whamond Duthie
- James Henry Gunson, Mayor of the City of Auckland
- Jessie Gunson
- Henry Holland, Mayor of the City of Christchurch
- Jane Holland
- Helen Lowry
- Miria Woodbine Pomare
- Arthur Edgar Gravenor Rhodes
- Eva Lydia Rutherford
- Mary Downie Stewart
- Agnes Vernon Wigram
- Hilda Williams, for services in connection with the Hospitality Committee of the New Zealand War Contingent Association

Union of South Africa

- Theodora Mildred Amphlett, Honorary Sec., South African Comforts Committee in London
- Norman Anstey, late Mayor of Johannesburg
- Reginald Andrew Blankenberg, Assistant Sec. to the High Comm. in London for the Union of South Africa
- The Hon. Albert Browne CMG ISO Joint Honorary Sec., Governor-General's Fund
- The Hon. Phyllis Sydney Buxton, for Hospital and Convalescent work
- Penelope Louise Chappe, of the Red Cross Committee, Durban
- Gowan Cresswell Strange Clark CMG Assistant General Manager, South African Railways
- Mary Elizabeth Davis, of the Women's Patriotic.League, Pietermaritzburg
- Walter Greenacre, of the Governor-General's Fund and other Committees, Durban
- Helen Lena, Lady Juta
- Elizabeth Tryphena Lewis, of the Comforts Committee, Cape Town
- Ellen Maria Louisa Mackeurtan, of the Women's Patriotic League, Durban
- Susannah Brandt Marx, of the Comforts Committee, Johannesburg
- Joseph Henry Nicolson, Mayor of Durban
- John Wesley O'Hara, late Mayor of Johannesburg
- John Parker, late Mayor of Cape Town
- Henry William Sampson, Member of the Executive Committee, Governor-General's Fund
- Sybil Annie, Lady Smartt, of the Red Cross and other War Fund Committees
- Maud Elizabeth, Lady Solomon
- Col. The Hon. Walter Ernest Mortimer Stanford CB CMG Chairman, Recruiting Committee, Cape Town
- Maj. Edward Albert Sturman, Honorary Sec., South African Gifts and Comforts Committee
- John Taylor, Chairman, Johannesburg Local Committee of the Governor-General's Fund
- Carel Johannes van Zijl, for services in connection with recruiting

Newfoundland

- Adeline Elizabeth Browning, for services in connection with the reception and treatment of returned sailors and soldiers
- Charles O'Neill Conroy KC Commandant of the Catholic Cadet Corps
- Katharine Emerson, Treasurer of the Women's Patriotic Association
- Walter Baine Grieve, Honorary Sec. of the Recruiting Committee
- Eleonora Thompson MacPherson, Member of the Executive of the Women's Patriotic Association
- Florence Lavinia Paterson, Member of the Committee for receiving returned soldiers
- Robert George Rendell, Organiser of the Cadet Corps

Crown Colonies, Protectorates, etc.

- Chaloner Grenville Alabaster, for services in connection with the Cable Censorate, Hong Kong
- John Humber Allwood, for services to the Government of Jamaica and to War charities
- Capt. James Leo Berne, District Comm., Somaliland Protectorate, for services in connection with the supply of camels for the Egyptian Expeditionary Force
- Amy Isabel, Lady Bullock, for services in aid of War charities in the Bermuda Islands
- Albert Ruskin Cook Medical Ofc., Church Missionary Society Hospital, Kampala, Uganda
- Lt.-Col. James Cran, Commanding the British Honduras Territorial Force
- Anthony de Freitas, Chief Justice and Acting Administrator of the Island of St. Vincent
- Gertrude Drayton, Sec., King George and Queen Mary Victoria League Clubs for men of the Oversea Forces
- Ada Maud, Lady Egerton; for services to War and other charities in British Guiana
- Muriel Harriet Felton; for services rendered to the British Squadron on the occasion of the Naval Battle of the Falkland Islands, 8 December 1914
- John Campbell Fisher, Auditor, and Head of the Food Control Office, Malta
- Stanley Hewitt Fletcher, late-Consul at Chinde, and Agent there of the Nyasaland Government
- John Talfourd Furley, Sec. for Native Affairs, Gold Coast Colony
- The Hon. Evelyn Graham Murray, Lady Superintendent of Peel House, King George and Queen Mary's Club for the Oversea Forces
- George Frederick Huggins, for services in connection with recruiting and in securing employment for discharged soldiers, Trinidad
- Edward St. John Jackson, Legal Adviser, Colony of the Gambia
- Williard Frank James, Mayor of Blantyre, and Chairman of the Central War Funds Committee, Nyasaland Protectorate
- Robert Russell Horsley Jebb, Assistant District Comm., Somaliland Protectorate; for services in connection with the supply of camels for the Egyptian Expeditionary Force
- Margaret Emmeline Johnston, President of the Working League, Gibraltar
- Lim Boon Keng, Unofficial Member of the Legislative Council of the Straits Settlements
- Harcourt Malcolm KC Speaker of the House of Assembly of the Bahamas Islands, and Chairman of the Bahamas' War Relief Committee
- James Gordon McDonald, Chairman of the Rhodesia Munitions Committee
- Sybil Helen Nicholson, for services on behalf of sailors and soldiers in the Straits Settlements
- Edward Hugh Dyneley Nicolls, Director of Public Works, Cyprus
- Joseph Armand Patron CMG for services to the Government of Gibraltar
- Emily, Lady Probyn, for services to War Charities in Barbados
- Cecily Radcliffe, for services to War Charities and to sick and wounded sailors and soldiers, Malta
- Beatrice Letitia May Radford, Sec. and Organiser of the East African Women's Field Force Fund
- Joseph Rippon, Manager of the Direct West India Cable Company, and Chairman of the Bermuda Contingents Committee
- Corinna, Marchesa Scicluna; for services in providing and equipping a Military Hospital in Malta
- Ernest Hamilton Sharp, Chairman of the Military Commission, Hong Kong
- Hubert Ashton Laselve Simpson, elected Member of the Legislative Council, and lately Mayor of Kingston
- Jamaica
- Stanley Salisbury Spurling, Member of the Executive Council and of the House of Assembly of the Bermudas
- Newton John Stabb, Chief Manager, Hong Kong and Shanghai Banking Corporation, Hong Kong
- Maj. Charles Augustus Swinbourne, Commandant of the Fiji Defence Force
- William Wilson, of Kingston, Jamaica; for services in recruiting and on behalf of sick and wounded soldiers

Honorary Ofc. of the said Most Excellent Order

- The Right Reverend Philippe Perlo, for assistance in providing priests and nuns for the work in the Carrier Corps Hospitals, in connection with the East Africa Expeditionary Force.
