= Richard Coles (civil servant) =

British civil servant (1862–1935)

Sir Richard Coles CBE
- Born: Richard James Coles; 17 November 1862; Bedfont, England
- Died: 22 October 1935 (aged 72); Kingston-upon-Thames, England
- Occupation: Civil servant
- Spouse: Dorothy Jane Dredge (m. 1906)
- Children: 4

Sir Richard James Coles CBE (17 November 1862 – 22 October 1935) was a British civil servant. Joining the War Office in 1880, he was appointed Superintendent of the Army Pension Issue Office in 1915. He then moved to the newly created Ministry of Pensions, where he was named Assistant Director-General of Finance in 1917 and Financial Assistant Secretary in 1920.

Coles was named an Officer and Commander of the Order of the British Empire in 1918 and 1919, respectively. His appointment as a Knight Bachelor was announced in the 1925 New Year Honours, and he was knighted by George V on 12 February of that year at Buckingham Palace.

== Early life and family ==
=== Childhood and education ===
Coles was born in Bedfont, Middlesex on 17 November 1862 to Mr. and Mrs. John Thomas Coles. He attended private schools.

=== Marriage and children ===
Coles married the former Dorothy Jane Dredge on 12 September 1906. The couple went on to have four sons.

== Career ==
Coles entered the Civil Service in 1878 as a boy clerk with the General Post Office. In 1880, began his service with the War Office, where he would remain for more than three decades. By 1915, he was Superintendent of the Army Pension Issue Office, and, the following year, he helped organise the Ministry of Pensions, where he was named Assistant Director-General of Finance. From 1918 to 1920, he was acting Director-General of Finance, and, in 1920, he was made permanent Financial Assistant Secretary.

Coles was named an Officer of the Order of the British Empire in 1918 and a Commander of the Order in 1919.

== Later life and death ==
Coles retired from the Ministry of Pensions in 1925. His appointment as a Knight Bachelor was announced in that year's New Year Honours, and, on 12 February, he was knighted by George V at Buckingham Palace. He died at his home in Kingston-upon-Thames on 22 October 1935 and was buried at Surbiton Cemetery.
