= Edward G. Fairholme =

British author and editor (1873–1956)

- Born: Edward George Robert Fairholme; 7 November 1873; London
- Died: 6 January 1956 (aged 82); Frinton-on-Sea
- Occupation: Animal welfare campaigner
- Spouse: Eleanor Chew (m. 1903)

Edward George Robert Fairholme (7 November 1873 – 6 January 1956) was an English animal welfare campaigner and writer. He was chief secretary of the RSPCA from 1908 to 1933.

== Biography ==
Fairholme was born in London. He was the son of Captain Charles Fairholme and Julie Pollnitz. He was educated privately at Chatham House School in Ramsgate. He worked at William Heinemann publishers from 1896 and joined Lawrence & Bullen Ltd in 1901. He was Deputy Assistant Director Veterinary Service 1915–1916. In 1899, he was secretary of the third International Publishers' Congress in London. He wrote articles for The Academy, The Nineteenth Century, The Outlook and The Sketch. Fairholme lived at Campden Hill Court in London. He married Eleanor Chew in 1903.

Fairholme was a captain in the Royal Army Veterinary Corps in WWI. He was awarded the 1918 New Year Honours (OBE). His brother Lieutenant-Colonel Henry William Fairholme committed suicide in 1933. He died on 6 January 1956 at Frinton-on-Sea.

== Animal welfare ==
Fairholme was chief secretary of the RSPCA from 1908 to 1933, succeeding Gerard Lysley Derriman. He was editor of the RSPCA's magazine The Animal World. He was an advocate of humane slaughter, suggesting that stun guns should be used on cattle and poultry.

Fairholme was a speaker at the First American International Humane Conference in Washington in 1910 and attended the Second International Humane Conference in 1923. He was also a speaker at meetings of the Society for Promotion of Kindness to Animals.

In 1924, he co-authored a history of the RSPCA. The Prince of Wales wrote a foreword for the book. A second edition was published in 1934.

== Selected publications ==
- The R.S.P.C.A. and the Decrepit Horse Traffic to the Continent (1910)
- The Royal Society for the Prevention of Cruelty to Animals: Why it Was Needed and What it Has Done (1914)
- A Century of Work for Animals: The History of the R.S.P.C.A., 1824-1924 (with Wellesley Pain, 1924)
