= Mīria Pōmare =

New Zealand community leader (1877–1971)

Mīria, Lady Pōmare OBE
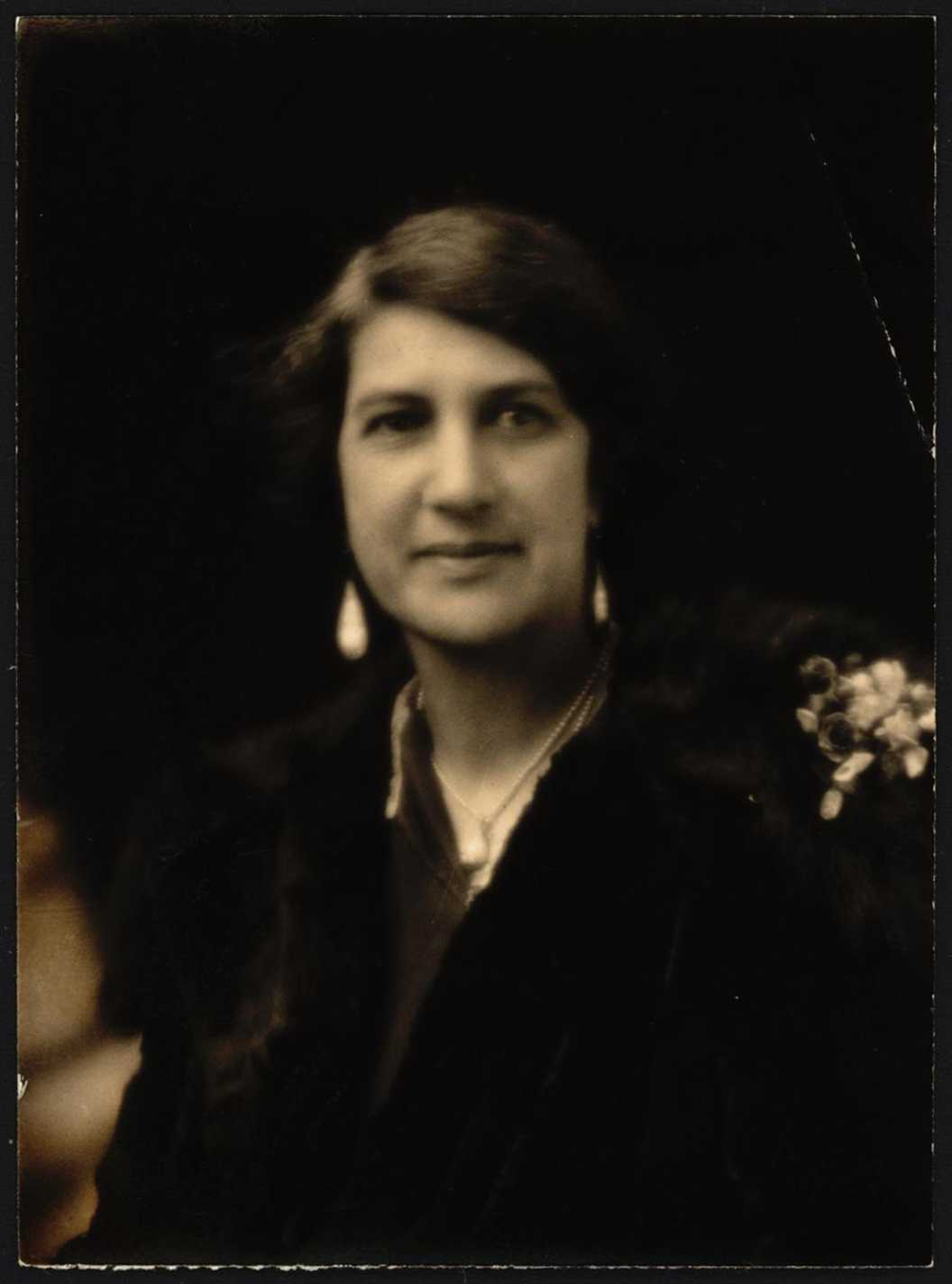
- Pōmare in 1928
- Born: 24 December 1877; Ahipakura, New Zealand
- Died: 7 September 1971 (aged 93); Lower Hutt, New Zealand
- Burial place: Manukorihi Pā, Waitara
- Spouse: Māui Pōmare (died 1930)
- Children: 3
- Father: James Woodbine Johnson

Mildred Amelia Woodbine "Mīria" Pomare, Lady Pōmare (née Johnson, 24 December 1877 – 7 September 1971), also known as Mīria Tāpapa, was a New Zealand community leader. Of Māori descent, she identified with the Rongowhakaata and Te Aitanga-a-Māhaki iwi. She was born in Ahipakura in Poverty Bay, New Zealand in 1877.

Pōmare was appointed an Officer of the Order of the British Empire in the 1918 New Year Honours. In 1953, she was awarded the Queen Elizabeth II Coronation Medal.

Pōmare died on 7 September 1971.
