= Mary Chomley =

Australian charity worker, arts patron and feminist (1871–1960)

Mary Chomley OBE
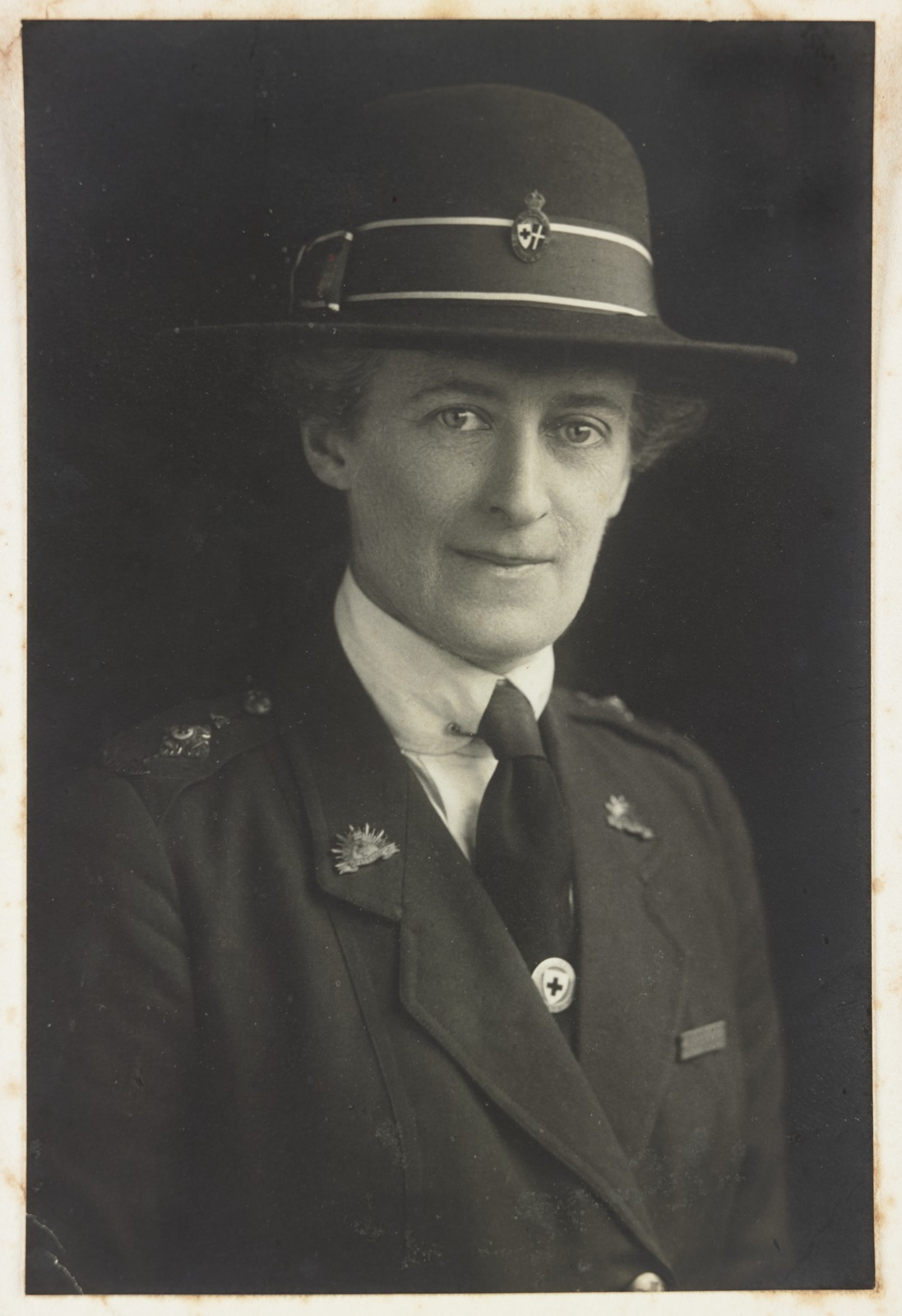
- Mary Chomley, 1918
- Born: Mary Elizabeth Maude Chomley; 29 July 1871; Malvern, Victoria
- Died: 21 July 1960 (aged 88); St. Kilda, Victoria
- Organization: Australian Red Cross

Mary Elizabeth Maude Chomley OBE (29 July 1871 – 21 July 1960) was a charity worker, arts patron and feminist. She was secretary of the Prisoners of War branch of the Australian Red Cross based in London during World War I. She coordinated a team of volunteers who facilitated communication with Australian prisoners of war, and their families back home. The prisoners referred to her as an 'angel' and considered her a lifeline providing them with the essential material aid, and communication required to survive.

== Early life ==
Chomley was born in Riddell's Creek to Juliana Charlotte Chomley née Hogg, and Arthur Wolfe Chomley a barrister and judge of the County Court and the Supreme Court of Victoria, who was the younger half brother of Francis Chomley. She had eight siblings, two of whom died in infancy. The family lived at the property Dromkeen homestead which her father named after his mother's home in Ireland.

She was the first cousin of Charles Henry Chomley.

== Career ==
In 1907, Chomley was the Secretary of the Australian Exhibition of Women's Work. She was the founder of the Victorian Arts and Crafts Society. From 1909 until 1914, she was the foundation state secretary of the Victoria League for Commonwealth Friendship, and she remained a member of the organisation until her death.

Chomley travelled to London in June 1914, and was prevented from returning due to the outbreak of war. So she began working for the war effort, by teaching refugees English and she volunteered at the Robert Lindsay Memorial Hospital for Officers. She worked at the Princess Christian's Hospital for Officers in London from 1915 until 1916.

Chomley was good friends with Lady Helen Munro Ferguson, who was the president of the Australian Red Cross Society, and in 1916 Ferguson promoted Chomley to secretary of the newly established Prisoners of War branch of the Australian Red Cross. In this role she coordinated a team of volunteers based in the British War Office, working in collaboration with the International Red Cross, the Central Prisoners of War Committee, the Bureau de Secours aux Prisonniers de Guerre, and other international organisations at Geneva, The Hague, and elsewhere. The organisation compiled lists of the Australian prisoners from lists of prisoner provided using information gathered from the German Red Cross and the Turkish Red Crescent Society, and from correspondence from prisoners of war.

The department was an intermediary of communication between the prisoners and their family and friends facilitating the exchange of letters and parcels between them. The department also issued parcels to the prisoners with food and clothing, and attempted to provide for special request when possible, and when packages of 'forbidden article' restrictions and censorship were in place, the Australian Red Cross was the only organisation who were able to distribute such items across the borders. According to the correspondence sent to Chomley, many prisoners of war stated these parcels were responsible for their survival. The Australian Army Medical Services reported that the Prisoners of War Department provided 395,695 parcels of food, and 36,339 and parcels of clothing.

The prisoners were restricted to sending one postcard each week and two letters each month to the Red Cross office. So, Mary was described by the prisoners as an 'angel' as she was the link they had back to their friends and family at home. Chomley's team kept detailed records of the prisoners, including where they were located and their individual needs, such as their shoe and clothing sizes. Chomley received letters from many prisoners asking for information about their families, or thanking her for her kindness and assistance. She also formed correspondence with prisoners who took leadership roles in the camps overseeing the distributing parcels and information such as Douglas Grant. Chomley kept these letters, and created photo albums of the postcards and photographs she was sent. These records are kept in the Australian War Memorial.

On15 March 1918, Chomley was appointed an Officer of the Order of the British Empire as part of the 1918 New Year Honours.

After World War I, Chomley was appointed by the British Government to be a member of a delegation which reported on the opportunities and working conditions for women migrants to Australia in 1919, and she was the Australian representative on the Society for the Overseas Settlement of British Women.

Chomley was president of the British Legion's women's section in Virginia Water, Surrey, England from 1925 until 1933. She returned to Melbourne in 1934, and continued to work for the Victoria League for Commonwealth Friendship and the Arts and Crafts Society of Victoria.

The National Portrait Gallery of Australia, contains a portrait of Chomley, painted by Violet Teague in 1909.

== Death ==
Chomley died at her home in Toorak on 21 July 1960.
