= Patricia Downes Chomley =

Australian nurse and college director (1910–2002)

Patricia Downes Chomley MBE
- Born: 1910
- Died: 24 October 2002 (aged 91–92)
- Organization: College of Nursing

Patricia Downes Chomley MBE was the first director of postgraduate nursing education at the College of Nursing, Australia from 1949 until 1964. She also served in the Australian Army Nursing Service in 1940, and saw active duty in Palestine, Libya, Ceylon and on the hospital ship Manunda. She was appointed as a member of the Order of the British Empire in 1968 for her service to nursing administration.

== Early life ==
Chomley was born in 1910 at Sale, Victoria, the daughter of Francis Charles Chomley and Mary Aileen Charlotte (nee Anderson). Francis (Frank) Charles Chomley was a surveyor employed by the Victorian Government. They were the owners of a property known as Glenelva, Helena Avenue, Kallista, from about 1921. Chomley's grandfather was William Downes Chomley who was appointed as '...territorial magistrate in the colony of Victoria in 1859.' Violet Ida Chomley, a sister to Frank and aunt to Chomley, studied at the University of Melbourne and gained a Master's degree in 1893. After teaching in secondary schools in Australia and England Violet was elected to the Bedford Town Council in 1936.

Chomley attended Lauriston Girls School in Armadale, Victoria. She trained in nursing at The Alfred Hospital, Melbourne in 1934 and obtained a midwifery certificate from the Royal Women's Hospital a year later.

== Career ==
Chomley worked as a Tutor Sister at the Alfred Hospital until she joined the Australian Army Nursing Service (AANS) in 1940. She saw active duty in Palestine, Libya, Ceylon and on the hospital ship Manunda.

After the war ended Chomley became a Tutor Sister at the Royal College of Nursing, London and in 1948 was appointed Assistant to the Director of the Colleges. Awarded the Red Cross Florence Nightingale International Foundation Scholarship she completed a Tutor Sister course at the College graduating with distinctions. Chomley returned to Australia in 1948 having toured hospitals in Scandinavia and Belgium.

Chomley became the first director of postgraduate nursing education at the College of Nursing, Australia, CNA, (later Royal College of Nursing, Australia, RCNA) in December 1949 and would remain in that position until 1964. The CNA was located in Melbourne and its establishment in Victoria was marred by a division with the New South Wales College of Nursing which refused to acknowledge the CNA in Melbourne as anything other than a Victorian organisation. This division was to last until 1992 when the two colleges signed a working agreement to recognise each other's membership. There had been considerable cooperation between the two colleges over the decades in relation to the courses they offered to nurses.

During the 15 years of Miss Chomley’s leadership of the Royal College of Nursing, Australia, some six hundred students undertook courses. Many of those nurses subsequently held senior nursing positions throughout Australia and were instrumental in important developments in the nursing profession and quality of patient care. Chomley introduced and guided many changes to the administration and educational activities. She was well-known as an adept and experienced 'politician', as a leading nurse educator, a woman who commanded respect and one who was well able to deal with difficult individuals or situations. When Chomley retired in 1964 it was noted that it would be no easy task to replace her.

Chomley was appointed a Member of the Order of the British Empire in 1968 for "service to nursing administration." In her retirement, she was Deputy Club Consultant for the Old Peoples’ Welfare Council of Victoria, advising elderly citizens clubs throughout the state.

== Death ==
Chomley died at the Baxter Village Nursing Home in Frankston, on October 24, 2002, aged 92.
