= List of heritage sites in Gqeberha =

This is a list of the heritage sites in Gqeberha as recognised by the South African Heritage Resources Agency.

SAHRA identifier	Site name	Description	Town	District	NHRA status	Coordinates	Image
9/2/073/0003	49 Havelock Street, Port Elizabeth	One of the few wood and iron houses remaining. House has an interesting bullnose verandah roof with detailed wooden balustrading. Pleasant front garden with large trees behind picket fence. Architectural style: Victorian cottage. Type of site: House Previous use: Residential. Current use: Commercial.	Port Elizabeth	Port Elizabeth	Provincial Heritage Site	33°57′46″S 25°36′50″E	One of the few wood and iron houses remaining. House has an interesting bullnose verandah roof with detailed wooden balustrading. Pleasant front garden with large trees behind picket fence. Architectural style: Victorian cottage. Type of site: House Previous use: Residential. Current use: Commercial.
9/2/073/0004	Sharley Cribb Nursing College, 58 Park Drive, Port Elizabeth		Port Elizabeth	Port Elizabeth	Provincial Heritage Site	33°57′54″S 25°36′09″E	Media related to Sharley Cribb Nursing College at Wikimedia Commons
9/2/073/0005	Donkin Reserve, Port Elizabeth	Port Elizabeth owes its origin and development in a large measure to the arrival of the British Settlers in 1820. At the time of their arrival Governor Lord Charles Somerset was on leave in England and Sir Rufane Donkin acted for him from 13 January, 18 .	Port Elizabeth, Central	Port Elizabeth	Provincial Heritage Site	33°57′44″S 25°37′14″E	Port Elizabeth owes its origin and development in a large measure to the arrival of the British Settlers in 1820. At the time of their arrival Governor Lord Charles Somerset was on leave in England and Sir Rufane Donkin acted for him from 13 January, 18 . Media related to Donkin Reserve at Wikimedia Commons
9/2/073/0006	Fort Frederick, Belmont Terrace, Port Elizabeth	Built overlooking the original lagoon at the mouth of the Baakens River. At the time it was the only stone structure in the district. Named after Frederick, Duke of York, the fort contains a powder magazine and a guardhouse and originally contained eight During the second half of the eighteenth century the stock-farmers penetrated as far as the Fish River and Algoa Bay fell within the sphere of encounters between the Boers and the Xhosa. In 1799, after the Third Xhosa War had ended in an unsatisfactory ar Architectural style: Military Fort. Type of site: Fort.	Port Elizabeth, Central	Port Elizabeth	Provincial Heritage Site	33°57′59″S 25°37′17″E	Built overlooking the original lagoon at the mouth of the Baakens River. At the time it was the only stone structure in the district. Named after Frederick, Duke of York, the fort contains a powder magazine and a guardhouse and originally contained eight During the second half of the eighteenth century the stock-farmers penetrated as far as the Fish River and Algoa Bay fell within the sphere of encounters between the Boers and the Xhosa. In 1799, after the Third Xhosa War had ended in an unsatisfactory ar Architectural style: Military Fort. Type of site: Fort. Media related to Fort Frederick, Port Elizabeth at Wikimedia Commons
9/2/073/0007	Pioneer's Memorial Synagogue, Raleigh Street, Port Elizabeth	Type of site: Synagogue.	Port Elizabeth	Port Elizabeth	Provincial Heritage Site	33°57′33″S 25°36′48″E	Type of site: Synagogue.
9/2/073/0008/001	44 Newington Road, Port Elizabeth		Port Elizabeth	Port Elizabeth	Provincial Heritage Site	33°57′35″S 25°36′15″E	
9/2/073/0008/002	58 Newington Road, Port Elizabeth	These nine houses form part of a unique terrace consisting of a row of identical late-Victorian double-stoleyed semi-detached houses which were erected at the turn of the twentieth century and have since remained unaltered.	Port Elizabeth	Port Elizabeth	Provincial Heritage Site	33°57′35″S 25°36′13″E	These nine houses form part of a unique terrace consisting of a row of identical late-Victorian double-stoleyed semi-detached houses which were erected at the turn of the twentieth century and have since remained unaltered.
9/2/073/0008/003	38 Newington Road, Port Elizabeth	These nine houses form part of a unique terrace consisting of a row of identical late-Victorian double-stoleyed semi-detached houses which were erected at the turn of the nineteenth century and have since remained unaltered.	Port Elizabeth	Port Elizabeth	Provincial Heritage Site	33°57′35″S 25°36′15″E	These nine houses form part of a unique terrace consisting of a row of identical late-Victorian double-stoleyed semi-detached houses which were erected at the turn of the nineteenth century and have since remained unaltered.
9/2/073/0008/004	40 Newington Road, Port Elizabeth	These nine houses form part of a unique terrace consisting of a row of identical late-Victorian double-stoleyed semi-detached houses which were erected at the turn of the nineteenth century and have since remained unaltered.	Port Elizabeth	Port Elizabeth	Provincial Heritage Site	33°57′35″S 25°36′15″E	These nine houses form part of a unique terrace consisting of a row of identical late-Victorian double-stoleyed semi-detached houses which were erected at the turn of the nineteenth century and have since remained unaltered.
9/2/073/0008/005	42 Newington Road, Port Elizabeth	These nine houses form part of a unique terrace consisting of a row of identical late-Victorian double-stoleyed semi-detached houses which were erected at the turn of the nineteenth century and have since remained unaltered.	Port Elizabeth	Port Elizabeth	Provincial Heritage Site	33°57′35″S 25°36′15″E	These nine houses form part of a unique terrace consisting of a row of identical late-Victorian double-stoleyed semi-detached houses which were erected at the turn of the nineteenth century and have since remained unaltered.
9/2/073/0008/006	46 Newington Road, Port Elizabeth	These nine houses form part of a unique terrace consisting of a row of identical late-Victorian double-stoleyed semi-detached houses which were erected at the turn of the nineteenth century and have since remained unaltered.	Port Elizabeth	Port Elizabeth	Provincial Heritage Site	33°57′35″S 25°36′14″E	These nine houses form part of a unique terrace consisting of a row of identical late-Victorian double-stoleyed semi-detached houses which were erected at the turn of the nineteenth century and have since remained unaltered.
9/2/073/0008/007	48 Newington Road, Port Elizabeth	These nine houses form part of a unique terrace consisting of a row of identical late-Victorian double-stoleyed semi-detached houses which were erected at the turn of the nineteenth century and have since remained unaltered.	Port Elizabeth	Port Elizabeth	Provincial Heritage Site	33°57′35″S 25°36′14″E	These nine houses form part of a unique terrace consisting of a row of identical late-Victorian double-stoleyed semi-detached houses which were erected at the turn of the nineteenth century and have since remained unaltered.
9/2/073/0008/008	50 Newington Road, Port Elizabeth	These nine houses form part of a unique terrace consisting of a row of identical late-Victorian double-stoleyed semi-detached houses which were erected at the turn of the nineteenth century and have since remained unaltered.	Port Elizabeth	Port Elizabeth	Provincial Heritage Site	33°57′34″S 25°36′14″E	These nine houses form part of a unique terrace consisting of a row of identical late-Victorian double-stoleyed semi-detached houses which were erected at the turn of the nineteenth century and have since remained unaltered.
9/2/073/0008/009	52 Newington Road, Port Elizabeth	These nine houses form part of a unique terrace consisting of a row of identical late-Victorian double-stoleyed semi-detached houses which were erected at the turn of the nineteenth century and have since remained unaltered.	Port Elizabeth	Port Elizabeth	Provincial Heritage Site	33°57′34″S 25°36′14″E	These nine houses form part of a unique terrace consisting of a row of identical late-Victorian double-stoleyed semi-detached houses which were erected at the turn of the nineteenth century and have since remained unaltered.
9/2/073/0008/010	54 Newington Road, Port Elizabeth	These nine houses form part of a unique terrace consisting of a row of identical late-Victorian double-stoleyed semi-detached houses which were erected at the turn of the nineteenth century and have since remained unaltered.	Port Elizabeth	Port Elizabeth	Provincial Heritage Site	33°57′35″S 25°36′13″E	These nine houses form part of a unique terrace consisting of a row of identical late-Victorian double-stoleyed semi-detached houses which were erected at the turn of the nineteenth century and have since remained unaltered.
9/2/073/0008/011	56 Newington Road, Port Elizabeth	This house forms part of a unique terrace consisting of a row of identical late Victorian double-storeyed semi-detached houses which were erected at the end of the nineteenth century and which have since remained unaltered.	Port Elizabeth	Port Elizabeth	Provincial Heritage Site	33°57′35″S 25°36′13″E	This house forms part of a unique terrace consisting of a row of identical late Victorian double-storeyed semi-detached houses which were erected at the end of the nineteenth century and which have since remained unaltered.
9/2/073/0009	10 Bird Street, Port Elizabeth	A double storey dwelling with finely detailed timber veranda which is painted in Regency stripes. The building is in scale with the surrounding area and the historic character of the street. Alterations done by Jones and McWilliams in 1956. Architectural style: Victorian townhouse with Regency veranda. Type of site: House.	Port Elizabeth, Central	Port Elizabeth	Provincial Heritage Site	33°57′53″S 25°37′05″E	A double storey dwelling with finely detailed timber veranda which is painted in Regency stripes. The building is in scale with the surrounding area and the historic character of the street. Alterations done by Jones and McWilliams in 1956. Architectural style: Victorian townhouse with Regency veranda. Type of site: House.
9/2/073/0010	Opera House, Whites Road, Port Elizabeth	The Port Elizabeth Opera House is an important example of early South Africa theatre architecture. Rehabilitated by stauch, Voster, Vos and Philip (1985). This building in the late Renaissance style, based broadly on the Doric Order, was designed in 1891 by Mr G. W. Smith, a prominent Port Elizabeth architect and was built by the firm Small and Morgan. The Opera House was opened ceremoniously on 1 December Architectural style: Victorian Renaissance. Type of site: Opera House.	Port Elizabeth, Central	Port Elizabeth	Provincial Heritage Site	33°57′45″S 25°37′18″E	The Port Elizabeth Opera House is an important example of early South Africa theatre architecture. Rehabilitated by stauch, Voster, Vos and Philip (1985). This building in the late Renaissance style, based broadly on the Doric Order, was designed in 1891 by Mr G. W. Smith, a prominent Port Elizabeth architect and was built by the firm Small and Morgan. The Opera House was opened ceremoniously on 1 December Architectural style: Victorian Renaissance. Type of site: Opera House.
9/2/073/0011	Port Elizabeth Ladies' Benevolent Society Building, 4-18 Westbourne Road, Port Elizabeth	Erected in 1899, the building comprising the Brister, Salomon and Goldschmidt Cottages of the Port Elizabeth ladies' Benevolent Society provides a simple architectural statement but at the same time an interesting insight into the social history of Port Elizabeth	Port Elizabeth	Port Elizabeth	Register	33°57′41″S 25°36′28″E	Erected in 1899, the building comprising the Brister, Salomon and Goldschmidt Cottages of the Port Elizabeth ladies' Benevolent Society provides a simple architectural statement but at the same time an interesting insight into the social history of Port Elizabeth
9/2/073/0012	24 Newington Road, Port Elizabeth	Windyridge, one of the best examples of authentic Victorian architecture in Port Elizabeth, is typical of townhouses built in the 1880s. Windyridge, one of the best examples of authentic Victorian architecture in Port Elizabeth, is typical of townhouses built in the 1880s.	Port Elizabeth	Port Elizabeth	Provincial Heritage Site	33°57′35″S 25°36′19″E	Windyridge, one of the best examples of authentic Victorian architecture in Port Elizabeth, is typical of townhouses built in the 1880s. Windyridge, one of the best examples of authentic Victorian architecture in Port Elizabeth, is typical of townhouses built in the 1880s.
9/2/073/0016/001	1 Cora Terrace, Port Elizabeth	Type of site: House. The houses in Cora Terrace are outstanding examples of Victorian architecture and contribute to the traditional aspect of this particular portion of Port Elizabeth.	Port Elizabeth, Central	Port Elizabeth	Provincial Heritage Site	33°57′56″S 25°37′00″E	Type of site: House. The houses in Cora Terrace are outstanding examples of Victorian architecture and contribute to the traditional aspect of this particular portion of Port Elizabeth.
9/2/073/0016/002	3 Cora Terrace, Port Elizabeth	Type of site: House. These houses in Cora Terrace are outstanding examples of Victorian architecture and contribute to the traditional aspect of this particular portion of Port Elizabeth.	Port Elizabeth, Central	Port Elizabeth	Provincial Heritage Site	33°57′56″S 25°37′00″E	Type of site: House. These houses in Cora Terrace are outstanding examples of Victorian architecture and contribute to the traditional aspect of this particular portion of Port Elizabeth.
9/2/073/0016/003	5 Cora Terrace, Port Elizabeth	Type of site: House. These houses in Cora Terrace are outstanding examples of Victorian architecture and contribute to the traditional aspect of this particular portion of Port Elizabeth.	Port Elizabeth, Central	Port Elizabeth	Provincial Heritage Site	33°57′56″S 25°37′00″E	Type of site: House. These houses in Cora Terrace are outstanding examples of Victorian architecture and contribute to the traditional aspect of this particular portion of Port Elizabeth.
9/2/073/0016/004	7 Cora Terrace, Port Elizabeth	Type of site: House. These houses in Cora Terrace are outstanding examples of Victorian architecture and contribute to the traditional aspect of this particular portion of Port Elizabeth.	Port Elizabeth, Central	Port Elizabeth	Provincial Heritage Site	33°57′56″S 25°37′00″E	Type of site: House. These houses in Cora Terrace are outstanding examples of Victorian architecture and contribute to the traditional aspect of this particular portion of Port Elizabeth.
9/2/073/0016/005	9 Cora Terrace, Port Elizabeth	Type of site: House. These houses are outstanding examples of Victorian architecture and contribute to the traditional aspect of this particular portion of the city.	Port Elizabeth, Central	Port Elizabeth	Provincial Heritage Site	33°57′56″S 25°37′00″E	Type of site: House. These houses are outstanding examples of Victorian architecture and contribute to the traditional aspect of this particular portion of the city.
9/2/073/0016/006	11 Cora Terrace, Port Elizabeth	Type of site: House. These houses in Cora Terrace are outstanding examples of Victorian architecture and contribute to the traditional aspect of this particular portion of Port Elizabeth.	Port Elizabeth, Central	Port Elizabeth	Provincial Heritage Site	33°57′56″S 25°37′00″E	Type of site: House. These houses in Cora Terrace are outstanding examples of Victorian architecture and contribute to the traditional aspect of this particular portion of Port Elizabeth.
9/2/073/0016/007	13 Cora Terrace, Port Elizabeth	Type of site: House. The houses in Cora Terrace are outstanding examples of Victorian architecture and contribute to the traditional aspect of this particular portion of Port Elizabeth.	Port Elizabeth, Central	Port Elizabeth	Provincial Heritage Site	33°57′56″S 25°37′00″E	Type of site: House. The houses in Cora Terrace are outstanding examples of Victorian architecture and contribute to the traditional aspect of this particular portion of Port Elizabeth.
9/2/073/0017	Fleming House, 20 Bird Street, Port Elizabeth	A double storey building in a plaster finish, with a cast iron veranda and small pane sash windows. The building is finely detailed and the internal spiral staircase is of special note. It is one of the first villas to have been built in this area. The b William Fleming was born in London in 1796 and arrived in Table Bay on 24 April 1818. He moved to Port Elizabeth in 1842 and joined the firm of Peter Heugh in which he became a partner, the firm being known as "Heugh and Fleming". Fleming was deeply invol Architectural style: A Regency double storey villa.. Type of site: House Previous use: Residential. Current use: Educational. Fleming House is an excellent example of a dwelling of a wealthy merchant in the mid-19th Century, executed in the Regency style. Built in 1853, the house has close associations with a number of leading citizens in the Cape Colony. During the 20th Century	Port Elizabeth, Central	Port Elizabeth	Provincial Heritage Site	33°57′54″S 25°37′01″E	A double storey building in a plaster finish, with a cast iron veranda and small pane sash windows. The building is finely detailed and the internal spiral staircase is of special note. It is one of the first villas to have been built in this area. The b William Fleming was born in London in 1796 and arrived in Table Bay on 24 April 1818. He moved to Port Elizabeth in 1842 and joined the firm of Peter Heugh in which he became a partner, the firm being known as "Heugh and Fleming". Fleming was deeply invol Architectural style: A Regency double storey villa.. Type of site: House Previous use: Residential. Current use: Educational. Fleming House is an excellent example of a dwelling of a wealthy merchant in the mid-19th Century, executed in the Regency style. Built in 1853, the house has close associations with a number of leading citizens in the Cape Colony. During the 20th Century
9/2/073/0018	Feathermarket Hall, Baakens street, Port Elizabeth	This hall, of which the original plan by Sir Wolfe-Barry of London was incorporated in the later plans of architect W. H. Miles, was erected during 1883–1885. It was opened on 10 December 1885 by the Governor, Sir Hercules Robinson. The South African Exhi Type of site: Market Hall. This hall, of which the original plan by Sir Wolfe-Barry of London was incorporated in the later plans of architect W H Miles, was erected during 1883–1885. It was opened on 10 December 1885 by the Governor, Sir Hercules Robinson. The South African Exhib	Port Elizabeth, Central	Port Elizabeth	Provincial Heritage Site	33°57′42″S 25°37′22″E	This hall, of which the original plan by Sir Wolfe-Barry of London was incorporated in the later plans of architect W. H. Miles, was erected during 1883–1885. It was opened on 10 December 1885 by the Governor, Sir Hercules Robinson. The South African Exhi Type of site: Market Hall. This hall, of which the original plan by Sir Wolfe-Barry of London was incorporated in the later plans of architect W H Miles, was erected during 1883–1885. It was opened on 10 December 1885 by the Governor, Sir Hercules Robinson. The South African Exhib Media related to Feathermarket Hall, Port Elizabeth at Wikimedia Commons
9/2/073/0019	Old Post Office, Court Street, Port Elizabeth	This imposing building, which is reminiscent of a Rhine-land Castle, was designed in 1897 by H. S. Greaves of the Public Works Department of the Cape Colonial Government. It was erected by J Kholer and Sons. Although only fully completed in 1902, the bui Architectural style: H. S. Greaves. Type of site: Post Office. This imposing building, which is reminiscent of a Rhineland Castle, was designed in 1897 by H S Greaves of the Public Works Department of the Cape Colonial Government. It was erected by J Kohler & Sons. Although only fully completed in 1902, the building	Port Elizabeth, Central	Port Elizabeth	Provincial Heritage Site	33°57′46″S 25°37′26″E	This imposing building, which is reminiscent of a Rhine-land Castle, was designed in 1897 by H. S. Greaves of the Public Works Department of the Cape Colonial Government. It was erected by J Kholer and Sons. Although only fully completed in 1902, the bui Architectural style: H. S. Greaves. Type of site: Post Office. This imposing building, which is reminiscent of a Rhineland Castle, was designed in 1897 by H S Greaves of the Public Works Department of the Cape Colonial Government. It was erected by J Kohler & Sons. Although only fully completed in 1902, the building Media related to Old Post Office, Port Elizabeth at Wikimedia Commons
9/2/073/0020	Alms houses, Bethelsdorp, Port Elizabeth District	These semi-detached houses were erected in 1822 in the vernacular style to house the poor of Bethelsdorp. They form an essential part of the historical part of Bethelsdorp. These semi-detached houses were erected in 1822 in the vernacular style to house the poor of Bethelsdorp. They form an essential part of the historical part of Bethelsdorp.	Bethelsdorp	Port Elizabeth	Provincial Heritage Site	33°52′55″S 25°30′02″E	These semi-detached houses were erected in 1822 in the vernacular style to house the poor of Bethelsdorp. They form an essential part of the historical part of Bethelsdorp. These semi-detached houses were erected in 1822 in the vernacular style to house the poor of Bethelsdorp. They form an essential part of the historical part of Bethelsdorp.
9/2/073/0020/001-01	Van der Kemp Memorial Church, Bethelsdorp, Port Elizabeth District	Type of site: Church. The Van der Kemp church in Bethelsdorp, Port Elizabeth, has significance in the memory of Dr van der Kemp and his struggles for the indigenous people of South Africa, at a time when such thoughts were almost considered blasphemy by the powers that be.	Bethelsdorp	Port Elizabeth	Provincial Heritage Site	33°52′55″S 25°30′02″E	Type of site: Church. The Van der Kemp church in Bethelsdorp, Port Elizabeth, has significance in the memory of Dr van der Kemp and his struggles for the indigenous people of South Africa, at a time when such thoughts were almost considered blasphemy by the powers that be.
9/2/073/0020/001-02	David Livingstone Cottage, Bethelsdorp, Port Elizabeth District	The Van der Kemp church in Bethelsdorp, Port Elizabeth, has significance in the memory of Dr van der Kemp and his struggles for the indigenous people of South Africa, at a time when such thoughts were almost considered blasphemy by the powers that be.	Bethelsdorp	Port Elizabeth	Provincial Heritage Site	33°52′55″S 25°30′02″E	The Van der Kemp church in Bethelsdorp, Port Elizabeth, has significance in the memory of Dr van der Kemp and his struggles for the indigenous people of South Africa, at a time when such thoughts were almost considered blasphemy by the powers that be.
9/2/073/0021	Old Grey Institute, Belmont Terrace, Port Elizabeth	The building is partly faced in stone with brick lintels over some openings. Areas of the facades are plastered and include Tudor mouldings above the windows. The composition consists of a central double storeyed corps-de-logis with tower and two parall This old building faces the well-known Donkin Reserve with its characteristic Donkin Memorial and lighthouse. The 1850s saw a considerable revival in higher education in the Cape Colony. In this revival Sir George Grey, the governor from 1854 to 1861, pl Architectural style: Neo Gothic Collegiate. Type of site: Educational. The establishment of the Grey Institute is closely associated with the introduction of organised education in the Cape Province under the administration of Sir George Grey. The buildings of the Grey Institute are in the neo-Gothic style and form an essen	Port Elizabeth, Central	Port Elizabeth	Provincial Heritage Site	33°57′44″S 25°37′08″E	The building is partly faced in stone with brick lintels over some openings. Areas of the facades are plastered and include Tudor mouldings above the windows. The composition consists of a central double storeyed corps-de-logis with tower and two parall This old building faces the well-known Donkin Reserve with its characteristic Donkin Memorial and lighthouse. The 1850s saw a considerable revival in higher education in the Cape Colony. In this revival Sir George Grey, the governor from 1854 to 1861, pl Architectural style: Neo Gothic Collegiate. Type of site: Educational. The establishment of the Grey Institute is closely associated with the introduction of organised education in the Cape Province under the administration of Sir George Grey. The buildings of the Grey Institute are in the neo-Gothic style and form an essen Media related to Old Grey Institute at Wikimedia Commons
9/2/073/0021-001	Old Parsonage, Pearson Street, Port Elizabeth	A double storey house forming an integral part, of the Old Grey Institute group of buildings. The building is noted for its twin gables, wrap-around veranda, tracery and entrance porch. Architectural style: Victorian house. Type of site: House.	Port Elizabeth, Central	Port Elizabeth	Provincial Heritage Site	33°57′48″S 25°36′56″E	A double storey house forming an integral part, of the Old Grey Institute group of buildings. The building is noted for its twin gables, wrap-around veranda, tracery and entrance porch. Architectural style: Victorian house. Type of site: House.
9/2/073/0022	7 Castle Hill, Port Elizabeth	A double storey house restored and used as a museum. It is one of the best examples of this style of dwelling in Port Elizabeth. Renovations by Harold B. Smith. As far as can be established, this old house is the oldest surviving dwelling in Port Elizabeth and was built by the Rev. Francis McClelland, a priest of the Church of England who arrived in 1820 with the Irish Party under William Parker. This party was s Architectural style: Late Georgian. Type of site: House. The house, No. 7 Castle Hill, was built in 1825 for the Rev. Francis McCleland, first colonial chaplain in Port Elizabeth. It is an excellent example of early 19th century town houses in the Eastern Province. It is amongst the earliest substantial building	Port Elizabeth, Central	Port Elizabeth	Provincial Heritage Site	33°57′49″S 25°37′18″E	A double storey house restored and used as a museum. It is one of the best examples of this style of dwelling in Port Elizabeth. Renovations by Harold B. Smith. As far as can be established, this old house is the oldest surviving dwelling in Port Elizabeth and was built by the Rev. Francis McClelland, a priest of the Church of England who arrived in 1820 with the Irish Party under William Parker. This party was s Architectural style: Late Georgian. Type of site: House. The house, No. 7 Castle Hill, was built in 1825 for the Rev. Francis McCleland, first colonial chaplain in Port Elizabeth. It is an excellent example of early 19th century town houses in the Eastern Province. It is amongst the earliest substantial building Media related to 7 Castle Hill, Port Elizabeth at Wikimedia Commons
9/2/073/0022/001	Collection, 7 Castle Hill, Port Elizabeth		Port Elizabeth, Central	Port Elizabeth	Heritage Object	33°57′49″S 25°37′18″E	
9/2/073/0023	Old Harbour Board Building, Fleming Street, Port Elizabeth	A three storey building symmetrically composed with fully developed detail. The ornate entrance gates and the interior carpentry are of particular note. The building was declared a national monument in 1978. The striking Harbour Board building, also known as the White House, is situated in Fleming Street, near the harbour and the railway station in the immediate vicinity of the Port Elizabeth city hall. The corner stone of this building, for nearly seventy ye Architectural style: Edwardian Baroque with Art Nouveau interior. This building is proclaimed on account of its outstanding architecture, it was built in 1904, and is an excellent example of the so-called Art Nouveau in architecture.	Port Elizabeth, Central	Port Elizabeth	Provincial Heritage Site	33°57′42″S 25°37′36″E	A three storey building symmetrically composed with fully developed detail. The ornate entrance gates and the interior carpentry are of particular note. The building was declared a national monument in 1978. The striking Harbour Board building, also known as the White House, is situated in Fleming Street, near the harbour and the railway station in the immediate vicinity of the Port Elizabeth city hall. The corner stone of this building, for nearly seventy ye Architectural style: Edwardian Baroque with Art Nouveau interior. This building is proclaimed on account of its outstanding architecture, it was built in 1904, and is an excellent example of the so-called Art Nouveau in architecture. Media related to Old Harbour Board Building, Port Elizabeth at Wikimedia Commons
9/2/073/0024	Terrace, Donkin Street, Port Elizabeth	These houses face the northern side of the Donkin Reserve. They stand in a terraced row on a steep hill, each one slightly lower than the one above it. These houses constitute a typical Victorian-style terrace, especially remarkable for the manner in whi. These houses are an outstanding example of Victorian architecture and contribute to the traditional aspect of that part of the city.	Port Elizabeth	Port Elizabeth	Provincial Heritage Site	33°57′38″S 25°37′13″E	These houses face the northern side of the Donkin Reserve. They stand in a terraced row on a steep hill, each one slightly lower than the one above it. These houses constitute a typical Victorian-style terrace, especially remarkable for the manner in whi. These houses are an outstanding example of Victorian architecture and contribute to the traditional aspect of that part of the city.
9/2/073/0024/001	31 Donkin Street, Port Elizabeth	These houses are an outstanding example of Victorian architecture and contribute to the traditional aspect of that part of the city. Type of site: House.	Port Elizabeth, Central	Port Elizabeth	Provincial Heritage Site	33°57′38″S 25°37′11″E	These houses are an outstanding example of Victorian architecture and contribute to the traditional aspect of that part of the city. Type of site: House.
9/2/073/0024/002	33 Donkin Street, Port Elizabeth	These houses are an outstanding example of Victorian architecture and contribute to the traditional aspect of that part of the city. Type of site: House.	Port Elizabeth, Central	Port Elizabeth	Provincial Heritage Site	33°57′38″S 25°37′10″E	These houses are an outstanding example of Victorian architecture and contribute to the traditional aspect of that part of the city. Type of site: House.
9/2/073/0024/003	35 Donkin Street, Port Elizabeth	Type of site: House. These houses are an outstanding example of Victorian architecture and contribute to the traditional aspect of that part of the city.	Port Elizabeth, Central	Port Elizabeth	Provincial Heritage Site	33°57′39″S 25°37′10″E	Type of site: House. These houses are an outstanding example of Victorian architecture and contribute to the traditional aspect of that part of the city.
9/2/073/0024/004	37 Donkin Street, Port Elizabeth	Type of site: House. These houses are an outstanding example of Victorian architecture and contribute to the traditional aspect of that part of the city.	Port Elizabeth, Central	Port Elizabeth	Provincial Heritage Site	33°57′39″S 25°37′10″E	Type of site: House. These houses are an outstanding example of Victorian architecture and contribute to the traditional aspect of that part of the city.
9/2/073/0024/005	39 Donkin Street, Port Elizabeth	Type of site: House. These houses are an outstanding example of Victorian architecture and contribute to the traditional aspect of that part of the city.	Port Elizabeth, Central	Port Elizabeth	Provincial Heritage Site	33°57′39″S 25°37′10″E	Type of site: House. These houses are an outstanding example of Victorian architecture and contribute to the traditional aspect of that part of the city.
9/2/073/0024/006	41 Donkin Street, Port Elizabeth	Type of site: House. These houses are an outstanding example of Victorian architecture and contribute to the traditional aspect of that part of the city.	Port Elizabeth, Central	Port Elizabeth	Provincial Heritage Site	33°57′39″S 25°37′10″E	Type of site: House. These houses are an outstanding example of Victorian architecture and contribute to the traditional aspect of that part of the city.
9/2/073/0024/007	43 Donkin Street, Port Elizabeth	Type of site: House. These houses are an outstanding example of Victorian architecture and contribute to the traditional aspect of that part of the city.	Port Elizabeth, Central	Port Elizabeth	Provincial Heritage Site	33°57′39″S 25°37′09″E	Type of site: House. These houses are an outstanding example of Victorian architecture and contribute to the traditional aspect of that part of the city.
9/2/073/0024/008	45 Donkin Street, Port Elizabeth	Type of site: House. These houses are an outstanding example of Victorian architecture and contribute to the traditional aspect of that part of the city.	Port Elizabeth, Central	Port Elizabeth	Provincial Heritage Site	33°57′40″S 25°37′09″E	Type of site: House. These houses are an outstanding example of Victorian architecture and contribute to the traditional aspect of that part of the city.
9/2/073/0024/009	47 Donkin Street, Port Elizabeth	Type of site: House. These houses are an outstanding example of Victorian architecture and contribute to the traditional aspect of that part of the city.	Port Elizabeth, Central	Port Elizabeth	Provincial Heritage Site	33°57′40″S 25°37′09″E	Type of site: House. These houses are an outstanding example of Victorian architecture and contribute to the traditional aspect of that part of the city.
9/2/073/0024/010	49 Donkin Street, Port Elizabeth	Type of site: House. These houses are an outstanding example of Victorian architecture and contribute to the traditional aspect of that part of the city.	Port Elizabeth, Central	Port Elizabeth	Provincial Heritage Site	33°57′40″S 25°37′09″E	Type of site: House. These houses are an outstanding example of Victorian architecture and contribute to the traditional aspect of that part of the city.
9/2/073/0024/011	51 Donkin Street, Port Elizabeth	Type of site: House. These houses are an outstanding example of Victorian architecture and contribute to the traditional aspect of that part of the city.	Port Elizabeth, Central	Port Elizabeth	Provincial Heritage Site	33°57′40″S 25°37′08″E	Type of site: House. These houses are an outstanding example of Victorian architecture and contribute to the traditional aspect of that part of the city.
9/2/073/0024/012	53 Donkin Street, Port Elizabeth	Type of site: House. These houses are an outstanding example of Victorian architecture and contribute to the traditional aspect of that part of the city.	Port Elizabeth, Central	Port Elizabeth	Provincial Heritage Site	33°57′40″S 25°37′08″E	Type of site: House. These houses are an outstanding example of Victorian architecture and contribute to the traditional aspect of that part of the city.
9/2/073/0024/013	55 Donkin Street, Port Elizabeth	Type of site: House. These houses are an outstanding example of Victorian architecture and contribute to the traditional aspect of that part of the city.	Port Elizabeth, Central	Port Elizabeth	Provincial Heritage Site	33°57′40″S 25°37′08″E	Type of site: House. These houses are an outstanding example of Victorian architecture and contribute to the traditional aspect of that part of the city.
9/2/073/0024/014	21/23 Donkin Street, Port Elizabeth	Architectural style: Victorian. Type of site: House. These double-storeyed semi-detached houses with their Victorian and Georgian features were erected shortly after the turn of the century. These in Donkin Street, situated opposite the Donkin Reserve, form part of a unique row of terrace houses in the Vict	Port Elizabeth, Central	Port Elizabeth	Provincial Heritage Site	33°57′37″S 25°37′12″E	Architectural style: Victorian. Type of site: House. These double-storeyed semi-detached houses with their Victorian and Georgian features were erected shortly after the turn of the century. These in Donkin Street, situated opposite the Donkin Reserve, form part of a unique row of terrace houses in the Vict
9/2/073/0024/015	25 Donkin Street, Port Elizabeth	Type of site: House. These double-storeyed semi-detached houses with their Victorian and Georgian features were erected shortly after the turn of the century. These in Donkin Street, situated opposite the Donkin Reserve, form part of a unique row of terrace houses in the Vict	Port Elizabeth, Central	Port Elizabeth	Provincial Heritage Site	33°57′38″S 25°37′12″E	Type of site: House. These double-storeyed semi-detached houses with their Victorian and Georgian features were erected shortly after the turn of the century. These in Donkin Street, situated opposite the Donkin Reserve, form part of a unique row of terrace houses in the Vict
9/2/073/0024/016	27 Donkin Street, Port Elizabeth	Type of site: House. These double-storeyed semi-detached houses with their Victorian and Georgian features were erected shortly after the turn of the century. These in Donkin Street, situated opposite the Donkin Reserve, form part of a unique row of terrace houses in the Vict	Port Elizabeth, Central	Port Elizabeth	Provincial Heritage Site	33°57′38″S 25°37′11″E	Type of site: House. These double-storeyed semi-detached houses with their Victorian and Georgian features were erected shortly after the turn of the century. These in Donkin Street, situated opposite the Donkin Reserve, form part of a unique row of terrace houses in the Vict
9/2/073/0025	10 Castle Hill, Port Elizabeth	A single storey cottage with plaster finish, a slate roof and cottage paned sash windows. The house has been declared a national monument. These typical settler houses date from about 1840 and were originally the properties of Constable Sterley. Together with the adjacent historic house at 7 Castle Hill these buildings from an interesting architectural complex. Architectural style: Georgian. Type of site: House.	Port Elizabeth, Central	Port Elizabeth	Provincial Heritage Site	33°57′49″S 25°37′19″E	A single storey cottage with plaster finish, a slate roof and cottage paned sash windows. The house has been declared a national monument. These typical settler houses date from about 1840 and were originally the properties of Constable Sterley. Together with the adjacent historic house at 7 Castle Hill these buildings from an interesting architectural complex. Architectural style: Georgian. Type of site: House.
9/2/073/0026	12 Castle Hill, Port Elizabeth	A single storey cottage with a slate roof and cottage paned sash windows. A declared national monument. Architectural style: Georgian. Type of site: House.	Port Elizabeth, Central	Port Elizabeth	Provincial Heritage Site	33°57′49″S 25°37′18″E	A single storey cottage with a slate roof and cottage paned sash windows. A declared national monument. Architectural style: Georgian. Type of site: House.
9/2/073/0027	Library, Main Street, Port Elizabeth	The Library with its intricate decorative facade, its superb interior spaces and its stained glass windows was declared a National Monument in 1980. The erection of this library was made possible by a donation of R20 000 from the estate of William Savage and a subsidy from the Colonial Government. The building was designed by Henry Cheers and was officially opened on 29 July 1902. The style of the pub Architectural style: Late Victorian with Flemish Renaissance influences.. Type of site: Library.	Port Elizabeth, Central	Port Elizabeth	Provincial Heritage Site	33°57′44″S 25°37′22″E	The Library with its intricate decorative facade, its superb interior spaces and its stained glass windows was declared a National Monument in 1980. The erection of this library was made possible by a donation of R20 000 from the estate of William Savage and a subsidy from the Colonial Government. The building was designed by Henry Cheers and was officially opened on 29 July 1902. The style of the pub Architectural style: Late Victorian with Flemish Renaissance influences.. Type of site: Library. Media related to Port Elizabeth Main Library at Wikimedia Commons
9/2/073/0028	City Hall, Market Square, Port Elizabeth	A double storey town hall with stone and plaster finish. Completed in 1862, the clock tower was added in 1883. After being destroyed by fire it was reconstructed in 1981 by Vos and Philip. Of great historic importance, it forms the focus of Market Squ Architectural style: Victorian Neo-Classical. Type of site: City Hall. The neo-Classical style of this building impressed numerous travellers and writers in the 19th century and is today still regarded as one of the most imposing	Port Elizabeth, Central	Port Elizabeth	Provincial Heritage Site	33°57′45″S 25°37′25″E	A double storey town hall with stone and plaster finish. Completed in 1862, the clock tower was added in 1883. After being destroyed by fire it was reconstructed in 1981 by Vos and Philip. Of great historic importance, it forms the focus of Market Squ Architectural style: Victorian Neo-Classical. Type of site: City Hall. The neo-Classical style of this building impressed numerous travellers and writers in the 19th century and is today still regarded as one of the most imposing Media related to Port Elizabeth Town Hall at Wikimedia Commons
9/2/073/0029	Erf 4763, 4764, Market Square, Port Elizabeth	A landscaped urban space paved in a geometric patterned facebrick, consultant C. Todd Welsh in 1981. The Market Square has great historic significance in the development of Port Elizabeth and is surrounded by many buildings of historic importance. The Market Square forms an important part of the historic centre of Port Elizabeth.	Port Elizabeth, Central	Port Elizabeth	Provincial Heritage Site	33°57′44″S 25°37′24″E	A landscaped urban space paved in a geometric patterned facebrick, consultant C. Todd Welsh in 1981. The Market Square has great historic significance in the development of Port Elizabeth and is surrounded by many buildings of historic importance. The Market Square forms an important part of the historic centre of Port Elizabeth.
9/2/073/0030	Atheneum Club, Belmont Terrace, Port Elizabeth	This double storey building was built to house the Atheneum Club, an institute founded in the early days of Port Elizabeth to promote cultural activities. The Belmont Terrace facade has two wings, joined by a central arched entrance porch with classical This late Victorian building, with its impressive neoclassical elements, consists of two sections, which were opened in 1896 and 1901 respectively. Architectural style: Edwardian Baroque. Type of site: Club.	Port Elizabeth, Central	Port Elizabeth	Provincial Heritage Site	33°57′51″S 25°37′13″E	This double storey building was built to house the Atheneum Club, an institute founded in the early days of Port Elizabeth to promote cultural activities. The Belmont Terrace facade has two wings, joined by a central arched entrance porch with classical This late Victorian building, with its impressive neoclassical elements, consists of two sections, which were opened in 1896 and 1901 respectively. Architectural style: Edwardian Baroque. Type of site: Club. Media related to Atheneum Club, Port Elizabeth at Wikimedia Commons
9/2/073/0031	Pearson Conservatory, St George's Park, Port Elizabeth	This impressive conservatory with its Victorian characteristics was designed and erected by Boyd and Son of Paisley, Scotland, dismantled into sections and transported to Port Elizabeth where it was re-erected under the supervision of Mr Frazer of Boyds.	Port Elizabeth	Port Elizabeth	Provincial Heritage Site	33°57′56″S 25°36′22″E	This impressive conservatory with its Victorian characteristics was designed and erected by Boyd and Son of Paisley, Scotland, dismantled into sections and transported to Port Elizabeth where it was re-erected under the supervision of Mr Frazer of Boyds. Media related to Pearson Conservatory at Wikimedia Commons
9/2/073/0032	Prince Alfred's Guard Memorial, St George's Park, Port Elizabeth	The Prince Alfred's Guard Memorial is one of the largest and heaviest architectural products in the Victorian idiom manufactured by the Saracen foundry of Walter MacFarlane of Glasgow in Scotland.	Port Elizabeth	Port Elizabeth	Provincial Heritage Site	33°57′50″S 25°36′22″E	The Prince Alfred's Guard Memorial is one of the largest and heaviest architectural products in the Victorian idiom manufactured by the Saracen foundry of Walter MacFarlane of Glasgow in Scotland. Media related to Prince Alfred's Guard Memorial at Wikimedia Commons
9/2/073/0033	Horse Memorial, Cape Road, Port Elizabeth	This memorial, designed by Joseph Whitehead and cast in bronze by Thames Dillon Works in Surrey, was unveiled on 11 February 1905 by the Mayor of Port Elizabeth, Mr Alexander Fettes. The monument commemorates the horses that suffered and died during the A Type of site: Memorial.	Port Elizabeth	Port Elizabeth	Provincial Heritage Site	33°57′44″S 25°36′32″E	This memorial, designed by Joseph Whitehead and cast in bronze by Thames Dillon Works in Surrey, was unveiled on 11 February 1905 by the Mayor of Port Elizabeth, Mr Alexander Fettes. The monument commemorates the horses that suffered and died during the A Type of site: Memorial. Media related to Horse Memorial at Wikimedia Commons
9/2/073/0034	14 Constitution Hill, Port Elizabeth	A double storey dwelling recently renovated. These double-storeyed semi-detached houses with their Victorian and Georgian features were erected shortly after the turn of the century. These in Donkin Street, situated opposite the Donkin Reserve, form part of a unique row of terrace houses in the Vict Architectural style: Victorian townhouse. Type of site: House.	Port Elizabeth, Central	Port Elizabeth	Provincial Heritage Site	33°57′38″S 25°37′11″E	A double storey dwelling recently renovated. These double-storeyed semi-detached houses with their Victorian and Georgian features were erected shortly after the turn of the century. These in Donkin Street, situated opposite the Donkin Reserve, form part of a unique row of terrace houses in the Vict Architectural style: Victorian townhouse. Type of site: House.
9/2/073/0035	8 Whitlock Street, Port Elizabeth	A magnificent cycad tree in the small garden between the house and the pavement enhances the setting. It has been declared a National Monument. Architectural style: Victorian semi-detached townhouse with Regency style veranda. Type of site: House. These double-storeyed semi-detached houses with their Victorian and Georgian features were erected shortly after the turn of the century. These in Donkin Street, situated opposite the Donkin Reserve, form part of a unique row of terrace houses in the Vict	Port Elizabeth, Central	Port Elizabeth	Provincial Heritage Site	33°57′43″S 25°37′00″E	A magnificent cycad tree in the small garden between the house and the pavement enhances the setting. It has been declared a National Monument. Architectural style: Victorian semi-detached townhouse with Regency style veranda. Type of site: House. These double-storeyed semi-detached houses with their Victorian and Georgian features were erected shortly after the turn of the century. These in Donkin Street, situated opposite the Donkin Reserve, form part of a unique row of terrace houses in the Vict
9/2/073/0036	10 Whitlock Street, Port Elizabeth	A small garden between the house and the pavement enhances the setting. It has been declared a National Monument. Architectural style: Victorian semi-detached townhouse with Regency style veranda. Type of site: House. These double-storeyed semi-detached houses with their Victorian and Georgian features were erected shortly after the turn of the century. These in Donkin Street, situated opposite the Donkin Reserve, form part of a unique row of terrace houses in the Vict	Port Elizabeth, Central	Port Elizabeth	Provincial Heritage Site	33°57′46″S 25°37′00″E	A small garden between the house and the pavement enhances the setting. It has been declared a National Monument. Architectural style: Victorian semi-detached townhouse with Regency style veranda. Type of site: House. These double-storeyed semi-detached houses with their Victorian and Georgian features were erected shortly after the turn of the century. These in Donkin Street, situated opposite the Donkin Reserve, form part of a unique row of terrace houses in the Vict
9/2/073/0037	T S Lanherne, Humewood Road, Port Elizabeth	This impressive Victorian house was erected in 1894 for Mr R. H. Hammersley-Heenen, resident engineer and general manager of the railways. During the Second World War it served as a convalescent home for soldiers, sailors and airmen. 1 303 of whom were tr.	Port Elizabeth	Port Elizabeth	Provincial Heritage Site	33°58′24″S 25°38′27″E	This impressive Victorian house was erected in 1894 for Mr R. H. Hammersley-Heenen, resident engineer and general manager of the railways. During the Second World War it served as a convalescent home for soldiers, sailors and airmen. 1 303 of whom were tr.
9/2/073/0038	Miracle Cannon from Wreck of Sacramento, King George VI Art Gallery, Park Drive, Port Elizabeth	Type of site: Gun.	Port Elizabeth	Port Elizabeth	Heritage Object		Type of site: Gun.
9/2/073/0039	Hillside House, 14 Bird Street, Port Elizabeth	A double storey dwelling with plaster finish, finely detailed gable-ends and elaborate timber veranda. The building is in scale with the surrounding area but the original character is detracted from by the enclosed first floor veranda. The setting of th Architectural style: Regency dwelling.	Port Elizabeth, Central	Port Elizabeth	Provincial Heritage Site	33°57′55″S 25°37′03″E	A double storey dwelling with plaster finish, finely detailed gable-ends and elaborate timber veranda. The building is in scale with the surrounding area but the original character is detracted from by the enclosed first floor veranda. The setting of th Architectural style: Regency dwelling.
9/2/073/0040	Old Erica Girls' School, Richmond Hill, Port Elizabeth	Type of site: School.	Port Elizabeth	Port Elizabeth	Provincial Heritage Site	33°57′24″S 25°36′52″E	Type of site: School. Media related to Old Erica Girls' School at Wikimedia Commons
9/2/073/0041	Campanile, Strand Street, Port Elizabeth	Modelled on a Venetian campanile, this tower was built to commemorate the arrival of the 1820 settlers.	Port Elizabeth, Central	Port Elizabeth	Provincial Heritage Site	33°57′39″S 25°37′30″E	Modelled on a Venetian campanile, this tower was built to commemorate the arrival of the 1820 settlers. Media related to Campanile, Port Elizabeth at Wikimedia Commons
9/2/073/0042	8 Bird Street, Port Elizabeth	A double storey dwelling with finely detailed timber veranda which is painted in Regency stripes. The building is in scale with the surrounding area and the historic character of the street. Alterations done by Jones and McWilliams in 1956. Architectural style: Victorian townhouse with Regency veranda. Type of site: House.	Port Elizabeth, Central	Port Elizabeth	Provincial Heritage Site	33°57′53″S 25°37′05″E	A double storey dwelling with finely detailed timber veranda which is painted in Regency stripes. The building is in scale with the surrounding area and the historic character of the street. Alterations done by Jones and McWilliams in 1956. Architectural style: Victorian townhouse with Regency veranda. Type of site: House.
9/2/073/0046	Prince Alfred's Guard Drill Hall, Prospect Hill, Port Elizabeth	The headquarters of the Prince Alfred's Guard Regiment, one of the oldest volunteer regiments in the country. The building has a central section with symmetrical side projections, in the Beau Art tradition. The Edwardian facade is an addition to the Vic. Architectural style: Edwardian Baroque institutional. Type of site: Drill Hall Current use: Military : Drill Hall.	Port Elizabeth, Central	Port Elizabeth	Provincial Heritage Site	33°57′48″S 25°37′14″E	The headquarters of the Prince Alfred's Guard Regiment, one of the oldest volunteer regiments in the country. The building has a central section with symmetrical side projections, in the Beau Art tradition. The Edwardian facade is an addition to the Vic. Architectural style: Edwardian Baroque institutional. Type of site: Drill Hall Current use: Military : Drill Hall. Media related to Prince Alfred's Guard Drill Hall at Wikimedia Commons
9/2/073/0049	Holy Trinity Anglican Church, Havelock Street, Port Elizabeth	The original church was built in 1862 and only the walls remain today after a fire devastated the building in 1897. The roof and the interior were rebuilt in 1898. Architectural style: Victorian Gothic. Type of site: Church.	Port Elizabeth	Port Elizabeth	Provincial Heritage Site	33°57′46″S 25°36′53″E	The original church was built in 1862 and only the walls remain today after a fire devastated the building in 1897. The roof and the interior were rebuilt in 1898. Architectural style: Victorian Gothic. Type of site: Church. Media related to Holy Trinity Anglican Church, Port Elizabeth at Wikimedia Commons
9/2/073/0049-001	Holy Trinity Anglican Church Hall, Havelock Street, Port Elizabeth	Simple hall gabled on all four sides, with entrance portico, buttresses, oculus and lancet windows. Architectural style: Victorian Gothic Revival. Type of site: Church Hall.	Port Elizabeth	Port Elizabeth	Provincial Heritage Site	33°57′46″S 25°36′53″E	Simple hall gabled on all four sides, with entrance portico, buttresses, oculus and lancet windows. Architectural style: Victorian Gothic Revival. Type of site: Church Hall.
9/2/073/0052	Redhouse Village Hall, 31 Paterson Street, Redhouse, Port Elizabeth	This is one of the very few large wood and iron structures left standing in the Eastern Cape. The Redhouse village is much cherished by the residents of Redhouse village. This hall is an excellent example of a community based project. It was raised by th	Port Elizabeth, Redhouse	Port Elizabeth	Register	33°50′28″S 25°34′10″E	This is one of the very few large wood and iron structures left standing in the Eastern Cape. The Redhouse village is much cherished by the residents of Redhouse village. This hall is an excellent example of a community based project. It was raised by th
9/2/073/0055	South End Museum, Humewood Road, Port Elizabeth (See 9/2/073/0061)	Type of site: Club.	Port Elizabeth	Port Elizabeth	Provisional Protection	33°58′10″S 25°37′46″E	Type of site: Club.
9/2/073/0057	Robin Hill, 1 Harris Street, Port Elizabeth	Type of site: House Current use: Residential.	Port Elizabeth, South End	Port Elizabeth	Provincial Heritage Site	33°58′08″S 25°36′58″E	Type of site: House Current use: Residential.
9/2/073/0060	Shri Siva Subramanier and Marriamman Aulayam, Upper Valley Road, South End, Port Elizabeth	The Shri Siva Subramanier & Marriamman Aulayam is the oldest place of Hindu worship in the Eastern Cape. As is to be expected, it has grown throughout the years, but apart from the face brick portico to the oldest temple, its integrity remains intact.	Port Elizabeth, South End	Port Elizabeth	Register	33°58′13″S 25°37′07″E	The Shri Siva Subramanier & Marriamman Aulayam is the oldest place of Hindu worship in the Eastern Cape. As is to be expected, it has grown throughout the years, but apart from the face brick portico to the oldest temple, its integrity remains intact.
9/2/073/0062	15 Pearson Street, Port Elizabeth	A double storey dwelling with some of the original stone construction exposed on the side of the house. The building has notable veranda trellising and the original character is maintained except for the roof replacement. Architectural style: Regency townhouse. Type of site: House.	Port Elizabeth, Central	Port Elizabeth	Register	33°57′46″S 25°37′03″E	A double storey dwelling with some of the original stone construction exposed on the side of the house. The building has notable veranda trellising and the original character is maintained except for the roof replacement. Architectural style: Regency townhouse. Type of site: House.
9/2/073/0063	21 Prospect Hill, Port Elizabeth	A double storey dwelling finished in plaster and covered by a hipped roof. the two fine chimneys, sliding sash windows and fine detailing to the veranda structure are noteworthy. Architectural style: Victorian semi-detached house with regency style veranda. Type of site: House. No 21 Prospect Hill is a fine example of a mid-Victorian building with Georgian influences. It is well worthy of recognition and preservation.	Port Elizabeth	Port Elizabeth	Register	33°57′47″S 25°37′15″E	A double storey dwelling finished in plaster and covered by a hipped roof. the two fine chimneys, sliding sash windows and fine detailing to the veranda structure are noteworthy. Architectural style: Victorian semi-detached house with regency style veranda. Type of site: House. No 21 Prospect Hill is a fine example of a mid-Victorian building with Georgian influences. It is well worthy of recognition and preservation.
