= Harbour Board Building =

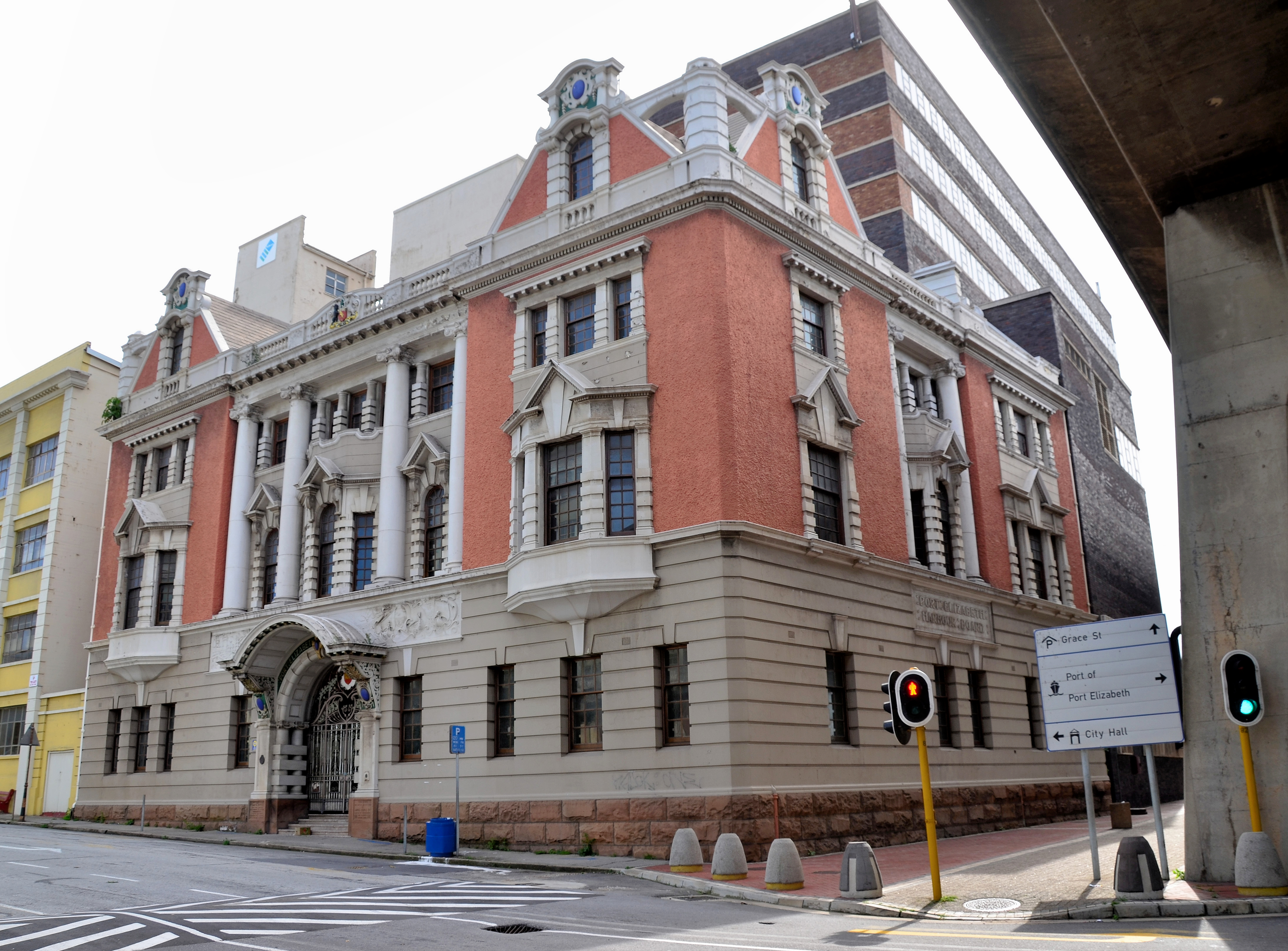
- The Harbour Board Building in 2015
- Click on the map for a fullscreen view

General information
- Location: Port Elizabeth, South Africa
- Coordinates: 33°57′43.9″S 25°37′30.15″E

The Harbour Board Building is a historic building located in Port Elizabeth, South Africa.

== History ==
The building, designed by the architecture firm Jones & McWilliams, was used for harbour administration by South African Railways and Harbours for over seventy years. The foundation stone was laid on 14 January 1904 by J. Searle, then Managing Commissioner of the Port Elizabeth Harbour Board. The building was declared a national monument in 1968 and later restored in 1998 by Portnet with architect John Rushmere.

== Description ==
The building is located along Fleming Street in the centre of Port Elizabeth.

It is distinguished by its imposing stone façade and interiors richly decorated with fine wood and stained glass. Its interiors feature an Art Nouveau style of which it is considered one of the finest examples in South Africa.

== Gallery ==
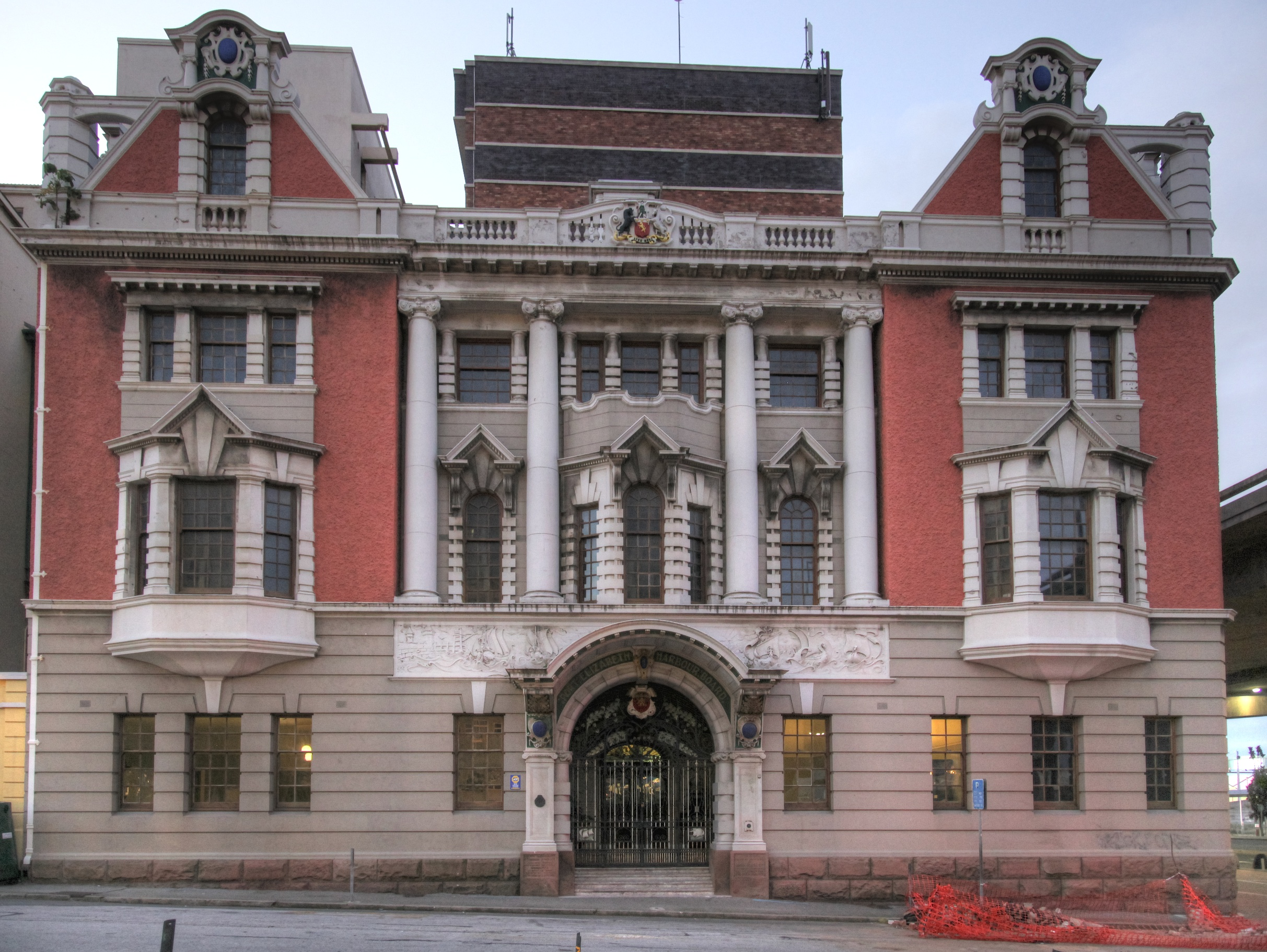

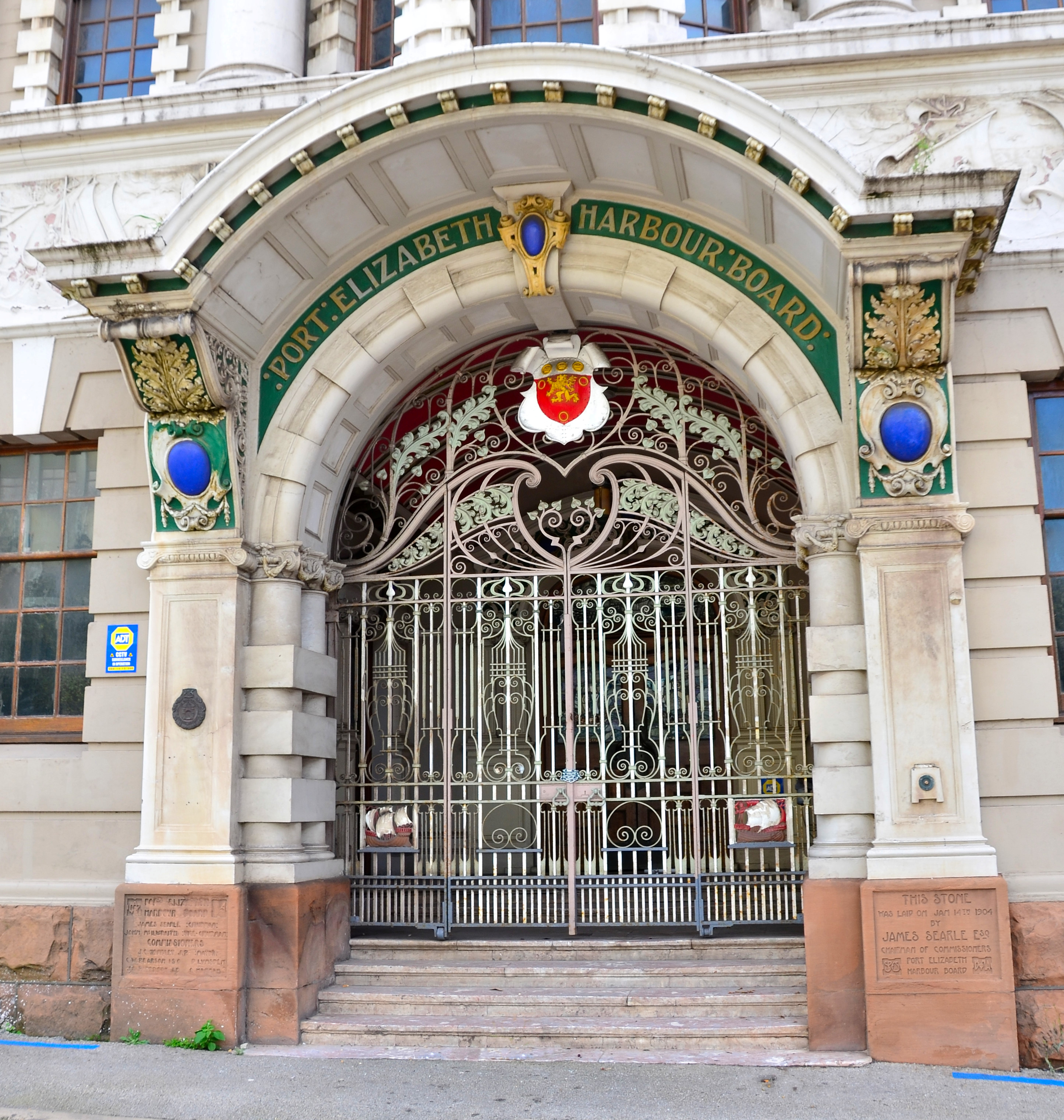

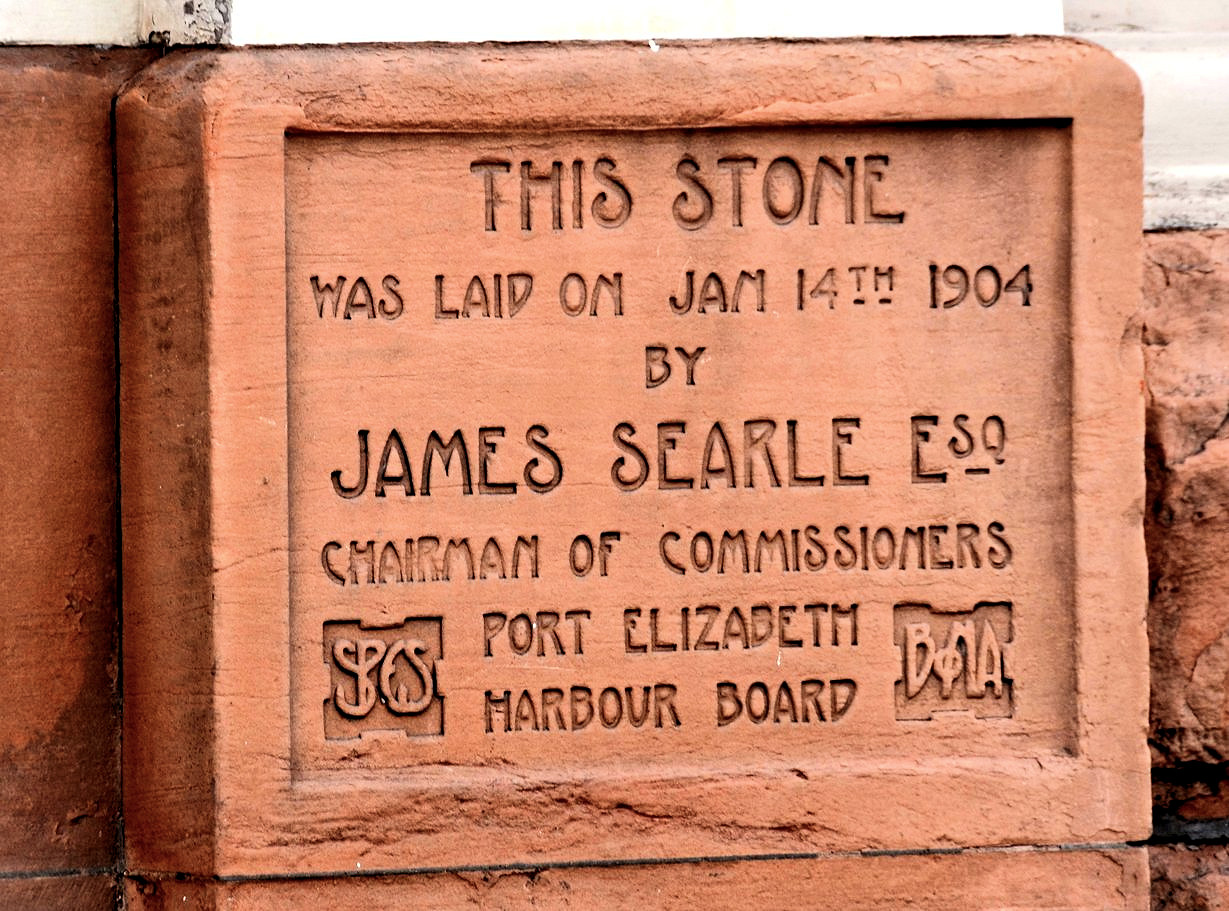

== See also ==
- List of heritage sites in Port Elizabeth
