= Port Elizabeth Main Library =

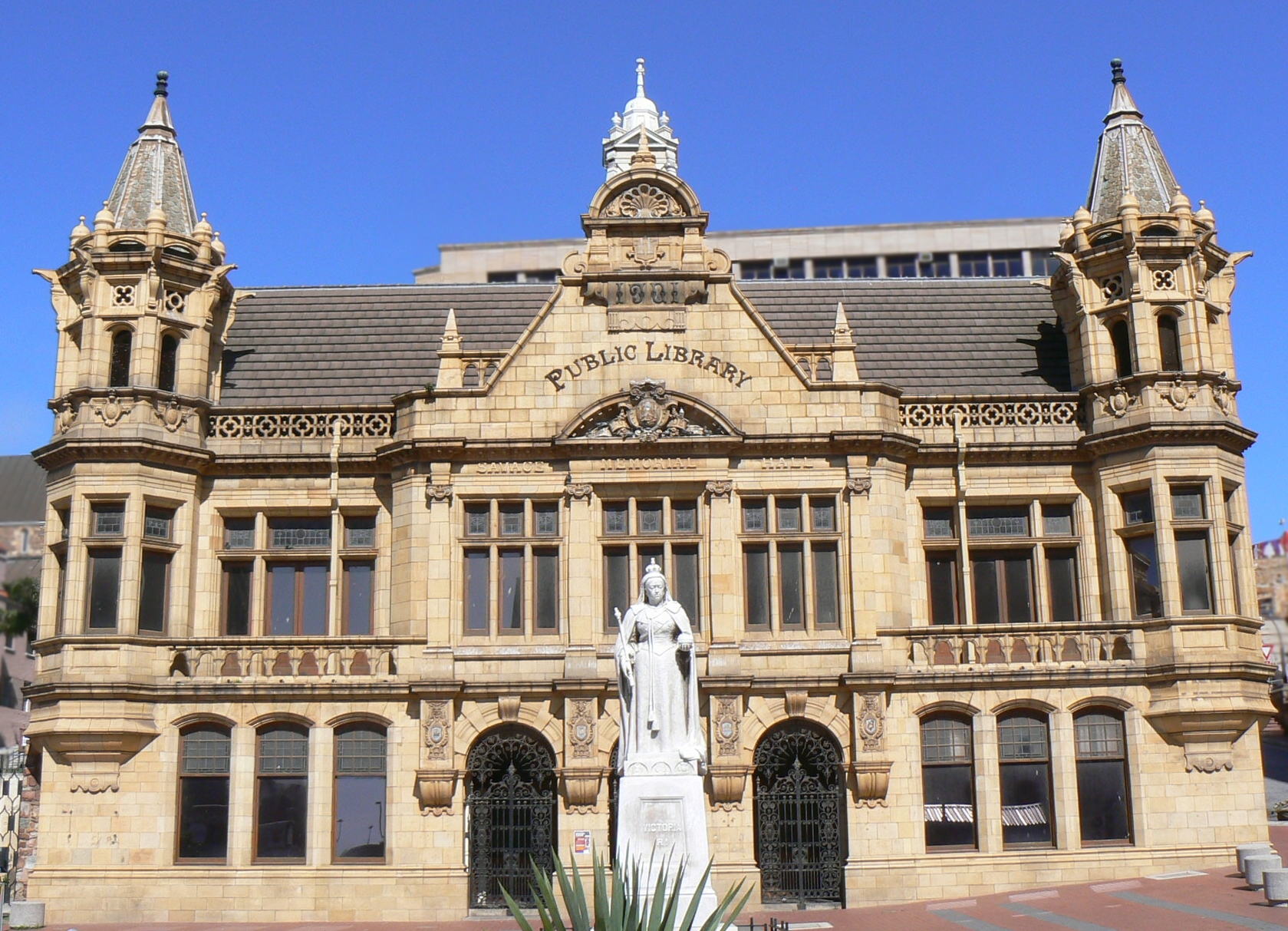
- Port Elizabeth Main Library in 2012
- Click on the map for a fullscreen view

General information
- Location: Port Elizabeth, South Africa
- Coordinates: 33°57′43.26″S 25°37′21.87″E

Port Elizabeth Main Library is a historic building located in Port Elizabeth, South Africa.

== History ==
The origins of the library date back to 1844, when a small reading society called the Port Elizabeth News Society was founded, initially housed in a rented room above a shop in Jetty Street. In 1845, the society moved into the building known as the Commercial Hall, located on the site where the present library now stands. In 1848, a public assembly led to the establishment of a subscription library, funded by public donations, guaranteed annual income, and a state contribution. With these resources, the society acquired ownership of the Commercial Hall. In 1854, the building was leased to the government and converted into a courthouse. Meanwhile, the library moved to several different locations before returning in 31 July 1902, when the current building was officially inaugurated on the site of the old Commercial Hall.

In the 1960s, plans were made to demolish the building to make way for a new administrative block, but the project was never carried out and, in 1983, the library was declared a historical monument.

== Description ==
The building is located at the north-western corner of Market Square in the centre of Port Elizabeth.

The structure is regarded as an excellent example of Victorian Gothic Revival architecture, with a terracotta façade produced in England. In front of the library stands a Sicilian marble statue of Queen Victoria, unveiled in 1903, which dominates the surrounding square.

== Gallery ==
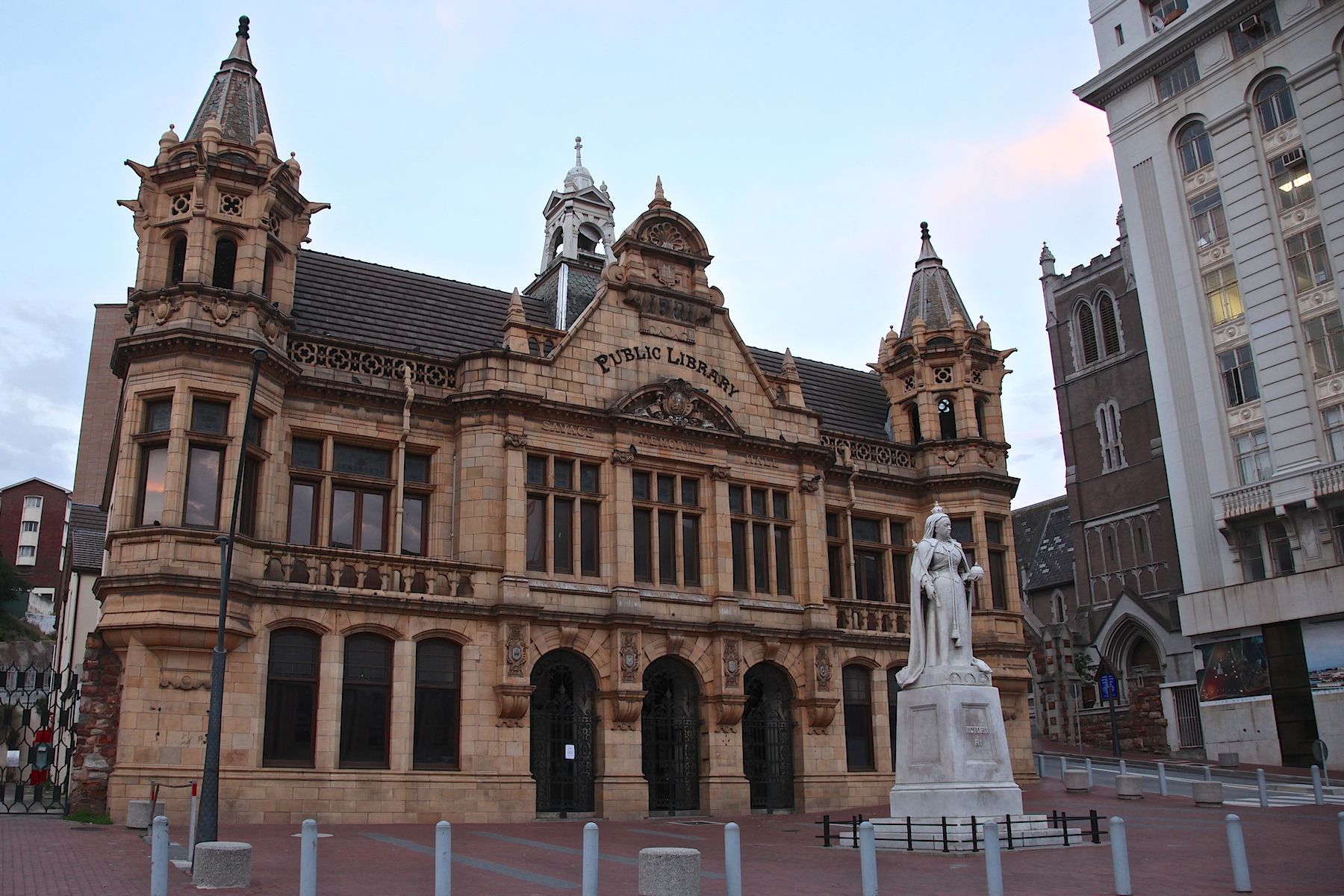

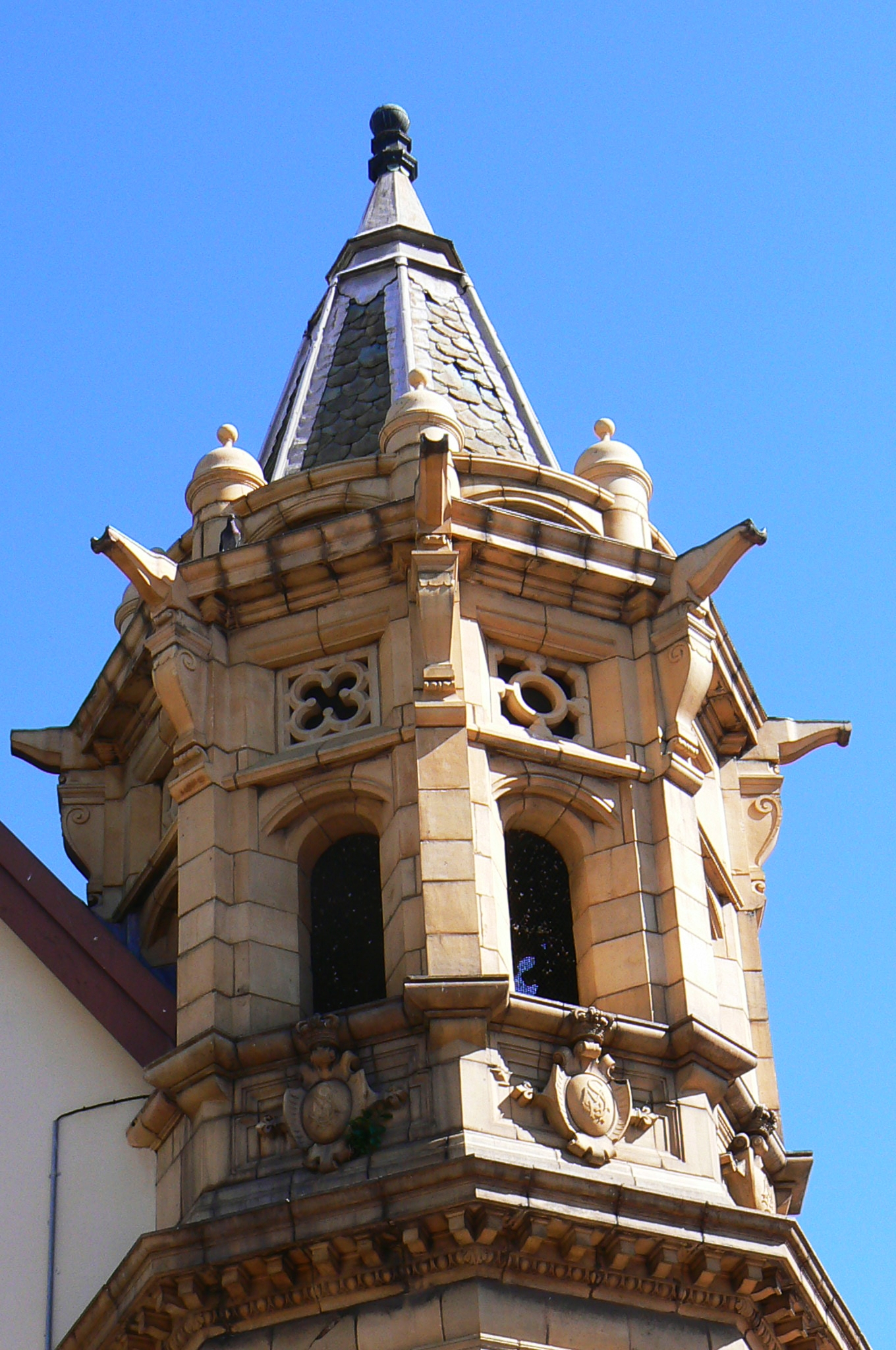

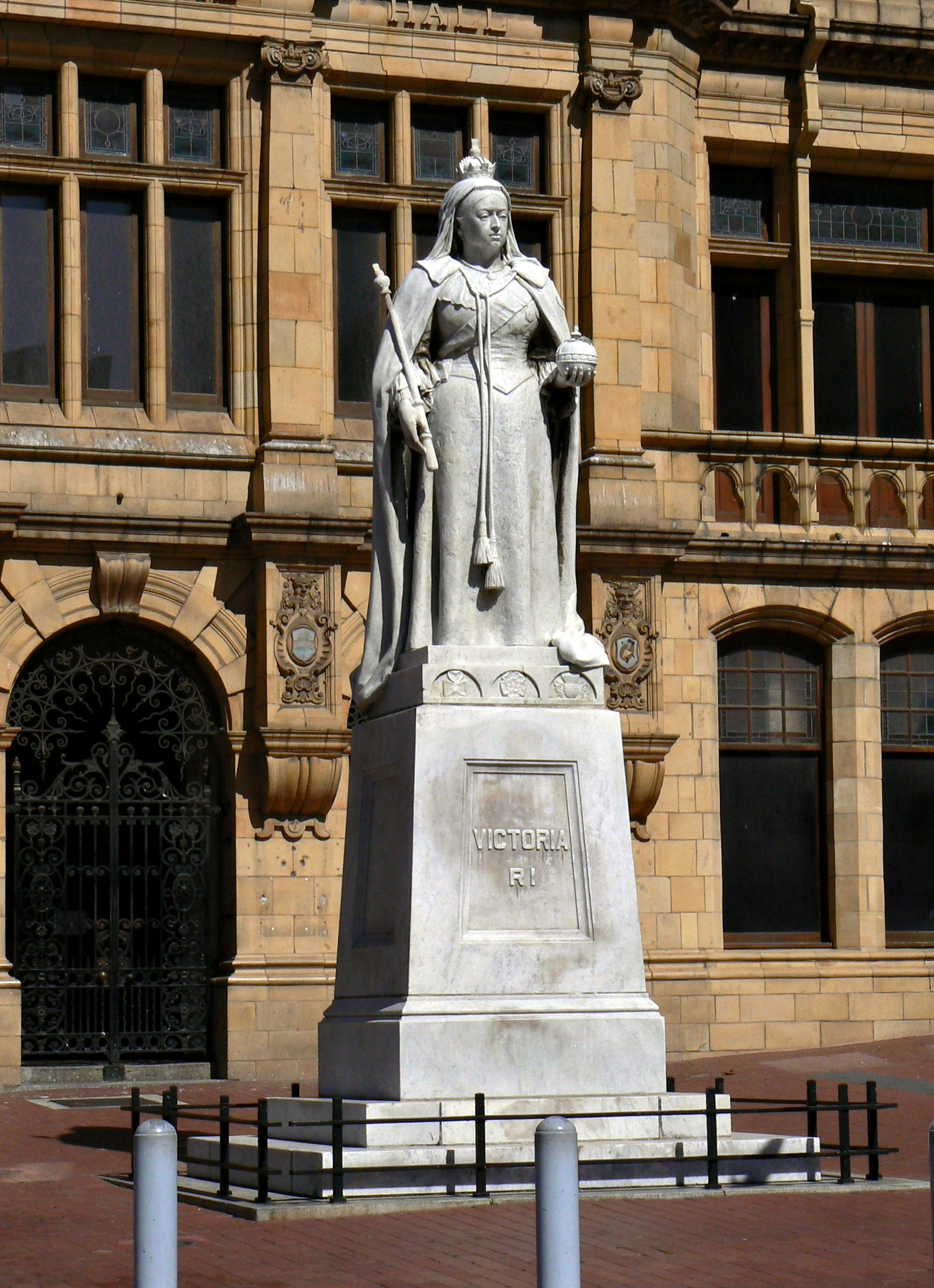

== See also ==
- List of heritage sites in Port Elizabeth
