= Port Elizabeth City Hall =

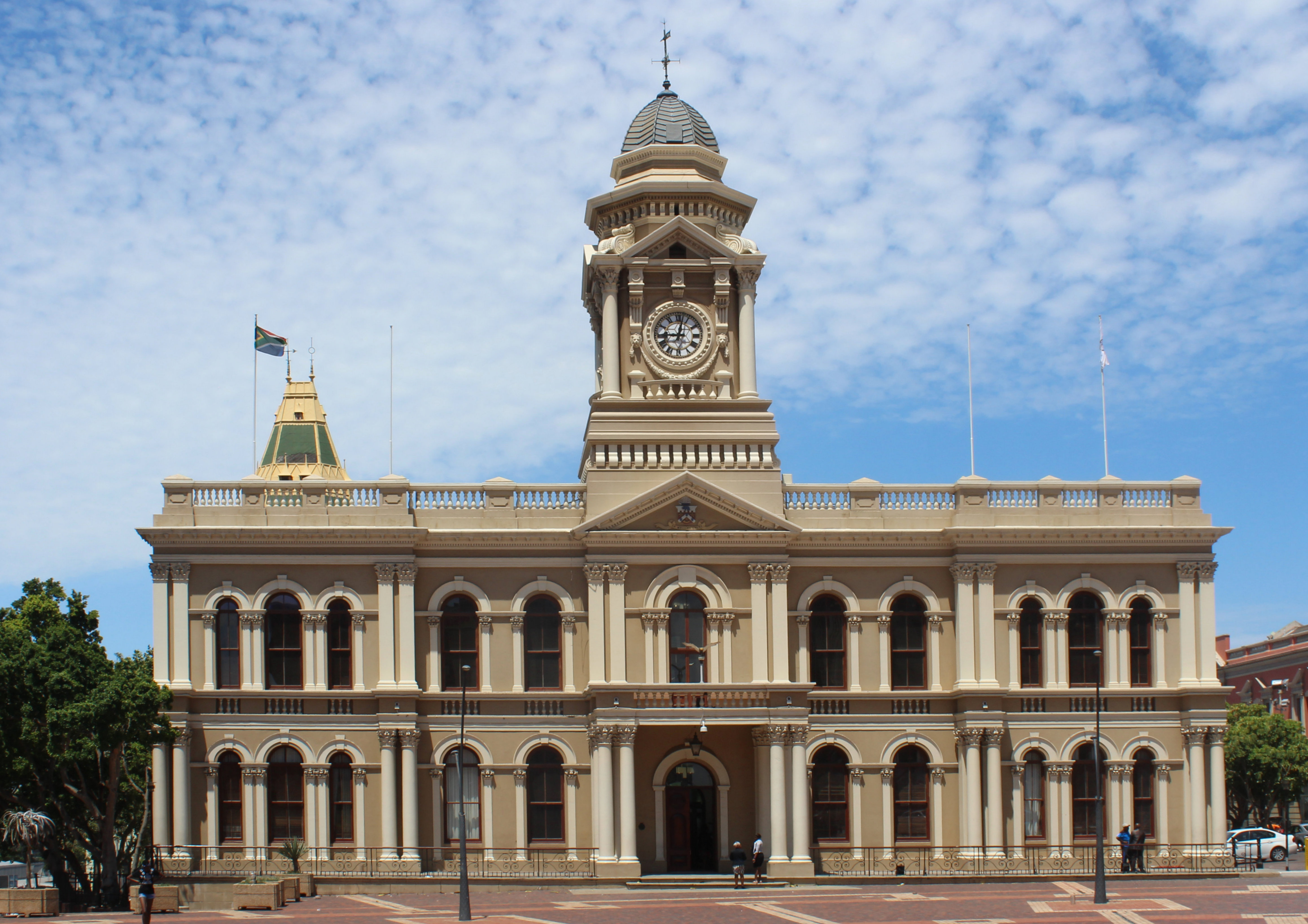
- Port Elizabeth City Hall in 2016
- Click on the map for a fullscreen view

General information
- Location: Gqeberha, South Africa
- Coordinates: 33°57′44.83″S 25°37′25.22″E

Port Elizabeth City Hall is a historic city hall located in Port Elizabeth (Gqeberha) in the Eastern Cape, South Africa.

== History ==
The building was erected around 1862 by the design of architect Robert Archibald. The clock tower was added in 1883.

The building was declared a national monument on 7 December 1973.

== Description ==
The building, which extends over two levels, features an Italianate style. The symmetrical main façade is characterized by plaster cladding and decorative stucco.

== Gallery ==
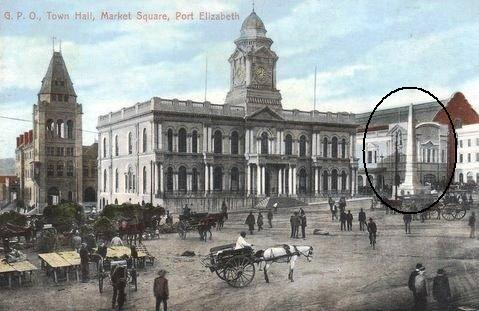

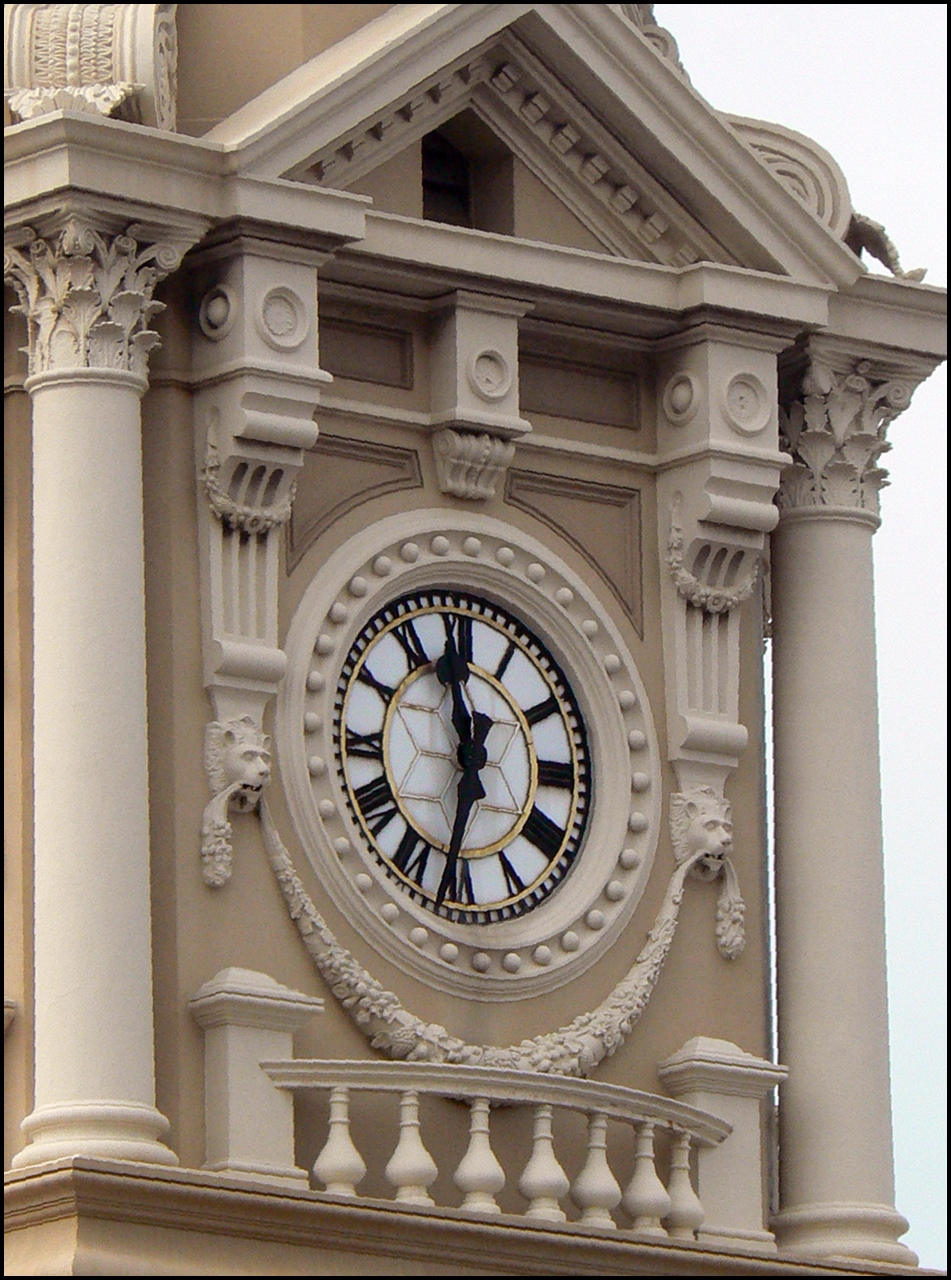

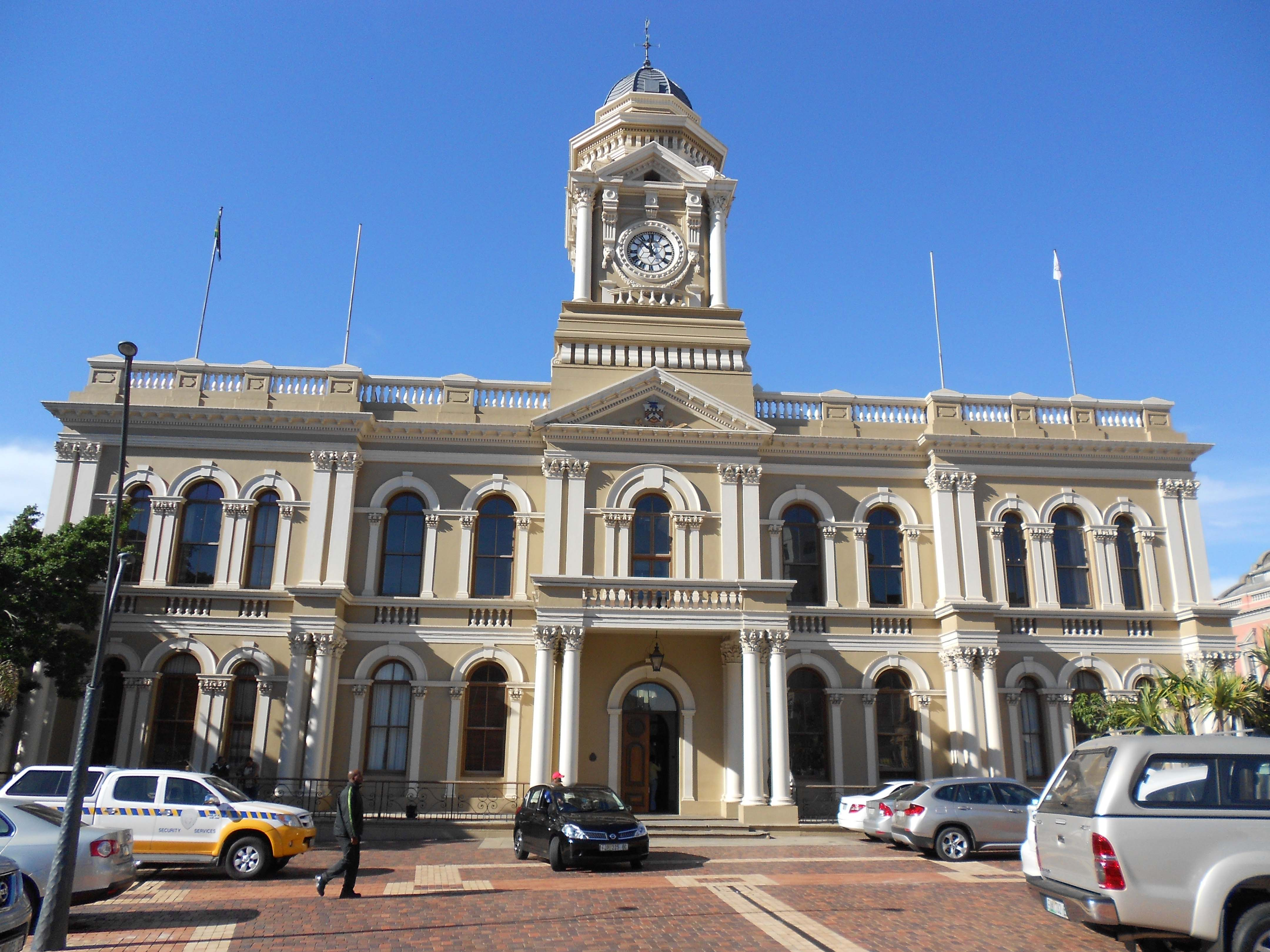

== See also ==
- List of heritage sites in Port Elizabeth
